= List of villages in Ludhiana West tehsil =

Villages in Ludhiana West tehsil
- Tehsil
- Location in Punjab, India Villages in Ludhiana West tehsil (India)
- Coordinates: 30.900965°N 75.8572758°E
- Country: India
- State: Punjab
- District: Ludhiana

Languages
  - Official: Punjabi
  - Other spoken: Hindi
- Time zone: UTC+5:30 (IST)
- Telephone code: 0161
- ISO 3166 code: IN-PB
- Vehicle registration: PB-10
- Website: ludhiana.nic.in

Ludhiana West tehsil has 125 villages and is in the Ludhiana district, Punjab, India.

== A ==
- Akalgarh Urf Lalton Khurd
- Alamgir (Ludhiana West)
- Allowal (Ludhiana West)
- Assi Khurd
- Ayali Kalan
- Ayali Khurd

== B ==
- Bagga Kalan
- Bagga Khurd
- Bahadarke
- Bains (Ludhiana West)
- Balloke
- Ballowal
- Baraich
- Baran Hara
- Barewal Dogran
- Basaimi
- Beela
- Bhanohar
- Bhattian (Ludhiana West)
- Bholewal Jadid
- Bholewal Qadim
- Birmi
- Bounker Dogran
- Brahman Majra
- Bulara
- Burj Lambra
- Burj Man Kaur

== C ==
- Chak Kalan (Ludhiana West)
- Chaminda (Ludhiana West)
- Changan (Ludhiana West)
- Chark
- Chhapar (Ludhiana West)
- Chhokar (Ludhiana West)
- Chuharpura

== D ==
- Dad (Ludhiana West)
- Dakha (Ludhiana West)
- Dangora
- Dewatwal
- Dhaipai
- Dhandra
- Dhat (Ludhiana West)
- Dhurkot (Ludhiana West)
- Doleh (Ludhiana West)
- Dolon Kalan
- Dolon Khurd
- Dugri

== F ==
- Fatehgarh Gujjran

== G ==
- Garha (Ludhiana West)
- Gaunspur (Ludhiana West)
- Ghungrana
- Gill
- Goindwal (Ludhiana West)
- Gorsian Hakamrai
- Gujjarwal (Ludhiana West)

== H ==
- Hambran
- Harnampura
- Hassanpur (Ludhiana West)
- Himayunpura
- Hussainpura

== I ==
- Isewal

== J ==
- Jainpur
- Jangpur
- Jarahan
- Jaspal Bangar
- Jassian
- Jhamat
- Jhameri
- Jhanda (Ludhiana West)

== K ==
- Kadian (Ludhiana West)
- Kailpur
- Kaind
- Karimpur (Ludhiana West)
- Khaira
- Khaira Bet
- Khandur
- Khanjarwal
- Khanpur (Ludhiana West)
- Khark (Ludhiana West)
- Kheri (Ludhiana West)

== L ==
- Ladian Kalan
- Ladian Khurd
- Lalton Kalan
- Latala (Ludhiana West)
- Laudhowal
- Lohgarh (Ludhiana West)

== M ==
- Mahmudpura
- Majara Kalan
- Majra Khurd
- Malakpur
- Manakwal
- Mandiani
- Manj (Ludhiana West)
- Mannewal
- Mansuran (Ludhiana West)
- Mehtabgarh
- Mohi (Ludhiana West)
- Mor Karima
- Mullanpur (Ludhiana West)

Back to top

== N ==
- Narangwal
- Nurpur Bet

== P ==
- Pamal
- Pamali
- Pandori (Ludhiana West)
- Phagguwal
- Phagla
- Phallewal
- Phullanwal

== Q ==
- Qutabewal Araian
- Qutbewal Gujjran

== R ==
- Rajapur (Ludhiana West)
- Rajjowal
- Rajpura Urf Hussainpura
- Ranguwala
- Ranian
- Raqba
- Rattan (Ludhiana West)
- Rurka (Ludhiana West)

== S ==
- Sahuli
- Salempur (Ludhiana West)
- Sangowal (Ludhiana West)
- Saraba
- Sarih (Ludhiana West)
- Shehzad (Ludhiana West)

== T ==
- Talwandi Kalan (Ludhiana West)
- Talwandi Khurd
- Talwara (Ludhiana West)
- Thakarwal
