= Gahaur =

Gahour
- Village
- Gahour
- Location in Punjab, India Gahour (India)
- Coordinates: 30.869216°N 75.7155954°E
- Country: India
- State: Punjab
- District: Ludhiana
- Tehsil: Ludhiana West

Government
  - Type: Panchayati raj (India)
  - Body: Gram panchayat

Languages
  - Official: Punjabi
  - Other spoken: Hindi
- Time zone: UTC+5:30 (IST)
- Postal code: 141102
- Telephone code: 0161
- ISO 3166 code: IN-PB
- Vehicle registration: PB-10
- Website: ludhiana.nic.in

Gahour is a village located in the Ludhiana West tehsil, of Ludhiana district, Punjab.

== Demographics- ==
As of 2011, Gahour has a total of 318 households. Out of the population 168 people are under 6 years old; of those 93 are male and 75 female.

Census 2011: Demographics
Particulars	Total	Male	Female
Population	1566	817	749
Literates	1160	637	523
