= Hambran =

- Village
- Hambran
- Location in Punjab, India Hambran (India)
- Coordinates: 30.9349882°N 75.6544408°E
- Country: India
- State: Punjab
- District: Ludhiana
- Tehsil: Ludhiana West

Government
  - Type: Panchayati raj (India)
  - Body: Gram panchayat

Languages
  - Mosty spoken: Punjabi
  - Other spoken: Hindi
- Time zone: UTC+5:30 (IST)
- Telephone code: 0161
- ISO 3166 code: IN-PB
- Vehicle registration: PB-10
- Pin Code: 141110

Hambran is a village located in the Ludhiana West tehsil, of Ludhiana district, Punjab.

Hambran is a township in Punjab state in India. Located in the Ludhiana District close to Mullanpur Dakha, 17 Km ( 10 miles ) west of Ludhiana.

In 2019 Panchayat Polling that the S.Ranjodh Singh alias jagga is elected as sarpanch of Hambran.

== Administration ==
The village is administrated by a Sarpanch Ranjodh Singh Jagga who is an elected representative of village as per constitution of India and Panchayati raj (India).

Particulars	Total	Male	Female
Total No. of Houses	739		
Population	3,493	1,851	1,642

== Air travel connectivity ==
The closest airport to the village is Sahnewal Airport.
