= Shehzad (Ludhiana West) =

Shehzad Sehzad
- Village
- Location in Punjab, India Shehzad (India)
- Coordinates: 30.8152131°N 75.7615252°E
- Country: India
- State: Punjab
- District: Ludhiana
- Tehsil: Ludhiana West

Government
  - Type: Panchayati raj (India)
  - Body: Gram panchayat

Languages
  - Official: Punjabi
  - Other spoken: Hindi, English
- Time zone: UTC+5:30 (IST)
- Telephone code: 0161
- ISO 3166 code: IN-PB
- Vehicle registration: PB-10
- Website: ludhiana.nic.in

Shehzad is a village located in the Ludhiana West tehsil, of Ludhiana district, Punjab.

== Administration ==
The village is administrated by a Sarpanch Mandeep Singh who is an elected representative of village as per constitution of India and Panchayati raj (India).

Particulars	Total	Male	Female
Total No. of Houses	240		
Population	1180	620	560

== Air travel connectivity ==
The closest airport to the village is Sahnewal Airport.
