= Baraich =

- Village
- Location in Punjab, India Baraich (India)
- Coordinates: 30.8725231°N 75.6424553°E
- Country: India
- State: Punjab
- District: Ludhiana
- Tehsil: Ludhiana West

Government
  - Type: Panchayati raj (India)
  - Body: Gram panchayat

Languages
  - Official: Punjabi
  - Other spoken: Hindi
- Time zone: UTC+5:30 (IST)
- Telephone code: 0161
- ISO 3166 code: IN-PB
- Vehicle registration: PB-10
- Website: ludhiana.nic.in

Baraich is a village located in the Ludhiana West tehsil, of Ludhiana district, Punjab.

== Administration ==
The village is administrated by a Sarpanch who is an elected representative of village as per constitution of India and Panchayati raj (India).

Particulars	Total	Male	Female
Total No. of Houses	192		
Population	985	508	477
Child (0–6)	103	53	50
Schedule Caste	174	90	84
Schedule Tribe	0	0	0
Literacy	84.81 %	88.57%	80.80 %
Total Workers	349	288	61
Main Worker	237	0	0
Marginal Worker	112	71	41

== Cast ==
The village constitutes 17.66% of Schedule Caste and the village doesn't have any Schedule Tribe population.

== Air travel connectivity ==
The closest airport to the village is Sahnewal Airport.
