= Chak Kalan (Ludhiana West) =

Village in Punjab, India

- Village
- Location in Punjab, India Chak Kalan (India)
- Coordinates: 30.8976675°N 75.6474994°E
- Country: India
- State: Punjab
- District: Ludhiana
- Tehsil: Ludhiana West

Government
  - Type: Panchayati raj (India)
  - Body: Gram panchayat

Languages
  - Official: Punjabi
  - Other spoken: Hindi
- Time zone: UTC+5:30 (IST)
- Telephone code: 0161
- ISO 3166 code: IN-PB
- Vehicle registration: PB-10
- Website: ludhiana.nic.in

Chak Kalan is a village located in the Ludhiana West tehsil, of Ludhiana district, Punjab.

== Administration ==
The village is administrated by a Sarpanch who is an elected representative of village as per constitution of India and Panchayati raj (India).

Particulars	Total	Male	Female
Total No. of Houses	428		
Population	2,064	1,094	970
Child (0-6)	206	111	95
Schedule Caste	823	433	390
Schedule Tribe	0	0	0
Literacy	78.90 %	83.52 %	73.71 %
Total Workers	639	531	108
Main Worker	510	0	0
Marginal Worker	129	99	30

== Air travel connectivity ==
The closest airport to the village is Sahnewal Airport. Closest International Airport is Sri Guru Ram Das Jee International Airport, Amritsar.
