= Dhat (Ludhiana West) =

- Village
- Location in Punjab, India Dhat (India)
- Coordinates: 30.8215857°N 75.6410382°E
- Country: India
- State: Punjab
- District: Ludhiana
- Tehsil: Ludhiana West

Government
  - Type: Panchayati raj (India)
  - Body: Gram panchayat

Languages
  - Official: Punjabi
  - Other spoken: Hindi
- Time zone: UTC+5:30 (IST)
- Telephone code: 0161
- ISO 3166 code: IN-PB
- Vehicle registration: PB-10
- Website: ludhiana.nic.in

Dhat is a village located in the Ludhiana West tehsil, of Ludhiana district, Punjab.

== Administration ==
The village is administrated by a Sarpanch who is an elected representative of village as per constitution of India and Panchayati raj (India).

Particulars	Total	Male	Female
Total No. of Houses	377		
Population	2,039	1,061	978
Child (0-6)	184	95	89
Schedule Caste	856	443	413
Schedule Tribe	0	0	0
Literacy	79.51 %	83.23 %	75.48 %
Total Workers	655	574	81
Main Worker	597	0	0
Marginal Worker	58	46	12

== Air travel connectivity ==
The closest airport to the village is Sahnewal Airport.
