= Beela =

Bilha
- Village
- Location in Punjab, India Bilha (India)
- Coordinates: 30.9196174°N 75.710231°E
- Country: India
- State: Punjab
- District: Ludhiana
- Tehsil: Ludhiana West

Government
  - Type: Panchayati raj (India)
  - Body: Gram panchayat

Languages
  - Official: Punjabi
  - Other spoken: Hindi
- Time zone: UTC+5:30 (IST)
- Telephone code: 0161
- ISO 3166 code: IN-PB
- Vehicle registration: PB-10
- Website: ludhiana.nic.in

Bihla is a village located in the Ludhiana West tehsil, of Ludhiana district, Punjab, India. It is said to be established by two brothers named Bihla Singh and Poola Singh. The village is divided into two "patees" named after them respectively.

== Gurudwara ==
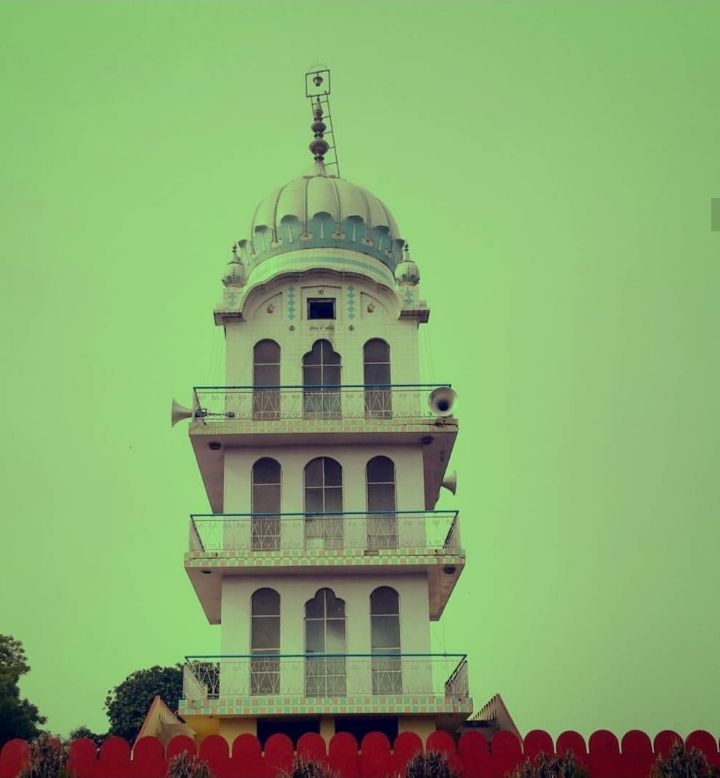
The Bihla Gurudwara 2018

== Administration ==
The village is administrated by a Sarpanch who is an elected representative of village as per constitution of India and Panchayati raj (India). As per stats 2019, Bilha villages fall under Gill assembly & Ludhiana parliamentary constituency. Police Station Sadar, Ludhiana has jurisdiction of the village

Particulars	Total	Male	Female
Total Area	372 hectares		
Total No. of Houses	311		
Population	1,742	912	830
Child (0–6)	97	108	101
Schedule Caste	750	403	347
Schedule Tribe	0	0	0
Literacy	82.51 %	87.61 %	76.82 %
Total Workers	580	533	47
Main Worker	546	0	0
Marginal Worker	34	28	06

== Cast ==
The village constitutes 43.05% of Schedule Caste and the village doesn't have any Schedule Tribe population. Whereas remaining village is dominated by the Grewal cast of Jatt Sikh

== Air travel connectivity ==
The closest airport to the village is Sahnewal Airport.
