= Pamali =

- Village
- Location in Punjab, India Pamali (India)
- Coordinates: 30.8254586°N 75.7442193°E
- Country: India
- State: Punjab
- District: Ludhiana
- Tehsil: Ludhiana West

Government
  - Type: Panchayati raj (India)
  - Body: Gram panchayat

Languages
  - Official: Punjabi
  - Other spoken: Hindi
- Time zone: UTC+5:30 (IST)
- Telephone code: 0161
- ISO 3166 code: IN-PB
- Vehicle registration: PB-10
- Website: ludhiana.nic.in

Pamali is a village located in the Ludhiana West tehsil of Ludhiana district, Punjab.

== Administration ==
The village is administrated by a Sarpanch. Sukhwinder Singh Gollu was elected in 2018 and is an elected representative of village as per constitution of India and Panchayati raj.

Particulars	Total	Male	Female
Total No. of Houses	368		
Population	1,758	932	826

== Transport ==
The closest airport to the village is Sahnewal Airport.
