= Ayali Kalan =

- Village
- Location in Punjab, India Ayali Kalan (India)
- Coordinates: 30.8921988°N 75.754391°E
- Country: India
- State: Punjab
- District: Ludhiana
- Tehsil: Ludhiana West

Government
  - Type: Panchayati raj (India)
  - Body: Gram panchayat

Languages
  - Official: Punjabi
  - Other spoken: Hindi
- Time zone: UTC+5:30 (IST)
- Telephone code: 0161
- ISO 3166 code: IN-PB
- Vehicle registration: PB-10
- Website: ludhiana.nic.in

Ayali Kalan is a village located in the Ludhiana West tehsil, of Ludhiana district, Punjab.

== Administration ==
The village is administrated by a Sarpanch who is an elected representative of village as per constitution of India and Panchayati raj (India).

Particulars	Total	Male	Female
Total No. of Houses	776		
Population	4,054	2,111	1,943
Child (0–6)	525	274	251
Schedule Caste	1,494	783	711
Schedule Tribe	0	0	0
Literacy	76.42%	82.04%	70.33%
Total Workers	1,528	1,166	362
Main Worker	1,348	0	0
Marginal Worker	180	124	56

== Cast ==
The village constitutes 36.85% of Schedule Caste and the village doesn't have any Schedule Tribe population.

== Air travel connectivity ==
The closest airport to the village is Sahnewal Airport.
