= Mansuran (Ludhiana West) =

- Village
- Location in Punjab, India Mansuran (India)
- Coordinates: 30.8066374°N 75.7531249°E
- Country: India
- State: Punjab
- District: Ludhiana
- Tehsil: Ludhiana West

Government
  - Type: Panchayati raj (India)
  - Body: Gram panchayat

Languages
  - Official: Punjabi
  - Other spoken: Hindi
- Time zone: UTC+5:30 (IST)
- Telephone code: 0161
- ISO 3166 code: IN-PB
- Vehicle registration: PB-10
- Website: ludhiana.nic.in

Mansuran is a village located in West Ludhiana in Ludhiana district, Punjab.

== Administration ==
The village is administrated by a Sarpanch who is an elected representative of village as per the Constitution of India and the Panchayati Raj (India).

Particulars	Total	Male	Female
Total No. of Houses	679		
Population	3,564	1,840	1,724

Mansuran Village is 14 kilometers from Ludhiana bus stand and railway station. Mansuran Village also has banking services by Oriental Bank (now PNB), HDFC Bank, and the SBI.

== Air travel connectivity ==
The closest airport to the village is Sahnewal Airport.
