= Khandur =

- Village
- Location in Punjab, India Khandur (India)
- Coordinates: 30.8077°N 75.6756°E
- Country: India
- State: Punjab
- District: Ludhiana
- Tehsil: Ludhiana West

Government
  - Type: Panchayati raj (India)
  - Body: Gram panchayat

Languages
  - Official: Punjabi
  - Other spoken: Hindi
- Time zone: UTC+5:30 (IST)
- Telephone code: 0161
- ISO 3166 code: IN-PB
- Vehicle registration: PB-10
- Website: ludhiana.nic.in

Khandur is a village located in the Ludhiana West tehsil, of Ludhiana district, Punjab.

== Administration ==
The village is administrated by a Sarpanch who is an elected representative of village as per constitution of India and Panchayati raj (India). Sardar Roop Singh Deol has served as sarpanch for 10 years in the past. Bachitar Singh, Mintu Sarpanch are some other sarpanchs of the past. Current Sarpanch of the village is S. Jasvir Singh Deol

Particulars	Total	Male	Female
Total No. of Houses	601		
Population	3,033	1,614	1,419

== Air travel connectivity ==
The closest airport to the village is Sahnewal Airport.
