= Basaimi =

Bassaimi
- Village
- Location in Punjab, India Bassaimi (India)
- Coordinates: 30.9196174°N 75.710231°E
- Country: India
- State: Punjab
- District: Ludhiana
- Tehsil: Ludhiana West

Government
  - Type: Panchayati raj (India)
  - Body: Gram panchayat

Languages
  - Official: Punjabi
  - Other spoken: Hindi
- Time zone: UTC+5:30 (IST)
- Telephone code: 0161
- ISO 3166 code: IN-PB
- Vehicle registration: PB-10
- Website: ludhiana.nic.in

Basaimi is a village located in the Ludhiana West tehsil, of Ludhiana district, Punjab.

== Administration ==
The village is administrated by a Sarpanch who is an elected representative of village as per constitution of India and Panchayati raj (India).

Particulars	Total	Male	Female
Total No. of Houses	132		
Population	603	318	285
Child (0–6)	102	48	54
Schedule Caste	156	84	72
Schedule Tribe	0	0	0
Literacy	67.66 %	73.70 %	60.61 %
Total Workers	283	198	85
Main Worker	251	0	0
Marginal Worker	32	13	19

== Cast ==
The village constitutes 25.87% of Schedule Caste and the village doesn't have any Schedule Tribe population.

== Air travel connectivity ==
The closest airport to the village is Sahnewal Airport.
