= Baran Hara =

- Village
- Location in Punjab, India Baran Hara (India)
- Coordinates: 30.9321431°N 75.7650302°E
- Country: India
- State: Punjab
- District: Ludhiana
- Tehsil: Ludhiana West

Government
  - Type: Panchayati raj (India)
  - Body: Gram panchayat

Languages
  - Official: Punjabi
  - Other spoken: Hindi
- Time zone: UTC+5:30 (IST)
- Telephone code: 0161
- ISO 3166 code: IN-PB
- Vehicle registration: PB-10
- Website: ludhiana.nic.in

Baran Hara is a village that is located in the Ludhiana West tehsil, of Ludhiana district, Punjab.

== Administration ==
The village is administrated by a Sarpanch, who is an elected representative of the village as per the constitution of India and Panchayati raj (India).

Particulars	Total	Male	Female
Total No. of Houses	297		
Population	1,462	748	714
Child (0–6)	192	108	84
Schedule Caste	686	360	326
Schedule Tribe	0	0	0
Literacy	78.50 %	80.94 %	76.03 %
Total Workers	566	427	139
Main Worker	445	0	0
Marginal Worker	121	38	83

== Cast ==
The village constitutes 46.92% of Schedule Caste and the it doesn't have any Schedule Tribe population.

== Air travel connectivity ==
The closest airport to the village is Sahnewal Airport.
