= Bains, Punjab =

Bains
- Village
- Location in Punjab, India Bains (India)
- Coordinates: 30.8702019°N 75.4467981°E
- Country: India
- State: Punjab
- District: Ludhiana
- Tehsil: Ludhiana West

Government
  - Type: Panchayati raj (India)
  - Body: Gram panchayat

Languages
  - Official: Punjabi
  - Other spoken: Hindi
- Time zone: UTC+5:30 (IST)
- Telephone code: 0161
- ISO 3166 code: IN-PB
- Vehicle registration: PB-10
- Website: ludhiana.nic.in

Bains is a village located in the Ludhiana West tehsil, of Ludhiana district, Punjab.

== Administration ==
The village is administrated by a Sarpanch who is an elected representative of village as per constitution of India and Panchayati raj (India).

Particulars	Total	Male	Female
Total No. of Houses	310		
Population	1,616	835	781
Child (0-6)	198	104	94
Schedule Caste	604	319	285
Schedule Tribe	0	0	0
Literacy	86.60 %	90.42 %	82.53 %
Total Workers	950	475	475
Main Worker	906	0	0
Marginal Worker	44	33	11

== Cast ==
The village constitutes 37.38% of Schedule Caste and the village doesn't have any Schedule Tribe population.

== Air travel connectivity ==
The closest airport to the village is Sahnewal Airport.
