= Chark =

- Village
- Location in Punjab, India Chark (India)
- Coordinates: 30.900965°N 75.8572758°E
- Country: India
- State: Punjab
- District: Ludhiana
- Tehsil: Ludhiana West

Government
  - Type: Panchayati raj (India)
  - Body: Gram panchayat

Languages
  - Official: Punjabi
  - Other spoken: Hindi
- Time zone: UTC+5:30 (IST)
- Telephone code: 0161
- ISO 3166 code: IN-PB
- Vehicle registration: PB-10
- Website: ludhiana.nic.in

Chark is a village located in the Ludhiana West tehsil, of Ludhiana district, Punjab.

== Administration ==
The village is administrated by a Sarpanch who is an elected representative of village as per constitution of India and Panchayati raj (India).

Particulars	Total	Male	Female
Total No. of Houses	240		
Population	1,161	594	567
Child (0-6)	126	59	67
Schedule Caste	499	255	244
Schedule Tribe	0	0	0
Literacy	54.59 %	62.43 %	46.20 %
Total Workers	457	317	140
Main Worker	318	0	0
Marginal Worker	139	107	32

== Air travel connectivity ==
The closest airport to the village is Sahnewal Airport.
