= Fatehgarh Gujjran =

- Village
- Location in Punjab, India Fatehgarh Gujjran (India)
- Coordinates: 30.9536024°N 76.1193806°E
- Country: India
- State: Punjab
- District: Ludhiana
- Tehsil: Ludhiana West

Government
  - Type: Panchayati raj (India)
  - Body: Gram panchayat

Languages
  - Official: Punjabi
  - Other spoken: Hindi
- Time zone: UTC+5:30 (IST)
- Telephone code: 0161
- ISO 3166 code: IN-PB
- Vehicle registration: PB-10
- Website: ludhiana.nic.in

Fatehgarh Gujjran is a village located in the Ludhiana West tehsil, of Ludhiana district, Punjab.

== Administration ==
The village is administrated by a Sarpanch who is an elected representative of village as per constitution of India and Panchayati raj (India).

Particulars	Total	Male	Female
Total No. of Houses	161		
Population	732	391	341

== Child Sex Ratio details ==
The village population of children with an age group from 0-6 is 95 which makes up 12.98% of total population of village. Average Sex Ratio is 872 per 1000 males which is lower than the state average of 895. The child Sex Ratio as per census is 827, lower than average of 846 in the state of Punjab.

== Air travel connectivity ==
The closest airport to the village is Sahnewal Airport.
