= Khark (Ludhiana West) =

- Village
- Location in Punjab, India Khark (India)
- Coordinates: 30.9704292°N 75.7154318°E
- Country: India
- State: Punjab
- District: Ludhiana
- Tehsil: Ludhiana West

Government
  - Type: Panchayati raj (India)
  - Body: Gram panchayat

Languages
  - Official: Punjabi
  - Other spoken: Hindi
- Time zone: UTC+5:30 (IST)
- Telephone code: 0161
- ISO 3166 code: IN-PB
- Vehicle registration: PB-10
- Website: ludhiana.nic.in

Khark is a village located in the Ludhiana West tehsil, of Ludhiana district, Punjab.

== Administration ==
The village is administered by a sarpanch who is an elected representative of village as per the constitution of India and Panchayati raj (India).

Particulars	Total	Male	Female
Total no. of houses	28		
Population	144	73	71

== Air travel connectivity ==
The closest airport to the village is Sahnewal Airport.
