= Burj Man Kaur =

- Village
- Location in Punjab, India Burj Man Kaur (India)
- Coordinates: 30.9595989°N 75.6974744°E
- Country: India
- State: Punjab
- District: Ludhiana
- Tehsil: Ludhiana West

Government
  - Type: Panchayati raj (India)
  - Body: Gram panchayat

Languages
  - Official: Punjabi
- Time zone: UTC+5:30 (IST)
- Telephone code: 0161
- ISO 3166 code: IN-PB
- Vehicle registration: PB-91
- Website: ludhiana.nic.in

Burj Man Kaur is a village located in the Ludhiana West tehsil, of Ludhiana district, Punjab, India.

== Administration ==
The village is administrated by a Sarpanch who is an elected representative of village as per constitution of India and Panchayati raj (India).

Particulars	Total	Male	Female
Total No. of Houses	43		
Population	193	94	99
Child (0–6)	28	14	14
Schedule Caste	84	42	42
Schedule Tribe	0	0	0
Literacy	73.94 %	81.25 %	67.06 %
Total Workers	57	54	03
Main Worker	52	0	0
Marginal Worker	05	03	02

== Air travel connectivity ==
The closest airport to the village is Sahnewal Airport.
