= Dad (Ludhiana West) =

- Village
- Location in Punjab, India Dad (India)
- Coordinates: 30.8651557°N 75.7759053°E
- Country: India
- State: Punjab
- District: Ludhiana
- Tehsil: Ludhiana West

Government
  - Type: Panchayati raj (India)
  - Body: Gram panchayat

Languages
  - Official: Punjabi
  - Other spoken: Hindi
- Time zone: UTC+5:30 (IST)
- Telephone code: 0161
- ISO 3166 code: IN-PB
- Vehicle registration: PB-10
- Website: ludhiana.nic.in

Dad is a village located in the Ludhiana West tehsil, of Ludhiana district, Punjab.

== Administration ==
The village is administrated by a Sarpanch who is an elected representative of village as per constitution of India and Panchayati raj (India).

Particulars	Total	Male	Female
Total No. of Houses	2,037		
Population	9,932	5,207	4,725
Child (0-6)	1,116	588	528
Schedule Caste	2,659	1,395	1,264
Schedule Tribe	0	0	0
Literacy	83.93 %	87.59 %	79.89 %
Total Workers	3,655	2,818	837
Main Worker	3,310	0	0
Marginal Worker	345	151	194

== Air travel connectivity ==
The closest airport to the village is Sahnewal Airport.
