= Dhandra =

- Village
- Location in Punjab, India Dhandra (India)
- Coordinates: 30.8526203°N 75.8358205°E
- Country: India
- State: Punjab
- District: Ludhiana
- Tehsil: Ludhiana West

Government
  - Type: Panchayati raj (India)
  - Body: Gram panchayat

Languages
  - Official: Punjabi
  - Other spoken: Hindi
- Time zone: UTC+5:30 (IST)
- Telephone code: 0161
- ISO 3166 code: IN-PB
- Vehicle registration: PB-10
- Website: ludhiana.nic.in

Dhandra is a village located in the Ludhiana West tehsil, of Ludhiana district, Punjab.

== Administration ==
The village is administrated by a Sarpanch who is an elected representative of village as per constitution of India and Panchayati raj (India).

Particulars	Total	Male	Female
Total No. of Houses	3,050		
Population	14,972	7,827	7,145
Child (0-6)	1,756	943	813
Schedule Caste	2,528	1,309	1,219
Schedule Tribe	0	0	0
Literacy	85.06 %	88.86 %	80.92 %
Total Workers	5,409	4,334	1,075
Main Worker	4,842	0	0
Marginal Worker	567	292	275

== Air travel connectivity ==
The closest airport to the village is Sahnewal Airport.
