= Barewal Dogran =

- Village
- Location in Punjab, India Barewal Dogran (India)
- Coordinates: 30.9644979°N 75.7854295°E
- Country: India
- State: Punjab
- District: Ludhiana
- Tehsil: Ludhiana West

Government
  - Type: Panchayati raj (India)
  - Body: Gram panchayat

Languages
  - Official: Punjabi
  - Other spoken: Hindi
- Time zone: UTC+5:30 (IST)
- Telephone code: 0161
- ISO 3166 code: IN-PB
- Vehicle registration: PB-10
- Website: ludhiana.nic.in

Barewal Dogran is a village located in the Ludhiana West tehsil, of Ludhiana district, Punjab.

== Administration ==
The village is administrated by a Sarpanch who is an elected representative of village as per constitution of India and Panchayati raj (India).

Particulars	Total	Male	Female
Total No. of Houses	63		
Population	340	189	151
Child (0–6)	34	17	17
Schedule Caste	172	94	78
Schedule Tribe	0	0	0
Literacy	78.84 %	76.16 %	73.13 %
Total Workers	118	113	5
Main Worker	117	0	0
Marginal Worker	1	1	0

== Cast ==
The village constitutes 50.59% of Schedule Caste and the village doesn't have any Schedule Tribe population.

== Air travel connectivity ==
The closest airport to the village is Sahnewal Airport.
