= Dolon Khurd =

- Village
- Location in Punjab, India Dolon Khurd (India)
- Coordinates: 30.8178897°N 75.7903003°E
- Country: India
- State: Punjab
- District: Ludhiana
- Tehsil: Ludhiana West

Government
  - Type: Panchayati raj (India)
  - Body: Gram panchayat

Languages
  - Official: Punjabi
  - Other spoken: Hindi
- Time zone: UTC+5:30 (IST)
- Telephone code: 0161
- ISO 3166 code: IN-PB
- Vehicle registration: PB-10
- Website: ludhiana.nic.in

Dolon Khurd is a village located in the Ludhiana West tehsil, of Ludhiana district, Punjab.

== Administration ==
The village is administrated by a Sarpanch who is an elected representative of village as per constitution of India and Panchayati raj (India).

Particulars	Total	Male	Female
Total No. of Houses	169		
Population	914	486	428

== Child Sex Ratio details ==
The village population of children with an age group from 0-6 is 88 which makes up 9.63% of total population of village. Average Sex Ratio is 881 per 1000 males which is lower than the state average of 895. The child Sex Ratio as per census is 692, lower than average of 846 in the state of Punjab.

== Air travel connectivity ==
The closest airport to the village is Sahnewal Airport.
