= Birmi =

- Village
- Location in Punjab, India Birmi (India)
- Coordinates: 30.9158345°N 75.7211584°E
- Country: India
- State: Punjab
- District: Ludhiana
- Tehsil: Ludhiana West

Government
  - Type: Panchayati raj (India)
  - Body: Gram panchayat

Languages
  - Official: Punjabi
  - Other spoken: Hindi
- Time zone: UTC+5:30 (IST)
- Telephone code: 0161
- ISO 3166 code: IN-PB
- Vehicle registration: PB-10
- Website: ludhiana.nic.in

Birmi is a village located in the Ludhiana West tehsil, of Ludhiana district, Punjab.

== Administration ==
The village is administrated by a Sarpanch who is an elected representative of village as per constitution of India and Panchayati raj (India).

Particulars	Total	Male	Female
Total No. of Houses	367		
Population	1,952	1,003	949
Child (0–6)	258	131	127
Literacy	76.33%	79.13 %	73.36 %
Total Workers	576	532	44
Main Worker	506	0	0
Marginal Worker	70	61	09

== Air travel connectivity ==
The closest airport to the village is Sahnewal Airport.
