= Changan (Ludhiana West) =

- Village
- Location in Punjab, India Changan (India)
- Coordinates: 30.8971199°N 75.6636572°E
- Country: India
- State: Punjab
- District: Ludhiana
- Tehsil: Ludhiana West

Government
  - Type: Panchayati raj (India)
  - Body: Gram panchayat

Languages
  - Official: Punjabi
  - Other spoken: Hindi
- Time zone: UTC+5:30 (IST)
- Telephone code: 0161
- ISO 3166 code: IN-PB
- Vehicle registration: PB-10
- Website: ludhiana.nic.in

Changan is a village located in the Ludhiana West tehsil, of Ludhiana district, Punjab.

== Administration ==
The village is administrated by a Sarpanch who is an elected representative of village as per constitution of India and Panchayati raj (India).

Particulars	Total	Male	Female
Total No. of Houses	158		
Population	800	413	387
Child (0-6)	79	38	41
Schedule Caste	540	277	263
Schedule Tribe	0	0	0
Literacy	83.77 %	90.40 %	76.59 %
Total Workers	273	234	39
Main Worker	224	0	0
Marginal Worker	49	40	09

Mula pura Dhkha

== Air travel connectivity ==
The closest airport to the village is Sahnewal Airport.
