= Bagga Khurd =

- Village
- Location in Punjab, India Bagga Khurd (India)
- Coordinates: 30.9508972°N 75.7618476°E
- Country: India
- State: Punjab
- District: Ludhiana
- Tehsil: Ludhiana West

Government
  - Type: Panchayati raj (India)
  - Body: Gram panchayat

Languages
  - Official: Punjabi
  - Other spoken: Hindi
- Time zone: UTC+5:30 (IST)
- Telephone code: 0161
- ISO 3166 code: IN-PB
- Vehicle registration: PB-10
- Website: ludhiana.nic.in

Bagga Khurd is a village located in the Ludhiana West tehsil, of Ludhiana district, Punjab.

== Administration ==
The village is administrated by a Sarpanch who is an elected representative of village as per constitution of India and Panchayati raj (India).

Particulars	Total	Male	Female
Total No. of Houses	125		
Population	678	351	2,918
Child (0–6)	80	38	42
Schedule Caste	377	200	177
Schedule Tribe	0	0	0
Literacy	73.24 %	76.68 %	69.47 %
Total Workers	237	206	31
Main Worker	233	0	0
Marginal Worker	4	0	4

== Cast ==
The village constitutes 55.60% of Schedule Caste and the village doesn't have any Schedule Tribe population.

== Air travel connectivity ==
The closest airport to the village is Sahnewal Airport.
