= Dewatwal =

- Village
- Location in Punjab, India Dewatwal (India)
- Coordinates: 30.8917006°N 75.6971453°E
- Country: India
- State: Punjab
- District: Ludhiana
- Tehsil: Ludhiana West

Government
  - Type: Panchayati raj (India)
  - Body: Gram panchayat

Languages
  - Official: Punjabi
  - Other spoken: Hindi
- Time zone: UTC+5:30 (IST)
- Telephone code: 0161
- ISO 3166 code: IN-PB
- Vehicle registration: PB-10
- Website: ludhiana.nic.in

Dewatwal is a village in the Ludhiana West tehsil of Ludhiana district, Punjab India.

== Administration ==
The village is administrated by a Sarpanch who is an elected representative of village as per constitution of India and Panchayati raj (India).

Particulars	Total	Male	Female
Total No. of Houses	440		
Population	2,356	1,225	1,131
Child (0-6)	238	118	120
Schedule Caste	1,607	818	789
Schedule Tribe	0	0	0
Literacy	82.34 %	88.71 %	75.37 %
Total Workers	674	255	
Main Worker	819	0	0
Marginal Worker	110	33	77

== Air travel connectivity ==
The closest airport to the village is Sahnewal Airport.
