= Chaminda (Ludhiana West) =

- Village
- Location in Punjab, India Chaminda (India)
- Coordinates: 30.7664254°N 75.7360768°E
- Country: India
- State: Punjab
- District: Ludhiana
- Tehsil: Ludhiana West

Government
  - Type: Panchayati raj (India)
  - Body: Gram panchayat

Languages
  - Official: Punjabi
  - Other spoken: Hindi
- Time zone: UTC+5:30 (IST)
- Telephone code: 0161
- ISO 3166 code: IN-PB
- Vehicle registration: PB-10
- Website: ludhiana.nic.in

Chaminda is a village located in the Ludhiana West tehsil, of Ludhiana district, Punjab.

== Administration ==
The village is administered by a sarpanch who is an elected representative of village as per constitution of India and Panchayati raj (India).

Particulars	Total	Male	Female
Total no. of houses	437		
Population	2,236	1,178	1,058
Child (0-6)	195	116	79
Schedule Caste	910	472	438
Schedule Tribe	0	0	0
Literacy	86.04 %	90.68 %	81.00 %
Total workers	840	665	175
Main worker	721	0	0
Marginal worker	119	99	20

== Air travel connectivity ==
The closest airport to the village is Sahnewal Airport.
