= Jainpur =

- Village
- Location in Punjab, India Jainpur (India)
- Coordinates: 30.9310856°N 75.7460333°E
- Country: India
- State: Punjab
- District: Ludhiana
- Tehsil: Ludhiana West

Government
  - Type: Panchayati raj (India)
  - Body: Gram panchayat

Languages
  - Official: Punjabi
  - Other spoken: Hindi
- Time zone: UTC+5:30 (IST)
- Telephone code: 0161
- ISO 3166 code: IN-PB
- Vehicle registration: PB-10
- Website: ludhiana.nic.in

Jainpur is a village located in the Ludhiana West tehsil, of Ludhiana district, Punjab.

== Administration ==
The village is administered by a sarpanch, who is an elected representative of the village as per the constitution of India, and a panchayati raj.

Particulars	Total	Male	Female
Total No. of Houses	130		
Population	747	401	346

== Transportation ==
The closest airport to the village is Sahnewal Airport.
