= Balloke =

- Village
- Location in Punjab, India Balloke (India)
- Coordinates: 30.932888°N 75.7804752°E
- Country: India
- State: Punjab
- District: Ludhiana
- Tehsil: Ludhiana West

Government
  - Type: Panchayati raj (India)
  - Body: Gram panchayat

Languages
  - Official: Punjabi
  - Other spoken: Hindi
- Time zone: UTC+5:30 (IST)
- Telephone code: 0161
- ISO 3166 code: IN-PB
- Vehicle registration: PB-10
- Website: ludhiana.nic.in

Balloke is a village located in the Ludhiana West tehsil, of Ludhiana district, Punjab.

== Administration ==
The village is administrated by a Sarpanch who is an elected representative of village as per constitution of India and Panchayati raj (India).

Particulars	Total	Male	Female
Total No. of Houses	1,407		
Population	6,548	3,469	3,079
Child (0-6)	790	429	361
Schedule Caste	608	320	288
Schedule Tribe	0	0	0
Literacy	84.11 %	88.78%	78.88 %
Total Workers	2,000	1,653	347
Main Worker	1,704	0	0
Marginal Worker	296	184	112

== Cast ==
The village constitutes 9.29% of Schedule Caste and the village doesn't have any Schedule Tribe population.

== Air travel connectivity ==
The closest airport to the village is Sahnewal Airport.
