= Bhanohar =

- Village
- Location in Punjab, India Bhanohar (India)
- Coordinates: 30.8488987°N 75.7062077°E
- Country: India
- State: Punjab
- District: Ludhiana
- Tehsil: Ludhiana West

Government
  - Type: Panchayati raj (India)
  - Body: Gram panchayat

Languages
  - Official: Punjabi
  - Other spoken: Hindi
- Time zone: UTC+5:30 (IST)
- Telephone code: 0161
- ISO 3166 code: IN-PB
- Vehicle registration: PB-10
- Website: ludhiana.nic.in

Bhanohar is a village located in the Ludhiana West tehsil, of Ludhiana district, Punjab.

== Administration ==
The village is administrated by a Sarpanch who is an elected representative of village as per constitution of India and Panchayati raj (India).

Particulars	Total	Male	Female
Total No. of Houses	479		
Population	2,404	1,281	1,123
Child (0–6)	254	138	116
Schedule Caste	1,123	602	521
Schedule Tribe	0	0	0
Literacy	85.95 %	88.89 %	82.62 %
Total Workers	790	668	122
Main Worker	713	0	0
Marginal Worker	77	46	31

== Air travel connectivity ==
The closest airport to the village is Sahnewal Airport.
