= Talwandi Khurd =

- Village
- Location in Punjab, India Talwandi Khurd (India)
- Coordinates: 30.967963°N 75.7817502°E
- Country: India
- State: Punjab
- District: Ludhiana
- Tehsil: Jagraon

Government
  - Type: Inder Sarpanch(India)
  - Body: Gram panchayat

Languages Punjabi/Hindi/English
  - Official: Punjabi
  - Other spoken: Hindi
- Time zone: UTC+5:30 (IST)
- Telephone code: 0161
- ISO 3166 code: IN-PB
- Vehicle registration: PB-25
- Website: ludhiana.nic.in

Talwandi Khurd is a village located in the Ludhiana tehsil Jagraon, also known as Dham Talwandi khurd or chotti Talwandi. It is village of Inder saran Ludhiana district, Punjab.

== Administration ==
The village is administrated by a Sarpanch who is an elected representative of village as per constitution of India and Panchayati raj (India).

| Particulars | Total | Male | Female |
|---|---|---|---|
| Total No. of Houses | 46 | | |
| Population | 196 | 102 | 94 |

== Air travel connectivity ==
The closest airport to the village is Sahnewal Airport.
