= Latala (Ludhiana West) =

- Village
- Location in Punjab, India Latala (India)
- Coordinates: 30.6820818°N 75.7434367°E
- Country: India
- State: Punjab
- District: Ludhiana
- Tehsil: Ludhiana West

Government
  - Type: Panchayati raj (India)
  - Body: Gram panchayat

Languages
  - Official: Punjabi
  - Other spoken: Hindi
- Time zone: UTC+5:30 (IST)
- Telephone code: 0161
- ISO 3166 code: IN-PB
- Vehicle registration: PB-10
- Website: ludhiana.nic.in

Latala is a village located in the ludhiana west tehsil of Ludhiana District. It is one of the most facilitated villages in the district. It has a dairy plant towards its south established by ex-MLA Jassi Khangura which provides jobs to people of ten nearby villages. Also, the new multipurpose sports stadium is presented in village. The village's school provide good education to students. Also for farmers there is a grain market in village.

== Administration ==
The village is administrated by a Sarpanch who is an elected representative of the village as per the constitution of India and Panchayati raj (India).

Particulars	Total	Male	Female
Total No. of Houses	804		
Population	4,028	2,132	1,896

== Air travel connectivity ==
The closest airport to the village is Sahnewal Airport.
