= Dangora =

- Village
- Location in Punjab, India Dangora (India)
- Coordinates: 30.8030311°N 75.8875465°E
- Country: India
- State: Punjab
- District: Ludhiana
- Tehsil: Ludhiana West

Government
  - Type: Panchayati raj (India)
  - Body: Gram panchayat

Languages
  - Official: Punjabi
  - Other spoken: Hindi
- Time zone: UTC+5:30 (IST)
- Telephone code: 0161
- ISO 3166 code: IN-PB
- Vehicle registration: PB-10
- Website: ludhiana.nic.in

Dangora is a village located in the Ludhiana West tehsil, of Ludhiana district, Punjab.

== Administration ==
The village is administrated by a Sarpanch who is an elected representative of village as per constitution of India and Panchayati raj (India).

Particulars	Total	Male	Female
Total No. of Houses	106		
Population	557	286	271
Child (0-6)	44	25	19
Schedule Caste	175	94	81
Schedule Tribe	0	0	0
Literacy	86.35	89.66 %	82.94 %
Total Workers	343	188	155
Main Worker	175	0	0
Marginal Worker	168	36	132

== Air travel connectivity ==
The closest airport to the village is Sahnewal Airport.
