= Mahmudpura =

Mehmoodpura
- Village
- Location in Punjab, India Mehmoodpura (India)
- Coordinates: 30.8296006°N 75.8199553°E
- Country: India
- State: Punjab
- District: Ludhiana
- Tehsil: Ludhiana West

Government
  - Type: Panchayati raj (India)
  - Body: Gram panchayat

Languages
  - Official: Punjabi
  - Other spoken: Hindi
- Time zone: UTC+5:30 (IST)
- Telephone code: 0161
- ISO 3166 code: IN-PB
- Vehicle registration: PB-10
- Website: ludhiana.nic.in

Mehmoodpura is a village located in the Ludhiana West tehsil, of Ludhiana district, Punjab. It is situated on Dugri-Dhandra road. Gurudwara Alamghir sahib is about 5 km from the village. Baba sahib Singh Bedi is one of the major religious place in village. S. Bhan Singh of 47-Sikh regiment martyred in WW1 and his name is engraved on India Gate, New Delhi. His Memorial is also in Neuve-Chapelle Memorial in France. The village is one of 52 villages of Grewal clan. Major occupation of the villagers is related to agriculture. The total population is about 700. Gill railway station is about 1.5 km from village. The Nri’s of village has a lot of contribution in the development works of the village. 97% villagers practice sikhism. The nearby villages to Mehmoodpura are Dhandra, Manakwal, Gill, Kheri, Thakarwal, Alamghir Sahib, Dugri, Phullanwal.

== Administration ==
The village is administrated by a Sarpanch who is an elected representative of village as per constitution of India and Panchayati raj (India).

Particulars	Total	Male	Female
Total No. of Houses	126		
Population	720	389	331

== Air travel connectivity ==
The closest airport to the village is Sahnewal Airport.
