= Bulara =

- Village
- Location in Punjab, India Bulara (India)
- Coordinates: 30.8386274°N 75.8650632°E
- Country: India
- State: Punjab
- District: Ludhiana
- Tehsil: Ludhiana West

Government
  - Type: Panchayati raj (India)
  - Body: Gram panchayat

Languages
  - Official: Punjabi
  - Other spoken: Hindi
- Time zone: UTC+5:30 (IST)
- Telephone code: 0161
- ISO 3166 code: IN-PB
- Vehicle registration: PB-10
- Website: ludhiana.nic.in

Bulara is a village located in the Ludhiana West tehsil, of Ludhiana district, Punjab.

== Administration ==
The village is administrated by a Sarpanch who is an elected representative of village as per constitution of India and Panchayati raj (India).

Particulars	Total	Male	Female
Total No. of Houses	497		
Population	2,490	1,321	1,169
Child (0–6)	268	149	119
Schedule Caste	1,200	635	565
Schedule Tribe	0	0	0
Literacy	80.02 %	83.70 %	75.90 %
Total Workers	830	737	93
Main Worker	775	0	0
Marginal Worker	55	33	22

== Air travel connectivity ==
The closest airport to the village is Sahnewal Airport.
