= Garha (Ludhiana West) =

- Village
- Location in Punjab, India Garha (India)
- Coordinates: 30.9441431°N 75.6955902°E
- Country: India
- State: Punjab
- District: Ludhiana
- Tehsil: Ludhiana West

Government
  - Type: Panchayati raj (India)
  - Body: Gram panchayat

Languages
  - Official: Punjabi
  - Other spoken: Hindi
- Time zone: UTC+5:30 (IST)
- Telephone code: 0161
- ISO 3166 code: IN-PB
- Vehicle registration: PB-10
- Website: ludhiana.nic.in

Garha is a village located in the Ludhiana West tehsil, of Ludhiana district, Punjab.

== Administration ==
The village is administrated by a Sarpanch who is an elected representative of village as per constitution of India and Panchayati raj (India).

Particulars	Total	Male	Female
Total No. of Houses	31		
Population	176	90	86

== Child Sex Ratio details ==
The village population of children aged 0–6 is 11, accounting for 6.25% of the village's total population. The average sex ratio is 956 females per 1,000 males, which is higher than the state average of 895. The child sex ratio, according to the census, is 2,667, which is higher than the state average of 846 in Punjab.

== Air travel connectivity ==
The closest airport to the village is Sahnewal Airport.
