= Bholewal Jadid =

- Village
- Location in Punjab, India Bholewal Jadid (India)
- Coordinates: 30.997248°N 75.7072102°E
- Country: India
- State: Punjab
- District: Ludhiana
- Tehsil: Ludhiana West

Government
  - Type: Panchayati raj (India)
  - Body: Gram panchayat

Languages
  - Official: Punjabi
  - Other spoken: Hindi
- Time zone: UTC+5:30 (IST)
- Telephone code: 0161
- ISO 3166 code: IN-PB
- Vehicle registration: PB-10
- Website: ludhiana.nic.in

Bholewal Jadid is a village located in the Ludhiana West tehsil, of Ludhiana district, Punjab.

== Administration ==
The village is administrated by a Sarpanch who is an elected representative of village as per constitution of India and Panchayati raj (India).

Particulars	Total	Male	Female
Total No. of Houses	114		
Population	511	260	251
Child (0–6)	72	36	36
Schedule Caste	399	202	197
Schedule Tribe	0	0	0
Literacy	46.70 %	55.36 %	37.67 %
Total Workers	329	168	161
Main Worker	234	0	0
Marginal Worker	95	25	70

== Air travel connectivity ==
The closest airport to the village is Sahnewal Airport.
