= Burj Lambra =

- Village
- Location in Punjab, India Burj Lambra (India)
- Coordinates: 30.9557047°N 75.6879687°E
- Country: India
- State: Punjab
- District: Ludhiana
- Tehsil: Ludhiana West

Government
  - Type: Panchayati raj (India)
  - Body: Gram panchayat

Languages
  - Official: Punjabi
  - Other spoken: Hindi
- Time zone: UTC+5:30 (IST)
- Telephone code: 0161
- ISO 3166 code: IN-PB
- Vehicle registration: PB-10
- Website: ludhiana.nic.in

Burj Lambra is a village located in the Ludhiana West tehsil, of Ludhiana district, Punjab.

== Administration ==
The village is administrated by a Sarpanch who is an elected representative of village as per constitution of India and Panchayati raj (India).

Particulars	Total	Male	Female
Total No. of Houses	37		
Population	190	95	95
Child (0–6)	28	15	13
Schedule Caste	34	16	18
Schedule Tribe	0	0	0
Literacy	86.42 %	90.00 %	82.93 %
Total Workers	61	57	04
Main Worker	59	0	0
Marginal Worker	02	01	01

== Air travel connectivity ==
The closest airport to the village is Sahnewal Airport.
