= Bholewal Qadim =

- Village
- Location in Punjab, India Bholewal Qadim (India)
- Coordinates: 31.009564°N 75.7465482°E
- Country: India
- State: Punjab
- District: Ludhiana
- Tehsil: Ludhiana West

Government
  - Type: Panchayati raj (India)
  - Body: Gram panchayat

Languages
  - Official: Punjabi
  - Other spoken: Hindi
- Time zone: UTC+5:30 (IST)
- Telephone code: 0161
- ISO 3166 code: IN-PB
- Vehicle registration: PB-10
- Website: ludhiana.nic.in

Bholewal Qadim is a village located in the Ludhiana West tehsil, of Ludhiana district, Punjab.

== Administration ==
The village is administrated by a Sarpanch who is an elected representative of village as per constitution of India and Panchayati raj (India).

Particulars	Total	Male	Female
Total No. of Houses	70		
Population	352	194	158
Child (0-6)	47	28	119
Schedule Caste	219	120	99
Schedule Tribe	0	0	0
Literacy	65.25 %	69.88 %	59.71 %
Total Workers	213	124	89
Main Worker	195	0	0
Marginal Worker	18	5	13

== Air travel connectivity ==
The closest airport to the village is Sahnewal Airport.
