= Bahadarke =

- Village
- Location in Punjab, India Bahadarke (India)
- Coordinates: 30.9609231°N 75.8306102°E
- Country: India
- State: Punjab
- District: Ludhiana
- Tehsil: Ludhiana West

Government
  - Type: Panchayati raj (India)
  - Body: Gram panchayat

Languages
  - Official: Punjabi
  - Other spoken: Hindi
- Time zone: UTC+5:30 (IST)
- Telephone code: 0161
- ISO 3166 code: IN-PB
- Vehicle registration: PB-10
- Website: ludhiana.nic.in

Bahadarke is a village located in the Ludhiana West tehsil, of Ludhiana district, Punjab.

== Administration ==
The village is administrated by a Sarpanch who is an elected representative of village as per constitution of India and Panchayati raj (India).

Particulars	Total	Male	Female
Total No. of Houses	607		
Population	3,447	1,888	1,559
Child (0–6)	390	218	172
Schedule Caste	1,523	792	731
Schedule Tribe	0	0	0
Literacy	76.87 %	81.44 %	71.38 %
Total Workers	1,240	1,115	125
Main Worker	1,155	0	0
Marginal Worker	85	64	21

== Cast ==
The village constitutes 44.18% of Schedule Caste and the village doesn't have any Schedule Tribe population.

== Air travel connectivity ==
The closest airport to the village is Sahnewal Airport.
