= Rattan (Ludhiana West) =

- Village
- Location in Punjab, India Rattan (India)
- Coordinates: 30.8015381°N 75.7352352°E
- Country: India
- State: Punjab
- District: Ludhiana
- Tehsil: Ludhiana West

Government
  - Type: Panchayati raj (India)
  - Body: Gram panchayat

Languages
  - Official: Punjabi
  - Other spoken: Hindi
- Time zone: UTC+5:30 (IST)
- Telephone code: 0161
- ISO 3166 code: IN-PB
- Vehicle registration: PB-10
- Website: ludhiana.nic.in

Rattan is a village located in the Ludhiana West tehsil, of Ludhiana district, Punjab.

== Administration ==
The village is administrated by a Sarpanch who is an elected representative of village as per constitution of India and Panchayati raj (India).Advocate Manprinder Singh ji is Currently elected representative in Rattan Village.

Particulars	Total	Male	Female
Total No. of Houses	232		
Population	1,223	641	582

== Air travel connectivity ==
The closest airport to the village is Sahnewal Airport.
