= Bounker Dogran =

- Village
- Location in Punjab, India Bounker Dogran (India)
- Coordinates: 30.899956°N 75.8553988°E
- Country: India
- State: Punjab
- District: Ludhiana
- Tehsil: Ludhiana West

Government
  - Type: Panchayati raj (India)
  - Body: Gram panchayat

Languages
  - Official: Punjabi
  - Other spoken: Hindi
- Time zone: UTC+5:30 (IST)
- Telephone code: 0161
- ISO 3166 code: IN-PB
- Vehicle registration: PB-10
- Website: ludhiana.nic.in

Bounker Dogran is a village located in the Ludhiana West tehsil, of Ludhiana district, Punjab.

== Administration ==
The village is administrated by a Sarpanch who is an elected representative of village as per constitution of India and Panchayati raj (India).

Particulars	Total	Male	Female
Total No. of Houses	526		
Population	2,580	1,359	1,221
Child (0–6)	369	199	170
Schedule Caste	1,425	750	675
Schedule Tribe	0	0	0
Literacy	65.85 %	70.95 %	60.23 %
Total Workers	751	712	39
Main Worker	693	0	0
Marginal Worker	58	52	06

== Air travel connectivity ==
The closest airport to the village is Sahnewal Airport.
