= Allowal (Ludhiana West) =

- Village
- Location in Punjab, India Allowal (India)
- Coordinates: 30.8013862°N 75.8541047°E
- Country: India
- State: Punjab
- District: Ludhiana
- Tehsil: Ludhiana West

Government
  - Type: Panchayati raj (India)
  - Body: Gram panchayat

Languages
  - Official: Punjabi
  - Other spoken: Hindi
- Time zone: UTC+5:30 (IST)
- Telephone code: 0161
- ISO 3166 code: IN-PB
- Vehicle registration: PB-10
- Website: ludhiana.nic.in

Allowal is a village located in the Ludhiana West tehsil, of Ludhiana district, Punjab.

== Administration ==
The village is administrated by a Sarpanch who is an elected representative of village as per constitution of India and Panchayati raj (India).

Particulars	Total	Male	Female
Total No. of Houses	135		
Population	624	325	299
Child (0–6)	70	41	29
Schedule Caste	376	188	188
Schedule Tribe	0	0	0
Literacy	77.80%	83.10%	72.22%
Total Workers	223	191	32
Main Worker	221	0	0
Marginal Worker	02	0	02

== Cast ==
The village constitutes 60.26% of Schedule Caste and the village doesn't have any Schedule Tribe population.

== Air travel connectivity ==
The closest airport to the village is Sahnewal Airport.
