= Assi Khurd =

- Village
- Location in Punjab, India Assi Khurd (India)
- Coordinates: 30.7567231°N 75.7764803°E
- Country: India
- State: Punjab
- District: Ludhiana
- Tehsil: Ludhiana West

Government
  - Type: Panchayati raj (India)
  - Body: Gram panchayat

Languages
  - Official: Punjabi
  - Other spoken: Hindi
- Time zone: UTC+5:30 (IST)
- Telephone code: 0161
- ISO 3166 code: IN-PB
- Vehicle registration: PB-10
- Website: ludhiana.nic.in

Assi Khurd is a village located in the Ludhiana West tehsil, of Ludhiana district, Punjab.

== Administration ==
The village is administrated by a Sarpanch who is an elected representative of village as per constitution of India and Panchayati raj (India).

Particulars	Total	Male	Female
Total No. of Houses	133		
Population	604	314	290
Child (0–6)	37	23	14
Schedule Caste	206	99	107
Schedule Tribe	0	0	0
Literacy	85.36%	90.03%	80.43%
Total Workers	248	187	61
Main Worker	241	0	0
Marginal Worker	07	02	05

== Cast ==
The village constitutes 34.11% of Schedule Caste and the village doesn't have any Schedule Tribe population.

== Air travel connectivity ==
The closest airport to the village is Sahnewal Airport.
