= Chhokar (Ludhiana West) =

- Village
- Location in Punjab, India Chhokar (India)
- Coordinates: 30.8121631°N 75.7306302°E
- Country: India
- State: Punjab
- District: Ludhiana
- Tehsil: Ludhiana West

Government
  - Type: Panchayati raj (India)
  - Body: Gram panchayat

Languages
  - Official: Punjabi
  - Other spoken: Hindi
- Time zone: UTC+5:30 (IST)
- Telephone code: 0161
- ISO 3166 code: IN-PB
- Vehicle registration: PB-10
- Website: ludhiana.nic.in

Chhokar is a village located in the Ludhiana West tehsil, of Ludhiana district, Punjab.

== Administration ==
The village is administrated by a Sarpanch who is an elected representative of village as per constitution of India and Panchayati raj (India).

Particulars	Total	Male	Female
Total No. of Houses	122		
Population	618	321	297
Child (0-6)	58	28	30
Schedule Caste	391	203	188
Schedule Tribe	0	0	0
Literacy	84.64 %	88.05 %	80.90 %
Total Workers	216	193	23
Main Worker	207	0	0
Marginal Worker	9	6	3

== Air travel connectivity ==
The closest airport to the village is Sahnewal Airport.
