= Khaira Bet =

Village in Punjab, India

- Village
- Location in Punjab, India Khaira Bet (India)
- Coordinates: 30.9673368°N 75.6884429°E
- Country: India
- State: Punjab
- District: Ludhiana
- Tehsil: Ludhiana West

Government
  - Type: Panchayati raj (India)
  - Body: Gram panchayat

Languages
  - Official: Punjabi
- Time zone: UTC+5:30 (IST)
- Telephone code: 0161
- ISO 3166 code: IN-PB
- Vehicle registration: PB-10
- Website: ludhiana.nic.in

Khaira Bet is a village in the Ludhiana district of the Indian state of Punjab. It is situated by the Sutlej River and is 23 kilometers from the city of Ludhiana. The village has an estimated population of 3500 people.
