= Phallewal =

Phallewal phallewal kalan
- Village
- Location in Punjab, India Phallewal (India)
- Coordinates: 30.7236495°N 75.7401108°E
- Country: India
- State: Punjab
- District: Ludhiana
- Tehsil: Ludhiana West

Government
  - Type: Panchayati raj (India)
  - Body: Gram panchayat

Languages
  - Official: Punjabi
  - Other spoken: Hindi
- Time zone: UTC+5:30 (IST)
- Postal code: 141202
- Telephone code: 0161
- ISO 3166 code: IN-PB
- Vehicle registration: PB-10
- Website: ludhiana.nic.in

Phallewal is a village located in the Ludhiana West tehsil, of Ludhiana district, Punjab.

== Administration ==
The village is administrated by a Sarpanch who is an elected representative of village as per constitution of India and Panchayati raj (India). It is known for its Cricket Team, Kabaddi Team, Football Team, and more. Many tournaments are held in the village by the people of the village, panchayat, NRI's and by the players also.

Particulars	Total	Male	Female
Total No. of Houses	646		
Population	3,045	1,479	1,566

== Air travel connectivity ==
The closest airport to the village is Sahnewal Airport.
