= Akalgarh Urf Lalton Khurd =

Lalton Khurd
- Village
- Location in Punjab, India Lalton Khurd (India)
- Coordinates: 30.8551438°N 75.7415304°E
- Country: India
- State: Punjab
- District: Ludhiana
- Tehsil: Ludhiana West

Government
  - Type: Panchayati raj (India)
  - Body: Gram panchayat

Population
  - Total: 1,436
- Sex ratio 752/684 ♂/♀

Languages
  - Official: Punjabi
- Time zone: UTC+5:30 (IST)
- Telephone code: 0161
- ISO 3166 code: IN-PB
- Vehicle registration: PB-10
- Website: ludhiana.nic.in

Lalton Khurd is a village located in the Ludhiana West tehsil, of Ludhiana district, Punjab.

== Administration ==
The village is administrated by a Sarpanch who is an elected representative of village as per constitution of India and Panchayati raj (India).

Particulars	Total	Male	Female
Total No. of Houses	300		
Population	1,436	752	684
Child (0–6)	141	73	68
Schedule Caste	597	310	287
Schedule Tribe	0	0	0
Literacy	86.72 %	89.25%	83.93 %
Total Workers	652	475	177
Main Worker	428	0	0
Marginal Worker	224	94	130

== Cast ==
The village constitutes 41.57% of Schedule Caste and the village doesn't have any Schedule Tribe population.

== Air travel connectivity ==
The closest airport to the village is Sahnewal Airport.
