= Ghungrana =

- Village
- Location in Punjab, India Ghungrana (India)
- Coordinates: 30.7153393°N 75.8118867°E
- Country: India
- State: Punjab
- District: Ludhiana
- Tehsil: Ludhiana West

Government
  - Type: Panchayati raj (India)
  - Body: Gram panchayat

Languages
  - Official: Punjabi
  - Other spoken: Hindi
- Time zone: UTC+5:30 (IST)
- Telephone code: 0161
- ISO 3166 code: IN-PB
- Vehicle registration: PB-10
- Website: ludhiana.nic.in

Ghungrana is a village located in the Ludhiana West tehsil, of Ludhiana district, Punjab.

== Administration ==
The village is administrated by Sarpanch Budh Singh's wife Parkash kaur who is an elected representative of village as per constitution of India and Panchayati raj (India). The village has a very old railway station. The towns of Dehlon and Ahemdgarh are nearby. Ghunghrana is surrounded by villages Kalakh, Jartauli and Rangian. It falls under Pakhowal block and police station Jodhan.

The village in the region is known to be the village of Sardars. The ex chairman of Punjab Agro Industries Punjab Sardar Jagjit Singh Dhillon belongs to the village. Most residents of Ghunghrana belong to the Jatt clan Dhillon. Dry port has been constructed in the land of the village and adjoining village Khera.

Particulars	Total	Male	Female
Total No. of Houses	659		
Population	3,293	1,766	1,527

== Child Sex Ratio details ==
The village population of children with an age group from 0-6 is 329 which makes up 9.99% of total population of village. Average Sex Ratio is 865 per 1000 males which is lower than the state average of 895. The child Sex Ratio as per census is 552, lower than average of 846 in the state of Punjab.

== Air travel connectivity ==
The closest airport to the village is Sahnewal Airport.
