= Dhaipai =

- Village
- Location in Punjab, India Dhaipai (India)
- Coordinates: 30.778446°N 75.7203912°E
- Country: India
- State: Punjab
- District: Ludhiana
- Tehsil: Ludhiana West

Government
  - Type: Panchayati raj (India)
  - Body: Gram panchayat

Languages
  - Official: Punjabi
  - Other spoken: Hindi
- Time zone: UTC+5:30 (IST)
- Telephone code: 0161
- ISO 3166 code: IN-PB
- Vehicle registration: PB-10
- Website: ludhiana.nic.in

Dhaipai is a village located in the Ludhiana West tehsil, of Ludhiana district, Punjab.

== Administration ==
The village is administrated by a Sarpanch who is an elected representative of village as per constitution of India and Panchayati raj (India).

Particulars	Total	Male	Female
Total No. of Houses	518		
Population	2,637	1,418	1,219
Child (0-6)	279	155	124
Schedule Caste	1,320	706	614
Schedule Tribe	0	0	0
Literacy	81.09 %	86.94 %	74.34 %
Total Workers	912	739	173
Main Worker	807	0	0
Marginal Worker	105	78	27

== Air travel connectivity ==
The closest airport to the village is Sahnewal Airport.
