= Chuharpura =

- Village
- Location in Punjab, India Chuharpura (India)
- Coordinates: 30.9425781°N 75.7825802°E
- Country: India
- State: Punjab
- District: Ludhiana
- Tehsil: Ludhiana West

Government
  - Type: Panchayati raj (India)
  - Body: Gram panchayat

Languages
  - Official: Punjabi
  - Other spoken: Hindi
- Time zone: UTC+5:30 (IST)
- Telephone code: 0161
- ISO 3166 code: IN-PB
- Vehicle registration: PB-10
- Website: ludhiana.nic.in

Chuharpura is a village located in the Ludhiana West tehsil, of Ludhiana district, Punjab.

== Administration ==
The village is administrated by a Sarpanch who is an elected representative of the village as per the constitution of India and Panchayati Raj.

Particulars	Total	Male	Female
Total No. of Houses	135		
Population	710	391	319
Child (0-6)	91	47	44
Schedule Caste	240	140	100
Schedule Tribe	0	0	0
Literacy	78.51 %	81.40 %	74.91 %
Total Workers	230	230	17
Main Worker	209	0	0
Marginal Worker	21	19	02

== Air travel connectivity ==
The closest airport to the village is Sahnewal Airport.
