= Mor Karima =

Village in Sidhwan Bet Mandal, India

Coordinates: 30°50′N 75°36′E

Mor Karima is a village in Sidhwan Bet Mandal located in Ludhiana district, Punjab, India. Mor Karima has a population of 1316 living in 216 households. The village is one of 3789 villages in Punjab that have a scheduled caste population of 40% and above.

== Geography ==
The exact cartographic coordinates of Mor Karima are 30.83456, 75.60699. Other nearby villages within Sidwhan Bet Mandal are Sidhwan Bet, Abupura, Akuwal, Aliwal, Amargarh Kaler, Baghian, Bahadarke, Baniewal, Barsal, Bassian Bet, and Bhaini Araian. Mor Karima is 112 kilometers (70 mi) from Chandigarh, the capital of both Punjab and Haryana.

== Archeological Findings ==
Medieval and terracotta artifacts from the Harappan and Kushana civilizations have been found in Mor Karima, buried two meters underground in a large area of 50,000 square meters. These artifacts are from the Mature Harappan era (2600 - 1900 BCE).

== Natural Resources ==
Salt petre is found in Mor Karima and appears on the ground as an alkaline efflorescence in the summer months. Every seven to ten days, three to four centimeters of the ground is scraped to encourage production of salt petre. Cloudy weather and rainfall during the harvest season negatively affects salt petre production.

There are two sources of safe water in Mor Karima which provide 1.8 litres per capita per day. There is significantly less water available for villages in Mor Karima than there are in other villages such as Narangwal, whose water sources provide 39 litres per capacity per day. The Indian Government's Accelerated Rural Water Supply Programme has recognized Mor Karima as having a water status of Not Covered (NC) and in need of funding to provide adequate sources of clean water.

== Education ==
Sarkari Primary School is the only government primary school located in Mor Karima. There is also a government medium school. Some students attend Mahant Lachhman Dass (MLD) High School, a private English and Punjabi medium school located in Talwandi Kalan, Ludhiana, Punjab.

Of the 1212 persons living in Mor Karima at the time of the 2001 India Census, 883 persons were literate; 499 men and 384 women.

== Religion ==
There is 2 Gurudwaras in Village-

- Gurudwara Singh Sabha
- Gurudwara Ravidass Bhagat

== Government and Infrastructure ==
The sarpanch of Mor Karima is Gurpreet Kaur and Panch is Subedar Niranjan Singh, Kulwant Singh, and Bibi Gurdeep Kaur. Mor Karima's pin/postal code is 142 023. The postal office that serves Mor Karima is Mor Karima Branch Office Post Office.

There are 63 Rural Household District Exchange Lines providing telephone services to Mor Karima. The SDCA code for Mor Karima is 1624.

== Nearby Colleges ==
- LGC (4 km)
- LPC (4 km)
- Bajaj College Chaukimaan(4 km)
- CT University Sidhwan (5 km)
- GHG Khalda College Gurusar (12 km)
- GHG College Sidhwan Khurd( 7 km)

== Nearby markets ==
- Sowaadi Kalan Market (4 km)
- Mullanpur (8 km)
- Jagraon (9 km)
- Ludhiana (26 km)
- Chaukimaan (4 km)
