= Pandher Kheri =

Pandher Kheri Kheri
- village
- Location in Punjab, India Pandher Kheri (India)
- Coordinates: 30°54′N 75°50′E
- Country: India
- State: Punjab
- District: Ludhiana

Languages
  - Official: Punjabi
- Time zone: UTC+5:30 (IST)
- PIN: 141117
- Telephone code: 855691
- Vehicle registration: PB-55
- Coastline: 0 kilometres (0 mi)
- Nearest city: Ahmedgarh
- Lok Sabha constituency: Ludhiana Now Fatehgarh Sahib

Pandher Kheri is a small village located in the Indian state of Punjab in Ludhiana district.

It was created about 200 years ago and is situated near a small town of Maloudh near Malerkotla. Its residents are mostly Pandher jats and it is the birthplace of freedom fighter Chanan Singh Warola, also known as Chanan Singh Hunjan, who remained Sarpanch of this village for 27 consecutive years. He was honored by the President of India twice with Tamra Patra.
