= Sarih, Punjab =

Sarih
- Village
- Location in Punjab, India Sarih (India)
- Coordinates: 31.1407712°N 75.5549954°E
- Country: India
- State: Punjab
- District: Jalandhar
- Tehsil: Nakodar

Government
  - Type: Panchayati raj (India)
  - Body: Gram panchayat

Languages
  - Official: Punjabi
  - Other spoken: Hindi
- Time zone: UTC+5:30 (IST)
- Telephone code: 0161
- ISO 3166 code: IN-PB
- Vehicle registration: PB-08
- Website: ludhiana.nic.in

Sarih is a village located in the Jalandhar District, Of Doaba region Punjab.

== Administration ==
The village is administrated by a Sarpanch who is an elected representative of village as per constitution of India and Panchayati raj (India).

Particulars	Total	Male	Female
Total No. of Houses	503		
Population	2,638	1,416	1,222

== Air travel connectivity ==
The closest airport to the village is Sahnewal Airport.
