= Ballowal =

- Village
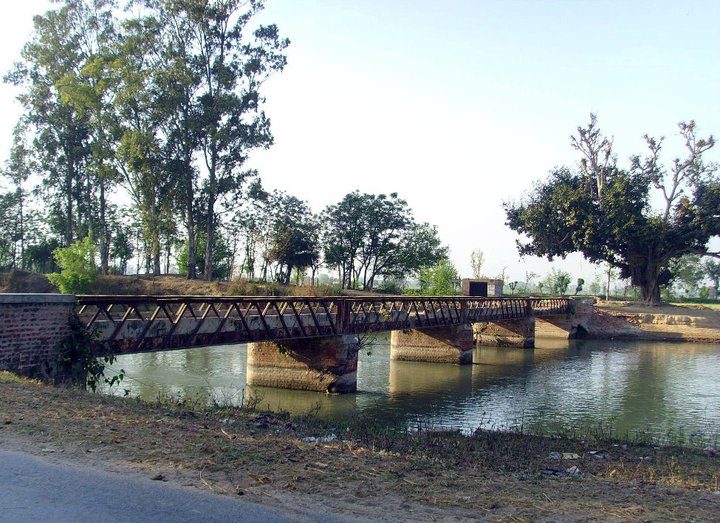
- Ballowal Old Bridge

- Location in Punjab, India Ballowal (India)
- Coordinates: 30.769661°N 75.747771°E
- Country: India
- State: Punjab
- District: Ludhiana

Government
  - Type: Panchayati raj (India)
  - Body: Gram panchayat

Area
  - Total: 4 km^{2} (1.5 sq mi)
- Elevation: 246 m (807 ft)

Population
  - Total: 2,500
  - Density: 630/km^{2} (1,600/sq mi)

Languages
  - Official: Punjabi
- Time zone: UTC+5:30 (IST)
- PIN: 141202
- Telephone code: 0161
- Vehicle registration: PB-10
- Nearest city: Ludhiana
- Lok Sabha constituency: Ludhiana
- Vidhan Sabha constituency: Dakha
- Website: www.ballowal.in

Ballowal (Punjabi: ਬੱਲੋਵਾਲ) is a small village situated in district Ludhiana, Punjab, India. This village is about 15 km from Ludhiana city. The population of this village is approximately 2500. There is a canal on one side of the village and a suaa (ਸੂਆ) on the other side of the village. Although it is a small village, yet it has all the necessary basic facilities for the people. A Government School, in this village, provides education to the students. A dispensary provides medical facilities to the villagers. A veterinary hospital keeps the animals, especially buffaloes and cows, healthy by giving them necessary meditation.

== Geography ==
Ballowal is located at 30.769661°N 75.747771°E. It has an average elevation of 246 metres (807 ft).

== Climate ==
Ballowal features a semiarid climate under the Köppen climate classification, with three defined seasons; summer, monsoon and winter. Summers, which range from April through June in the village, tends to be very hot and very dry with average highs in May and June hovering around 40 degrees Celsius. The monsoon season which runs from July through September, sees a slight decrease in average temperatures but an increase in humidity. The bulk of the village's annual precipitation is received during the monsoon season. October and November is dry; more similar to a summer month than a monsoon month, though November is noticeably cooler than a summer month. Average temperatures though tend to decrease during the course of each of these months. December through February, which forms the winter months, is relatively mild with warm days and chilly nights. March is more of a sharp transitional month from winter to summer. Ballowal on average sees roughly 730 mm of precipitation annually.

== Photo gallery ==
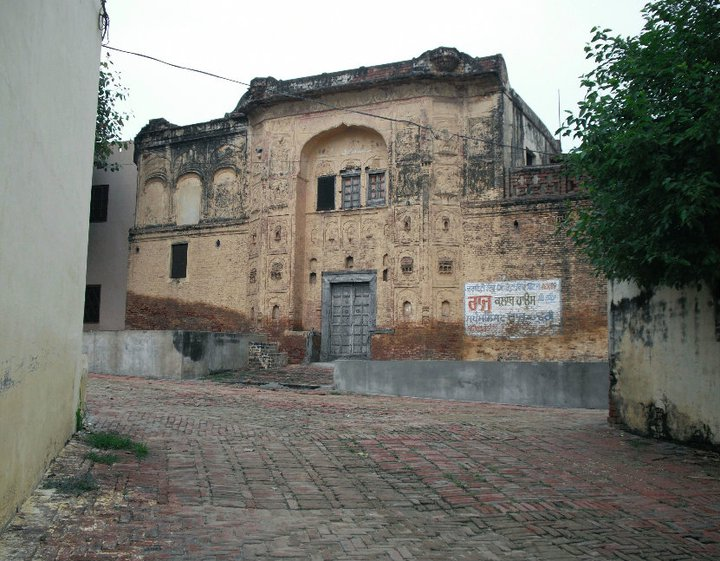
Old House

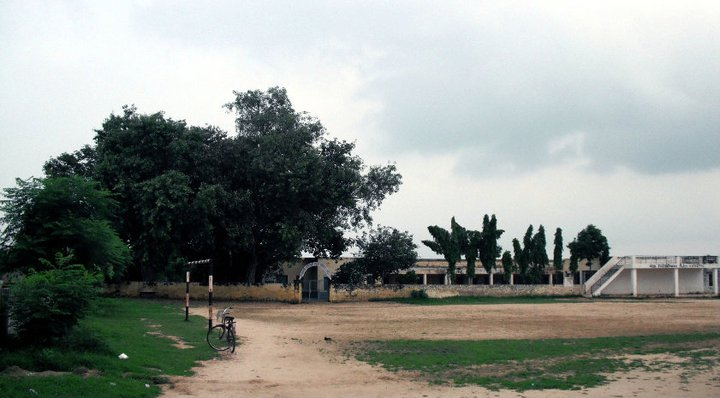
Govt. School

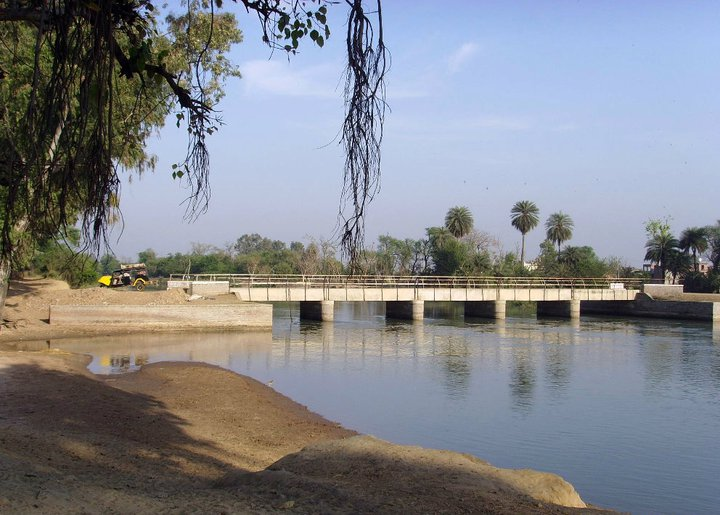
New Bridge

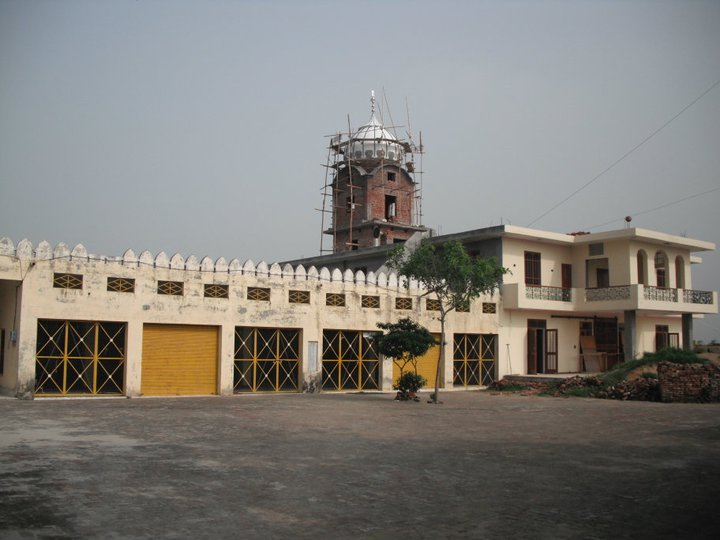
Gurdwara Sahib

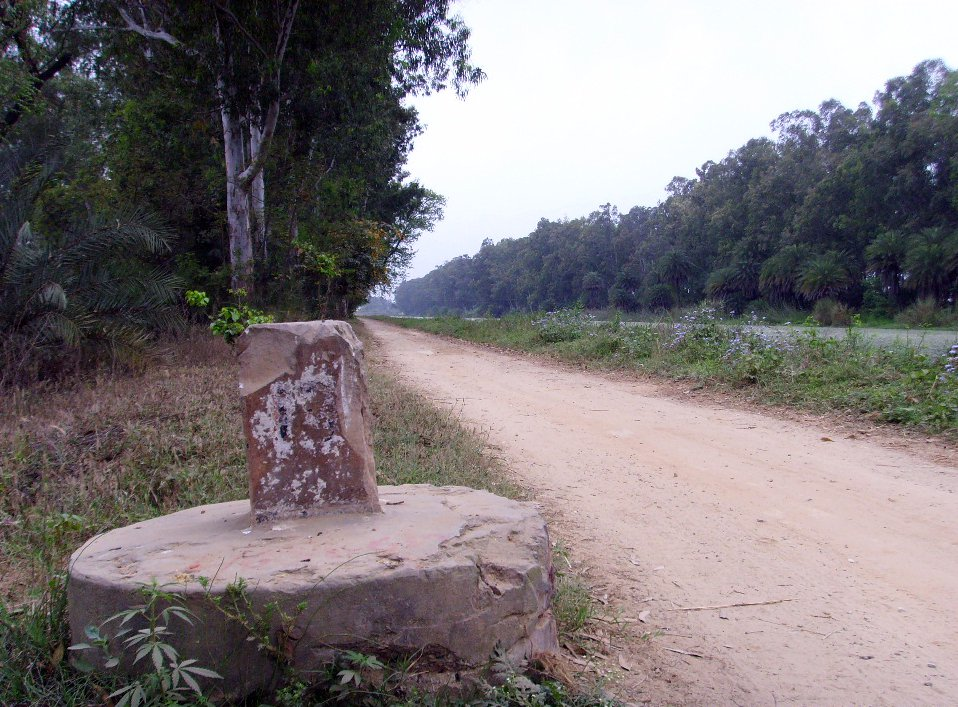
Old Mile Stone

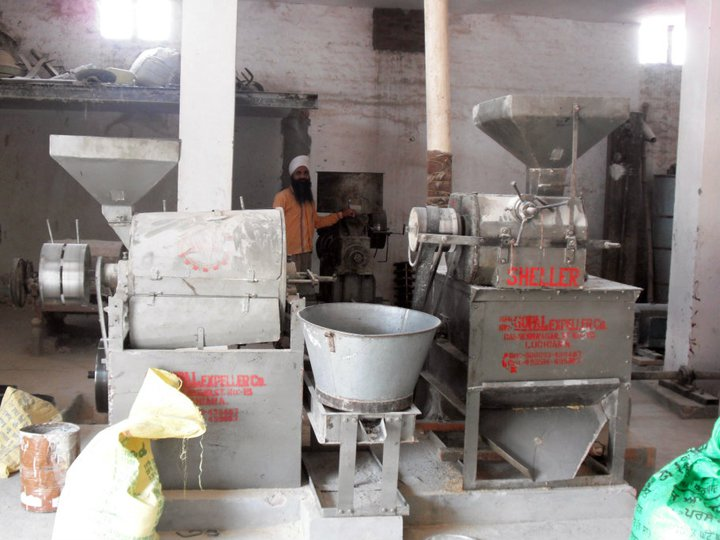
Aata Chakki

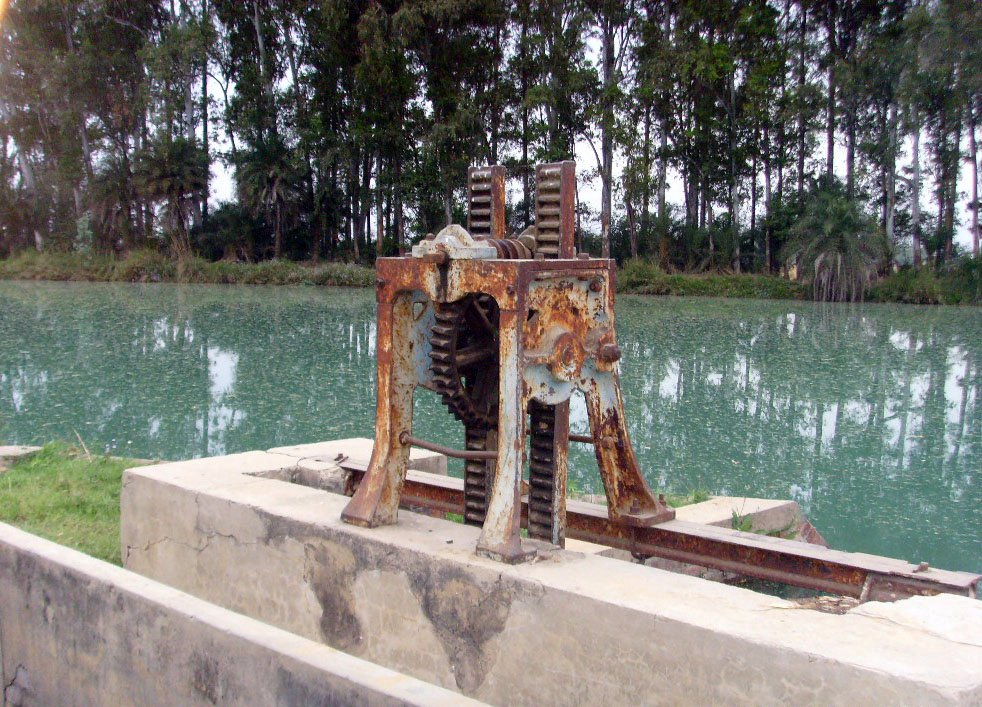
Rajbaha Opener Key

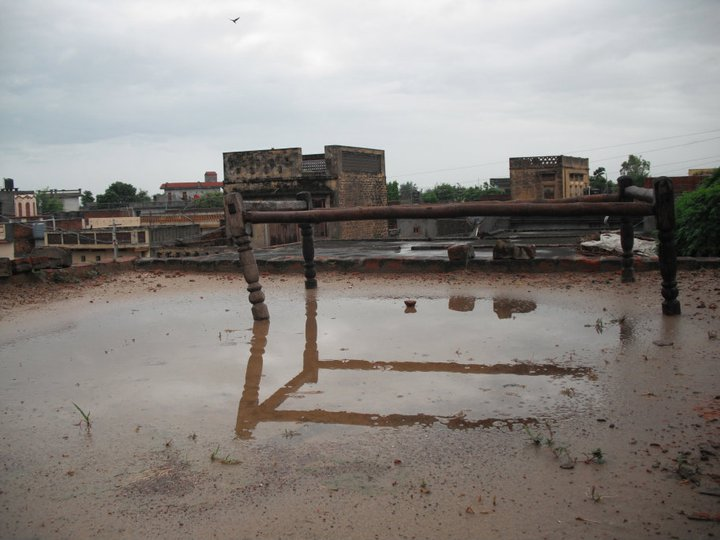
Rainy Season

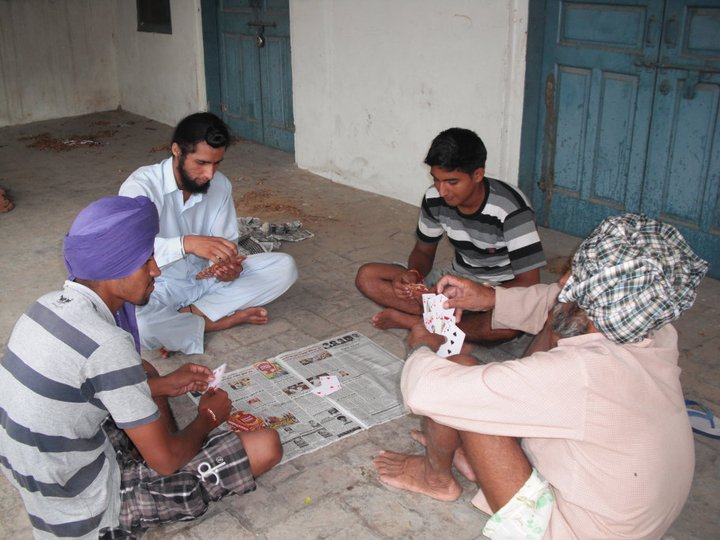
Playing Cards

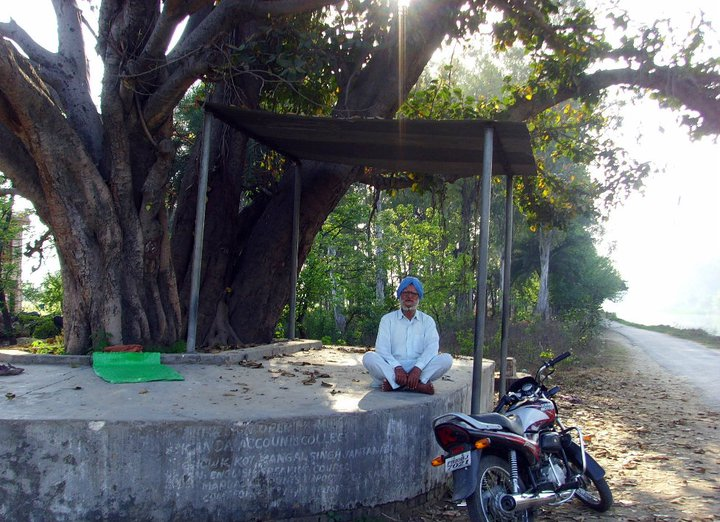
Old Man

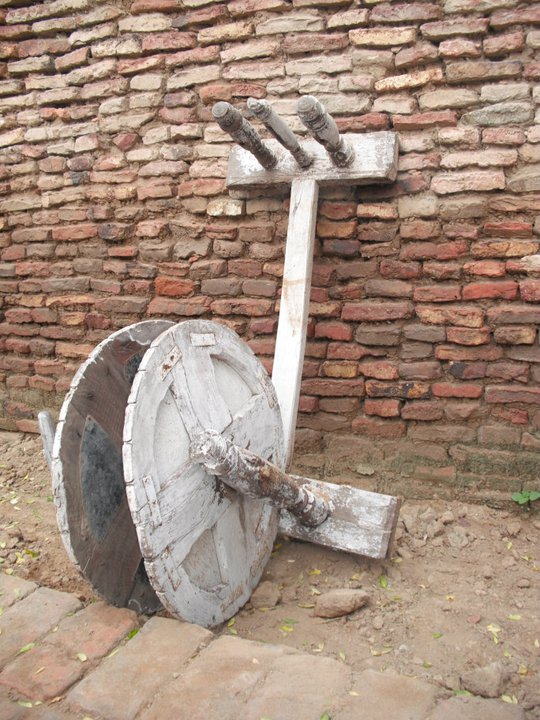
Old Charkha

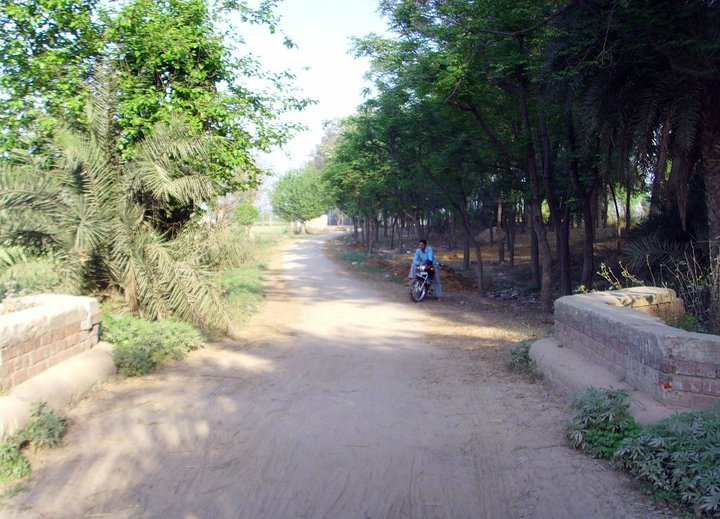
Kassi wala Raah

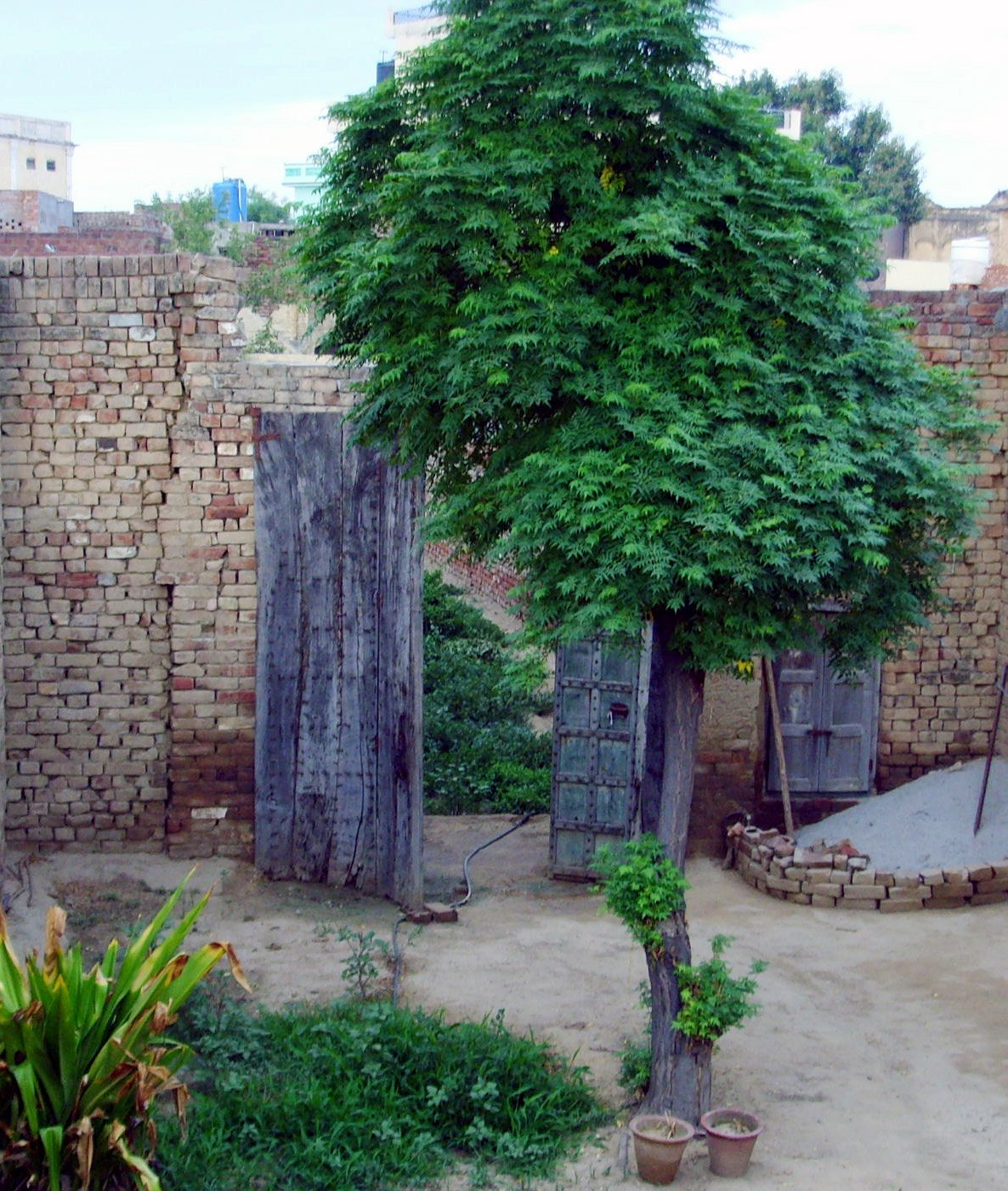
Historical Gate

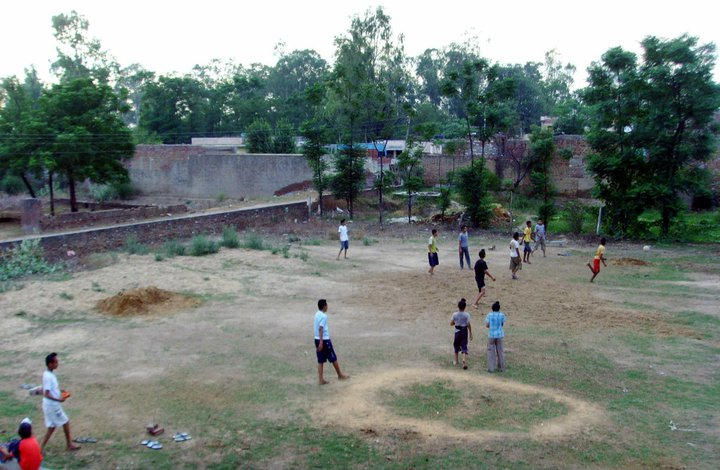
Desi Playground

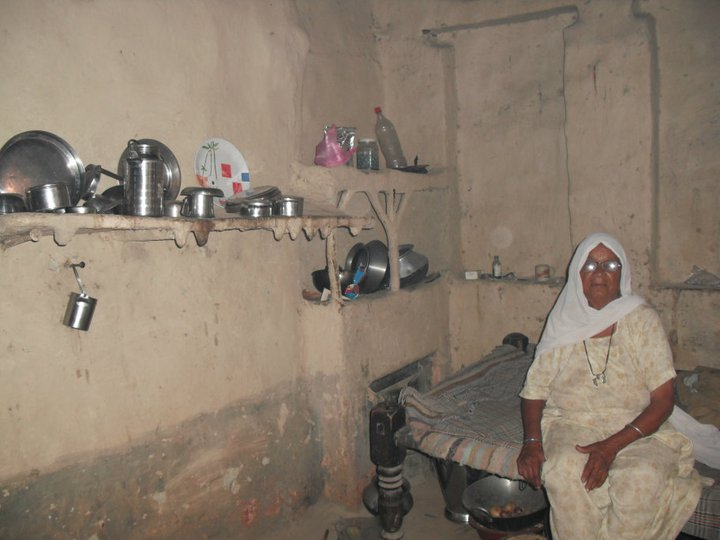
Old Culture

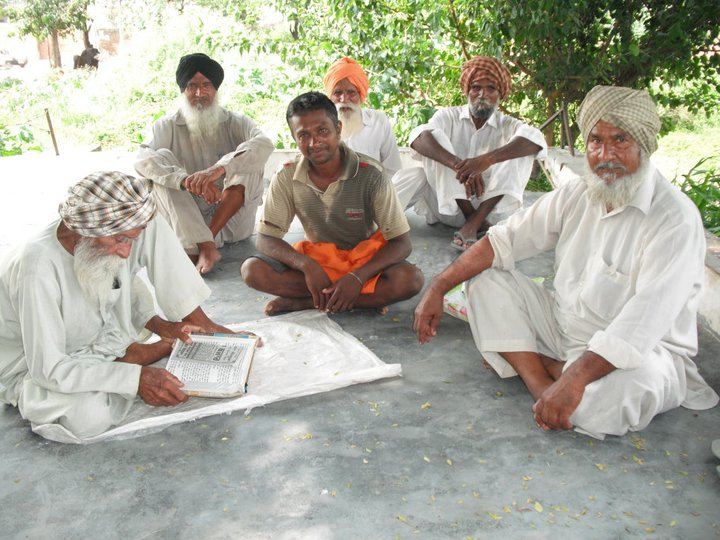
Baba Gajjan Singh

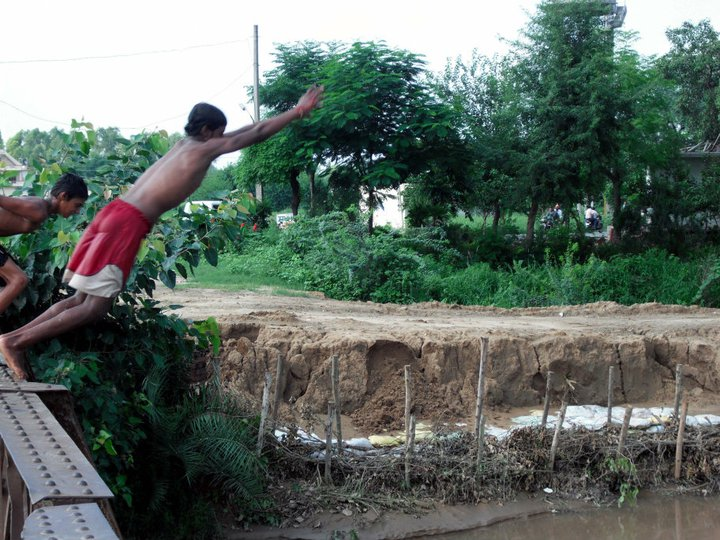
Children Diving in Canal
