= Phullanwal =

- Neighborhood of Ludhiana
- Location in Punjab, India Phullanwal (India)
- Coordinates: 30.8644216°N 75.8080398°E
- Country: India
- State: Punjab
- District: Ludhiana
- City: Ludhiana

Government
  - Type: Mayor–council
  - Body: Ludhiana Municipal Corporation

Languages
  - Official: Punjabi
  - Other spoken: Hindi
- Time zone: UTC+5:30 (IST)
- Telephone code: 0161
- ISO 3166 code: IN-PB
- Vehicle registration: PB-10
- Website: ludhiana.nic.in

Phullanwal is an area located in Ludhiana, India.

== Location ==
Phullanwal is a neighborhood located in the city of Ludhiana, in the state of Punjab, India. It is situated at coordinates 30.8644214°N 75.8080398°E.

== Administration ==
Phullanwal falls under the jurisdiction of the Ludhiana Municipal Corporation. The area is part of the Ahmedabad district and is represented in the Lok Sabha constituency of Ludhiana.

== Demographics and Language ==
The official languages spoken in Phullanwal are Punjabi and Hindi. The area follows the Indian Standard Time (UTC+5:30).

== Postal Information ==
The postal code for Phullanwal is 141013. The area code for telephone services is 91-079.

== Transportation ==
Phullanwal is well-connected by road and public transportation. The nearest railway station is Model Grem, and the closest airport is Sahnewal Airport.
