= Kaind =

- village
- Location in India Kaind (India)
- Coordinates: 30.785083°N 75.859534°E
- Country: India

Population
  - Total: 1,500

Languages
- Time zone: UTC+5:30 (IST)
- Telephone code: 0161
- Nearest city: Ludhiana

Kaind is a small village about 14 kilometers south of Ludhiana, Punjab, India. It is located on Malerkotla road, a community of about 1000 residents.

Many of its former residents now reside in United States, Canada, UK, Australia And Europe . The main surname is "Pannu" and others include "Sandhu","Sidhu","Dhillon", "Grewal" And."Bangar". About 9 families live in or around Bay Area CA. There are a number of Pannu families in both Surrey, British Columbia and Brampton, Ontario.
