= Jassian =

- Village
- Location within Punjab Location within India
- Coordinates: 30.9439°N 75.817°E
- Country: India
- State: Punjab
- District: Ludhiana

Population
  - Total: 2,748
- Time zone: UTC+5:30 (IST)
- Postal code: 141008
- ISO 3166 code: IN-PB

Jassian is a village in the Ludhiana district of the state of Punjab, India. It is located on the Northwest side of Jassian road and new elected sarpanch Harjeet Singh Cheema. The closest city to Jassian is the city of Ludhiana. It currently has a population of about 2748.
