= Ludhiana Lok Sabha constituency =

Lok Sabha Constituency in Punjab

Coordinates: 30.9°N 75.9°E

Ludhiana PB-7
- Lok Sabha constituency
- Interactive Map Outlining Ludhiana Lok Sabha constituency

Constituency details
- Country: India
- State: Punjab
- Assembly constituencies: Ludhiana East; Ludhiana South; Atam Nagar; Ludhiana Central; Ludhiana West; Ludhiana North; Gill; Dakha; Jagraon
- Established: 1952
- Reservation: None

Member of Parliament
- 18th Lok Sabha
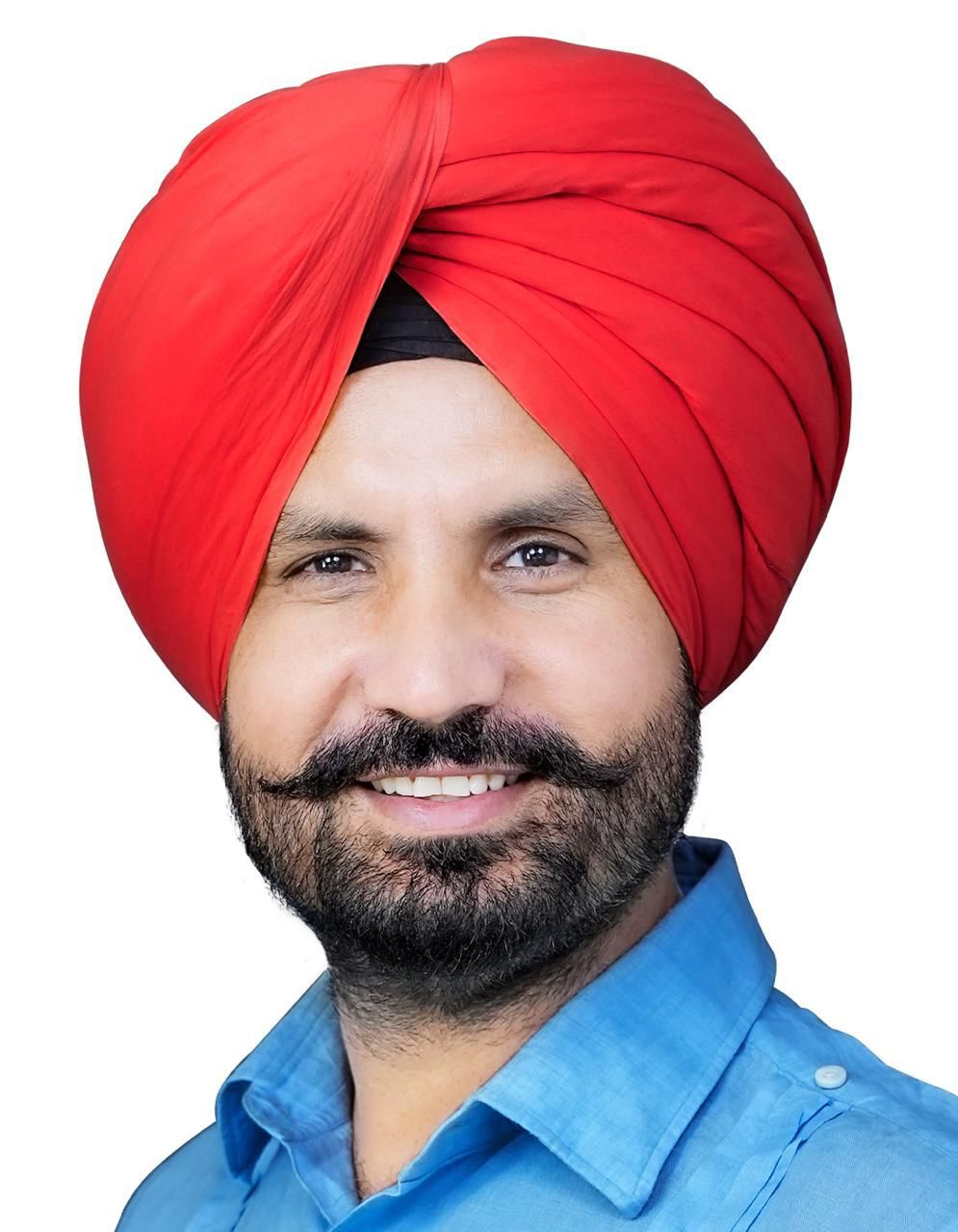
- Incumbent Amrinder Singh Raja Warring
- Party: INC
- Alliance: INDIA
- Elected year: 2024
- Preceded by: Ravneet Singh Bittu

Ludhiana Lok Sabha constituency (S. No. 7) is one of the 13 Lok Sabha (parliamentary) constituencies in Punjab, India. This Lok Sabha constituency is composed of 9 Punjab Legislative Assembly Constituencies from Ludhiana district, which are given further in the table. The incumbent MP is Amrinder Singh Raja Warring from Indian National Congress (INC), who won recently in 2024

== Punjab Legislative Assembly segments ==
#	Name	District	Member	Party	Leading (in 2024)
60	Ludhiana East	Ludhiana	Daljit Singh Grewal	AAP	BJP
61	Ludhiana South	Ludhiana	Rajinder Pal Kaur Chhina	AAP	BJP
62	Atam Nagar	Ludhiana	Kulwant Singh Sidhu	AAP	INC
63	Ludhiana Central	Ludhiana	Ashok Prashar Pappi	AAP	BJP
64	Ludhiana West	Ludhiana	Sanjeev Arora	AAP	BJP
65	Ludhiana North	Ludhiana	Madan Lal Bagga	AAP	BJP
66	Gill (SC)	Ludhiana	Jiwan Singh Sangowal	AAP	INC
68	Dakha	Ludhiana	Manpreet Singh Ayali	Independent	INC
70	Jagraon (SC)	Ludhiana	Saravjit Kaur Manuke	AAP	INC

== Members of Parliament ==
Most Successful parties from Ludhiana Lok Sabha
1. INC (11 Times) (57.9%)
2. SAD (5 Times) (26.3%)
3. Swatantra Party (1 Time) (5.26%)
4. INC (I) (1 Time) (5.26%)
5. SAD (A) (1 Time) (5.26%)

Year	Name	Party
1952	Bahadur Singh	Indian National Congress
1957	Bahadur Singh	Indian National Congress
1957^	Ajit Singh Sarhadi	Indian National Congress
1962	Kapur Singh	Swatantra Party
1967	Devinder Singh Garcha	Indian National Congress
1971	Devinder Singh Garcha	Indian National Congress
1977	Jagdev Singh Talwandi	Shiromani Akali Dal
1980	Devinder Singh Garcha	Indian National Congress
1984	Mewa Singh Gill	Shiromani Akali Dal
1989	Rajinder Kaur Bulara	Shiromani Akali Dal (A)
1992	Gurdial Singh	Indian National Congress
1996	Amrik Singh Aliwal	Shiromani Akali Dal
1998	Amrik Singh Aliwal	Shiromani Akali Dal
1999	Gurcharan Singh Galib	Indian National Congress
2004	Sharanjit Singh Dhillon	Shiromani Akali Dal
2009	Manish Tewari	Indian National Congress
2014	Ravneet Singh Bittu	Indian National Congress
2019	Ravneet Singh Bittu	Indian National Congress
2024	Amrinder Singh Raja Warring	Indian National Congress

== Election results ==
=== 2024 ===
2024 Indian general elections: Ludhiana
Party	Candidate	Votes	%	±%
INC	Amrinder Singh Raja Warring	322,224	30.42	▼6.24
BJP	Ravneet Singh Bittu	301,282	28.45	New entry
AAP	Ashok Prashar Pappi	237,077	22.38	▲20.86
SAD	Ranjit Singh Dhillon	90,220	8.52	▼20.08
NOTA	None of the above	5,076	0.48	▼0.53
Majority		20,942	1.98	▼5.32
Turnout		1,059,157		
INC hold		Swing	▼6.24	

=== 2019 ===
2019 Indian general elections: Ludhiana
Party	Candidate	Votes	%	±%
INC	Ravneet Singh Bittu	383,795	36.66	▲9.39
LIP	Simarjit Singh Bains	307,423	29.36	New
SAD	Maheshinder Singh	299,435	28.60	▲5.32
AAP	Prof. Tejpal Singh Gill	15,945	1.52	▼23.96
NOTA	None of the above	10,538	1.01	N/A
Majority		76,732	7.30	▲5.51
Turnout		1,047,025	62.20	▼8.38
INC hold		Swing		

=== 2014 ===
2014 Indian general elections: Ludhiana
Party	Candidate	Votes	%	±%
INC	Ravneet Singh Bittu	300,459	27.27	▼23.81
AAP	Harvinder Singh Phoolka	280,750	25.48	New
SAD	Manpreet Singh Ayali	256,590	23.28	▼16.37
IND	Simarjit Singh Bains	210,917	19.14	N/A
BSP	Navjot Singh Mandair	8,317	0.76	▼3.10
Majority		19,709	1.79	▼11.64
Turnout		1,101,967	70.58	▲5.90
INC hold		Swing	▼25.81	

=== 2009 ===
2009 Indian general elections: Ludhiana
Party	Candidate	Votes	%	±%
INC	Manish Tewari	449,264	53.08	
SAD	Gurcharan Singh Galib	335,558	39.65	
BSP	Kehar Singh	32,660	3.86	
IND.	Harbans Singh Sodhi	2,685	0.32	
DBSP	Sanjeev Kumar Atwal	2,564	0.30	
Majority		113,706	13.43	
Turnout		846,890	64.68	
INC gain from SAD		Swing		

=== 2004 ===
2004 Indian general election: Ludhiana
Party	Candidate	Votes	%	±%
SAD	Sharanjit Singh Dhillon	329,234	37.85	
INC	Manish Tewari	299,694	34.45	
LBP	Balwant Singh Ramoowalia	187,787	21.59	
BSP	Rabinder Singh Sohil	19,595	2.25	
Independent	11 Independent Candidates	28,293	3.25	
Others	3 Other Party Candidates	5,324	0.61	
Majority		29,540	3.40	
Turnout				
Swing to SAD from INC		Swing		

=== 1999 ===
1999 Indian general election: Ludhiana
Party	Candidate	Votes	%	±%
INC	Gurcharan Singh Galib	346,928	52.02	
SAD	Amrik Singh Aliwal	241,682	36.24	
SHSAD	Gurdarshan Singh Grewal	64,893	9.73	
Independent	Abdul Shakoor	3,369	0.51	
BSP (A)	Sardool Singh Gill	2,848	0.43	
Independent	Tarsem Singh	2,770	0.42	
Independent	Harbans Kaur	1,081	0.16	
RJD	Hira Jha	921	0.14	
Independent	Parmjit Singh	884	0.13	
NCP	Rashpal Singh Gill	708	0.11	
Independent	Naresh Jaggi	573	0.09	
Independent	Gurbaksh Singh	312	0.05	
Majority		105,246	15.78	
Turnout		674,419	45.83	
Swing to INC from SAD		Swing		

=== 1998 ===
1998 Indian general election: Ludhiana
Party	Candidate	Votes	%	±%
SAD	Amrik Singh Aliwal	370,115	49.71	
INC	Gurcharan Singh Galib	360,903	48.47	
BSP (A)	Sardool Singh	3,612	0.49	
CPI(ML)L	Jita Kaur	1,606	0.22	
Independent	7 Independent Candidates	5,317	0.71	
Others	3 Other Party Candidates	2,975	0.40	
Majority		9,212	1.24	
Turnout				
Swing to SAD from INC		Swing		

=== 1996 ===
1996 Indian general election: Ludhiana
Party	Candidate	Votes	%	±%
SAD	Amrik Singh Aliwal	356,157	45.60	
INC	Jaswant Kaur	284,907	36.48	
BJP	Satpal Gosain	93,683	11.99	
AIIC(T)	Kirpal Singh Kalsi	1,757	0.22	
CPI(ML)L	Rajinder Kumar Sharma	502	0.06	
RPI	Varinder Aggarwal	363	0.05	
Independent	30 Independent Candidates	43,682	5.60	
Majority		71,250	9.12	
Turnout				
Swing to SAD from INC		Swing		

=== 1992 ===
1992 Indian general election: Ludhiana
Party	Candidate	Votes	%	±%
INC	Gurcharan Singh Galib	108,811	56.16	
BJP	Krishan Kant Jain	55,363	28.57	
BSP	Pritpal Singh	18,733	9.67	
JD	Subhash Chander	5,969	3.08	
Independent	5 Independent Candidates	4,884	2.51	
Majority		53,448	27.59	
Turnout				
Swing to INC from BJP		Swing		

=== 1989 ===
1989 Indian general election: Ludhiana
Party	Candidate	Votes	%	±%
SAD(A)	Rajinder Kaur Bulara	357,349	53.48	
INC	Gurcharan Singh Galib	223,620	33.47	
BSP	Inderjit Singh	34,328	5.14	
SAD	Jagdev Singh Jassowal	25,258	3.78	
Independent	16 Independent Candidates	24,371	3.65	
Others	4 Other Party Candidates	3,281	0.49	
Majority		133,729	20.01	
Turnout				
Swing to SAD(A) from INC		Swing		

=== 1984 ===
1984: Ludhiana
Party	Candidate	Votes	%	±%
SAD	Mewa Singh	273,352	48.23	
INC	Joginder Pali Pandey	273212	48.20	
Independent	Naresh Kumar	12129	2.14	
Independent	Ajit Singh	6235	1.10	
Independent	Kaka Joginder Singh	1848	0.33	

"Statistical Report on General Elections, 1984 to the Eighth Lok Sabha". Election Commission of India.

== See also ==
- Ludhiana district
- List of constituencies of the Lok Sabha
