= Devinder Singh Garcha =

Indian politician (born 1932)

Member of Parliament, Lok Sabha
- In office 1967–1977
- Preceded by: Kapur Singh
- Succeeded by: Jagdev Singh Talwandi
- In office 1980–1984
- Preceded by: Jagdev Singh Talwandi
- Succeeded by: Sharanjit Singh Dhillon
- Constituency: Ludhiana, Punjab

Personal details
- Born: 23 April 1932 Dhandari Khurd, Ludhiana district, Punjab, British India
- Party: Indian National Congress
- Spouse: Jasbir Kaur

Devinder Singh Garcha (born 23 April 1932) is an Indian politician. He was elected to the Lok Sabha, the lower house of the Parliament of India as a member of the Indian National Congress.
