= Kubba, Punjab =

Village in Punjab, India

Coordinates: 30°50′09″N 76°05′27″E

Kubba village is located in the Samrala tehsil of Ludhiana district in the Indian state of Punjab. It is 10 km away from the district headquarters in Ludhiana. Kubba village is also a Gram Panchayat. Its population is 1,157 people, of which the male population is 590 and the female population is 567.

Kubba village's Pincode is 141418.
