= Gharkhana =

- village
- Location in Punjab, India
- Coordinates: 30°48′14.603″N 76°13′44.696″E
- Country: India
- State: Punjab
- District: Ludhiana

Languages
  - Official: Punjabi
- Time zone: UTC+5:30 (IST)
- PIN: 141114

Gharkhana is a village in Samrala tehsil, Ludhiana district, Punjab, India. It is located 36 km East of district headquarters Ludhiana and 66 km from the state capital Chandigarh. Other nearby cities include Khanna, Morinda and Nawanshahr.

The local language is Punjabi.

Schools near Gharkhana include:

- Mata Gurdev Kaur Memorial Shahi Sports College of Physical Education
- Punjab Public School
- Aarti Memorial Public School
- Kinder Garden Senior Secondary School
- Usha Devi Public School
