= Sanjeev Talwar =

Indian politician from Punjab

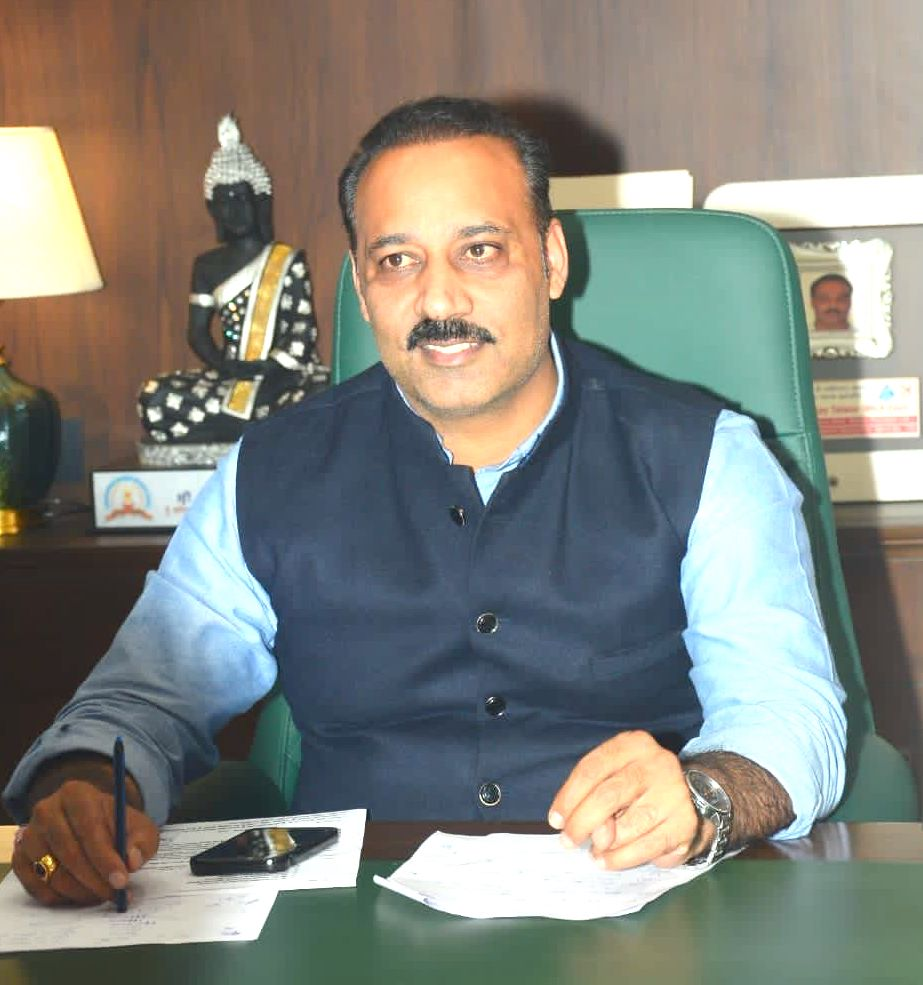

Member of the Punjab Legislative Assembly
- In office 11 March 2017 – 11 March 2022
- Preceded by: Ranjit Singh Dhillon
- Succeeded by: Daljit Singh Grewal
- Constituency: Ludhiana East

Municipal Sub Councillor
- In office 2002–2017

Personal details
- Born: 23 January 1972 (age 54) Ludhiana, Punjab, India
- Party: Indian National Congress

Sanjeev Talwar (Sanjay Talwar) (born January 23, 1972) is an Indian National Congress politician from Punjab. Currently, he represents the Ludhiana East.

== Political career ==
Talwar started his political career when he was 30 years old and he was elected as a Municipal Councillor in the year 2002 from ward number 39, Ludhiana (later ward number 54). Subsequently, he was elected as a municipal councillor for consecutive 3 terms 2002–2007, 2007–2012, 2012–2017 in the same ward which falls under Ludhiana Central Constituency. Acknowledging his development works and connection with people, Indian National Congress in the year 2017, allotted him a ticket for the Ludhiana east constituency with just 12 days remaining for polls. As a first-time MLA, Talwar is renowned for his significant contributions in the field of education which includes setting up a new government college in his constituency, the demand for which was pending from 78 years and development of 11 new government smart schools in his constituency.
