= Ludhiana East Assembly constituency =

Legislative Assembly constituency in Punjab State, India

Coordinates: 30.92°N 75.89°E

Ludhiana East
- Constituency No. 60 for the Punjab Legislative Assembly

Constituency details
- Country: India
- State: Punjab
- District: Ludhiana
- Lok Sabha constituency: Ludhiana
- Total electors: 217,819
- Reservation: None

Member of Legislative Assembly
- 16th Punjab Legislative Assembly
- Incumbent Daljit Singh Grewal
- Party: Aam Aadmi Party
- Elected year: 2022

Ludhiana East is one of the 117 Legislative Assembly constituencies of Punjab state in India. It is part of Ludhiana district.

== Members of the Legislative Assembly ==
Most Successful parties from Ludhiana East Assembly Constituency
1. INC (5 Times) (50.0%)
2. BJP (3 Times) (30.0%)
3. SAD (1 Time) (10.0%)
4. AAP (1 Time) (10.0%)

Year	Member	Party
1952-1977 : Constituency did not exist
1977	Om Parkash Gupta	Indian National Congress
1980	Om Parkash Gupta	Indian National Congress
1985	Om Parkash Gupta	Indian National Congress
1992	Satpal Gosain	Bharatiya Janata Party
1997	Satpal Gosain	Bharatiya Janata Party
2002	Surinder Kumar Dawar	Indian National Congress
2007	Satpal Gosain	Bharatiya Janata Party
2012	Ranjit Singh Dhillon	Shiromani Akali Dal
2017	Sanjeev Talwar	Indian National Congress
2022	Daljit Singh Grewal	Aam Aadmi Party

== Election results ==
=== 2027 ===
Punjab Assembly election, 2027: Ludhiana East
Party	Candidate	Votes	%	±%
AAP	Daljit Singh Grewal			
AD (WPD)				New entry
INC				
BSP				
SAD				
BJP				
NOTA	None of the above			
Majority				
Turnout				

=== 2022 ===
Punjab Assembly election, 2022: Ludhiana East
Party	Candidate	Votes	%	±%
AAP	Daljit Singh Grewal	68,682	47.54	▲15.74
INC	Sanjeev Talwar	32,760	22.67	▼10.36
SAD	Ranjit Singh Dhillon	20,369	14.10	▼17.60
BJP	Jagmohan Sharma	18,074	12.51	New
SAD(A)	Jaswant Singh Cheema	1,795	1.24	▲0.74
NOTA	None of the above	809	0.56	▼0.24
Majority		35,922	24.87	
Turnout		144,481		
Registered electors		217,819		
AAP gain from INC		Swing		

=== 2017 ===
Punjab Assembly election, 2017: Ludhiana East
Party	Candidate	Votes	%	±%
INC	Sanjeev Talwar	43,010	33.03%	▲2.05
AAP	Daljit Singh Grewal	41,429	31.8%	new
SAD	Ranjit Singh Dhillon	41,313	31.7%	▼3.51
BSP	Gurpreet Singh	2,076	1.5%	▼6.88
SAD(A)	Jaswant Singh Cheema	659	0.5%	
NOTA	None of the above	1,067	0.8%	
Majority		1,581	1.2	
Turnout		130,213		
Registered electors		182,228		
INC gain from SAD		Swing		

=== 2012 ===
Punjab Assembly election, 2012: Ludhiana East
Party	Candidate	Votes	%	±%
SAD	Ranjit Singh Dhillon	38,157	35.5	
INC	Gurmail Singh Pehalwan	33,586	31.25	
Independent	Daljit Singh Grewal	22,412	20.85	
BSP	Ramanjit Lally	9124	8.49	
Majority		4571	4.25	
Turnout		1,07,487		
Registered electors		149,607		
SAD gain from BJP		Swing		

== See also ==
- List of constituencies of the Punjab Legislative Assembly
- Ludhiana district
