= Amrik Singh Aliwal =

Indian politician

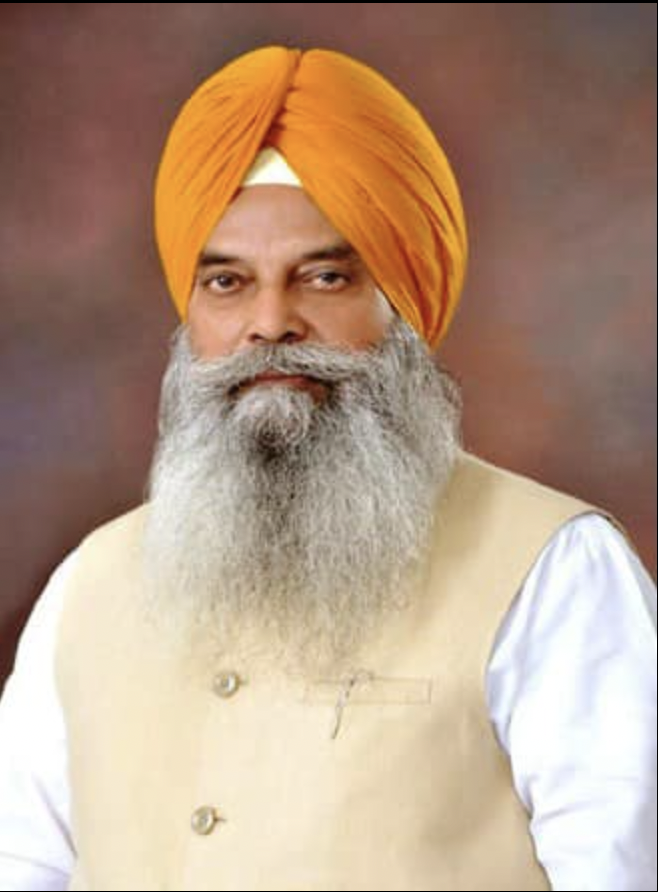

Member of Parliament, Lok Sabha
- In office 1996-1999
- Preceded by: Rajinder Kaur Bulara
- Succeeded by: Gurcharan Singh Galib
- Constituency: Ludhiana, Punjab

Personal details
- Born: 15 January 1958 (age 68) Lohian Khass, Jalandhar District, Punjab, India
- Party: Bharatiya Janata Party
- Other party: Punjab Lok Congress; Indian National Congress; Shiromani Akali Dal
- Spouse: Balwinder Kaur

Amrik Singh Aliwal is a grassroots Indian politician who started his political innings as the Sarpanch of Village Aliwal which falls in District Ludhiana. He was imprisoned for six months in 1994 for an agitation regarding the democratic rights of the people. He was elected to the Lok Sabha, the lower house of the Parliament of India as a member of the Shiromani Akali Dal and remained the Lok Sabha member from Ludhiana for two terms. On 14 December 2021, he joined the Punjab Lok Congress.
