= Krishan Kant =

Vice President of India from 1997 to 2002

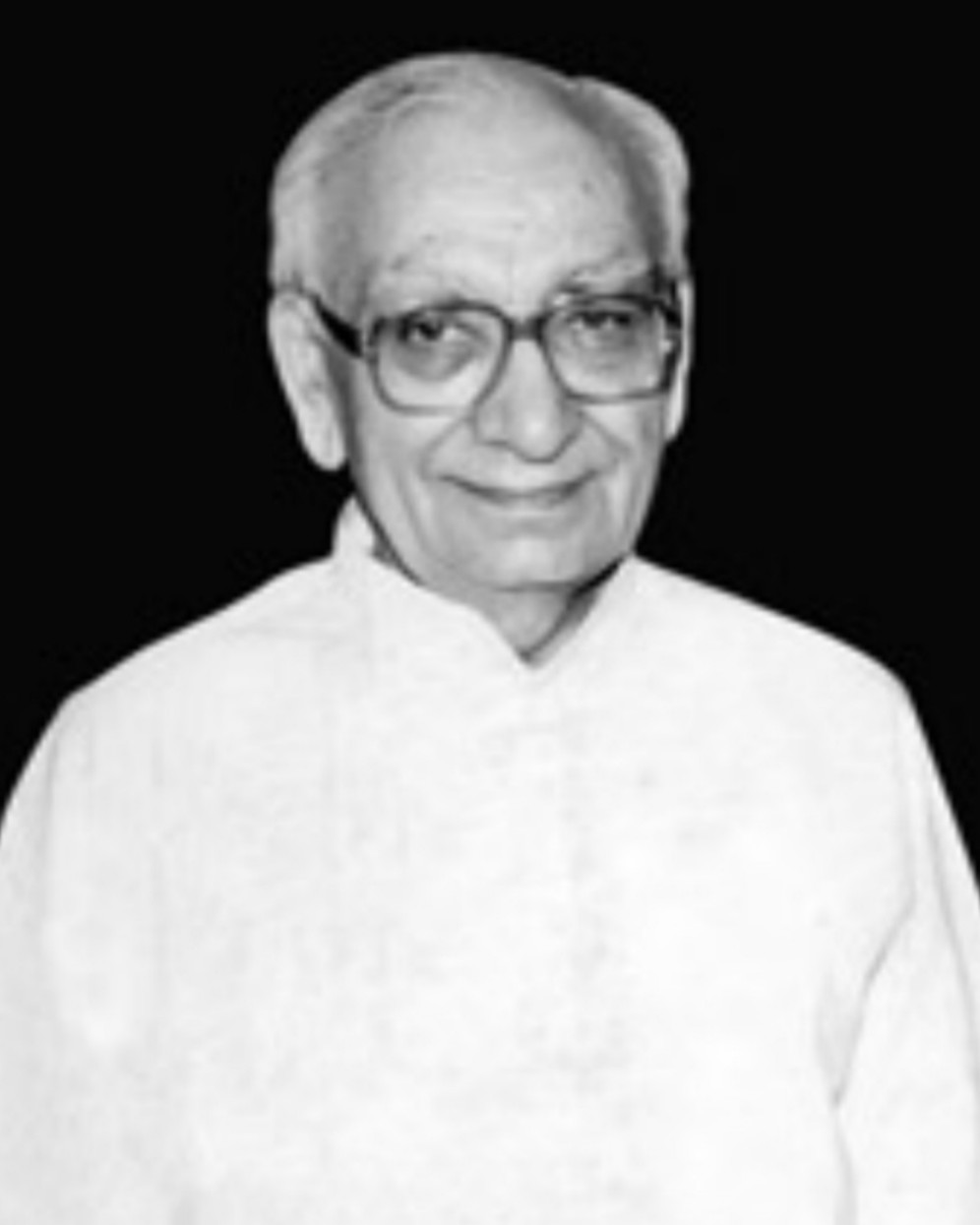
- Official portrait, 1997

Vice President of India
- In office 21 August 1997 – 27 July 2002
- President: K. R. Narayanan; A. P. J. Abdul Kalam
- Prime Minister: Inder Kumar Gujral; Atal Bihari Vajpayee
- Preceded by: K. R. Narayanan
- Succeeded by: Bhairon Singh Shekhawat

Governor of Tamil Nadu
- Additional Charge
- In office 22 December 1996 – 25 January 1997
- Chief Minister: Muthuvel Karunanidhi
- Preceded by: Marri Chenna Reddy
- Succeeded by: Fatima Beevi

Governor of Andhra Pradesh
- In office 7 February 1990 – 21 August 1997
- Chief Minister: Marri Chenna Reddy; Nedurumalli Janardhana Reddy; Kotla Vijaya Bhaskara Reddy; Nandamuri Taraka Rama Rao; Nara Chandrababu Naidu
- Preceded by: Kumudben Manishankar Joshi
- Succeeded by: C Rangarajan

Member of Parliament, Lok Sabha
- In office 1977–1980
- Preceded by: Amarnath Vidyalankar
- Succeeded by: Jagannath Kaushal
- Constituency: Chandigarh

Member of Parliament, Rajya Sabha
- In office 1966–1977
- Constituency: Haryana

Personal details
- Born: 28 February 1927 Kot Mohammad Khan, Punjab Province, British India
- Died: 27 July 2002 (aged 75) New Delhi, Delhi, India
- Party: Janata Dal (1988–2002)
- Other political affiliations: Indian National Congress (Before 1977); Janata Party (1977–1988)
- Spouse: Suman Kant
- Children: Divya Deepti Handa (daughter); Rashmi Kant (daughter); Sukant Kohli (son)
- Parent(s): Achint Ram; Satyavati Devi
- Education: Indian Institute of Technology (BHU), Varanasi
- Profession: Scientist
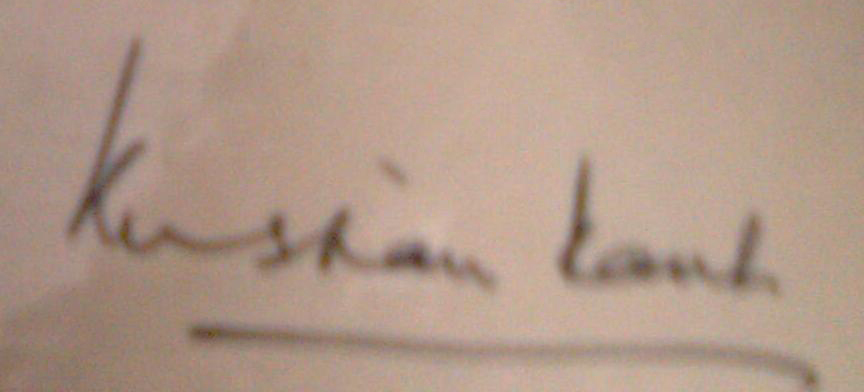
- Signature

Krishan Kant (28 February 1927 – 27 July 2002) was an Indian politician who served as the vice president of India from 1997 until his death in 2002. Prior to his vice presidency, Kant was the governor of Andhra Pradesh from 1990 to 1997. He was a member of both houses of the Indian Parliament, representing Haryana in the Rajya Sabha from 1966 to 1977, and Chandigarh in the Lok Sabha from 1977 to 1980.

Kant was born to parents who were independence activists in Punjab, British India, and was himself arrested in Lahore during the Quit India movement. After independence, he studied chemical engineering and briefly worked as a scientist with the Council of Scientific and Industrial Research, New Delhi, before turning to politics.

Kant was initially associated with the Congress, but later joined the Janata Party and the Janata Dal. He was considered as a candidate for the 2002 presidential election, as was routine for vice presidents. However, the government and the opposition supported A. P. J. Abdul Kalam as the candidate. Kalam took oath as president two days prior to Kant's death. He remains the only Indian vice president to have died in office.

== Early life ==
Kant was born on 28 February 1927 in Kot Mohammad Khan, Amritsar district, Punjab province to independence activists, Lala Achint Ram and Satyavati Devi. Both of Kant's parents were imprisoned by the British colonial government on various occasions for their involvement in independence activism, including alongside Kant (aged 16) and his siblings in 1942. Post-independence, Lala Achint Ram was a member of the Constituent Assembly of India and represented Hisar and Patiala in the Lok Sabha. Satyavati Devi outlived her son and died in 2010 as India's oldest surviving independence activist.

Kant studied chemical engineering at Institute of Technology, Banaras Hindu University. He later worked as a scientist with the Council of Scientific and Industrial Research, New Delhi.

Kant was married to Suman Kant, a social worker and an activist. The couple had two sons and a daughter.

== Political career ==
Kant had been jailed during the Quit India movement at the age of 16, alongside his parents.

After the independence of India, Kant joined the ruling Congress party, where formed a group focused on promoting science, and was a member of the All India Congress Committee. He was also involved in the Bhoodan movement in Punjab.

In 1966, Kant was elected to the Rajya Sabha, the upper house of the Indian Parliament, representing the state of Haryana. He was re-elected in 1972. He chaired the parliamentary committee on railway reservations and bookings from 1972 to 1977. He was a socialist and belonged to a more left-wing faction of the Congress party. Despite belonging to her Congress party, he opposed Indira Gandhi's decision to impose the Emergency, supported opposition leader Jayaprakash Narayan and his anti-corruption campaign. He was expelled from the Congress in 1975, for organising a public event opposing the Emergency, and was jailed for 19 months between 1975 and 1977.

He subsequently joined the Janata Party and contested the Chandigarh Lok Sabha constituency in 1977. He was elected with 66.13% of the vote, defeating Congress' Sat Pal. In 1980 general election, Kant lost his seat to Congress' Jagannath Kaushal, and was placed third with 9.30% of the vote, behind Kaushal and independent candidate Ram Swarup.

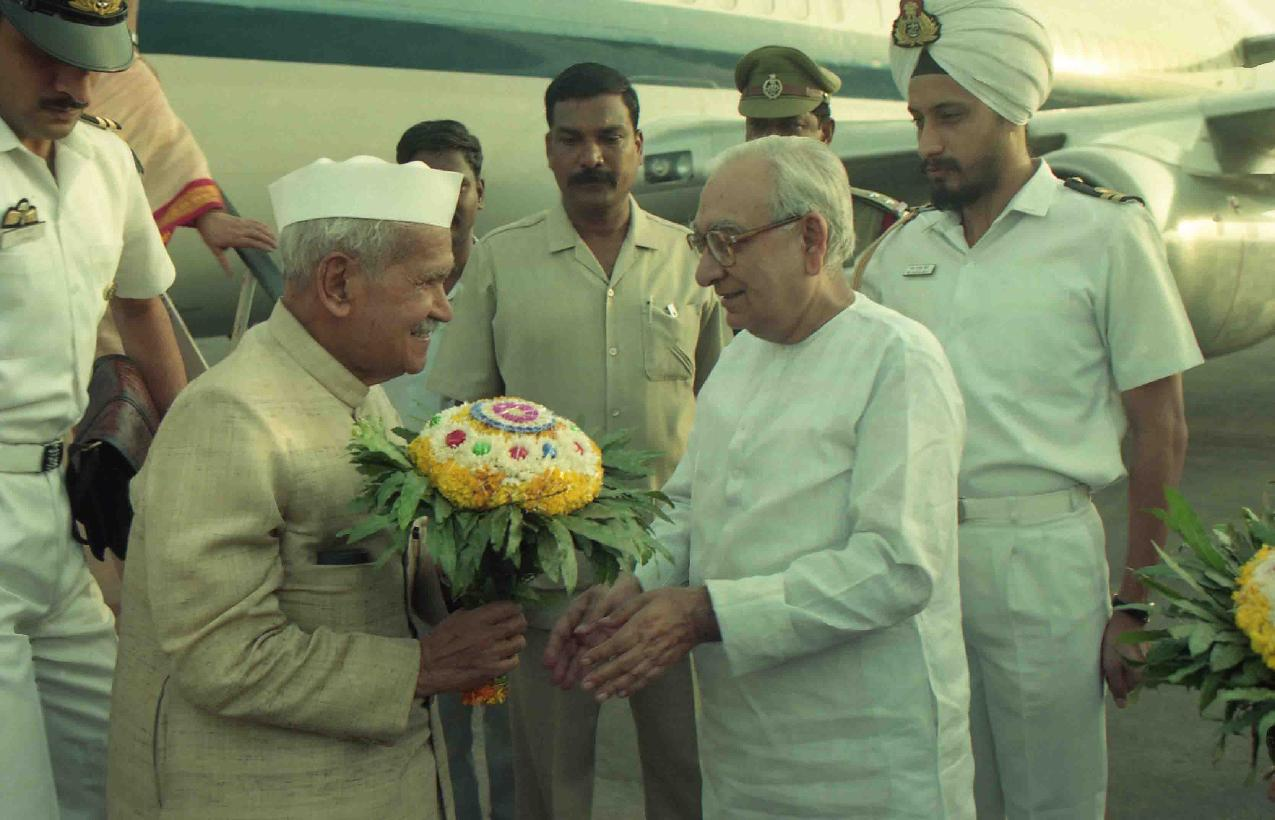
The President of India, Shankar Dayal Sharma being received by the Governor of Andhra Pradesh, Krishan Kant, at Renigunta airport

Krishan Kant was the founding general secretary of the People's Union for Civil Liberties in 1976. He also was a member of the executive council of the Institute of Defence Studies and Analysis.

He with Madhu Limaye was also responsible for the collapse of the Morarji Desai government installed by that coalition, by insisting that no member of the Janata Party could be the member of Rashtriya Swayamsevak Sangh (RSS). This attack on dual membership was directed specifically at members of the Janata Party who had been members of the Jan Sangh, and continued to be members of the right-wing RSS, the Jan Sangh's ideological parent. The issue led to fall of Morarji Desai government in 1979, and the destruction of the Janata coalition.

In 1990, Kant was appointed governor of Andhra Pradesh by President R. Venkataraman, on advice of the V. P. Singh government. He served in the gubernatorial office for seven years. From December 1996 to January 1997, he acted as the governor of Tamil Nadu, after the incumbent governor Marri Chenna Reddy died in office.

== Vice President of India (1997–2002) ==
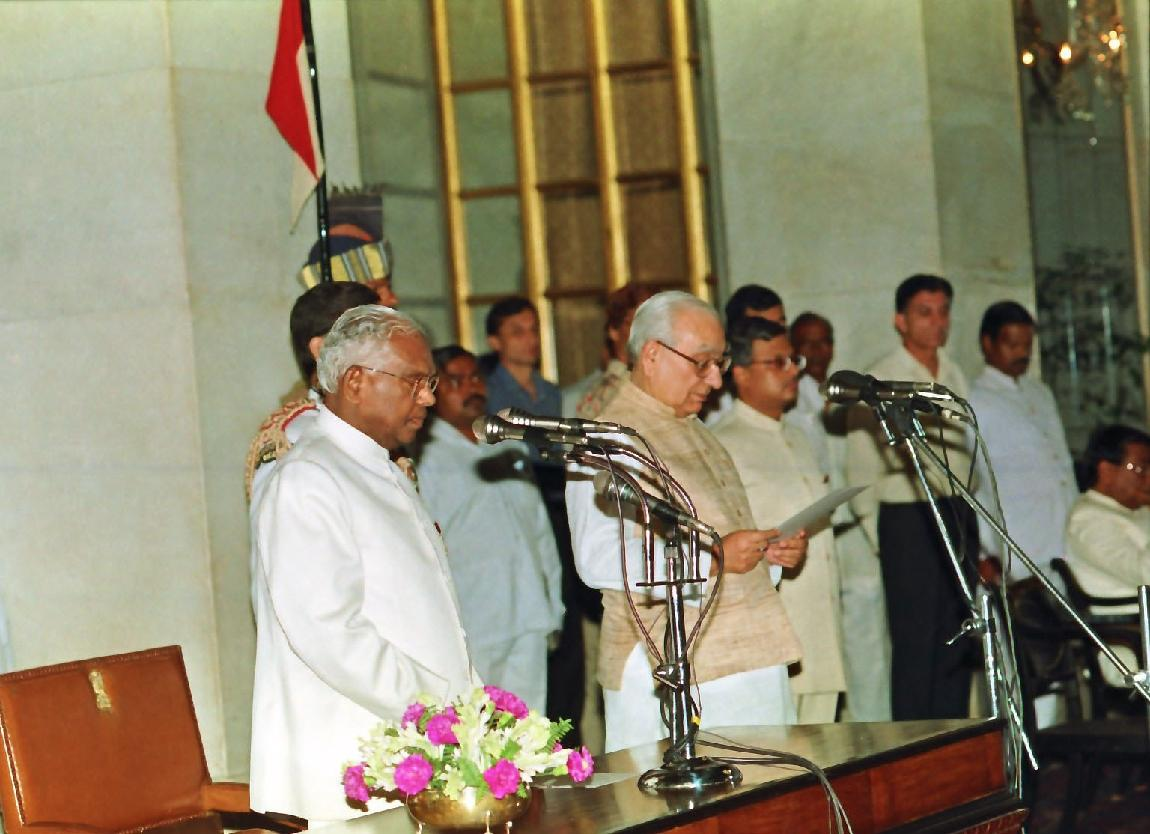
Swearing-in-Ceremony of the Vice President of India, Shri Krishan Kant at the Ashok Hall of Rashtrapati Bhavan

In 1997, Kant was jointly selected as the candidate for the vice presidential election by Indian National Congress and United Front. He defeated former Punjab chief minister Surjit Singh Barnala to become India's tenth vice president.

During the terrorist attack on the Indian Parliament in 2001, the terrorists crashed their vehicle into Kant's car before commencing the attack. Kant himself was unhurt during the attack.

=== 2002 Presidential election ===
He was considered as a potential presidential candidate prior to the 2002 election. However, the government and the opposition jointly nominated aerospace scientist A. P. J. Abdul Kalam instead. Kalam was eventually elected and took oath of office two days prior to Kant's death.

== Death ==
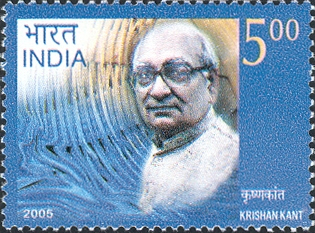
A 2005 India Post stamp featuring Kant

On 27 July 2002, Kant was admitted to AIIMS, New Delhi and was declared dead after an hour, after suffering a heart attack. He was aged 75. Till date, he remains the only Indian vice president to have died in office.

Prime minister Vajpayee noted Kant's contribution to the independence movement and his opposition to the Emergency and termed his death the "end of an era". He further declared three days of national mourning. Pakistani president Musharraf sent a letter of condolence to Indian president A. P. J. Abdul Kalam.

Kant was cremated in a state funeral at Nigambodh Ghat, New Delhi, on the banks of Yamuna river on 28 July 2002. His funeral was attended by president Kalam, prime minister Vajpayee, deputy prime minister Advani, and opposition leader Sonia Gandhi.

He was survived by his wife, two sons, and a daughter as well as grandchildren and great-grandchildren along with his mother, Satyavati Devi, who outlived him by eight years.

Two weeks after Kant's death, an election was held to elect his successor. Former Rajasthan chief minister Bhairon Singh Shekhawat was elected vice president.

A park in Hyderabad was named after Kant to commemorate his tenure as governor of Andhra Pradesh.

Political offices
Preceded by Kumudben Manishankar Joshi	Governor of Andhra Pradesh; 1990–1997	Succeeded by G. Ramanujam
Preceded by Marri Chenna Reddy	Governor of Tamil Nadu; 1996–1997	Succeeded by Fatima Beevi
Preceded by K. R. Narayanan	Vice-President of India; 1997–2002	Succeeded by Bhairon Singh Shekhawat
