= Hans Jenny =

Hans Jenny may refer to:

- Hans Jenny (pedologist) (1899–1992), soil scientist
- Hans Jenny (cymatics) (1904–1972), father of cymatics, the study of wave phenomena

== See also ==
- Hans (disambiguation)
- Jenny (disambiguation)
