= Amarnath Vidyalankar =

Indian politician and social worker (1902–1985)

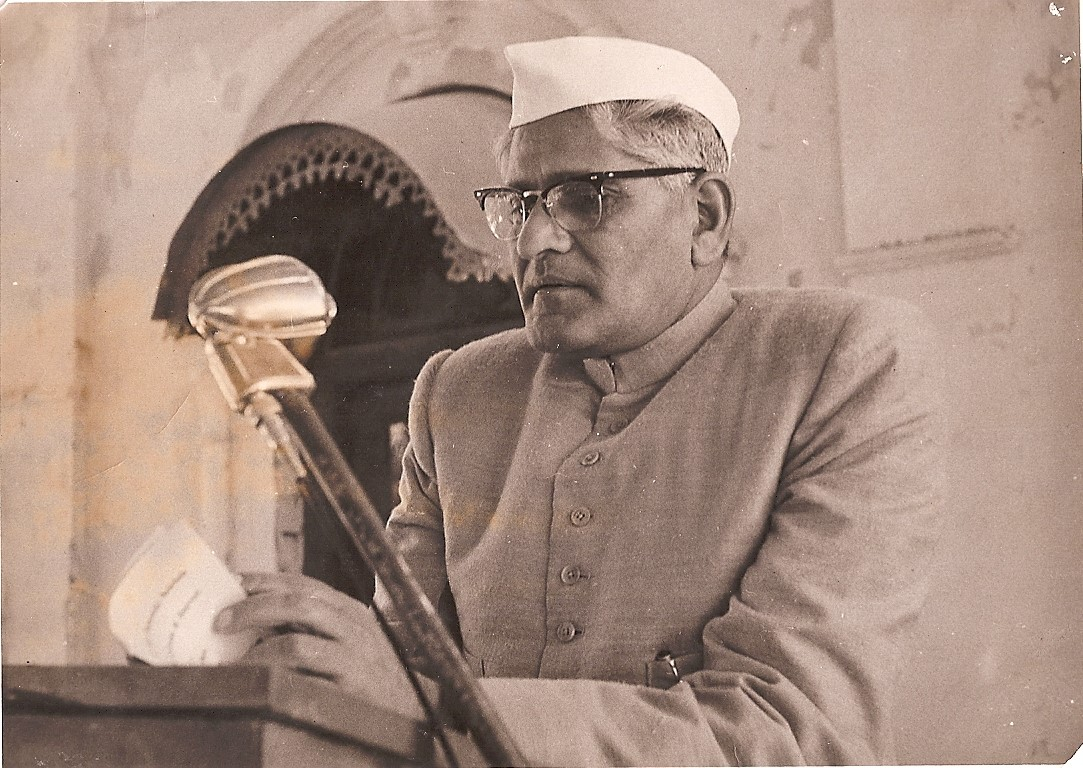

Member of Parliament, Lok Sabha
- In office 15 March 1971 – 18 January 1977
- In office 15 April 1952 – 3 March 1967

Personal details
- Born: 8 December 1902 Bhera, Punjab, India
- Died: 21 September 1985 (aged 83) New Delhi, India
- Party: Indian National Congress
- Spouse: Shanta Devi
- Relations: Ro Khanna (grandson)
- Education: Gurukul Kangri Vishwavidyalaya

Amarnath Vidyalankar (8 December 1902 – 21 September 1985) was an Indian politician, social worker and journalist. He was involved in the independence movement and became a member of the Indian National Congress before India's independence in 1947. After independence, Vidyalankar served as Minister of Education, Labor and Languages in the Government of Punjab from 1957 to 1962 and was a member of the First (1952–1956), Third (1962–1967) and Fifth (1971–1977) Lok Sabhas.

== Early life ==
Vidylankar was born in Bhera, Shahpur District (now Sargodha District), in pre-partition India on 8 December 1902. He was the son of Aruri Mal.

Vidyalankar was educated at Gurukul Kangri Vishwavidyalaya.

== Political career ==
After Vidyalankar completed his education, he plunged himself into the non-cooperation movement.

Vidyalankar served as personal secretary of Lala Lajpat Rai from December 1926 until his death. He worked among Harijans through Achhut Uddhar Mandal and Harijans Seva Sangh between 1933 and 1940. He was also a life member of Servants of the Peoples Society where he organized kissan schools and study circles.

Lala Lajpat Rai gave Vidyalankar the job of teaching history at Lahore National College, where Bhagat singh and his associates were his students. After the closure of National College, Lala Lajpat Rai sent him to Hisar to assist famine victims in remote areas. In Haryana he worked in the labour movement, and in 1931 was sentenced to two years in jail for his editorial on the failure of the Round Table Conferences. He was also imprisoned for 2 years during Quit India movement. During the communal clashes in 1947, he organized rescue squads for people.

Vidyalankar was appointed by Rajendra Prasad (later the first President of India) as permanent secretary in the All India Congress Committee (AICC) office in Delhi. After a little more than a year, Vallabhbhai Patel asked him to run for the Punjab Assembly. Winning the seat by a large margin, Vidyalankar resigned as AICC permanent secretary.

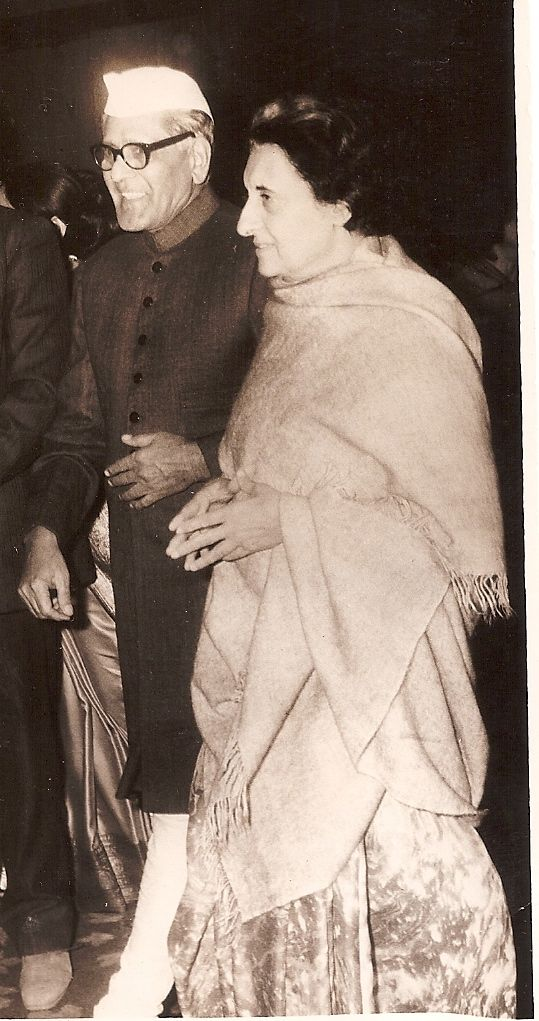
Vidyalankar with Prime Minister Indira Gandhi, 1975

He served as president of the Punjab branch of the Indian National Trade Union Congress, leader of the Indian delegation to International Labour Organisation, leader of goodwill delegation to Yugoslavia, Afghanistan. He was also the director of National Mineral Development Corporation.

In 1951 he stood in the first Indian parliamentary election as the Indian National Congress candidate from Jullundur against Shiromani Akali Dal candidate Ajit Singh Sarhaddi, winning by a wide margin. In 1956 Vidyalankar won the Punjab Legislative Assembly from Jagadhri, and was asked to serve as a minister. From 1957 to 1962, he was Minister of Education, Labor and Languages and Health for the State of Punjab under Chief Minister Pratap Singh Kairon.

He was a proponent of socialism and opined that that Congress must be turned into a cadre-based party in order to achieve socialism.

In 1962, he won the parliamentary election from Hoshiarpur.

In 1971, Vidyalankar stood for parliament from Chandigarh and was elected for a third time. During this period, he chaired three parliamentary committees appointed by the government: committees to study and improve the Information and Broadcasting Department and the Department of Supply and Disposal and a committee to study the national library in Calcutta. Vidyalankar was a member of the Public Accounts Committee, the Estimates Committee and the Committee on Public Undertakings.

He was a member of AICC Bangladesh committee set up in 1971 to maximize the relief efforts for the refugees from Bangladesh.

On 23 July 1975, he voted in support of the proclamation of emergency in India.

In 1977, he decided not to continue in the legislature. Vidyalankar was active in the Indian National Congress until his death in 1985.

== Writings ==
During his imprisonment during the 1930s and 1940s, Vidyalankar led worker study circles on political, social and economic subjects. He believed that workers should develop an Indian national feeling, regarding every Indian (regardless of caste, creed, language or ethnicity) as a brother. While he was in jail, he wrote four books in Hindi (Aaj Ki Duniya, Aaj Ka Manav Sansar, Bharat Ka Naya Itihas and Manav Sangharsh) and one in English (Evolution and Progress of the Human Race). Vidyalankar later wrote National Integration and the Teaching of History.
