= Mewa Singh Gill =

Indian politician

Member of Parliament, Lok Sabha
- In office 1984–1989
- Preceded by: Devinder Singh Garcha
- Succeeded by: Rajinder Kaur Bulara
- Constituency: Ludhiana

Personal details
- Party: Shiromani Akali Dal

Mewa Singh Gill is an Indian politician. He was elected to the Lok Sabha, lower house of the Parliament of India as a member of the Shiromani Akali Dal.
