= Gurcharan Singh Galib =

Indian politician

Member of Parliament, Lok Sabha
- In office 1999-2004
- Preceded by: Amrik Singh Aliwal
- Succeeded by: Sharanjit Singh Dhillon
- Constituency: Ludhiana, Punjab

Personal details
- Born: 1 December 1933 Galib, Ludhiana district, Punjab, British India
- Died: 2014
- Party: Indian National Congress
- Other party: Shiromani Akali Dal
- Spouse: Amarjeet Kaur Galib

Gurcharan Singh Galib was an Indian politician. He was elected to the Lok Sabha, the lower house of the Parliament of India as a member of the Indian National Congress.
