= Sharanjit Singh Dhillon =

Indian politician

Sharanjit Singh Dhillion

MLA, Punjab
- In office 2012–2022
- Succeeded by: Hardeep Singh Mundian
- Constituency: Sahewal

Member of Lok Sabha
- In office 2004–2009
- Preceded by: Gurcharan Singh Galib
- Succeeded by: Manish Tiwari
- Constituency: Ludhiana

Personal details
- Born: 18 April 1953 (age 73) Bhagpur, Ludhiana, Punjab
- Party: Shiromani Akali Dal
- Spouse: Pawanjeet Kaur (m. 1982)
- Children: 2, including Simranjeet Singh Dhillon
- Profession: Politician
- As of 27 June, 2010

Sharanjit Singh Dhillion (born 18 April 1953) is a member of the Punjab Legislative Assembly. He represents the Sahnewal, Ludhiana constituency of Punjab and was irrigation minister in ruling SAD-BJP government of Punjab from 2012 to 2017.

== Personal life ==
Dhillon was born to Mohinder Singh and Jaswant Kaur on 18 April 1953 in Bhagpur village of Ludhiana district in Punjab. He received his Bachelor of Arts and Bachelor of Laws degree educated at Panjab University, Chandigarh and Punjabi University, Patiala. Dhillon married Pawandeep Kaur on 31 January 1982, with whom he has a son and a daughter.

== Corruption charges (Irrigation Department Scam) ==
Dhillon is a key figure in the large-scale irrigation scam involving alleged quid-pro-quo tenders worth ₹1,000–1,200 crore. He faces serious corruption allegations based on contractor confessions and is actively under investigation by the Punjab Vigilance Bureau, though the case has yet to reach a judicial conclusion.

An FIR under the Prevention of Corruption Act was filed against Dhillon in August 2017 in Mohali, during the first year of the Congress government following SAD–BJP’s tenure. In September 2022, the Punjab government issued Lookout Circulars (LOCs) against Dhillon, the other minister, and the involved IAS officers to prevent them from leaving the country. Beginning in late November and December 2022, the Punjab Vigilance Bureau (VB) repeatedly summoned Dhillon along with the bureaucrats for questioning. Some failed to appear, citing health reasons or being abroad.

In February 2023, Dhillon and others were called again to present bank and property documents; he and former irrigation secretary Kahan Singh Pannu were questioned.
