= Ajit Singh Sarhadi =

Indian politician

Member of Parliament, Lok Sabha
- In office 1957–1962
- Preceded by: Bahadur Singh
- Succeeded by: Kapur Singh
- Constituency: Ludhiana

Personal details
- Born: May 19, 1905 Kohat, North-West Frontier Province, British India (now in Khyber Pakhtunkhwa, Pakistan)
- Died: 11 January 1979
- Party: Indian National Congress
- Spouse: Sarla Devi

Ajit Singh Sarhadi (1905–1979) was an Indian politician. He was elected to the Lok Sabha, lower house of the Parliament of India as a member of the Indian National Congress.
