= Rajinder Kaur Bulara =

Indian politician

Member of Parliament for Ludhiana
- In office 1989–1991
- Preceded by: Mewa Singh Gill
- Succeeded by: Gurdial Singh
- Constituency: Ludhiana

Personal details
- Born: 1946 (age 79–80) Raja Jang, Punjab, British India
- Party: Shiromani Akali Dal (Amritsar)
- Spouse: Rajinder Pal Singh Gill (m. 1967; died 1989)
- Children: Two children
- Education: Dev Samaj College for Women (Firozpur) (BA)

Rajinder Kaur Bulara (born 1946) is a politician of Shiromani Akali Dal (Amritsar) and a former member of the 9th Lok Sabha from Ludhiana.

== Early life ==
Rajinder Kaur was born at Raja Jung, Lahore district of undivided India on 10 June 1946 to Sardar Harsa Singh Sandhu and his wife. She attended the Dev Samaj College for Women at Firozpur and holds bachelor's degrees in Arts and Education.

== Personal life ==
Rajinder married Sardar Rajinder Pal Singh Gill on 17 November 1967. A professor of the Punjab Agricultural University, he was killed in a fake police encounter for allegedly being a militant. She has two children from him.

== Career ==
Kaur participated in the relief work following the 1984 anti-Sikh riots. She was the official candidate of Shiromani Akali Dal (Mann) from Ludhiana during the 1989 Indian general election. She defeated Gurcharan Singh Galib of the Indian National Congress by a margin of 1,33,729 votes and was elected to the 9th Lok Sabha. As a Member of Parliament, she was a member of the Consultative Committee for the Ministry of Industry. She contested the 2002 Punjab Legislative Assembly election from Ludhiana West but could secure only 3.30% of the total votes polled.

1989 Indian general election: Ludhiana
Party	Candidate	Votes	%	±%
SAD(A)	Rajinder Kaur Bulara	357,349	53.48	
INC	Gurcharan Singh Galib	223,620	33.47	
BSP	Inderjit Singh	34,328	5.14	
SAD	Jagdev Singh Jassowal	25,258	3.78	
Independent	16 Independent Candidates	24,371	3.65	
Others	4 Other Party Candidates	3,281	0.49	
Majority		133,729	20.01	
Turnout				
Swing to SAD(A) from INC		Swing		
