= Satyavati Devi (born 1905) =

Indian freedom fighter

Satyawati Devi
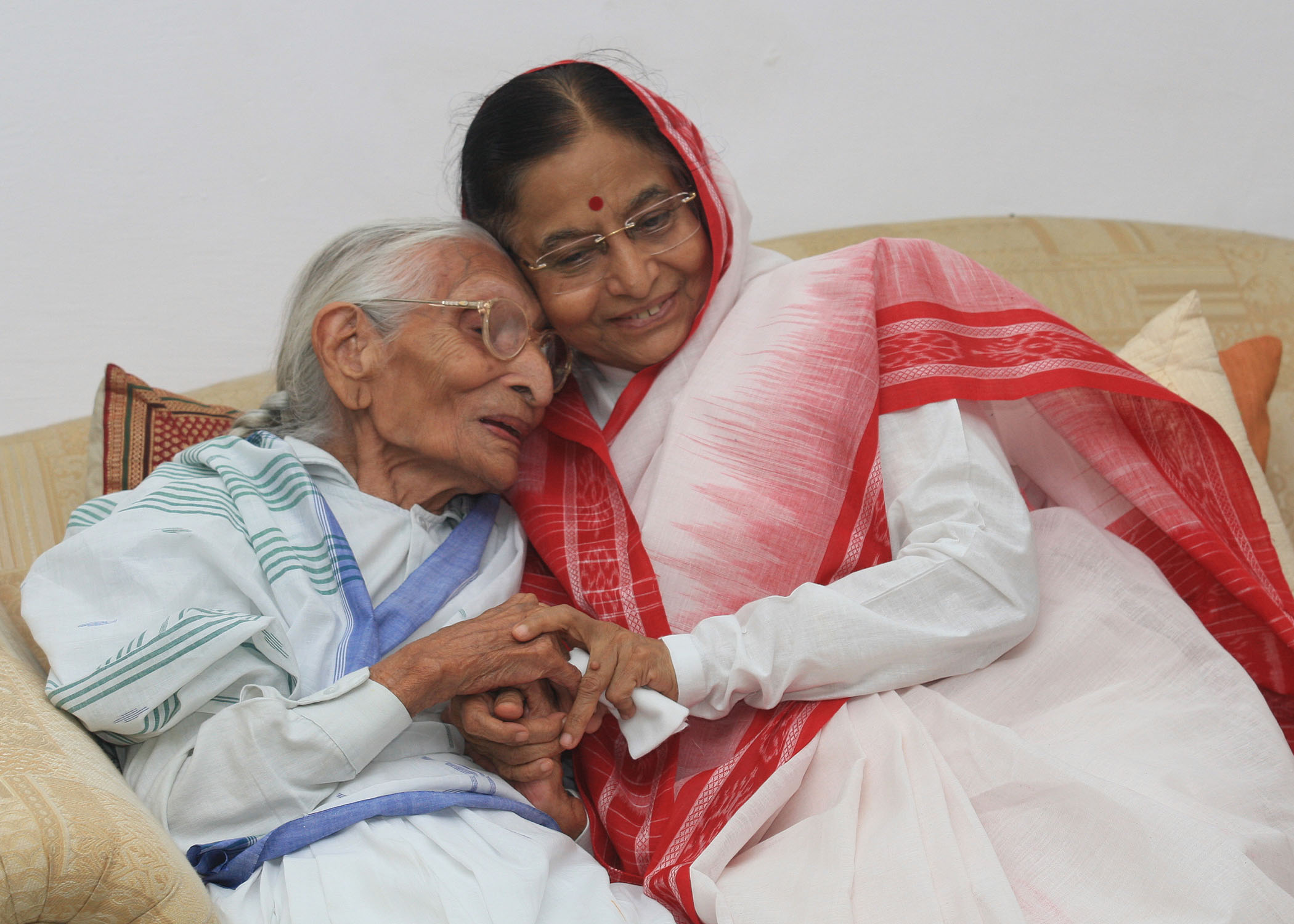
- Smt. Satyawati (left) with President Pratibha Patil in 2009.
- Born: 28 February 1905
- Died: 26 October 2010 (aged 105); Delhi, India
- Known for: Participation in the Indian independence movement
- Spouse: Lala Achint Ram (died 1961)

Satyavati Devi (28 February 1905 – 26 October 2010) was an Indian freedom fighter and Gandhian. At the time of her death on 26 October 2010, she was India's oldest living freedom fighter.

She was born in a Punjabi Hindu family in Tarn Taran district. She did her schooling from Kanya Maha Vidyalay, Jalandhar. She married Lala Achint Ram in 1925. Her marriage was a dowry-less one and she wore no veil, which was the condition set by Achint Ram for marriage. She was popularly known as Bijji or Mataji. She was the mother of India's former Vice President, Krishan Kant. She also had two daughters Nirmala and Subhadra.

On 26 August 1942, she was arrested along with her children for participation in the Indian freedom movement. Along with other women prisoners she hoisted the Indian tricolour in Lahore Jail where she was imprisoned by the British. In prison she protested against the condition of barracks of political prisoners and went on a satyagraha. Post India's independence, she took an active part in Vinoba Bhave's bhoodan movement along with her husband Lala Achint Ram (who died in 1961) who was popularly called "Gandhi of Punjab". He had been a member of Lok Sabha twice. They both urged the landowners to give their land to landless laborers. The revolutionary leader Chandrashekhar Azad stayed at her home for three days before his escape to Lahore. She had often fed the patriot Bhagat Singh with her own hands. Her daughter Subhadra, when arrested was only 13 years old and was the youngest freedom fighter to be arrested. In 1965, she donated all her jewels to the Prime Minister's National Relief Fund.

She was always respected by everyone who came to her home. Her son Krishna Kant became the Governor of Andhra Pradesh in 1989 and continued there until 1997, when he was elevated to the post of Vice President. Krishna Kant took his mother to his home during both occasions. When her son died in 2002, she was sitting beside his body until it was taken for cremation. She outlived him for eight years, dying on 26 October 2010 aged 105, outliving many of her younger co-workers. She was cremated with all state honours at her native village on the next day. A year before death on 9 August 2009, she was honoured by the then President Pratibha Patil as a part of the 67th anniversary commemoration celebrations of the Quit India Movement.
