= Jaipura, Ludhiana =

Jaipura
- Village
- Location in Punjab, India Jaipura (India)
- Coordinates: 30.781257°N 76.026088°E
- Country: India
- State: Punjab
- District: Ludhiana
- Talukas: Doraha

Languages
  - Official: Punjabi
- Time zone: UTC+5:30 (IST)

Jaipura (Village ID 33357) is a village in Ludhiana district in the state of Punjab, India. Doraha is the block and Post Office for Jaipura. The main business of the peoples is wheat farming. Villages is 1.5 km (0.93 mi) away from National Highway No. 1. It is populated mainly by persons whose surname is Benipal, which is one of the most famous surnames in Punjab. Jaipura also has the people of Bhatti and also Grewal caste.

According to the 2011 census it has a population of 1313 living in 242 households.
