= Madpur, Punjab =

Village in Punjab, India

Coordinates: 30°49′23″N 76°07′29″E

Madpur Village is situated in Ludhiana district, in the Indian state of Punjab. It is 48 km from the district headquarters in Ludhiana. Madpur also has Gram Panchayat. Madpur Village's population is 2,168 people, of which the male population is 1,132 and the female population is 1,052.

Madpur Village's Pin code is 141114.
