= Sahnewal Assembly constituency =

Legislative Assembly constituency in Punjab State, India

Coordinates: 30.84°N 75.97°E

Sahnewal
- Constituency No. 59 for the Punjab Legislative Assembly

Constituency details
- Country: India
- State: Punjab
- District: Ludhiana
- Lok Sabha constituency: Fatehgarh Sahib
- Established: 2008
- Total electors: 265,386
- Reservation: None

Member of Legislative Assembly
- 16th Punjab Legislative Assembly
- Incumbent Hardeep Singh Mundian
- Party: Aam Aadmi Party
- Elected year: 2022

Sahnewal Assembly constituency (Sl. No.: 59) is a Punjab Legislative Assembly constituency in Ludhiana district, Punjab state, India.

== Members of the Legislative Assembly ==
Most successful parties from Sahnewal Vidhan Sabha
1. SAD (2 Times) (66.7%)
2. AAP (1 Time) (33.3%)

Year	Member	Party
2012	Sharanjit Singh Dhillon	Shiromani Akali Dal
2017	Sharanjit Singh Dhillon	Shiromani Akali Dal
2022	Hardeep Singh Mundian	Aam Aadmi Party

== Election results ==
=== 2027 ===
Punjab Assembly election, 2027: Sahnewal
Party	Candidate	Votes	%	±%
AAP				
AD (WPD)				New entry
INC				
BSP				
SAD				
BJP				New entry
NOTA	None of the above			
Majority				
Turnout				

=== 2022 ===
Punjab Assembly election, 2022: Sahnewal
Party	Candidate	Votes	%	±%
AAP	Hardeep Singh Mundian	61,515	34.50	▲10.66
INC	Vikram Singh Bajwa	46,322	26.00	▼9.33
SAD	Sharanjit Singh Dhillon	41,772	23.40	▼14.67
SAD(S)	Harpreet Singh Garcha	12,134	6.80	New entry
SAD(A)	Amritpal Singh Chhandran	10,899	6.10	▲5.73
NOTA	None of the above	679	0.30	
Majority		15,193	8.48	
Turnout		179,196	67.5	
Registered electors		265,382		
AAP gain from SAD		Swing		

=== 2017 ===
Punjab Assembly election, 2017: Sahnewal
Party	Candidate	Votes	%	±%
SAD	Sharanjit Singh Dhillon	63,184	38.07	▼15.37
INC	Satwinder Bitti	58,633	35.33	▼2.27
AAP	Harjot Singh Bains	39,570	23.84	New entry
BSP	Surinder Kumar	1,588	0.95	▼2.67
SAD(A)	Manbir Singh Grewal	624	0.37	▲0.10
Majority		4,551	2.74	
Turnout		165,972	75.50	
Registered electors		219,853		
SAD hold		Swing		

=== 2012 ===
2012 Punjab Legislative Assembly election: Sahnewal
Party	Candidate	Votes	%	±%
SAD	Sharanjit Singh Dhillon	71,583	53.44	New entry
INC	Vikram Singh Bajwa	50,367	37.60	New entry
BSP	Labh Singh	4,852	3.62	New entry
Independent	Inderjit Singh Kasabad	2,016	1.51	New entry
CPI(M)	Jagdev Singh Garcha	1,522	1.14	New entry
SAD(A)	Nazar Singh Rayian	368	0.27	New entry
Majority		21,266	15.88	
Turnout		133,944	79.09	
Registered electors		169,367		

== See also ==
- List of constituencies of the Punjab Legislative Assembly
- Ludhiana district
