= Hans (clan) =

Indian social group

- Arora, Jat, Chuhra, and Mirasi
- Ethnicity: Punjabis
- Language: Punjabi

Hans is an Indian Punjabi Hindu and Sikh surname that originates from the Sanskrit hams, meaning swan or goose. It is used as a clan name by the Arora, the Jat, the Bhangi (Chuhra) and the Mirasi castes.

== See also ==
- Hans
