= Lala Achint Ram =

Indian politician (1898–1961)

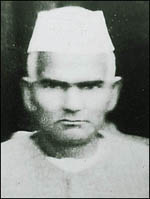

Member of the Indian Parliament for Hissar
- In office 1952 – 1957
- Preceded by: Office established
- Succeeded by: Thakur Das Bhargava

Member of Parliament for Patiala
- In office 1957 – 1961

Personal details
- Born: 19 August 1898 Kot Mohammad Khan village, Tarn Taran district, Punjab Province, British India (present day Punjab, India)
- Died: 1961 (aged 62–63)
- Party: Indian National Congress
- Spouse: Satyavati Devi (m. 1925)
- Children: 3 (incl. Krishna Kant)
- Education: D. A. V. College, Lahore

Lala Achint Ram (19 August 1898 – 1961) was an Indian freedom fighter, Gandhian and a member of the Indian National Congress party.

He was one of the first three members of Servants of the People Society, established by Lala Lajpat Rai in Lahore in 1921. During the Indian independence movement, he was imprisoned for extended periods, including 1930–32, 1939, 1940 and 1942–45 for his participation in the Quit India Movement. Post-partition, he shifted to Delhi, and also remained a member of the Constituent Assembly of India. He won his 1st Lok Sabha elections from the Hissar (Lok Sabha constituency) in Punjab in 1952 and the second time in 1957 from Patiala (Lok Sabha constituency). Through the 1950s, along with his wife, he was active in Bhoodan movement of Vinoba Bhave.

== Early life and background ==
Achint Ram was born in August 1898 in Kot Mohammad Khan village in Khadur Sahib tehsil of Tarn Taran district of Punjab, 50 km from Amritsar. He was educated at government high schools in Amritsar and Shimla. For pursuing higher education he went to DAV College in Lahore (now in Pakistan).

In 1921, he was one of the first three members of Servants of the People Society founded by Lala Lajpat Rai.

He married Satyavati Devi in 1925. Also a freedom fighter herself, she was arrested on 26 August 1942, along with her three young children. She continued her protests inside the prison as well, and organised protests for better living conditions inside the prison. Even after independence, the family stayed back at Lajpat Bhawan in Lahore, where she cooked meals for hundreds of displaced refugees, before shifting themselves to Delhi in 1948. At the time of her death on 26 October 2010 at the age of 105, she was India's oldest surviving freedom fighter.

The couple had two daughters, Nirmala and Subhadra, and son Krishan Kant. Daughter Subhadra Khosla, at age 13, was the youngest freedom fighter to be jailed during independence movement. Krishna Kant remained Vice President of India from August 1997 till his death on 27 July 2002. He was also member of Rajya Sabha, from 1966 to 1977, followed by Lok Sabha from 1977 to 1980.

== Participation in freedom struggle ==
Lala Achint Ram joined the Congress party in his youth and took active part in its movements. He was imprisoned by the British government for his participation in the freedom movements from 1930–32, 1939, 1940, and 1942–45. He had been the member of Congress Working Committee and Punjab Pradesh Congress Committee, All India Congress Committee. He was also the president of Punjab Provincial Election Tribunal and National Industrial High School for a period of two years. He had also been the vice-president of All India Postmen and Lower Grade Staff Union, secretary of the Servants of the People Society and member of the provisional parliament of India from 1950–52.

He had been the member of the Constituent Assembly of India which drafted the constitution of India from 1946 to 1950.

== Post-independence ==
Post partition, the head office of the Servants of the People Society was shifted to Lala Achint Ram's house at 2-Telegraph Lane, New Delhi till 1960, when the new building Lajpat Bhawan, at Lajpat Nagar, Delhi was inaugurated. He contested the first general election and won from Hissar with 66266 votes. He was elected in 1957 Indian general election to the 2nd Lok Sabha from Patiala (Lok Sabha constituency) with 124,380 votes.

He had donated his ancestral house to Kot Mohammad village panchayat to run a Balwadi (play school for children) and stitching and sewing centre for girls in the village. He and I. K. Gujral's father Avatar Narain Gujral were close associates during the freedom movement. In the 1950s he took active part in Vinoba Bhave's Bhoodan movement along with his wife. In 1953, he undertook a padayatra, to Sirsa, Haryana, along with Satya Bala, daughter of Lala Jai Dev Tayal of Hisar to encourage people to donate land to landless labourers.

An auditorium named after him was built in Chandigarh. The foundation stone of the auditorium was laid by then President of India, V. V. Giri on 26 June 1974.
