= Ludhiana district =

- District of Punjab
- Location in Punjab
- Coordinates: 30°53′N 75°51′E
- Country: India
- State: Punjab
- Founder: Chief Yusaf Khan and Nihand Khan, under Sikandar Lodhi's reign
- Named for: Lodhi Dynasty
- Headquarters: Ludhiana

Area
  - Total: 3,767 km^{2} (1,454 sq mi)
  - Rank: 1 (out of 23)

Population (2011)
  - Total: 3,498,739
  - Rank: 1 (out of 23)
  - Density: 975/km^{2} (2,530/sq mi)

Languages
  - Official: Punjabi
  - Regional: Punjabi: (Malwai); (Puadhi)
- Time zone: UTC+5:30 (IST)
- Sex ratio: 1000/873 ♂/♀
- Literacy: 73.5%
- Lok Sabha constituency: 1
- Vidhan Sabha constituency: 14
- HDI (2006): ▲0.761 (High)
- Website: www.ludhiana.nic.in
- ‡: Population increase (2001–2011): 15%

Ludhiana district is one of the 23 districts in the Indian state of Punjab. It is Punjab's largest district by both area and population. Ludhiana, the largest city in Punjab, is the district headquarters. The district falls in the Malwa region of Punjab, specifically the Tihara sub-region of Malwa. The district is part of the Patiala division.

The main industries are bicycle parts and hosiery. Ludhiana is a hub of ladies footwear manufacturing, with around 10,000 small-scale units. The district is made up of seven tehsils, seven sub-tehsils and twelve development blocks.

Ludhiana district has the highest HDI in Punjab at 0.761 (2004 UNDP).

== Etymology ==
The district is named after the Lodhi Dynasty of Delhi, originally spelled as Lodhi-ana, later clubbed and changed to Ludhiana.

== History ==
Ludhiana gets its name from the Lodhi Dynasty, which is believed to have founded the city in 1480. During the reign of the Mughal emperor Akbar, the area formed part of the Sarkar of Sirhind. Chakar, Talwandi Rai in 1478 AD, Raikot in 1648 AD and Jagraon in 1688 AD were founded by the Manj Rajput Rai family of Raikot. It is said that one of the Rai rulers of Raikot, named Rai Kalha (chaudhary of Raikot and Jagraon), gave sanctuary to Guru Gobind Singh in 1705 in the aftermath of the Battle of Chamkaur and Uch-da-Peer (meaning "saint of Uch") episode of the tenth Guru's life, when the Mughal armies were in hot pursuit of the religious leader. In thanks for this, the Guru gifted Ganga Sagar (a metal surahi) and a sword with an inscribed blade to the Rai dynasty of Raikot, known as the Raikot sword.

In the latter period of Mughal rule the western part of the district was leased to the Rais of Raikot. By the early eighteenth century, they had become semi-independent of the Mughals. The villages in Ludhiana district remained independent and under the rule of local powerful village Sikh chieftains, from 1707 to 1835. In 1747 Ahmad Shah Durrani invaded and battled the imperial army near Khanna. Although the Mughals were able to stop Ahmad Shah, his subsequent invasions weakened the Mughals, which allowed the Rais to take control of Ludhiana town in 1760.

During the reign of Maharaja Ranjit Singh, Ludhiana became an important British cantonment. Initially, in 1805, Ranjit Singh occupied Ludhiana. He then granted Ludhiana along with 54 villages to his maternal uncle, Raja Bhag Singh of Jind. Later, Raja Bhag Singh chose the British over Ranjit Singh and handed over Ludhiana to them for the establishment of a cantonment, on a monthly rent. However, Ranjit Singh was forced to sign the treaty of 'perpetual friendship' with the British, which confined his activities to the right bank of the Sutlej. British troops were permanently stationed in Ludhiana and the Cis-Sutlej states came under British protection. Those villages of the Jind ruler were annexed by the British in 1834, after the Raja died without a direct heir. Ludhiana district was annexed by the British from its former Sikh rulers after the First Anglo-Sikh War of 1845–1846.

Until 1947, during the British era, the district was initially part of the Cis-Sutlej Division and was later included in the Jullundur Division. It comprised the tehsils of Ludhiana, Jagraon, and Samrala, while the Payal area was part of Patiala State & Lohat Baddi areas were part of Nabha State.

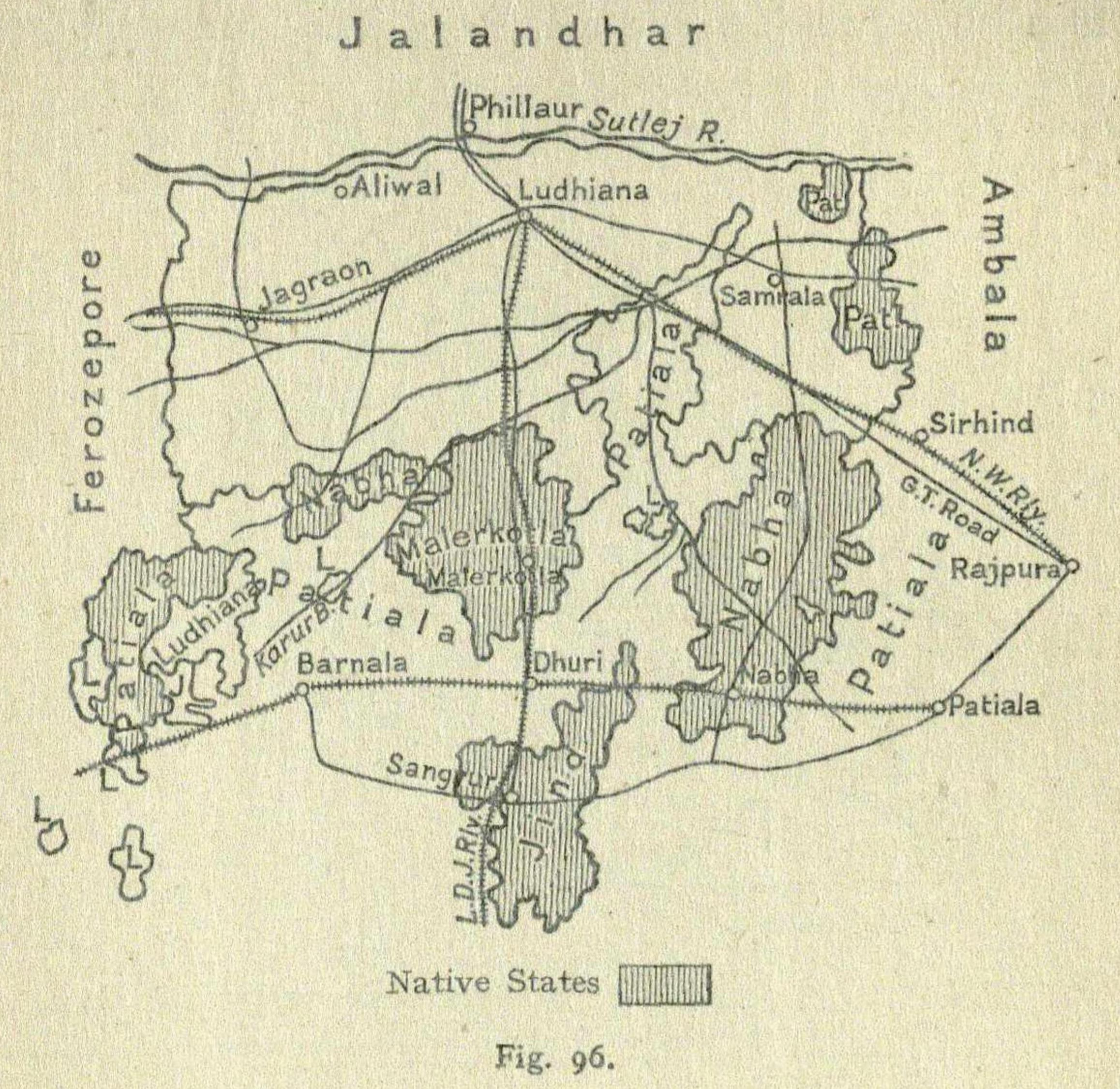
Map of Ludhiana district (and adjoining native states) of Punjab Province, British India, published in 'The Panjab, North-West Frontier Province and Kashmir' (1916)

According to the 1901 census, Hindus numbered 269,076, or 40% of the total; Muslims, 235,937, or 35%; and Sikhs, 164,919, or 24%.; by 1941, Hindus numbered 171,715 (20.98%), Muslims were 302,482 (36.95%), and Sikhs totalled 341,175 (41.68%) of the population. The majority of the Muslim population in the district migrated to Pakistan during the communal violence following the Partition of India in 1947. In turn, the district received 137,185 Sikh and Hindu refugees who migrated from the opposite side (present-day Pakistan) after facing similar violence and displacement.

Historical population
Year	Pop.	±% p.a.
1901	685,038	—
1911	527,575	−2.58%
1921	579,161	+0.94%
1931	687,387	+1.73%
1941	839,622	+2.02%
1951	858,487	+0.22%
1961	1,078,269	+2.31%
1971	1,384,957	+2.53%
1981	1,778,689	+2.53%
1991	2,428,382	+3.16%
2001	3,032,831	+2.25%
2011	3,498,739	+1.44%

== Geography ==
Ludhiana is a centrally located city of Punjab, which is on the Grand Trunk Road from Delhi to Amritsar at latitude 30.55 North and longitude 75.54 East in Northern India.

Ludhiana is the most centrally located district in the Malwa region of the state of Punjab. For administrative purposes, it has been placed in the Patiala Division. It lies between north latitude 30°-34' and 31°-01' and east longitude 75°-18' and 76°-20'.

It is bounded on the north by the Satluj River, which separates it from Jalandhar district. The river forms its northern boundary with Hoshiarpur district. On other sides it shares common boundaries with Rupnagar district in the east, Moga district in the west, and Barnala, Sangrur and Patiala districts in the south and southeast, respectively.

=== Topography ===
The topography of the district is a typical representative of an alluvial plain. It owes its origin to the aggravation work of the Satluj River. The alluvium deposited by the river has been worked over by the wind, which gave rise to a number of small dunes and sand mounds. Most of these dunes have been levelled by farmers.

The district can be divided into the flood plain of the Satluj and the upland plain.

=== Climate ===
Ludhiana features a semi-arid climate under the Köppen climate classification, with three defined seasons; summer, monsoon, and winter. This climate is characterised by dryness except for a brief spell of monsoon season, a very hot summer, and a bracing winter. The cold season is from mid-November to the early part of March. The succeeding period until the end of June is the hot season. July, August and half of September constitute the southwest monsoon. The period of mid-September to about the middle of November may be termed as a post-monsoon or transitional period.

June is generally the hottest month. Hot and scorching dust-laden winds blow during the summer season. December and January are the coldest months. Ludhiana on average sees roughly 809.3 millimetres (31.86 in) of precipitation annually. The official weather station for the city is in the compound of the Civil Surgeon's Office to the west of Ludhiana. Weather records here data back to 1 August 1868.

Climate data for Ludhiana Airport (1991–2020 normals, extremes 1868–present)
Month	Jan	Feb	Mar	Apr	May	Jun	Jul	Aug	Sep	Oct	Nov	Dec	Year
Record high °C (°F)	29.2 (84.6)	33.3 (91.9)	41.1 (106.0)	46.1 (115.0)	48.3 (118.9)	47.9 (118.2)	47.8 (118.0)	44.4 (111.9)	41.7 (107.1)	40.0 (104.0)	35.8 (96.4)	29.4 (84.9)	48.3 (118.9)
Mean daily maximum °C (°F)	17.9 (64.2)	21.8 (71.2)	27.3 (81.1)	34.8 (94.6)	39.0 (102.2)	38.0 (100.4)	34.1 (93.4)	33.4 (92.1)	33.1 (91.6)	31.9 (89.4)	27.1 (80.8)	20.9 (69.6)	29.9 (85.8)
Daily mean °C (°F)	12.0 (53.6)	15.3 (59.5)	20.2 (68.4)	26.5 (79.7)	31.3 (88.3)	32.1 (89.8)	30.4 (86.7)	29.7 (85.5)	28.3 (82.9)	24.6 (76.3)	19.2 (66.6)	13.9 (57.0)	23.6 (74.5)
Mean daily minimum °C (°F)	6.1 (43.0)	8.7 (47.7)	13.0 (55.4)	18.2 (64.8)	23.5 (74.3)	26.1 (79.0)	26.6 (79.9)	25.9 (78.6)	23.5 (74.3)	17.3 (63.1)	11.2 (52.2)	6.8 (44.2)	17.2 (63.0)
Record low °C (°F)	−2.2 (28.0)	−1.1 (30.0)	1.4 (34.5)	7.1 (44.8)	11.7 (53.1)	18.0 (64.4)	17.4 (63.3)	18.0 (64.4)	15.2 (59.4)	8.4 (47.1)	0.3 (32.5)	−1.1 (30.0)	−2.2 (28.0)
Average rainfall mm (inches)	28.0 (1.10)	36.2 (1.43)	27.0 (1.06)	17.5 (0.69)	21.2 (0.83)	87.4 (3.44)	217.1 (8.55)	187.2 (7.37)	138.4 (5.45)	18.8 (0.74)	3.9 (0.15)	8.6 (0.34)	791.1 (31.15)
Average rainy days	2.1	2.9	2.1	1.7	1.7	4.9	8.6	8.7	5.5	1.0	0.4	0.9	40.6
Average relative humidity (%) (at 17:30 IST)	66	58	48	27	26	42	67	73	65	50	50	62	53
Average dew point °C (°F)	8 (46)	12 (54)	15 (59)	16 (61)	19 (66)	23 (73)	26 (79)	26 (79)	24 (75)	19 (66)	13 (55)	10 (50)	18 (64)
Average ultraviolet index	4	5	7	8	9	9	8	7	7	6	5	4	7
Source 1: India Meteorological DepartmentTime and Date (dewpoints, 2005-2015)
Source 2: Weather Atlas

==== Rainfall ====
The rainfall in the district increases from the southwest toward the northeast. About 70% of the rainfall is received during the period of July through September. The rainfall between December and March accounts for 16% of the rainfall; the remaining 14% rainfall is received in the other months.

==== Pollution ====
Ludhiana has one of the worst air pollution problems in India, with particulate matter being over six times the World Health Organization recommended standard, making it the 13th most polluted city in the world in the year 2014. Industrial water pollution is also of significant concern in portions of Ludhiana, notably along the Budha Dariya.

=== Rivers and drains ===
The Sutlej and its tributary, the Buddha Nala, constitute the chief hydrographic features of the district. A brief description of these is as follows.

Sutlej River
originates from Lake Manasarovar in Tibet. After flowing through Himachal Pradesh, it debouches from the Shivaliks. Just about Rupnagar, 32 km east of the boundary of Samrala Tehsil, it flows due west along the top of the district for 96 km and turns, as it leaves Jagraon Tehsil, slightly north toward its junction with the Beas at Harike. It maintains an east–west direction. It can be devastating during floods. The Sutlej has experienced a westward drift during recent times. Old towns and villages, such as Bahlulpur, Machhiwara, and Kum Kalan, were built on its banks. The river has since been dammed at Bhakhra, which has considerably checked its flooding menace in the district.

Buddha Nala
It runs parallel to the Satluj on its south for a fairly large section of its course in the district and ultimately joins the Satluj at Gorsian Kadar Baksh in the northwestern corner of the district. It floods during the rainy season, but in the dry season, it can be crossed on foot at certain points. Ludhiana and Machhiwara are to the south of the Buddha Nala. The water of the stream is polluted after it enters Ludhiana City.

=== Forests ===
There are extant jungles in Ludhiana district. In 2019, 627 acres of jungle in Ludhiana were cleared from encroachment. Two main jungle ranges are the Mattewara range and the Samrala range. Some of the jungles of Ludhiana district are:

- Mattewara jungle
- Haider Nagar jungle
- Hadiwal jungle
- Gopalpur Bulendwal jungle
- Salempur jungle
- Kot Umra jungle
- Gorsian Khan Mohammad jungle
- For Majri jungle
- Macchiwarra (historical)

== Demographics ==
According to the 2011 census, Ludhiana district has a population of 3,498,739 roughly equal to the nation of Panama or the US state of Connecticut. Ludhiana district has a total of 2,560,225 literates which constitutes 73.5% of the population, of which male literary is 76.5% and female literacy is 69.4%. The effective literacy of 7+ population of Ludhiana district is 82.20%, of which male is 86% and female literacy is 77.9%. The sex ratio of 873 females for every 1,000 males. The total Scheduled Caste population is 923,358 (26.39%). There were 716826 households in the district in 2011.

The number of workers in the district is 1285,000, which means a work participation rate of 36.7%. Out of the total workforce of the district, 18.7% are engaged in the agriculture sector, 5.6% are working in the household industry, and the rest are employed in other sectors/industries.

=== Gender ===
The table below shows the sex ratio of Ludhiana district through decades.

Sex ratio of Ludhiana district
Census year	1901	1911	1921	1931	1941	1951	1961	1971	1981	1991	2001	2011
Sex ratio	829	765	784	791	832	852	856	848	860	844	824	873

The table below shows the child sex ratio of children below the age of 6 years in the rural and urban areas of Ludhiana district.

Child sex ratio of children below the age of 6 years in Ludhiana district
Year	Urban	Rural
2011	860	859
2001	819	815

=== Religion ===
Religion in Ludhiana district (2011)
Religion	Percent
Sikhism	53.26%
Hinduism	42.94%
Islam	2.22%
Jainism	0.56%
Christianity	0.47%
Other or not stated	0.55%

Religion in tehsils of Ludhiana district (2011)
Tehsil	Hinduism (%)	Sikhism (%)	Islam (%)	Others (%)
Samrala	22.46	75.78	1.37	0.39
Khanna	36.37	60.53	2.47	0.63
Payal	15.38	81.77	2.52	0.33
Ludhiana East	60.18	34.87	2.74	2.21
Ludhiana West	28.75	68.68	1.39	1.18
Raikot	12.87	84.26	1.51	1.36
Jagraon	12.98	85.48	0.80	0.74

Religion in Ludhiana District
Religious group	1991		2001		2011	
Religious group	Pop.	%	Pop.	%	Pop.	%
Sikhism	1,209,986	66.52%	1,744,446	57.52%	1,863,408	53.26%
Hinduism	586,523	32.25%	1,205,128	39.74%	1,502,403	42.94%
Islam	9,313	0.51%	52,220	1.72%	77,713	2.22%
Christianity	4,040	0.22%	11,656	0.38%	16,517	0.47%
Others	9,050	0.5%	19,381	0.64%	38,698	1.11%
Total Population	1,818,912	100%	3,032,831	100%	3,498,739	100%

The table below shows the population of different religions in absolute numbers in the urban and rural areas of Ludhiana district.

Absolute numbers of different religious groups in Ludhiana district
Religious group	Urban (2011)		Rural (2011)		Urban (2001)		Rural (2001)		Urban (1991)		Rural (1991)	
Religious group	Pop.	%	Pop.	%	Pop.	%	Pop.	%	Pop.	%	Pop.	%
Sikhism	680,189	32.86%	1,183,219	82.8%	583,996	34.48%	1,160,450	86.65%	278,566	36.45%	931,420	88.31%
Hinduism	1,289,159	62.29%	213,244	14.92%	1,046,285	61.78%	158,843	11.86%	471,801	61.74%	114,722	10.88%
Islam	53,201	2.57%	24,512	1.72%	35,022	2.07%	17,198	1.28%	2,336	0.31%	6,977	0.66%
Christianity	13,469	0.65%	3,048	0.21%	9,900	0.58%	1,756	0.13%	3,229	0.42%	811	0.08%
Other/no religion	33,690	1.63%	5,008	0.35%	18,450	1.09%	931	0.07%	8,208	1.07%	842	0.08%
Total population	2,069,708	100%	1,429,031	100%	1,693,653	100%	1,339,178	100%	764,140	100%	1,054,772	100%

Religious groups in Ludhiana District (British Punjab province era)
Religious group	1881		1891		1901		1911		1921		1931		1941	
Religious group	Pop.	%	Pop.	%	Pop.	%	Pop.	%	Pop.	%	Pop.	%	Pop.	%
Hinduism (Note: 1931-1941: Including Ad-Dharmis)	275,240	44.48%	278,035	42.86%	269,076	39.98%	131,370	25.4%	135,512	23.87%	120,161	17.87%	171,715	20.98%
Islam	213,954	34.57%	226,687	34.94%	235,937	35.05%	176,043	34.04%	192,961	33.99%	235,598	35.03%	302,482	36.95%
Sikhism	127,143	20.55%	141,603	21.83%	164,919	24.5%	207,042	40.03%	235,721	41.53%	312,829	46.52%	341,175	41.68%
Jainism	2,165	0.35%	2,025	0.31%	2,217	0.33%	1,849	0.36%	1,796	0.32%	1,419	0.21%	1,279	0.16%
Christianity	322	0.05%	372	0.06%	947	0.14%	888	0.17%	1,613	0.28%	2,477	0.37%	1,913	0.23%
Zoroastrianism	0	0%	0	0%	1	0%	0	0%	19	0%	5	0%	1	0%
Buddhism	0	0%	0	0%	0	0%	0	0%	0	0%	5	0%	0	0%
Judaism	—N/a	—N/a	0	0%	0	0%	0	0%	0	0%	0	0%	0	0%
Others	11	0%	0	0%	0	0%	0	0%	0	0%	0	0%	50	0.01%
Total population	618,835	100%	648,722	100%	673,097	100%	517,192	100%	567,622	100%	672,494	100%	818,615	100%
Note: British Punjab province era district borders are not an exact match in the present-day due to various bifurcations to district borders — which since created new districts — throughout the historic Punjab Province region during the post-independence era that have taken into account population increases.

Religion in the Tehsils of Ludhiana District (1941)
Tehsil	Hinduism		Islam		Sikhism		Christianity		Jainism		Others (Note: Including Anglo-Indian Christians, British Christians, Buddhism, Zoroastrianism, Judaism, Tribals, others, or not stated)		Total	
Tehsil	Pop.	%	Pop.	%	Pop.	%	Pop.	%	Pop.	%	Pop.	%	Pop.	%
Ludhiana Tehsil	95,362	21.84%	171,482	39.27%	168,011	38.48%	840	0.19%	605	0.14%	327	0.07%	436,627	100%
Jagraon Tehsil	33,529	14.84%	81,380	36.02%	110,061	48.71%	289	0.13%	669	0.3%	4	0%	225,932	100%
Samrala Tehsil	42,824	27.44%	49,620	31.8%	63,103	40.44%	503	0.32%	5	0%	1	0%	156,056	100%
Note1: British Punjab province era tehsil borders are not an exact match in the present-day due to various bifurcations to tehsil borders — which since created new tehsils — throughout the historic Punjab Province region during the post-independence era that have taken into account population increases. Note2: Tehsil religious breakdown figures for Christianity only includes local Christians, labelled as "Indian Christians" on census. Does not include Anglo-Indian Christians or British Christians, who were classified under "Other" category.

Religion in the Tehsils of Ludhiana District (1921)
Tehsil	Hinduism		Islam		Sikhism		Christianity		Jainism		Others (Note: Including Buddhism, Zoroastrianism, Judaism, Tribals, others, or not stated)		Total	
Tehsil	Pop.	%	Pop.	%	Pop.	%	Pop.	%	Pop.	%	Pop.	%	Pop.	%
Ludhiana Tehsil	70,047	24.5%	99,889	34.93%	114,146	39.92%	827	0.29%	1,025	0.36%	19	0.01%	285,953	100%
Jagraon Tehsil	28,500	17.32%	56,256	34.19%	78,782	47.88%	471	0.29%	544	0.33%	0	0%	164,553	100%
Samrala Tehsil	36,965	31.56%	36,816	31.44%	42,793	36.54%	315	0.27%	227	0.19%	0	0%	117,116	100%
Note: British Punjab province era tehsil borders are not an exact match in the present-day due to various bifurcations to tehsil borders — which since created new tehsils — throughout the historic Punjab Province region during the post-independence era that have taken into account population increases.

=== Language ===
Languages of Ludhiana district (First Language) (2011)
1. Punjabi (79.7%)
2. Hindi (18.2%)
3. Others (2.16%)

At the time of the 2011 census 79.65% of the population spoke Punjabi and 18.19% Hindi as their first language. Hindi is spoken mainly in urban areas.

== Health ==
The table below shows the data from the district nutrition profile of children below the age of 5 years, in Ludhiana, as of year 2020.

District nutrition profile of children under 5 years of age in Ludhiana, year 2020
Indicators	Number of children (<5 years)	Percent (2020)	Percent (2016)
Stunted	58,009	22%	30%
Wasted	15,436	6%	18%
Severely wasted	2,577	1%	3%
Underweight	32,712	12%	28%
Overweight/obesity	16,856	6%	1%
Anemia	184,062	78%	61%
Total children	262,962		

The table below shows the district nutrition profile of Ludhiana of women between the ages of 15 and 49 years, as of year 2020.

District nutritional profile of Ludhiana of women of 15–49 years, in 2020
Indicators	Number of women (15–49 years)	Percent (2020)	Percent (2016)
Underweight (BMI <18.5 kg/m^2)	113,226	10%	9%
Overweight/obesity	504,983	45%	35%
Hypertension	294,321	26%	15%
Diabetes	171,799	15%	NA
Anemia (non-preg)	727,404	65%	66%
Anemia (preg)	NA	NA	46%
Total women (preg)	62,825		
Total women	1,119,944		

The table below shows the current use of family planning methods by currently married women between the ages of 15 and 49 years, in Ludhiana district.

Family planning methods used by women between the ages of 15 and 49 years, in Ludhiana district
Method	Total (2015–16)	Urban (2015–16)	Rural (2015–16)
Female sterilisation	34.2%	30.4%	40.7%
Male sterilisation	0.6%	0.2%	1.3%
IUD/PPIUD	7.2%	9.2%	3.8%
Pill	1.8%	2.1%	1.2%
Condom	18.0%	18.3%	17.4%
Any modern method	61.7%	60.1%	64.3%
Any method	72.8%	72.3%	73.5%
Total unmet need	5.0%	4.5%	5.9%
Unmet need for spacing	2.1%	1.5%	3.1%

The table below shows the number of road accidents and people affected in Ludhiana district by year.

Road accidents and people affected in Ludhiana district by year
Year	Accidents	Killed	Injured	Vehicles Involved
2022	803	647	342	825
2021	797	632	299	762
2020	695	508	298	577
2019	857	604	458	807

== Government and politics ==
=== Politics ===
The district is a part of the Ludhiana Lok Sabha constituency and Fatehgarh Sahib Lok Sabha constituency. Ludhiana East, Ludhiana North, Ludhiana Central, Ludhiana West, Ludhiana South, Atam Nagar, Dakha, Gill and Jagraon comes under Ludhiana Lok Sabha constituency. Khanna, Samrala, Sahnewal, Payal and Raikot comes under Fatehgarh Sahib Lok Sabha constituency.Amrinder Singh Raja Warring is the MP from Ludhiana and Dr. Amar Singh is current MP from Fatehgarh Sahib, they both are member of Indian National Congress. Amrinder Singh Raja Warring is MP since 2024 and Dr. Amar Singh is MP since 2019. There are total 14 assembly constituencies in Ludhiana district. Following is a list of the assembly constituencies in the district.

#	Name	District	Member	Party	Leading (in 2024)
60	Ludhiana East	Ludhiana	Daljit Singh Grewal	AAP	BJP
61	Ludhiana South	Ludhiana	Rajinder Pal Kaur Chhina	AAP	BJP
62	Atam Nagar	Ludhiana	Kulwant Singh Sidhu	AAP	INC
63	Ludhiana Central	Ludhiana	Ashok Prashar Pappi	AAP	BJP
64	Ludhiana West	Ludhiana	Sanjeev Arora	AAP	BJP
65	Ludhiana North	Ludhiana	Madan Lal Bagga	AAP	BJP
66	Gill (SC)	Ludhiana	Jiwan Singh Sangowal	AAP	INC
68	Dakha	Ludhiana	Manpreet Singh Ayali	Independent	INC
70	Jagraon (SC)	Ludhiana	Saravjit Kaur Manuke	AAP	INC

=== MLAs ===
No.	Constituency	Name of MLA	Party	Bench
57	Khanna	Tarunpreet Singh Sond	Aam Aadmi Party	Government
58	Samrala	Jagtar Singh	Aam Aadmi Party	Government
59	Sahnewal	Hardeep Singh Mundian	Aam Aadmi Party	Government
60	Ludhiana East	Daljit Singh Grewal	Aam Aadmi Party	Government
61	Ludhiana South	Rajinder Pal Kaur Chhina	Aam Aadmi Party	Government
62	Atam Nagar	Kulwant Singh Sidhu	Aam Aadmi Party	Government
63	Ludhiana Central	Ashok Prashar Pappi	Aam Aadmi Party	Government
64	Ludhiana West	Gurpreet Gogi	Aam Aadmi Party	Government
65	Ludhiana North	Madan Lal Bagga	Aam Aadmi Party	Government
66	Gill (SC)	Jiwan Singh Sangowal	Aam Aadmi Party	Government
67	Payal (SC)	Manwinder Singh Gyaspura	Aam Aadmi Party	Government
68	Dakha	Manpreet Singh Ayali	Shiromani Akali Dal	Opposition
69	Raikot (SC)	Hakam Singh Thekedar	Aam Aadmi Party	Government
70	Jagraon (SC)	Saravjit Kaur Manuke	Aam Aadmi Party	Government

=== Administrative divisions ===
For the administrative purpose, Ludhiana district is divided into seven tehsils, which are: -

1. Jagraon
2. Khanna
3. Ludhiana (East)
4. Ludhiana (West)
5. Payal
6. Raikot
7. Samrala

Ludhiana West Tehsil is a tehsil in Ludhiana district. It has 125 villages.

Ludhiana East Tehsil is a tehsil in Ludhiana district. It has 181 villages.

Also, there are seven sub-tehsils in Ludhiana district: -

1. Dehlon
2. Koom Kalan
3. Ludhiana Central
4. Machhiwara
5. Maloud
6. Mullanpur Dakha
7. Sidhwan Bet

==== Subdistricts of Ludhiana district ====
According to the Indian government's integrated online directory, Ludhiana district is divided into the following subdistricts (tehsils/subdivisions) and blocks:

- Subdistricts
  1. Jagraon
  2. Khanna
  3. Ludhiana (East)
  4. Ludhiana (West)
  5. Payal
  6. Raikot
  7. Samrala
- Blocks:
  1. Dehlon
  2. Doraha
  3. Jagraon
  4. Khanna
  5. Koom Kalan
  6. Ludhiana-1
  7. Ludhiana-2
  8. Machhiwara
  9. Maloud
  10. Mullanpur
  11. Pakhowal
  12. Raikot
  13. Samrala
  14. Sudhar

== Culture/Cityscape ==
=== Places of interest ===
- Alamgir
- Chupki
- Chhapar
- Gharkhana
- Jaipura
- Katana Sahib
- Kila Raipur
- Killa Hans
- Madpur
- Nanaksar
- Pandher Kheri
- Serai Lashkari Khan
- Sidhwanbet
- Sudhar
- Sarabha

== Notable people ==
- Aditi Avasthi, an entrepreneur, founder and CEO of Embibe, an artificial intelligence educational technology platform
- Amit Bhalla (Ninja), a Punjabi singer and actor
- Praveen Chaudhari, an Indian-American physicist who has contributed to the field of material physics
- Gippy Grewal, a singer and actor
- Gursimrat Singh Gill, professional footballer
- Prabhsukhan Singh Gill, professional footballer who has played for Kerala Blasters and East Bengal FC
- Rachpal Singh Gill, civil engineer known for notable engineering projects such as the Bhakra Nangal hydro power complex.
- Kartar Singh Sarabha, an Indian revolutionary
- Dalip Singh, a track and field athlete, who competed in the 1924 and 1928 Summer Olympics
- Jagmohan Singh, a hurdle athlete, who competed in 1960 Summer Olympics
- Dalip Kaur Tiwana, a Punjabi-language writer
- Nehal Wadhera, an Indian cricketer who plays for Punjab cricket team in domestic cricket, having previously represented the India under-19 cricket team
