= Hans =

Hans may refer to:

== People and fictional characters ==
- Hans (given name), a male given name, including lists of people and fictional characters
- Hans (surname), a list of people
- Hans (clan), a tribal clan and surname in Punjab, India

== Places ==
- Hans, Marne, a commune in France
- Hans Island, part of both Greenland and Canada
- Killa Hans (lit. 'Fort Hans'), a village in Punjab, India

== Arts and entertainment ==
- Hans (film) a 2006 Italian film directed by Louis Nero
- Hans (Frozen), the main antagonist of the 2013 Disney animated film Frozen
- Hans (magazine), an Indian Hindi literary monthly
- Hans, a comic book drawn by Grzegorz Rosiński and later by Zbigniew Kasprzak

== Other uses ==
- Clever Hans, the "wonder horse"
- The Hans India, an English language newspaper in India
- HANS device, a racing car safety device
- Hans v. Louisiana, an 1890 United States Supreme Court case
- Hans, the ISO 15924 code for Simplified Chinese characters

== See also ==
- Han (disambiguation)
