= Ludhiana Central Assembly constituency =

Legislative Assembly constituency in Punjab State, India

Coordinates: 30.91°N 75.85°E

Ludhiana Central
- Constituency No. 63 for the Punjab Legislative Assembly

Constituency details
- Country: India
- State: Punjab
- District: Ludhiana
- Lok Sabha constituency: Ludhiana
- Total electors: 158,945
- Reservation: None

Member of Legislative Assembly
- 16th Punjab Legislative Assembly
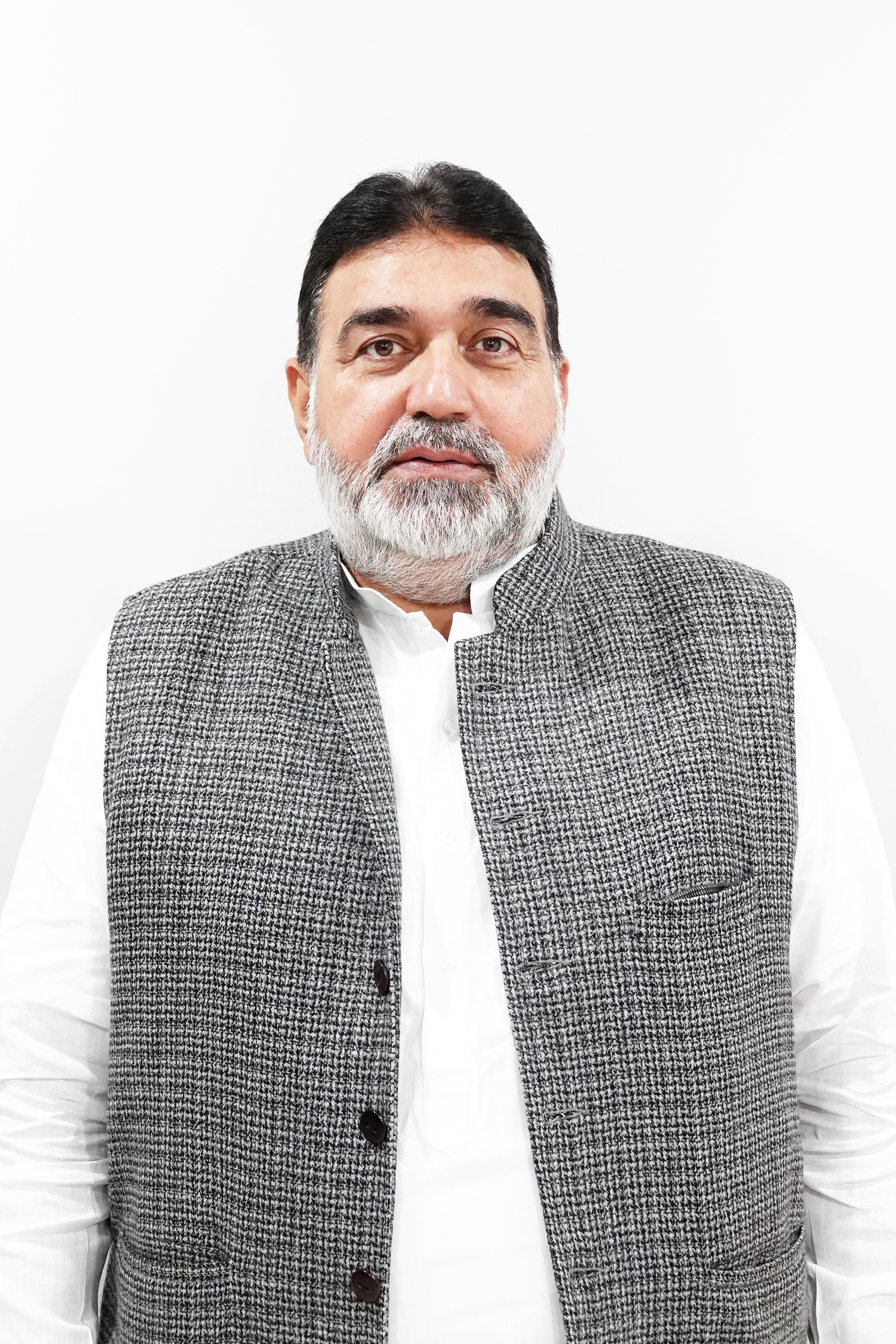
- Incumbent Ashok Prashar (Pappi)
- Party: Aam Aadmi Party
- Elected year: 2022

Ludhiana Central Assembly constituency is one of the 117 Legislative Assembly constituencies of Punjab state in India. It is part of Ludhiana district, which is one of the major industrial and commercial centers in Punjab.

== Members of the Legislative Assembly ==
Most successful parties from Ludhiana Central Vidhan Sabha
1. INC (2 Times) (66.7%)
2. AAP (1 Time) (33.3%)

Year	Member	Party
2012	Surinder Kumar Dawar	Indian National Congress
2017	Surinder Kumar Dawar	Indian National Congress
2022	Ashok Prashar (Pappi)	Aam Aadmi Party

== Election results ==
=== 2027 ===
Punjab Assembly election, 2027: Ludhiana Central
Party	Candidate	Votes	%	±%
AAP	Ashok Parashar Pappi			
AD (WPD)				New entry
INC				
BSP				
SAD				
BJP				
NOTA	None of the above			
Majority				
Turnout				

=== 2022 ===
Punjab Assembly election, 2022: Ludhiana Central
Party	Candidate	Votes	%	±%
AAP	Ashok Prashar (Pappi)	32,789	33.60	New entry
BJP	Gurdev Sharma Debi	27,985	28.60	▲1.73
INC	Surinder Kumar Dawar	26,972	27.60	▼19.36
SAD	Pritpal Singh Pali	8,220	8.35	New entry
NOTA	None of the above	670	0.40	
Majority		4,804	4.88	
Turnout		98,405	61.9	
Registered electors		158,945		
AAP gain from INC		Swing		

=== 2017 ===
Punjab Assembly election, 2017: Ludhiana Central
Party	Candidate	Votes	%	±%
INC	Surinder Kumar Dawar	47,871	46.96	▼2.12
BJP	Gurdev Sharma Debi	27,391	26.87	▼14.81
LIP	Vipan Sood Kaka	25,001	24.52	New entry
NOTA	None of the above	1,064	1.04	
Majority		20,480	20.10	
Turnout		101,948	69.80	
Registered electors		147,644		
INC hold		Swing		

=== 2012 ===
Punjab Assembly election, 2012: Ludhiana Central
Party	Candidate	Votes	%	±%
INC	Surinder Kumar Dawar	47,737	49.08	New entry
BJP	Satpal Gosain	40,541	41.68	New entry
Independent	Ajay Nayyar	5,732	5.89	New entry
BSP	Rajan Masih	954	0.98	New entry
PPoP	Amarjeet Singh Madaan	863	0.89	New entry
Majority		7,196	7.40	
Turnout		97,266	72.10	
Registered electors		134,915		

== See also ==
- List of constituencies of the Punjab Legislative Assembly
- Ludhiana district
