= Ranjit Singh Dhillon =

Indian politician

Member of the Punjab Legislative Assembly
- In office 6 March 2012 – 11 March 2017
- Preceded by: Satpal Gosain
- Succeeded by: Sanjeev Talwar
- Constituency: Ludhiana East

Personal details
- Born: 23 August 1965 (age 60) Ludhiana, Punjab, India
- Party: Shiromani Akali Dal
- Occupation: Politician

Ranjit Singh Dhillon is an Indian politician from the state of Punjab and was member of the Punjab Legislative Assembly from 2012 to 2017.

== Politics ==
Dhillon was elected as a MLA from Ludhiana East in 2012 and remained in office till 2017. In 2017 Elections he lost to Indian National Congress Candidate Sanjeev Talwar and he served as Shiromani Akali Dal candidate for 2022 Punjab Legislative Assembly election from Ludhiana East Constituency where he lost to Daljit Singh Grewal of AAP . In 2024 elections he contested as Akali Dal candidate from Ludhiana but lost to Amrinder Singh Raja Warring of Indian National Congress

== Political party ==
Dhillon is a member of Shiromani Akali Dal.
