= Rachpal Singh Gill =

Indian civil engineer (1908–2001)

- Born: 3 April 1908
- Died: 10 August 2001 (aged 93)
- Occupation: engineer

Er. Rachpal Singh Gill (3 April 1908 – 10 August 2001) was a Sikh Indian civil engineer responsible for key engineering projects such as the Bhakra Nangal hydro power complex, Ranjit Sagar Dam, Pong Dam, and the thermal power plants at Bathinda as well as Roopnagar.

== Early life and education ==
The second son of the first Sikh railway engineer Sardar Nagiah Singh Gill, he was born in Ludhiana. Rachpal Singh graduated in civil engineering from King's College, University of London.

== Career ==
He started his career when he joined the Irrigation Branch in 1943. After partition, he was selected to work as Officer on Special Duty dealing with the sensitive problems of water disputes.

He also served as the Chairman for the Punjab State Electricity Board (PSEB) in the 1960s, Chairman of the Board of Consultants and Construction, Planning and Equipment Committee of Ranjit Sagar Dam. and was widely regarded as an excellent technocrat.

== Family ==
His children include the famous DGP of Punjab K.P.S. Gill.

== Works ==
- Manufacture and Control of Concrete for the Bakhra Dam, by R. S. Gill and Harish Chander Indian Concrete Journal (ICJ), Vol.34 No. p .444
