= Ashok Parashar Pappi =

Indian politician from Punjab

Ashok Prashar Pappi
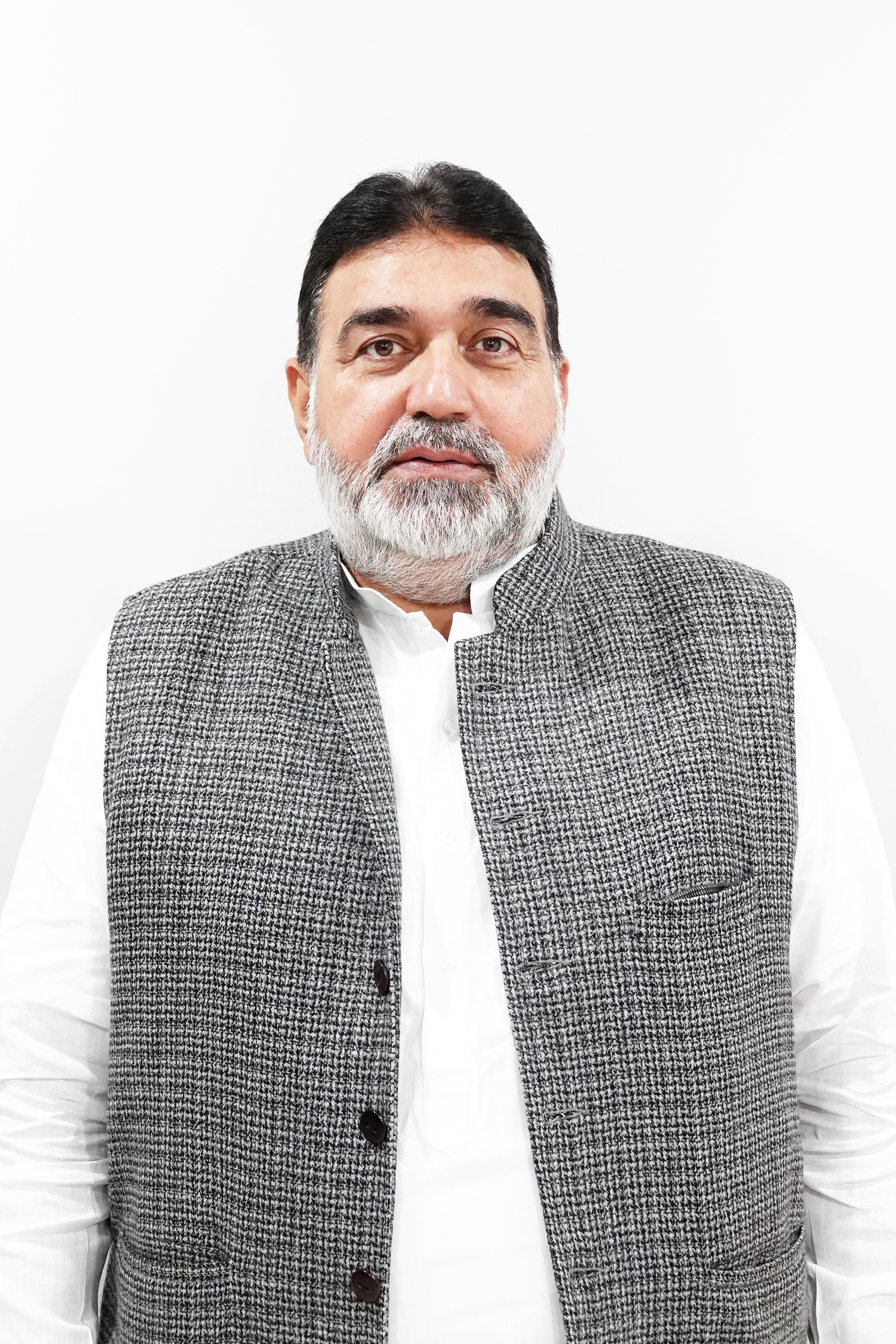
- Ashok Prashar Pappi member of Punjab Legislative Assembly from Ludhiana Central constituency

Member of the Punjab Legislative Assembly
- Incumbent
- Assumed office 11 March 2022
- Preceded by: Surinder Kumar Dawar
- Constituency: Ludhiana Central

Personal details
- Born: 28 November 1964 (age 61) Ludhiana
- Party: Aam Aadmi Party
- Profession: Politician

Ashok Prashar (Pappi) (born November 28, 1964) is an Aam Aadmi Party politician from Punjab. Currently, he represents the Ludhiana Central Assembly constituency.

== Political career ==
In 2022, he won the Ludhiana Central on an Aam Aadmi Party ticket, he defeated Surinder Kumar Dawar of Congress and Gurdev Sharma Debi of BJP. The Aam Aadmi Party gained a strong 79% majority in the sixteenth Punjab Legislative Assembly by winning 92 out of 117 seats in the 2022 Punjab Legislative Assembly election. MP Bhagwant Mann was sworn in as Chief Minister on 16 March 2022.

== Highlights ==
Pioneered the program to add a dose of vitamins, antioxidants, and proteins through fruits and cheese to 4000 midday meals. He further ensured to keep a regular check on the reform initiated and well-executed.

Committee assignments of Punjab Legislative Assembly

- Member (2022–23) Committee on Petitions
- Member (2022–23) Committee on Questions & References

In 2023, during severe flood‑like conditions in central Ludhiana especially in areas such as Dhoka Mohalla, Madhopuri, and Ranjit Park Area, MLA Pappi personally assessed the situation and aided affected residents. According to reports, he distributed milk packets to children and delivered cooked meals door‑to‑door until the floodwaters receded. Afterward, he advocated for infrastructure improvements. Eventually, three powerful motors (170 hp each) were installed to speed up drainage in flood‑prone areas, including Dhoka Mohalla, Ranjit Park, and Dharampura, helping prevent water from accumulating so quickly during heavy rain.

In 2024, Ashok Parashar Pappi stood as a candidate for the Lok Sabha elections from the Ludhiana constituency. He filed his nomination papers as an Aam Aadmi Party (AAP) candidate and received 237,077 votes in the election.

== Electoral performance ==
Punjab Assembly election, 2022: Ludhiana Central
Party	Candidate	Votes	%	±%
AAP	Ashok Prashar (Pappi)	32,789	33.60	
BJP	Gurdev Sharma Debi	27,985	28.60	
INC	Surinder Kumar Dawar	26,972	27.60	
SAD	Pritpal Singh Pali	8,220	8.35	
NOTA	None of the above	670	0.4	
Majority		4,804	4.88	
Turnout		98,405	61.9	
Registered electors		158,945		

2024 Indian general elections: Ludhiana
Party	Candidate	Votes	%	±%
INC	Amrinder Singh Raja Warring	322,224	30.42	▼6.24
BJP	Ravneet Singh Bittu	301,282	28.45	New entry
AAP	Ashok Prashar Pappi	237,077	22.38	▲20.86
SAD	Ranjit Singh Dhillon	90,220	8.52	▼20.08
NOTA	None of the above	5,076	0.48	▼0.53
Majority		20,942	1.98	▼5.32
Turnout		1,059,157		
INC hold		Swing	▼6.24	
