= Killa Hans =

- Village
- Location in Punjab, India Killa Hans (India)
- Coordinates: 30°42′32″N 75°55′52″E
- country: India
- state: Punjab
- district: Ludhiana
- ਬਲਾਕ: ਡੇਹਲੋਂ

ਭਾਸ਼ਾਵਾਂ
  - ਸਰਕਾਰੀ: ਪੰਜਾਬੀ
- Time zone: UTC+5:30 (ਭਾਰਤੀ ਮਿਆਰੀ ਸਮਾਂ)
- ਨੇੜੇ ਦਾ ਸ਼ਹਿਰ: ਅਹਿਮਦਗੜ੍ਹ

Killa Hans is a village located in Ludhiana district, Punjab, India. It is situated 150 km northeast of the sacred city of Amritsar and is 140 km west of Shri Anandpur Sahib, the birthplace of the Khalsa.

== History ==
The neighbourhood of Killa Hans is home to historic Gurudwaras of the sixth Guru, Sahib Shri Guru Hargobind Sahib and the 10th Guru, Sahib Shri Guru Gobind Singh. The Wadda Ghallugara, took place in 1762 at Kup Rihida, 12 km from Killa Hans.
