= Servants of the People Society =

Non-profit organisation in India

Servants of the People Society (SOPS) (Hindi _{(ISO)} : Lōka Sēvaka Maṇḍala ) is a non-profit social service organization founded by Lala Lajpat Rai, a prominent leader in the Indian Independence movement, in 1921 in Lahore. The society is devoted to "enlist and train national missionaries for the service of the motherland". It was shifted to India, following the partition of India in 1947, and functioned from the residence of Lala Achint Ram, a founder member and Lok Sabha, M.P. at 2-Telegraph Lane, New Delhi. In 1960, after the construction of the new building its shifted to Lajpat Bhawan, Lajpat Nagar, in Delhi. Today, it has branches in many parts of India.

== History ==
With an aim to create missionary social worker freedom fighter, Lala Lajpat Rai, founded the organisation in November 1921. It was inaugurated by Mahatma Gandhi, and Lalaji who had donated his bungalow in Lahore to the organisation and his library of over 5000 books, remained its founding President till his death in 1928. Its subsequent Presidents were Purushottam Das Tandon, Balwantrai Mehta, and Lal Bahadur Shastri.

"The Society was initially started with the Tilak School of Politics in 1921, to train those who would work in the political field. The state of the country during 1921 engendered a war atmosphere in which normal priorities had to be waived. The initiates pledged to serve the Society and were bound only by their word and sense of honor and of duty."

The organization's programs today include providing a forum for farmers to sell their produce in cities, providing artisans from rural areas with a place to sell their services and products in cities. The non-profit is also involved in education and family health campaigns.

Lal Bahadur Shastri, second prime minister of India, was a lifelong member of the society
