= Daljit Singh Grewal =

Indian politician

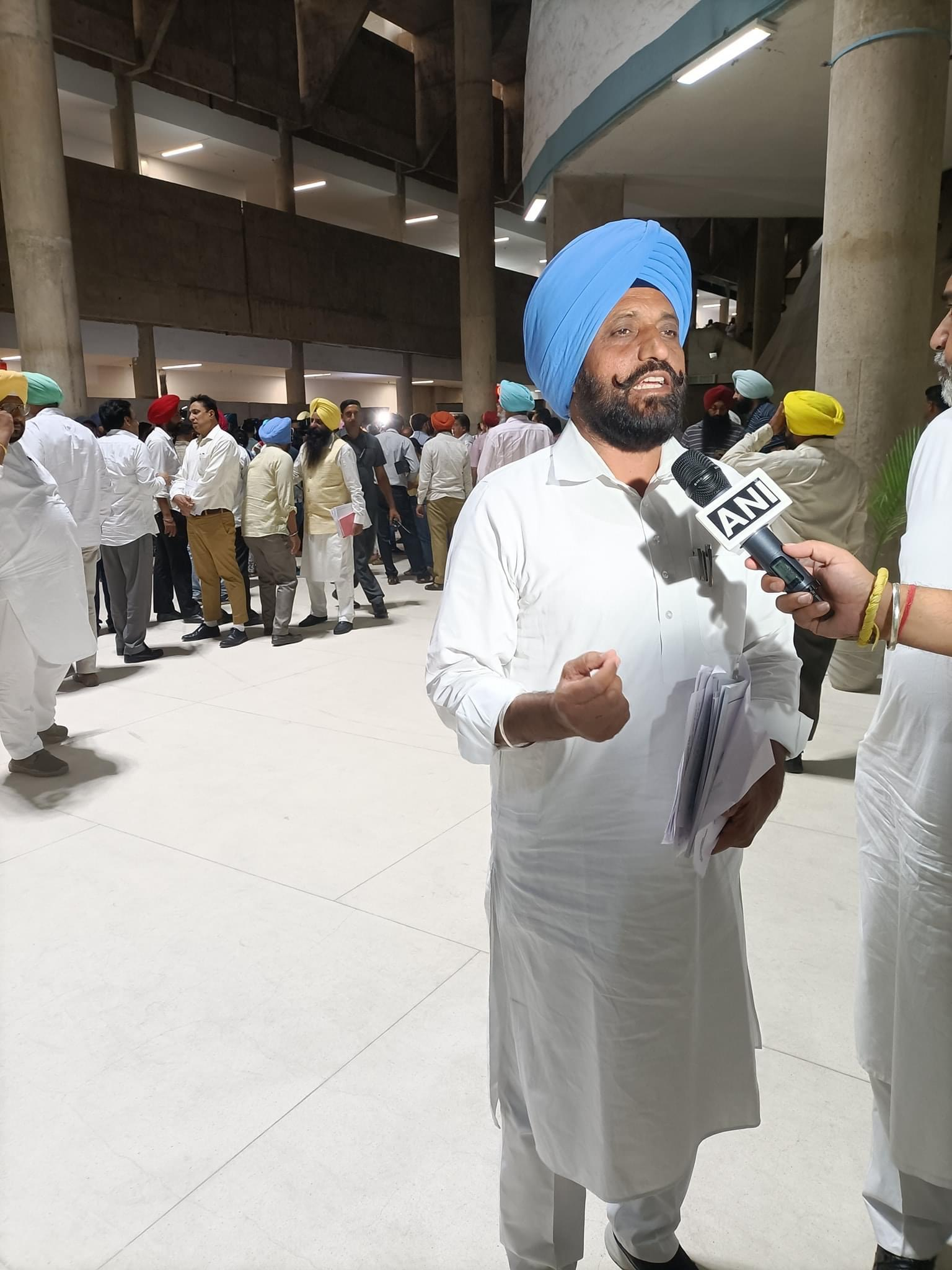

MLA, Punjab Legislative Assembly
- Incumbent
- Assumed office 2022
- Preceded by: Sanjeev Talwar
- Constituency: Ludhiana East

Personal details
- Party: Aam Aadmi Party
- Profession: Politician

Daljit Singh Grewal is an Indian politician and the MLA representing the Ludhiana East Assembly constituency in the Punjab Legislative Assembly. He is a member of the Aam Aadmi Party. He was elected as the MLA in the 2022 Punjab Legislative Assembly election.

== Political career ==
Daljit Singh Grewal started his political career in 2008 by contesting Ludhiana Municipal Elections as an independent candidate. He registered an easy win and became councilor of Ward No.8. Daljit Singh soon became popular as a political figure. He then filed as an independent candidate in 2012 Punjab Legislative Assembly Elections from Ludhiana East constituency. Under the election symbol letter box he got more than 20 thousand votes but gradually lost to Akali Dal's Ranjit Singh Dhillon. In the next Municipal Elections he was again elected as councilor of Ward No. 8 and he got highest lead in the city. In 2014 he joined Team Insaaf led by Simarjit Singh Bains. They protested against the at time Akali Dal's government and raised question against illegal works of mining, transportation and many more issues.

In 2016, Daljit Singh Grewal parted ways with Team Insaaf and joined Aam Aadmi Party. He was given party ticket from Ludhiana East for 2017 Punjab Assembly Elections. He got second highest votes and lost to Congress’ Sanjay Talwar by 1581 votes. After the elections he was made Aam Aadmi Ludhiana Urban's president. In 2018 Ludhiana Municipal Elections, his wife Balwinder Grewal contested and was chosen as councilor of Ward Number 11.

In 2019 he left AAP. This came as a huge shock to AAP. He later joined INC. But his time at INC came short due to bad leadership of Capt. Amrinder Singh led government. After 2 years stay at INC he again joined AAP. Raghav Chadha and other senior leaders were present at his joining day.

== MLA ==
In 2022 Punjab Legislative Assembly election he was again chosen as AAP's candidate from Ludhiana East. He won the elections by lead of 35873 votes and became MLA of Ludhiana East. Aam Aadmi Party gained a strong 79% majority in the sixteenth Punjab Legislative Assembly by winning 92 out of 117 seats in the 2022 Punjab Legislative Assembly election.

Committee assignments of Punjab Legislative Assembly

- Member (2022–23) Committee on Questions & References
- Member (2022–23) Committee on Co-operation and its allied activities

== Electoral performance ==
Punjab Assembly election, 2022: Ludhiana East
Party	Candidate	Votes	%	±%
AAP	Daljit Singh Grewal	68,682	47.54	▲15.74
INC	Sanjeev Talwar	32,760	22.67	▼10.36
SAD	Ranjit Singh Dhillon	20,369	14.1	▼17.6
BJP	Jagmohan Sharma	18,074	12.51	New
SAD(A)	Jaswant Singh Cheema	1,795	1.24	▲0.74
NOTA	None of the above	809	0.56	▼0.24
Majority		35,922	24.87	
Turnout		144,481		
Registered electors		217,819		
AAP gain from INC		Swing		

State Legislative Assembly
Preceded by -	Member of the Punjab Legislative Assembly from Ludhiana East Assembly constituency 2022 –	Incumbent
