= Hardeep Singh Mundian =

Indian politician

MLA, Punjab Legislative Assembly and Cabinet Minister Revenue, Rehabilitation and Disaster Management, Water Supply & Sanitation and Housing and Urban Development.
- Incumbent
- Assumed office 2022
- Constituency: Sahnewal
- Majority: Aam Aadmi Party

Personal details
- Party: Aam Aadmi Party

Hardeep Singh Mundian is an Indian politician and the MLA representing the Sahnewal Assembly constituency in the Punjab Legislative Assembly. He is a member of the Aam Aadmi Party. He was elected as the MLA in the 2022 Punjab Legislative Assembly election.

== MLA ==
The Aam Aadmi Party gained a strong 79% majority in the sixteenth Punjab Legislative Assembly by winning 92 out of 117 seats in the 2022 Punjab Legislative Assembly election. MP Bhagwant Mann was sworn in as Chief Minister on 16 March 2022.

Committee assignments of Punjab Legislative Assembly

- Member (2022–23) Committee on Petitions
- Member (2022–23) Committee on Agriculture and its allied activities

== Electoral performance ==
-->

Punjab Assembly election, 2022: Sahnewal
| Party | Candidate | Votes | % | ±% |
|---|---|---|---|---|
| AAP | Hardeep Singh Mundian | 61,515 | 34.50 | |
| INC | Vikram Singh Bajwa | 46,322 | 26.0 | |
| SAD | Sharanjit Singh Dhillon | 41,772 | 23.4 | |
| SAD(S) | Harpreet Singh Garcha | 12,134 | 6.8 | |
| SAD(A) | Amritpal Singh Chhandran | 10,899 | 6.1 | |
| NOTA | None of the above | 679 | 0.3 | |
| Majority | | 15,193 | 8.48 | |
| Turnout | | 179,196 | 67.5 | |
| Registered electors | | 265,382 | | |
| AAP gain from SAD | | Swing | | |

State Legislative Assembly
| Preceded by - | Member of the Punjab Legislative Assembly from Sahnewal Assembly constituency 2022 – | Incumbent |
