= Samrala =

- Municipal Council
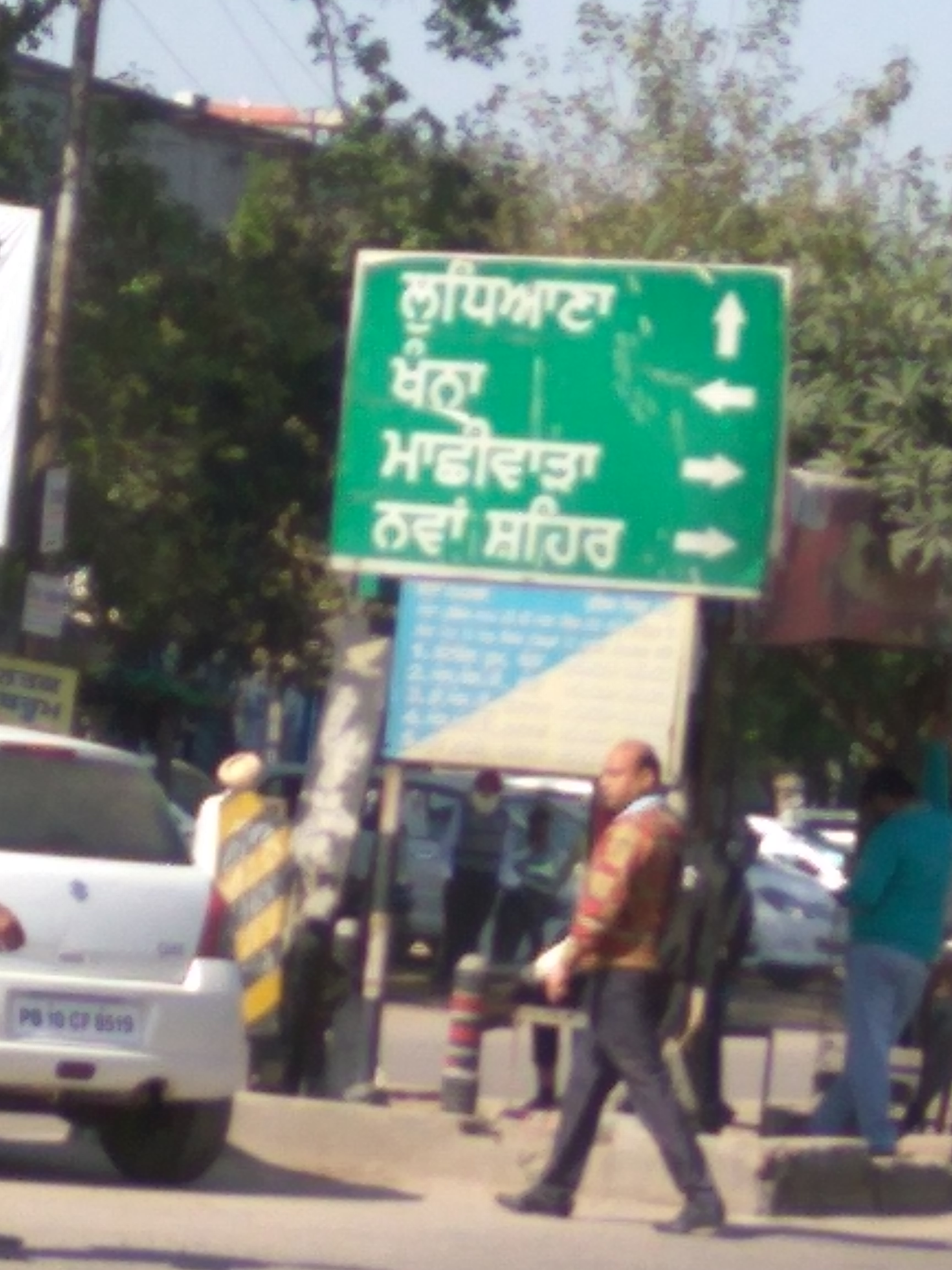
- Main Chowk Samrala

- Location in Punjab, India
- Coordinates: 30.84°N 76.19°E
- Country: India
- State: Punjab
- District: Ludhiana
- Elevation: 249 m (817 ft)

Population (2011)
  - Total: 40,000

Languages
  - Official: Punjabi
  - Native: Puadhi
- Time zone: UTC+5:30 (IST)
- Postal code: 141114
- Area code: 01628
- Vehicle registration: PB 43

Samrala is a city and a municipal council in Ludhiana district in the Indian state of Punjab. It is about 35 km east of the district headquarters Ludhiana, on the highway to Chandigarh. Samrala is a Class III Municipality. It is also known for the oldest tehsil situated in this city. It is also believed that the name Samrala came from the name of two brothers Sama and Rala.

== Geography ==
Samrala is located at 30.84°N 76.19°E. It has an average elevation of 249 metres (816 feet).

== Demographics ==
As of 2011 Samrala had population of 19,678 of which 10,375 were males while 9,303 were females as per report released by Census India 2011.

The population of children aged 0–6 was 2008 which was 10.20% of the population. The female sex ratio is of 897 against state average of 895. The child sex ratio in Samrala is 803 compared to Punjab state average of 846. The literacy rate of Samrala city is 83.70% higher than state average of 75.84%. In Samrala, male literacy is 87.28% while female literacy rate is 79.76%.

Samrala has substantial population of Schedule Caste. Schedule Caste constitutes 29.11% of total population in Samrala. Samrala currently doesn't have any Schedule Tribes.

The table below shows the population of different religious groups in Samrala city, as of 2011 census.

Population by religious groups in Samrala city, 2011 census
| Religion | Total | Female | Male |
|---|---|---|---|
| Hindu | 9,734 | 4,634 | 5,100 |
| Sikh | 9,401 | 4,457 | 4,944 |
| Muslim | 455 | 165 | 290 |
| Christian | 54 | 28 | 26 |
| Jain | 5 | 2 | 3 |
| Not stated | 29 | 17 | 12 |
| Total | 19,678 | 9,303 | 10,375 |

== Politics ==
The city is part of the Samrala Assembly Constituency.
