= Kapur Singh =

Indian civil servant and Sikh politician (1909–1986)

Sardar Kapur Singh
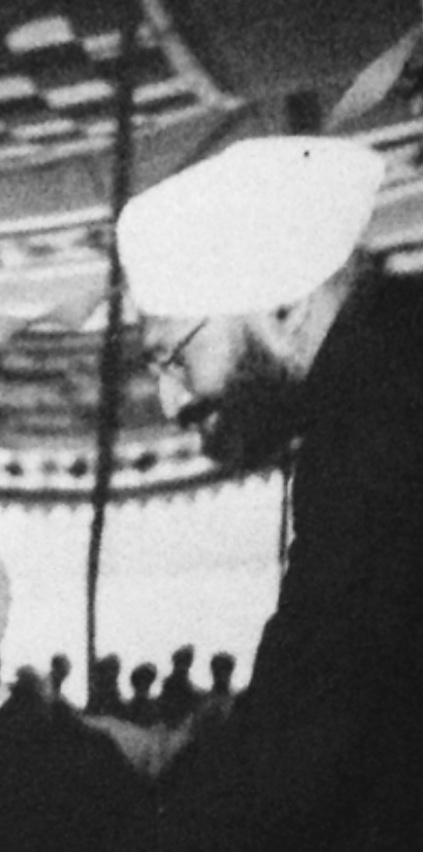
- Kapur Singh in 1964

Deputy Commissioner
- In office 1934–1948

Member of Parliament
- In office 1962–1967

Member of Legislative assembly
- In office 1969–1972

Personal details
- Born: 2 March 1909 lyallpur, Punjab
- Died: 13 August 1986 (aged 77) Jagron, Punjab, India
- Party: Akali Dal
- Relatives: Didar Singh (Father), Phuman Singh (Grandfather), Bhagat Singh (Uncle), Ganga Singh (Brother), Bishan Singh (Cousin), Karnail Singh (Cousin) Kishan Singh (Cousin) Bachan Singh (Cousin)
- Education: M.A (Punjab), M.A. (Cantub)
- Alma mater: Lyallpur Khalsa College
- Profession: Civil Service, Politician, Writer

Sardar Kapur Singh (1909–1986) was an Indian civil servant in Punjab and later a politician belonging to Shiromani Akali Dal. He was a Sikh intellectual and wrote about Sikh religion and politics. He was also the author of the Anandpur Sahib Resolution of the Akali Dal in 1973, demanding rights of Punjab and the Sikh community. Singh was proficient in multiple languages including English, Punjabi, Hindi, Persian, Arabic and Sanskrit.

== Early life ==
Kapur Singh was born in a Jat Sikh family in the village Chakk in the district of Layallpur (Faisalabad). He studied at Government College, Lahore obtaining a master's degree. Later, he went to study Moral Sciences at the Cambridge University. This was around the time of the Round Table Conferences in London. Choudhry Rahmat Ali, another student at Cambridge, was developing and canvassing the idea of "Pakistan", which at that time was envisaged to include the entire province of Punjab. Kapur Singh maintained cordial relations with Jinnah and other Muslim League leaders and, before Partition, acted as an interlocuter for the Sikhs.

== Career in Bureaucracy ==
Returning from the UK, Kapur Singh joined the Indian Civil Service (ICS) in 1933. He served in various administrative posts under the British Raj and, later, independent India until 1956. During his stint as a deputy commissioner of the Karnal district, he was accused of discrimination against Muslims. In 1948, Jawaharlal Nehru became aware of a magazine article written by Kapur Singh stating that the Khalsa would rise after the departure of the British and "rule everywhere".

Kapur Singh was suspended from the civil service in April 1949 with the governor's consent Chandulal Trivedi. Singh believed that the governor personally targeted him after he protested an official circular that was allegedly derogatory towards Sikhs. He was never reinstated after the suspension.

== Politics ==
On insistence of Akali Dal leaders, Kapur Singh joined the Akali politics. In 1962, he was elected to the Lok Sabha as a candidate of the Swatantra Party from the Ludhiana constituency. In 1969 Kapur Singh was elected to the Vidhan Sabha in the new Punjab state. He also remained the National Professor of Sikhism. His 6 September 1966 speech of Lok Sabha and Anadpur Sahib resolution of 1973 is magna carta of Sikhs demands and aspirations.

== Support of the Sikh Dharma Mission in the West ==
Kapur Singh made a significant and important contribution to the missionary work of Harbhajan Singh Khalsa outside of India. In April 1979, he went to Los Angeles, where he addressed the Khalsa Council of Sikh Dharma of the Western Hemisphere (later renamed "Sikh Dharma"). In his presentation, he assured the members of the administrative body that while their administrative titles and regalia might differ from contemporary SGPC practice, they fit in well with the overall arch of Sikh history which often was characterized by a diversity of flags among its constituent organizations or "missals." Bhai Sahib also referenced a prophecy of Guru Gobind Singh that Khalsa would rise in the West.

== Writings ==
Kapur Singh was a prolific writer. The books written in English by him include Parasaraprasna (a classic treatise on Sikhism, Published by Guru Nanak Dev University), The Sacred Writings of the Sikhs (a UNESCO publication), Me Judice (English Miscellany), Contributions of Guru Nanak, Sikhism for Modern Man, The Hour of Sword, Guru Arjan and Sukhmani, Some Insights into Sikhism, Sikhism an Oecumenical Religion. Hashish (poems in Punjabi), Saptsaring (Punjabi Biographies), Bahu Vistaar (Punjabi Essays), Pundrik (Punjabi Essays on culture and religion), Bikh meh Amrit (political essays and lectures in punjabi) and Mansur-al-Hallaj (Monograph of a Sufi saint in Punjabi), Sachi Sakhi (Memoirs in Punjabi)(1972 edition) (1979 edition). His works have also been published by Guru Nanak Dev University, Amritsar and Punjabi University, Patiala. He is also believed to have scripted the Anandpur Sahib Resolution 1973 of the Akali Dal. His SACHI SAKHI (memoirs) of 1979 is most read book on Punjab and Sikhs politics.

== Notes ==
Sources

- Gopal, S., ed. (1989), Selected Works of Jawaharlal Nehru, Second Series, Volume 8, Jawaharlal Nehru Memorial Fund/Oxford University Press – via archive.org
- Grewal, J. S. (2008). The New Cambridge History of India, Vol. II.3: The Sikhs of Punjab (Revised ed.). Cambridge University Press. ISBN 978-0-521-26884-4.
- Oberoi, Harjot (1996), "Sikh Fundamentalism: Translating History into Theory", in Martin E. Marty; R. Scott Appleby (eds.), Fundamentalisms and the State: Remaking Polities, Economies and Militance, University of Chicago Press, pp. 256–289, ISBN 0226508846 – via archive.org
- Singh, Gurharpal; Shani, Giorgio (2021). Sikh Nationalism. Cambridge University Press. ISBN 978-1-107-13654-0.
- Singh, Khushwant (2004), A History of the Sikhs: Volume 2: 1839-2004, Oxford University Press, ISBN 9780195673098
