= Satpal Gosain =

Indian politician (1935–2020)

Satpal Gosain (1935 – 2 December 2020) was an Indian politician, leader of Bharatiya Janata Party from Punjab, India. He was a member of the Punjab Legislative Assembly. Gosain had served as Deputy Speaker of the assembly two times from 2000 to 2002 and from 2007 to 2011 and a cabinet minister in Government of Punjab.
