= List of villages in Ludhiana East tehsil =

Ludhiana East Tehsil
- Tehsil
- Location in Punjab, India Ludhiana East Tehsil (India)
- Coordinates: 30.9004736°N 75.7866324°E
- Country: India
- State: Punjab
- District: Ludhiana

Languages
  - Official: Punjabi
- Time zone: UTC+5:30 (IST)
- Telephone code: 0161
- ISO 3166 code: IN-PB
- Vehicle registration: PB 91

Ludhiana East Tehsil has 181 villages and is in the Ludhiana district, Punjab India.

Particulars	Total	Male	Female
Total No. of Houses	407387		
Population	1,934,225	1,043,012	891,213

== A ==
- Assi Kalan

Back to top

== B ==
- Bahadurpur (Ludhiana East)
- Bajra (Ludhiana East)
- Balliawal (Ludhiana East)
- Barwala (Ludhiana East)
- Baura
- Bhagpur (Ludhiana East)
- Bhagwanpura (Ludhiana East)
- Bhaini Ala
- Bhaini Doaba
- Bhaini Gahi
- Bhaini Kima
- Bhaini Nathu
- Bhaini Salu
- Bhairo Munna
- Bhaman Kalan
- Bhaman Khurd
- Bhamian Khurd
- Bhoda
- Bholapur
- Bhukhri Kalan
- Bhukhri Khurd
- Bhupana
- Bhutta (Ludhiana East)
- Bilga (Ludhiana East)
- Bir Sahnewal
- Bool (Ludhiana East)
- Boont (Ludhiana East)
- Boothgarh (Ludhiana East)
- Boothgarh Jattan
- Bounker
- Budhewal
- Burj Mattewara
- Butahri

Back to top

== C ==
- Chak Sarwan Nath
- Chaunta
- Chhandaran
- Chuharwala
- Chupki

Back to top

== D ==
- Dehlon
- Dhanansu
- Dharaur
- Dheri (Ludhiana East)
- Dhoda (Ludhiana East)
- Dholanwal
- Dhoula

Back to top

== F ==
- Fatehgarh Gujjran (Ludhiana East)
- Fatehgarh Jattan

Back to top

== G ==
- Gadapur
- Gaddowal
- Garcha
- Garhi Fazil
- Garhi Sheru
- Gaunsgarh
- Gehlewal
- Ghawaddi
- Ghumait
- Ghumana
- Gobindgarh
- Gopalpur
- Gopalpur
- Gopalpur Bulandewal
- Gujjarwal Bet
- Guram

Back to top

== H ==
- Hadia
- Hadiwal
- Haidar Nagar
- Hawas
- Hayatpura
- Hiran

Back to top

== J ==
- Jagirpur
- Jamalpur Leli
- Jandiali
- Jarkhar
- Jartauli
- Jassar
- Jassowal
- Jhorran
- Jhugian Bega
- Jhugian Kadir
- Jiwanpur, Ludhiana
- Jodhewal
- Jagirpur
- Jamalpur Leli
- Jandiali
- Jarkhar
- Jartauli
- Jassar
- Jassowal
- Jhugian Bega
- Jhugian Kadir
- Jonewal

Back to top

== L ==
- Lakhowal
- Laton Dana
- Laton Joga
- Lehr* a

Back to top

== M ==
- Machhian Kalan
- Machhian Khurd
- Mahal Ghumana
- Majara
- Majri
- Mallewal
- Mand Chaunta
- Mangarh
- Mangat
- Mangli Kadar
- Mangli Khas
- Mangli Nichhi
- Mangli Tanda
- Mangli Unchhi
- Marewal
- Mattewara
- Meharban
- Mehlon
- Mehma Singhwala
- Miani
- Mianwal
- Mukandpur
- Mundian Khurd

Back to top

== N ==
- Nangal
- Nat
- Nurwala

Back to top

== P ==
- Paddi
- Paharuwal
- Panglian
- Panjeta
- Partapgarh
- Pawa
- Pirthipur
- Pohir

Back to top

== Q ==
- Kila Raipur

Back to top

== R ==
- Raian
- Raipur Bet
- Rajur
- Ramgarh
- Rangian
- Rattangarh
- Raur
- Rawat
- Rurka

Back to top

== S ==
- Sahnewal Khurd
- Salempur
- Salkiana
- Sangeh
- Sasrali
- Satiana
- Sattowal
- Saya Kalan
- Saya Khurd
- Shahabana
- Shankar
- Shekhewal
- Sherian
- Silon Kalan
- Silon Khurd
- Sirah
- Sujatwala

Back to top

== T ==
- Tajpur
- Tibba
- Togar

Back to top

== U ==
- Umedpur
- Uppal

Back to top

== W ==
- Walipur

Back to top
