= Bahadurpur =

Bahadurpur may refer to these places:

India

- Bahadurpur, Gujarat, a village in Bhavnagar district, Gujarat, India
- Bahadurpur (Ludhiana East), a village in Ludhiana district, Punjab, India
- Bahadurpur, Mainpuri, a village in Mainpuri district, Uttar Pradesh, India
- Bahadurpur, Nawanshahr, a village in Shaheed Bhagat Singh Nagar district/Nawanshahr district of Punjab, India
- Bahadurpur, Paschim Bardhaman, a village in Paschim Bardhaman district, West Bengal, India
- Bahadurpur, Raebareli, a village in Raebareli district, Uttar Pradesh, India
- Bahadurpur, Sangrur, a village in Sangrur district, Punjab, India
- Bahadurpur Rajoa, a village in Punjab, India
- Bahadurpur Assembly constituency, Darbhanga district, Bihar, India
- Bahadurpura Assembly constituency, Telangana, India

Others

- Bahadurpur, Bangladesh
- Bahadurpur, Sarlahi, Nepal
- Bahadurpur, Palpa, Nepal
- Bahadur Pur, Jalalpur Pirwala, Pakistan
- Bahadurpura, Punjab, Pakistan

== See also ==
- Bahadurganj (disambiguation)
