= Sikhs in the British Indian Army =

Component of the military of British India

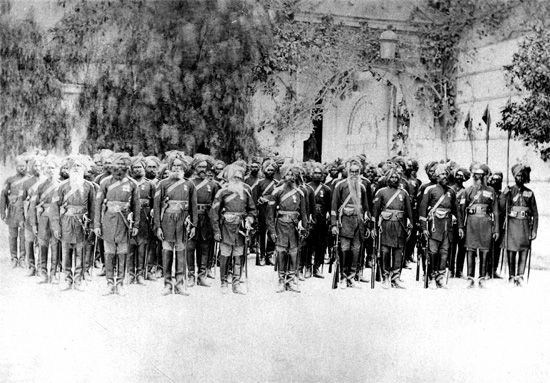
Photograph of veteran Sikh soldiers (sepoys) in the British Indian Army, Malta, ca.1870

Sikhs served in the British Indian Army throughout the British Raj. After the fall of the Sikh Empire and death of its king Maharaja Ranjit Singh, the British conquered this large territory with much difficulty as it was the last kingdom in India to be taken over by the British, and began recruiting Sikhs into their army in large numbers. Sikh units fought at the Battle of Saragarhi; in the First World War, as the "Black Lions", as well as during the Second World War in Malaya, Burma and Italy.

== 19th century ==
One of the earliest Sikh regiments of the British Indian Army was the Regiment of Ferozepur, also called the 14th Sikhs, formed in 1846. The Sikh Empire lost two wars against the British, leading to its annexation in 1849. After annexation of the Punjab in 1849, the British inherited the old Sikh Army, which consisted of 60,000 soldiers who were now out of work. Whilst this provided a possibility of recruiting these unemployed Sikh soldiers into the Bengal Army, the governor-general cautioned against doing-so as he was concerned about the Sikhs rising up in rebellion against the British once again, as had happen earlier in Multan in 1848. Governor-General Dalhousie adopted a policy of pacifying the Sikhs by demilitarizing them and confiscating their weapons in an effort to render them "submissive" and "harmless" so they could not resist nor have the materials for war:

Sikhs, a people warlike in character and long accustomed to conquest, must of necessity detest the British ... there will never be peace in the Punjab so long as its people are allowed to maintain the means and the opportunity of making war.

— Dalhousie, Despatch from Governor General (Gov. Gen.) to Secret Committee, 7 April 1849, in Papers Relating to Punjab, 1847-49, PP, 1849, Cmd. 1071, Vol. 41, p. 700.

Within six-weeks of the new British administration, the old Sikh Army was disbanded and 120,000 weapons (from matchlocks to daggers) were confiscated. A muster was held at Lahore, with 50,000 former Sikh soldiers being paid and disbanded. All former military establishments throughout the region, except those valued by the new British administration, were dismantled. However, these retired Sikh soldiers would return to their native villages, where they found few chances at employment. Already in 1849, it was thought to use Sikhs to help police the new border with hostile Pashtun tribal areas, which would help provide work to some of the unemployed Sikh soldiers, instead of relying upon levies and police battalions in these areas. In 1849, the Board of Administration raised 10 regiments of Punjabis to create the Punjab Irregular Frontier Force, with five regiments of infantry and five of cavalry. As a means of controlling against Sikh hostility, the new regiments were to be 50% Punjabis (mainly from the Pahari Hills region, such as Kangra, and Muslim Punjabis), 25% Sikh, and 25% Hindustani. However, in-practice the regiments were dominated by Hindustanis and Pathans proportionally, as Sikhs were still untrusted by the local commanders, meanwhile Muslim Punjabis and Dogra Rajputs refrained from joining the military service. In 1851, the restriction on recruitment of Punjabis into the Bengal Army was done-away with, however there remained a rule that Sikhs should not numerically pass 200 men per regiment (around 20% of the strength). Part of the push-back against Sikhs serving in the Bengal Army came from officers who were influenced by sepoys from upper-caste Hindu-backgrounds hailing from Oudh and Rohilkhand, who saw the lax-observance of the caste system amongst the Sikhs as "untidy and dirty", causing them to despise the Sikhs. Other military officers/commanders at the time did not like to recruit Sikhs from the old Khalsa Army because they viewed them as "insubordinate".

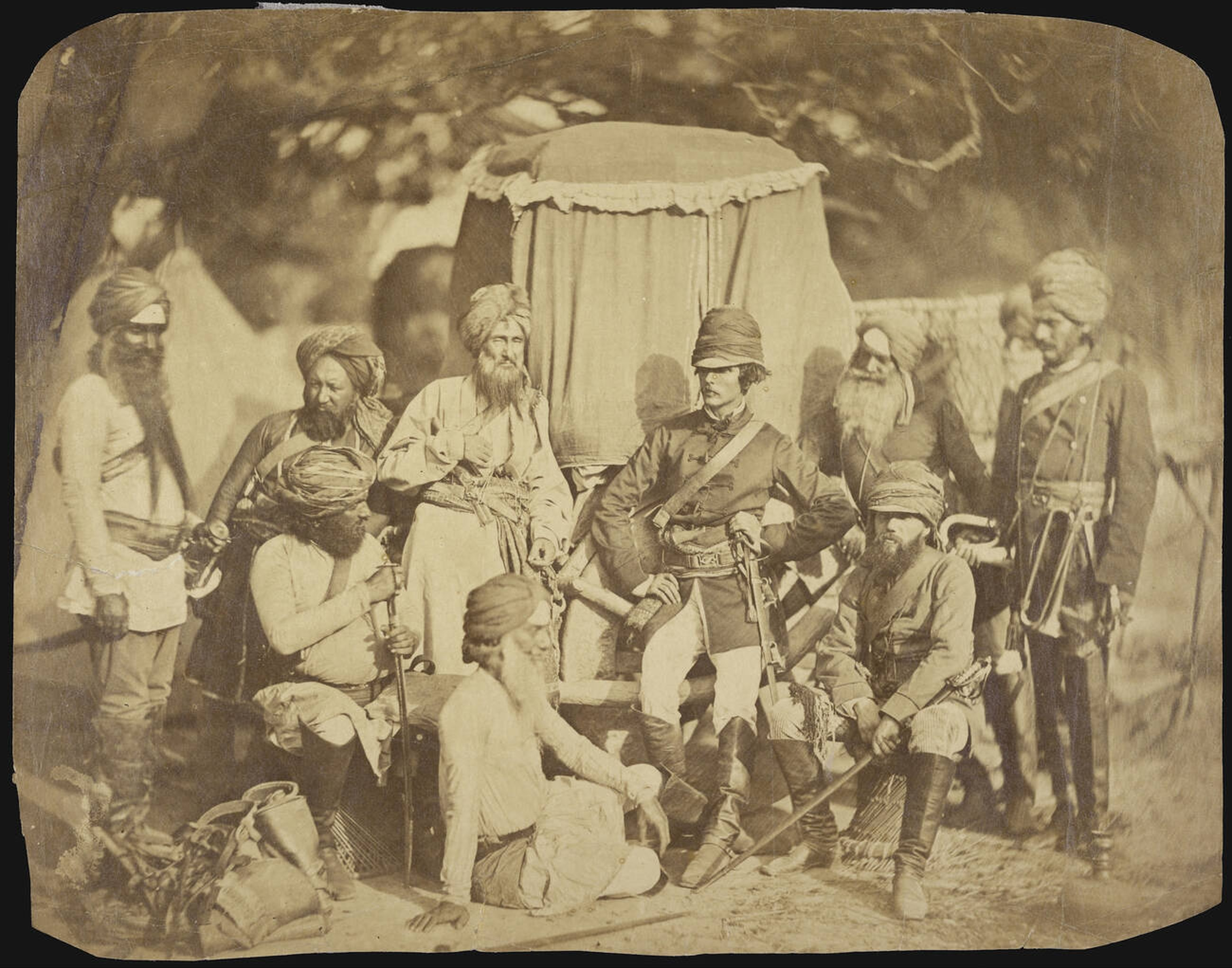
Sikh and British Officers of Hodson's Horse, 1858

The Sikhs mostly did not rebel against British-rule after their annexation, due to the memory of the losses in the Anglo-Sikh Wars being recent. The Sikh Regiment and Sikh-ruled princely states, such as Kapurthala and Patiala, supported the British during the Indian Rebellion of 1857. The British began to preferentially recruit Sikhs into its colonial military in the period after the Indian rebellion of 1857.

=== Battle of Saragarhi ===
The Battle of Saragarhi is considered one of the great battles in Sikh military history. On 12 September 1897 a contingent of twenty-one soldiers from the 36th Sikhs regiment (now the 4th Battalion of the Sikh Regiment of Indian Army), led by Havildar Ishar Singh held off an Afghan attack of 10,000 men for several hours. All 21 Sikh soldiers chose to fight to the death instead of surrendering. In recognition of their sacrifice, the British Parliament paid them respect, and each one of them was awarded the Indian Order of Merit (equivalent to the Victoria Cross).

== World War I ==
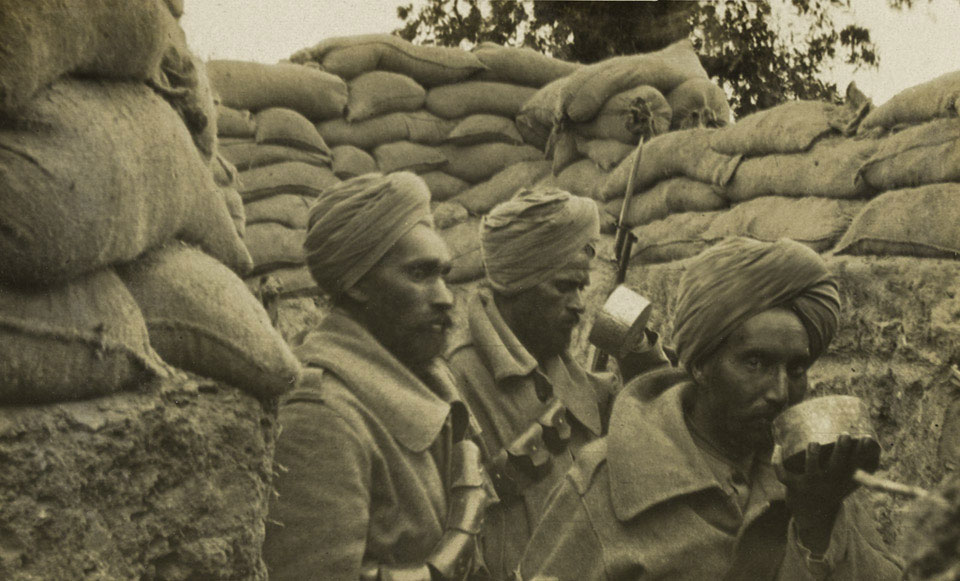
Indian soldiers in trench, Gallipoli, 1915

Known afterwards as the Lions of the Great War, during the war they were often called the Black Lions. Sikhs were allowed to use traditional Sikh weapons such as chakrams and talwar swords, and it was not uncommon to see the Sikh Holy Scriptures; The 11th Sikh Guru, Sri Guru Granth Sahib Ji, being carried before a marching Sikh battalion or even on the front lines among the battling Sikh troops.

== World War II ==
=== Battle of Malaya ===
The strength of the army in Malaya was 104,625 troops. Sikhs represented more than 60 percent of the total Indian force that fought against the Japanese invasion of Malaysia and Singapore.

=== Burma Campaign ===
Sikhs served with distinction in repelling the attempted invasion of India by the Japanese, and subsequently in dislodging them from Burma (now Myanmar).

=== Italian Campaign ===
Sikhs served with distinction during the Allied invasion of Italy.

== In popular culture ==
- Diljit Dosanjh stars as the main protagonist in Punjabi-language Sajjan Singh Rangroot, which takes place in the British Raj and follows his journey of serving in the British Indian Army in WWI.
- Guspy Aujla and Dev Dhillon released Punjabi song "Sher Soorma" which highlights SIkh bravery in the World Wars
- In the 2019 movie 1917, Nabhaan Rizwan plays Sepoy Jondalar, a Sikh soldier in the Indian Army.
- In the 1996 movie The English Patient, Naveen Andrews plays Kirpal (Kip) Singh, a Sikh soldier who is a sapper, or bomb disposal expert, and works for the British Army in World War II. Kip is from Punjab, India, and volunteers for the British military under Lord Suffolk.
- BBC aired a program highlighting Sikh's contributions to both World Wars, titled "Rememberence - The Sikh Story", featuring Mohinder Singh Pujji.
- In the 2019 movie Kesari, Akshay Kumar plays Havildar Ishar Singh, a Sikh soldier who led an army of 21 Sikhs fought against 10,000 Afghans in 1897 at the Battle of Saragarhi.

== Gallery ==
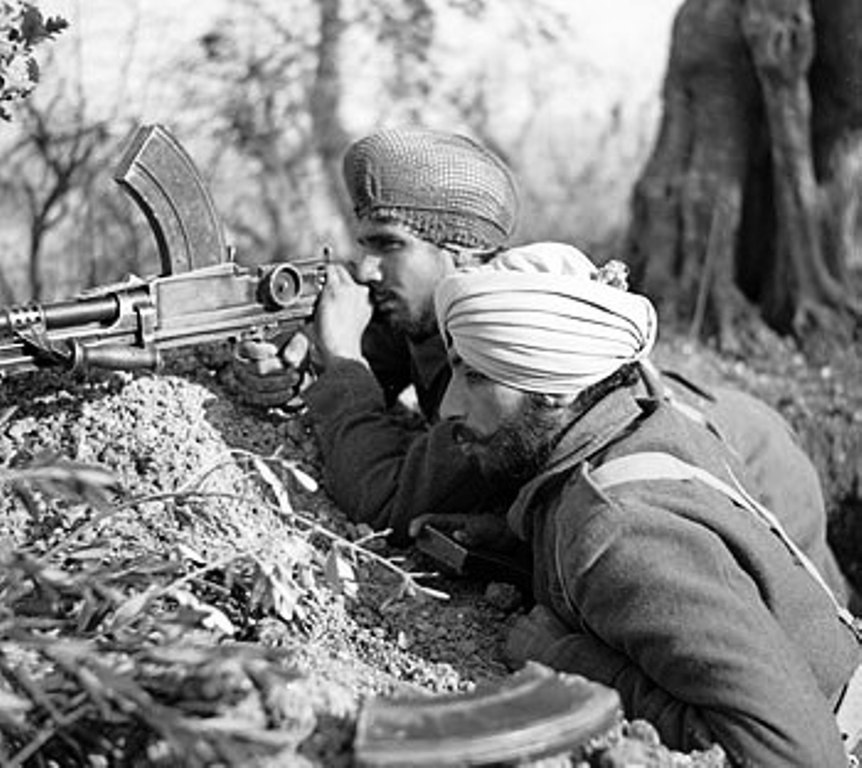
Indian Sikh soldiers in Italian campaign.

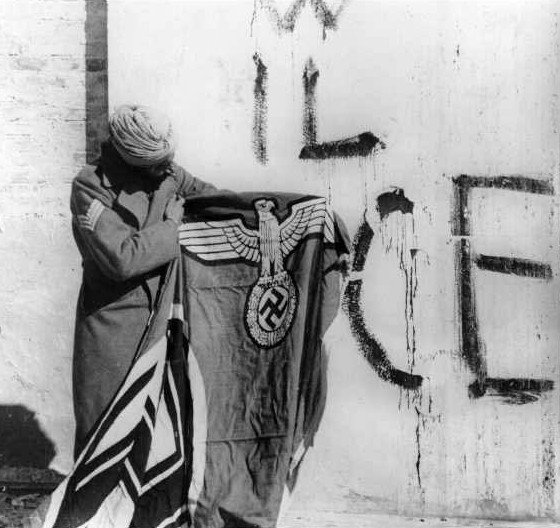
Sikh soldier with captured Swastika flag

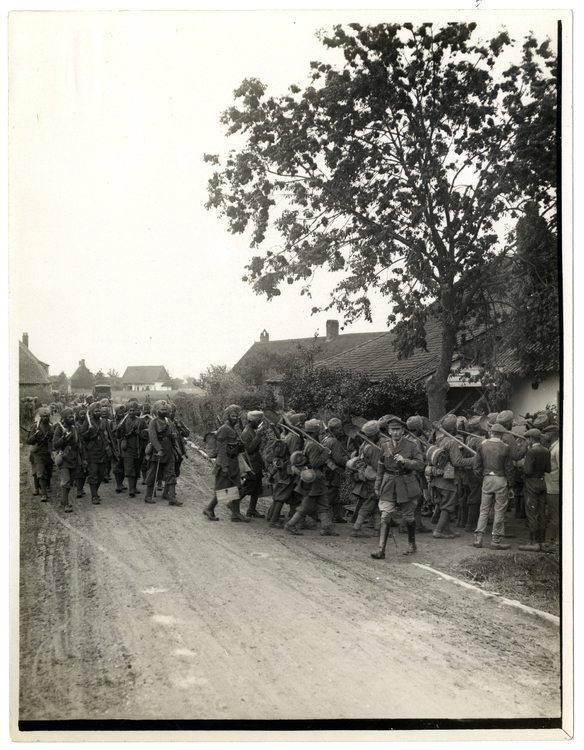
A company of 15th Sikhs at Le Sart, France 1915

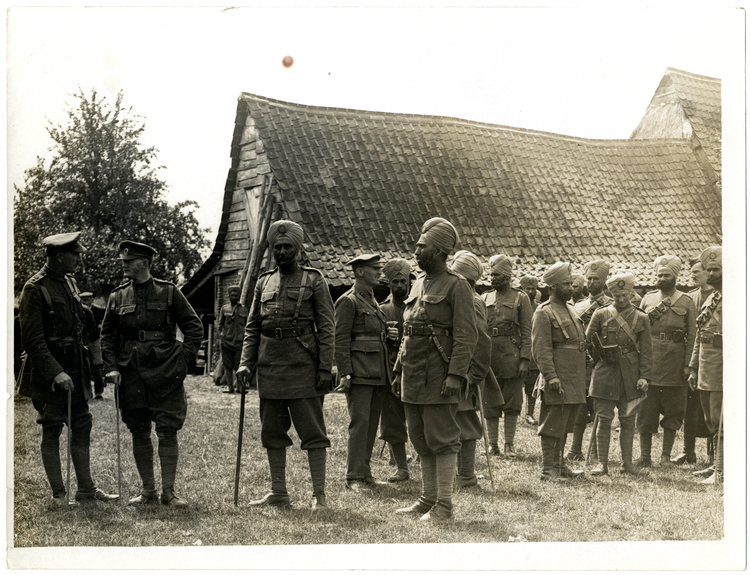
A company of 15th Sikhs at Le Sart, France 1915

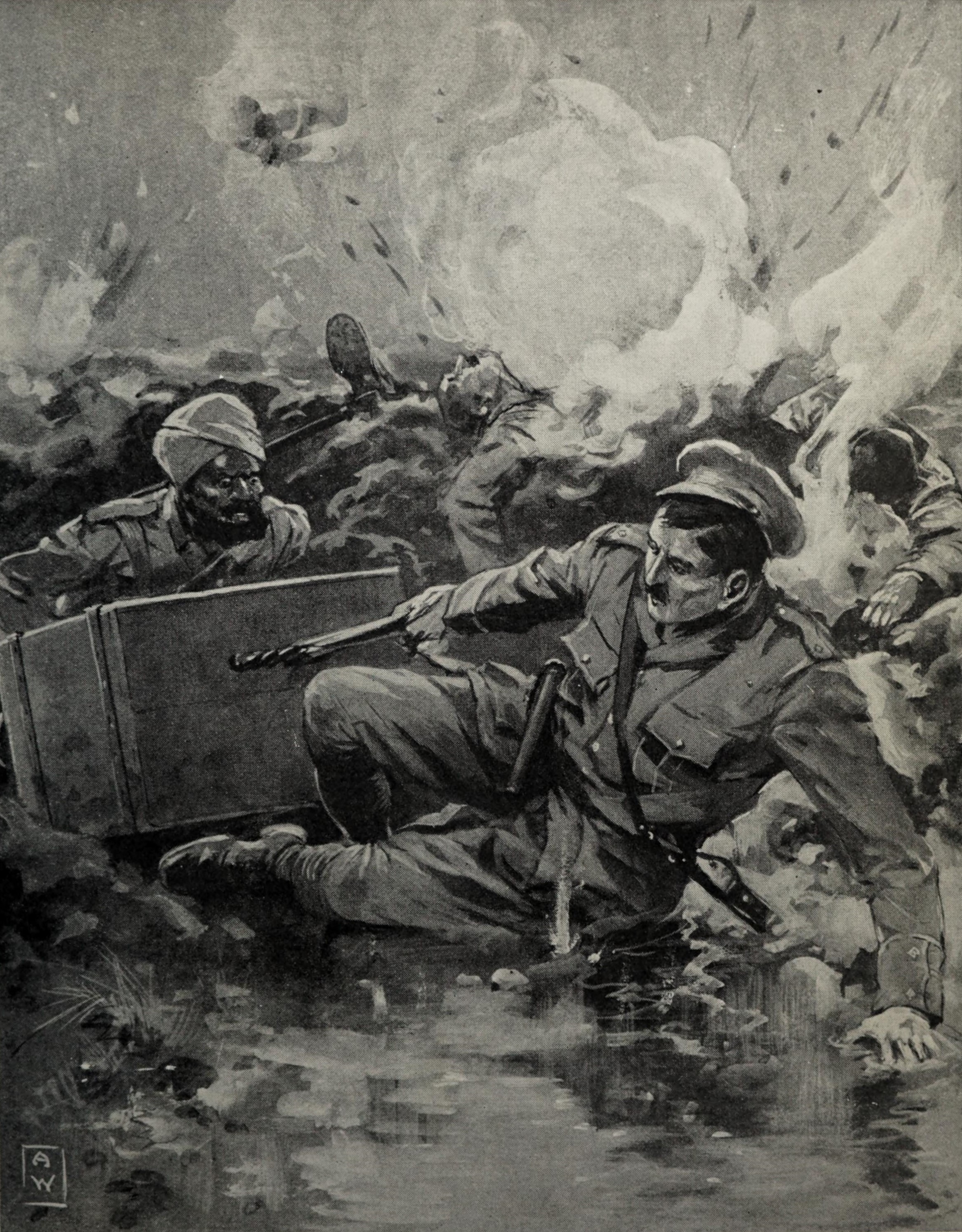
John George Smyth VC drawing

== See also ==
- Indian Army during World War I
- Punjab registers
