= Bajra =

Bajra may refer to:

- Bajra (Ludhiana East), Punjab, India
- Bajra, Pakistan, in Punjab province
- The name in Indian languages for pearl millet

== See also ==
- Vajira (disambiguation)
