= Ranbir Sidhu =

Canadian contemporary artist

- Born: 1982 (age 43–44); Maidenhead, England
- Education: Self-taught
- Known for: Sculpture
- Notable work: Asteroid 3033 X1, Odyssey, Fortress of Memory
- Website: www.ranbir-sidhu.com

Ranbir Sidhu is a Canadian contemporary artist and sculptor based in Toronto. He creates large-scale sculptures using materials such as stainless steel and marble, and has produced custom pieces for clients including musician Drake and Roc Nation. Sidhu's museum debut, the exhibition No Limits, opened at the Art Gallery of Ontario (AGO) in December 2025.

== Early life ==
Sidhu was born in 1982 in Maidenhead, England, and raised in Scarborough, Toronto. He is a self-taught artist who grew up around manufacturing environments, as his family owned a metal fabrication shop. His father installed an architectural drafting table in his childhood bedroom to encourage drawing. Sidhu's Sikh heritage influences his work.

== Career ==
In 2015, Sidhu founded Futurezona, a studio focused on art and custom sculptures. His process involves sketching ideas, 3D modeling, engineering, and collaboration with fabricators to realize complex forms. He works with industrial materials like stainless steel - often mirror-polished to reflect light and viewers - and others including aluminum, gold, marble, niobium, and crystal. Sidhu has created bespoke pieces for high-profile clients, such as an OVO-branded work for Drake and pieces for Roc Nation.

== Artistic practice ==
Sidhu's sculptures reflect influences from post-war abstraction and artists including Constantin Brâncuși and Barbara Hepworth, using monumental scale to create stillness and power. His works are characterized by the interplay of reflective surfaces and light, with mirror-polished stainless steel often used to reflect both light and viewers.

== Exhibitions ==
Sidhu's first solo museum exhibition, Ranbir Sidhu: No Limits, opened at the Art Gallery of Ontario on December 11, 2025, and continues until January 3, 2027. Curated by Julian Cox, AGO Deputy Director and Chief Curator, the show includes three monumental sculptures created for the exhibition:

- Asteroid 3033 X1 (2025), a crystalline structure approximately 10 meters long, clad in nearly 500 etched metal panels with internal LED lighting, fibre optics, and a soundscape blending traditional and electronic elements.
- Odyssey (2025), over 100 stainless-steel spires (some gold-plated) weighing more than 2,000 kg, refracting light to evoke sacred architecture and communal reflection.
- Fortress of Memory (2025), 21 steel sculptures on marble bases commemorating the 21 Sikh soldiers who died in the 1897 Battle of Saragarhi, arranged to form a Dastar Bunga (towering fortress) turban shape in low light.

The works integrate Sikh historical and metaphysical references with futuristic aesthetics.
