= Bahadurganj =

Bahadurganj may refer to:

- Bahadurganj, Ghazipur, a municipality in Uttar Pradesh, India
- Bahadurganj, Kishanganj, a town in Bihar, India
  - Bahadurganj Assembly constituency
- Bahadurganj, Kapilvastu, a village development committee in Nepal

== See also ==
- Bahadurpur (disambiguation)
