= Bahadurpur, Nepal =

Bahadurpur, Nepal may refer to:

- Bahadurpur, Palpa
- Bahadurpur, Sarlahi
