= Lal Chand (athlete) =

Indian long-distance runner

Personal information
- Full name: Lal Chand Nil
- Nationality: Indian
- Born: 19 July 1928 Bahadurpur, Gujarat, British India

Sport
- Sport: Long-distance running
- Event: Marathon

Lal Chand (born 19 July 1928) is an Indian long-distance runner. He competed in the marathon at the 1960 Summer Olympics.
