= Bhamian Khurd =

- Urban Area
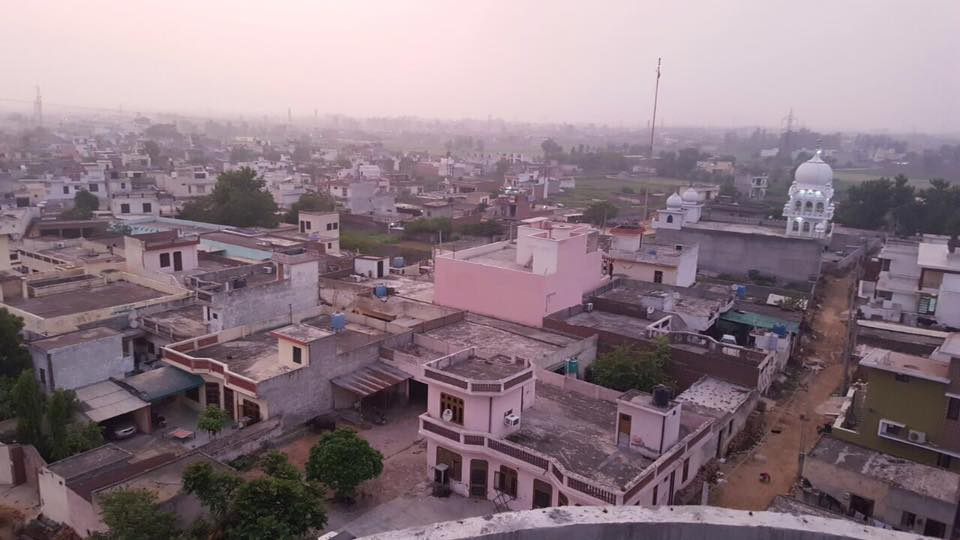

- Location in Punjab, India Bhamian Khurd (India)
- Coordinates: 30.9131°N 75.9260°E
- Country: India
- State: Punjab
- District: Ludhiana

Languages
  - Official: Punjabi
- Time zone: UTC+5:30 (IST)
- PIN: 141010
- Vehicle registration: PB-91
- Avg. summer temperature: 35 °C (95 °F)
- Avg. winter temperature: 10 °C (50 °F)

Bhamian Khurd is a village turned urban area of Ludhiana in the state of Punjab. It is located 16 km east of the sub-district headquarters Ludhiana and 16 km from the district headquarters Ludhiana. According to the 2009 statistics, Shankar Colony serves as the gram panchayat of Bhamian Khurd village. The village is 97 km from the state capital Chandigarh.

== Geographical Area ==
The total geographical area of village is 216 hectares. Bhamian Khurd has a total population of 8,222 peoples. There are about 1,706 houses in Bhamian Khurd village. Ludhiana is nearest town to Bhamian Khurd.

== Population of Bhamian Khurd ==
Total Population	Male Population	Female Population
8,222	4,396	3,827

== Connectivity of Bhamian Khurd ==
Type	Status
Public Bus Service	Available within 5 km distance
Private Bus Service	Available within village
Railway Station	Available within 10+km distance

== Nearby villages ==
- Bhamian Kalan
- Mundian Kalan
- Mundian Khurd
- Sahabana
- Tajpur
- Kakka
- Dhoula
- Jamalpur
- Kuliawal
- Ram Nagar
- New Sunder Nagar
- GTB Nagar
- Jamalpur
- Kunal Colony
- Balaji Enclave
