= Vajira =

Vajira may refer to:

- Vajira (Buddhist nun), mentioned in the Samyutta Nikaya
- Vajira Hospital, in Bangkok, Thailand
- Princess Vajira, empress of the Magadha Empire c. 492 – c. 460 BCE; consort of emperor Ajatashatru
- Sister Vajirā, a Buddhist ten precept-holder nun in Sri Lanka

== See also ==
- Vajra, the weapon of Indra in Indian religions
- Bajra (disambiguation)
