= Khalsa Bahadur =

1915 epic poem by Chuhar Singh

Khalsa Bahadur is an epic poem written by Chuhar Singh describing the chivalry and sacrifice of Sikh soldiers at the Battle of Saragarhi. The poem is 55 pages long, written using the baint verse form, and written in the Punjabi language. It was completed on November 13, 1915, at Ballial in the Patiala district of Punjab (India) using information from Sikh soldiers on leave.

== Synopsis ==
The poem begins with a supplication to God, the Sikh Gurus and the Sikh holy book, the Guru Granth Sahib. It narrates the raising of the 36th Sikh Regiment and details the Pathan tribes in the Northwest Frontier Province. It then tells the narrative of the Battle of Saragarhi and ends by describing monuments erected in their honor at Saragarhi, Amritsar, and Firozpur.

== See also ==
- Ajj Aakhaan Waris Shah Nu, Punjabi-language poem written by Amrita Pritam
