= Punjab registers =

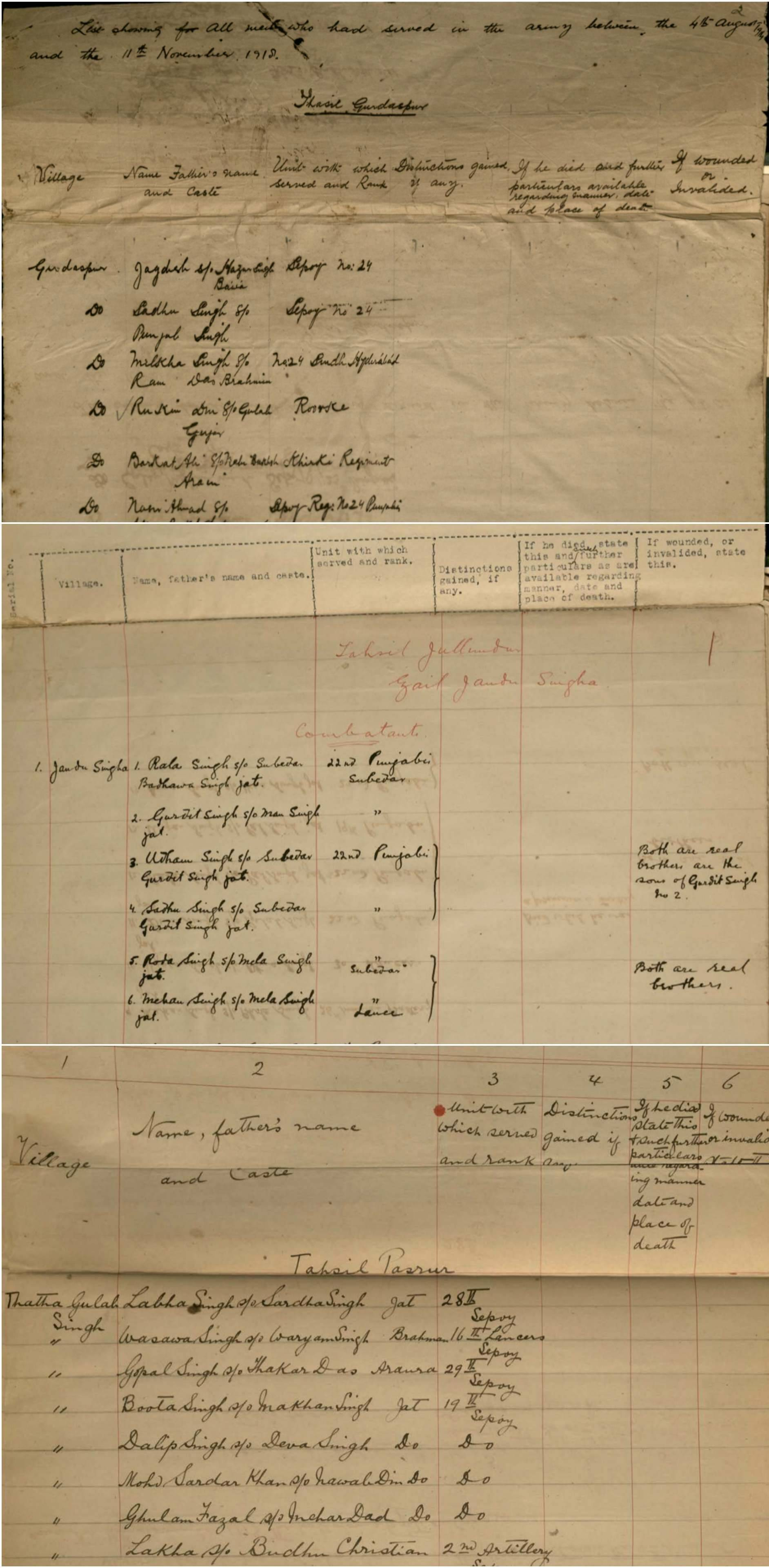
Sample pages from the Punjab Registers, c. 1919–1920

The Punjab registers are a collection of 25,000–26,000-pages worth of documents first compiled in circa 1919–1920 that document around 320,000 out of around 500,000 Punjabi soldiers who fought for the British in World War One, and also other contemporary conflicts immediately after WW1, such as the Third Anglo-Afghan War and the Waziristan campaign. (Note: 'Punjab' here refers to the Punjab Province of British India, including modern-day Indian and Pakistani Punjab, as well as Himachal Pradesh. and much of Haryana, but excluding the ‘Princely States’ - most notably Patiala, Kapurthala, Jind, and Nabha states.) Around 15,000 of these Punjabi soldiers died in WW1, with 8,000 of them being Sikhs. The documents have been raised as being supplemental material to correct the historical narrative on the contributions of colonial Punjabis to the British war cause and their sacrifices, in-order to create a more inclusive, equitable understanding. It has been suggested that data from the Punjab registers may be used to complement the Commonwealth War Graves Commission (CWGC) data on Indian Army casualties. Much of the information contained in the Punjab registers is missing from the CWGC data. Surviving records found in British and South Asian archives can compliment both the Punjab registers' and CWGC's data to form a more complete understanding of the contribution of Indian soldiers in the First World War. The records cover Sikh, Hindu, Muslim and Christian soldiers soldiers who originated from villages now located in the present-day administrative areas of Indian Punjab, Haryana, Himachal Pradesh, and Pakistani Punjab.

According to Amandeep Singh Madra, five percent of the British military force in WW1 were Punjabi soldiers, with Punjabis contributing a third of the Indian Army at the time and fifty-percent of combatants despite making-up eight-percent of the Indian population. Punjab was the main recruiting-ground for the British in India during the First World War, with volunteer-rates in some Punjabi villages reaching 40%. Whilst the records cover Punjabi soldiers from areas under direct-British-rule, they do not cover the Punjabi soldiers who participated in the war as part of the forces of the princely states of Patiala, Jind, Nabha, or Kapurthala. It is unknown if similar registers exist for the princely states' soldiers. Heaviest recruitment during the war was from the Rawalpindi, Jalandhar, and Hoshiarpur districts of British Punjab. It is unknown if similar records/registers exist for Punjabi soldiers who participated in the Second World War.

== Compilation ==
The records were compiled by the District Soldiers Boards, under the direction of the Punjab Soldiers’ Board, itself a provincial branch of the Indian Soldiers’ Board. The boards' mission had evolved at this point from wartime recruitment to information disseminators, welfare provision overseers, and resolution disputers to assist with the resettlement of demobilized soldiers. Their mission became increasingly paramount with the increasingly anti-colonial agitations in rural Punjab from 1920 onwards. The records are organized by district, sub-district (tehsil), and village, containing the information on Punjabi personnel who participated in the First World War. Information on each individual soldier includes the following: native village, name, father's name, caste; regiment, distinctions, casualty information, and pensions. It is believed the registers were originally compiled in Urdu at tehsil-level and then reproduced at district-level in English. The records were both handwritten and typed. The records cover twenty-eight districts (other sources state the records cover twenty districts) of British Punjab, such as Ferozepur, Hoshiarpur, Jalandhar, Jhelum, Rawalpindi, and Rhotak districts. (Note: Many districts of the former Punjab Province of British India have since ceased to exist or cut-up to form new districts. For example, the former Ferozepore district has been split over the years to create the following districts of Firozpur, Faridkot (1972), and Moga (1995).) The records also prove the contribution of members of various castes in the British war-effort aside from the dominant castes, including artisan castes (such as weavers, goldsmiths, and carpenters) and Dalits.

== Discovery and digitization ==
The records, consisting of 40 volumes (another source state they consist of 34 volumes) in total were discovered deep inside the Lahore Museum's basement in Pakistan by the United Kingdom Punjab Heritage Association (UKPHA) and the transcription, digitization, and mapping effort is being carried-out by the UKPHA in-association with the University of Greenwich. The University of Greenwich provided funding for the project and helped with their transcribing. An Indian map expert from Oxford University helped with the mapping, as the district boundaries of modern Punjabi districts can differ greatly from the district boundaries of British Punjab. According to Bashir Bhatti, head of the Lahore Museum Research and Reference Library, the museum first catalogued the records in 1977 but they do not know how the records came to be stored in the museum. Amandeep Singh Madra of the UKPHA spent seven years communicating with the Lahore Museum beginning in 2014 before he could gain access to the registers. He was initially sent sample pages of the registers by the museum in 2019, where he noticed the records are ordered by village, where he realized their genealogical and historiographical potential. He was initially informed about the existence of the records by Indian historians, who could not access them themselves.

Digitized records are available for free access at www.PunjabWW1.com, but only records from three historical districts have been made available publicly as of now: Jalandhar, Ludhiana, and Sialkot as part of Phase I of the website, with 44,000–45,000 soldiers' records being made available in the first phase. After the success of phrase one, further phases of the website will add records from the other twenty-five districts and 275,000 soldiers. The second-phase is planned to cover the Amritsar and Hoshiarpur districts. By July 2026, more than 20,000 additional names for commemoration have been discovered due to the records, with the names of 9,909 British Indian Army servicemen being added to the Commonwealth War Graves Commission, the largest update to its records since the Second World War. An event titled Punjab Registers: Sharing the Stories for Evermore on the records was held at Manchester Museum on 15 July 2026.

== Demographics ==
Of the 9,909 recovered soldier records added to the CWGC database, 2,480 (25%) were Sikhs, 2,540 (26%) were Hindus, 4,020 (41%) were Muslims, around 80 (under 1%) were Christians, with the religious background of the remaining 8% still under review. Most of them died due to combat injuries, illnesses, or pandemic influenza rather than on the front lines.

== See also ==
- Sikhs in the British Indian Army
