= Bahadurpur, Sangrur =

Coordinates: 30.23°N 75.83°E

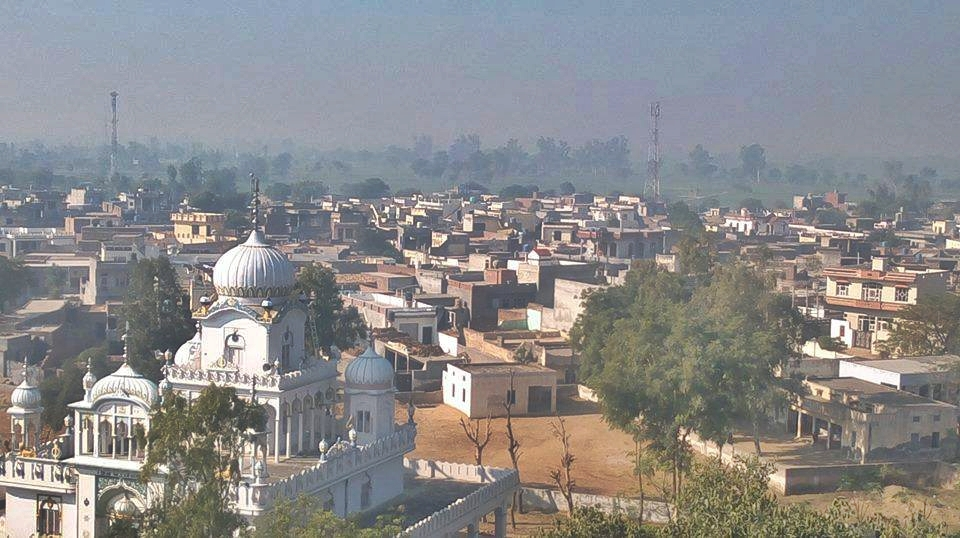
aerial view of Bahadurpur

Bahadurpur is a village in the Sangrur District of the Indian state of Punjab. It is located at 4 km from the holy site of Mastuana Sahib, 10 km from Sangrur, 32 km from Barnala, on Sangrur-Barnala main road. It has a population of 8,367, according to the 2011 census.

It is part of the Sunam assembly constituency and the Sangrur parliamentary seat. Its neighbouring villages are Duggan, Badrukhan, Bhaini Mehraj, Natt, Kunran, Badbar and Bhammabadi. This is the village of jind riyast Raja sher Singh whose 4th generation presently live in village .

== Demographics ==
The majority of the residents are Jatt (Sikh) of Khaira's Gotra. There is also majority of Muslims, Bania (mahajan), Brahmins, saini's, Tarkhaan (Ramgarhia), Nai, Mehra and Dalit. This secular village supports Gurdwara Sahib, Mandirs and mosques.

== Economy ==
Agriculture is the main occupation of majority population of village . Around 5% peoples are employed in Mastuana Sahib. Many of people in army, teacher and in other Profession.

== Climate ==
Bahadurpur's climate offers extreme hot and cold conditions. Annual temperature in Bahadurpur ranges from 1 °C to 46 °C (min/max), but can reach 49 °C in summer and 0 °C in winter. The northeast area receives heavy rainfall, while further south and west experiences greater rainfall and higher temperatures. Average annual rainfall ranges around 460 mm.

Bahadurpur has three seasons:

- Summer (February to May)
- Monsoon (June to September), the rainy season
- Winter (October to January), when temperatures typically fall as low as 0 °C

== Schools ==
- Primary schools
- Akal Senior Secondary School

== Banking ==
A branch of Oriental Bank of Commerce operates there. A cooperative bank serves Bahadurpur, Duggan and Kunran villages.

== Religious Shrines ==
- Gurudwara Akal Bunga Sahib
- Baba Mann Dass Mandir
- Jamna Wala Dera
- Sati Mai
- Masjid
