= Jagat Singh Binjal =

Indian revolutionary (1893–1915)

- ਜਗਤ ਸਿੰਘ ਬਿੰਜਲ
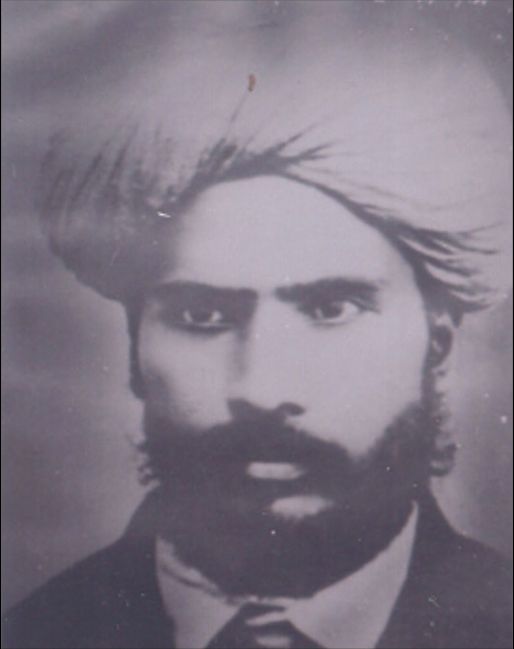
- Born: 1893; Binjal, Punjab Province, British India (present-day Punjab, India)
- Died: 25 March 1915 (aged 21–22)
- Cause of death: Execution by hanging
- Occupation: Revolutionary
- Employer: Ghadar Party
- Movement: Indian independence movement
- Parents: Sada Singh (father); Kishan Kaur (mother)

Jagat Singh Binjal (1893 – 25 March 1915) was a Ghadar party revolutionary born in Binjal village of Ludhiana.

== Early life ==
Jagat Singh Binjal was born to Sada Singh, a peasant and Kishan Kaur, a housemaker in 1893 in Binjal, British India.

== Revolutionary activities ==
On November 26, 1914, sixty Ghadar Party members gathered outside the Ferozepur Cantonment. However, Kartar Singh Sarabha informed them that British authorities had got wind of their plan. The plan was abandoned, and the Ghadarites dispersed. On their way back to Moga, a police party in Ghal Kalan Village intercepted Jagat Singh and other Ghadarites. In the ensuing clash, Bisharat Ali, a police sub-inspector, and Jawala Singh, a Zaildar were killed. The Villagers mistook them for thieves and surrounded them. They ran towards the nearby bushes to hide. Police set on fire the entire area trapping them leading to their arrest. On February 2, 1915, he was tried by Ferozepur Session Judge under sections 149, 302 (for murder of Bisharat Ali), 114, 307, 402, and 399. The judge noted that there were seven charges against him. On 25 March 1915, Jagat Singh was hanged in the Montgomery Jail, along with Bakhshish Singh and Lal Singh. The British did not allow family members to meet him for the last time. He was either buried inside the jail or his death was never revealed to his family members.
