= Ishar Singh (Indian Army soldier, born 1858) =

Recipient of the Indian Order of Merit

Havildar Ishar Singh IOM, IDSM
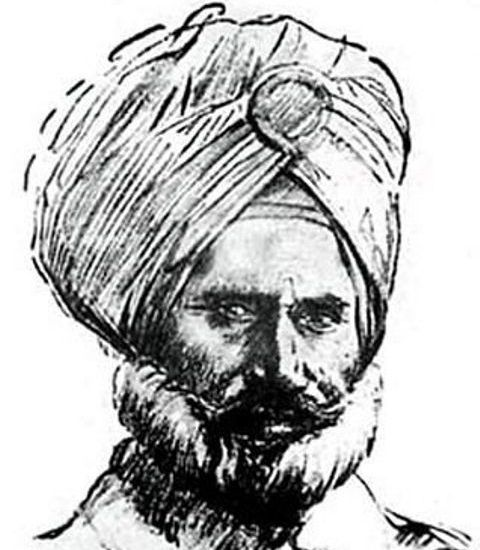
- A sketch of Havildar Ishar Singh
- Born: Ishar Singh; 1858; Jhorran, Ludhiana district, Punjab Province, British India
- Died: 12 September 1897 (aged 38–39); Saragarhi Fort, Kohat district, Punjab Province, British India
- Spouse: Jiwani Kaur (m. 1893–1897)
- Relatives: Sardar Dulla Singh (father)
- Military career
- Allegiance: British India
- Branch: British Indian Army
- Service years: 1876–1897
- Rank: Havildar
- Units: 36th Sikhs (now 4th Battalion of the Sikh Regiment)
- Commands: 36th Sikhs (now 4th Battalion of the Sikh Regiment)
- Conflicts: Tirah Campaign; Battle of Saragarhi †
- Awards: Indian Order of Merit (First Class)

Havildar Ishar Singh, IOM, IDSM (1858 – 12 September 1897), was an Indian soldier and war hero of the 36th Sikhs. He was known leading the regiment on a last stand against the 10,000-12,000 strong Pashtun tribesmen with only 20 other men at the Battle of Saragarhi. After sustaining enough resistance, Singh was fighting alone but refused to surrender and fought to the death along with the rest.

== Early military career ==
He was born in 1858, at the village of Jhorran (near Jagraon) in the Ludhiana district of Punjab, of British India (now Punjab, India) to an agrarian Jat Sikh family of Sardar Dulla Singh. Singh had an aspiration for becoming a soldier and when he turned 18, he joined the Punjab Frontier Force. He was initially assigned to Regiment No. 165 of the Regiment before being drafted in the 36th Sikhs Regiment in 1887. Major General James Lunt described him as:

Ishar Singh was a somewhat turbulent character whose independent nature had brought him more than once into support with his military superiors. Thus Ishar Singh — in camp, a nuisance, in field, magnificent.

== Battle of Saragarhi ==
Despite initial British success within the Samana Range in British India, the Pashtuns continued to harass the British forces. Near the area stood Fort Lockhart and Fort Gulistan but the two forts were not visible to each other due to the mountainous terrain. As a result, the Saragarhi outpost was established to provide easier communications between the two forts, but after the Pashtuns allied with the Afridis, the outpost became endangered from local uprisings which combined to a force of 10,000 to 12,000.

By this point, Singh was in his late 30s, given full command of Saragarhi with its small garrison consisting of 2 other NCOs and 18 soldiers, and was married but had no children. All 21 men including Singh fought to the death. With no water or food, the Sikhs fought for eight hours, managing to kill 400-500 men, each Sikh killing at least 20 Afghans before they all were killed in the battle (nevertheless, the casualty rate between the Indian soldiers and the Pasthun tribals remained 20:1, as compared to the strength on both sides).

== Legacy ==
In recognition of their supreme sacrifice, the British Parliament rose to pay them respect, and each one of them was posthumously awarded the Indian Order of Merit (First Class).

The service of the 36th Sikhs has been memorialized by the Sikhs as the day of the battle, September 12. It is celebrated as "Saragarhi Day".

Singh was portrayed by Akshay Kumar in the 2019 film Kesari. He was also portrayed by Randeep Hooda for the book cover of The 36th Sikhs in the Tirah Campaign 1897-98 – Saragarhi and the defence of the Samana forts by Amarinder Singh.

On September 12, 2021, a statue of Singh was erected at Wolverhampton, West Midlands to commemorate the 124th anniversary of the battle.
