= Bahadurganj, Kapilvastu =

Bahadurganj बहादुरगञ्ज
- Village development committee
- Location in Nepal
- Coordinates: 27.55°N 82.84°E
- Country: Nepal
- Zone: Lumbini Zone
- District: Kapilvastu District

Population (1991)
  - Total: 4,590
- Time zone: UTC+5:45 (Nepal Time)

Bahadurganj is a village development committee in Kapilvastu District in the Lumbini Zone of southern Nepal. At the time of the 1991 Nepal census it had a population of 8210 people living in 1419 individual households.
