= Bahadurpur, Nawanshahr =

Bahadurpur
- Village
- Location in Punjab, India Bahadurpur (India)
- Coordinates: 31.057194°N 76.0296231°E
- Country: India
- State: Punjab
- District: Shaheed Bhagat Singh Nagar

Government
  - Type: Panchayat raj
  - Body: Gram panchayat
- Elevation: 254 m (833 ft)

Population (2011)
  - Total: 997
- Sex ratio 512/455 ♂/♀

Languages
  - Official: Punjabi
- Time zone: UTC+5:30 (IST)
- Telephone code: 01823
- ISO 3166 code: IN-PB
- Post office
- Website: nawanshahr.nic.in

Bahadurpur is a village in Shaheed Bhagat Singh Nagar district of Punjab State, India. It is located 10 kilometres (6.2 mi) away from Rahon, 4.2 kilometres (2.6 mi) from Aur, 13 kilometres (8.1 mi) from district headquarter Shaheed Bhagat Singh Nagar and 100 kilometres (62 mi) from state capital Chandigarh. The village is administrated by Sarpanch an elected representative of the village.

== Demography ==
As of 2011, Bahadurpur has a total number of 195 houses and a population of 967 of which 512 include are males while 455 are females according to the report published by Census India in 2011. The literacy rate of Bahadurpur is 79.05%, higher than the state average of 75.84%. The population of children under the age of 6 years is 108 which is 11.17% of total population of Bahadurpur, and child sex ratio is approximately 862 as compared to Punjab state average of 846.

Most of the people are from Schedule Caste which constitutes 81.18% of total population in Bahadurpur. The town does not have any Schedule Tribe population so far.

As per the report published by Census India in 2011, 349 people were engaged in work activities out of the total population of Bahadurpur which includes 294 males and 55 females. According to census survey report 2011, 87.97% workers describe their work as main work and 12.03% workers are involved in Marginal activity providing livelihood for less than 6 months.

== Education ==
The village has a Punjabi medium, co-ed primary school founded in 1971. The schools provide mid-day meal as per Indian Midday Meal Scheme. The school provide free education to children between the ages of 6 and 14 as per Right of Children to Free and Compulsory Education Act. Amardeep Singh Shergill Memorial college Mukandpur and Sikh National College Banga are the nearest colleges. Lovely Professional University is 48 kilometres (30 mi) away from the village.

== Landmarks ==
Singh Sabha Gurudwara and Baba Bhula Ji are religious sites. The village does not have the facilities of banks or Cash machine (ATM).

== Transport ==
Nawanshahr railway station is the nearest train station however, Garhshankar Junction railway station is 30 kilometres (19 mi) away from the village. Sahnewal Airport is the nearest domestic airport which located 57 kilometres (35 mi) away in Ludhiana and the nearest international airport is located in Chandigarh also Sri Guru Ram Dass Jee International Airport is the second nearest airport which is 156 kilometres (97 mi) away in Amritsar.

== See also ==
- List of villages in India
