= Bilga (Ludhiana East) =

- Village
- Location in Punjab, India Bilga (India)
- Coordinates: 30.900965°N 75.8572758°E
- Country: India
- State: Punjab
- District: Ludhiana

Government
  - Type: Panchayati raj (India)
  - Body: Gram panchayat

Languages
  - Official: Punjabi
  - Other spoken: Hindi
- Time zone: UTC+5:30 (IST)
- Telephone code: 0161
- ISO 3166 code: IN-PB
- Vehicle registration: PB-10
- Website: ludhiana.nic.in

Bilga is a village located in the Ludhiana East tehsil, of Ludhiana district, Punjab.

== Administration ==
The village is administrated by a Sarpanch who is an elected representative of village as per constitution of India and Panchayati raj (India).

| Particulars | Total | Male | Female |
|---|---|---|---|
| Total No. of Houses | 419 | | |
| Population | 2003 | 1060 | 943 |
