= Boothgarh Jattan =

- Village
- Location in Punjab, India Boothgarh Jattan (India)
- Coordinates: 30.9515481°N 76.104791°E
- Country: India
- State: Punjab
- District: Ludhiana

Government
  - Type: Panchayati raj (India)
  - Body: Gram panchayat

Languages
  - Official: Punjabi
- Time zone: UTC+5:30 (IST)
- Telephone code: 0161
- ISO 3166 code: IN-PB
- Vehicle registration: PB-10
- Website: ludhiana.nic.in

Boothgarh Jattan is a village located in the Ludhiana East tehsil, of Ludhiana district, Punjab.It is situated near the Machhiwara-Rahon Highway about 25 km to the east from Ludhiana district headquarters.This village is also near the coast of the Satluj River .It is a part of Sahnewal assembly constituency and Fatehgarh Sahib parliament constituency.Machhiwara Sahib is nearest town to Boothgarh Jattan village for all major economic activities.The total geographical area of village is about 200 hectares.Majority of the village population is into agriculture sector.

== Administration ==
The village is administrated by a Sarpanch who is an elected representative of village as per constitution of India and Panchayati raj (India).

Particulars	Total	Male	Female
Total No. of Houses	113		
Population	570	311	259
