= Panglian =

Village in Punjab, India

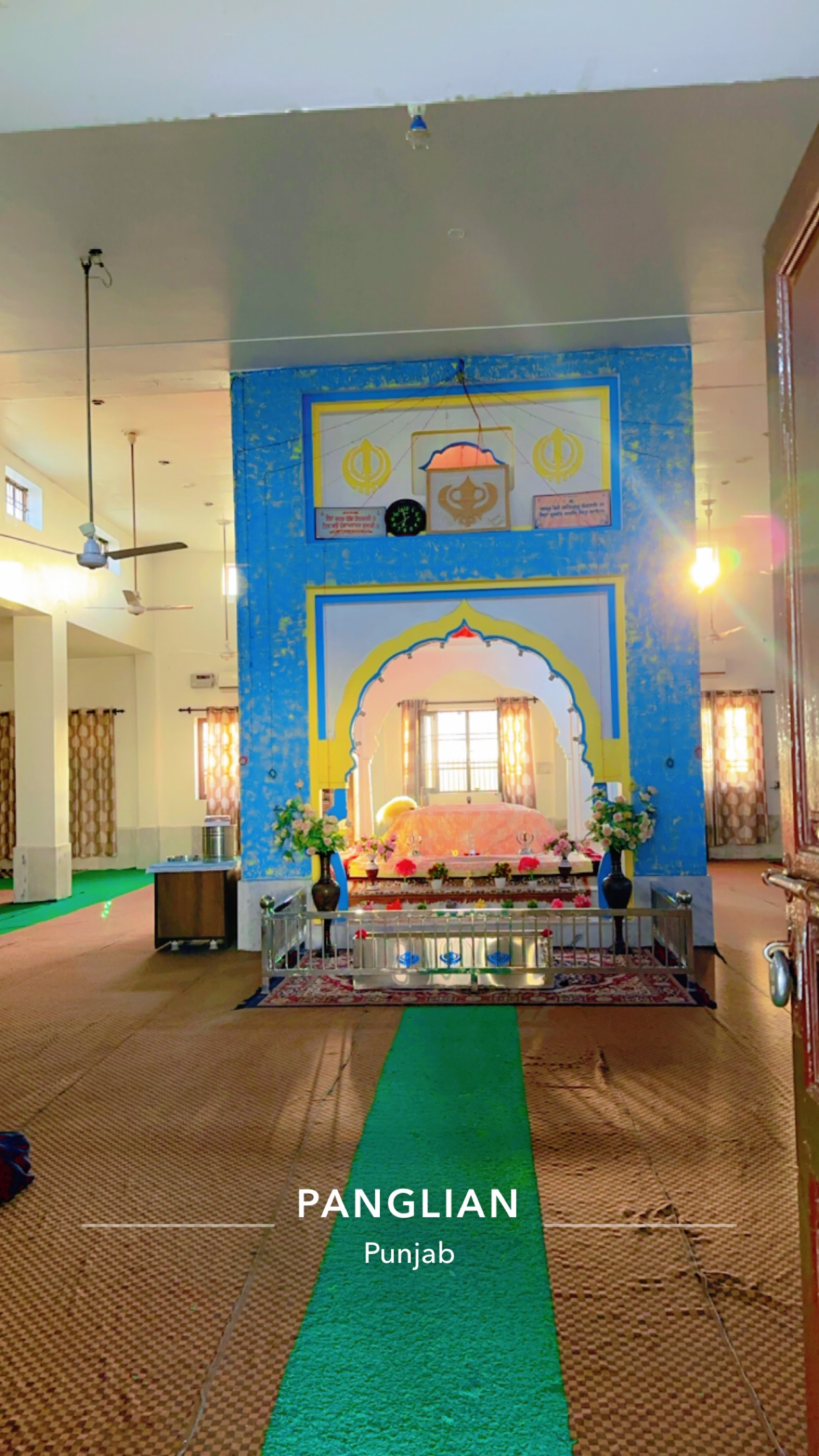
ਗੁਰੂਦਵਾਰਾ ਸਾਹਿਬ ਪਿੰਡ ਪਾਂਗਲੀਆਂ

Panglian is a small village in Ludhiana district in the Indian state of Punjab. It is located off of a main road going from Ludhiana to Chandigarh (capital city of Punjab) between Kohara and Katani. Most people of the village are farmers by trade, but now the village is being consumed by the surrounding urban development.

== About Panglian ==
- It is located 18 km towards East from District headquarters Ludhiana
- 22 km from Ludhiana-1
- 84 km from State capital Chandigarh Panglian Pin code is 141112 and postal head office is Kohara
- Hiran (1 km), Barwala(1 km), Chhandaran(2.5 km) Chak sarwan nath (1.5 km)Rampur ( 2.5 km ), Kohara(4 km), Katana sahib(4 km)Katani Kalan ( 4 km ), Raian ( 4 km ), Kanech ( 4 km ), Mangarh ( 3 km ), Sahnewal(7 km), Doraha(7 km) are the nearby Villages to Panglian
- Panglian is surrounded by Sahnewal Tehsil towarrd, Tehsil towards East, Ludhiana-1 EAST
- Ludhiana, Khanna, Ahmedgarh, Phillaur, Sirhind, Samrala, Ropar, Fatehgarh sahib are the neighbouring villages.
- 1 Gurudwara Sahib Located in Village, 1 Dharmik place Baba Bawe Wale also
- Shaheed Baba Didar Singh Located near Water Tanki also Sports Club Name Baba Didar Singh
- Pangli Mobile Showroom is a famous mobile sales outlet in Kohara. Which is famous by the name of Panglian village.
