= Pirthipur, Punjab =

Pirthipur
- village
- Location in Punjab, India Pirthipur (India)
- Coordinates: 30.908926°N 76.099416°E
- Country: India
- State: Punjab

Languages
  - Official: Punjabi
- Time zone: UTC+5:30 (IST)

Pirthipur, Punjab is a village in the Indian state of Punjab. Located in the Ludhiana district, it is mainly driven by agriculture.
