= Bhaini Nathu =

- Village
- Location in Punjab, India Bhaini Nathu (India)
- Coordinates: 30.9200781°N 76.0332901°E
- Country: India
- State: Punjab
- District: Ludhiana

Government
  - Type: Panchayati raj (India)
  - Body: Gram panchayat

Languages
  - Official: Punjabi
  - Other spoken: Hindi
- Time zone: UTC+5:30 (IST)
- Telephone code: 0161
- ISO 3166 code: IN-PB
- Vehicle registration: PB-10
- Website: ludhiana.nic.in

Bhaini Nathu is a village located in the Ludhiana East tehsil, of Ludhiana district, Punjab.

== Administration ==
The village is administrated by a Sarpanch who is an elected representative of village as per constitution of India and Panchayati raj (India).

Particulars	Total	Male	Female
Total No. of Houses	81		
Population	422	215	207

== Child Sex Ratio details ==
The village population of children with an age group from 0-6 is 56 which makes up 13.27% of total population of village. Average Sex Ratio is 963 per 1000 males which is higher than the state average of 895. The child Sex Ratio as per census is 1074, higher than average of 846 in the state of Punjab.

== Cast ==
The village constitutes 38.86% of Schedule Caste and the village doesn't have any Schedule Tribe population.
