= Kesari (2019 film) =

2019 Indian film by Anurag Singh

- Theatrical release poster
- Directed by: Anurag Singh
- Written by: Anurag Singh; Girish Kohli
- Produced by: Karan Johar; Hiroo Yash Johar; Aruna Bhatia; Apoorva Mehta; Sunir Kheterpal
- Starring: Akshay Kumar; Parineeti Chopra
- Cinematography: Anshul Chobey
- Edited by: Manish More
- Music by: Songs: Tanishk Bagchi; Arko Pravo Mukherjee; Chirantan Bhatt; Jasbir Jassi; Gurmoh; Jasleen Royal; Score: Raju Singh
- Production companies: Zee Studios; Dharma Productions; Cape of Good Films; Azure Entertainment
- Distributed by: Zee Studios
- Release date: 21 March 2019
- Running time: 150 minutes
- Country: India
- Language: Hindi
- Box office: ₹207.09 crore

Kesari (transl. Saffron) is a 2019 Indian Hindi-language historical war film starring Akshay Kumar and directed by Anurag Singh. It follows the events leading to the Battle of Saragarhi, a battle between 21 Sikh soldiers of the 36th Sikhs Regiment of the British Indian Army and 10,000 - 12,000 Afridi and Orakzai Pashtun tribesmen in 1897.

Originally conceived as a joint production between Salman Khan and Karan Johar, Kesari was officially announced in October 2017 with Akshay Kumar cast as Havildar Ishar Singh, the real-life hero of the Battle of Saragarhi. While Khan later exited the project, Kumar and Johar remained attached in their respective roles. Parineeti Chopra was eventually cast as the wife of Kumar’s character. Principal photography for the film began in January 2018 and concluded in December. The soundtrack was composed by Tanishk Bagchi, Arko Pravo Mukherjee, Chirantan Bhatt, Jasbir Jassi, Gurmoh and Jasleen Royal with lyrics written by Kumaar, Manoj Muntashir, Kunwar Juneja and Bagchi. Produced on a budget of ₹80 crore (equivalent to ₹99 crore or US$10 million in 2023), the film was distributed internationally by Zee Studios.

Kesari was released in India during the Holi festival, on 21 March 2019. The film was a blockbuster at box office, grossing over ₹207 crore worldwide. The film earned eight nominations at the 65th Filmfare Awards in 2020 including Best Actor for Kumar.

== Plot ==
Havildar Ishar Singh is a soldier in the 36th Sikhs Regiment of the British Indian Army. His commander who is an arrogant British officer who deems all Indians to be cowards and is jealous of Ishar Singh because of his superior fighting skills. The regiment is posted at Gulistan Fort, on the border between British-held territory and the Afghan border. Once, while on a border patrol, the troops see a group of Pashtun Afghan tribesmen, led by Saidullah, on the verge of killing a married Afghan woman because she refuses to accept her husband, who has been chosen by her family without her consent. The British officer refuses to intervene and save the woman, saying she is an Afghan citizen and does not reside in British territory; since it is a family matter about tribal custom, the policy of the British Raj is not to interfere. In defiance of the orders of his officer, Ishar Singh fights off the tribesmen and rescues the woman by killing her husband.

The British officer writes a strong report informing his commanding officer, who sits at the nearby Lockhart fort, of Ishar Singh's disobedience and insubordination. Soon enough, the Afghans attack the British-controlled Gulistan fort, but are held at bay by Ishar Singh, who fights valiantly and kills many Afghans. Nevertheless, Ishar Singh is blamed by his superiors for his actions, which caused the breach of peace with the Afghans. He is given a punishment transfer to Saragarhi Fort, which sits between Gulistan and Lockhart forts, and enables communication between them. Ishar Singh duly travels to Saragarhi Fort, where he finds the troop in a mess. He enforces discipline by punishing all who stay without food for an entire week. The troops are furious at first, but later begin to respect Ishar Singh after learning that he too was living without food. Meanwhile, Saidullah allies the Afghan tribes and motivates them to mount an attack on British territories as a unified force. Ishar Singh and Lal Singh go to a nearby village in search of their informant, who hadn't reported to them for over three days.

The British Commanding Officer, Col. John Haughton from Lockhart Fort, sees the Afghan Forces marching towards Sargarhi and alerts Ishar. Ishar and his battalion see ten thousand tribesmen approaching and encircling the fort. Saidullah, with the entire Afghan army at his back, beheads the woman Ishar Singh had rescued earlier in front of the Saragarhi Fort. Despite the commanding officer's orders to fight, Ishar lies to them and says that the commanding officer has told them to abandon the fort and flee. Ishar wants them to decide on their own to stay and fight, not due to an order from a British officer. Ishar Singh and his men decide to fight till death. Khuda Daad, the cook, volunteers to fight, but Ishar Singh asks him to instead provide water to the injured soldiers (including the Afghans). The Afghans initiate the battle, and Bhagwan Singh is the first to be killed. Gurmukh Singh, a young, inexperienced soldier, is unable to fight; Ishar Singh asks him to keep the CO updated regarding the battle and decides to prolong the battle to prevent the Afghans from advancing to the Gulistan and Lockhart forts. As the battle prolongs, Lal Singh alone fights the Afghans outside the fort and dies while asking one of the sepoys to close the gate to the fort. The Afghans destroy the west wall of the fort using explosives.

Ishar Singh remembers his wife, Jeevani, one last time after removing the stripes from his uniform, and starts fighting the Afghans with a red-hot sword until he gets fatally stabbed. Saidullah kills Khuda Daad before himself being stabbed to death by Ishar while trying to remove his turban. Ishar's bravery impresses an Afghan chieftain who orders his men not to touch any Sikh's turban. At this, the Head Afghan chieftain, Gul Badshah, orders the signaling post to be lit up so Gurmukh Singh's painful screams can be heard as a consolation. As the Afghans set the post on fire, Gurmukh Singh emerges with his body on fire. He chants "Bole So Nihal, Sat Sri Akaal" thrice, grabs Gul Badshah, and triggers the grenades attached to his body, resulting in a huge explosion. The shout echoes and reaches both the nearby forts. The Sikh soldiers present there also start chanting in the name of their Guru. The Afghans loot the fort and eventually set it on fire. The British Parliament honors the fallen with a two-minute silence and posthumously awards them the First-Class Indian Order of Merit (IOM) - the highest gallantry award (equivalent to the Victoria Cross) an Indian soldier could receive in those times.

== Cast ==
- Akshay Kumar as Havildar Ishar Singh, IOM, IDSM
- Parineeti Chopra as Jeevani Kaur
- Ashwath Bhatt as Gul Badshah Khan
- Mir Sarwar as Khan Masud
- Rakesh Chaturvedi as Mullah Saidullah
- Suvinder Vicky as Nk. Lal Singh, IOM
- Vivek Saini as Sep. Jiwan Singh, IOM
- Vansh Bharadwaj as L/Nk. Chanda Singh, IOM
- Pritpal Pali as Sep. Gurmukh Singh, IOM
- Vikram Kochhar as Sep. Gulab Singh, IOM
- Rimple Dhindsa as Sep. Ramm Singh, IOM
- Ravinder Pawar as Sep. Attar Singh, IOM
- Surmeet Singh Basra as Sep. Gurmukh Singh, IOM
- Ajit Singh Mahela as Sep. Nand Singh, IOM
- Sandeep Nahar as Sep. Buta Singh, IOM
- Harvinder Singh as Sep. Daya Singh, IOM
- Rakesh Sharma as Sep. Bhola Singh, IOM
- Adhrit Sharma as Sep. Uttam Singh, IOM
- Harbhagwan Singh as Sep. Bhaghwan Singh, IOM
- Rajdeep Singh Dhaliwal as Sep. Ram Singh, IOM
- Gurpreet Toti as Sep. Sahib Singh, IOM
- Harry Brar as Sep. Sunder Singh, IOM
- Pali Sandhu as Sep. Narayan Singh, IOM
- Vikram Singh Chauhan as Sep. Hira Singh, IOM
- Gagneet Singh Makhan as Sep. Jivan Singh, IOM
- Brahma Mishra as Daad
- Jaspreet Singh as Taklu
- Toranj Kayvon as Gulwarien
- R. Bhakti Klein as Major Des-Voeux

== Production ==
=== Development ===
In 2017, Salman Khan and Karan Johar announced that they would be producing a film together based on the Battle of Saragarhi starring Akshay Kumar in the lead role. Media reports later speculated Khan left the project in favor of a similarly themed film starring Ajay Devgn, and in October that year, Johar and Kumar announced a statement about their collaboration on the film; that Khan had quit the film, and that it would be titled Kesari. Parineeti Chopra was confirmed for a minor role as the wife of Kumar's character, whom he had left behind at the village after joining the army.

=== Filming ===
Principal photography began on 5 January 2018 and finished on 31 December 2018. The film was produced on a budget of ₹80 crore (equivalent to ₹99 crore or US$10 million in 2023).

== Music ==
The music of the film is composed by Tanishk Bagchi, Arko Pravo Mukherjee, Chirantan Bhatt, Arijit Singh, Jasbir Jassi, Gurmoh and Jasleen Royal with lyrics written by Kumaar, Manoj Muntashir, Kunwar Juneja and Tanishk Bagchi.

== Marketing and release ==
Kumar released Kesari's first look poster on 12 September 2018, through Twitter. Another poster was released on India's Republic Day, 26 January 2019. The film's theatrical poster was released on 11 February 2019.

The following day, Dharma Productions released three videos titled "Glimpses of Kesari" on their YouTube channel, detailing the film's production. A second theatrical release poster for Kesari was released on 20 February 2019.

The first song of the film "Sanu Kehndi" was released on 27 February 2019, while the second song, "Teri Mitti", was released on 15 March 2019 and the full album was released on 18 March 2019.

Kesari was released worldwide during the Indian Holi festival, on 21 March 2019. It had a release on 4200 screens worldwide, 3600 screens of which were in India and the rest overseas.

=== Home video ===
Kesari was made available as VOD on Amazon Prime Video in May 2019.

== Reception ==
=== Critical response ===
On Rotten Tomatoes, 33% of 15 critics' reviews are positive, with an average of 5.1 out of 10 Rachit Gupta of The Times of India gave Kesari four stars out of five, praising its "technical brilliance, intricate writing and thundering performances". Writing for Times Now, Gaurang Chauhan rated the film three and a half stars out of five and opined, "Kesari is not the best patriotic film or action film to come out of Bollywood, but it surely is worth the time and money".

Nandini Ramnath of Scroll.in writes, "Sluggishly paced until the interval and springing to life only in fits and starts in the second half, Kesari is a poor attempt to revisit a chapter in Indian military history that earned the admiration even of British colonizers." Additionally, the movie received negative criticism for its portrayal of the main antagonist as a stereotypical Muslim maulana, as well as for displaying rancor against a Sikh turban by Muslim Afghans.

=== Box office ===
Kesari opened with collection of ₹210.6 million on its first day. The collection of extended weekend of the film is ₹780.7 million, which was the highest opening weekend collection of 2019 for Bollywood films released till May. It's domestic gross was ₹182.30 crore and overseas gross ₹24.79 crore. It has grossed ₹207.09 crore worldwide to become an all-time-blockbuster. The film grossed over ₹100 crore worldwide in its opening weekend. It became the fastest ₹100 crore earning film in domestic net in 2019 for Bollywood films released till May. It eventually grossed over ₹200 crore (equivalent to ₹249 crore or US$26 million in 2023) worldwide in its fourth week.

== Awards and nominations ==
List of awards and nominations
Award	Date of ceremony	Category	Recipient(s)	Result	Ref(s)
Filmfare Awards	15 February 2020	Best Actor	Akshay Kumar	Nominated	
Filmfare Awards	15 February 2020	Best Music	Tanishk Bagchi, Arko Pravo Mukherjee, Chirantan Bhatt, Jasbir Jassi, Gurmoh and Jasleen Royal	Nominated	
Filmfare Awards	15 February 2020	Best Lyricist	Manoj Muntashir for "Teri Mitti"	Nominated	
Filmfare Awards	15 February 2020	Best Lyricist	Tanishk Bagchi for "Ve Mahi"	Nominated	
Filmfare Awards	15 February 2020	Best Male Playback Singer	Arijit Singh for "Ve Mahi"	Nominated	
Filmfare Awards	15 February 2020	Best Male Playback Singer	B Praak for "Teri Mitti"	Nominated	
Filmfare Awards	15 February 2020	Best Action	Parvez Shaikh; Lawrence Woodward	Nominated	
Filmfare Awards	15 February 2020	Best Production Design	Subrata Chakraborty; Amit Ray	Nominated	
IIFA Awards	24 November 2021	Best Film	Kesari	Nominated	
IIFA Awards	24 November 2021	Best Music Director	Tanishk Bagchi, Arko Pravo Mukherjee, Chirantan Bhatt, Jasbir Jassi, Raju Singh, Gurmoh and Jasleen Royal	Nominated	
IIFA Awards	24 November 2021	Best Lyricist	Manoj Muntashir (For "Teri Mitti")	Won	
IIFA Awards	24 November 2021	Best Male Playback Singer	B Praak (For "Teri Mitti")	Nominated	
National Film Awards	25 October 2021	Best Male Playback Singer	B Praak (For "Teri Mitti")	Won	
Nickelodeon Kids' Choice Awards India	21 December 2019	Favourite Bollywood Movie Song	"Ve Maahi" by Tanishk Bagchi, Arijit Singh and Asees Kaur	Won	

== Sequel ==
The second installment, Kesari Chapter 2, a historical legal drama, was released on 18 April 2025. In early April 2025, Akshay Kumar confirmed the third installment in series titled Kesari Chapter 3, which will be based on Sikh General Hari Singh Nalwa.
