= Bajra, Pakistan =

Bajra
- Town
- Location within Pakistan
- Coordinates: 30°53′05″N 72°26′25″E
- Country: Pakistan
- Province: Punjab
- District: Faisalabad
- Elevation: 149 m (489 ft)
- Time zone: UTC+5 (PST)

Bajra is a town in Faisalabad District, in central Punjab, Pakistan.
