= Bahadurpur, Mainpuri =

Village in Uttar Pradesh, India

Bahadurpur
- Village
- Location in Uttar Pradesh, India
- Coordinates: 27.27353°N 79.04244°E
- Country: India
- State: Uttar Pradesh
- District: Mainpuri
- Tehsil: Mainpuri

Area
  - Total: 1.49 km^{2} (0.58 sq mi)

Population (2011)
  - Total: 821
  - Density: 551/km^{2} (1,430/sq mi)
- Time zone: UTC+5:30 (IST)

Bahadurpur (Bahādurpur) is a village in Mainpuri block of Mainpuri district, Uttar Pradesh. As of 2011, it has a population of 821, in 145 households.

== Demographics ==
As of 2011, Bahadurpur had a population of 821, in 145 households. This population was 51.9% male (426) and 48.1% female (395). The 0-6 age group numbered 139 (76 male and 63 female), or 16.9% of the total population. 52 residents were members of Scheduled Castes, or 6.3% of the total.

The 1981 census recorded Bahadurpur as having a population of 451 people, in 76 households.

The 1961 census recorded Bahadurpur as comprising 2 hamlets, with a total population of 294 people (155 male and 139 female), in 57 households and 45 physical houses. The area of the village was given as 402 acres.

== Infrastructure ==
As of 2011, Bahadurpur had 1 primary school; it did not have any healthcare facilities. Drinking water was provided by hand pump and tube well/borehole; there were no public toilets. The village had a post office but no public library; there was at least some access to electricity for residential and agricultural purposes. Streets were made of both kachcha and pakka materials.
