= Jiwanpur, Ludhiana district =

Jiwanpur Jiwanpur
- Village
- Location within Punjab Location within India
- Coordinates: 30.966429°N 75.970272°E
- Country: India
- State: Punjab
- District: Ludhiana
- Talukas: Ludhiana

Government
  - Type: Panchayati raj (India)
  - Body: Gram panchayat

Languages
  - Official: Punjabi
  - Regional: Punjabi
- Time zone: UTC+5:30 (IST)
- PIN: 141007
- Telephone code: 0161
- Nearest city: Ludhiana

Jiwanpur is a large village in the Ludhiana district in Punjab, India.
