= Khaira, Ludhiana =

Khaira
- Village
- Location in Punjab, India Khaira (India)
- Coordinates: 30°49′N 76°06′E
- Country: India
- State: Punjab
- District: Ludhiana

Government
  - Type: Panchayat

Area
  - Total: 17.37 km^{2} (6.71 sq mi)

Population (2011)
  - Total: 1,150
  - Density: 66.2/km^{2} (171/sq mi)

Languages
  - Official: Punjabi
- Time zone: UTC+5:30 (IST)
- PIN: 141418
- Telephone code: 01628
- Vehicle registration: PB-10

Khaira is a village in Ludhiana district in the Indian state of Punjab.

== Demographics ==
Khaira is a medium size village located in Samrala of Ludhiana district, Punjab with total 230 families residing. The Khaira village has population of 1150 of which 603 are males while 547 are females as per Population Census 2011.

In Khaira village population of children with age 0-6 is 102 which makes up 8.87% of total population of village. Average Sex Ratio of Khaira village is 907 which is higher than Punjab state average of 895. Child Sex Ratio for the Khaira as per census is 925, higher than Punjab average of 846.

Khaira village has higher literacy rate compared to Punjab. In 2011, literacy rate of Khaira village was 82.25% compared to 75.84% of Punjab. In Khaira Male literacy stands at 88.18% while female literacy rate was 75.70%. In Khaira village, most of the villagers are from Schedule Caste (SC). Schedule Caste (SC) constitutes 41.65% of total population in Khaira village. The village Khaira currently does not have any Schedule Tribe (ST) population.

As per constitution of India and Panchyati Raaj Act, Khaira village is administrated by Sarpanch Shrimati Sarbjit kaur khaira(Head of Village)(2018-present) is elected representative of village.

== Transportation ==
Khaira is a village in Samrala Tehsil in Ludhiana District of Punjab, India. It is located 36 km to the east of District headquarters Ludhiana, and 66 km from State capital Chandigarh.

Khaira Pin code is 141418 and postal head office is Rampur (Ludhiana).

Khaira is surrounded by Machhiwara Tehsil to the north, Doraha Tehsil to the west, Khanna Tehsil to the south, Chamkaur Sahib Tehsil to the east.

Khanna, Morinda, Ludhiana, Nawanshahr are the nearby cities to Khaira.

This place is in the border of the Ludhiana District and Fatehgarh Sahib District. Fatehgarh Sahib District Khamano is south towards this place.

== Education ==
Khaira nearest schools has been listed as follows.

1. Khalsa High School Madpur
2. High School Lall Kalan
3. Govt Primary School Katana Sahib
4. Boys Primary School Katani Kalan
5. Govt Primary School Begowal
