= Bahadur Pur =

Bahadur Pur Bahadur Pur
- union
- Interactive map of Bahadur Pur
- Coordinates: 29°29′9″N 71°17′44″E
- Country: Pakistan

Population
  - Total: 30,000

Bahadur Pur is a Town and Union Council of Jalalpur Pirwala, in Pakistan, near Shujaabād.There is a College for secondary education named Government Higher Secondary School Bahadur Pur. Some of the villages are Depal, Sultan Wala, Abu Saeed, Kochi Wala, Sadiq Abad, Fateh Wala, Kanday Moor, Deeday Wala, Pahoor Wala and Bait Wahi. Peer Olya Shareef and Chan Wala are small towns near Bahadur Pur.There are also some private schools: Ravian Science Academy, Bab Ul Ilm Public School, Al Zakariya Public School.
