= Balliawal (Ludhiana East) =

- Village
- Location in Punjab, India Balliawal (India)
- Coordinates: 30.900965°N 75.8572758°E
- Country: India
- State: Punjab
- District: Ludhiana

Government
  - Type: Panchayati raj (India)
  - Body: Gram panchayat

Languages
  - Official: Punjabi
  - Other spoken: Hindi
- Time zone: UTC+5:30 (IST)
- Telephone code: 0161
- ISO 3166 code: IN-PB
- Vehicle registration: PB-91
- Website: ludhiana.nic.in

Balliawal is a village located in the Ludhiana East tehsil, of Ludhiana district, Punjab.

It is administered by a Sarpanch, and elected representative for the village under the constitution of India and Panchayati raj. There are 379 houses in the village, supporting a population of 2,000.

Children aged less than 6 comprise around 15% of the total population. 71.22% of the population are members of Scheduled Castes. According to census data there are no members of Scheduled Tribes in Balliawal.
