= Bhagpur (Ludhiana East) =

- Village
- Location in Punjab, India Bhagpur (India)
- Coordinates: 30.8898863°N 76.0318909°E
- Country: India
- State: Punjab
- District: Ludhiana

Government
  - Type: Panchayati raj (India)
  - Body: Gram panchayat

Languages
  - Official: Punjabi
- Time zone: UTC+5:30 (IST)
- Telephone code: 0161
- ISO 3166 code: IN-PB
- Vehicle registration: PB-10
- Website: ludhiana.nic.in

Bhagpur is a village located in the Ludhiana East tehsil, of Ludhiana district, Punjab.

== Administration ==
The village is administrated by a Sarpanch who is an elected representative of village as per constitution of India and Panchayati raj (India).

| Particulars | Total | Male | Female |
|---|---|---|---|
| Total No. of Houses | 235 | | |
| Population | 1,268 | 659 | 609 |

== Child Sex Ratio details ==
The village population of children with an age group from 0-6 is 121 which makes up 9.54% of total population of village. Average Sex Ratio is 924 per 1000 males which is higher than the state average of 895. The child Sex Ratio as per census is 891, higher than average of 846 in the state of Punjab.

== Cast ==
The village constitutes 35.17% of Schedule Caste and the village doesn't have any Schedule Tribe population.
