= Battle of Saragarhi =

1897 last stand battle in the British Raj

- Part of the Tirah Campaign
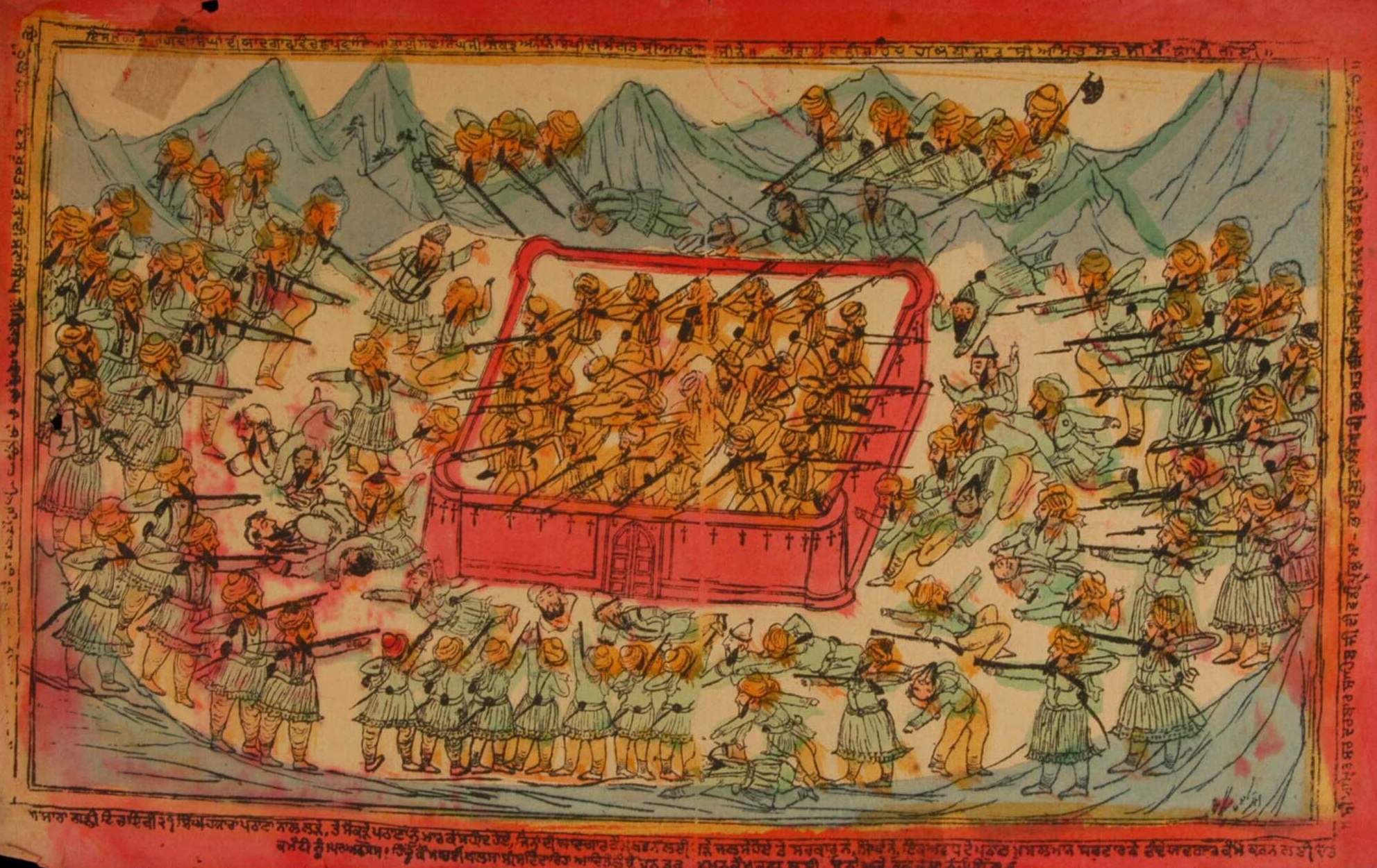
- Depiction of the Battle of Saragarhi of the Tirah Campaign, Popular Sikh style, Punjab, circa early 20th century
Date	12 September 1897
Location	Tirah, North-West Frontier Province, British India 33°33′15″N 70°53′15″E
Result	Afghan victory

Belligerents
British Empire • (British Raj) India	Afghans; Afridis; Orakzais

Commanders and leaders
Ishar Singh †	Gul Badshah

Strength
21	10,000 to 12,000

Casualties and losses
21 dead	450 (estimate) dead and wounded See Aftermath section

The Battle of Saragarhi was a last-stand battle fought before the Tirah Campaign between the British Indian Empire and Afghan tribesmen. On 12 September 1897, an estimated 12,000–24,000 Orakzai and Afridi tribesmen were seen near Gogra, at Samana Suk, and around Saragarhi, cutting off Fort Gulistan from Fort Lockhart. The Afghans attacked the outpost of Saragarhi where thousands of them swarmed and surrounded the fort, preparing to assault it. Led by Havildar Ishar Singh, the 21 soldiers in the fort—all of whom were Sikhs—refused to surrender and were wiped out in a last stand. The post was recaptured two days later by another British Indian contingent.

All of the 21 soldiers involved in the battle were posthumously awarded the Indian Order of Merit, which was the highest gallantry award that an Indian soldier could receive at the time. The Indian Army's 4th Battalion of the Sikh Regiment commemorates the battle every year on 12 September as Saragarhi Day.

== Background ==
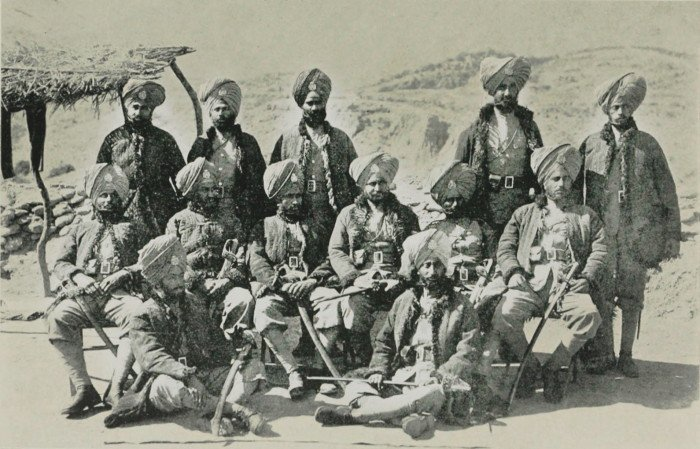
Photograph with the caption 'Native Sikhs of the 36th Sikhs. Tirah, 1897'

Saragarhi was a small village in the border district of Kohat, situated on the Samana Range, which was located in the North-West Frontier Province of British India (present-day Pakistan). On 20 April 1894, the 36th Sikhs of the British Indian Army was created under the command of Colonel J. Cook, entirely composed of Jat Sikhs. In August 1897, five companies of the 36th Sikhs under Lieutenant Colonel John Haughton were sent to the northwest frontier of British India (modern-day Khyber Pakhtunkhwa) and were stationed at Samana Hills, Kurag, Sangar, Sahtop Dhar, and Saragarhi.

The British had partially succeeded in getting control of this volatile area, but tribal Pashtuns continued to attack British personnel from time to time. Thus, a series of forts, originally built by Ranjit Singh, the ruler of the Sikh Empire, were consolidated. Two of the forts were Fort Lockhart (on the Samana Range of the Hindu Kush mountains), and Fort Gulistan (Sulaiman Range), situated a few miles apart. Fort Lockhart is located at 33.5562°N 70.9188°E. Due to the forts not being visible to each other, Saragarhi was created midway, as a heliographic communication post. The Saragarhi post, situated on a rocky ridge, consisted of a small block house with loop-holed ramparts and a signalling tower.

A general uprising by the Afghans began there in 1897 and, between 27 August and 11 September, many vigorous efforts by Pashtuns to capture the forts were thwarted by the 36th Sikhs. In 1897, insurgent and inimical activities had increased, and on 3 and 9 September Afridi tribesmen, allied with the Afghans, attacked Fort Gulistan. Both the attacks were repulsed, and a relief column from Fort Lockhart, on its return trip, reinforced the signalling detachment positioned at Saragarhi, increasing its strength to three non-commissioned officers (NCOs) and eighteen other ranks (ORs).

== The battle ==
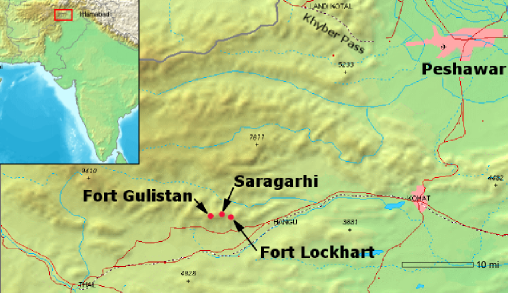
Map of the battle site

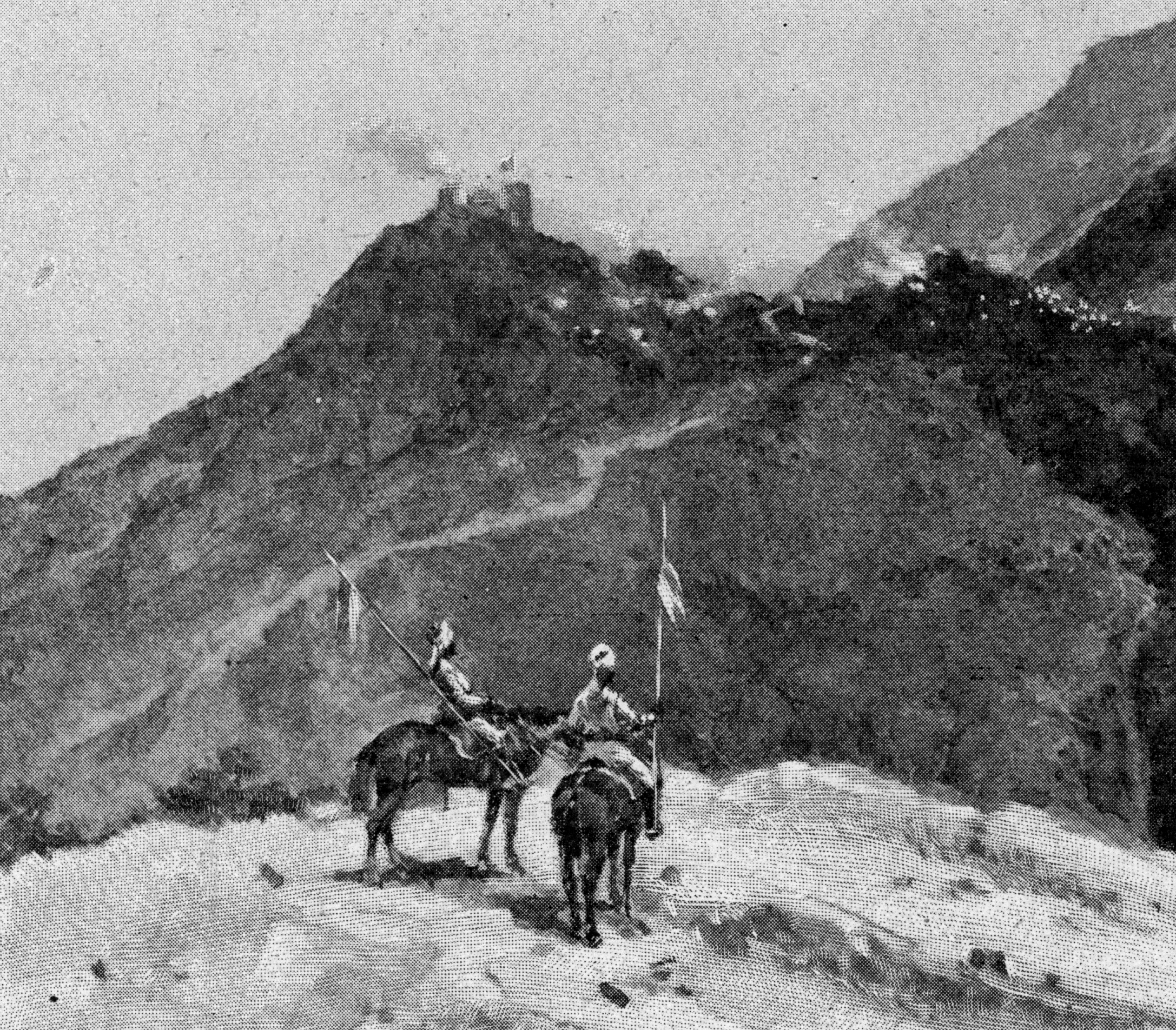
Saragarhi Post under siege as seen from Fort Lockhart, based on a sketch by Lt. R.G. Munn, published in the London Graphic on 23 October 1897

Details of the Battle of Saragarhi are considered fairly accurate because Sepoy Gurmukh Singh signalled events to Fort Lockhart by heliograph as they occurred.

- Around 09:00, approximately 6,000–10,000 Afghans reached the signalling post at Saragarhi.
- Sepoy Gurmukh Singh signaled to Colonel Haughton, situated in Fort Lockhart, that they were under attack.
- Haughton replied that he could not send immediate help to Saragarhi.
- The soldiers in Saragarhi decided to fight to the last to prevent the enemy from reaching the forts.
- Sepoy Bhagwan Singh was the first soldier to be killed, and Naik Lal Singh was seriously wounded.
- Naik Lal Singh and Sepoy Jiwa Singh reportedly carried the body of Bhagwan Singh back to the inner layer of the post.
- The Afghans broke a portion of the wall of the picket.
- Haughton signaled that he estimated that there were between 10,000 and 14,000 Pashtuns attacking Saragarhi.
- The leaders of the Pashtun forces reportedly made promises to the soldiers to try to entice them to surrender.
- Reportedly two determined attempts were made to rush open the gate, but were unsuccessful.
- The wall was breached.
- Thereafter, some of the fiercest hand-to-hand fighting occurred.
- Havildar Ishar Singh ordered his men to fall back into the inner layer, whilst he remained to cover their retreat. After the inner layer was breached, all but one of the defending soldiers were killed, along with many of the Pashtuns.
- Sepoy Gurmukh Singh, who communicated the battle to Haughton as a signalman, was the last surviving defender. His last message was to ask for permission to pick up his rifle. Upon receiving permission, he packed up the heliograph and held the door of his signalling shed. He is stated to have killed 40 Afghans, and the Pashtuns were forced to set fire to the post to kill him. As he was dying, Singh is said to have yelled repeatedly the Sikh battle cry "Bole So Nihal, Sat Sri Akal!" ("One will be blessed eternally, who says that God is the ultimate truth!")

=== Weapons ===
The weapons used by the Indian troops were of an older generation compared to the small arms issued to British troops. This was intentionally done after the Indian Mutiny of 1857 to prevent any further mutinies and uprisings from getting out of hand. The Afghans used the original and copy of Martini-Henry rifles. The Martini–Henry was copied on a large scale by North-West Frontier Province gunsmiths. The chief manufacturers were the Adam Khel Afridi, who lived around the Khyber Pass. The Khyber Pass gunsmiths first acquired examples of the various British service arms during nineteenth-century British military expeditions in the North-West Frontier, which they used to make copies.

=== Soldiers ===
The 21 Sikh soldiers were:

1. Havildar Ishar Singh, IOM, IDSM (regimental number 165)
2. Naik Lal Singh (332)
3. Lance Naik Chanda Singh (546)
4. Sepoy Sundar Singh (1321)
5. Sepoy Ramm Singh (287)
6. Sepoy Uttam Singh (492)
7. Sepoy Sahib Singh (182)
8. Sepoy Hira Singh (359)
9. Sepoy Daya Singh (687)
10. Sepoy Jivan Singh (760)
11. Sepoy Bhola Singh (791)
12. Sepoy Narayan Singh (834)
13. Sepoy Gurmukh Singh (814)
14. Sepoy Jivan Singh (871)
15. Sepoy Gurmukh Singh (1733)
16. Sepoy Ram Singh (163)
17. Sepoy Bhagwan Singh (1257)
18. Sepoy Bhagwan Singh (1265)
19. Sepoy Buta Singh (1556)
20. Sepoy Jivan Singh (1651)
21. Sepoy Nand Singh (1221)

== Aftermath ==
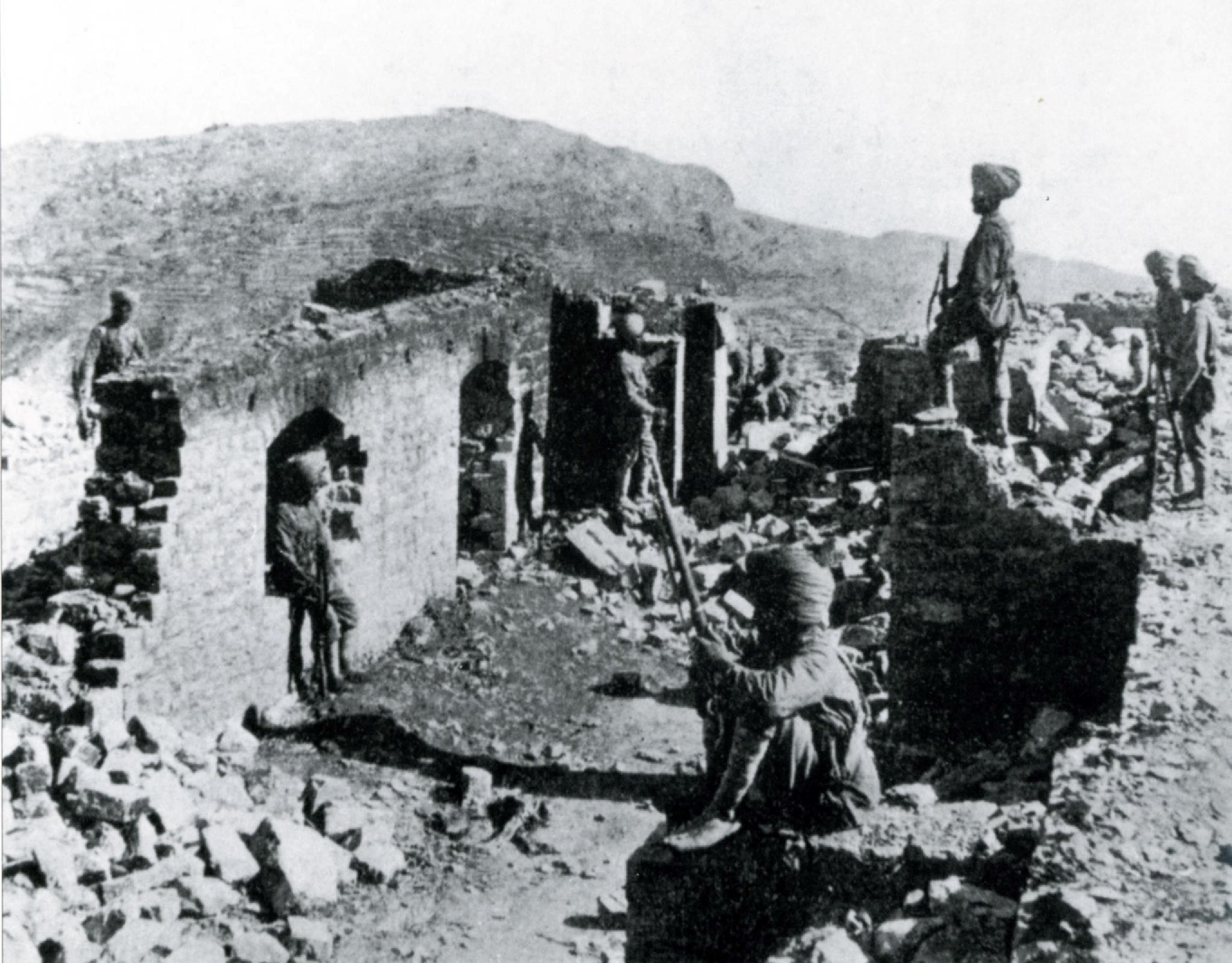
Photograph with the caption 'Fort Saragarhi (Saragarhi) in Ruins, Showing the Main Entrance and Fort Lockhart in the Distance'

Having destroyed Saragarhi, the Afghans turned their attention to Fort Gulistan, but they had been delayed too long, and reinforcements arrived there on the night of 13–14 September before the fort could be captured. The Pashtuns later admitted that they had lost about 180 killed and many more wounded during the engagement against the 21 Sikh soldiers. Some 600 bodies are said to have been seen around the ruined post when the relief party arrived (however, the fort had been retaken, on 14 September, by the use of intensive artillery fire, which may have caused some casualties). After it was retaken by the British, the burnt bricks of Saragarhi were used to make an obelisk for those fighters. The British also built gurdwaras at Amritsar and Ferozepur for them. The total casualties in the entire campaign, including the Battle of Saragarhi, numbered around 4,800.

== Commemoration ==
=== Commemorative tablet ===
The inscription of a commemorative tablet reads:

The Government of India have caused this tablet to be erected to the memory of the twenty-one non-commissioned officers and men of the 36 Sikh Regiment of the Bengal Infantry whose names are engraved below as a perpetual record of the heroism shown by these gallant soldiers who died at their posts in the defense of the fort of Saragarhi, on the 12 September 1897, fighting against overwhelming numbers, thus proving their loyalty and devotion to their sovereign The Queen Empress of India and gloriously maintaining the reputation of the Sikhs for unflinching courage on the field of battle.

=== Order of Merit ===
The 21 Sikh non-commissioned officers and soldiers who died in the Battle of Saragarhi were from the Majha region of Punjab and were posthumously awarded the Indian Order of Merit, at that time the highest gallantry award which an Indian soldier could receive. The corresponding gallantry award was the Victoria Cross. The award is equivalent to today's Param Vir Chakra awarded by the President of India.

== Remembrance and legacy ==
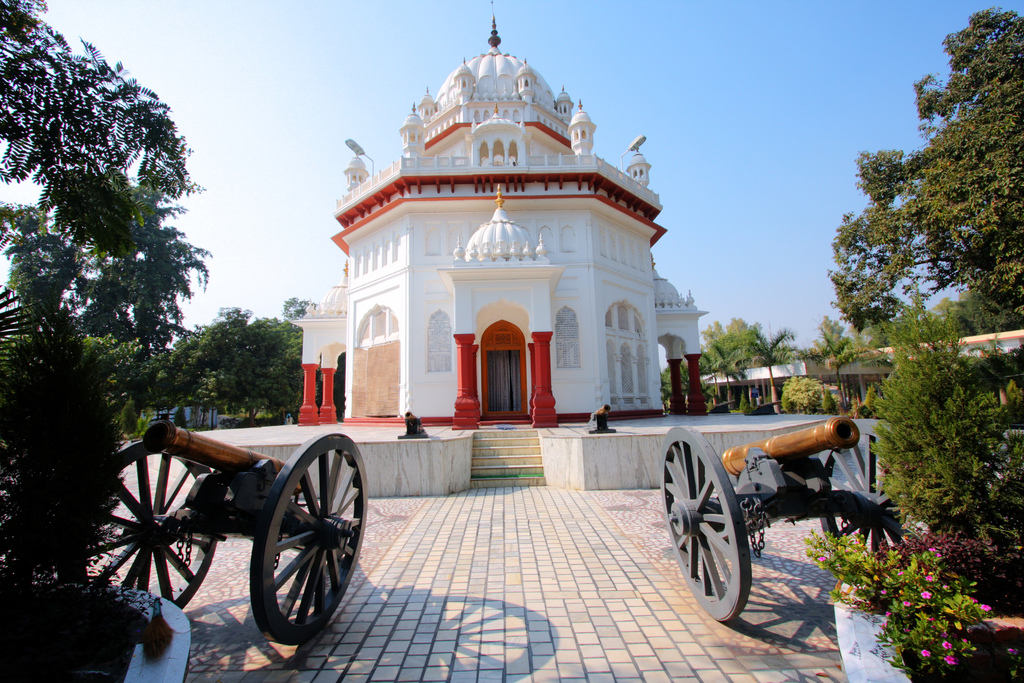
Saragarhi Memorial Gurdwara of Firozpur, built in 1904

The battle has become iconic of Eastern military civilisation, the British Empire's military history, and Sikh history. The modern Sikh Regiment of the Indian Army continues to commemorate the Battle of Saragarhi on 12 September each year as the Regimental Battle Honours Day.

To commemorate the men, the British built two Saragarhi Gurdwaras: one in Amritsar, very close to the main entrance of the Golden Temple, and another in Firozpur Cantonment, in the district that most of the men hailed from.

The epic poem "Khalsa Bahadur" is in memory of the Sikhs who died at Saragarhi.

=== In Indian schools ===
The Indian Armed Forces, in particular the Indian Army, has been pushing for the battle to be taught in India's schools. They would like the heroism demonstrated by the Indian soldiers to be taught as an inspiration to children. In 1999, various articles were printed regarding the matter in Punjab's longest-established newspaper, The Tribune, such as: "the military action at Saragarhi is taught to students the world over and particularly to students in France." Although there seems to be no evidence for this claim (it is not, for example, on France's national school curriculum), the news was enough to provoke political debate, and the battle has been taught in schools in Punjab since 2000:

The decision to include the battle story in the school curriculum was taken last year during a public rally presided over by the Punjab Chief Minister, Mr Parkash Singh Badal. Following this, the State Government issued a notification that the battle story should be included in the school curriculum from this session. There had been a constant demand from the Sikh Regiment and various ex-servicemen's associations that the battle be included in the school curriculum. A similar request had also been put forward to Mr Badal during the battle's state-level centenary celebrations at Ferozepore in 1997. A subsequent letter sent to the Punjab Government by the Saragarhi Memorial and Ethos Promotion Forum also urged the State Government that the battle has many inspiring lessons for children. On hearing the acts of valour, the British Parliament had then risen in unison to pay homage to the fallen soldiers.

=== Saragarhi Day ===
Saragarhi Day
- Official name: Saragarhi Day
- Observed by: India (also observed by Sikhs worldwide)
- Type: national & international
- Significance: Honors the 21 military Sikh soldiers who died at the Battle of Saragarhi
- Observances: Parades, school history projects, government buildings
- Date: 12 September (or nearest weekday)
- Related to: Remembrance Day

Saragarhi Day is a Sikh military commemoration day celebrated on 12 September every year to commemorate the Battle of Saragarhi. Sikh military personnel and civilians commemorate the battle around the world every year on 12 September. All units of the Sikh Regiment celebrate Saragarhi Day every year as the Regimental Battle Honours Day.

==== Saragarhi Day in the UK ====
The first recorded public discourse on Saragarhi was delivered by Viscount Slim in 2001 when he delivered the annual Portraits of Courage lecture at the Imperial War Museum. This was hosted by the Maharaja Duleep Singh Centenary Trust. In May 2002, Prince Charles ( the future King Charles III) inaugurated the Jawans to Generals exhibition which featured a section on Saragarhi. The exhibition successfully toured the UK and was seen by over 100,000 visitors.

Saragarhi was introduced back into the UK by writer and filmmaker Jay Singh Sohal and the British Army with the launch of the book Saragarhi: The Forgotten Battle in 2013 at Old College, Royal Military Academy Sandhurst. It has since been commemorated each year on its battle honour day by the British Armed Forces. In 2014, the commemoration also took place at Sandhurst at the Indian Army Memorial Room. In 2015, it took place at the Honourable Artillery Company Museum in London, where was also due to take place in 2016.

Various senior ministers and armed forces generals have paid tribute to Sikh service by mentioning the story of Saragarhi. In April 2016 the Defence Secretary Michael Fallon MP made mention as a special Vaisakhi event at the Ministry of Defence. In June 2016 the Chief of the General Staff Sir Nick Carter did the same at a special British Sikh Association dinner.

In November 2020, the Wolverhampton City Council approved plans for the erection of a 10 ft tall bronze statue commemorating the battle outside of the Guru Nanak Gurdwara in Wednesfield. The statue of Havildar Ishar Singh, paid for by donations from the local Sikh community totalling £100,000, was unveiled on 12 September 2021.

== In popular culture ==
In September 2017, Saragarhi: The True Story, a documentary by UK-based journalist-filmmaker Jay Singh-Sohal, was screened at the National Memorial Arboretum in Staffordshire to mark the 120th anniversary of the epic frontier battle. A TV series, 21 Sarfarosh - Saragarhi 1897 aired on Discovery Jeet from 12 February 2018 to 11 May 2018, starring Mohit Raina, Mukul Dev, and Balraj Singh Khehra. Kesari is a 2019 Indian Hindi-language war film based around the battle. Directed by Anurag Singh and starring Akshay Kumar, it grossed over ₹100 crores worldwide in its opening weekend during the Holi festival.

== See also ==
- Battle of Thermopylae
- Battle of Purandar
- Battle of Pavan Khind
- Tirah campaign
- Battle of Rezang La
- List of last stands
