= Bajra (Ludhiana East) =

- Village
- Location in Punjab, India Bajra (India)
- Coordinates: 30.9542286°N 75.8771497°E
- Country: India
- State: Punjab
- District: Ludhiana

Government
  - Type: Panchayati raj (India)
  - Body: Gram panchayat

Languages
  - Official: Punjabi
  - Other spoken: Hindi
- Time zone: UTC+5:30 (IST)
- Telephone code: 0161
- ISO 3166 code: IN-PB
- Vehicle registration: PB-91
- Website: ludhiana.nic.in

Bajra is a village located in the Ludhiana East tehsil, of Ludhiana district, Punjab.

== Administration ==
The village is administrated by a Sarpanch who is an elected representative of village as per constitution of India and Panchayati raj (India).

Particulars	Total	Male	Female
Total No. of Houses	1312		
Population	6,981	3,731	3,250

== Child Sex Ratio details ==
The village population of children with an age group from 0-6 is 835 which makes up 11.96% of total population of village. Average Sex Ratio is 871 per 1000 males which is lower than the state average of 895. The child Sex Ratio as per census is 1002, higher than average of 846 in the state of Punjab.

== Cast ==
The village constitutes 25.50% of Schedule Caste and the village doesn't have any Schedule Tribe population.
