= Bahadurpur, Gujarat =

Bahadurpur Badalpar badalpur
- village
- Location in Gujarat, India Bahadurpur (India)
- Coordinates: 21°35′N 71°44′E
- Country: India
- State: Gujarat
- District: Bhavnagar

Population (2010)
  - Total: 2,000 or less

Languages
  - Official: Gujarati, Kathiyawadi
- Time zone: UTC+5:30 (IST Kolkata)
- Vehicle registration: GJ 04-
- Coastline: 0 kilometres (0 mi)
- Nearest city: Palitana and Gariyadhar

Bahadurpur is a village in Palitana taluk of Bhavnagar district, Gujarat. It is not more than 10 km from Palitana taluka. The very famous Shatrunjaya mountain hills of Palitana wiz known for hundreds of Jain Palitana temples.

At the entry point of the village is an ashram featuring a temple. Outside the ashram's gate, the Gujarat Government constructed a bus stop, located approximately 1 km from the center of the village. The village includes a primary school and a panchayat.

People of this village are migrated to different cities of Gujarat. Most of them are settled in Surat, Ankleshwar, Navsari, Vapi etc.
