= Ludhiana Metro =

Proposed rapid transit system for the city of Ludhiana, Punjab

Overview
- Locale: Ludhiana, Punjab
- Transit type: Rapid transit
- Number of lines: 2 (Phase 1)
- Number of stations: 27
- Headquarters: Ludhiana, Punjab, India

Operation
- Operation will start: Cancelled
- Operator: Punjab Metro Rail Corporation (PMRC)
- Train length: 4–6 coaches

Technical
- System length: 28.83 kilometres (17.91 mi) (planned)
- Track gauge: 1,435 mm (4 ft 8+1/2 in) standard gauge
- Electrification: 25 kV, 50 Hz AC through overhead catenary
- Average speed: 33 km/h (21 mph)
- Top speed: 80 km/h (50 mph)

Ludhiana Metro was a proposed rapid transit system for the city of Ludhiana, Punjab. It is expected to cost ₹10,516 crore (US$1.97 billion).

== History ==
The Delhi Metro Rail Corporation was asked to prepare a detailed project report (DPR) in 2007. The state government estimated the project cost to be ₹30 billion (US$320 million) at 2007 prices. The DPR was scheduled to be finalized by the end of September 2012.

The DMRC report proposed 2 corridors. The first corridor of Ludhiana Metro will be 15.798 km long having 14 stations. The second corridor will be 13.035 km long with 13 stations. It will cost around ₹6,600 crore (US$710 million). A detailed feasibility study has been done by Delhi Metro Rail Corporation Ltd which took one and half years. The DMRC will be the Punjab Government's official consultant on the project. A special purpose vehicle, the Punjab Metro Rail Corporation (PMRC), will be established to execute the project.

On 17 July 2012, Punjab Chief Minister Parkash Singh Badal approved the project in the Public-Private Partnership (PPP) or Build Operate Transfer (BOT) model. On 2 September 2012, Deputy Chief Minister Sukhbir Singh Badal appointed the Ludhiana Municipal Commissioner as managing director of Ludhiana Metro and the director of Chawla textiles Mr.Aman Chawla will be responsible for time bound completion.

== Routes ==
The metro in Ludhiana will be of total 29 kilometers, of which 22 km will be elevated and 7 km will be underground. The two proposed corridors are:

Corridor I: Ayali Chowk – BBMB Power House This line will run from East to West following a distance of 15.798 km and will have 14 stations – 10 elevated and 4 underground. The stations are :

1. Ayali Chowk
2. Rajguru Nagar
3. Aggar Nagar
4. Verka Milk Plant
5. PAU
6. Aarti Chowk
7. Bharat Nagar Chowk
8. Guru Nanak Stadium
9. Gurdwara Dukh Niwaran
10. Civil Hospital
11. Samrala Chowk
12. Vardhman Mills
13. Jamalpur
14. BBMB Power House

Corridor II: Gill Village – Rahon Road Chungi This line will run from North to South covering a distance of 13.035 km and will have 13 stations – 6 elevated and 7 underground. The stations are :

1. Gill village
2. GNE College
3. ATI Chowk
4. Janta Nagar Chowk
5. Gill Chowk
6. City Bus Station
7. Railway Station
8. Basti Jodhewal
9. Rahon Road Chungi
10. Tibba road(near Satsang Ghar)
11. Salem Taberi
12. Kakobal Road
13. Tajpur Road
14. Clock tower

== Project Details ==
Estimated per kilometer cost for the construction of the metro will be Rs 1.75 billion for elevated track and Rs 3.25 billion for the underground. The average cost per kilometer is around Rs 3 billion.

There will be two maintenance depots for the metro, one will be near Baddowal and will spread over 26 hectares, and the second depot will be near Gill village spread over 21 hectares. At these depots, washing, cleaning, repair and maintenance of the train engine and bogies will be carried out.

The ticketing system of the Ludhiana Metro will be similar as of Delhi Metro, tentatively Rs 10 for first two kilometers and then there is formula to calculate further fares.

The DPR further states that the state government should exempt Punjab Value Added Tax (VAT) on the metro, and also charge no tax be on the electricity required for the operations. It has also proposed exemption of municipal taxes.

Also a Special Purpose Vehicle (SPV) should be set up for the Ludhiana Metro and should be registered under Companies Act. It should be a public sector undertaking of the state government and be named "Punjab Metro Rail Corporation".

Earlier, the total cost of the project was estimated at Rs 105.16 billion and was to be operational by 2014. Of the 29 km, some 12 km were underground, while rest would be above the ground.

== See also ==
- Ludhiana BRTS
