= List of people from Ludhiana =

This is a list of notable people from the city of Ludhiana in Punjab, India. It includes people who were born/raised in, lived in, or spent portions of their lives in Ludhiana, or for whom Ludhiana is a significant part of their identity.

== Notable individuals ==
- Agha Ibrahim Akram, Pakistan Army general and diplomat
- Diljit Dosanjh, born in Dosanjh Kalan village of Jalandhar but was raised in Ludhiana.
- Karan Aujla, born in Ghurala village of Ludhiana district.
- J. C. Mahindra, Indian industrialist and co-founder of Mahindra & Mahindra
- K.C. Mahindra Indian industrialist who co-founded Mahindra & Mahindra
- Sukhdev Thapar, Freedom fighter
- Kartar Singh Sarabha, Freedom fighter
- Gippy Grewal, Singer, actor
- Sukh Sanghera, Film director and music video director
- Bhai Randhir Singh, Freedom fighter
- Neelkamal Puri, novelist, columnist
- Dharmendra, actor
- Sunil Mittal, entrepreneur, founder of Airtel and Bharti Enterprises
- Simarjit Singh Bains, Social worker, politician
- Sahir Ludhianvi, lyricist
- Sukhdeep Singh Chakria, Boxer
- Divya Dutta, actress
- Manjit Rupowalia, Singer
- Trishneet Arora, Ethical hacker, author
- Shubha Phutela, actress
- Dakssh Ajit Singh, actor
- Jainti Dass Saggar, Physician, politician
- Abhinav Shukla, actor
- Sudarshan Agarwal, politician
- Shilpi Sharma, actress
- Gulzar Singh Sandhu, writer
- Naina Dhaliwal, Indian model
- Inderjit Hasanpuri, songwriter
- Ram Singh, Social reformer
- Maulana Habib-ur-Rehman Ludhianvi, One of the founders of Majlis-e-Ahrar-e-Islam
- Barkat Ali Ludhianwi, Muslim Sufi and founder of the Dar ul Ehsan organisation
- Agha Talish, Pakistani actor
- Raj Khosla, director
- Baldev Raj Chopra, producer and director
- Kuldeep Manak, Singer
- Inderjit Nikku, Singer
- Ravinder Grewal, Singer
- Amar Singh Chamkila, Singer
- Surinder Shinda, Singer
- Karnail Gill, Singer
- Ishmeet Singh, Singer
- Lal Chand Yamla Jatt, Singer
- Mandeep Singh, Cricketer
- Pankaj Kapoor, actor
- Hardev Dilgir, lyricist
- Saadat Hasan Manto, writer, playwright
- Sanjeev Talwar, MLA Ludhiana East
- Bharat Bhushan Ashu, MLA Ludhiana West, Punjab Cabinet Minister
- Ish Sodhi, New Zealand Cricketer
- Happy Raikoti, lyricist, singer
- Chetan Sharma, Indian cricket player
- Yashpal Sharma, Indian cricket player
- Jaswinder Bhalla, actor in Punjabi cinema
- Anuv Jain, singer and songwriter
- Anand Arnold, bodybuilder
- Balbir Singh Rajewal, Farm union leader and politician
- Bhavish Aggarwal, Businessman and Founder of Ola cabs and Ola Electric
- Prabhsukhan Singh Gill, Footballer who plays as a goalkeeper for Kerala Blasters and India national team
- Abdul Qadir, jurist, newspaper and magazine editor
