= Anand Arnold =

Indian bodybuilder

Anand Arnold (born 1987) is the first wheelchair-using bodybuilder of India. He is from Ludhiana, Punjab. In 2018, he won the silver medal in Mr. Olympia (Wheelchair) title.

He was born to Arnold in 1987. At the age of 13, Arnold won the first bodybuilding title. Two years later, he was diagnosed with spinal cancer, leading to paralysis from the neck down. After three years of being confined to the bed, he resumed training while reliant on a wheelchair. Arnold has won the Mr. India (Wheelchair) title four times, and the Mr. Punjab (Wheelchair) title twelve times. In 2015, the biography titled Weightless: A True Story Of Courage And Determination was written by the American author, Allen Woodman.

== Recognition ==
| Year | Competition | Category | Medal / Rank | Ref. |
|---|---|---|---|---|
| 2019 | Arnold Sports Festival | Pro Men's Wheelchair | Third | |
| 2018 | Mr. Olympia | Mr. Olympia (Wheelchair) | Silver | |
| 2000 | Mr. Gold | | Gold | |
