= Ludhianvi =

Ludhianvi is a Muslim surname, meaning someone from Ludhiana in India. The surname may refer to the following notable people:

- Abdul Majeed Ludhianvi (1934–2015), Pakistani Islamic scholar
- Barkat Ali Ludhianwi (1911–1997), Pakistani Muslim Sufi of the Qadri tariqa
- Habib-ur-Rehman Ludhianvi (1892–1956), Indian Islamic religious leader
- Muhammad Ahmed Ludhianvi (born 1950), Pakistani Muslim leader
- Muhammad Yusuf Ludhianvi (1932–2000), Pakistani Sunni Muslim scholar
- Rashid Ahmed Ludhianvi (1922–2002), Pakistani Islamic scholar
- Sahir Ludhianvi (1921–1980), Indian poet and film song lyricist
