= Qila Raipur Sports Festival =

Annual sports festival in Qila Raipur, Punjab, India

Qila Raipur Sports Festival, popularly known as the Rural Olympics, is held annually in Qila Raipur (near Ludhiana), in Punjab, India. The Government of Punjab was the major sponsor of the 86th annual festival held from 17 to 19 Feb 2026.

In February each year, Ludhiana becomes the destination for hundreds of sports enthusiasts, including foreigners. They come to Qila Raipur to see the special breed of bullocks, camels, dogs, mules and other animals competing in competitive events. In 2026 Kulwant Singh (Jugnu) secured the top position in the bullock cart competition, which was the centerpiece of the final day's events on February 19, 2026. The games were inaugurated by Punjab Agriculture Minister Gurmeet Singh Khuddian along with Col Surinder S Grewal (Retd) President Qila Raipur Sports Society and visited by Chief Minister Bhagwant Mann on the final day on February 19, 2026. New Field Hockey Astro Turf, Flood Lights for the Grewal Stadium (Patti Sohavia), Upgraded Indoor Badminton Stadium, Upgrade to the local roads and village pond, new library and an upgraded vet clinic were also announced by the Chief Minister.

Massive Turnout: The event drew record crowds, with spectators of all ages gathering to witness the revival of the Qila Raipur Bullock cart races. Speaker of the Punjab Legislative Assembly S. Kultar S Sandhwa alongside Cabinet Ministers, Olympians, representatives from the Indian Army and other dignitaries were also present at the event.

== Photo Gallery ==
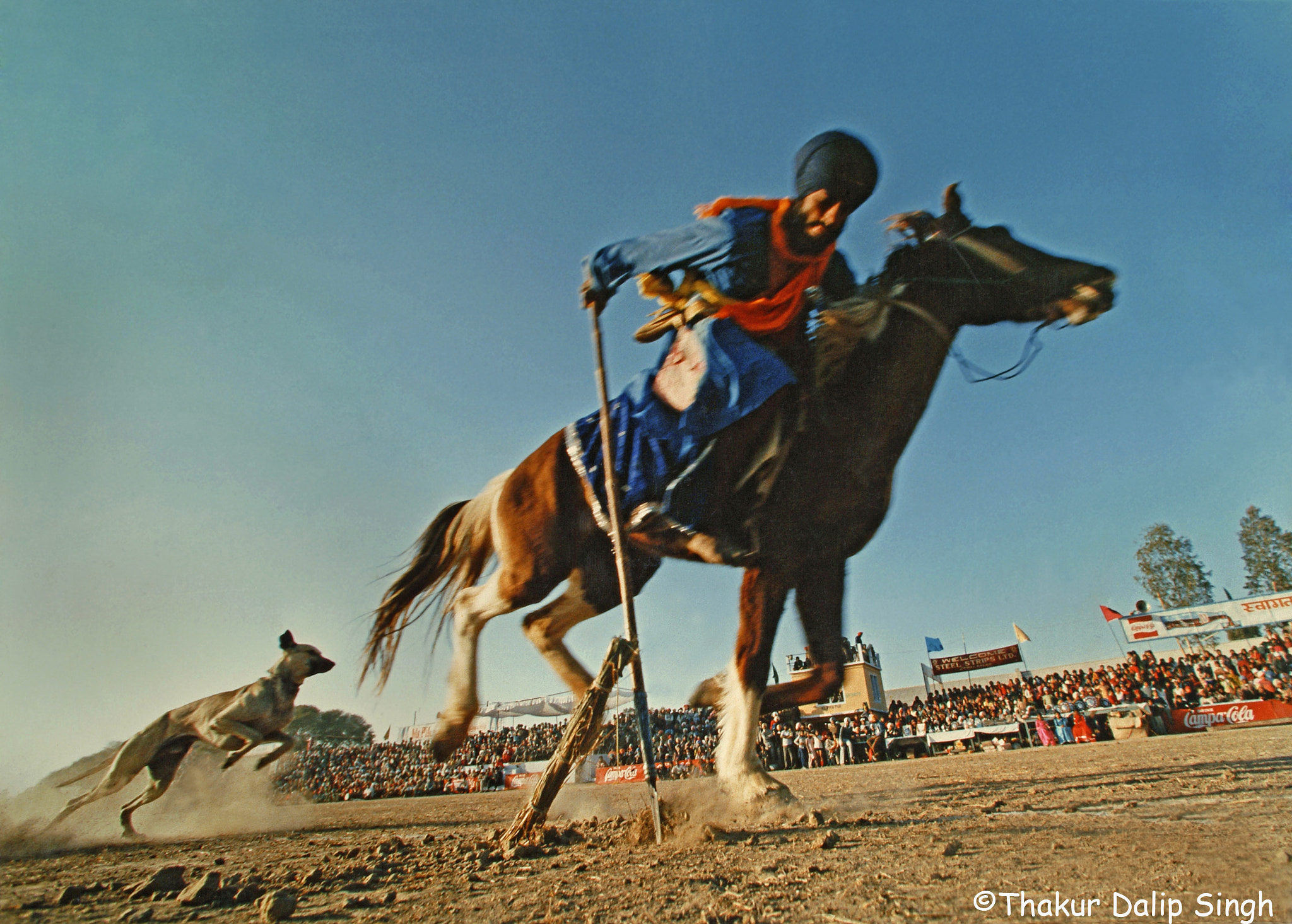
A Sikh warrior riding on horse

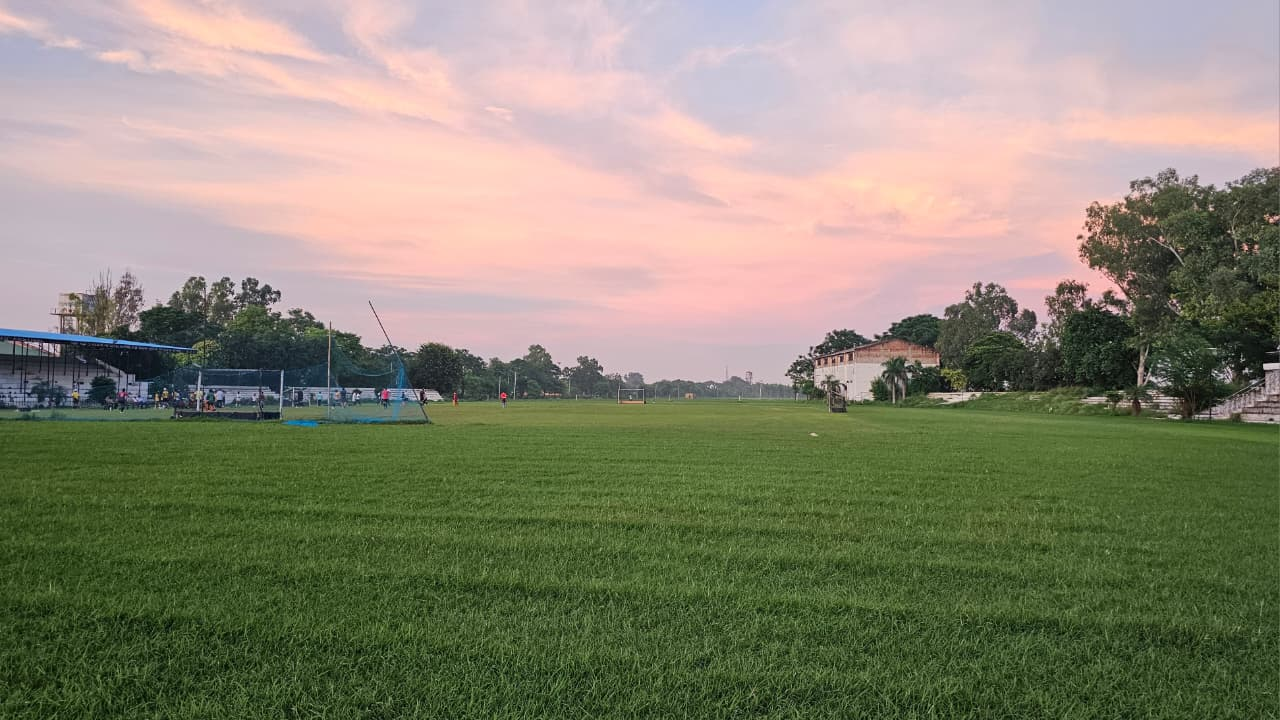
View of the Stadium

== Ban on bull racing ==
In 2014, the supreme court of Indian banned the Bull racing event after the complains of animal cruelty. The petition was filed in 2012 by a Gau Raksha Dal—an organisation that works for the protection of cows and other animals registered a petition against the use of bulls in these games. The Punjab and Haryana high court combined the petition with two others, one by the Malwa Doaba Bulls Welfare Association and another by the Rural Hult Race and Welfare Association, both of which claimed that the Qila Raipur races did not constitute a violation of Section 11 of the Prevention of Cruelty act, as the races did not qualify as performance or exhibition. The court ruled in favour of these two petitions and allowed the races. The presiding judge observed, "At the cost of repetition, it is observed that the Bulls, which are being used for the sports, are well looked after, well nourished and are not treated with any cruelty." This remained intact, until the 2014 Supreme Court order.

== Return of Bullock Cart Racing ==
The Bullock Cart Races made a grand return to the Qila Raipur Rural Olympics 2026, organised by Kila Raipur Sports Society (Patti Sohavia) and sponsored by the State Government of Punjab. After over a decade-long legal freeze, the bullock cart races were revived for the Kila Raipur Rural Olympics under the Punjab Prevention of Cruelty to Animals (Punjab Amendment) Act, 2019 & 2025, which introduced new animal safety standards. Deputy Director Animal Husbandry Ludhiana was supported by Gurinder Singh Grewal (Organiser and Spokesman) from Kila Raipur Sports Society and his team of veterinary doctors, ambulance to ensure compliance and response.

== History and Cultural Impact ==
In villages which formed the first habitation of civilised man rural sports grew out of sheer necessity. The need for cultivating individual strength for labour on the fields, the interdependence within the community and need of defence, joint defence against onslaughts of a common foe and dangerous animals must have given birth to sports like wrestling, running, jumping, weightlifting and such performing arts as of measuring strength by holding wrists, twisting hands. Kabaddi which is another expression of the same spirit has become the mother of games in Punjab.

In order to toughen the frames and steel the minds of his followers Guru Hargobindji had started the tradition of holding wrestling bouts within the precincts of Akal Takht Sahib and it is mostly because of the fillip that he gave and the seal of ethics that he put on them that sports become a proud facet of life in Punjab. On the common grounds of villages, in the fairs, during the festivals, at the hermitages of pirs, graves of preceptors, wrestling became a part of high recreation. Villages adopt and feed wrestlers and also give prizes to them as a matter of honour in Punjab today.

During the Hola Mohalla celebrations at Anandpur Sahib tent pegging competitions, archery, fencing and riding competitions, gymnastic and acrobatic displays which the Nihangs put up and the tournaments held at Diwali have a hoary history. To the Punjabis goes the distinction of organising rural games into tournaments.

In 1933 when the village began to hold competitions in rural sports at Qila Raipur little would have anyone thought that this tournament will become a movement in Punjab.

Today in almost 7000 villages in Punjab, and also overseas (Sikh Games Australia, UK, Canada and US etc) various sports competitions are being held. Rural and NRI folks organise them. It is they who extend all hospitality to the competitors also. In fact these village events have opened the floodgates to sports personnel and infrastructure development in areas they are held.

Before Independence in 1947 major importance was given to Kabaddi and wrestling, after Independence the circle of rural sports also got widened. The rustic "Khido Khoondi" (literally a ball made out of cuttings of cloth and a stick twisted at the end like a flat hockey blade) was replaced by proper field hockey and players from villages, having no facilities beyond uneven grounds to play began to dominate in the game. Twelve of our country's greatest hockey players have come out of a single village called Sansapur in Jalandhar District with almost all of them competing in one or multiple Qila Raipur Rural Olympics editions. Recently not only revival of sports fairs has taken place in Punjab but their number has also increased tremendously. Twenty years ago, for instance, their number was limited to

- Qila Raipur Rural Olympics
- Babehali-di-Chhinj
- Bhaggowal-di-Chhinj
- Shikar-Macchian di-Parewi
- Jaura-Chhatra-di-Parewi
- Bhomey-Wadaley-di-Chhinj
- Shanker-di-Chhinj
- Manann-haaney-di-Chhinj etc.

Now sports meets are held almost in every significant village in Punjab.

Following the Qila Raipur Rural Sports meet footsteps the Kalgidhar Tournament of Kamalpur has also completed half-a-century. Dhudike's Lala Lajpat Rai Memorial Sports Fair has completed three decades. Gujarwal, Mullanpur, Sahnewal, Ghungali Rajputtana Hambla, Dhamto are flourishing. The mini sports meets of Lalto Kalan, Dhurkot, Rauni, Dyalpur, Rurka Kalan, Bhinder Kalan, Duare-ana are gaining stature day by day and act as competition rehearsal for the coveted Qila Raipur Rural Olympics.

Three types of competitions are held during rural meets, Purely rural games : Kabaddi, Wrestling, Weight-lifting etc. Modern sports like athletics, hockey, football, volleyball, cycling, handball etc. Performing sports like acrobatics, twisting an iron-rod by placing it on Adam's apple, passing tractor over the rib-ease, cracking a big stone by placing it on the chest etc. Now another colour is also being added to these sports fairs. They have got intermixed with folk singing when sun sets after the days sports competitions the notes of music begin to emanate and singing continues, sometimes, late in the night. Music contest that was held between Karamjit Dhuri and Jagmohan Kaur at Qila Raipur is still fondly remembered. At the Gujarwal Meet the singing of Parminder Sandhu, Hans Raj Hans and Surinder Chhinda and at fairs of Majha region the notes o Toombi (one-stringed instrument) of Amarjit remain fixed in the minds of the people. Renowned Kila Raipur singer Kanwar Grewal performed at Qila Raipur Rural Olympics on the 19th Feb 2026.

Villagers are not just fond of their own competitions they also like to size-up the skill and power of their animals like bulls, horses, dogs on the sports ground. Bullockcart racing has become a passion in Punjab. Because of a ban on hunting, greyhound-races are held in Punjab by dangling a bait of fake hare before them.

Rural sports embody the heritage, raw power and virility of Punjab, with the Qila Raipur Rural Olympics standing as their ultimate showcase.

== Other Games ==
=== Kabaddi ===
This game is popular even today and is played now by both boys and girls. This was included in the Asian Games also and is popular all over south Asia. The game is played between two teams. A line is drawn between the two teams and each team would send a player across the line. If the player after crossing the line is able to touch a player of the opposite side and came back without being caught, the team doing so would win and a point was added to its score. This process by the player crossing the line has to be performed in a single breath. The team with higher score would be the winner is also known as achi game

=== Rasa Kashi (Tug of War) ===
The men generally played this game. These days women also participate in the game which is played by FIVE teams. A line is drawn between the two teams, each having one end of the rope in its hands. The team, which is able to drag the other team to its side, is the winner team.

=== Akharas ===
These were very popular. Located near the well outside the village, sometimes near the temple. These were the places where the boys learnt wrestling from a Guru or Pehlwan-Wrestler.

=== Martial art ===
This was also a part of the teaching in Akharas, where the boys learnt the use of weapons. Nihangs practice martial arts to keep up the traditions.

=== Kite Flying (Patang Bazi) ===
It is now very much an urbanized game and is popular with the rural folks as well. It has now assumed an International character. Besides the games mentioned above, Chaupat, Shatranj (Chess), camel and bullockcart races, cock fights in addition to Kabutar bazi, chakore bazi and bater bazi are well known.

==== Champions ====
So far, very few International tournaments played between India & Pakistan. Pakistan defeated India in three out of five. Two ended in a draw. The Pakistani Champions were: Noor Khan, Abdul Hameed Qureshi, Nadeem Jameel, Iftikhar Hashmi, and Qaseem Siddiqui. The Indian Champions: Deepali Gode from Kalyan, Varun, Ajay Kaushik, Rohit Mishra (allahabad)(engineer from IT BHU), Vijay Choudhary of Darbhanga, Vivek Baranwal of Varanasi, Upender Kumar, Satyendra Tripathi, and Sandeep Prakash and Pradeep Kumar yYdav of Lucknow Sudhanshu Yadav from Jaipur

==== Variations ====
As an amateur youth sport, gilli-danda has many variations. A common variation is where the striker is allowed to hit the gilli twice, once initially, and then while the gilli is in the air. In some versions, the points a striker scores is dependent on the distance the gilli falls from the striking point. The distance is measured in term s of the length of the danda, or in some cases the length of the gilli. Scoring also depends on how many times the gilli was hit in the air in one strike. If it travels a certain distance with two mid-air strikes, the total point is doubled. In the Philippines, a game known as syatong is similar to gilli-danda. In Italy a similar game known as "Lippa", "Lipe", "Tirolo", or "S-cianco" is shown in the movie Watch Out We Are Mad.

== See also ==
- Punjab Games
