= Punjab Games =

The first (and only) Punjab Games (Note: Also referred to as the "All-Punjab Games" or "Indo-Pak Punjab Games".) were held from 5–11 December 2004, in Patiala city in Indian Punjab.

Some 700 sports persons from both Eastern (Indian) and Western (Pakistani) Punjab competed in the following sports:

- Hockey
- Cycling
- Athletics
- Gymnastics
- Polo
- Handball
- Wrestling
- Badminton
- Volleyball
- Tug of war
- Shooting
- Kabaddi

The Second Punjab Games 2005 were scheduled to be held in Lahore, the provincial capital of Western Punjab in December 2005; and were postponed, and eventually cancelled, due to 2005 Kashmir earthquake.

The Third Punjab Games 2006 were proposed to be held in Jalandhar, however never happened.

== See also ==
- Punjabi sports (India)
- Qila Raipur Sports Festival
