= Ludhiana Bus Rapid Transit System =

Ludhiana BRTS

Overview
- Locale: Ludhiana
- Transit type: Bus rapid transit
- Headquarters: Ludhiana, Punjab, India

Operation
- Operator: Punjab Metro Bus Society

Technical
- System length: 48 km (30 mi)
- Top speed: 21 km/h (13 mph)

Ludhiana BRTS was a bus rapid transit system proposed for the city of Ludhiana in Punjab, India. It was to be 48 km in length, and the project was approved on 22 September 2013. However, the plan was scrapped due to lack of funds by the centre and only funds were raised for the Amritsar BRTS.
