= Ludhiana =

Metropolis in Punjab, India

Ludhiana Ludhiāṇā (Punjabi)
- Metropolis
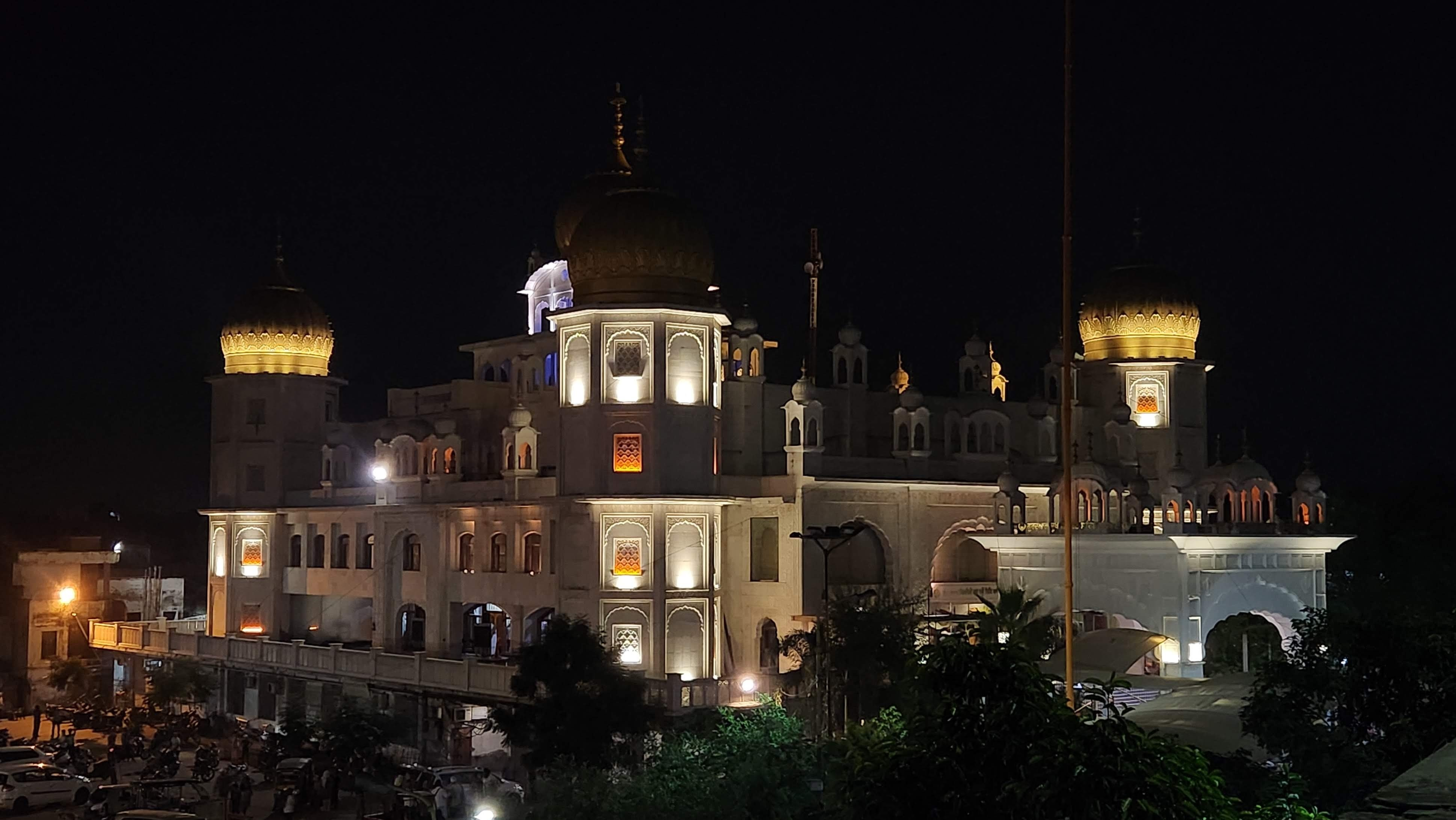
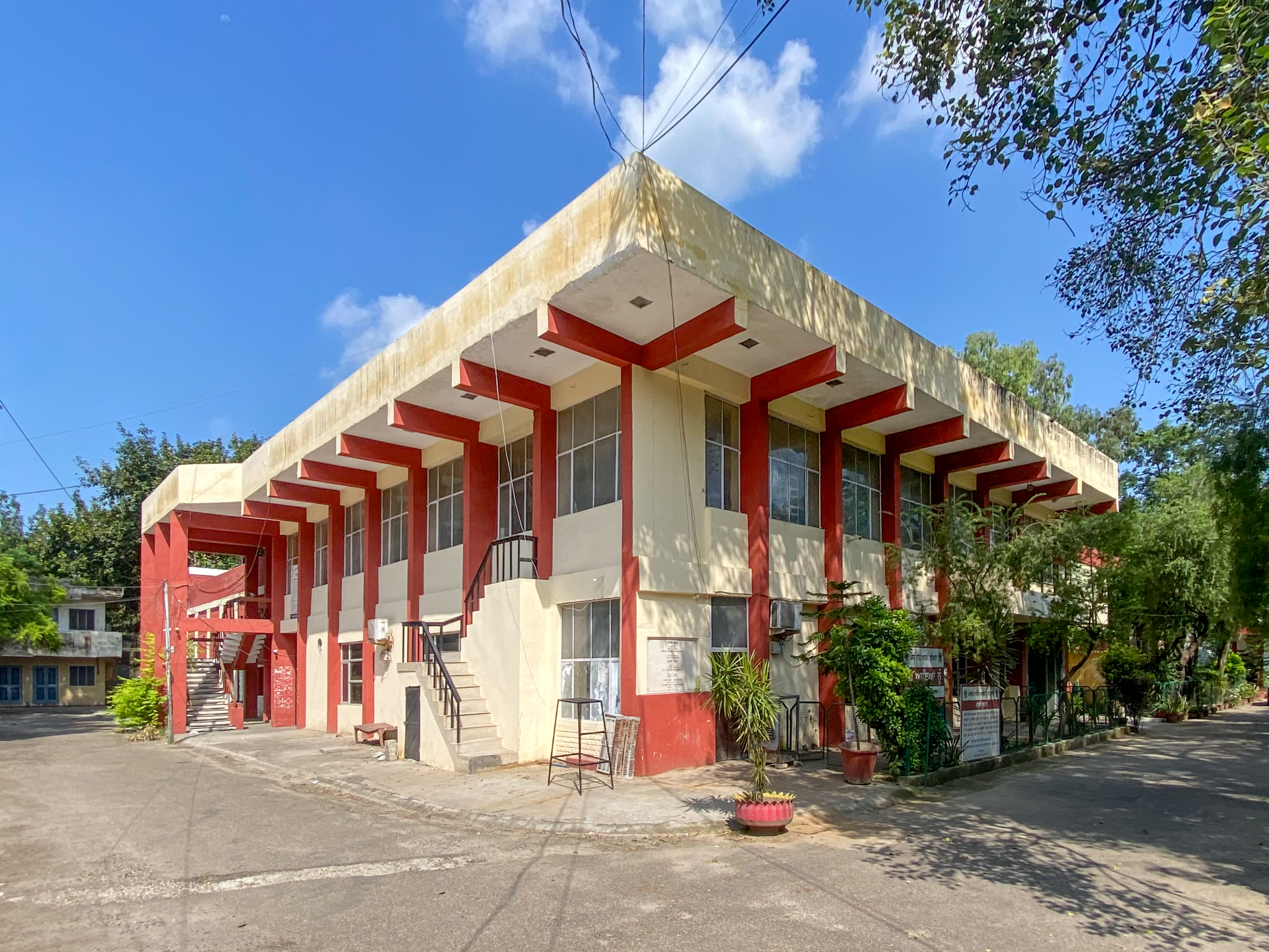
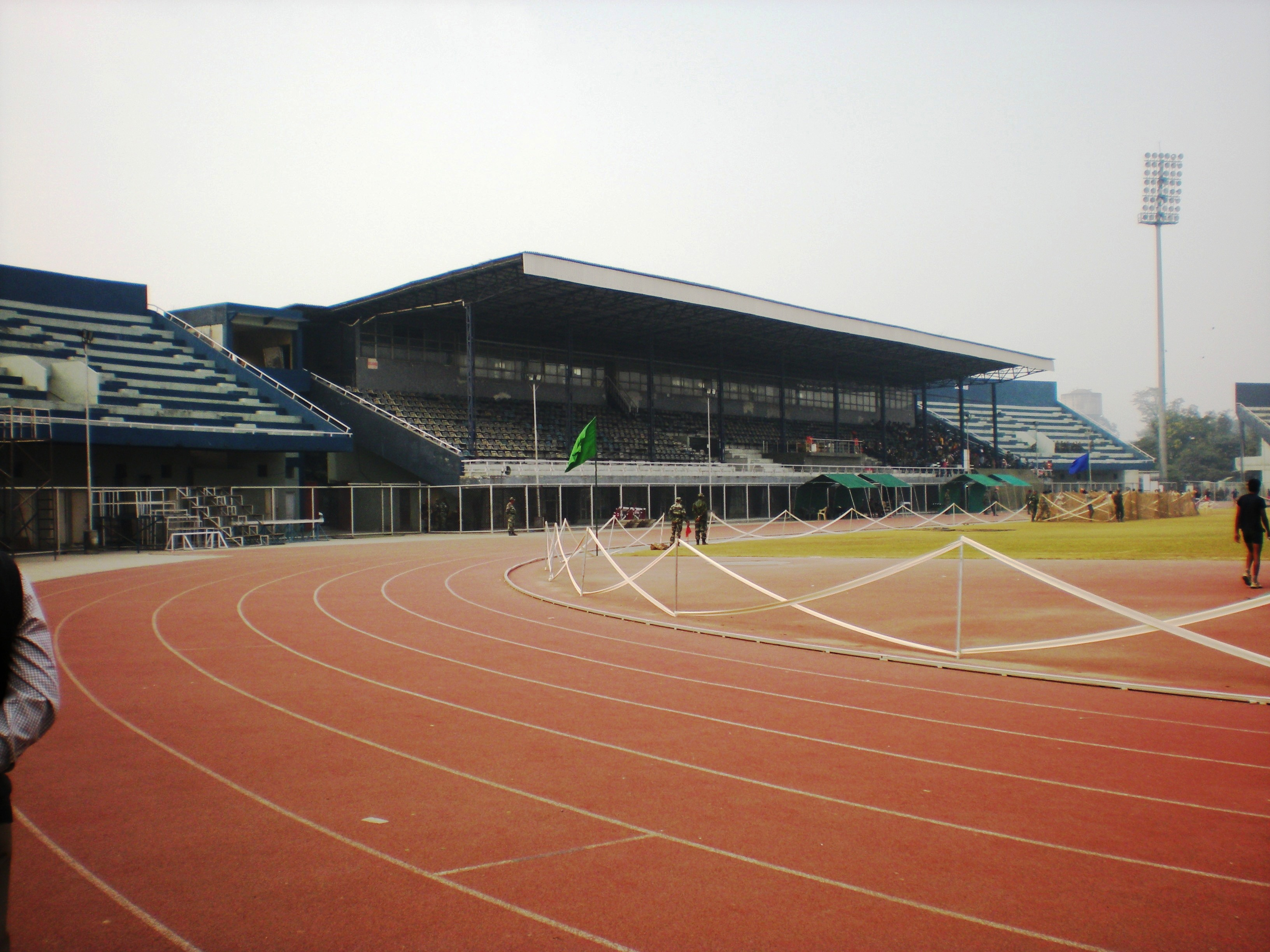
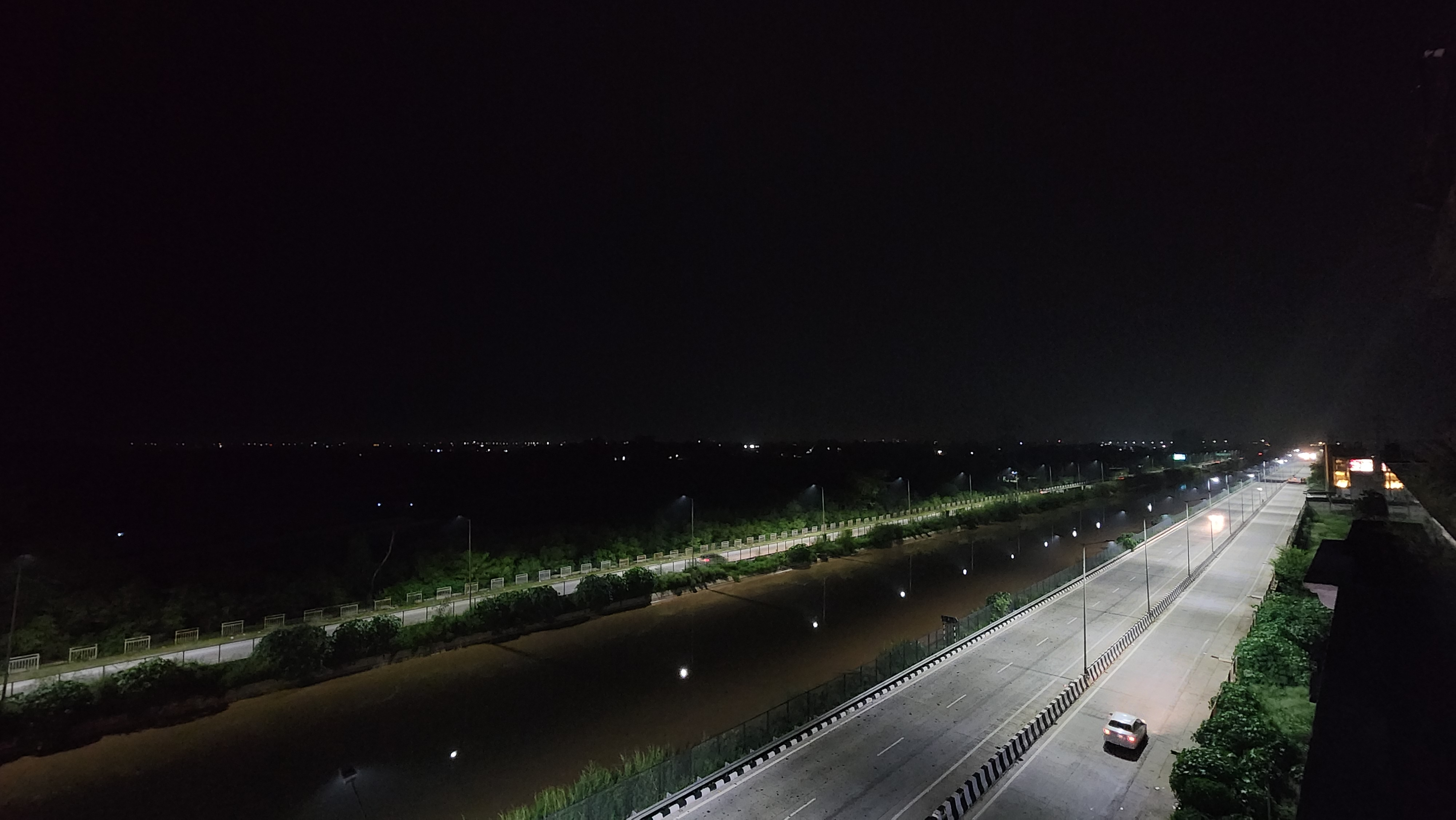
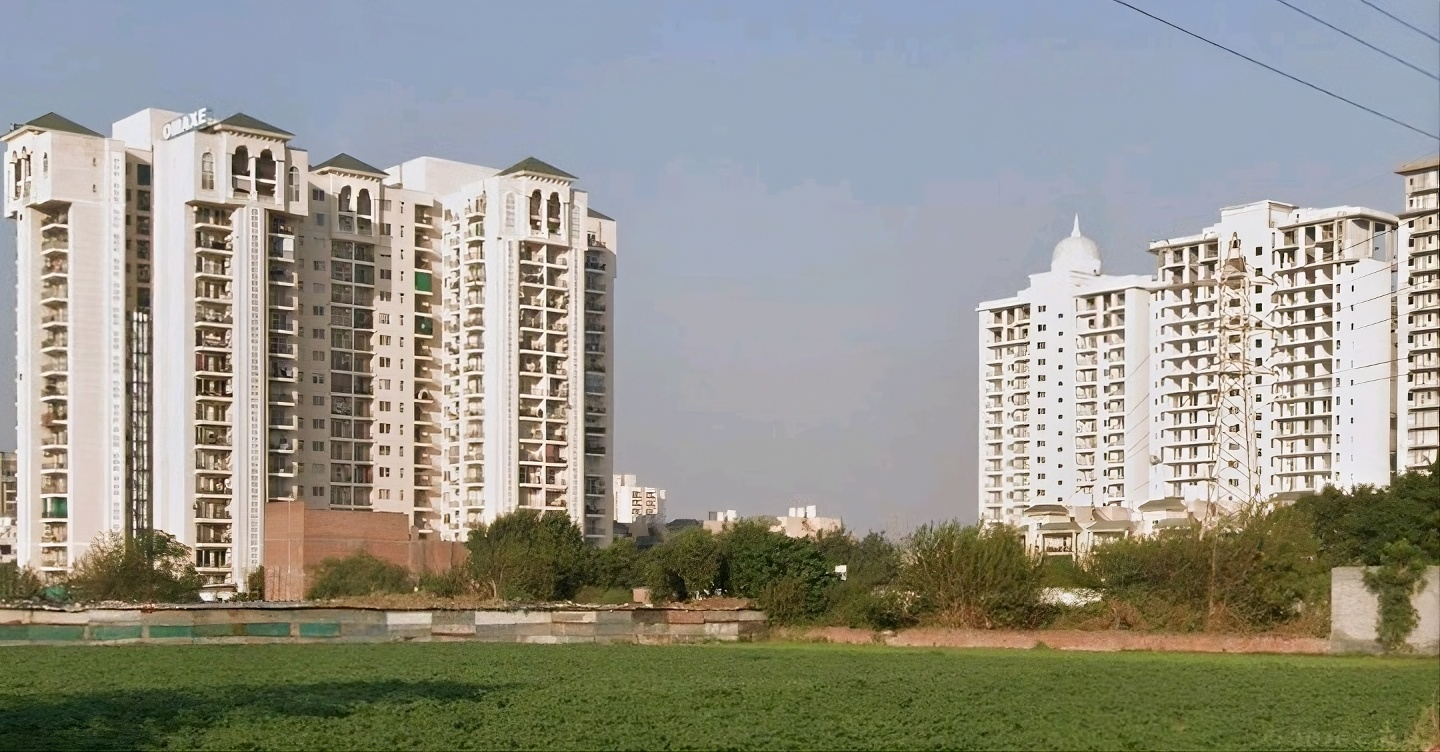
- Gurdwara Dukh Nivaran Sahib Punjabi Bhawan Guru Nanak Stadium Canal Road Omaxe Royal Residency Sukhmani Square

- Location within Punjab Location within India
- Coordinates: 30.9090°N 75.8516°E
- Country: India
- State: Punjab
- District: Ludhiana
- Tehsil: Ludhiana West; Ludhiana East
- Founder: Chief Yusaf Khan and Nihand Khan, under Sikandar Lodhi's reign.
- Named for: Lodhi Dynasty

Government
  - Type: Mayor–Council
  - Body: Ludhiana Municipal Corporation
  - Deputy Commissioner: Himanshu Jain I.A.S
  - Mayor: Inderjit Kaur (AAP)

Area
  - Metropolis: 310 km^{2} (120 sq mi)
  - Metro: 1,182.58 km^{2} (456.60 sq mi)
  - Rank: 1st in Punjab
- Elevation: 247 m (810 ft)

Population (2011)
  - Metropolis: 1,618,879
  - Rank: 22nd in India, 1st in Punjab
  - Density: 5,200/km^{2} (14,000/sq mi)
- Demonym: Ludhianvi
- Time zone: UTC+5:30 (IST)
- PIN: Multiple 141001-141016
- Telephone code: 0161
- Vehicle registration: PB-10, PB-91
- HDI (2018): ▲0.794 (High)
- Website: www.ludhiana.nic.in

Ludhiana (Panjabi: Ludhiāṇā, pronounced [lʊ́d̪͜tɪ̀ɪˈäːɳäː]) is the most populous city in the Indian state of Punjab. The city has an estimated population of 1,618,879 as of the 2011 census and distributed over 310 km^{2} (120 sq mi), making Ludhiana the most densely populated urban centre in the state. It is a major industrial centre of Northern India, referred to as "India's Manchester" by the BBC. It is also known as the commercial capital of Punjab.

It stands on the old bank of Sutlej River, that is now 13 kilometres (8.1 mi) to the south of its present course. The Union Ministry of Housing and Urban Affairs has placed Ludhiana on the 48th position among the top 100 smart cities, and the city has been ranked as one of the easiest cities in India for business according to the World Bank.

== History ==
=== Founding ===
Although the area around present-day Ludhiana had been inhabited since ancient times, the modern city was established during the late fifteenth century under the Lodi dynasty of the Delhi Sultanate. Prior to its foundation, the region comprised several agricultural settlements located along the southern bank of the Sutlej River, whose course has since shifted further north.

During the rule of the Tughlaq dynasty, a fort was constructed to protect the strategic route linking Delhi with north-western India. The fort was captured by the Khokhar ruler Jasrat during his campaign in Punjab in 1421–22, illustrating the declining authority of the Delhi Sultanate in the region.

Ludhiana was founded in 1480 during the reign of the Lodi dynasty. According to tradition, Sultan Sikandar Lodi sent two military commanders, Yusuf Khan and Nihad Khan, to restore Lodi authority in Punjab. While Yusuf Khan crossed the Sutlej River and established Sultanpur Lodhi, Nihad Khan founded Ludhiana at the village of Mir Hota..

The city's name was originally Lodi-ana, meaning "the town of the Lodis", which gradually evolved into Lodiana and eventually Ludhiana.

The Lodhi Fort, popularly known as Purana Qila, is the only surviving monument from the city's foundation. It was repaired during the reign of Maharaja Ranjit Singh and later maintained by the British administration before falling into disrepair after independence. In December 2013, it was declared a state-protected monument by the Government of Punjab.

=== Mughal period ===
Following the establishment of the Mughal Empire in 1526, Ludhiana became part of the Lahore Subah. Owing to its location on important commercial routes between Delhi and Lahore, the town developed as a regional trading centre for agricultural produce, textiles and handicrafts. Local administration was carried out through Mughal officials, while the surrounding countryside remained predominantly agrarian.

The city was also influenced by the growth of Sikhism. Several Sikh Gurus, including Guru Hargobind, Guru Tegh Bahadur and Guru Gobind Singh, travelled through the region, contributing to the religious significance of nearby settlements.

=== Sikh Confederacy ===
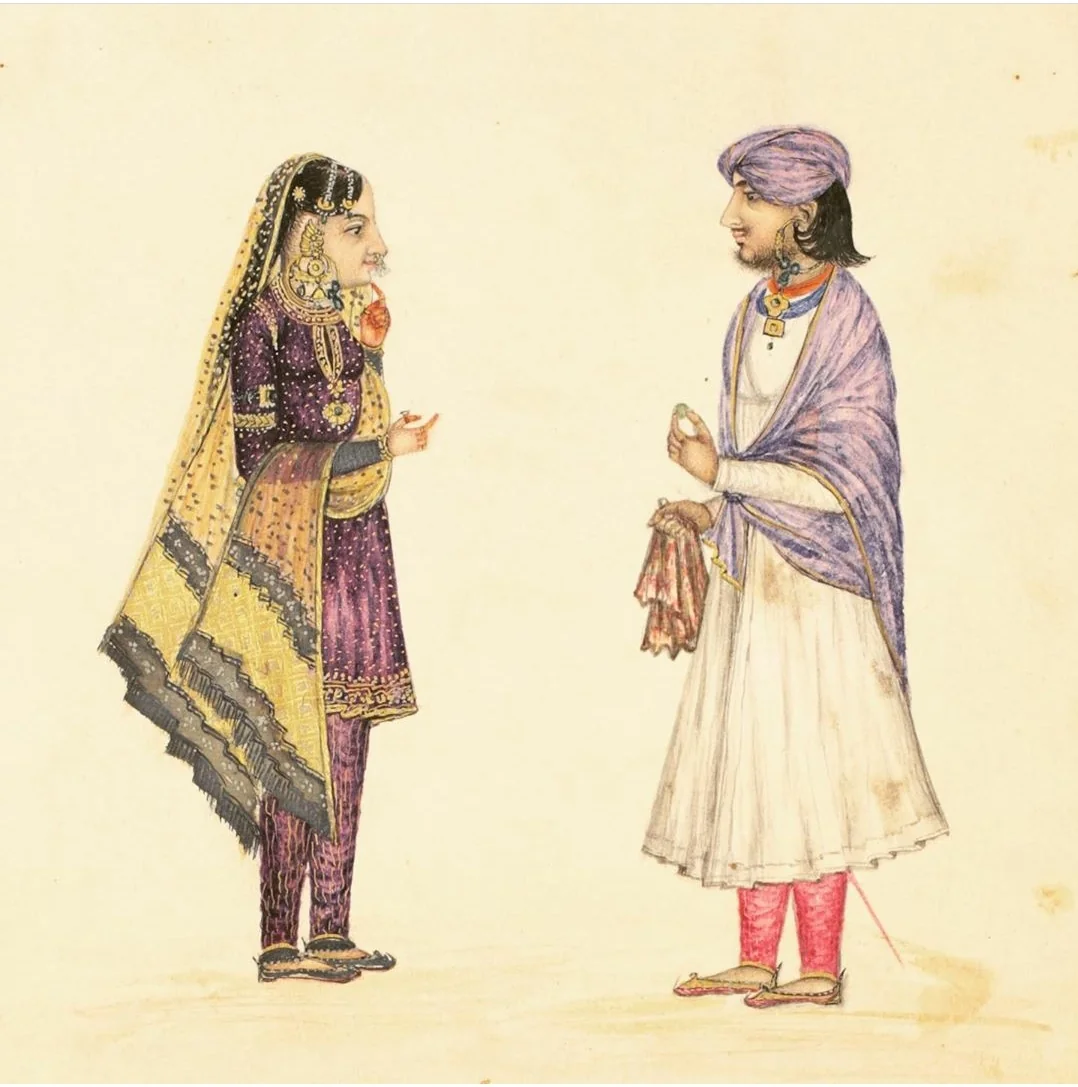
"Kunchuns of Loodhiana" – Painting from 19th century

During the eighteenth century, Mughal authority in Punjab weakened following repeated invasions by Ahmad Shah Durrani. Ludhiana changed hands several times between Afghan forces and various Sikh misls. By the late eighteenth century, the area had come under the influence of the Phulkian chiefs and the Cis-Sutlej states, becoming an important frontier settlement in central Punjab.

=== British rule ===
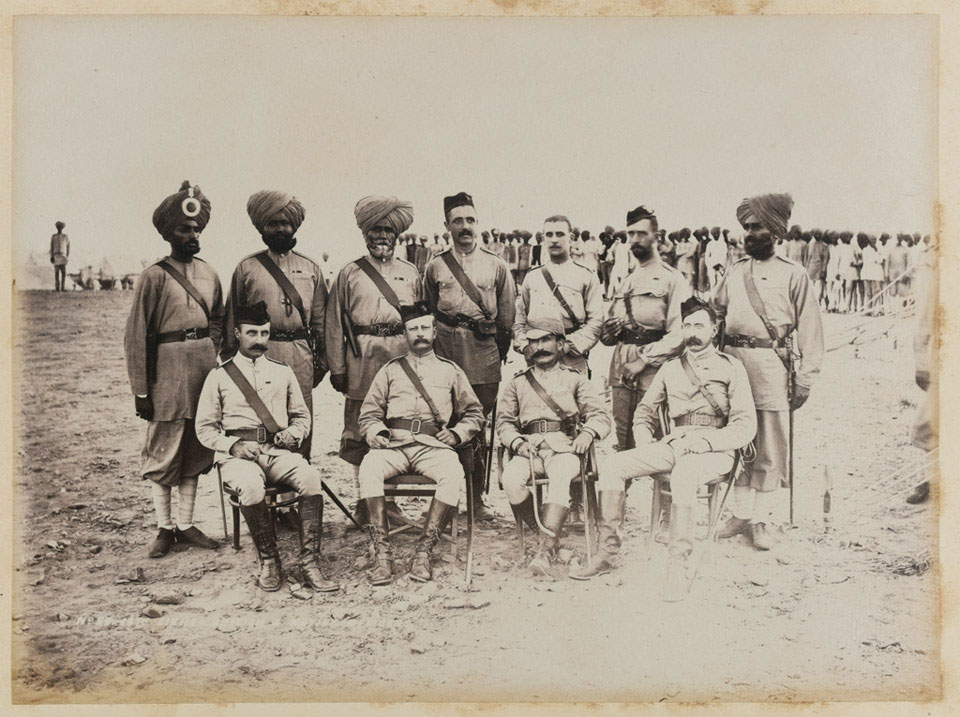
15th (Ludhiana) Regiment of Bengal Native Infantry in 1884

Following the Treaty of Amritsar between the British East India Company and Maharaja Ranjit Singh, Ludhiana became an important British military cantonment on the southern bank of the Sutlej River. The British established a political agency in the city to supervise the Cis-Sutlej princely states and maintain diplomatic relations with the Sikh Empire.

After the First Anglo-Sikh War (1845–46) and the annexation of Punjab in 1849, Ludhiana became part of British Punjab. Railways, roads and irrigation projects transformed the town into a major commercial centre. Industries relating to hosiery, textiles, metalworking and agricultural machinery began to emerge during the late nineteenth century.

Educational institutions, missionary schools and municipal administration expanded rapidly during this period. The Ludhiana Municipality was established in 1867, providing civic services and urban governance.

=== Indian independence movement ===
Ludhiana was an active centre of political and revolutionary activity during the Indian independence movement. The district contributed significantly to the Ghadar movement, with many emigrants from Ludhiana who had settled in North America joining the Ghadar Party. Several revolutionaries returned to Punjab during the First World War to organise an armed uprising against British rule, leading to arrests and prosecutions in the Lahore Conspiracy Case.

The district is closely associated with the revolutionary Kartar Singh Sarabha, one of the youngest leaders of the Ghadar movement, whose sacrifice later inspired Bhagat Singh and other freedom fighters.

Ludhiana also witnessed widespread participation in the Non-Cooperation Movement, Civil Disobedience Movement and Quit India Movement. Public meetings, processions, strikes and the boycott of foreign goods were organised throughout the district, while many local political activists were imprisoned for anti-colonial activities.

=== Partition and post-independence ===
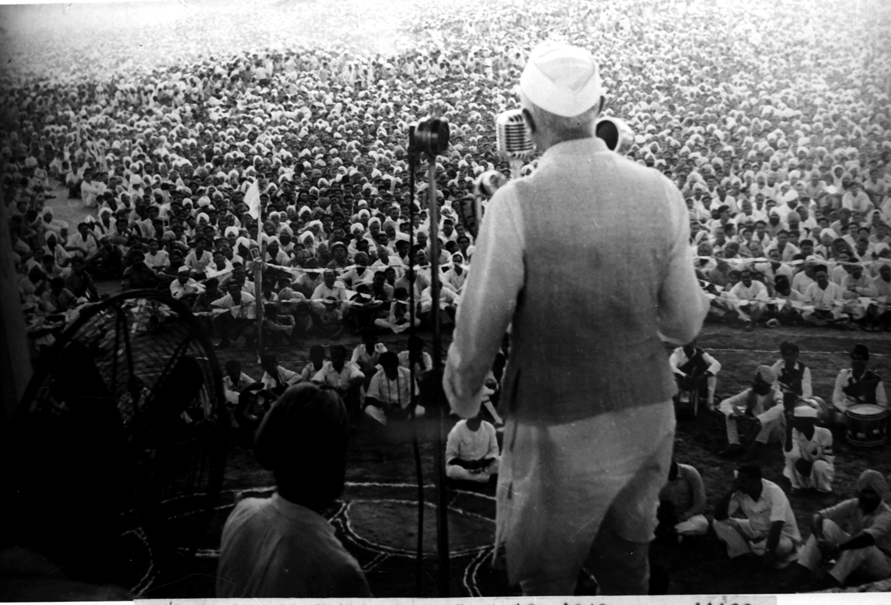
PM Jawaharlal Nehru addressing public meeting in Ludhiana in the year 1949

The Partition of India in 1947 transformed Ludhiana's demographic and economic landscape. The city received tens of thousands of Hindu and Sikh refugees from West Punjab in present-day Pakistan, while much of its Muslim population migrated in the opposite direction.

The refugee population included skilled artisans, industrialists and entrepreneurs who established small-scale manufacturing units. Their contribution accelerated the growth of the bicycle, hosiery, sewing machine, machine-tool, auto component and textile industries, earning Ludhiana the nickname "Manchester of India".

During the second half of the twentieth century, Ludhiana expanded rapidly as Punjab's principal industrial and commercial centre. The establishment of institutions such as Punjab Agricultural University in 1962 further strengthened its importance in agricultural research and education. In the twenty-first century, the city has continued to expand as a centre for manufacturing, trade, healthcare and higher education, while also being selected under the Government of India's Smart Cities Mission.

== Geography ==
Ludhiana is located at 30°54′N 75°51′E. It has an average elevation of 244 metres (801 ft). Ludhiana City, to its residents, consists of the Old City and the New City. The new city primarily consists of the Civil Lines area which was historically known as the residential and official quarters of the colonial British encampment.

The Old Fort was at the banks of the Sutlej (and now houses the College of Textile Engineering). Legend has it that a tunnel connects it to the fort in Phillaur– although why this should be is debatable, as the Sutlej was the traditional dividing line between the principalities, often occupied by enemy forces (see History section).

The tree of largest natural extraction was the kikar, or Acacia Indica, but has been supplanted by the eucalyptus, transplanted from rural Australia in the late 1950s by the Chief Minister Partap Singh Kairon.

=== Climate ===
Ludhiana

Climate chart (precipitation, max. and min. temperature)
J	F	M	A	M	J	J	A	S	O	N	D
28 18 6	36 22 9	27 27 13	18 35 18	21 39 24	87 38 26	217 34 27	187 33 26	138 33 24	19 32 17	3.9 27 11	8.6 21 7
- █ Average max. and min. temperatures in °C
- █ Precipitation totals in mm
- Source: IMD
Imperial conversion
J	F	M	A	M	J	J	A	S	O	N	D
1.1 64 43	1.4 71 48	1.1 81 55	0.7 95 65	0.8 102 74	3.4 100 79	8.5 93 80	7.4 92 79	5.4 92 74	0.7 89 63	0.2 81 52	0.3 70 44
- █ Average max. and min. temperatures in °F
- █ Precipitation totals in inches

Ludhiana features a relatively dry monsoon-influenced humid subtropical climate (Cwa) under the Köppen climate classification, although bordering on a hot semi-arid climate (BSh), with three defined seasons; summer, monsoon and winter. Ludhiana on an average sees roughly 809.3 millimetres (31.86 in) of precipitation annually. The official weather station for the city is in the compound of the Civil Surgeon's Office to the west of Ludhiana. Weather records here date back to 1 August 1868.

Ludhiana has one of the worst air pollution problems in India since 2011, with particulate matter being over six times the World Health Organization recommended standard, making it the 13th most polluted city in the world. Industrial water pollution is also of significant concern in portions of Ludhiana, notably along the Budha Dariya.

Climate data for Ludhiana Airport (1991–2020 normals, extremes 1868–present)
Month	Jan	Feb	Mar	Apr	May	Jun	Jul	Aug	Sep	Oct	Nov	Dec	Year
Record high °C (°F)	29.2 (84.6)	33.3 (91.9)	41.1 (106.0)	46.1 (115.0)	48.3 (118.9)	47.9 (118.2)	47.8 (118.0)	44.4 (111.9)	41.7 (107.1)	40.0 (104.0)	35.8 (96.4)	29.4 (84.9)	48.3 (118.9)
Mean daily maximum °C (°F)	17.9 (64.2)	21.8 (71.2)	27.3 (81.1)	34.8 (94.6)	39.0 (102.2)	38.0 (100.4)	34.1 (93.4)	33.4 (92.1)	33.1 (91.6)	31.9 (89.4)	27.1 (80.8)	20.9 (69.6)	29.9 (85.8)
Daily mean °C (°F)	12.0 (53.6)	15.3 (59.5)	20.2 (68.4)	26.5 (79.7)	31.3 (88.3)	32.1 (89.8)	30.4 (86.7)	29.7 (85.5)	28.3 (82.9)	24.6 (76.3)	19.2 (66.6)	13.9 (57.0)	23.6 (74.5)
Mean daily minimum °C (°F)	6.1 (43.0)	8.7 (47.7)	13.0 (55.4)	18.2 (64.8)	23.5 (74.3)	26.1 (79.0)	26.6 (79.9)	25.9 (78.6)	23.5 (74.3)	17.3 (63.1)	11.2 (52.2)	6.8 (44.2)	17.2 (63.0)
Record low °C (°F)	−2.2 (28.0)	−1.1 (30.0)	1.4 (34.5)	7.1 (44.8)	11.7 (53.1)	18.0 (64.4)	17.4 (63.3)	18.0 (64.4)	15.2 (59.4)	8.4 (47.1)	0.3 (32.5)	−1.1 (30.0)	−2.2 (28.0)
Average rainfall mm (inches)	28.0 (1.10)	36.2 (1.43)	27.0 (1.06)	17.5 (0.69)	21.2 (0.83)	87.4 (3.44)	217.1 (8.55)	187.2 (7.37)	138.4 (5.45)	18.8 (0.74)	3.9 (0.15)	8.6 (0.34)	791.1 (31.15)
Average rainy days	2.1	2.9	2.1	1.7	1.7	4.9	8.6	8.7	5.5	1.0	0.4	0.9	40.6
Average relative humidity (%) (at 17:30 IST)	66	58	48	27	26	42	67	73	65	50	50	62	53
Average dew point °C (°F)	8 (46)	12 (54)	15 (59)	16 (61)	19 (66)	23 (73)	26 (79)	26 (79)	24 (75)	19 (66)	13 (55)	10 (50)	18 (64)
Average ultraviolet index	4	5	7	8	9	9	8	7	7	6	5	4	7
Source 1: India Meteorological DepartmentTime and Date (dewpoints, 2005-2015)
Source 2: Weather Atlas

Climate data for Ludhiana (Punjab Agricultural University) 1981–2010 normals, extremes 1966–2011
Month	Jan	Feb	Mar	Apr	May	Jun	Jul	Aug	Sep	Oct	Nov	Dec	Year
Record high °C (°F)	29.2 (84.6)	30.0 (86.0)	37.0 (98.6)	44.0 (111.2)	46.6 (115.9)	46.0 (114.8)	43.6 (110.5)	40.0 (104.0)	38.2 (100.8)	37.6 (99.7)	35.4 (95.7)	27.2 (81.0)	46.6 (115.9)
Mean daily maximum °C (°F)	18.1 (64.6)	21.1 (70.0)	26.6 (79.9)	34.5 (94.1)	38.4 (101.1)	38.2 (100.8)	34.4 (93.9)	33.5 (92.3)	33.5 (92.3)	31.9 (89.4)	26.8 (80.2)	21.0 (69.8)	29.8 (85.6)
Mean daily minimum °C (°F)	5.7 (42.3)	7.8 (46.0)	12.4 (54.3)	17.4 (63.3)	22.8 (73.0)	25.9 (78.6)	26.3 (79.3)	25.8 (78.4)	23.2 (73.8)	16.7 (62.1)	10.9 (51.6)	6.7 (44.1)	16.8 (62.2)
Record low °C (°F)	−1.6 (29.1)	0.0 (32.0)	2.1 (35.8)	9.0 (48.2)	12.0 (53.6)	18.0 (64.4)	20.5 (68.9)	20.6 (69.1)	14.5 (58.1)	8.4 (47.1)	4.3 (39.7)	0.2 (32.4)	−1.6 (29.1)
Average rainfall mm (inches)	28.0 (1.10)	30.4 (1.20)	24.2 (0.95)	21.9 (0.86)	26.5 (1.04)	68.6 (2.70)	221.4 (8.72)	195.3 (7.69)	101.6 (4.00)	12.9 (0.51)	6.9 (0.27)	14.1 (0.56)	751.7 (29.59)
Average rainy days	2.3	2.6	2.3	2.3	2.3	4.2	8.4	8.0	4.3	0.9	0.5	1.1	39.0
Average relative humidity (%) (at 17:30 IST)	67	62	52	30	28	42	66	72	63	49	51	62	54
Source: India Meteorological Department

== Demographics ==
Historical population
Year	Pop.	±%
1901	48,649	—
1911	44,170	−9.2%
1921	51,880	+17.5%
1931	68,586	+32.2%
1941	111,639	+62.8%
1951	153,795	+37.8%
1961	244,032	+58.7%
1971	401,176	+64.4%
1981	607,052	+51.3%
1991	1,042,740	+71.8%
2001	1,398,467	+34.1%
2011	1,618,879	+15.8%

=== Literacy ===
As per the 2011 census, Ludhiana had a population of 1,618,879. The literacy rate was 86.50 per cent, and the population consisted of 950,123 males and 743,530 females.

=== Religion ===
Religion in Ludhiana City (2011)
Religion	Percent
Hinduism	65.96%
Sikhism	28.75%
Islam	2.81%
Jainism	1.05%
Christianity	0.68%
Other or not stated	0.75%

With around 66% adherents according to 2011 Indian Census, Hinduism is the predominant religion of Ludhiana, followed by Sikhism with 29% of the population. Islam is followed by 2.8% and Christianity by less than 1%.

Prior to India's partition, Ludhiana had a population of 111,639 with Muslims being the majority with 62.9%. The Hindus were 31.1% and Sikhs 4.7%. It changed post-partition with a drastic reduction in Muslim percentage and simultaneous increase in Hindu and Sikh population, owing to migration of people between West and East Punjab.

Religious groups in Ludhiana City (1868–2011) (Note: 1881–1941: Data for the entirety of the town of Ludhiana, which included Ludhiana Municipality, Ludhiana Cantonment, and Ludhiana Civil Lines.)
Religious group	1868		1881		1891		1901		1911		1921		1931		1941		2011	
Religious group	Pop.	%	Pop.	%	Pop.	%	Pop.	%	Pop.	%	Pop.	%	Pop.	%	Pop.	%	Pop.	%
Islam	27,860	69.68%	29,045	65.77%	30,257	65.3%	31,472	64.69%	27,197	61.57%	30,921	59.6%	42,981	62.67%	70,182	62.87%	45,473	2.81%
Hinduism	10,208	25.53%	12,969	29.37%	13,871	29.94%	15,249	31.34%	14,079	31.87%	17,092	32.95%	20,758 (Note: 1931–1941: Including Ad-Dharmis)	30.27%	34,704	31.09%	1,067,744	65.96%
Christianity	79	0.2%	—N/a	—N/a	328	0.71%	368	0.76%	552	1.25%	631	1.22%	1,049	1.53%	596	0.53%	11,044	0.68%
Sikhism	45	0.11%	1,077	2.44%	1,065	2.3%	756	1.55%	1,684	3.81%	2,550	4.92%	3,445	5.02%	5,273	4.72%	465,393	28.75%
Buddhism	0	0%	—N/a	—N/a	0	0%	0	0%	0	0%	0	0%	4	0.01%	—N/a	—N/a	1,700	0.11%
Jainism	—N/a	—N/a	752	1.7%	813	1.75%	804	1.65%	658	1.49%	667	1.29%	344	0.5%	605	0.54%	16,941	1.05%
Zoroastrianism	—N/a	—N/a	—N/a	—N/a	0	0%	0	0%	0	0%	19	0.04%	5	0.01%	—N/a	—N/a	—N/a	—N/a
Others	1,791	4.48%	320	0.72%	0	0%	0	0%	0	0%	0	0%	0	0%	279	0.25%	10,584	0.65%
Total population	39,983	100%	44,163	100%	46,334	100%	48,649	100%	44,170	100%	51,880	100%	68,586	100%	111,639	100%	1,618,879	100%

=== Language ===
Distribution of mother tongues in Ludhiana city according to the 2011 Census of India.
1. Punjabi (67.0%)
2. Hindi (29.2%)
3. Bhojpuri (1.35%)
4. Other languages (2.41%)

According to the 2011 Census of India, Punjabi is the predominant mother tongue in Ludhiana, spoken by 67.00% of the city's population. Hindi is the second most common first language, accounting for 29.24% of the population, while Bhojpuri is spoken by 1.35%. The remaining 2.41% of residents reported other mother tongues, reflecting the city's linguistic diversity.

As Punjab's largest industrial and manufacturing centre, Ludhiana has experienced significant in-migration from other parts of India, particularly Uttar Pradesh, Bihar, Uttarakhand and Himachal Pradesh. Consequently, Hindi serves as an important link language in commerce, industry and inter-state communication, while Bhojpuri and several other regional languages are also spoken among migrant communities.

Punjabi, written in the Gurmukhi script, is the official language of Punjab and is the principal language of administration, education and local governance in Ludhiana. English is widely used for higher education, judicial proceedings, business and official correspondence, while Hindi is commonly understood and spoken throughout the city owing to its diverse population.

== Administration ==
The municipal administration of Ludhiana began with the establishment of the Municipal Council in 1870. Following the Partition of India in 1947, the city gained strategic importance because of its central location in the reorganised Punjab and emerged as a major industrial centre. Following rapid population growth and urban expansion, the Municipal Corporation of Ludhiana was constituted in 1976 under the Punjab Municipal Act, 1976, replacing the earlier municipal council. It corporation is responsible for the provision and maintenance of civic infrastructure and public services, including roads, street lighting, water supply, sewerage, sanitation, solid waste management, public health, parks, and urban planning.

The administration of the Ludhiana Municipal Corporation is headed by the Municipal Commissioner, Mr. Ojasvi Alankar, IAS. The Corporation governs an area of 159.37 km² (61.53 sq mi)

Zone	Zonal office	Number of sub-zones	Number of wards
Zone A	Mata Rani Chowk, Ludhiana	4	25
Zone B	Backside Shingar Cinema, Ludhiana	4	27
Zone C	Near Gill Chowk, Ludhiana	4	19
Zone D	Sarabha Nagar, Ludhiana	4	30

Note: The official zonal chart allocates several wards partly between two zones. These include Wards 28, 43, 49, 57, and 63, which are marked as “Partly”. Consequently, the total ward allocations across all zones (101) exceed the corporation’s total of 95 wards.

The Ludhiana Municipal Corporation administers a range of departments responsible for civic governance and municipal services. These include the Accounts and Audit, Advertisement, Building and Roads (B&R), Complaints and Enquiry, Computerisation Branch, Drawing and Building, Establishment, Estate, Health and Sanitation, Horticulture, Legal, Licensing Branch, Lights, Operations and Maintenance (O&M), Police, Projects Division, Sales and Property, Tehbazari, and Workshop departments.

=== Municipal finance ===
According to financial data published on the CityFinance Portal of the Ministry of Housing and Urban Affairs, the Ludhiana Municipal Corporation reported total revenue receipts of ₹666 crore and total expenditure of ₹736 crore during the financial year 2022–23. Tax revenue contributed approximately ₹142 crore (21.3%) of the corporation's total revenue receipts, while grants from the Union and state governments amounted to ₹354 crore, accounting for more than half of the total revenue. The corporation recorded a revenue deficit during the year, with expenditure exceeding receipts by around ₹70 crore. Property tax, user charges, assigned revenues, and government grants constitute the principal sources of municipal income, while major expenditure heads include public health, sanitation, roads, water supply, street lighting, and other civic services.

== Politics ==
Ludhiana is the administrative headquarters of Ludhiana district and is one of the principal political centres of Punjab. The city is represented at the municipal, state and national levels through the Ludhiana Municipal Corporation, the Punjab Legislative Assembly and the Parliament of India, respectively.

=== Parliamentary representation ===
Ludhiana is represented in the Lok Sabha by the Ludhiana Lok Sabha constituency, one of the 13 parliamentary constituencies in Punjab. The constituency comprises six assembly constituencies located entirely within the city. Since the 2024 Indian general election, it has been represented by Amrinder Singh Raja Warring of the Indian National Congress, who defeated Ravneet Singh Bittu of the Bharatiya Janata Party by 20,942 votes.

=== Punjab Legislative Assembly ===
Ludhiana is divided into six assembly constituencies, all of which form part of the Ludhiana Lok Sabha constituency.

Constituency No.	Assembly constituency	Reservation	Electors (2017)
60	Ludhiana East	None	182,228
61	Ludhiana South	None	149,582
62	Atam Nagar	None	157,578
63	Ludhiana Central	None	147,646
64	Ludhiana West	None	176,915
65	Ludhiana North	None	181,931

As of the 2022 Punjab Legislative Assembly election, the six assembly constituencies are represented by members belonging to the Aam Aadmi Party.

=== Municipal politics ===
The city is governed by the Ludhiana Municipal Corporation, consisting of elected members representing municipal wards. The corporation elects the Mayor, while the Municipal Commissioner, appointed by the Government of Punjab, serves as the executive head of the corporation. Municipal elections are ordinarily held every five years.

Ludhiana has historically witnessed multi-party competition involving the Indian National Congress, Shiromani Akali Dal, Bharatiya Janata Party and, in recent years, the Aam Aadmi Party. The city's political landscape has frequently shifted between these parties in both municipal and legislative elections, making it one of Punjab's most closely contested urban centres.

=== Political significance ===
As Punjab's largest city by population and one of northern India's principal industrial centres, Ludhiana plays a significant role in the state's politics. Electoral issues in the city commonly include industrial development, urban infrastructure, pollution control, traffic management, employment, civic amenities, and the welfare of migrant workers. The city's sizeable industrial workforce, business community and urban middle class make it an influential electoral battleground in both state and parliamentary elections.

== Economy ==
The World Bank ranked Ludhiana as the city in India with the best business environment in 2009 and 2013. The riches are brought mostly by small-scale industrial units, which produce industrial goods, machine parts, auto parts, household appliances, hosiery, apparel, and garments. Ludhiana is Asia's largest hub for bicycle manufacturing and produces more than 50% of India's bicycle production each year. Ludhiana produces 60% of India's tractor parts and a large portion of auto and two-wheeler parts. Many parts used in German cars such as Mercedes and BMW are exclusively produced in Ludhiana to satisfy the world requirement. It is one of the largest manufacturer of domestic sewing machines. Hand tools and industrial equipment are other specialties.

The apparel industry of Ludhiana, popularly known as Ludhiana hosiery industry provides employment to numerous people and produces India's largest share of winter clothing. It is especially known for its woollen sweaters and cotton T-shirts with the majority of India's woollen clothing brands being based here. Ludhiana is also famous for its industry of shawls and stoles and satisfies the demand of major domestic and international brands. As a result of its dominance in the textile industry it is often dubbed as the Manchester of India. Ludhiana is now sourcing production to major corporate brands all over India. Cloths manufactured here sell in big brand showrooms. Ludhiana also has a growing IT sector with multiple software services and product companies having development centres in the city. In April 2021, BizMerlinHR, a HR management software firm with development centre in Ludhiana was awarded Cool Vendor in HCM for 2021 by industry analyst Gartner.

Ludhiana was home to the Ludhiana Stock Exchange Association. LSE was situated on NH95 (Chandigarh-Ferozepur Highway) in Feroze Gandhi market near Mini Secretariat Ludhiana. The association is now defunct.

== Attractions ==
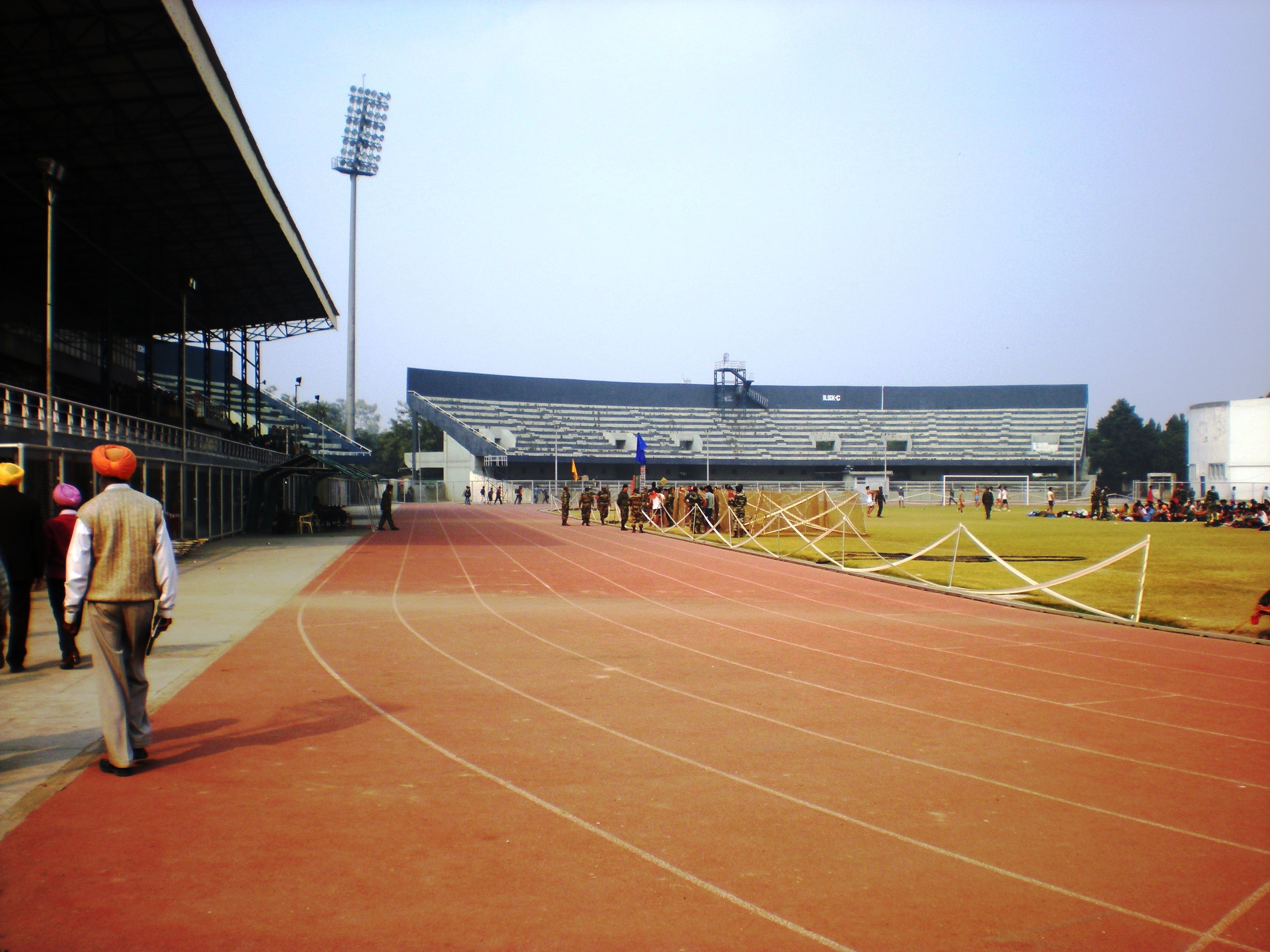
Guru Nanak Stadium

=== Sports ===
Guru Nanak Stadium in Ludhiana hosts a number of sporting events including athletics, football, badminton, basketball, gymnastics, handball, kabaddi, table tennis, volleyball, as well as other indoor games.

Kabaddi

Kabaddi world cup finals have been played twice in Guru Nanak Stadium Ludhiana. The stadium often hosts high-profile Kabaddi matches.

Football

Various competitions like finals of National Games Football Matches (2001) and I-League matches of clubs like Minerva Punjab FC (now RoundGlass Punjab Football Club) have been played in Guru Nanak Stadium.

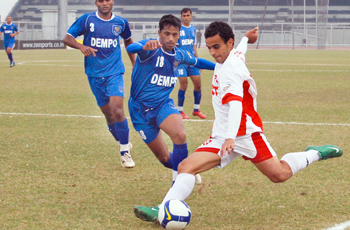
Football Match

Skating

A skating rink is situated in Leisure Valley, Sarabha Nagar.

=== Qila Raipur Sports Festival ===
Qila Raipur Sports Festival, popularly known as Rural Olympics Games, is held annually in Kila Raipur, near Ludhiana. Competitions are held for rural sports, including gatka, bullock cart races, trolley races, kabaddi, loading unloading trucks and acrobatics.

== Places of interest ==
Ludhiana district is home to several religious, historical, cultural and recreational attractions.

=== Religious sites ===
- Gurdwara Manji Sahib, Alamgir
- Gurdwara Gurusar Sahib, Katana Sahib
- Nanaksar Kaleran
- Sri Bhaini Sahib
- Guru Ji Aashram, Dugri
- Charan Kanwal Sahib, Machhiwara

=== Historical sites ===
- Serai Lashkari Khan
- Lodhi Fort, Ludhiana
- Maharaja Ranjit Singh War Museum
- Pre-independence buildings in Khanna

=== Nature and recreation ===
- Nehru Rose Garden, Ludhiana
- Rakh Bagh
- Tiger Safari, Ludhiana
- Hardy's World Amusement Park
- Punjab Agricultural University Museum
- Deer Park, Neelon

=== Towns of tourist interest ===
- Doraha
- Jagraon
- Khanna
- Kila Raipur – famous for the annual Rural Olympics.
- Machhiwara
- Mullanpur Dakha
- Payal
- Sidhwanbet
- Sudhar

=== Photo Gallery ===
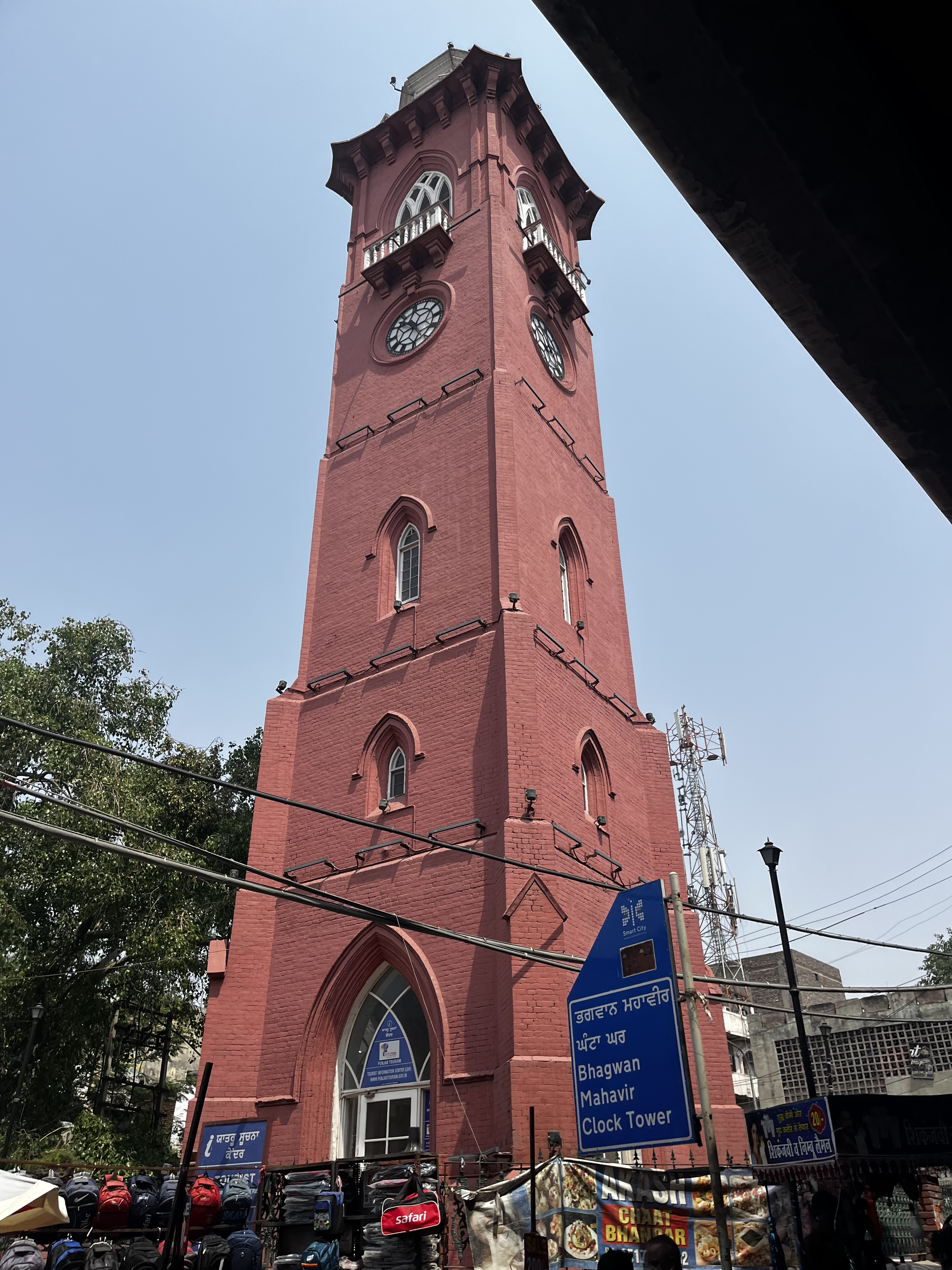
Clock Tower

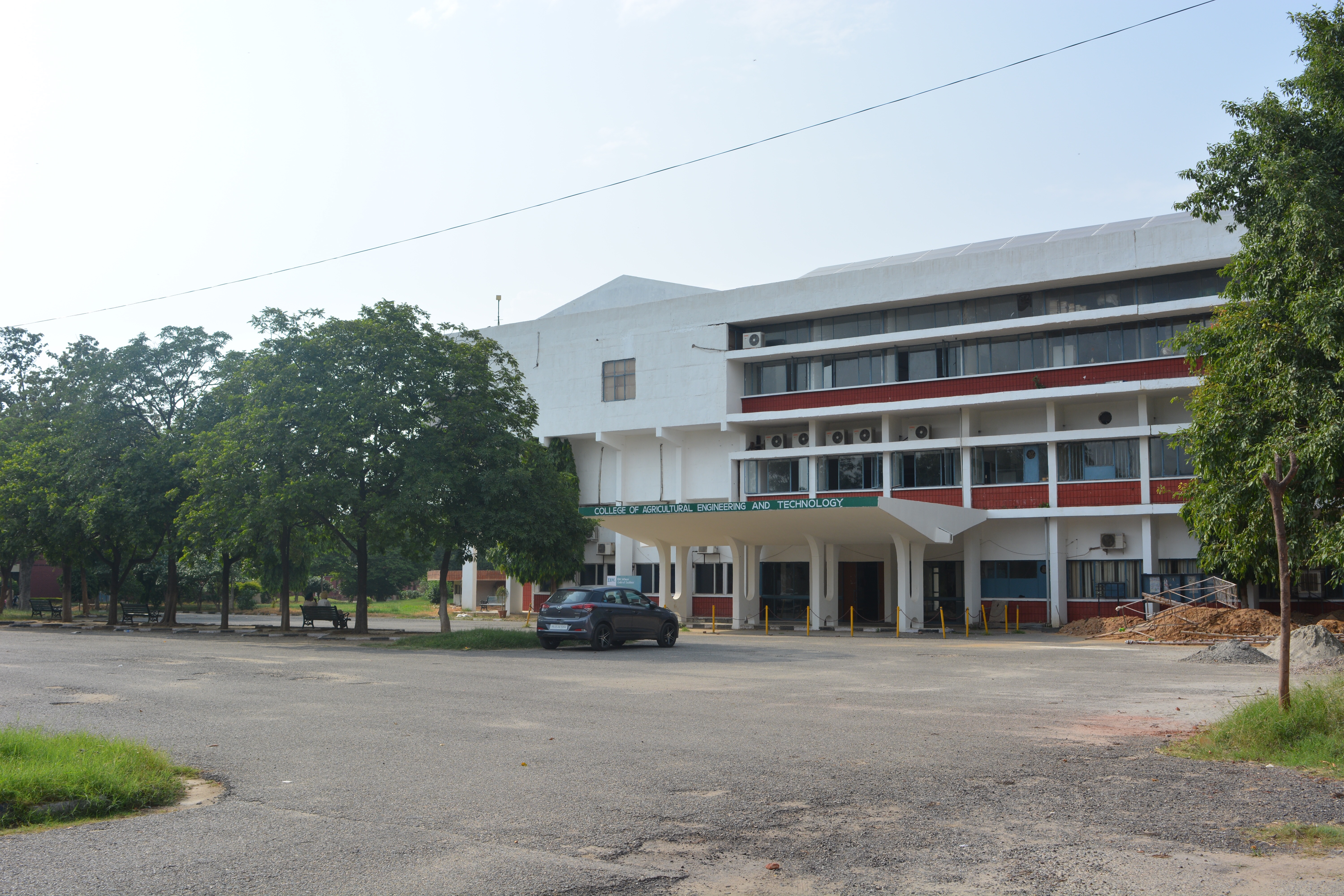
Punjab Agricultural University

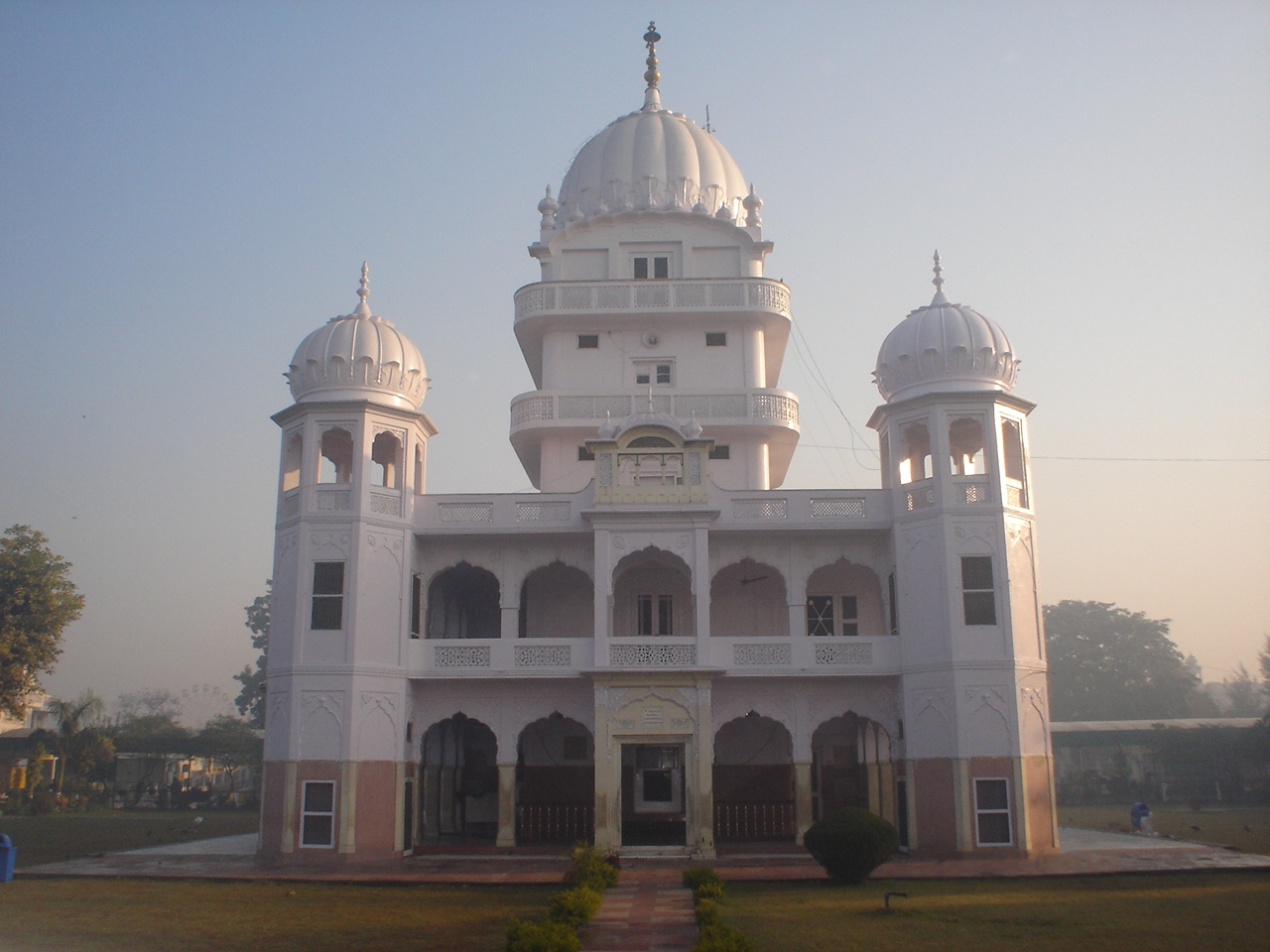
Gurdwara Manji Sahib, Alamgir

Nanaksar Kaleran

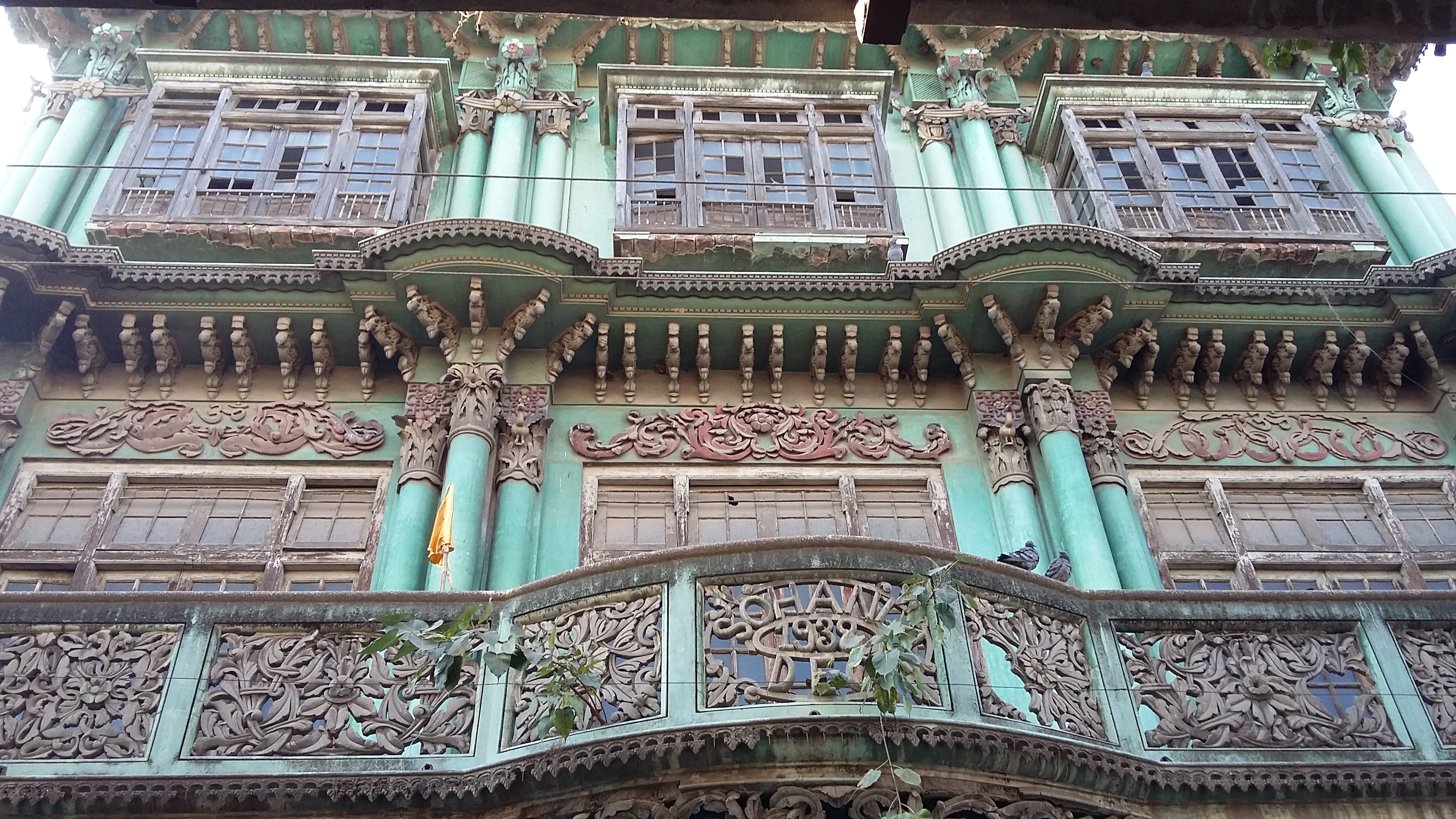
Historic architecture in Khanna

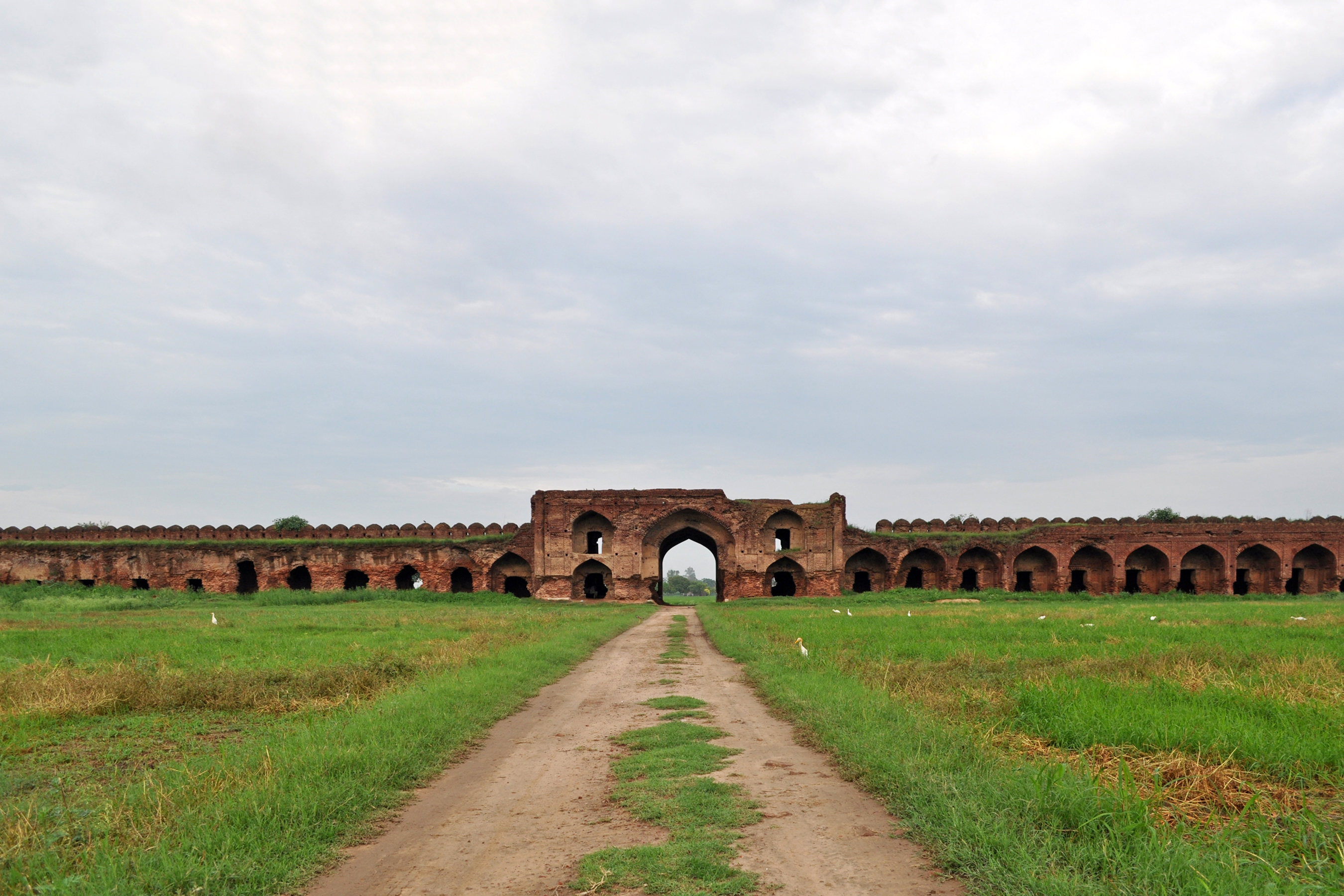
Serai Lashkari Khan

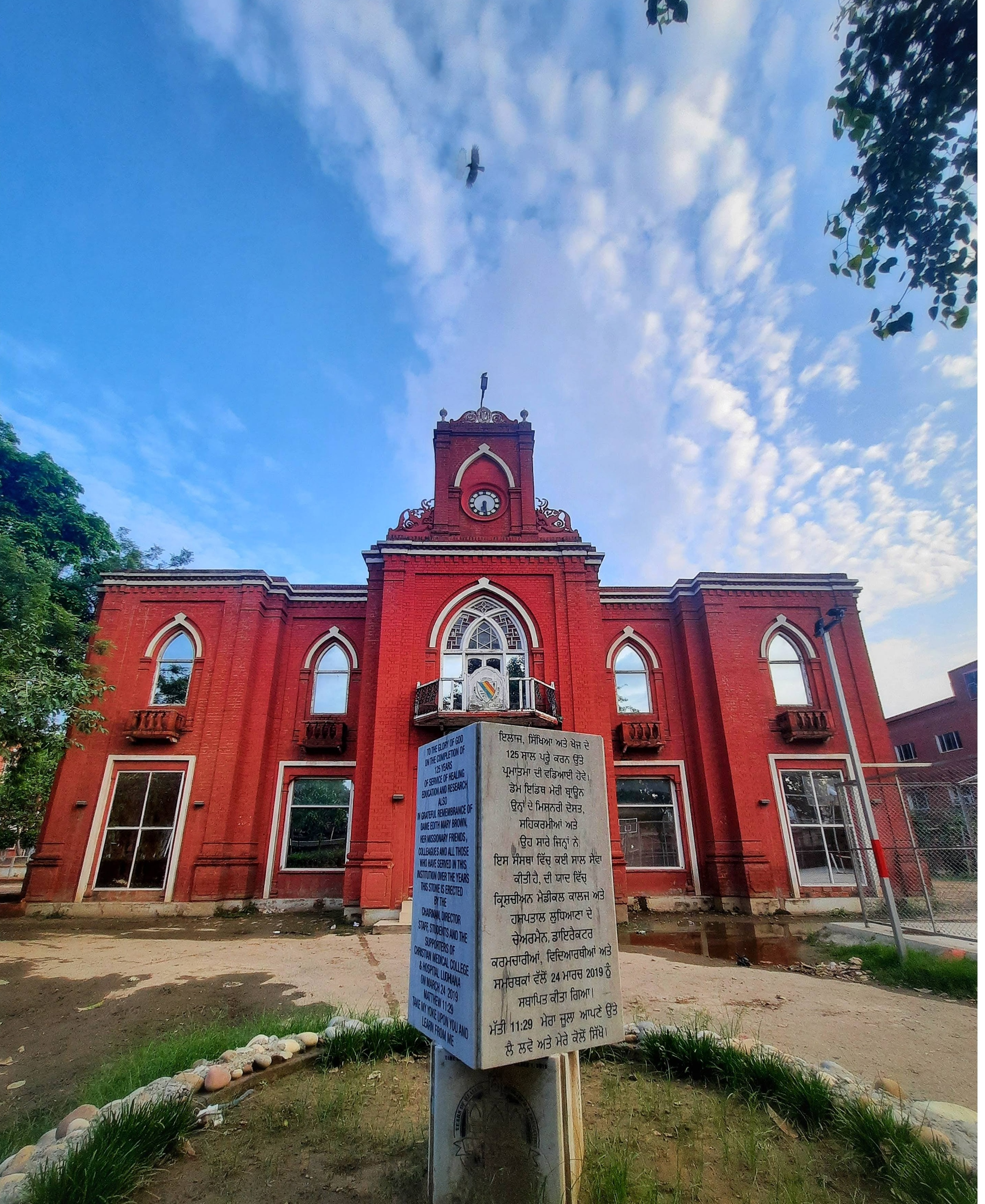
Christian Medical College

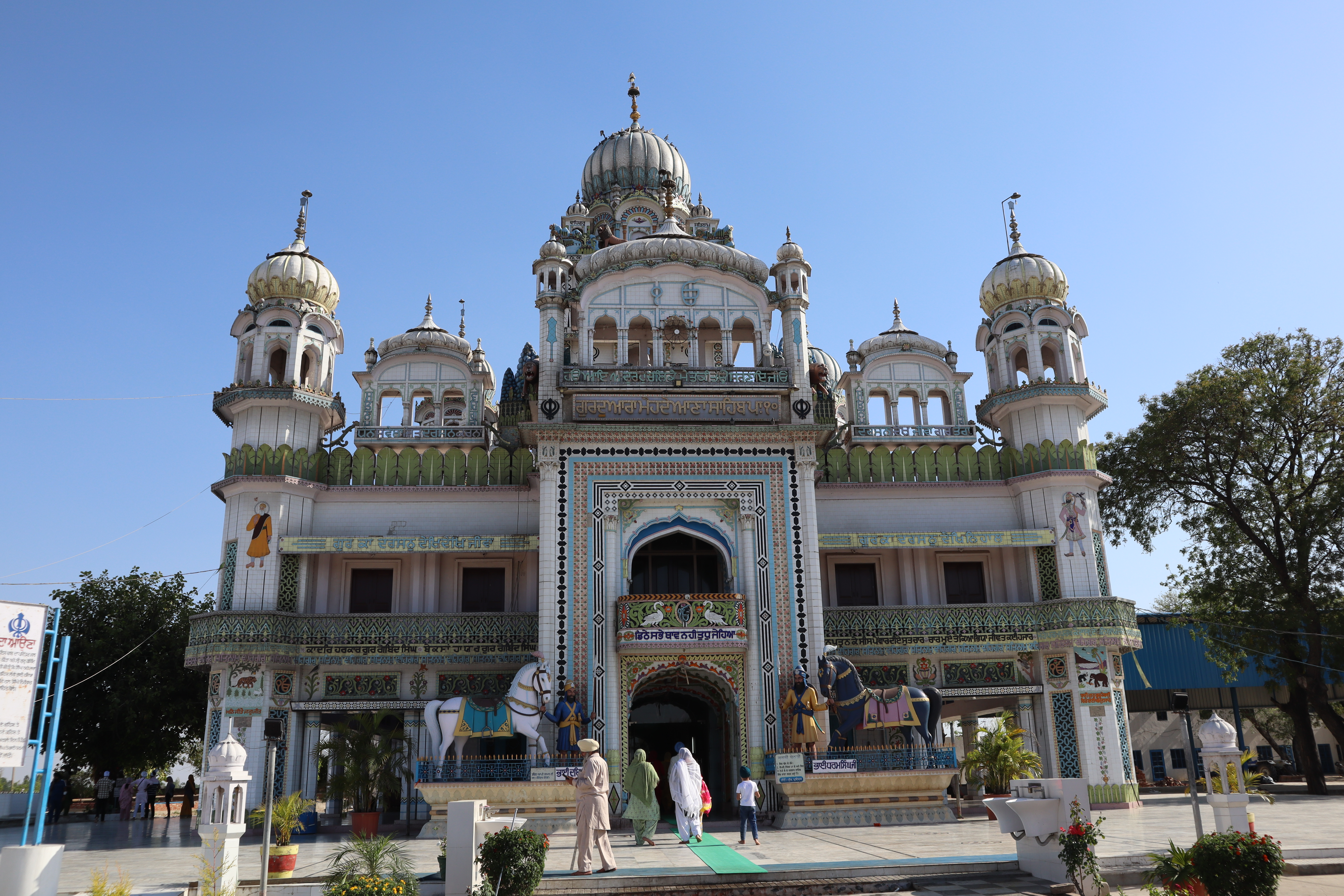
Mehdiana Sahib

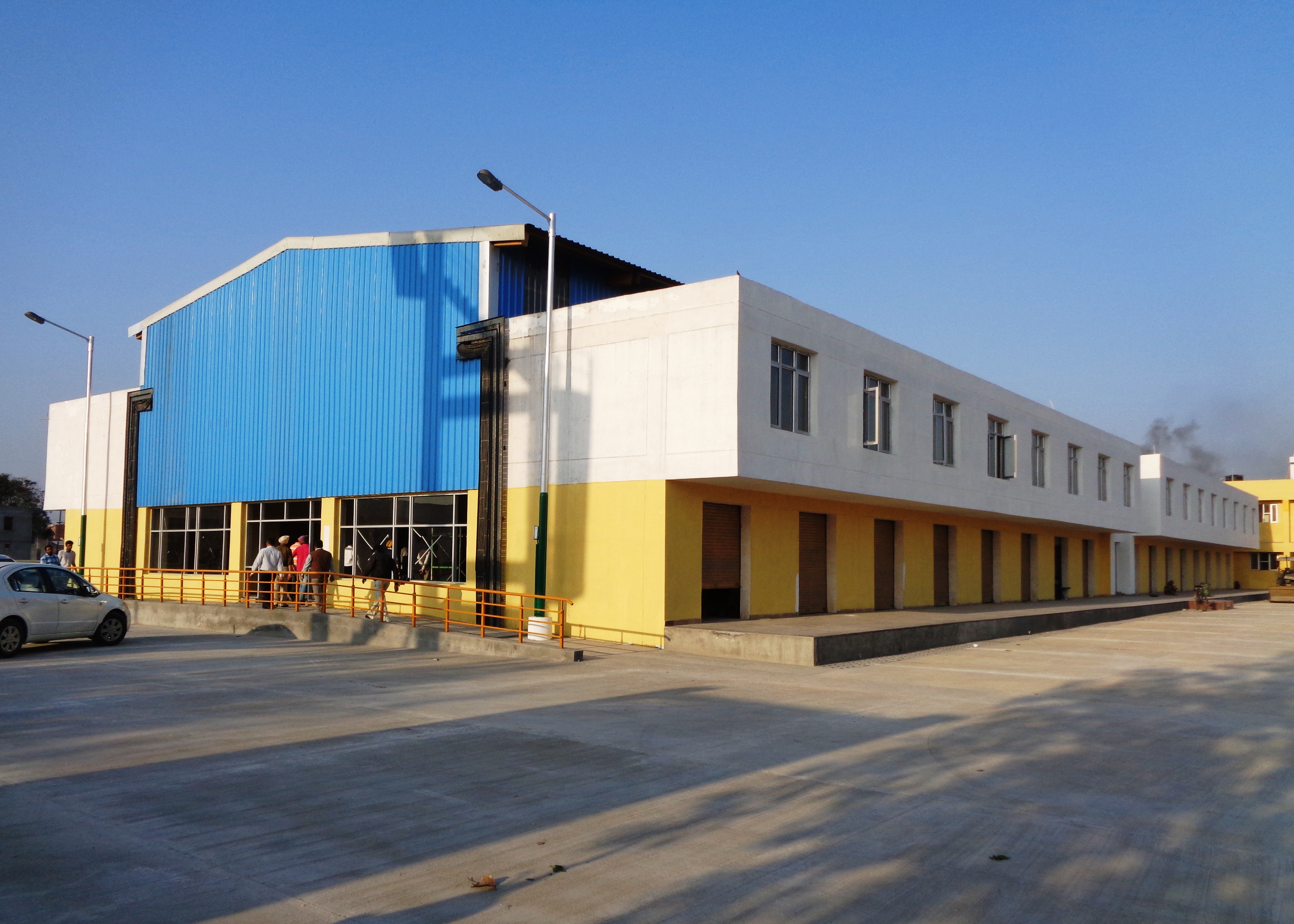
Fish Market

== Transportation ==
Ludhiana is well connected by road and rail as Ludhiana railway station is on the main Delhi-Amritsar route, and is an important railway junction with lines going to Jalandhar, Ferozepur, Dhuri, and Delhi. The city is very well connected with daily or weekly trains to most places in India including the major cities of Jammu, Amritsar, Jalandhar, Patiala, Pathankot, Kanpur, Jaipur, Ajmer, Chandigarh, Ambala, Panipat, Delhi, Pune, Mumbai, Indore, Bhopal, Lucknow, Ahmedabad, Nagpur, Ayodhya, Nanded, Patna, and Kolkata. For administrative reasons the station is under Ferozepur Railway Division. The railway line between Ludhiana and Chandigarh opened in 2013. The government has even passed a dedicated freight track between Ludhiana and Kolkata.

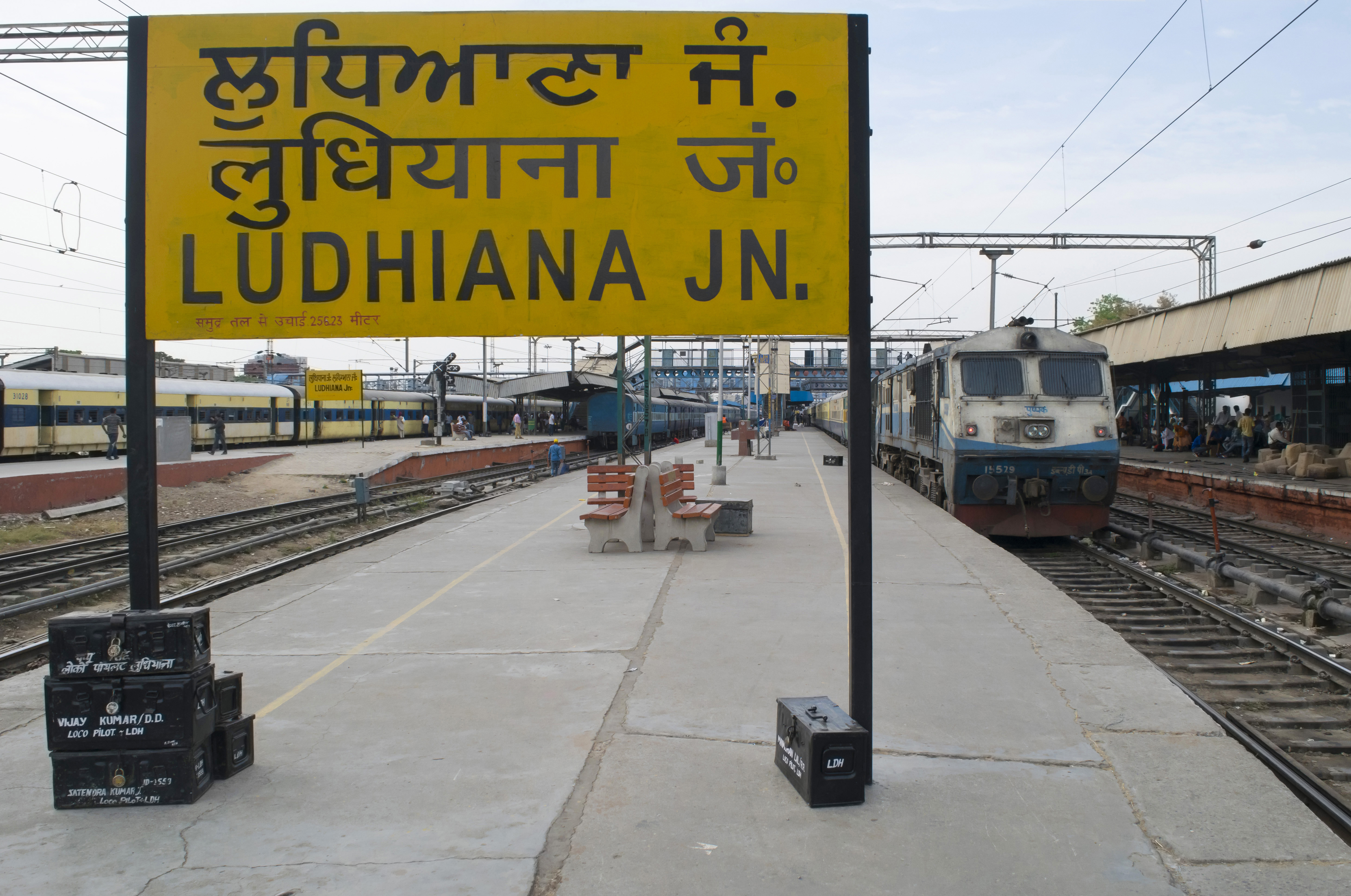
Ludhiana Junction

=== Road ===
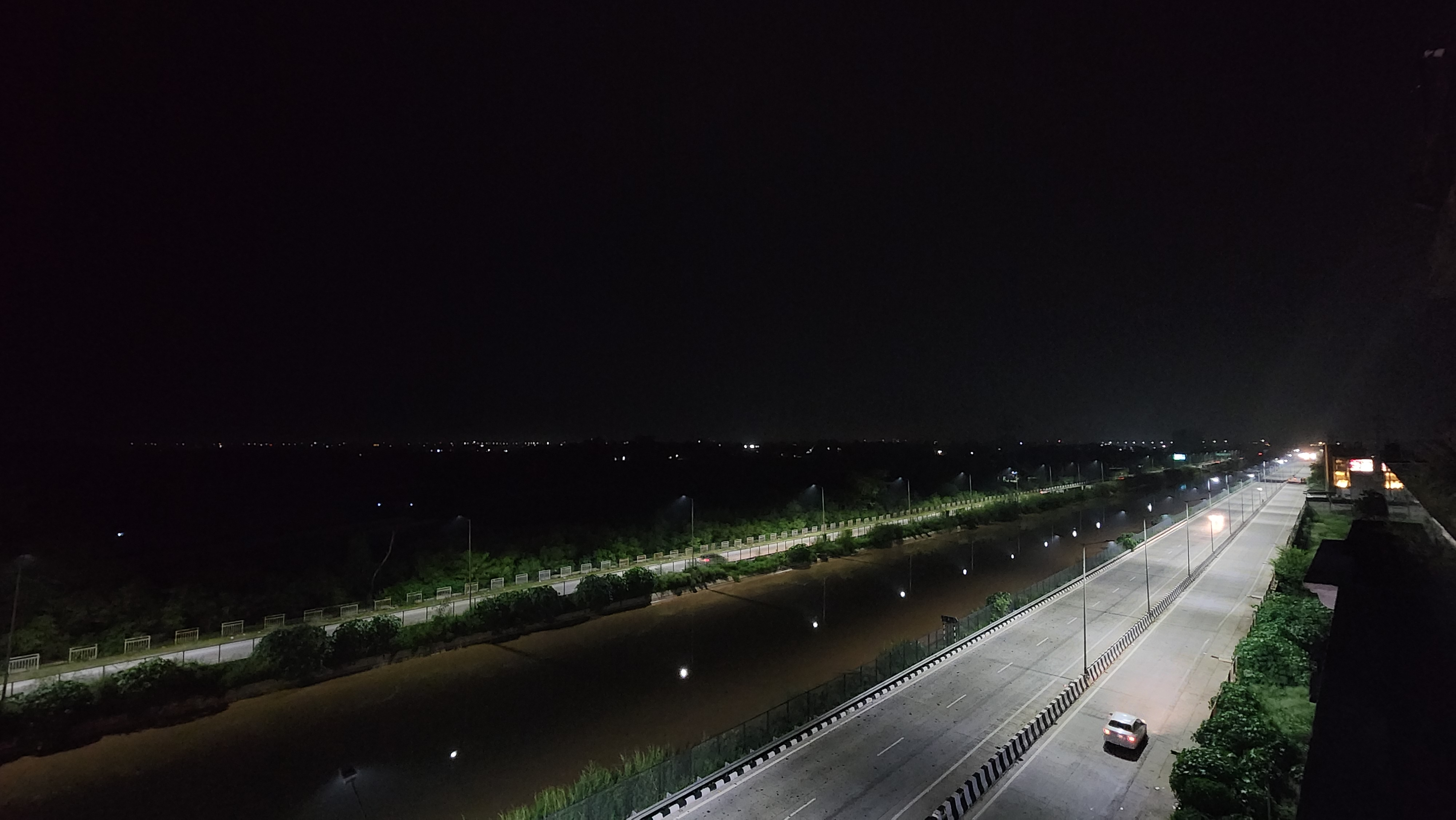
NH 5 passing through South City and Canal road

Ludhiana is connected with other cities of Punjab and also with other states by bus service. Major national highways NH 44, NH 5 (old NH1, NH95 respectively) and state highway SH 11 connect to the city. The transportation services are provided by the state owned Punjab Roadways and private bus operators.

=== Airport ===
Ludhiana is served by two airports, with operations now centred on newer infrastructure. The older Ludhiana Airport, located about 5 km from the city, is a small domestic airport with limited capacity and historically irregular commercial flight operations. To address growing demand, the Halwara International Airport is being developed around 30–40 km from Ludhiana. Inaugurated in February 2026, it is a modern airport capable of handling larger aircraft and is expected to significantly improve regional and national connectivity, with scheduled commercial flights to Delhi commencing from 15 May 2026..

Chandigarh Airport is the nearest international airport to Ludhiana. Other nearby airports are Adampur Airport in Jalandhar and Sri Guru Ram Dass Jee International Airport in Amritsar.

=== Railway ===
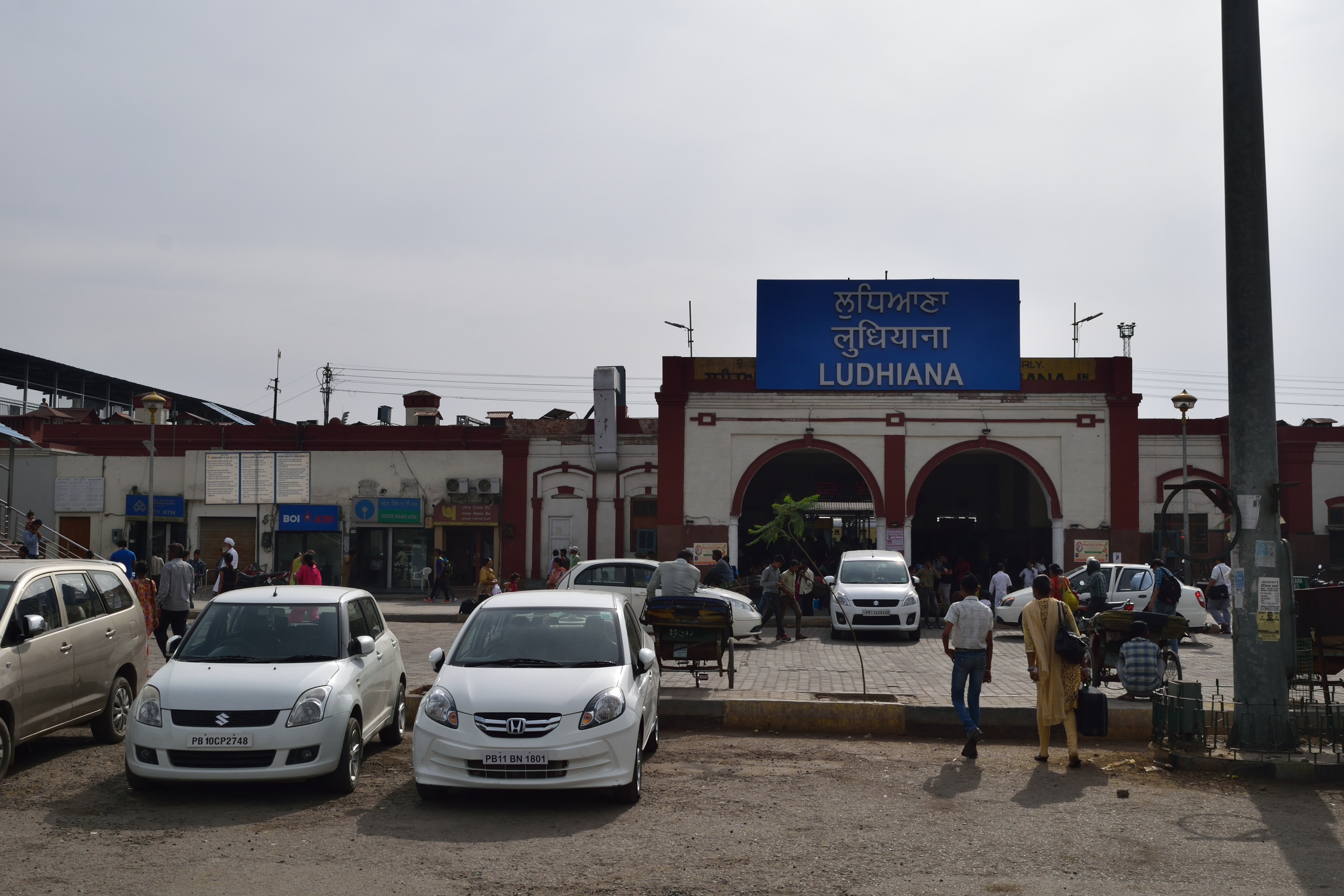
Ludhiana Junction railway station

Ludhiana has strong rail connectivity and is an important junction on the Delhi–Amritsar main line of Indian Railways. The city is primarily served by Ludhiana Junction railway station, one of the busiest railway stations in Punjab, with direct train services to major cities such as Delhi, Amritsar, Mumbai and Kolkata.

Other railway stations within Ludhiana district include Khanna railway station, Doraha railway station, Sahnewal railway station and Phillaur Junction railway station, along with smaller stations such as Dhandari Kalan railway station and Kila Raipur railway station which collectively support both passenger and freight movement across the district.

=== City transportation ===
City bus service has been cancelled. Moving around inside the city is done mostly by auto-rickshaws, and cycle rickshaws, while latest Ludhiana BRTS was planned to be constructed but due to lack of funds allotted and weak planning and management the project too has been scrapped by the government thus worsening the traffic problems in the industrial city.

=== Auto rickshaw ===
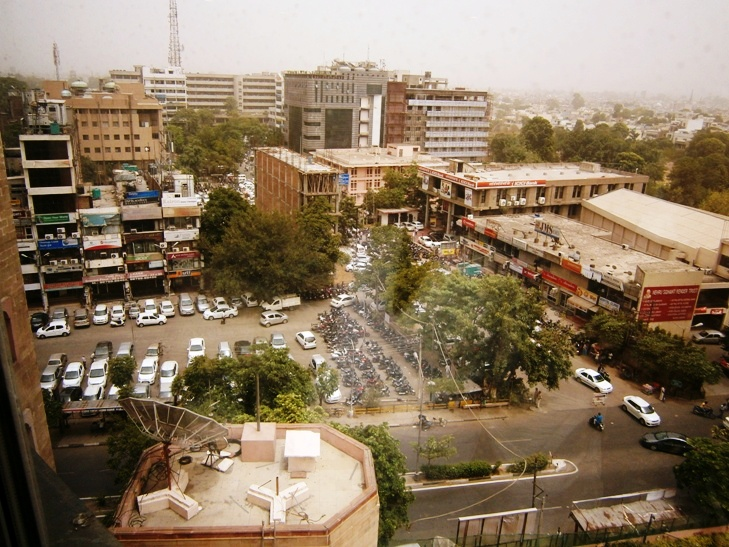
An Air View of Ludhiana

The Auto rickshaw is a three-wheel drive vehicle, which is one way to travel in the city. They have the capacity to hold three to six passengers. It can be hired individually or on a sharing basis. The auto rickshaws are easily available at every major place, including the interstate bus terminal and the railway station at a nominal fare which varies from ₨ 10 to ₨ 30. Jugnoo, an on demand auto rickshaw application launched its operations in February 2015 to provide low cost, reliable, 24×7 service to the citizens of Ludhiana.

=== Rickshaw ===
Cycle rickshaws are widely used in Ludhiana. The rickshaw or tricycle is pulled by a person and is a relatively cheap way of travelling in the city, but has become pricey after the autos have been scrapped.

=== Taxi ===
Radio taxis are also easily available. This is the most used means of transport by the people of Ludhiana. Ola Cabs launched in the city on 7 October 2014. Uber is also very popular in the city. Zoomcar provides cars for self-drive car rental in the city.

== Education ==
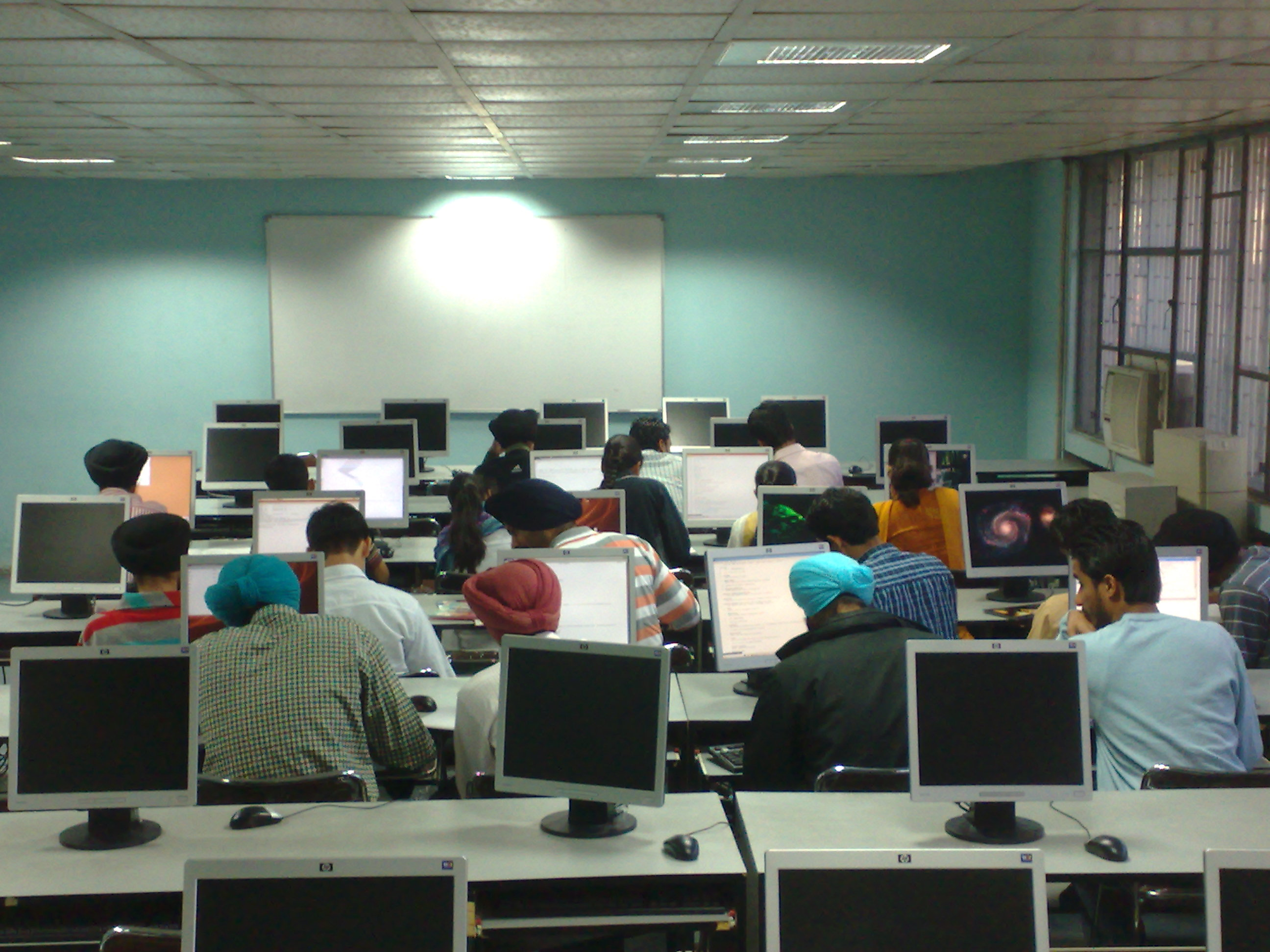
Students working in GNDEC

=== Schools ===
Ludhiana has 363 senior secondary, 367 high, 324 middle, 1129 primary, and pre-primary recognised Schools, with a total of 398,770 students. Most of these schools are either run by the ICSE Central Board of Secondary Education, Central Board of Secondary Education (CBSE) or by Punjab School Education Board. Prominent schools in Ludhiana include Delhi Public School, Sacred Heart Convent School, Sat Paul Mittal, R.S. Model Senior Secondary School and Kundan Vidya Mandir.

=== Agriculture ===
Ludhiana is home to the largest agricultural university in Asia and one of the largest in the world, Punjab Agricultural University. The College of Veterinary Sciences at PAU was recently upgraded to the Guru Angad Dev Veterinary and Animal Sciences University (GADVASU).

GADVASU was established at Ludhiana by an act of the Punjab Legislature No. 16 of 2005 notified in the Punjab Government Gazette on 9 August 2005 and it started functioning 21 April 2006 for promoting livestock production, health and prevention of disease through integrated teaching, research and extension programmes.

=== Medical ===
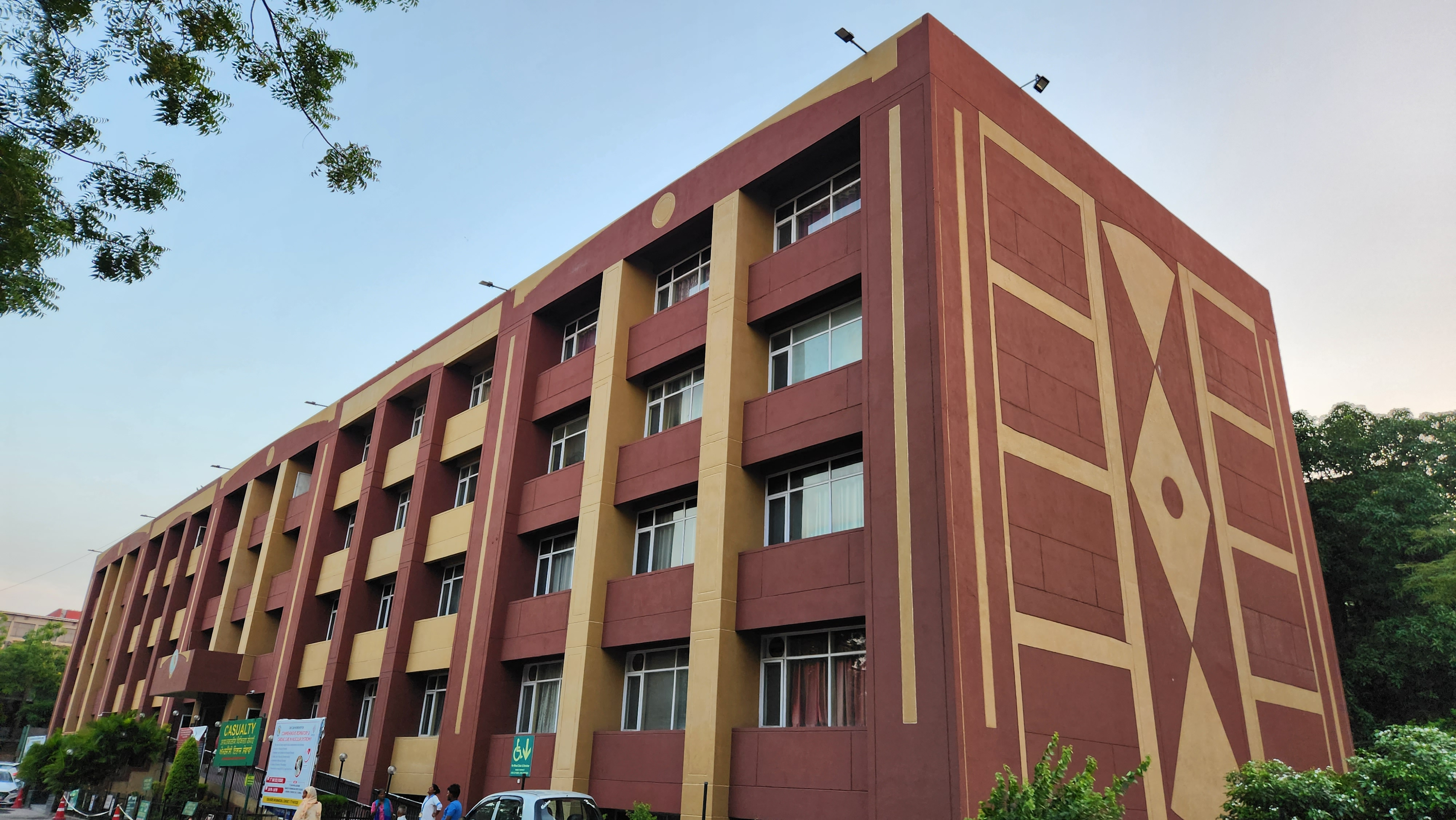
Hospital building of Christian Medical College

Christian Medical College, Ludhiana, the first medical school for women in Asia, was founded by Dame Edith Mary Brown in 1894. Christian Medical College is a major and reputed tertiary care hospital in India, also the location of the world's first face transplant. Dayanand Medical College and Hospital is another tertiary care teaching hospital in Ludhiana. Both these institutions are recognised by the Medical Council of India. The college is affiliated to Baba Farid University of Health Sciences, Punjab.

=== Engineering ===
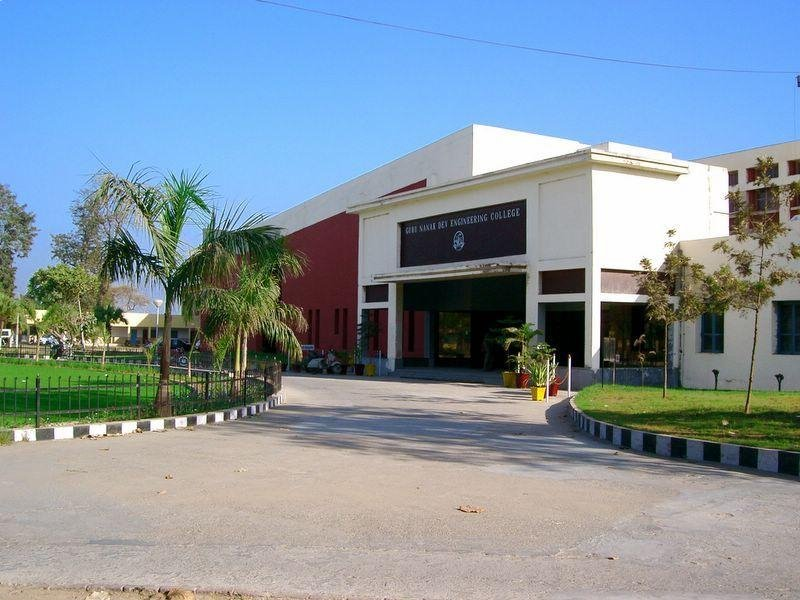
Guru Nanak Dev Engineering College

Guru Nanak Dev Engineering College is an institution offering facilities and education for engineering students. It has a research and development centre for bicycles and sewing machines.

Ludhiana College of Engineering and Technology is an institute for Engineering and Management studies.

== See also ==
- List of notable people from Ludhiana
- Ludhianvi
- Largest Indian Cities by GDP

== Bibliography ==
- Mahan Kosh, Bhai Kahan Singh Nabha, pp 311.
- Encyclopaedia of Sikhism, Prof. Harbans Singh vol 2 pp 416
- The Sikh Ref Book, Dr Harjinder Singh Dilgeer p464 & p196
- "Hazrat Shah Kamal Qadri Kaithaly". shah-kamal.com.
- Pankaj Mishra (1 January 1995). Butter chicken in Ludhiana: travels in small town India. Penguin Books. ISBN 9780140250671.
