= Political families of Punjab, India =

Indian politicians family

The list of members of political families of Punjab, India. Punjab, since the Partition of India, has been held in the grip of few major political families including the Chaudhary and Kaypee Families of Jalandhar, Majithias of Amritsar, Badals of Muktsar, Royal family of Patiala, Manns of Sheikhupura, Kairons of Tarn Taran and family of Sarai Naga.

In Doaba, the region in Punjab comprising Jalandhar, Hoshiarpur, Kapurthala, and Nawanshahr (Shaheed Bhagat Singh Nagar) districts, there is a strong presence of the Ravidassia/Chamar community, which produced several powerful Ravidassia political families such as the Chaudrary and Kaypee families.The Chaudhary family’s political legacy began with Master Gurbanta Singh and continues through multiple generations in Punjab's Dalit politics. Chaudhary family has contested every Punjab assembly election since 1936. Master Gurbanta Singh rose to become a stalwart of Punjab’s Dalit politics, initially aligning with the Ad-Dharm movement alongside Mangu Ram Mugowalia before joining the Unionist Party and later the Indian National Congress. He started his political life by becoming Village Sarpanch and Parliamentary Secretary in the Ministry of Malik Khizar Hayat Tiwana, Premier of British Punjab, and then he served as MLA six times, including being elected unopposed in 1972, and held ministerial posts in agriculture and education. He played a key role in founding Punjab Agricultural University and in the Bhakra Dam project.

The secondary political families are temporary and not traditional they often change with the times. The current ones include the Bajwas of Gurdaspur, Talwandis of Lyallpur, Bittus of Ludhiana and Jakhars of Fazilka who have had a list of less successful politicians. The Bajwas and Bittus have been staunch INC supporters, the Talwandis have always been staunch allies of the SAD and since 2021 they have been supporting the Shiromani Akali Dal (Sanyukt). The Jakhars have never held loyalty to one party and have switched various times from the BJP and INC.

== Primary political families ==
=== Badal Family ===
- Parkash Singh Badal.
- Sukhbir Singh Badal.
- Harsimrat Kaur Badal.
- Gurdas Singh Badal.
- Manpreet Singh Badal.

=== Chabbewal Family ===
- Raj Kumar Chabbewal - Current Member of Parliament
- Ishank Kumar Chabbewal - Current member of the Punjab Legislative Assembly

=== Chaudhary Family ===
- Master Gurbanta Singh, former Agriculture Minister of Punjab. He was Parliamentary Secretary in the Ministry of Malik Khizar Hayat Tiwana, Premier of British Punjab.
- Chaudhary Jagjit Singh, former Cabinet Minister and MLA
- Chaudhary Surinder Singh, former MLA Kartarpur
- Santokh Singh Chaudhary Member of Parliament from Jalandhar and former Cabinet Minister of Punjab
- Vikramjit Singh Chaudhary, MLA Phillaur and former Chief of Punjab Youth Congress.

=== Chaudhary Sunder Singh family ===
- Late Chaudhary Sunder Singh - Former Member of Parliament
- Santosh Chowdhary - Former Member of Parliament
- Chaudhary Ram Lubaya - former Member of Legislative Assembly

=== Kaypee Family ===
- Darshan Singh Kaypee - Former Minister and five times elected M.L.A
- Mohinder Singh Kaypee - Former Minister and Member of Parliament.

=== Khalsa Family ===
- Gopal Singh Khalsa - Elected M.L.A in 1937 for Punjab Provincial Assembly and was appointed as Parliamentary Secretary to the British Punjab's Premier Sikandar Hayat Khan. He was first Leader of the Opposition in the first Punjab Legislative Assembly after Independence of India in 1952. He was very close associate of Dr. Ambedkar.
- Harinder Singh Khalsa - Former Diplomat and former Member of Parliament.

=== Majithia Family ===
- Wing Commander Sardar Surjit Singh Majithia.
- Bikram Singh Majithia.

=== Patiala Family ===
- Mohinder Kaur.
- Bhalindra Singh.
- Amarinder Singh.
- Preneet Kaur.
- Raninder Singh.

=== Kairon Family ===
- Partap Singh Kairon.
- Surinder Singh Kairon.
- Adesh Partap Singh Kairon.

=== Brar Family ===
- Harcharan Singh Brar.
- Gurbinder Kaur Brar.
- Adesh Kanwarjit Singh Brar.
- Karan Kaur Brar.
