= Master Gurbanta Singh =

Indian politician

Member of Legislative Assembly
- Constituency: Kartarpur

Personal details
- Born: 4 August 1904 Dhaliwal, Jalandhar, Punjab, British India
- Died: 5 February 1980 (aged 75) Jalandhar, Punjab, India
- Party: INC
- Spouse: Sampuran Kaur
- Children: 4 sons Chaudhary Jagjit Singh, Balbir Singh, Chaudhary Santokh Singh, Ravinder Singh
- As of 24 May, 2020

Master Gurbanta Singh (4 August 1904 – 5 February 1980) was an Indian politician, educationist and social reformer from Punjab, India.

He was a former member of the Unionist Party and then Indian National Congress. Master Gurbanta Singh was one of the tallest Dalit leaders of Punjab.

== Early life ==
Master Gurbanta Singh was born in Dhaliwal village, Jullundur, Punjab, in British India. He completed his education at Jalandhar and became a school teacher at Sain Dass A.S Senior Secondary School (Jalandhar).

His political career started, when he became village sarpanch. After the influence of the Ad Dharm movement, he declared himself Ad Dharmi Sikh in the 1931 census along with other As Dharmis of Punjab, especially in Doaba.

== Ad-Dharm Movement ==
In the mid-1920s, Gurbanta Singh came into contact with Mangu Ram Mugowalia, a fellow caste man and also a founder member of the Ghadar Party. Mangu Ram had started the Ad-Dharmi movement and established many mandals in the Doaba region of Punjab, where Dalits formed a major share of the population. Although in the initial years, Singh's closeness to the movement was because of oppression and illiteracy among Dalits of Punjab, later, he fully got involved in this social movement and became General Secretary of Ad-Dharm Mandal of Jalandhar. Both Mangu Ram and Gurbanta Singh took the Ad-Dharm movement to its zenith, and it became the most successful Dalit reform movement in North India. At the same time, he joined Unionist Party and fought the election unsuccessfully.

After years of long contributions to the movement but due to differences with Seth Kishan Dass, another prominent leader of the Ad-Dharm movement, he left the Mandal and became active in politics.

== Politics ==
Master Gurbanta Singh again fought elections from Jullundur (Reserved Seat) and became successful. He was made Parliamentary Secretary in the Ministry of Malik Khizar Hayat Tiwana (Premier of Punjab).

In 1947, India gained independence, and he joined Indian National Congress. He fought elections in 1952 and 1957 also but lost elections. In 1962, he won from the Kartarpur constituency and was chosen as a Minister in the Cabinet of Chief Minister Pratap Singh Kairon from 1956 to 1964.

He became Agriculture Minister of Punjab and played an instrumental role in establishing Punjab Agricultural University (Ludhiana), which paved the way for the Green Revolution in India and was a key player in the construction of the Bhakra Dam.

In the 1972 Punjab Assembly Elections, Gurbanta Singh was elected unopposed and joined the Ministry of Giani Zail Singh (former Chief Minister of Punjab). He became a Member of the Punjab Legislative Assembly six times and slowly became known as the biggest Dalit leader of Punjab. In those times, even the Republican Party of India, founded by Dr B R Ambedkar himself became small in front of his stature.

== Gurbanta's political clan ==
Master Gurbanta's family is known to be one of Punjab's most prominent political families. His elder son, Chaudhary Jagjit Singh, became his successor who became a Zila Parishad member of Jalandhar and later became a five-time MLA from Kartarpur constituency and then a Minister in the cabinets of Beant Singh, Rajinder Kaur Bhattal and Amarinder Singh. His son Chaudhary Surinder Singh also became an MLA and a Zila Parshad member.

Gurbanta's youngest son, Santokh Singh Chaudhary, became his real political successor even without his declaration and became MLA of Phillaur and then Member of Parliament from Jalandhar. He was also made Chief Parliamentary Secretary, Vice-President of Punjab Congress, four times Cabinet Minister in Punjab govt., and a member of Central Board of Film Certification.

Chaudhary Santokh's wife, Karamjit Kaur Chaudhary, retired as Director of Public Instruction (Colleges) in the Government of Punjab and was earlier a principal of Govt. Sports and Arts College (Jalandhar). Their son Vikramjit Singh Chaudhary is currently MLA of Phillaur and has served as the President of Punjab Youth Congress and General Secretary of PPCC.

== Legacy ==
Master Gurbanta Singh Memorial Janta College at Kartarpur, Punjab (India) was established by him and was later renamed after him. Master Gurbanta Singh Marg at Basti Bawa Khel in Jalandhar is named after him.

Master Gurbanta Singh is known as a Dalit stalwart in Punjab politics.

== See also ==
- Ad-Dharm movement
- Kartarpur Assembly Constituency
- Political families of Punjab
