= Jalandhar Cantonment Assembly constituency =

Legislative Assembly constituency in Punjab State, India

Coordinates: 31.27°N 75.57°E

Jalandhar Cantt.
- Constituency No. 37 for the Punjab Legislative Assembly

Constituency details
- Country: India
- State: Punjab
- District: Jalandhar
- Lok Sabha constituency: Jalandhar
- Total electors: 193,666 (in 2022)
- Reservation: None

Member of Legislative Assembly
- 16th Punjab Legislative Assembly
- Incumbent Pargat Singh
- Party: Indian National Congress
- Elected year: 2022

Jalandhar Cantt Assembly constituency (Sl. No.: 37) is a Punjab Legislative Assembly constituency in Jalandhar district, Punjab state, India. This constituency was once represented by Beant Singh, a former Chief Minister. The current representative is Pargat Singh.

== Members of the Legislative Assembly ==
Most successful parties from Jalandhar Cantonment Vidhan Sabha
1. INC (9 Times) (64.3%)
2. SAD (2 Times) (14.3%)
3. IND (1 Time) (7.14%)
4. JP (1 Time) (7.14%)
5. INC (I) (1 Time) (7.14%)

Year	Member	Party
Jullundur Cantonment constituency
1962	Karam Singh Kirti	Indian National Congress
1967	R. Singh	Independent
1969	Saroop Singh	Indian National Congress
1972	Balbir Singh	Indian National Congress
1977	Harbhajan Singh	Janata Party
1980	Ram Lal Chetti	Indian National Congress (Indira)
1985	Indira	Indian National Congress
1992	Beant Singh	Indian National Congress
1997	Tej Parkash Singh	Indian National Congress
2002	Gurkanwal Kaur	Indian National Congress
2007	Jagbir Singh Brar	Shiromani Akali Dal
Jalandhar Cantonment constituency
2012	Pargat Singh	Shiromani Akali Dal
2017	Pargat Singh	Indian National Congress
2022	Pargat Singh	Indian National Congress

== Election results ==
=== 2027 ===
Punjab Assembly election, 2027: Jalandhar Cantonment
Party	Candidate	Votes	%	±%
AAP	Deepak Bali			
AD (WPD)				New entry
INC				
BSP				
SAD				
BJP				
NOTA	None of the above			
Majority				
Turnout				

=== 2022 ===
Punjab Assembly election, 2022: Jalandhar Cantonment
Party	Candidate	Votes	%	±%
INC	Pargat Singh	40,816	32.63	▼14.17
AAP	Surinder Singh Sodhi	35,008	27.99	▲7.59
SAD	Jagbir Singh Brar	27,387	21.89	▼1.91
BJP	Sarabjit Singh Makkar	15,946	12.75	New entry
Independent	Jaswinder Singh Sangha	1,890	1.51	
SAD(A)	Gurmukh Singh	1,769	1.41	
NOTA	None of the above	935	0.75	
Majority		5,808	4.60	
Turnout		125,090	64.5	
Registered electors		193,666		

=== 2017 ===
Punjab Assembly election, 2017: Jalandhar Cantonment
Party	Candidate	Votes	%	±%
INC	Pargat Singh	59,349	46.8	▲10.7
SAD	Sarabjit Singh Makkar	30,225	23.8	▼18.2
AAP	Harkrishan Singh Walia	25,912	20.4	New entry
BSP	Amrik Chand	7,989	6.3	▼6.1
NOTA	None of the Above	1,445	0.8	
Margin of victory		29,124	23.2	▲17.3
Turnout		125,366	68.7	▼2.1
Registered electors		184,478		
Swing to INC from SAD		Swing		

=== 2012 ===
Punjab Assembly election, 2012: Jalandhar Cantonment
Party	Candidate	Votes	%	±%
SAD	Pargat Singh	48,290	42.0	
INC	Jagbir Singh Brar	41,492	36.1	
BSP	Hardev Kaur Shant	14,278	12.4	
Margin of victory		6,798	5.9	
Turnout		114,726	70.8	
Registered electors		162,146		
Swing to SAD from INC		Swing		
