= Swarn =

Swarn is both a given name and surname. Notable people with the name include:

- Swarn Noora, Punjabi singer
- Swarn Singh Kalsi, Indian engineer
- George Swarn (born 1964), American football player

== See also ==
- Swan (surname)
