= Punjab Assembly Committee on Government Assurances =

Indian Legislative committee

Committee on Government Assurances
Committee of the House
- 16th Punjab Assembly
- State: Punjab

Leadership
- Chaiperson: Kunwar Vijay Pratap Singh
- Chairperson party: Aam Aadmi Party
- Appointer: Punjab Assembly speaker

Structure
- Seats: 13
- Political Parties: AAP (10); INC (2); SAD (1)
- Election criteria: The members are elected every year from amongst its members of house according to the principle of proportional representation.
- Tenure: 1 Year

Jurisdiction
- Purpose: Legislative oversight of the Government Assurances

Rules & Procedure
- Applicable rules: Article 208 of the Constitution of India section 32 of the States Reorganisation Act, 1956; Rules 232(1) and 2(b) of Rules of Procedure and Conduct of Business in Punjab Legislative Assembly

Punjab Assembly Committee on Government Assurances of Punjab Legislative Assembly is constituted annually for a one-year period from among the members of the Assembly. This Committee consists of thirteen members.

== Functions ==
The functions of the committee are explained below.

During the session of assembly, while answering the Questions, supplementary Questions, Calling attention notices, discussions on budgets, Resolutions and other discussions, Government makes promises and gives assurance of many kinds. There is Committee to get implemented the promises and assurance given by the Govt., Namely, Government Assurance Committee. The Committee is nominated by the Hon'ble Speaker Under Rule 238 of the Rules of Procedure and Conduct of Business in Punjab Vidhan Sabha.

== Appointment ==
The speaker appoints the committee and its members every year for a one-year term according to the powers conferred by Article 208 of the Constitution of India read with section 32 of the States Reorganisation Act, 1956 (37 of 1956), and in pursuance of Rules 232(1) and 2(b) of the Rules of Procedure and Conduct of Business in the Punjab Legislative Assembly.

== Members ==
For the one-year period starting May 2022, the Committee on Government Assurances of 16th Punjab Assembly had following members:

Committee on Government Assurances (2022–23)
Sr. No.	Name	Post	Party
1	Kunwar Vijay Pratap Singh	Chairperson	AAP
2	Balkar Singh	Member	AAP
3	Balkar Singh Sidhu	Member	AAP
4	Balwinder Singh Dhaliwal	Member	INC
5	Harmit Singh Pathanmajra	Member	AAP
6	Jiwan Singh Sangowal	Member	AAP
7	Lakhbir Singh Rai	Member	AAP
8	Madan Lal Bagga	Member	AAP
9	Manpreet Singh Ayali	Member	SAD
10	Neena Mittal	Member	AAP
11	Sheetal Angural	Member	AAP
12	Sukhveer Singh Maiserkhana	Member	AAP
13	Tripat Rajinder Singh Bajwa	Member	INC

== Chairpersons ==
Tenure	Terms	Name	Political party
2021-22	1	Inderbir Singh Bolaria	Indian National Congress
2022-23	1	Kunwar Vijay Pratap Singh	Aam Aadmi Party

== Previous members ==
For the one-year period in previous years, the Committee on Government Assurances of 15th Punjab Assembly had following members:

=== 2020–21 ===
Committee on Government Assurances (2020–21)
Sr. No.	Name	Post	Party
1	Inderbir Singh Bolaria	Chairperson	INC
2	Arun Dogra	Member	INC
3	Baldev Singh Khaira	Member	SAD
4	Baljinder Kaur	Member	AAP
5	Balwinder Singh Bains	Member	INC
6	Dalvir Singh Goldy	Member	INC
7	Harinder Pal Singh Chandumajra	Member	INC
8	Harminder Singh Gill	Member	INC
9	Kanwarjit Singh	Member	SAD
10	Rajinder Beri	Member	INC
11	Pawan Kumar Adia	Member	INC
12	Sukhjit Singh	Member	INC
13	Sukhwinder Singh Danny Bandala	Member	INC
14	Choudhary Surinder Singh	Member	INC

=== 2019–20 ===
Committee on Government Assurances (2019–20)
Sr. No.	Name	Post	Party
1	Parminder Singh Pinki	Chairperson	INC
2	Baldev Singh Khaira	Member	SAD
3	Brindermeet Singh Pahra	Member	INC
4	Darshan Singh Brar	Member	INC
5	Gurmeet Singh Haher	Member	INC
6	Gurpreet Singh Kangar	Member	INC
7	Harminder Singh Gill	Member	INC
8	Kanwarjit Singh	Member	SAD
9	Kulbir Singh Zira	Member	INC
10	Nirmal Singh	Member	INC
11	Pritam Singh Kotbhai	Member	INC
12	Sharanjit Singh Dhillon	Member	INC
13	Simarnjit Singh Bains	Member	INC

=== 2018–19 ===
Committee on Government Assurances (2018–19)
Sr. No.	Name	Post	Party
1	Parminder Singh Pinki	Chairperson	INC
2	Balvinder Singh Bains	Member	INC
3	Budh Ram	Member	INC
4	Fatehjang Singh Bajwa	Member	INC
5	Gurpreet Singh Kangar	Member	INC
6	Kanwarjit Singh	Member	SAD
7	Kuljit Singh Nagra	Member	INC
8	Lakhvir Singh Lakha	Member	INC
9	Navtej Singh Cheema	Member	INC
10	Nazar Singh Manshahia	Member	INC
11	Ramanjeet Singh Sikki	Member	INC
12	Sharanjit Singh Dhillon	Member	INC
13	Sukhpal Singh Bhullar	Member	INC

=== 2017–18 ===
Committee on Government Assurances (2017–18)
Sr. No.	Name	Post	Party
1	Randeep Singh	Chairperson	INC
2	Amit Vij	Member	INC
3	Amrik Singh Dhillon	Member	INC
4	Arun Narang	Member	BJP
5	Barindermeet Singh Pahra	Member	INC
6	Harpal Singh Cheema	Member	INC
7	Inderbir Singh Bolaria	Member	INC
8	Kulbir Singh	Member	INC
9	Kuljit Singh Nagra	Member	INC
10	N. K. Sharma	Member	INC
11	Rupinder Kaur Rubi	Member	INC
12	Sukhwinder Kumar	Member	INC
13	Sunder Sham Arora	Member	INC
