= Lakhbir Singh Rai =

Indian politician

MLA, Punjab Legislative Assembly
- Incumbent
- Assumed office 2022
- Constituency: Fatehgarh Sahib
- Majority: Aam Aadmi Party

Personal details
- Party: Aam Aadmi Party

Lakhbir Singh Rai is an Indian politician and the MLA representing the Fatehgarh Sahib Assembly constituency in the Punjab Legislative Assembly. He is a member of the Aam Aadmi Party. He was elected as the MLA in the 2022 Punjab Legislative Assembly election.

== Member of Legislative Assembly ==
He represents the Fatehgarh Sahib Assembly constituency as MLA in Punjab Assembly. The Aam Aadmi Party gained a strong 79% majority in the sixteenth Punjab Legislative Assembly by winning 92 out of 117 seats in the 2022 Punjab Legislative Assembly election. MP Bhagwant Mann was sworn in as Chief Minister on 16 March 2022.

Committee assignments of Punjab Legislative Assembly

- Member (2022–23) Committee on Government Assurances
- Member (2022–23) Committee on Subordinate Legislation

== Electoral performance ==
Punjab Assembly election, 2022: Fatehgarh Sahib
Party	Candidate	Votes	%	±%
AAP	Lakhbir Singh Rai	57,706	45.98	
INC	Kuljit Singh Nagra	25,507	20.32	
BJP	Didar Singh Bhatti	14,186	11.3	New entry
SAD(A)	Emaan Singh Mann	12,286	9.79	
SAD	Jagdeep Singh Cheema	10,922	8.7	
SSP	Sarbjeet Singh	2,159	1.72	
NOTA	None of the above	765		
Majority		32,199	25.66	
Turnout				
Registered electors		161,754		
AAP gain from INC				

State Legislative Assembly
Preceded by -	Member of the Punjab Legislative Assembly from Fatehgarh Sahib Assembly constituency 2022 –	Incumbent
