= Gurkirat Singh Kotli =

Indian politician

Gurkirat Singh Kotli (born 15 October 1973) is an Indian politician and was Cabinet Minister of Industries & Commerce, Information Technology, Science & Technology in the Punjab Government inducted in the cabinet in 2021 September.

== Political career ==
Elected to the Punjab Vidhan Sabha in 2012 from Khanna and again in 2017. Kotli is the Grandson of former Punjab Chief Minister, late Beant Singh, started his political career in 1992 as a Youth Congress leader. An arts graduate from Government College, Sector-11, Chandigarh, Kotli was tipped to contest polls for chief of Punjab Youth Congress in 2008, but couldn’t because of being overage by merely 2 or 3 months, which were eventually contested and won by his cousin (father’s brother’s son) Ravneet Singh Bittu, who is now Lok Sabha MP from Ludhiana.

== Family ==
He comes from the third generation of the Beant Singh family which has been active in Punjab politics since 1969 when Beant Singh won as an Independent from Payal of Ludhiana and became MLA for the first time. Gurkirat’s father, Tej Parkash, was three-time MLA and former Cabinet minister. Last he was the transport minister in Captain Amarinder-led Punjab government from 2002-2007. Although his family’s ancestral village is Kotla Afghana in Payal constituency of Ludhiana from where Tej Parkash has been two-time MLA, Gurkirat contested his first Vidhan Sabha poll from Khanna constituency of Ludhiana after Payal was notified as ‘reserved’ constituency. He again won from Khanna in 2017.

== Controversy ==
The 31 August 1994 abduction, molestation and illegal confinement case of French national Katia Darnand has come to haunt Gurkirat Kotli time and again in which the victim had named him as one of the main accused. Even as the court had acquitted all seven accused in 1999, including five of Gurkirat’s friends and two Punjab Police cops, Katia had returned to France alleging that she was getting threats because she had identified the main accused. She never returned to testify against culprits, eventually leading to their acquittal in 1999. The incident had allegedly happened in Mohali. The victim had alleged that she feared for her safety as Gurkirat was the grandson of then CM Beant Singh and the case was not properly pursued allegedly due to the political pressure.

The case shot back to limelight in 2017 after the Shiromani Akali Dal (SAD) moved National Commission for Women (NCW) demanding re-investigation and retrial in the case and eventually a notice was issued to the government of Punjab and a reply was sought.
