= Vikramjit Singh Chaudhary =

Member of Punjab Legislative Assembly

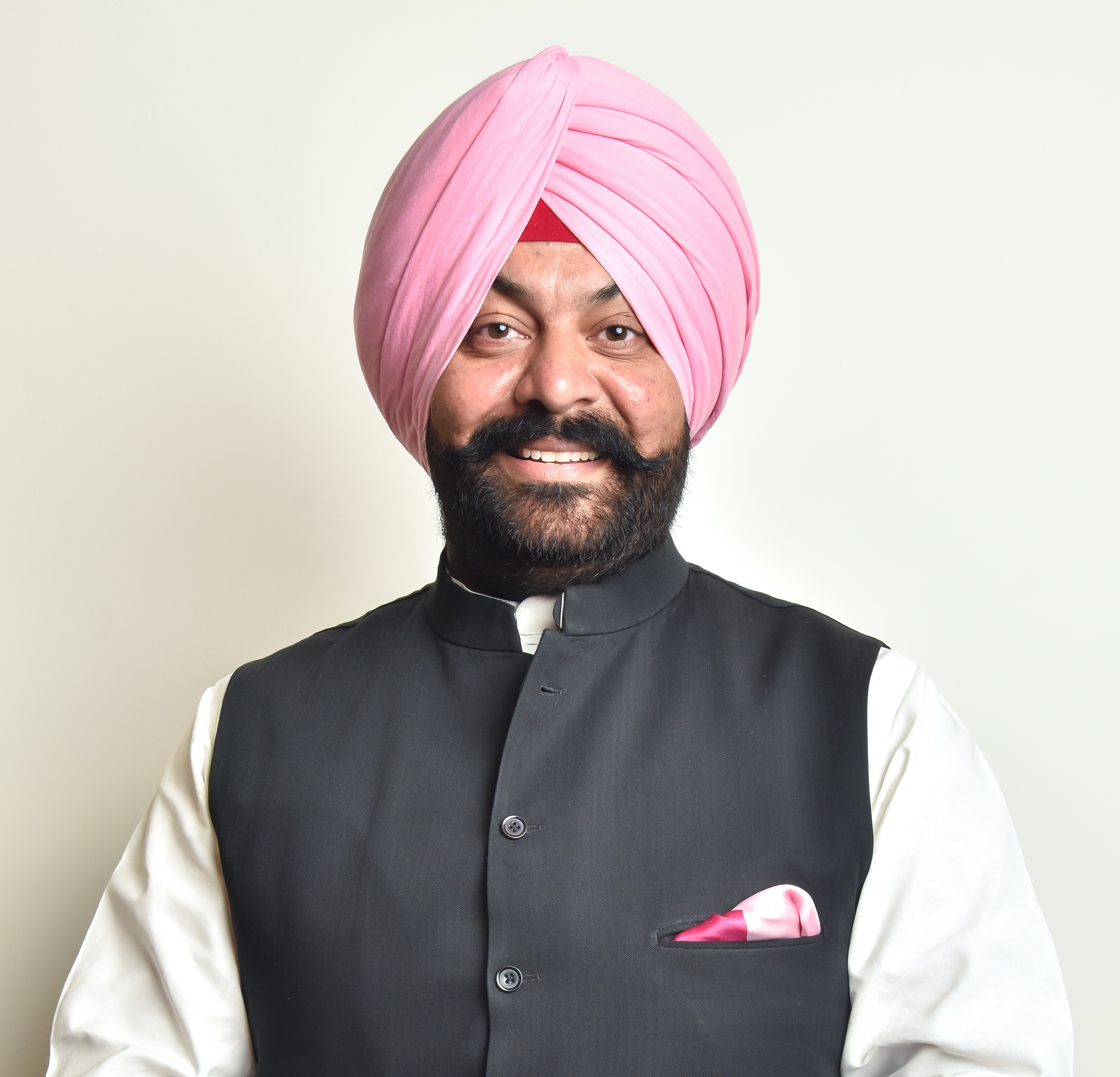
- Constituency: Phillaur Assembly Constituency

Member of the Punjab Legislative Assembly
- Incumbent
- Assumed office 2022

Personal details
- Party: Indian National Congress
- Occupation: Politician

Vikramjit Singh Chaudhary is an Indian politician representing the Phillaur Assembly constituency in the Punjab Legislative Assembly. He was a member of the Indian National Congress until he was suspended in 2024 and re-inducted into the party in June 2025.

== Personal life ==
Vikramjit Singh Chaudhary was born in Ravidassia Family in Jalandhar and is the son of Jalandhar Member of Parliament Santokh Singh Chaudhary and former Director of Public Instruction (Colleges) Karamjit Kaur Chaudhary, grandson of former Agriculture Minister of Punjab Master Gurbanta Singh, nephew of former Local Government Minister Chaudhary Jagjit Singh and cousin of former Member of Punjab Legislative Assembly Chaudhary Surinder Singh. He studied in Bishop Cotton School, Shimla and Government College, Jalandhar. He is married to Shveta Raj Chaudhary and has two daughters.

== Political career ==
The Chaudhary family has contested every assembly election of Punjab since 1936. Vikramjit Singh Chaudhary started his political career with his election as the President of District Youth Congress, Jalandhar (Rural) in 2008. He was elected president of the Punjab Pradesh Youth Congress in December 2011. In 2013, he undertook ‘Adhikar Yatra’ in Punjab during which he walked 1108 kilometres in 30 days to meet the people and highlight the work done by Congress to empower and uplift them. He contested 2017 Punjab Legislative Assembly election, but lost to Baldev Singh Khaira of Shiromani Akali Dal.

=== 2022 Punjab Assembly Elections ===
Vikramjit Singh Chaudhary won 2022 Punjab Legislative Assembly election by defeating sitting MLA Baldev Singh Khaira by 12,303 votes, which was the highest winning margin in Phillaur constituency since India's Independence and the highest winning margin among Congress candidates in Punjab in the 2022 elections.

== Assets and liabilities declared during elections ==
During the 2022 Punjab Legislative Assembly election, he declared Rs. 7,98,07,230 as an overall financial asset and Rs. 35,96,360 as financial liability.
