= Gurkanwal Kaur =

Indian politician

Member Punjab Legislative Assembly
- In office 2002–2007
- Preceded by: Tej Parkash Singh
- Succeeded by: Jagbir Singh Brar
- Constituency: Jalandhar Cantt Assembly Constituency

Personal details
- Party: Indian National Congress (2002–2017); Bharatiya Janata Party (2017–present)
- Parent: Beant Singh (father)
- Occupation: Politician

Gurkanwal Kaur is an Indian Politician from the state of Punjab. Kaur represented the Jalandhar Cantt Assembly Constituency from 2002 to 2007. Kaur was from the Indian National Congress but in 2017 she joined Bharatiya Janata Party in the presence of Union finance minister Arun Jaitley and Punjab BJP president, Vijay Sampla.

== Family ==
Kaur's brother Tej Parkash Singh was a minister in the Punjab government and her father Beant Singh was the Chief Minister of Punjab from 1992 to 1995.

== See also ==
- Political families of Punjab, India
