= Balkar Singh =

Indian politician

MLA, Punjab Legislative Assembly
- Incumbent
- Assumed office 2022
- Constituency: Kartarpur
- Majority: Aam Aadmi Party

Personal details
- Party: Aam Aadmi Party
- Occupation: Politician,
- Profession: retired Police officer

Balkar Singh is an Indian politician and the MLA representing the Kartarpur Assembly constituency in the Punjab Legislative Assembly. He is a member of the Aam Aadmi Party.

Balkar worked in the Punjab police and retired as Deputy Commissioner of Police from Jalandhar in January 2021.

== Member of Legislative Assembly ==
He represents the Kartarpur Assembly constituency as MLA in Punjab Assembly. The Aam Aadmi Party gained a strong 79% majority in the sixteenth Punjab Legislative Assembly by winning 92 out of 117 seats in the 2022 Punjab Legislative Assembly election. MP Bhagwant Mann was sworn in as Chief Minister on 16 March 2022.

Committee assignments of Punjab Legislative Assembly

- Member (2022–23) Committee on Public Accounts
- Member (2022–23) Committee on Government Assurances

== Electoral performance ==
Punjab Assembly election, 2022: Kartarpur
Party	Candidate	Votes	%	±%
AAP	Balkar Singh	41,830	33.80	▲9.87
INC	Chaudhary Surinder Singh	37,256	30.10	▼7.20
BSP	Advocate Balwinder Kumar	33,709	27.20	▲23.10
BJP	Surinder Mahey	5,518	4.5	New
NOTA	None of the above	1,137	0.6	
Majority		4,574	3.7	
Turnout		124,988	67.7	
Registered electors		184,760		

== Controversy ==
In May 2024, The National Commission for Women called for a probe into allegations of sexual misconduct by Singh. He was accused of engaging in inappropriate sexual conduct during a video call with a 21-year woman seeking employment.

State Legislative Assembly
Preceded by -	Member of the Punjab Legislative Assembly from Kartarpur Assembly constituency 2022 –	Incumbent
