= Gurkirat =

Gurkirat or Gurkeerat is a given name. Notable people with the name include:

- Gurkirat Singh (born 2003), Indian professional footballer
- Gurkirat Singh Kotli (born 1973), Indian politician
- Gurkeerat Singh (born 1990), Indian cricketer
