= Seth Kishan Dass =

Indian politician

- Born: 1896; Jalandhar, Punjab Province (British India)
- Died: 1989 (aged 92–93); Bootan Mandi, Jalandhar, Punjab
- Occupations: politician, dalit activist, social reformer
- Political party: Republican Party of India
- Movement: Ad-Dharm movement

Seth Kishan Dass was a leather trader, propagator of the Ad-Dharm movement, and a politician.

== Biography ==
Seth Kishan Das was born in Mohalla Ramdaspura, Jalandhar. He was born with the Klare surname of the Chamar caste. He established himself as a prosperous leather merchant. Being an Ambedkarite, he was instrumental in bringing Babasaheb Ambedkar at Bootan Mandi in Jalandhar for the campaign in the 1951 Punjab elections.

He was elected in the first Punjab Legislative Assembly elections in 1937 and won from Jullundur Assembly Constituency (now Adampur) by beating Master Gurbanta Singh, another Ad-Dharm member. But he lost in 1946 Punjab Provincial Assembly elections. He was a member of the All India Scheduled Castes Federation and President of the Punjab unit of SCF.

His sons were Seth Prem Raj and Seth Mool Raj who became the Director of Punjab Mega Leather Cluster. Ltd and Avinash Tanneries at Jalandhar. His grandsons, Steven Kaler and Avinash Chander, are, respectively, an MLA from Phillaur and chief parliamentary secretary for Higher Education & Languages Dept.

Seth Kishan Das provided financial support to construct the 'Ad Dharam' building, which later became Guru Ravidass High School.
