= Kartarpur Assembly constituency =

Legislative Assembly constituency in Punjab State, India

Coordinates: 31.44°N 75.5°E

Kartarpur
- Constituency No. 33 for the Punjab Legislative Assembly

Constituency details
- Country: India
- State: Punjab
- District: Jalandhar
- Lok Sabha constituency: Jalandhar
- Total electors: 184,762
- Reservation: SC

Member of Legislative Assembly
- 16th Punjab Legislative Assembly
- Incumbent Balkar Singh
- Party: Aam Aadmi Party
- Elected year: 2022

Kartarpur is one of the 117 Legislative Assembly constituencies of Punjab state in India. It is part of Jalandhar district and is reserved for candidates belonging to the Scheduled Castes.

== Members of the Legislative Assembly ==
Most successful parties from Kartarpur Vidhan Sabha
1. INC (10 Times) (62.5%)
2. SAD (3 Times) (18.8%)
3. AAP (1 Time) (6.25%)
4. RPI (1 Time) (6.25%)
5. INC (I) (1 Time) (6.25%)

Year	Member	Party
1952	Gurdial Singh	Indian National Congress
1957	Karam Singh	Indian National Congress
1957	Gurbanta Singh	Indian National Congress
1962	Gurbanta Singh	Indian National Congress
1967	P. Ram	Republican Party of India
1969	Gurbanta Singh	Indian National Congress
1972	Gurbanta Singh	Indian National Congress
1977	Bhagat Singh	Shiromani Akali Dal
1980	Chaudhary Jagjit Singh	Indian National Congress (Indira)
1985	Chaudhary Jagjit Singh	Indian National Congress
1992	Chaudhary Jagjit Singh	Indian National Congress
1997	Chaudhary Jagjit Singh	Indian National Congress
2002	Chaudhary Jagjit Singh	Indian National Congress
2007	Avinash Chander	Shiromani Akali Dal
2012	Sarwan Singh Phillaur	Shiromani Akali Dal
2017	Chaudhary Surinder Singh	Indian National Congress
2022	Balkar Singh	Aam Aadmi Party

== Election results ==
=== 2027 ===
Punjab Assembly election, 2027: Kartarpur
Party	Candidate	Votes	%	±%
AAP	Balkar Singh			
AD (WPD)				New entry
INC				
BSP				
SAD				New entry
BJP				
NOTA	None of the above			
Majority				
Turnout				

=== 2022 ===
Punjab Assembly election, 2022: Kartarpur
Party	Candidate	Votes	%	±%
AAP	Balkar Singh	41,830	33.80	▲9.87
INC	Chaudhary Surinder Singh	37,256	30.10	▼7.20
BSP	Advocate Balwinder Kumar	33,709	27.20	▲23.10
BJP	Surinder Mahey	5,518	4.5	New
NOTA	None of the above	1,137	0.6	
Majority		4,574	3.7	
Turnout		124,988	67.7	
Registered electors		184,760		

=== 2017 ===
Punjab Assembly election, 2017: Kartarpur
Party	Candidate	Votes	%	±%
INC	Chaudhary Surinder Singh	46,729	37.3	
SAD	Seth Sat Paul	40,709	32.5	
AAP	Chander Kumar Grewal	29,981	23.93	
BSP	Balwinder Kumar	5,208	4.1	
NOTA	None of the above	1,086	0.87	
Majority		6,020	4.8	
Turnout		125,264	74.0	
Registered electors		170,850		

=== 2012 ===
Punjab Assembly election, 2012: Kartarpur
Party	Candidate	Votes	%	±%
SAD	Sarwan Singh Phillaur	48,484	41.9	
INC	Chaudhary Jagjit Singh	47,661	41.2	
BSP	Kamal Dev	13,886	12.0	
Majority		823	0.7	
Turnout		115,617	77.6	
Registered electors		149,037		

== See also ==
- List of constituencies of the Punjab Legislative Assembly
- Jalandhar district
