= Baldev Singh Khaira =

Indian politician

Punjab Legislative Assembly
- In office 2017–2022
- Preceded by: Avinash Chander
- Succeeded by: Vikramjit Singh Chaudhary
- Constituency: Phillaur

Personal details
- Born: 18 October 1979 (age 46)
- Party: SAD
- Spouse: Bhawana Khosla
- Profession: Politician

Baldev Singh Khaira (born 18 October 1979) is an Indian politician and a member of SAD. In 2017, he was elected as the member of the Punjab Legislative Assembly from Phillaur.

== Constituency ==
Singh Khaira represents the Phillaur. Singh Khaira won the Phillaur on an SAD ticket, Singh Khaira beat the member of the Punjab Legislative Assembly Vikramjit Singh Chaudhary of the INC by over 3477 votes.

== Political party ==
Singh Khaira is from the SAD and he is also the MLA of Phillaur.
