= Chaudhary Surinder Singh =

Indian politician

MLA, Punjab
- In office 2017–2022
- Preceded by: Sarwan Singh Phillaur
- Constituency: Kartarpur

Personal details
- Born: 30 December 1956 (age 69) Dhaliwal, Jalandhar, Punjab, India
- Party: Indian National Congress
- Spouse: Varinder Kaur
- Children: Yashwinder, Navinder and Damanvir Singh Chaudhary

Chaudhary Surinder Singh (born 30 December 1956) is an Indian politician and a member of Indian National Congress.

== Personal life ==
Surinder Singh was born to Chaudhary Jagjit Singh and Gurbachan Kaur at Dhaliwal, Jalandhar, Punjab. He belongs to one of the biggest political clans of Punjab. His grandfather, Master Gurbanta Singh, father Chaudhary Jagjit Singh and uncle, Santokh Singh Chaudhary are tallest Dalit leaders of INC in state.

He did his schooling from Seventh-Day Adventist Sr. Sec. School, Jalandhar Cantt, B.A. from D.A.V. College, Jalandhar and M.A (history) from Punjab University, Chandigarh.

He is married to Varinder Kaur, who became sarpanch of Village Dhaliwal. They have two daughters Mrs. Yashwinder who is married to Deep Kamal (DSP) and Miss Navinder who is settled in Canada now. In 2019, Navinder wanted to become the sarpanch of village Dhaliwal and also filled the nomination paper for it but due to her study circumstances she could not participate in sarpanch contest. Chaudhary Surinder Singh has a son Damanvir Singh Chaudhary who is taking part with him in many political activities. He is also senior vice president of MGSM Janta College Kartarpur, Jalandhar.

== Politics ==
He started his career as sarpanch of Dhaliwal village (Jalandhar) from 1980-1997. Later he became chairman of Panchayat Samiti (1994-1998), chairman of Market Committee (1996-1999) and chairman of Zila Parishad (2003-2008)-Jalandhar. In 2017 Punjab Legislative Assembly elections he got elected from Kartarpur constituency. He won with 6020 votes and became MLA. He always follows his grandfather and father footprints and work as a social worker.
