= Fatehgarh Sahib Assembly constituency =

Legislative Assembly constituency in Punjab State, India

Coordinates: 30.65°N 76.39°E

Fatehgarh Sahib
- Constituency No. 55 for the Punjab Legislative Assembly

Constituency details
- Country: India
- State: Punjab
- District: Fatehgarh Sahib
- Lok Sabha constituency: Fatehgarh Sahib
- Total electors: 161,754 (in 2022)
- Reservation: None

Member of Legislative Assembly
- 16th Punjab Legislative Assembly
- Incumbent Lakhbir Singh Rai
- Party: Aam Aadmi Party
- Elected year: 2022

Fatehgarh Sahib Assembly constituency (Sl. No.: 55) is a Punjab Legislative Assembly constituency in Fatehgarh Sahib district, Punjab state, India.

== Members of the Legislative Assembly ==
Most successful parties from Fatehgarh Sahib Vidhan Sabha
1. INC (2 Times) (66.7%)
2. AAP (1 Time) (33.3%)

Year	Member	Party
2012	Kuljit Singh Nagra	Indian National Congress
2017	Kuljit Singh Nagra	Indian National Congress
2022	Lakhbir Singh Rai	Aam Aadmi Party

== Election results ==
=== 2027 ===
Punjab Assembly election, 2027: Fatehgarh Sahib
Party	Candidate	Votes	%	±%
AAP	Lakhbir Singh Rai			
AD (WPD)				New entry
INC				
BSP				
SAD				
SAD(A)	Emaan Singh Mann			
BJP				
NOTA	None of the above			
Majority				
Turnout				

=== 2022 ===
Punjab Assembly election, 2022: Fatehgarh Sahib
Party	Candidate	Votes	%	±%
AAP	Lakhbir Singh Rai	57,706	45.98	▲18.46
INC	Kuljit Singh Nagra	25,507	20.32	▼26.63
BJP	Didar Singh Bhatti	14,186	11.3	New entry
SAD(A)	Emaan Singh Mann	12,286	9.79	▲8.52
SAD	Jagdeep Singh Cheema	10,922	8.70	▼14.86
SSP	Sarbjeet Singh	2,159	1.72	New entry
NOTA	None of the above	765		
Majority		32,199	25.66	
Turnout				
Registered electors		161,754		
AAP gain from INC				

=== 2017 ===
Punjab Assembly election, 2017: Fatehgarh Sahib
Party	Candidate	Votes	%	±%
INC	Kuljit Singh Nagra	58,205	46.95	▲14.16
SAD	Didar Singh Bhatti	34,338	23.56	▼6.06
AAP	Lakhbir Singh Rai	29,393	27.52	New entry
SAD(A)	Kuldip Singh	1,589	1.27	▼1.63
NOTA	None of the above	803	0.64	
Majority		23,867	19.12	
Turnout		124,777	83.34	
Registered electors		149,715		
INC hold		Swing		

=== 2012 ===
Punjab Assembly election, 2012: Fatehgarh Sahib
Party	Candidate	Votes	%	±%
INC	Kuljit Singh Nagra	36,573	32.79	New entry
SAD	Prem Singh Chandumajra	33,035	29.62	New entry
PPoP	Didar Singh Bhatti	32,065	28.75	New entry
SAD(A)	Simranjit Singh Mann	3,234	2.9	New entry
Independent	Harbans Lal	2,163	1.94	New entry
BSP	Tarlochan Singh	1,748	1.57	New entry
Majority		3,538	3.17	
Turnout		111,529	84.45	
Registered electors		149,715		
INC win (new seat)				

== See also ==
Fatehgarh Sahib Lok Sabha constituency
