= Sarwan Singh Phillaur =

Indian politician

MLA, Punjab
- In office 1977 - 1990
- Preceded by: Surjit Singh Atwal
- Succeeded by: Santokh Singh Chaudhary
- Constituency: Phillaur
- In office 1997 -2002
- Preceded by: Santokh Singh Chaudhary
- Succeeded by: Santokh Singh Chaudhary
- Constituency: Phillaur
- In office 2007 -2012
- Preceded by: Santokh Singh Chaudhary
- Succeeded by: Avinash Chander
- Constituency: Phillaur
- In office 2012 - 2017
- Preceded by: Avinash Chander
- Constituency: Kartarpur

Minister for Welfare of SCs and BCs
- In office 1997-2002
- Chief Minister: Parkash Singh Badal
- Succeeded by: Gurkanwal Kaur

Minister for Tourism
- In office 2012 – 2017
- Chief Minister: Parkash Singh Badal
- Preceded by: Harbans Kaur Dullo

Personal details
- Born: Phillaur
- Party: United Akali Dal
- Children: Damanvir Singh Phillaur
- Website: http://sarwansinghphillaur.com

Sarwan Singh Phillaur is an Indian politician who served as a Minister for Jails, Tourism, Cultural Affairs and Printing and Stationery in the Punjab Government.

== Personal life ==
Phillaur was born on May 30, 1948, in Chak Des Raj, a village in Phillaur, Jalandhar district. He hails from the Ravidassia community and is married to Nirmaljit Kaur; they have two children: a son, Damanvir Singh Phillaur, and a daughter, Amanpreet Kaur.

== Political career ==
He was elected to the Punjab Legislative Assembly in 1977 on an Akali Dal ticket from Phillaur for first time. He was re-elected from Phillaur in 1980, 1985, 1997 and 2007. In 2012, he successfully contested from Kartarpur. Presently he is cabinet minister and holding portfolio of Jails, Tourism, Cultural Affairs and Printing and Stationery. In 1997, he was Minister for Welfare of Scheduled Castes and Backward Classes.

He made headlines in 2014 when he resigned from the Cabinet on moral grounds following media reports concerning the alleged involvement of a family member in a drug racket; later, his properties, as well as those of his son, were provisionally attached by the Enforcement Directorate in connection with investigations. In 2016, following disagreements over being denied a ticket, he left SAD and joined the Indian National Congress, but in 2022, he and his son joined the breakaway Shiromani Akali Dal (Sanyukt).

== Achievements ==
He is credited with projects such as the Jang-e-Azadi Memorial and a Centre for Excellence for Vegetables in Kartarpur, for which he initiated proposals of land allocation while he was a minister. This reflects work towards cultural heritage and agricultural education/agribusiness support in his constituency. Under his tenure, improvements were noted in infrastructure like the six-laning of the national highway, better inner roads in Kartarpur, and better connectivity.
