= Ad-Dharmi =

Chamar sect in Punjab, India

The Ad-Dharmi (/ˌæd ˈdɑːrmi/; lit. 'primal spiritual path') is a sect in the state of Punjab, India, and was a precursor movement of the Ravidassia religion that arose in 1920. The term Ad-Dharm came into popular usage in the early part of the 20th century, when many followers of Ravidas who had converted to Sikhism were severely discriminated against due to their low-caste status, even though the Sikh religion is strictly against the caste system in its theology. Many of these converts stopped attending Sikh gurdwaras controlled by Jat Sikhs and built their own shrines upon arrival in the UK, Canada, and Fiji Island. In colonial Punjab, the movement was one of the autonomous mobilizations established by disenfranchised Dalits. Ad-Dharmis comprise 11.48% of the total of Scheduled Caste communities in Punjab.

== History ==
The Adi-movements were various Dalit religious movements to break away from Hinduism that arose in the 1910s and 1920s in India, with the Ad-Dharmis being one of the Adi-movements and the first to develop the concept of "Adi" amongst them. These movements arose as a reaction to Jyotiba Phule's assertion that the Brahmins were foreign Aryans who came to India and subjugated the indigenous races, such as the Dalits. The Chamars of Punjab, traditionally disenfranchised leather-workers, had found greater prosperity, especially in the Doaba region, during the colonial-period due to British demands for boots, shoes, and other leather-based goods. This allowed some Chamars to become educated and travel abroad, such as to the U.S. or England, where they were exposed to leftist thought. This upward mobility amongst the Chamars engendered movements by the early 1920's to improve their social-standing in society. Most of the early figures of the Ad-Dharmi movement had initially been members of the Arya Samaj movement and attempted to invoke social reform from within that organization, although they were ideologically opposed by much of the Arya Samaj, such as Sant Ram of Hoshiarpur establishing the Jat-Pat-Todak Mandal ("Society for the Abolition of Caste") within the Arya Samaj, although with not much success, with the Arya Samaj heads opposing him, causing him to leave the Arya Samaj.

The Ad-Dharm movement was started in the 1920s as a Chamar religious movement with the aim of establishing a distinct religious identity, being inspired by the 16th century Bhakti-era saint Ravidas. The Ad-Dharmi Dalits unified as a faith in 1925 during British rule in India. The founders of the Ad-Dharm Movement were Mangu Ram Mugowalia (a founding member of the Ghadar Party, he became the president of the executive committee of the Ad-Dharmis), Master Gurbanta Singh (a senior Congress leader), B. L. Gherra, and Pandit Hari Ram (Pandori Bibi), who served as the organization's secretary. Mangu Ram had been educated in the United States and was a Ghadarite, with him having a strong disposition against the concept of untouchability. Initially, Mangu Ram tried working with the Arya Samaj, founding a school for lower-castes within the framework of the Arya Samaj, but lost hope and decided to launch a separate identity apart from Hinduism and Sikhism, known as Ad-Dhama. The movement envisioned itself as a separate religion, apart from the prevailing religions of Hinduism, Sikhism, Islam, or Christianity, believing that they had existed since ancient times as a distinct quom (religious group).

The movement projected Guru Ravidas, the 14th century Bhakti Movement saint, as their spiritual guru and adopted a sacred book called Ad Parkash for their separate ritual traditions, promoting Ravidas' poetry. The movement promoted an anti-caste agenda via texts, posters, and pamphlets. One poster from 1927 stated:

We are the original people of this country and our religion is Ad Dharma. The Hindu qaum came from outside and enslaved us. When the original counch was sounded, all the brothers came together - chamar, churha, sainsi, bhanrje, bhil, all the untouchables - to make their problems known. Brothers, there are seventy million of us listed as Hindus, separate us and make us free ... There was a time when we ruled India, brothers, and the land belonged to us ... Come together to form a better life.

— Ad-Dharma, 1927 poster (republished in Juergensmeyer 1982, 86)

The Adi-Dharmis of Punjab had communication with the Adi-Hindu movement of Uttar Pradesh, with the leader of the latter movement, Swami Achyutanand, requesting a meeting of the Ad-Dharmis and Adi-Hindus of Punjab, Uttar Pradesh, and Delhi in 1926 to organize a united force. There were also some tentative calls for an independent state known as Achhutistan ("land for untouchables").

In 1931, the British colonial administration recognized the Ad-Dharmis as a separate religious community apart from Hinduism and Sikhism. The Hindu leaders had opposed the Ad-Dharmis being classified as a distinct religious group in the 1931 census but the Ad-Dharmis lobbied for it with successful results. In the 1931 census, over 450,000 individuals registered themselves as members of the new indigenous faith called Ad Dharam ("Original Religion"). In the census results for Punjab specifically in 1931, a total of 418,789 persons identified themselves as Ad-Dharmis, around 10% of the total low-caste population of Punjab (with over 80% of lower-castes in Jalandhar and Hoshiarpur districts identifying themselves as Ad-Dharmis), meaning they numerically rivalled the total Christian population of the province. However, other areas of Punjab saw a suppression of the Ad-Dharmi identity and it did not become adopted on the same scale due to opposition by dominant religious groups.

In the aftermath of the 1931 census, the Ad-Dharmis joined Ambedkar's Scheduled Castes Federation, later becoming the Republican Party of India, however comparatively few Ad-Dharmis of the Punjab followed Ambedkar with his adoption of Buddhism when compared to his followers in other areas. After Indian independence in 1947, the Ad-Dharmis were clubbed under the Hindu scheduled-castes of Punjab, which began to erode their separate religious identity as they now increasingly saw themselves as members of the Hindu scheduled-castes. Manmohan Singh Gill (2003) notes that in a 1996 survey in Punjab, 98.3% of Ad-Dharmis saw themselves as a "caste group", whilst only 1.6% viewed themselves as a "separate religious community". In the second half of the 20th century, Ad-Dharmis abandoned their traditional agricultural roles in rural Punjab under the jajmani system for other occupations in other sectors of the economy, increasing their cultural and economic independence from the dominant castes, especially in Doaba. This led them to gain more political influence in the state of Punjab, India but casteist discrimination continues, especially in rural Punjab, in concealed ways despite there no longer being notions of pollution being followed.

In 2003, Ad-Dharmis of Talhan village in Jalandhar district launched a movement to assert their right to the management committee of a local religious site.

=== Decline ===
In 1946, the Ad-Dharmis took-on the new name: Ravi Dass Mandal. However, this faith and movement gradually declined after India gained independence due to the leaders' increasing involvement in state politics and the government's reservation policy, which focused only on providing reservations for low-caste individuals from Hindu, Sikh, and Buddhist communities. Furthermore, there were contradictions in the Ad-Dharmi movement, as although they created a separate religious identity for Dalits away from Hinduism, in their ideology they considered themselves as the "first" and "true" Hindus, whilst also considering themselves to pre-date Hinduism. Also, their movement took inspiration from the Bhakti movement, which was a Hindu movement, which contradicted with their attempts at claiming a separate, non-Hindu identity. Due to the post-independence reservation system classifying Ad-Dharmis under the Hindu scheduled-castes of Punjab, Ad-Dharmis have increasingly viewed themselves as a caste rather than a separate religious group. In 2003, there arose a caste-based conflict in Talhan village of Punjab over the management of a local shrine which involved Ad-Dharmis. Efforts to revive the Ad-Dharmi religious movement in post-independence Punjab have not been successful.

== Religion ==
From 1920 to 1925, the Ad-Dharmi movement arose, which consolidated a separate religious identity centered on Ravidas. Around the same time, the Singh Sabha movement of Sikhism was well underway, which also consolidated for a separate Sikh identity apart from Hinduism. Prominent leaders and thinkers of both movements had been educated in Arya Samajist institutions, thus they both adopted an Arya Samaj-approach to push for their separate identities, combined with a Judeo-Christian understanding of religion due to Christian missionary and British colonial influence (i.e., a central scripture to base their religion around). Both the Ravidas-aligned movements and Singh Sabhaists revered the Guru Granth Sahib, the primary scripture of Sikhism. However, the Ravidasis celebrated the scripture primarily due to it containing the most notable and earliest-recorded compositions linked to Ravidas. Thus, Ravidasis placed their prime figure's bani on a higher level of importance than the bani found in the scripture authored by others. The Ad-Dharmis compiled a holy-book known as the Ad Prakash ('original light'), wherein they elevated the historical Ravidas as their central figure, thereby giving a spiritual basis to their modern religious movement, with Ravidas being imagined as a main "guru" and his poetry forming the basis of their beliefs. Despite this, the Sikh scripture, the Guru Granth Sahib, continued to be used by them in their sacred spaces.

The movement named the historical saints Valmiki, Ravidas, Kabir, and Namdev, as their religious figures. Furthermore, they completely rejected the caste-system as they believed the Divine prevailed everywhere in the world, including within lower-castes. In order to emphasise their distinct religious identity, the Ad-Dharmis adopted three symbols: wearing red clothing, the phrase soham (lit. 'I'm it'), referring to Vedantic concept of the primacy of the soul), and the salutation Jai Guru Dev (lit. 'victory to the great God'). The Ad-Dharmis are closer in affinity to Sikhism than Hinduism, especially in their daily practices. They revere the Guru Granth Sahib, which contains hymns attributed to Ravidas, and perform their weddings and other ceremonies as per Sikh rites. However, few Ad-Dharmis wear turbans or maintain kesh (uncut hair), and their names are more similar to those kept by Punjabi Hindus. The Ravidasi temples are known as Ravidas Mandirs but are functionally more similar to Sikh gurdwaras, with the only difference being more focus placed on Ravidas when compared to mainstream Sikh gurdwaras, with their temples containing portraits of Ravidas. Thus, they can be classified as a form of sehajdhari Sikhs. The Ad-Dharmis had also compiled their own scripture, known as the Ad Prakash ('original light'), compiled through Ad-Dharmis working together with Ravidasi saints.

The Ad-Dharmi follow Guru Ravidas (now associated with the Ravidassia religion), and incorporate elements of Sikhism such as regarding the Guru Granth Sahib as their religious text. A turning point occurred after the killing of Ramananda Dass in Vienna, which deeply affected the community and led to the development of separate scriptures (Amritbani) and distinct religious customs. Each of their settlements typically contains gurdwaras and Ravidas Bhawans, which serve as centres of worship and as focal points for the local community.

== Ad-Dharmi diaspora ==
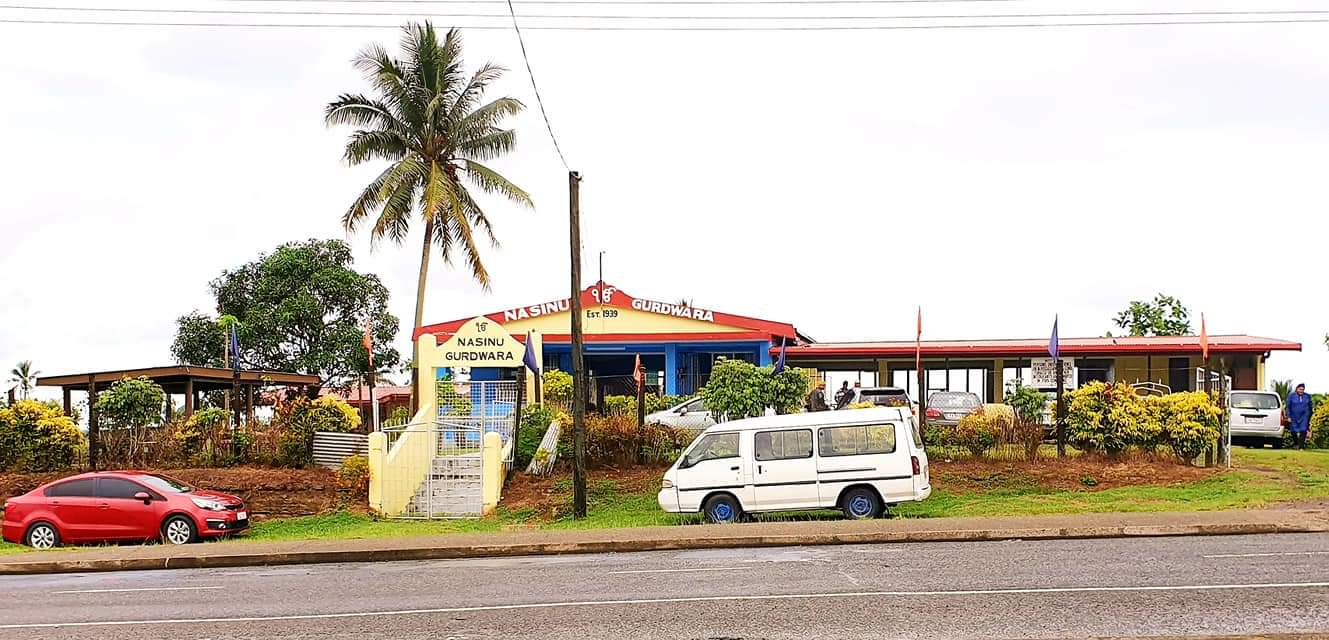
Gurdwara Guru Ravidass, Nasinu, Fiji Established in 1939

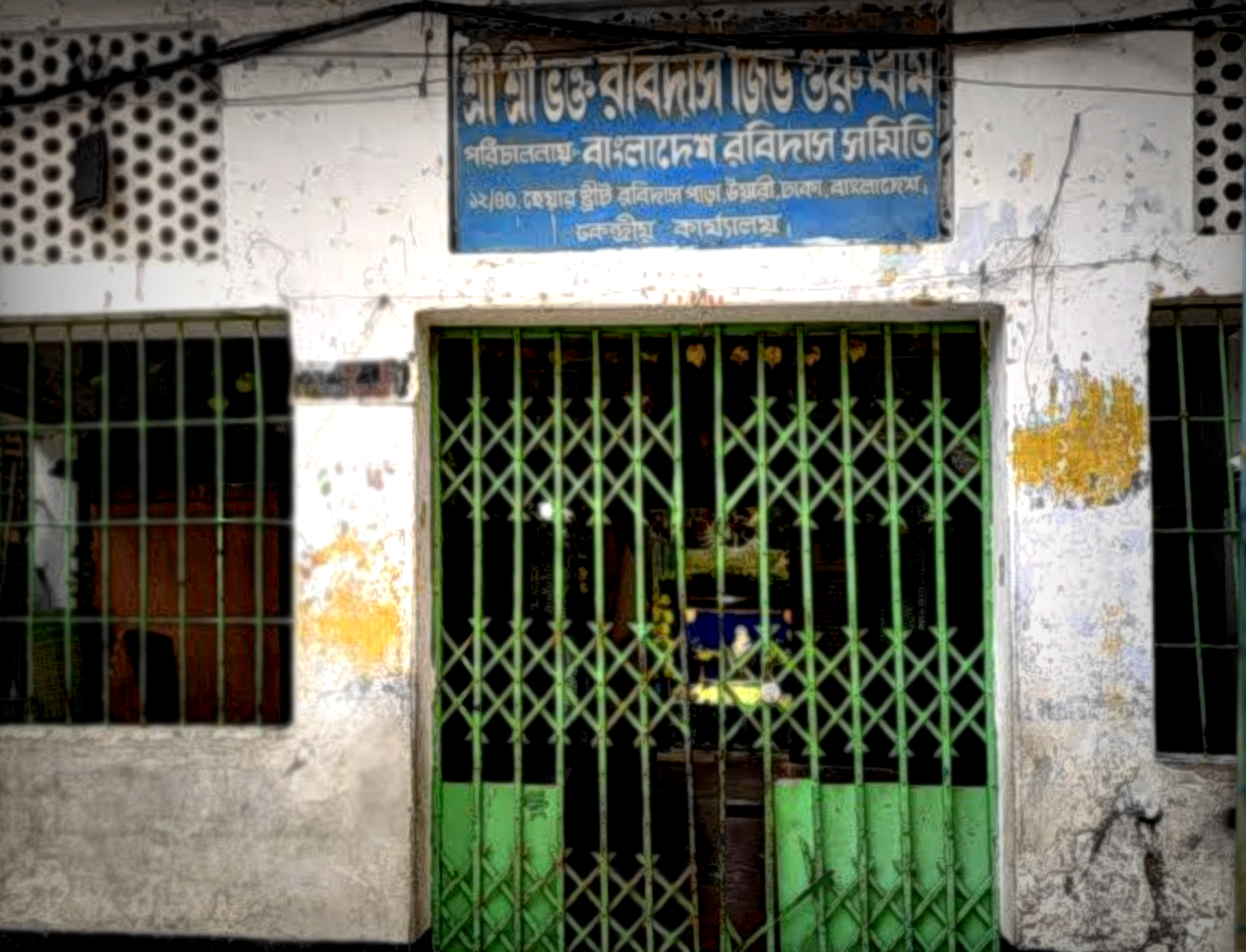
Bangladesh Ravidassia Association

The Ad-Dharmi Diaspora has flourished on Fiji Island, Canada, and in the United Kingdom since 1905. From 1905, when the Union Steam Ship Company of New Zealand began a regular service from Calcutta to Fiji, there was a regular flow of Ravidassia people from Punjab to Fiji. Ad-Dharmis can also be found in Pakistan, Bangladesh and Nepal. The first Shri Guru Ravidass Gurudwara outside India was established in 1939 in Nasinu on Fiji Island, and this Gurdwara was registered under the banner of the Addharm-Punjab Association.

For the outstanding volunteer-led service to the community in Bedfordshire, Ad Dharmi/Ravidassia Gurdwara in Luton received The King's Award for Voluntary Service. Susan Lousada, Lord Lieutenant of Bedfordshire, delivered the award on behalf of King Charles III, quoting the citation: "The volunteers of Shri Guru Ravidass Sangat are a beacon of light in a troubled world..." The award was officially presented during the 648th birth anniversary celebrations of Guru Ravidass, which attracted dignitaries such as mayor of Luton, local MPs, faith leaders, and representatives from Bedfordshire Police and the Council of Faiths.

== Demographics ==
Ad-Dharmis along with Ramdasia/Ravidasia (Chamar caste) in Punjab by district (2011)
Districts	2011 India census	
Districts	Ad-Dharmi/Ramdasia/Ravidasia caste population	%
Amritsar	31,774	1.28%
Barnala	90,526	15.18%
Bathinda	108,790	7.83%
Faridkot	26,903	4.35%
Fatehgarh Sahib	115,167	19.2%
Firozpur	31,581	1.56%
Gurdaspur	133,126	5.79%
Hoshiarpur	416,904	26.34%
Jalandhar	467,466	21.43%
Kapurthala	90,287	11.04%
Ludhiana	521,361	14.95%
Mansa	87,078	11.33%
Moga	31,206	3.14%
Sri Muktsar Sahib	50,017	5.54%
Patiala	192,545	10.18%
Rupnagar	115,155	16.85%
Sahibzada Ajit Singh Nagar	114,837	11.65%
Sangrur	261,317	21.72%
Nawanshahr	214,293	34.88%
Tarn Taran	3,618	0.32%

== Notable people ==
- Seth Kishan Dass—A leather trader, propagator of the Ad-Dharm movement, and a politician.
- Mangu Ram Mugowalia—Founding member of Ghadar Movement and Ad Dharm movement in Punjab
- Chaudhary Sadhu Ram—Elected Member of Parliament.
- Master Gurbanta Singh— Dalit leader of Punjab, educator and key person of Ad Dharm movement.

== See also ==
- Satnampanth
- Sadh
