= Talhan incident =

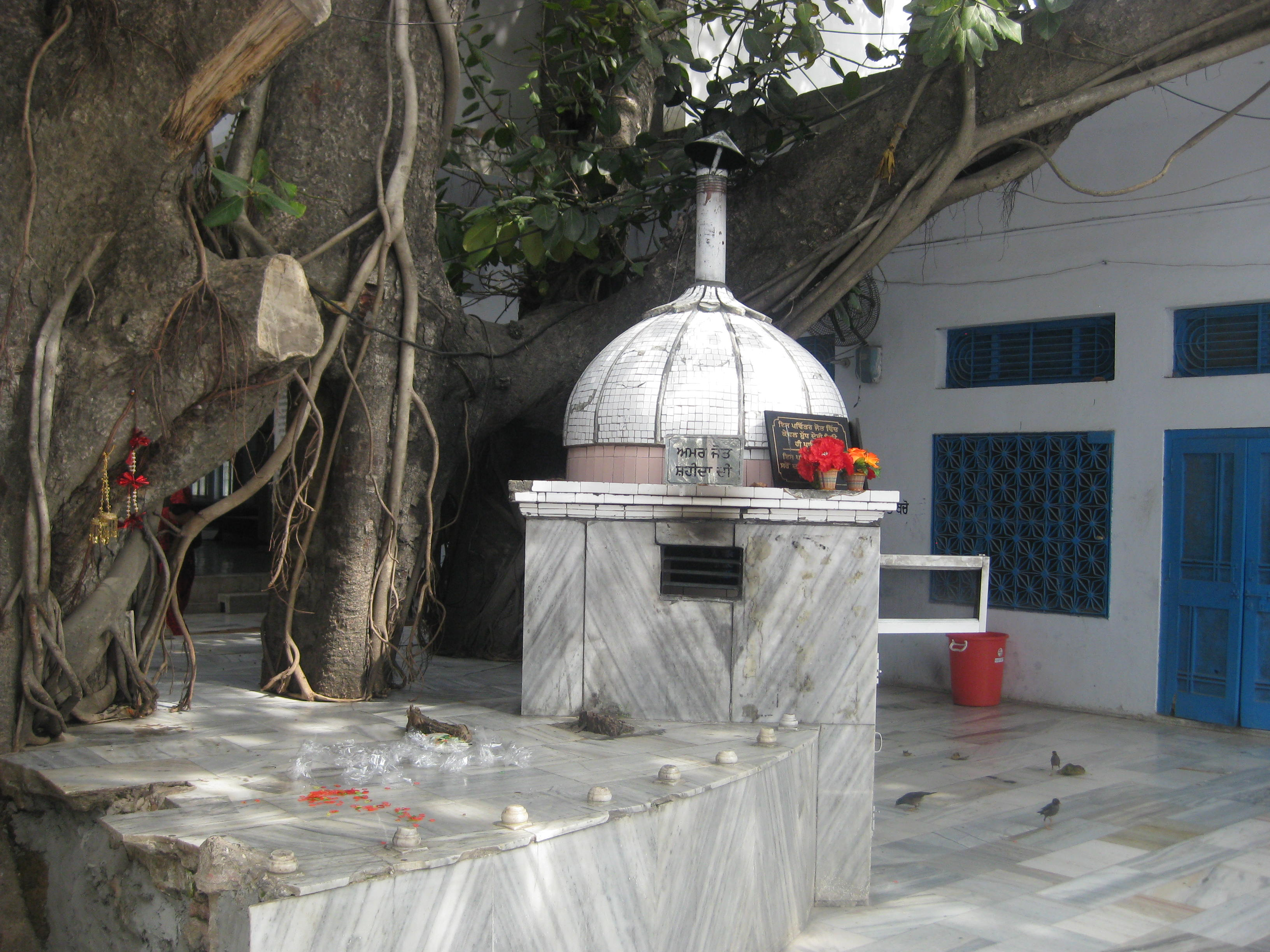
Shrine within the gurdwara complex of Baba Nihal Singh in Talhan, Jalandhar district

The Talhan incident, also known as the Talhan crisis or Talhan clash, refers to an event in 2003 where the village of Talhan in Jalandhar district, Punjab, India experienced a caste-related conflict between some Jatt Sikhs and members of the scheduled-caste over the management of a gurdwara in the village. The Dalits fought for an equal share of the economic resources associated with the shrine and asserted their social equality with the dominant castes of the area. The conflict began as local Dalits pushed for representation in the management body of a samadh dedicated to a local Sikh saint, leading to conflict with the dominant Jats of the village. The Jatts attempted to socially boycott the Dalits to challenge the demand but failed to stop the movement due to the Dalits' mobilization and organization in the village. Eventually, the Dalits of Talhan were successful in obtaining representation at the shrine's management committee, which emboldened other Dalit movement across the state of Punjab. The incident is an example of the existence of the caste-system being practiced amongst contemporary Sikhs. It is an example of Dalits asserting for caste equality, equal share in resources, balanced power-structures, improved social-dignity, and maintaining their religious traditions.

Local Dalits pushed for representation in the management body of a samadh dedicated to a local Sikh saint, leading to conflict with the dominant Jats of the village. The Dalits demanded representation on the committee managing the gurdwara. The Chamars came out in force and confronted the Randhawa and Bains Jat Sikh landlords, who refused to give the Chamars a share on the governing committee of a shrine dedicated to Shaheed Baba Nihal Singh. Chamars fought a four-year court battle with the landlords and their allies, including the Punjab Police. In that time Jats conducted several boycotts against the Chamars. The Jat Sikhs and their allies cut off the power supply to their homes. In addition, various scuffles and fights set Chamar youths armed with lathis, rocks, bricks, soda bottles and anything they could find fought Jat Sikh landlords, youths and the Punjab police.

== Background ==
Sikhism opposes discrimination based on the caste system and stresses upon equality. However, while the cruel features of the Indian caste system are diminished in Punjab and untouchability is not practiced, discrimination against Dalits continues within a Sikh context, with casteist beliefs and practices hidden rather than being out in the open. Furthermore, casteism in Punjab is more related to agrarianism rather than Brahminism. Increased economic development in Punjab led to increasing power of the Dalits of the state, improving their position in society as they asset their identity and rights. Traditionally, the Dalits were landless, agricultural labourers highly dependant on Jatt landlords but they have, especially Ad-Dharmis, have since moved into other sectors of the economy, which has increased their independence from the pre-existing power structures and traditional hierarchies, improving their ability to challenge casteism, first in urban areas and eventually even in rural parts of the region. One of the Dalit groups, the Ad-Dharmis (originally Chamars), are closer in affinity to Sikhism than Hinduism.

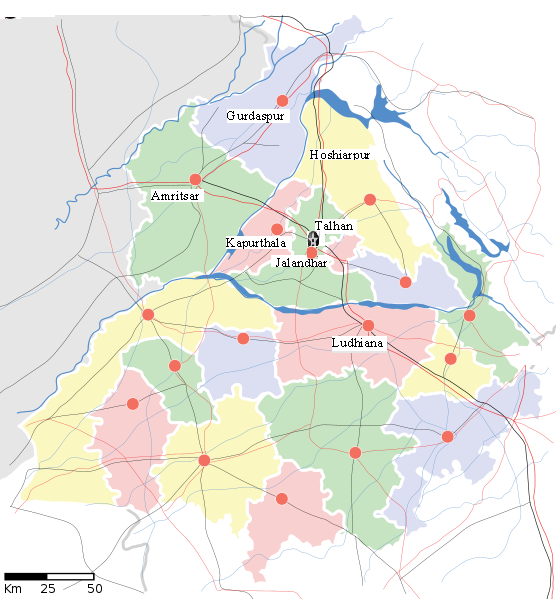
Location of Talhan village in Punjab, India

Talhan village is located around ten kilometres from Jalandhar city, relations between the locally dominant Jatts and Ad-Dharmis had been strained leading-up to the incident. The Adi-Dharmis of the village and the wider Doaba region were originally downtrodden and economically-disadvantaged but gained increasing prosperity due to the establishment of a cantonment in Jalandhar in the second half of the 19th century during the British colonial-period by finding work supplying leather needed for military boots and in recent times due to mobilizations and cultural awakenings. However, the 1901 Land Alienation Act hurt the prospects of the Dalits of Punjab, barring them from owning land. The Ad-Dharmi movement was launched by Mangoo Ram in the 1920s to improve the prospects of the lower-castes of Punjab, which mobilized the Dalits in the Doaba region. After partition in 1947 and subsequent independence of India, the 1901 Land Alienation Act was revoked but the Dalits were still left in a worse-off position compared to the other castes due to its effects. The Dalits of the region lived in pucca houses despite being landless, their children were educated, and some worked in occupations in urban areas or abroad in the West or Gulf region. Thus, the traditional jajmani system was weakened in the Doaba region. Aside from the shrine of Baba Nihal Singh, there were three main gurdwaras within the village, a main gurdwara built by the Jats, a Ramgarhia gurdwara, and a Ravidasi temple, with all the temples theoretically being open-for-all but mostly visited by particular castes. The village also had a literacy rate of 95%, high for India. The Jatts of Talhan were working in dairy-enterprises, transportation sector, or were factory-workers.

Baba Nihal Singh was a local Sikh religious figure or fakir of the Ramgarhia caste who lived in the neighbouring village of Dakoha. He is said to have constructed fixed, wheel-like structures known as gandh in newly-made wells for the purpose of obtaining potable water. While building one of these wheel structures for a well, he is said to have died, with his death being viewed as a sacrifice (martyrdom) for the community, thus he became revered as both a baba and shaheed. The location where Nihal Singh's body was cremated had a samadh structure constructed over it, now within Talhan village. An eternal-flame was maintained nearby the samadh, being kept burning by Harnam Singh, an aide of Nihal Singh. After Harnam Singh died, another samadh was constructed nearby the original samadh of Nihal Singh, with both the samadhs gradually gaining religious significance in the local area, being venerated by people regardless of their caste. In due time, these two commemorative structures were transformed into a shrine, with eventually a Sikh structure coming-up inbetween the two samadhs with the Guru Granth Sahib being installed within it in prakash. The management committee was trying to convert the samadh shrine into a proper Sikh gurdwara. On the death anniversary of Nihal Singh, a mela fair was held in his memory at the shrine. A committee was formed to manage the shrine and its finances, with the members of the committee consisting of members of "powerful individuals" (mostly Jatts) of the local village and surroundings. In the year 2003, the annual offerings at the shrine amounted to between 30 and 50 million rupees (three to five crore rupees). Whilst an election was held for electing members of the 13-member body was held annually in mid-January on Maghi, not everyone could vote in the election. The management committee's thirteen members was overwhelmingly from Jatt backgrounds despite Talhan's population being 65% Ad-Dharmi and only 25% Jatt, with the remainder being Ramgarhias, Jhirs, and Lohars. The Ad-Dharmis were the only Dalit population of Talhan and although some non-Jatt castes have been represented on the shrine's management body before, no Dalit had ever been elected to it, despite Ad-Dharmis comprising the majority of the locality's population. The management committee was also allegedly corrupt and misappropriating funds from the golak.

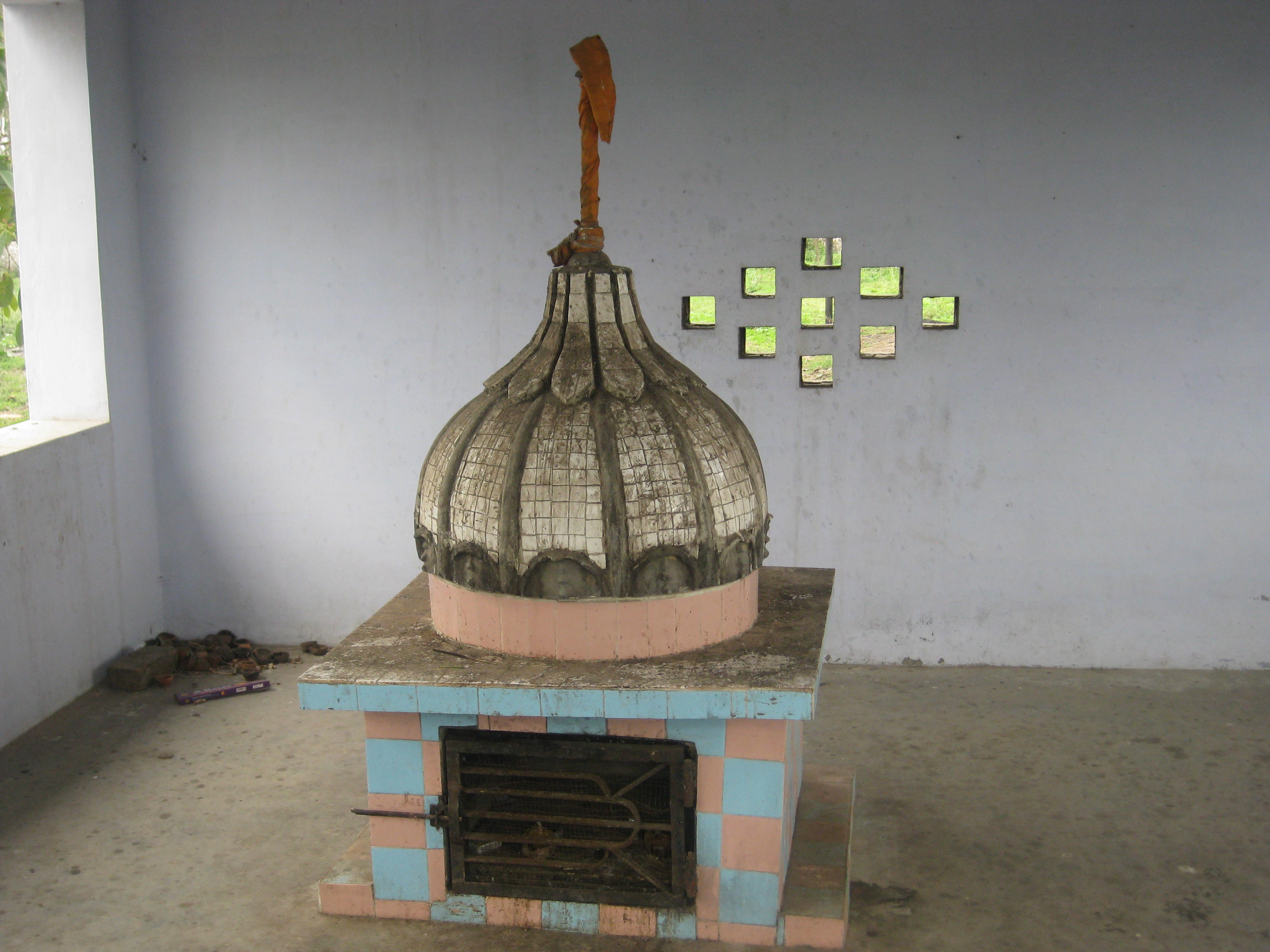
Masani Shrine in Talhan

== Conflict ==
Five years prior to the incident, Dalits approached the Jatt-dominated management board with their plee for increased representation of their community in the affairs of the shrine but were turned-away. In 1999, a court-case was launched by the Ad-Dharmis regarding the unfair elections of the management board but the ruling was inconclusive but allowed some Dalit observers to be present during annual committee elections. On 14 January 2003, the Dalit observers arrived to oversee the annual election but the Jats boycotted the entire process, pushing the election to 19 January. Still, the Jatts refused to allow the Dalits any representation in the management body and called the Punjab police, who assaulted the Dalits. Furthermore, the Jatts launched a social, economic, and resource-boycott of the Dalit community and called upon the other castes of the village to participate in the shunning of the Dalit community. In-addition, Dalits who did not own a private toilet were banned from defecating in the fields of the village. An image of Ravidas was also torn-down. Due to these actions taken by the dominant castes, the Dalits under Lahauri Ram Bali formed a Dalit Action Committee (D.A.C.) to push forward their demand, holding dharnas (protests) and sent representatives to the Scheduled Caste/Scheduled Tribes Commission to take-up the cause. The commission dispatched a team to the village on 5 February, which confirmed a social boycott was active against the Dalit inhabitants, with the local authorities taking no action to end the boycott.

The Jatts argued that they had managed the shrine and its finances well, constructing a hospital and telephone exchange with the funds, spending money on schools and roads, and some money amounting to 2.5 lakh rupees was allocated by them to the Dalit community to build a Ravidas temple. Furthermore, they stated that the Ad-Dharmis were not proper Sikhs, with most of them being listed as "Hindus", and that the shrine was associated with the Sikh religion, thus they were not eligible to manage it. Meanwhile, the Dalits refuted that the samadh was originally not a Sikh gurdwara, asserted their affinity to Sikhism, and that many of the Jatts on the management committee were clean-shaven Sikhs, in-contrast to their position against the Dalits being "not proper Sikhs".

Between 1–7 June 2003, reports arose of a dispute at Talhan village between Jat Sikhs and Chamars regarding a local gurdwara, with the local Dalits holding a protest in Jalandhar to bring attention to their plight. In the last week of June, after meetings brokered by local administrative officers, an agreement was reached between the DAC and management body, who agreed to permit two Dalits to become members of the committee if they wore turbans and became "proper Sikhs". Another term was the issuance of a public apology by the two sides and the ending of the social-boycott against the Dalits. Furthermore, the torn-down picture of Ravidas was to be restored. Merely two days after the agreement, violence between the two parties erupted at the annual mela fair at the local Mazhar of Baba Fateh Shah, sparking further events in Jalandhar. Protestors launched bandhs, burnt cars and buses, and attacked public property. Jalandhar police fired on the protesters, killing one of them, which led to an outrage that caused a curfew to be imposed in the area. The individual killed was not from Talhan but they were an Ad-Dharmi. Two weeks later, the two sides entered into negotiations again, with the same conditions as earlier being agreed upon. Thus, two Dalits were admitted into the management committee, with one undergoing the Pahul, becoming a Khalsa Sikh. However, the two Dalit members were still outnumbered by the ten Jatt members of the committee, with their power to enact change being limited by this circumstance. However, a positive change was that whenever the donation receptacle was opened, it was required to have a representative of the state administration be present to prevent pilfering. Furthermore, renovations of the structure of the shrine was carried-out to make it appear like a typical Sikh gurdwara.

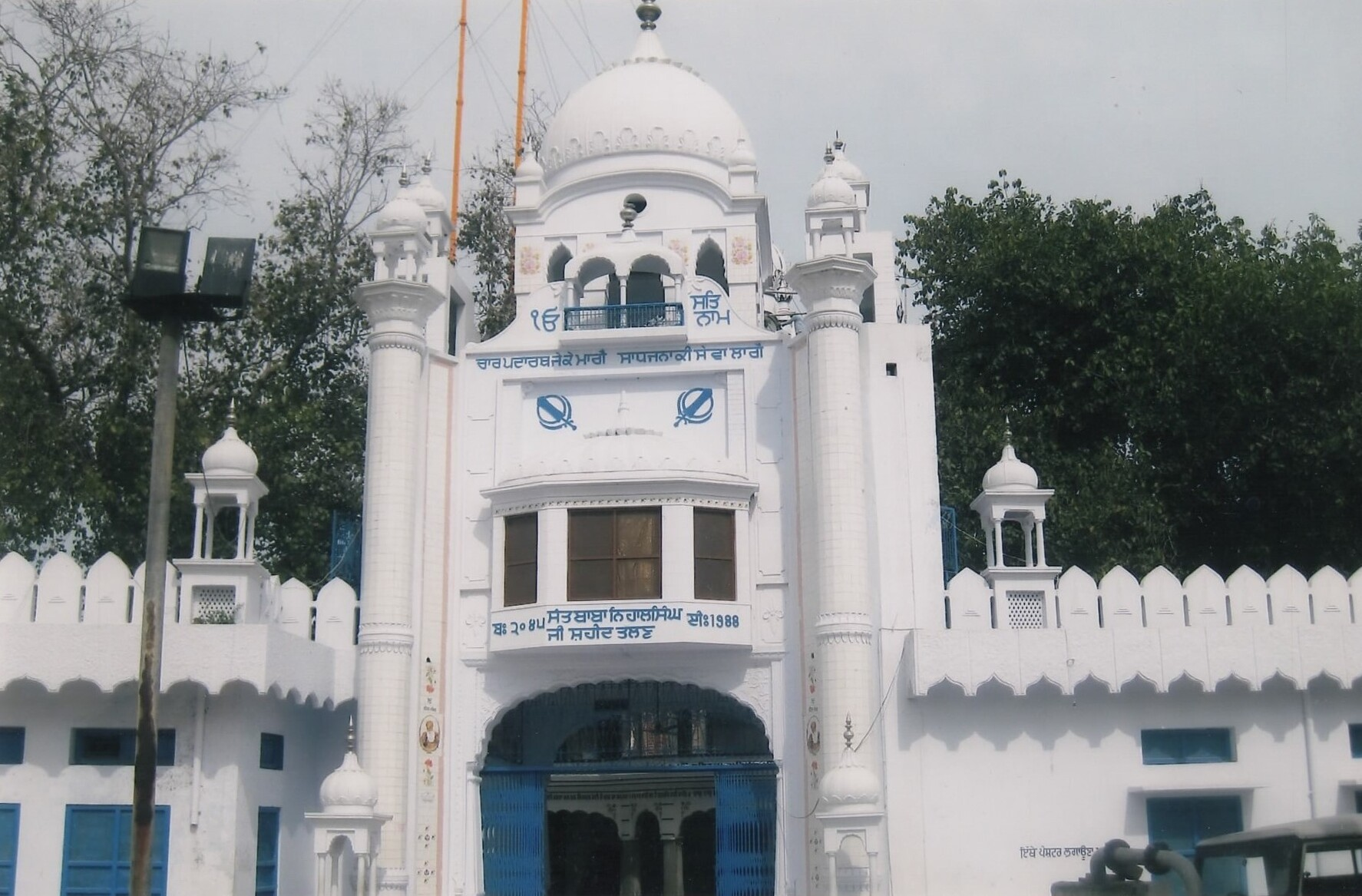
Gurdwara of Baba Nihal Singh in Talhan village

The BSP political party attempted to reframe the conflict as one between Sikhs and Hindus, namely Jatt Sikhs versus Dalit Ad-Dharmis or "Hindus". The ruling Congress Party did not interfere in the incident. The Akali Dal (Amritsar), leftist-leaders, and some Sikh organizations supported the Dalits against the social boycott.

== Aftermath ==
Eventually, both sides came to an agreement and the conflict ended. In the end, the Dalits of Talhan were successful in obtaining representation at the shrine's management committee, which emboldened other Dalit movement across the state of Punjab. It is a case-study of local Dalits challenging the domination (sardari) of the influential castes in a region. Following Talhan, similar caste-conflicts between Dalits and dominant castes arose in Bhattian Bet village of Ludhiana district, Pandori Khajoor village of Hoshiarpur district, and two villages of Sangrur district.
