= Pargat Singh =

Indian hockey player and politician (born 1965)

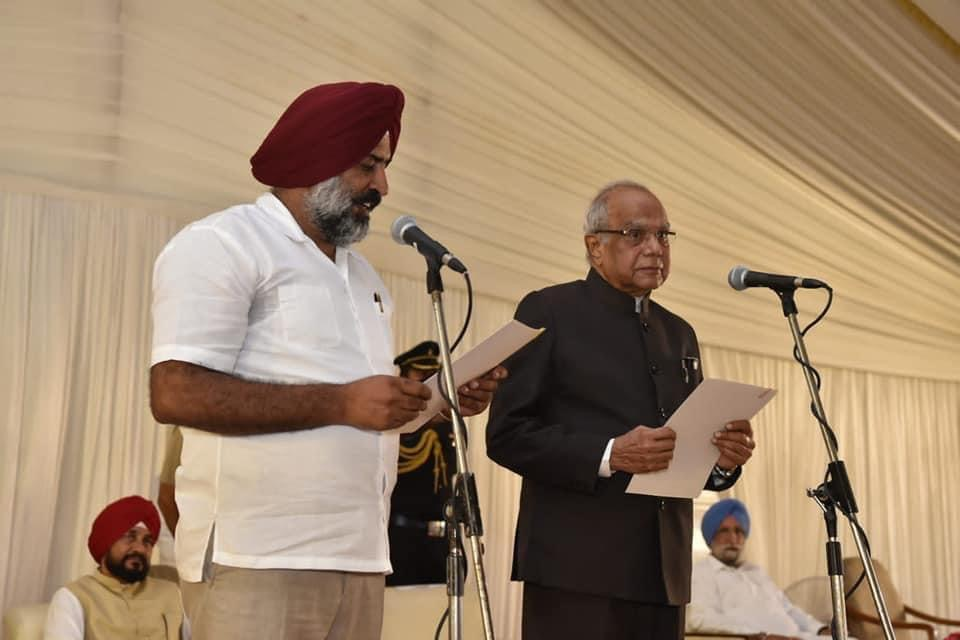
- Singh taking oath as cabinet minister

President Punjab Pradesh Congress Committee
- Incumbent
- Assumed office 2 October 2026
- Preceded by: Amrinder Singh Raja Warring

Member of the Legislative Assembly, Punjab
- Incumbent
- Assumed office 2012
- Preceded by: Jagbir Singh Brar
- Constituency: Jalandhar Cantt.

Cabinet Minister, Government of Punjab
- In office 26 September 2021 – 11 March 2022
- Governor: Banwarilal Purohit
- Chief Minister: Charanjit Singh Channi
- Departments: Sports & Youth Affairs; NRI Affairs; Higher Education; School Education
- Preceded by: Rana Gurmit Singh Sodhi (Sports, NRI Affairs) Vijay Inder Singla (School Education) Tripat Rajinder Singh Bajwa (Higher Education)

Personal details
- Born: 5 March 1965 (age 61) Mithapur, Punjab, India
- Party: Indian National Congress (2017–present)
- Other political affiliations: Awaaz-e-Punjab (2016): Shiromani Akali Dal (–2016)
- Field hockey career
- Height: 170 cm (5 ft 7 in)
- Sport: Field hockey
- Position: Defender
Senior career
Years	Team	Caps	Goals
–	Punjab Police	-	-
–	Rail Coach Factory	-	-
–	Indian Railways	-	-
National team
Years	Team	Caps	Goals
–	India		-
Medal record
Representing India
Men's field hockey
Asian Games
Bronze medal – third place	1986 Seoul	Team
Silver medal – second place	1990 Beijing	Team

Pargat Singh (born 5 March 1965) is a hockey player turned politician in India and belongs to the Indian National Congress in Punjab. He is a former Indian hockey player and his playing position was full back. He captained Indian men's hockey team at 1992 Barcelona Olympics and 1996 Atlanta Olympics. He has worked as an SP with Punjab police before taking a plunge into politics.

== Champions Trophy ==
=== 1985 (Perth) ===
India vs Germany: At one point of time score board was ticking 1–5. Pargat Singh came forward and scored 4 goals in the last 6 minutes. The result was a draw but it made Pargat Singh known.

=== 1986 (Karachi) ===
He played against Holland to give India a 3–2 victory.

== Olympics ==
He captained the Indian men's hockey team at the 1992 Barcelona Olympics and the 1996 Atlanta Olympics.

== Political career ==
In 2003, he was vice-president of the Surjit Singh Memorial Hockey Tournament Society of Jalandhar.

=== Shiromani Akali Dal ===
Singh was nominated for Jalandhar Cantonment Assembly constituency seat as SAD nominee which he subsequently won defeating Jagbir Singh Brar of Congress.

He was suspended by SAD in July 2016.

He along with Navjot Singh Sidhu and Bains brothers formed a new political front - Aawaaz-e-Punjab claiming to fight against those working against Punjab.

=== Congress ===
Singh was one of the 42 INC MLAs who submitted their resignation in protest of a decision of the Supreme Court of India ruling Punjab's termination of the Sutlej-Yamuna Link (SYL) water canal unconstitutional.

He has been a Congress MLA since 2017 from the Jalandhar Cantt constituency. He has been nominated again by Jalandhar Cantt for elections 2022. He is going to contest the Punjab assembly elections for the third time in a row. The Aam Aadmi Party gained a strong 79% majority in the sixteenth Punjab Legislative Assembly by winning 92 out of 117 seats in the 2022 Punjab Legislative Assembly election. MP Bhagwant Mann was sworn in as Chief Minister on 16 March 2022.

In 2017, he was nominated as the General Secretary of Hockey Punjab.

He has been the President of the Punjab unit of the Congress party since 2 October, 2026.

== Awards ==
S.No.	Awards	Year
1	Padma Shree	1998
2	Arjuna Award	1989

Olympic Games
Preceded by Shiny Abraham-Wilson	Flagbearer for India; Atlanta 1996	Succeeded by Leander Paes
Political offices
Preceded by	Punjab Cabinet minister for School Education; 2021–2022	Succeeded by Gurmeet Singh Meet Hayer
Preceded by	Punjab Cabinet minister for Higher Education and Languages; 2021–2022	Succeeded by Gurmeet Singh Meet Hayer
Preceded by	Punjab Cabinet minister for Sports and Youth Services; 2021–2022	Succeeded by Gurmeet Singh Meet Hayer
Preceded by	Punjab Cabinet minister for NRI Affairs; 2021–2022	Succeeded by Kuldeep Singh Dhaliwal
