= Bootan Mandi =

- Neighborhood of Jalandhar
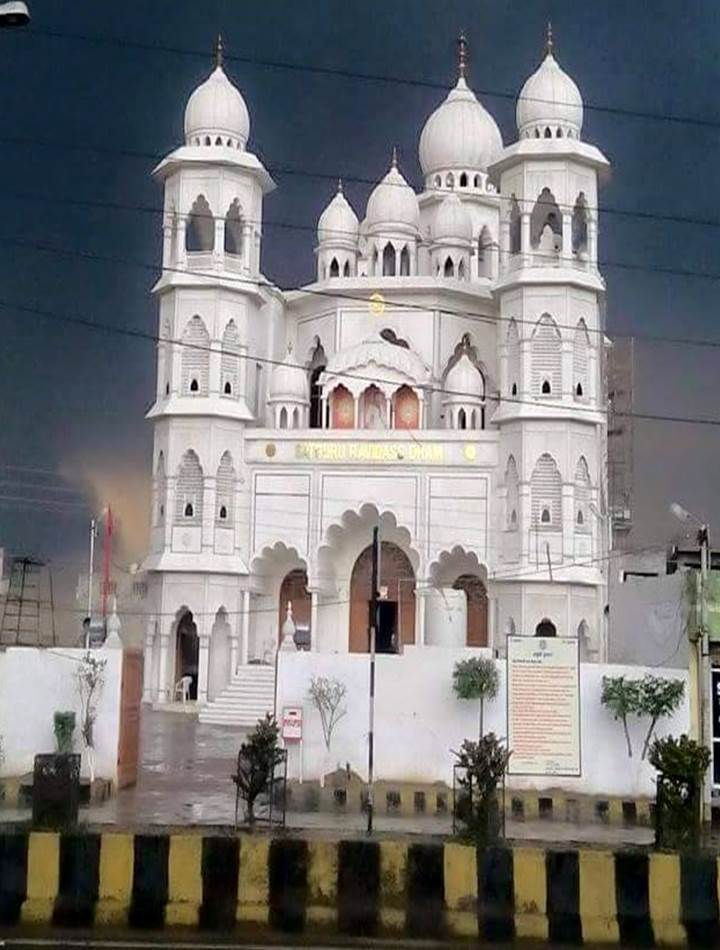
- Guru Ravidass Dham

- Location in Punjab, India Bootan Mandi (India)
- Coordinates: 31.306456°N 75.564067°E
- Country: India
- State: Punjab
- District: Jalandhar
- City: Jalandhar

Government
  - Type: Municipal corporation

Languages
  - Official: Punjabi • Hindi
- Time zone: UTC+5:30 (IST)
- PIN: 144003

Bootan Mandi is in Jalandhar City of Punjab state India. The ward number for Bootan Mandi is 54.

== Demographics ==
Bootan Mandi is located in Jalandhar City. Its neighbouring areas are New Abadi Jallowal, New Model Town, Model House, Basti Sheikh, Swami Lal Ji nagar and Malind Nagar . It is situated near the Jalandhar-Nakodar Road.

The Councillor of this area is Mr. Pawan Kumar, whose father is Mr. Sohan Lal. He is also the Councillor of 27 other areas including Bootan Mandi.

== Notable people ==
Avinash Chander MLA is from Bootan Mandi. He is a member of Punjab Legislative Assembly and represent Phillaur. He is also the Chief Parliamentary Secretary of Punjab for Higher Education & Languages department.

Bibi Nooran a folk Punjabi singer in the 70's. Bibi Nooran was a resident of Bootan Mandi. She was married to Ustad Sohan Lal. She is the Grandmother of the famous Sufi singers Nooran Sisters.

Ramesh Chander Mahey - Former ambassador to Belarus.

== Religious places ==
The Guru Ravidass Dham Bootan Mandi. It is one of the most well known Guru Ravidass Dham's in Jalandhar and even in Punjab. When it is the Birth Anniversary of Guru Ravidass, Bootan Mandi comes to life and each building illuminated with light. A big Mela is held for three days which attracts thousands of people across Jalandhar. A Jaloos (Shoba Yatra) is also held with flags, bands, dhols, tableaus, dance and music.

Some of the most well known Punjabi singers perform at Bootan Mandi on the birth anniversary of Guru Ravidass Ji. These include singers such as Hans Raj Hans who sang songs that became instant hits for Bootan Mandi such as "Sohna Punjab da shehar Jalandhar, Bootan Mandi Jisde Andar." Other singers such as the Nooran Sisters have also performed as they also have their roots in Bootan Mandi (Granddaughters of famous Bibi Nooran of Bootan Mandi). Many other legendary Famous singers have also performed such as Kanth Kaler, K.S. Makhan, Master Saleem and many others.

There is a Mosque called Masjid Umme Salmaa. It is situated opposite the Guru Ravidass Dham.

There is a Dargah called Darbar Sachi Sarkar Lakha Da which is on the Jalandhar-Nakodar Road.

There is a Buddh Vihar (Buddhist temple) in Sidharth Nagar an area in Bootan Mandi Jalandhar. It is named after Siddhartha Gautama. Buddh Purnima is celebrated every year here.

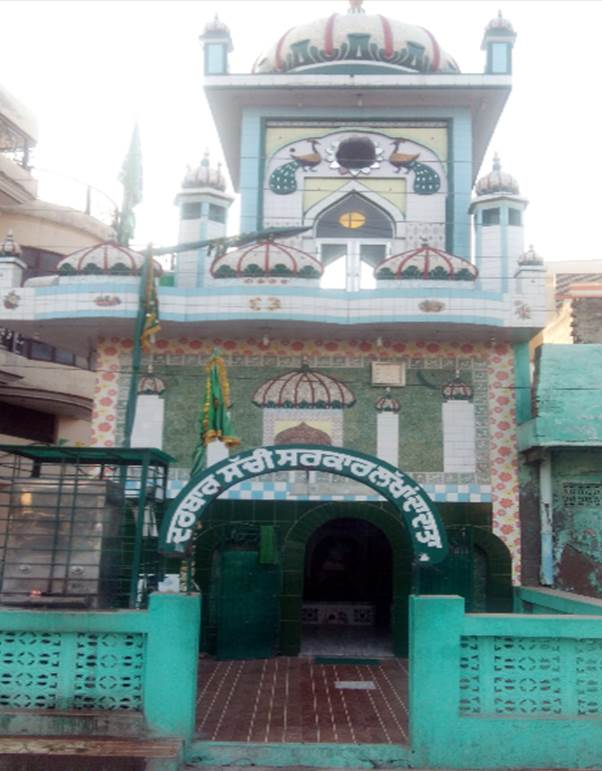
Darbar Sachi Sarkar

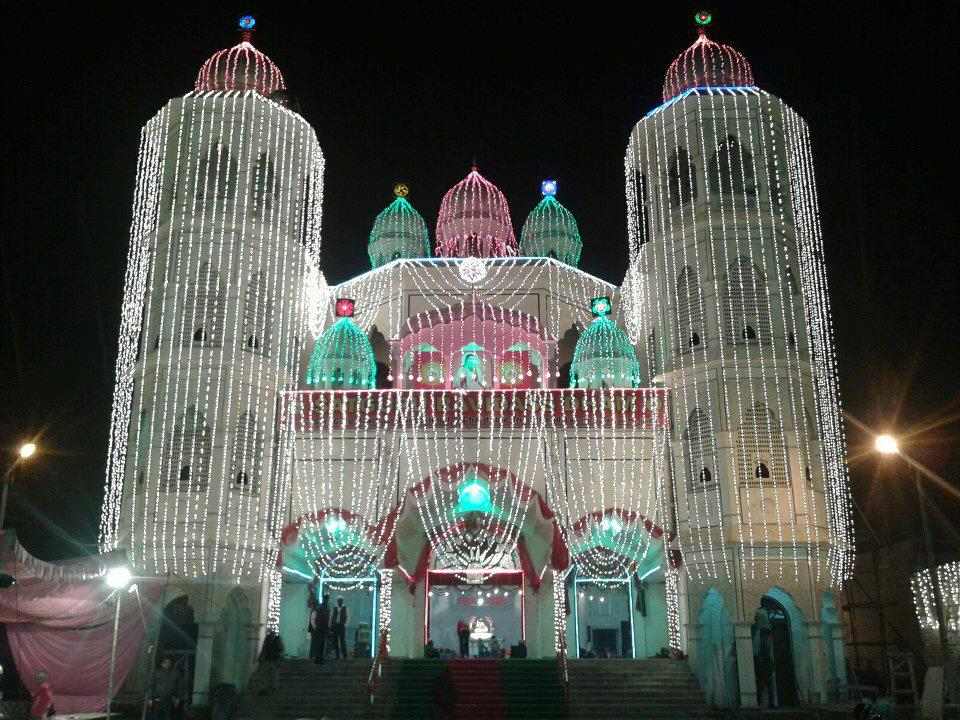
Guru Ravidass Dham

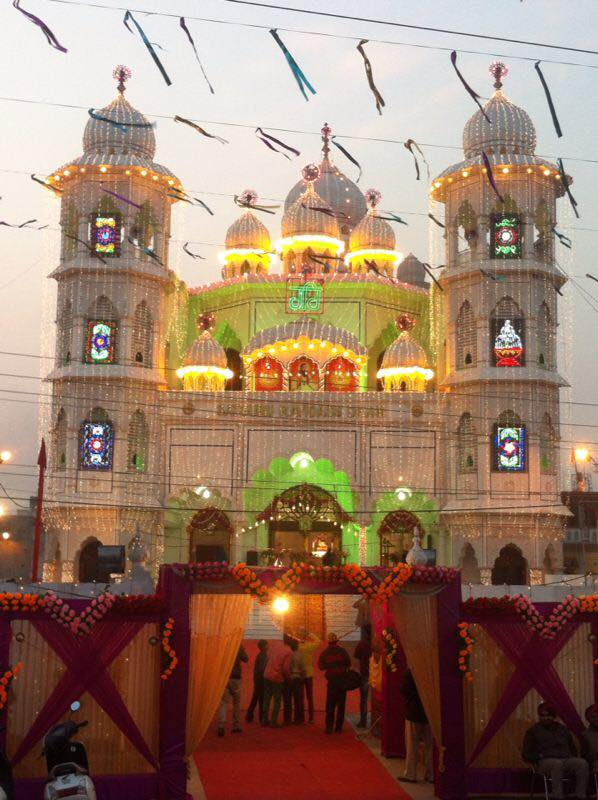
Guru Ravidass Dham

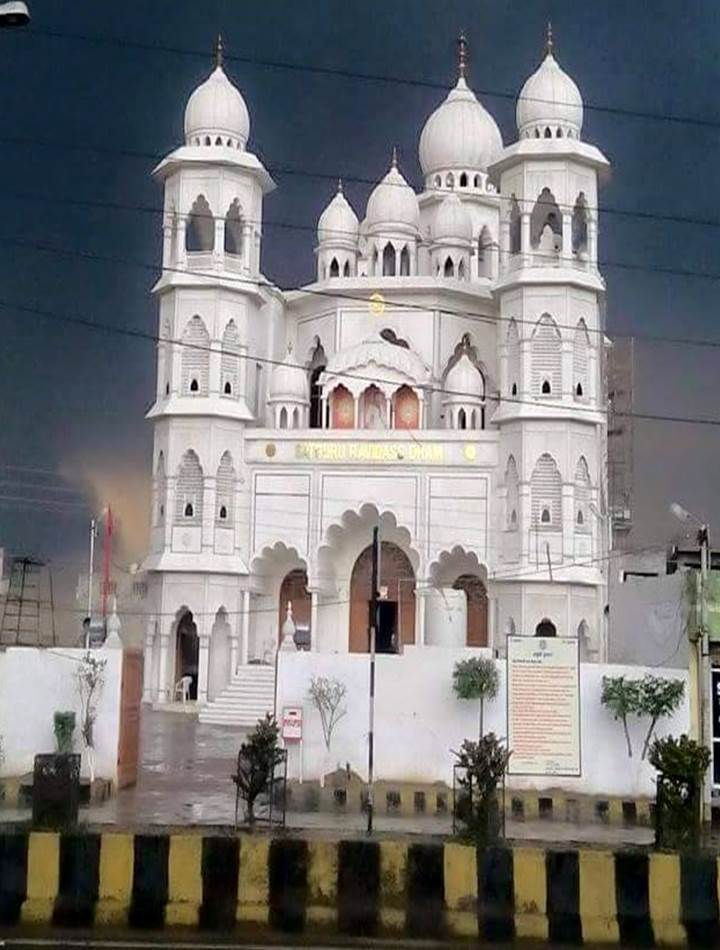
Guru Ravidass Dham

== Leather Business ==
Bootan mandi is known for its Leather Industry and is also one of the biggest Leather markets. There are number of leather products such as shoes, jackets and sports products are manufactured here.
