= Abadi Jallowal =

New Abadi Jallowal
- Neighborhood
- Location in Punjab, India New Abadi Jallowal (India)
- Coordinates: 31.305217°N 75.559214°E
- Country: India
- State: Punjab
- District: Jalandhar
- City: Jalandhar

Government
  - Type: Municipal corporation

Languages
  - Official: Punjabi • Hindi
- Time zone: UTC+5:30 (IST)

Jallowal Abadi (New Abadi Jallowal) is in the Jalandhar City in the state of Punjab. The region code that it is situated in is 144003. The ward number is 39.

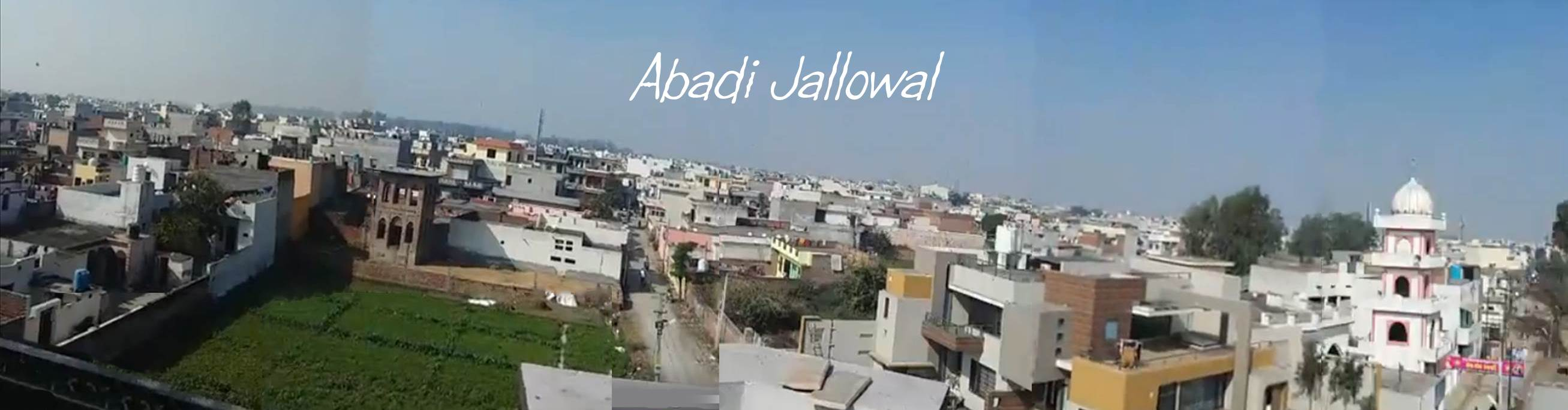

== Demographics ==
Abadi Jallowal is located in Jalandhar City. Its neighbouring areas are Bootan Mandi, Model House, Basti Sheikh, Swami Lal Ji nagar, Deol Nagar, Guru Ravi Dass Chowk, Mohalla Sharif Pura, New Surajganj, Block A Model House, Shiv Darshan Nagar, New Green Model Town, Park Road Model Town. It is approximately under 550m to Jalandhar-Nakodar Road.

The Councillor of this area is Smt. Surinder Kaur, Sr. Dy. Mayor. She is also the councillor of 10 other areas including New Abadi Jallowal. The previous councillor was Mr. Pawan Kumar which was in Ward No. 54 and he was the councillor of 27 other areas including Abadi Jallowal.

== Religious places ==
The places of worship in Jallowal Abadi are Guru Ravidass Ji Gurdwara, Darbar Baba Sunehri Sai Ji and Darbar Baba Ranga Ram Ji. It holds an annual Sobha Yatra (Julus) on the birth anniversary of Guru Ravidass Ji. An annual Salana Mela Uras (Fair) is also held for Baba Sunehri Sai Ji on the 3rd and 4th of July.

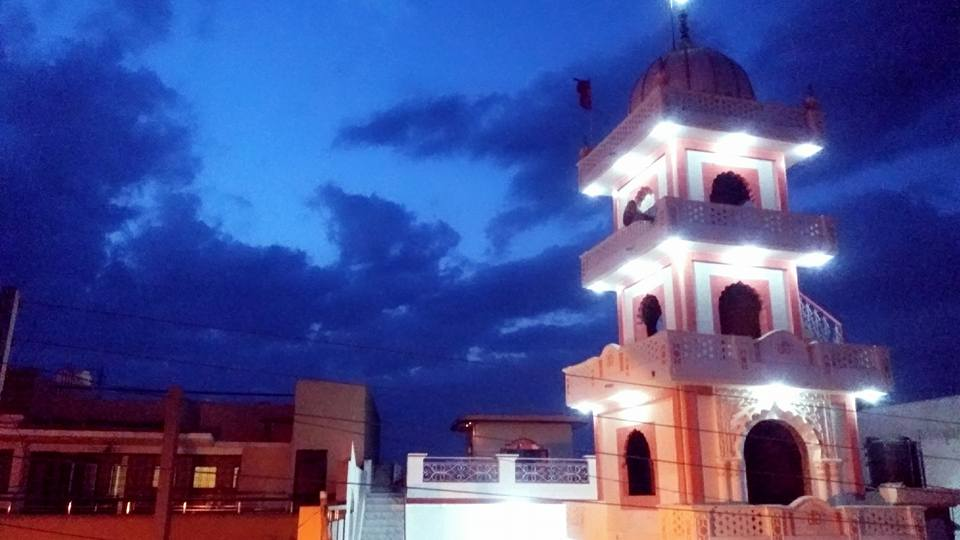
Guru Ravidass Gurdwara
