= Jagbir Singh Brar =

Indian politician

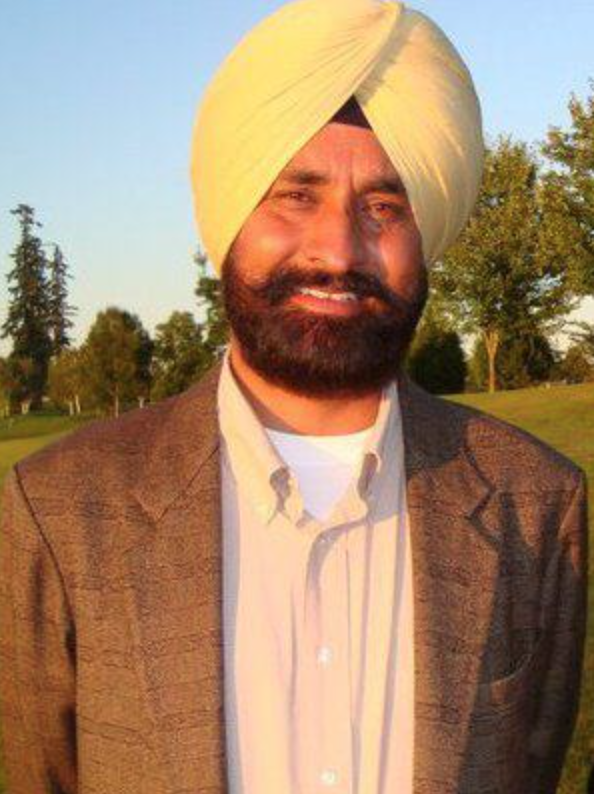

Member of the Punjab Legislative Assembly
- In office 2007–2012
- Preceded by: Gurkanwal Kaur
- Succeeded by: Pargat Singh
- Constituency: Jalandhar Cantt.

Personal details
- Born: Sri Muktsar Sahib, Punjab, India
- Party: Bharatiya Janata Party (since 2026)
- Other political affiliations: Aam Aadmi Party (2023 - 2026) *People's Party of Punjab (2011): Indian National Congress (2011 - 2021); Shiromani Akali Dal (2006 - 2011), (2021 - 2023)
- Spouse: Ravneet Kaur
- Children: 2

Jagbir Singh Brar is an Indian politician from the state of Punjab. He is a member of Bharatiya Janata Party. Brar won the 2007 Punjab Legislative Assembly elections from the Jalandhar Cantt Assembly Constituency. He is also a former President of DCC Jalandhar. Brar served as a Block development panchayat officer (BDPO) before entering politics. Brar was appointed Chairman of Punjab Water Resources Management and Development Corporation in 2019 by the Punjab Government.

== Personal life ==
Brar is originally from Sri Muktsar Sahib but currently resides in Jalandhar with his family. He did his schooling from Muktsar and then went to Patiala for higher education.

== Political career ==
Brar practiced law and later served as a BDPO before entering politics. He first contested and won the seat of Jalandhar Cantt in 2007. He is a member of Bharatiya Janata Party. He is a former DCC Jalandhar rural president. He resigned as PWRMDC Chief in 2021. He represented the Jalandhar Cantt Assembly Constituency of Punjab.
