= Jagjit Singh (politician) =

Indian politician

Chaudhary Jagjit Singh
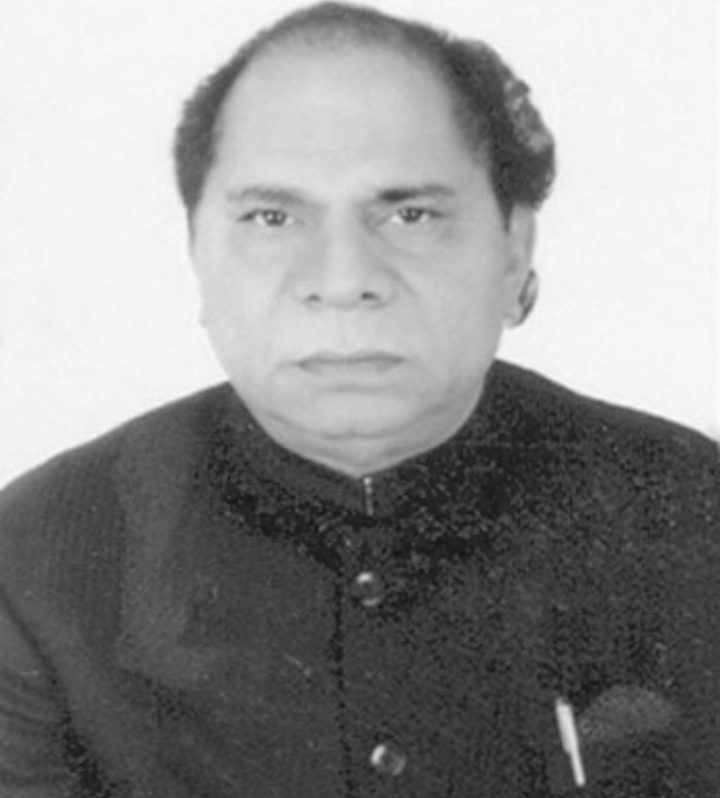

Leader of opposition in Punjab assembly
- In office 11 October 1998 – 26 February 2002
- Preceded by: Rajinder Kaur Bhattal
- Succeeded by: Prakash Singh Badal
- Constituency: Kartarpur

Member of Punjab Legislative Assembly
- In office 1980–2007
- Preceded by: Bhagat Singh
- Succeeded by: Avinash Chander
- Constituency: Kartarpur

Personal details
- Born: 26 July 1934 Jalandhar, Punjab, British India (now in Punjab, India)
- Died: 4 August 2015 (aged 81) Jalandhar, Punjab, India
- Party: Indian National Congress
- Spouse: Gurbachan Kaur
- Children: Chaudhary Surinder Singh

Chaudhary Jagjit Singh was an Indian politician and member of Punjab Legislative Assembly.

== Early life ==
Chaudhary Jagjit Singh was born in the Ravidassia family of Master Gurbanta Singh and Sampuran Kaur at Dhaliwal, Jalandhar, Punjab.

After the death of his father, he became his official political heir. Jagjit's younger brother, Santokh Singh Chaudhary is also a political leader, and his son Chaudhary Surinder Singh is an MLA from Kartarpur.

== Politics ==
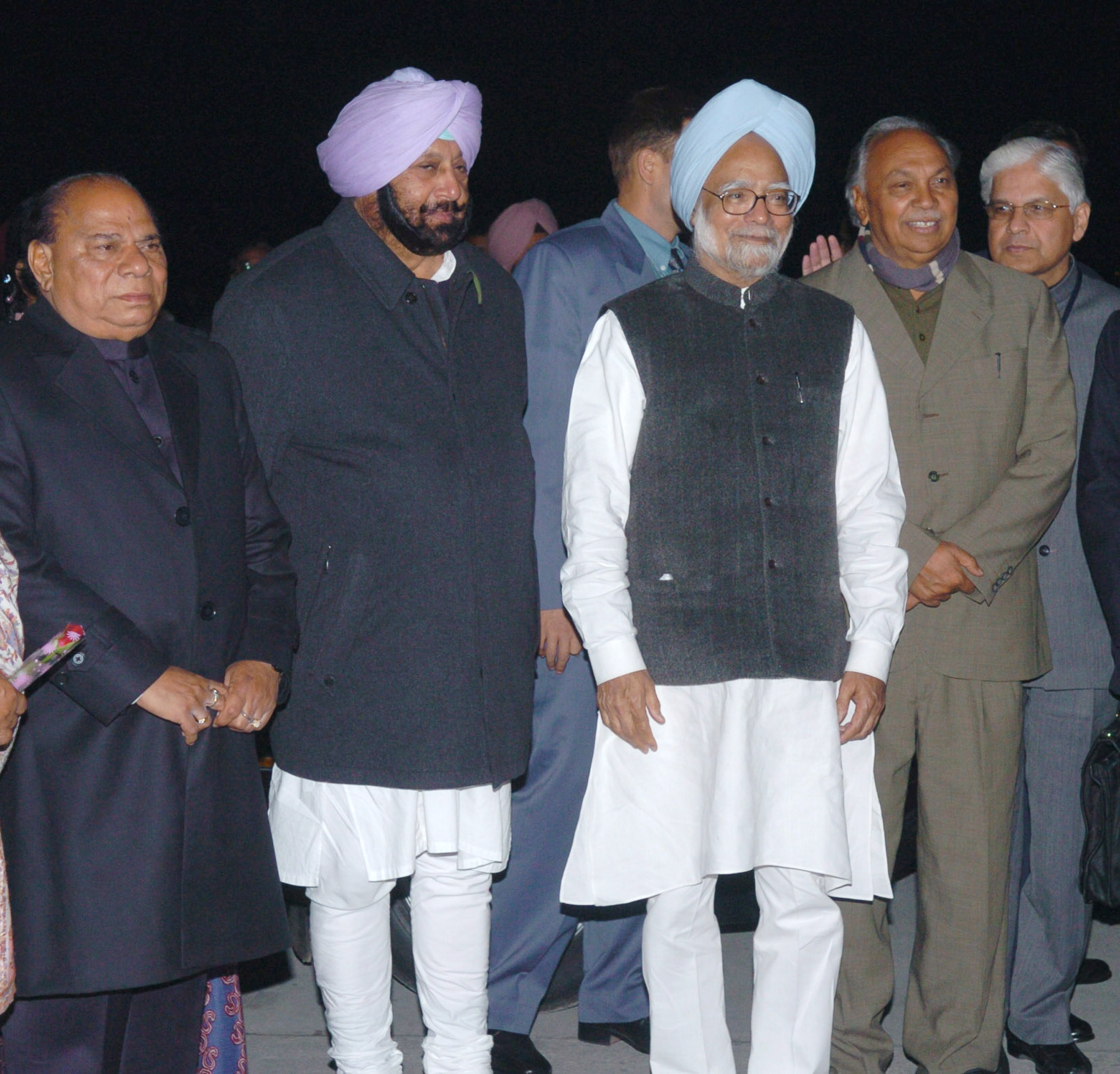
Jagjit Singh (left) with Chief Minister of Punjab (center) and Prime Minister of India, 2006 (right).

He started his political career as a Sarpanch of their ancestral village 'Dhariwal Kadian'. He was then appointed Chairman of Jalandhar Zila Parshad. He also served as Chairman of Block Samiti, managing director of Cooperative Bank, and Chairman of Market Committee.

He continued to serve as both the Cabinet Minister of Punjab for Labour and Employment and the Minister of State for Housing and Urban Development. He won the Punjab Assembly election five times continuously from Kartarpur Assembly Constituency in 1980, 1985, 1992, 1997, and 2002.

In 1998, he was appointed the leader of the opposition in the Punjab Legislative Assembly and also served as the vice-president of Punjab Congress Committee.

He was implicated in the "Ludhiana City Centre scam", in which he and others allegedly caused monetary loss to the state by awarding the contract for a large project in Ludhiana to a New Delhi-based construction company.

He died on 4 August 2015 due to a heart attack.
