= Phillaur Assembly constituency =

Legislative Assembly constituency in Punjab State, India

Coordinates: 31.22°N 75.77°E

Phillaur
- Constituency No. 30 for the Punjab Legislative Assembly

Constituency details
- Country: India
- State: Punjab
- District: Jalandhar
- Lok Sabha constituency: Jalandhar
- Established: 1951
- Total electors: 207,149
- Reservation: SC

Member of Legislative Assembly
- 16th Punjab Legislative Assembly
- Incumbent Vikramjit Singh Chaudhary
- Party: Independent
- Elected year: 2022

Phillaur is one of the 117 Legislative Assembly constituencies of Punjab state in India. It is part of Jalandhar district and is reserved for candidates belonging to the Scheduled Castes.

== Members of the Legislative Assembly ==
Most successful parties from Phillaur Vidhan Sabha
1. INC (8 Times) (50.0%)
2. SAD (7 Times) (43.8%)
3. IND (1 Time) (6.25%)

| Year | Member | Party |
|---|---|---|
| 1952 | Niranjan Dass | Indian National Congress |
| 1957 | Udham Singh | Indian National Congress |
| 1962 | Hari Singh | Independent |
| 1967 | A. Singh | Indian National Congress |
| 1969 | Surjit Singh Atwal | Indian National Congress |
| 1972 | Surjit Singh Atwal | Indian National Congress |
| 1977 | Sarwan Singh Phillaur | Shiromani Akali Dal |
| 1980 | Sarwan Singh Phillaur | Shiromani Akali Dal |
| 1985 | Sarwan Singh Phillaur | Shiromani Akali Dal |
| 1992 | Santokh Singh Choudhary | Indian National Congress |
| 1997 | Sarwan Singh Phillaur | Shiromani Akali Dal |
| 2002 | Santokh Singh Choudhary | Indian National Congress |
| 2007 | Sarwan Singh Phillaur | Shiromani Akali Dal |
| 2012 | Avinash Chander | Shiromani Akali Dal |
| 2017 | Baldev Singh Khaira | Shiromani Akali Dal |
| 2022 | Vikramjit Singh Chaudhary | Indian National Congress |

== Election results ==
=== 2027 ===
Punjab Assembly election, 2027: Phillaur
| Party | Candidate | Votes | % | ±% |
|---|---|---|---|---|
| AAP | Harjot Kaur Lohtia | | | |
| AD (WPD) | | | | New entry |
| INC | | | | |
| BSP | | | | |
| SAD | | | | |
| BJP | | | | New entry |
| NOTA | None of the above | | | |
| Majority | | | | |
| Turnout | | | | |

=== 2022 ===
Punjab Assembly election, 2022: Phillaur
| Party | Candidate | Votes | % | ±% |
|---|---|---|---|---|
| INC | Vikramjit Singh Chaudhary | 48,288 | 34.80 | ▲9.0 |
| SAD | Baldev Singh Khaira | 35,985 | 25.90 | ▼2.2 |
| AAP | Prem Kumar | 34,478 | 24.80 | ▲0.5 |
| Independent | Advocate Ajay Kumar Phillaur | 7,096 | 5.1 | |
| SAD(A) | Surjit Singh | 4,358 | 3.1 | |
| SAD(S) | Damanvir Singh Phillaur | 4,104 | 3.0 | |
| NOTA | None of the above | 920 | 0.4 | |
| Majority | | 12,303 | 8.8 | |
| Turnout | | 139,886 | 67.50 | |
| Registered electors | | 207,222 | | |

=== 2017 ===
Punjab Assembly election, 2017: Phillaur
| Party | Candidate | Votes | % | ±% |
|---|---|---|---|---|
| SAD | Baldev Singh Khaira | 41,336 | 28.10 | |
| INC | Vikramjit Singh Chaudhary | 37,859 | 25.80 | |
| AAP | Saroop Singh Kadiana | 35,779 | 24.30 | |
| BSP | Avtar Singh Karimpuri | 28,035 | 19.10 | |
| NOTA | None of the above | 953 | 0.65 | |
| Majority | | 3,477 | 2.40 | |
| Turnout | | 146,031 | 75.80 | |
| Registered electors | | 193,958 | | |

=== 2012 ===
Punjab Assembly election, 2012: Phillaur
| Party | Candidate | Votes | % | ±% |
|---|---|---|---|---|
| SAD | Avinash Chander | 46,115 | 32.5 | |
| INC | Santokh Singh Chaudhary | 46,084 | 32.5 | |
| BSP | Baldev Singh | 42,328 | 29.9 | |
| Majority | | 31 | 0.0 | |
| Turnout | | 141,524 | 78.5 | |
| Registered electors | | 180,280 | | |

== See also ==
- List of constituencies of the Punjab Legislative Assembly
- Jalandhar district
