= Swarn Noora =

Indian Sufi singer

- Genres: Sufi music
- Occupation: Musician
- Instrument: Vocalist

Swarn Noora is a Sufi singer from Amritsar, Punjab, India. She has performed at major festivals in India. She also became a resident of Bootan Mandi in Jalandhar. She is the grandmother of the famous Sufi singers of Punjab, Nooran Sisters.

== Early life ==
Swarn Noora was born to acclaimed Sufi singer, Bibi Noora. Her family hailed from Lyalpur (now Faisalabad) in present-day Pakistan.

== Career ==
Her family belonged to Lyalpur in present-day Pakistan but they moved to India at the time of partition and Swarn Noora was born close to Amritsar. She is a nationally acclaimed singer of the Sufiyana kalam, though she regards her late husband Sohan Lal to be her real Ustaad (Teacher). She was interested in singing even as a little girl, but her mother did not consider it a fit line for her daughter and didn't encourage her to train professionally. She was married at the age of twenty one and though her husband also belonged to a family of singers who regularly did professional programs, mostly of Qawwali, she would never go with them. She says that she fell seriously ill with an inexplicable illness and it is then that her husband, having tried all kinds of medicines and failed, asked her what she really was sad about. She then expressed her desire to sing professionally. He immediately agreed and began to train her to sing with a dholak and a tabla, to equip her to perform in front of audiences. That was the beginning of her journey into professional singing and she hasn't looked back since. Her husband died a few years after, she then sang with her son, Dilbahar, who accompanied her in vocals and on the harmonium. Her eldest son, Gulshan, is a composer and has set many of the compositions she sang to tune and the second son, Gulzar, is a dholak player.

Her first album was released by beatofindia.com, a folk music promotion group. Her vocals for this album led to many producers around the world using Nooran's voice sample in their songs.

She is based in Jalandar, India.
