= All India Law Students' Association =

All India Law Students Association अखिल भारतीय विधि छात्र संघ
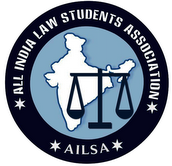
- Abbreviation: AILSA
- Formation: 16 August 2008
- Type: Student organisation
- Purpose: To contribute to legal education and foster mutual understanding and to promote social responsibility among law students and young lawyers; also providing legal aid to the needy
- Headquarters: New Delhi
- Location: DS-423/424, New Rajinder Nagar, New Delhi
- Region served: India
- President: Deepshikha Goyal
- Main organ: Executive Council of AILSA
- Parent organisation: All India Bar Association
- Website: http://www.lawstudents.org.in
- Remarks: AILSA is the India's largest independent, non-political and non-profit making law students association

All India Law Students Association (AILSA or अखिल भारतीय विधि छात्र संघ) is a non-profit association of students and lawyers who are dedicated to the promotion of welfare of law students all over India. AILSA provides students with opportunities to interact with legal professionals in an international arena. The organisation's activities include academic conferences, publications, the global coordination of student organisations, seminars, providing free legal aid. etc. In the past the association has organised a National Legal Essay Competition under the leadership of Mr. Manas Dowlani.

== Presidents ==
Presidents of the Association are selected by the AILSA Executive Council. Recently, the Executive Council passed a unanimous resolution selecting Ms. Deepishika Goyal as the President.

Past Presidents
Year	Name	University
2008–2009	Neha Gupta	Bhartiya Vidyapeeth University (Pune)
2009–2011	Suresh Sharma	Faculty of Law, Jamia Millia Islamia (New Delhi)
2011–2012	Siddharth Nayak	NALSAR University of Law
2012–2014	Manas Dowlani	Government Law College (Mumbai)
2014-2015	Apoorv Agarwal	NUJS (Kolkata)
2015-2016	Nachiketa Vajpayee	Rajiv Gandhi National University of Law (Patiala)
2016-2017	Deepshikha Goyal	Campus Law Centre, Delhi University
2017-2018	Ketul Hansraj*	Amity School of Law, IP University

[*Incumbent]

== Patron ==
Dr. Adish Aggarwala, President, International Council of Jurists; Chairman, All India Bar Association; Special Counsel, Government of India; Ex. Vice - Chairman, Bar Council of India is the patron of the organisation. Mr. Suresh Sharma, Lawyer & former legal consultant to ministry of Home Affairs and former President of All India Law Students' Association was nominated as permanent Advisor to the Association.
