= Swarn Singh Kalsi =

Indian engineer

Swarn Singh Kalsi from the Kalsi Green Power Systems, LLC, Princeton, NJ was named Fellow of the Institute of Electrical and Electronics Engineers (IEEE) in 2013 for development and application of high temperature superconductor electric power equipment.
