= Kuljit Singh Nagra =

Indian politician

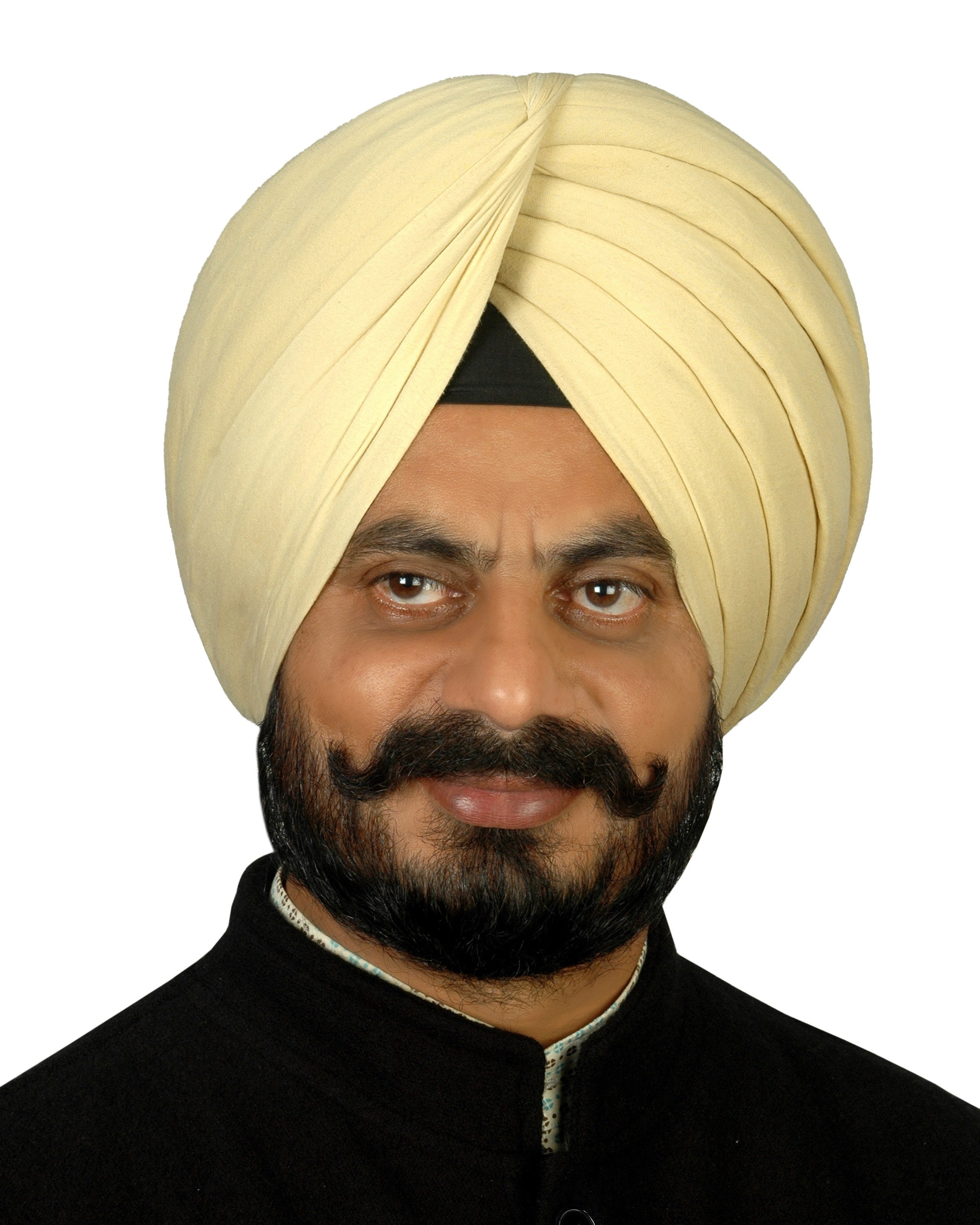
MLA Kuljit Singh Nagra

Kuljit Singh Nagra(born August 31, 1965) is an Indian politician. He was Member of the Legislative Assembly (MLA) for Fatehgarh Sahib until 2022, representing the Indian National Congress. As a professional, he is an advocate in the Punjab and Haryana High Court, and a member of the Punjab High Court and Haryana Bar Association Chandigarh.

== Student politics ==
Nagra became active in politics while at college. He was the president of Khalsa College Students Union, Chandigarh, from 1985 to 1986, and Panjab University Campus Students Council, Chandigarh, from 1989 to 1995. He organized cultural activities such as the All India Inter-University Youth Festival "Jhankar" in 1987–88, 1989–90 and 1991–92 at Panjab University.

He was convener for the Panjab University Students Consultative Committee (PUSCC) from 1989 to 1992 and also chair of the Northern University Student Coordination Committee from 1991 to 1992. He was convener for the Students Association of North Zone Universities from 1992 to 1994, organising the North Zone Inter-University Youth Festival on behalf of the Association of Indian Universities (AIU) in 1992–93 at Panjab University, Chandigarh. He was elected as a President for Panjab University Students Council of Session 1992–93.

He held the position of chairman in Panjab University Students Union (PUSU) from 1995 to 1998. He was also the founding president of the All India Law Students' Association.

He was a Zonal in charge of the Indian Youth Congress (IYC) to oversee and coordinate the election work in the 2002 Punjab Legislative Assembly Election.

== Political career ==
Nagra was the MLA from Fatehgarh Sahib, Punjab, until 2022. He has also held the post of President of the Kisan and Khet Mazdoor Congress in Punjab, and was in charge of programmes at the National Students' Union of India. He is elected member of the PCC from Block Khera of Fatehgarh Sahib Assembly constituency. Previously he was General Secretary of Indian Youth Congress (IYC) and elected Punjab Pradesh Congress Committee (PPCC) Member from 2007 to 2010. He graduated from Panjab University (1996 -2000), where he was elected as a Senate Member of the constituency. He was a General Secretary of Punjab Youth Congress from 1995 to 1997. Also, he served as an In-charge of the Harchandpur Assembly of Rae Bareli parliamentary constituency from where Smt. Sonia Gandhi Ji contested elections.
