= Tej Parkash Singh =

Indian politician

Member Punjab Legislative Assembly
- In office 2007–2012

Member Punjab Legislative Assembly
- In office 2002–2007

Personal details
- Party: Indian National Congress
- Parent: Beant Singh (father)
- Occupation: Politician

Tej Parkash Singh is an Indian Politician from the state of Punjab.

== Constituency ==
Singh represented the Payal, Ludhiana constituency from 2002 to 2007 and from 2007 to 2012.

== Posts ==
Singh was the transport Minister in the Government of Punjab.

== Political party ==
Singh is from the Indian National Congress.

== Family ==
Singh's father Beant Singh was the Chief Minister of Punjab from 1992 to 1995.
