= Beant Singh (politician) =

Chief Minister of Punjab, India from 1992 to 1995

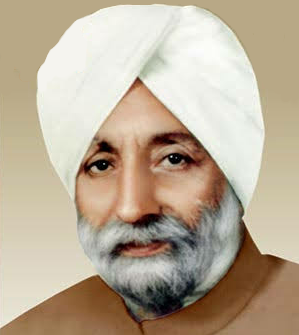

12th Chief Minister of Punjab
- In office 25 February 1992 – 31 August 1995
- Preceded by: President's rule
- Succeeded by: Harcharan Singh Brar

Personal details
- Born: 19 February 1922 Patiala, Punjab, British India
- Died: 31 August 1995 (aged 73) Chandigarh, India
- Cause of death: Assassination
- Party: Indian National Congress
- Spouse: Jaswant Kaur
- Children: Tej Parkash Singh; Gurkanwal Kaur
- Education: Government College University, Lahore

Beant Singh (19 February 1922 – 31 August 1995) was an Indian politician and the 12th Chief Minister of Punjab from 1992 until his assassination by suicide bombing. He was a member of Indian National Congress.

== Early life ==
Beant was born in Jhajj Jat Sikh Family from Bilaspur village near Doraha in Ludhiana District. The family migrated to Canal colonies of the West Punjab but shifted to village Kotli (Kotla Afghana) near Payal in the Ludhiana district after partition. He completed his education from the Government College Lahore. At the age of 23, he joined the army but after two years of service, decided to make a switch to politics and social work.

== Political career ==
After the 1947 partition, Beant Singh entered Punjab politics. In 1960 he was elected chairman of block samiti (committee) of Doraha, in Ludhiana district. After serving for some time as Director of the Central cooperative bank in Ludhiana, Beant Singh entered the Punjab Vidhan Sabha (assembly) as an independent candidate in 1969.

== Death ==
Beant Singh was killed in a bomb blast at the secretariat complex in Chandigarh on 31 August 1995. The blast claimed the lives of 17 others including 3 Indian commandos. Beant Singh was accompanied by his close friend Ranjodh Singh Mann on the day of assassination. Dilawar Singh Babbar of Babbar Khalsa International acted as the suicide bomber; later, the backup bomber Balwant Singh Rajoana was also convicted of the killing. According to the Department of State the Khalistan Commando Force was also involved in the assassination.

In 2012, a Chandigarh court sentenced Rajoana to death. A number of Sikhs protested against the decision, and campaigned to stop the execution of Balwant Singh Rajoana. On 28 March 2012 the Government Of India stayed the execution of Rajoana after Punjab Chief Minister Parkash Singh Badal met President Pratibha Patil seeking clemency for him.

On 7 January 2015, Jagtar Singh Tara who is alleged to be one of the masterminds in assassination of Singh was arrested by Thai Police in Bangkok after a request by the Indian investigative agency (Central Bureau of Investigation). Tara is currently undergoing a trial in an Indian prison.

== Personal life ==
=== Religion ===
Since his village was sandwiched between two major Namdhari sites of Malerkotla and Bhaini Sahib; he became a follower of the Namdhari tradition and received blessings from the Namdhari Satguru Pratap Singh, which is why he always wore a White coloured turban, and also because it was the Indian National Congress' party colour. He had full faith in the Namdhari belief system and worked with Surinder Singh Namdhari during his tenure to help in the affairs of the sect when necessary. Like Namdharis he did not eat meat or drink alcohol. In 1993 a businessman wanted to start a large meat processing plant in Lalru, which would have given thousands of Punjabis jobs- though after Namdharis objected Beant Singh withheld permission. He donated 500 acres of Government land in Punjab to Namdharis in Amritsar, Ludhiana and Malerkotla.

=== Family ===
His son Tej Parkash Singh was minister in the Punjab government led by Harcharan Singh Brar who succeeded him. His daughter Gurkanwal Kaur is a former minister of state for social welfare and Parliamentary secretary in the Amarinder Singh government. His grandson Ravneet Singh was an MP from Anandpur Sahib for 5 years and later from Ludhiana for 10 years, he is currently a Minister of State for Railway and Food Processing Industries in the Third Modi Ministry. Another grandson, Gurkirat Singh Kotli, was given a ticket for becoming an MLA from Khanna where he won. Another grandson Guriqbal Singh was the DSP Punjab Police. His wife died in 2010.

== Bibliography ==
- (1995). "Beant Singh." The Times. 4 September.
- Burns, John (1995). "New Violence in India." The New York Times. 1 September.
- Dahlberg, John-Thor (1995). "Punjabi Minister Killed by Car Bomb in India." Los Angeles Times. 1 September.
- Tully, Mark (1995). "Beant Singh; Claws of the Lion." The Guardian. 4 September.

== See also ==
- List of Indian chief ministers who died in office
