= Santokh Singh Chaudhary =

Indian politician (1946–2023)

- ਸੰਤੋਖ ਸਿੰਘ ਚੌਧਰੀ
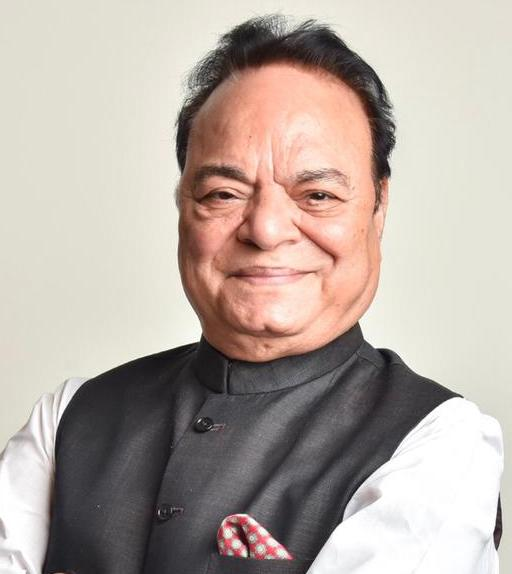
- Chaudhary in 2021

Member of Parliament, Lok Sabha
- In office 16 May 2014 – 14 January 2023
- Preceded by: Mohinder Singh Kaypee
- Succeeded by: Sushil Kumar Rinku
- Constituency: Jalandhar

Personal details
- Born: 18 June 1946 Dhaliwal, Punjab, British India
- Died: 14 January 2023 (aged 76) Phillaur, Punjab, India
- Party: Indian National Congress
- Spouse: Smt. Karamjit Kaur
- Children: 1
- Occupation: Advocate
- As of 15 December, 2016

Santokh Singh Chaudhary (18 June 1946 – 14 January 2023) was an Indian politician and advocate who was a Cabinet Minister of Punjab and a member of parliament from Jalandhar (Lok Sabha constituency) from 2014 to 2023.

== Biography ==
=== Early life ===
Chaudhary Santokh Singh was born in Dhaliwal village, Jalandhar, into a prominent political family from the Doaba region of Punjab. His father, Master Gurbanta Singh, was a notable political leader who was elected to the Legislative Assembly of British India, Punjab and served as Parliamentary Secretary in the Ministry of Malik Khizar Hayat Tiwana (Premier of Punjab). Growing up in such a politically active family, Santokh Singh was exposed early to public service and governance, which influenced his future career in politics.

=== Personal life ===
He was married to Karamjit Kaur, who served as the Director of Public Instruction (Colleges) in Punjab. His wife also contested an unsuccessful bye-election from the Jalandhar Constituency for Lok Sabha after his demise. His son Vikramjit Singh Chaudhary is also a Member of the Legislative Assembly and represents the Phillaur constituency.

== Political career ==
=== Punjab Legislative Assembly ===
He elected as a Member of the Punjab Legislative Assembly for three terms between 1992 and 2012. During his tenure in the Punjab Legislative Assembly he held several ministerial responsibilities. He served as Cabinet Minister for Rural Development & Panchayats, Parliamentary Affairs, and Power in the Punjab government.

=== Member of Parliament (Lok Sabha) ===
He represented the Jalandhar constituency from 2014 until his passing in 2023. He also served on various parliamentary committees, including the Consultative Committee for the Ministry of Urban Development, Housing and Urban Poverty Alleviation, and the Standing Committee on Social Justice and Empowerment during his tenure as Member of Parliament.

== Demise ==
He died on 14 January 2023 at the age of 76. He suffered a cardiac arrest while walking alongside Rahul Gandhi during the Bharat Jodo Yatra in the Phillaur area of Punjab. Despite being rushed to a hospital in Phagwara, he was declared brought dead. His death came as a shock to Punjab politics, particularly in the Doaba region, where he had a strong base and was regarded as one of the most prominent Dalit leaders of the Congress party.

On 15 January 2023, he was cremated in his native village Dhaliwal, Jalandhar, with full state honours. His son, Vikramjit Singh Chaudhary (MLA from Phillaur), performed the last rites. National leaders, including Prime Minister Narendra Modi, Congress President Mallikarjun Kharge, and Rahul Gandhi, expressed deep grief, acknowledging his long service to public life and his dedication to social justice and Dalit upliftment.

Lok Sabha
Preceded by Mohinder Singh Kaypee	Member of Parliament for Jalandhar; 2014–2023	Succeeded by Sushil Kumar Rinku
