= Avinash Chander =

Indian politician

MLA, Punjab
- In office 2007 - 2012
- Preceded by: Chaudhry Jagjit Singh
- Succeeded by: Avinash chander
- Constituency: Kartarpur
- In office 2012 - 2017
- Preceded by: Santokh singh chaudhary
- Succeeded by: Avinash chander
- Constituency: Phillaur

Personal details
- Born: 12th JUNE,1964 Jalandhar
- Party: Bharatiya Janata Party
- Other party: Shiromani Akali Dal

Avinash Chander is an Indian politician and belongs to Bharatiya Janata Party. He was the member of Punjab Legislative Assembly and represented Kartarpur (2007-2012) and Phillaur ( 2012-2017) from Shiromani Akali Dal. He was also the chief parliamentary secretary for Higher Education & Languages department. In 2022, he joined BJP and now he is the member of core committee Punjab.

== Family ==
His father's name is Mool Raj. His grandfather's name is Seth Kishan Dass.

== Political career ==
Avinash Chander was first elected to Punjab Legislative Assembly from Kartarpur in 2007 by defeating Chaudhary Jagjit singh. In 2012, he successfully contested from the new constituency Phillaur and defeated Santokh singh chaudhary. In 2022, he joined BJP and now he is the member of the core committee Punjab.
