= Dhaliwal, Nakodar =

Dhaliwal
- village
- Location in Punjab, India Dhaliwal (India)
- Coordinates: 31.168431°N 75.593323°E
- Country: India
- State: Punjab
- District: Jalandhar
- Talukas: Nakodar

Languages
  - Official: Punjabi
  - Regional: Punjabi
- Time zone: UTC+5:30 (IST)
- PIN: 144033
- Telephone code: 0181
- Vehicle registration: PB- 08
- Nearest city: Nakodar

Dhaliwal is a small village in Nakodar. Nakodar is a tehsil in the city Jalandhar of Indian state of Punjab.

== STD code ==
Dhaliwal's STD code is 01821 and post code is 144033.
