= Dhingra =

Dhingra is a family name of Arora Hindus and Sikhs. It is derived from a clan of Jats.

== Notable people ==
Notable people with the surname, who may or may not be affiliated with the clans or religions, include:

- Gaurav Dhingra (born 1980), Indian film and television producer
- Gurbachan Singh Dhingra (born 1950), Indian entrepreneur
- Kuldip Singh Dhingra (born 1947), Indian entrepreneur
- Leena Dhingra, British writer, actress and teacher
- Madan Lal Dhingra (1883–1909), Indian revolutionary
- Manka Dhingra (born 1973/74), India-American attorney and politician
- Pooja Dhingra (born 1986), Indian pastry chef and businesswoman
- Rachna Dhingra (born 1977), Indian social activist
- Ravi Kumar Dhingra (born 1970), Indian admiral
- Sangita Dhingra Sehgal (born 1958), Indian jurist
- Swati Dhingra (born 1980), Indian-British economist and professor
