= Patiala Lok Sabha constituency =

Lok Sabha constituency in Punjab

Coordinates: 30.3°N 76.4°E

Patiala PB-13
- Lok Sabha constituency

Constituency details
- Country: India
- State: Punjab
- Assembly constituencies: Nabha; Patiala Rural; Rajpura; Dera Bassi; Ghanaur; Sanour; Patiala; Samana; Shutrana
- Established: 1952
- Reservation: None

Member of Parliament
- 18th Lok Sabha
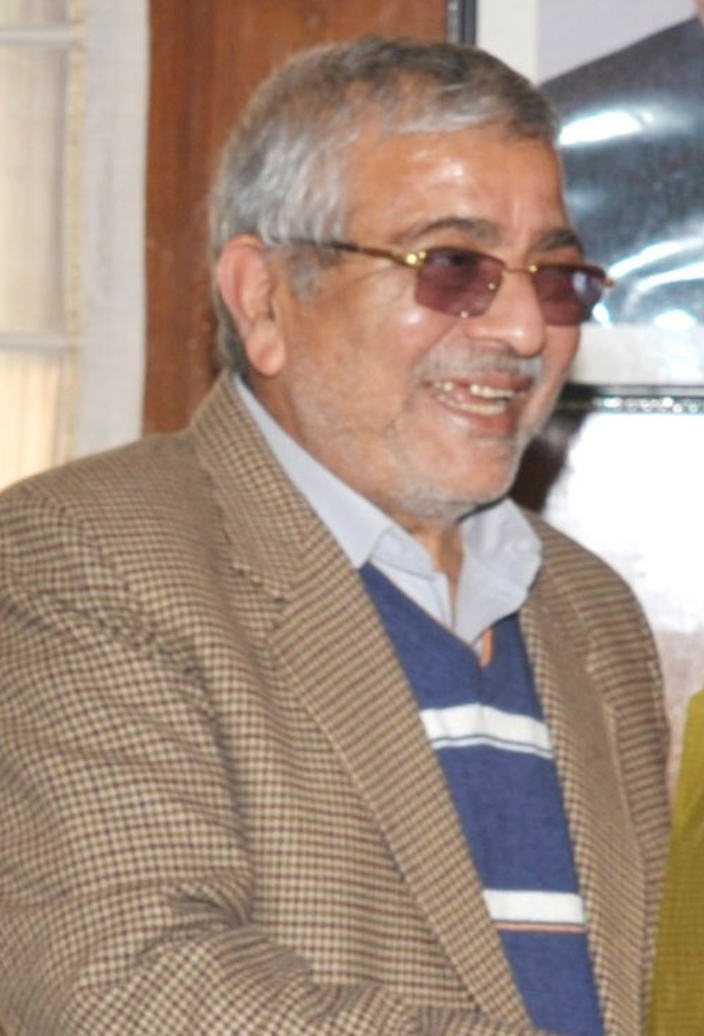
- Incumbent Dharamvir Gandhi
- Party: INC
- Alliance: INDIA
- Elected year: 2024
- Preceded by: Preneet Kaur

Patiala Lok Sabha constituency is one of the 13 Lok Sabha (parliamentary) constituencies in Punjab state in northern India.

== Assembly segments ==
This constituency comprises nine Vidhan Sabha (legislative assembly) segments. These are:

Constituency number	Name	District	Member	Party	Leading (in 2024)
109	Nabha (SC)	Patiala	Gurdev Singh Dev Maan	AAP	INC
110	Patiala Rural	Patiala	Balbir Singh	AAP	AAP
111	Rajpura	Patiala	Neena Mittal	AAP	BJP
112	Dera Bassi	S.A.S. Nagar	Kuljit Singh Randhawa	AAP	BJP
113	Ghanaur	Patiala	Gurlal Ghanaur	AAP	INC
114	Sanour	Patiala	Harmit Singh Pathanmajra	AAP	AAP
115	Patiala	Patiala	Ajit Pal Singh Kohli	AAP	BJP
116	Samana	Patiala	Chetan Singh Jaura Majra	AAP	AAP
117	Shutrana (SC)	Patiala	Kulwant Singh Bazigar	AAP	AAP

== Members of Parliament ==
Most Successful parties from Patiala Lok Sabha
1. INC (11 Times) (61.1%)
2. SAD (4 Times) (22.2%)
3. INC (I) (1 Time) (5.55%)
4. AAP (1 Time) (5.55%)
5. IND (1 Time) (5.55%)

Election	Member	Party
1952	Ram Pratap Garg	Indian National Congress
1957	Lala Achint Ram	Indian National Congress
1962	Sardar Hukam Singh	Indian National Congress
1967	Maharani Mohinder Kaur	Indian National Congress
1971	Sat Pal Kapur	Indian National Congress
1977	Gurcharan Singh Tohra	Shiromani Akali Dal
1980	Captain Amarinder Singh	Indian National Congress
1984	Charanjit Singh Walia	Shiromani Akali Dal
1989	Atinder Pal Singh	Independent
1991	Sant Ram Singla	Indian National Congress
1996	Prem Singh Chandumajra	Shiromani Akali Dal
1998	Prem Singh Chandumajra	Shiromani Akali Dal
1999	Preneet Kaur	Indian National Congress
2004	Preneet Kaur	Indian National Congress
2009	Preneet Kaur	Indian National Congress
2014	Dharamvir Gandhi	Aam Aadmi Party
2019	Preneet Kaur	Indian National Congress
2024	Dharamvir Gandhi	Indian National Congress

== Election results ==
=== 2024 ===
2024 Indian general election: Patiala
Party	Candidate	Votes	%	±%
INC	Dharamvir Gandhi	305,616	26.54	▼18.63
AAP	Balbir Singh	290,785	25.25	▲20.42
BJP	Preneet Kaur	288,998	25.09	New entry
SAD	Narinder Kumar Sharma	153,978	13.37	▼17.98
SAD(A)	Mohinder Pal Singh	47,274	4.10	
NOTA	None of the Above	6,681	0.58	
Majority		14,831	1.29	
Turnout		1,151,743		
Registered electors		1,806,424		
INC hold		Swing		

=== 2019 ===
2019 Indian general elections: Patiala
Party	Candidate	Votes	%	±%
INC	Preneet Kaur	532,027	45.17	▲14.42
SAD	Surjit Singh Rakhra	369,309	31.35	▲1.01
NPP	Dharamvir Gandhi	161,645	13.72	New
AAP	Neena Mittal	56,610	4.83	▼27.79
NOTA	None of the Above	11,110	0.94	▲0.67
Majority		162,718	13.82	▲11.96
Turnout		1,178,847	67.77	▼3.17
INC gain from AAP		Swing		

=== General elections - 2014 ===
2014 Indian general elections: Patiala
Party	Candidate	Votes	%	±%
AAP	Dharamvir Gandhi	365,671	32.62	New
INC	Preneet Kaur	344,729	30.75	▼19.91
SAD	Deepinder Singh Dhillon	340,109	30.34	▼9.92
Independent	Bibi Kamaldeep Kaur Rajoana	15,313	1.37	New
BSP	Ram Singh Dhiman	13,014	1.16	▼5.02
NOTA	None of the Above	3,008	0.27	New
Majority		20,942	1.86	▼8.54
Turnout		1,120,990	70.94	▲1.34
AAP gain from INC		Swing		

=== General elections 2009 ===
2009 Indian general elections: Patiala
Party	Candidate	Votes	%	±%
INC	Preneet Kaur	474,188	50.66	
SAD	Prem Singh Chandumajra	3,76,799	40.26	
BSP	Deepak Joshi	57,839	6.18	
Independent	Bant Singh	6,819	0.73	
Independent	Karamjit Singh	4,591	0.49	
Majority		97,389	10.40	
Turnout		9,36,005	69.60	
INC hold		Swing		

== See also ==
- Patiala district
- List of constituencies of the Lok Sabha
