= Lal Singh (politician) =

Indian politician (1942/1943–2026)

Member of Punjab Legislative Assembly
- In office 2012–2017
- Preceded by: Constituency established
- Succeeded by: Harinder Pal Singh Chandumajra
- Constituency: Sanour
- In office 2002–2012
- Constituency: Dakala
- In office 1990–1997
- Constituency: Dakala
- In office 1977–1985
- Constituency: Dakala

Personal details
- Born: 1942 or 1943
- Died: 28 March 2026 (aged 83) Mohali, Punjab, India

Lal Singh (1942 or 1943 – 28 March 2026) was an Indian politician. He was the Finance Minister of Punjab between 2002 and 2007 during the Amarinder Singh ministry. Singh was also president of the Punjab Pradesh Congress Committee. He was a member of Punjab Legislative Assembly and represented Sanour.

== Political career ==
Lal Singh first became a member of Punjab Legislative Assembly on the Congress ticket from Dakala in 1977. He represented Dakala five times until 2012, when Dakala underwent boundary delimitation. In 1985 and 1997 elections he lost to Shiromani Akali Dal candidates Prem Singh Chandumajra and Harmail Singh respectively. In 2012 elections, Singh successfully contested from Sanour.

== Personal life and death ==
Lal Singh was born in 1942 or 1943. His father's name was Sunder Singh and mother name is Shanti Devi.

Lal Singh died at a private hospital in Mohali, Punjab, on 28 March 2026, at the age of 83. He is survived by his son, former Samana MLA Kaka Rajinder Singh, and his daughter, Rupinder Kaur.
