= Daun kalan =

- village
- Location in Punjab, India Daun kalan (India)
- Coordinates: 30.395093°N 76.471289°E
- Country: India
- State: Punjab
- District: Patiala
- Vidhan Sabha constituency: Sanaur

Languages
  - Official: Punjabi
- Time zone: UTC+5:30 (IST)
- Telephone code: 0175
- Nearest city: Patiala

Daun kalan is a village in Patiala district, India. The Daun Kalan village has population of 3482 of which 1868 are males while 1614 are females as per Population Census 2011.
