= Romani people in Georgia (country) =

Romane manusha andi Gorgija (Romani)

Total population
- 604

Regions with significant populations
- Tbilisi

Languages
- Georgian, Romani

Religion
- Christian Orthodox, Romani mythology

Romani people in Georgia are citizens of Georgia who are of Romani descent. According to official figures, 604 Romani people officially live in Georgia, most of whom live in Tbilisi.

Many of these Roma came from other parts of the former Soviet Union. A large influx of Romani people fled eastern Ukraine and Moldova to Georgia due to the Soviet famine of 1930–1933.

The economic and social conditions for Georgian Roma are pretty rough. Most Romani people living in Georgia don't have much education, and they were taught Russian instead of Georgian, which makes it harder for them to find jobs in Georgia. A lot of Roma have Moldovan citizenship instead of Georgian citizenship, so they can't get welfare benefits. Police often hassle Romani market traders. In August 2003, something bad happened at a market in Tbilisi that turned into a violent attack: after a Romani merchant beat up a non-Roma woman, angry local people gathered together and started attacking Roma people, destroying their market stalls by setting them on fire. Some people say that market officials actually started the incident on purpose so they could take over the Roma trading stalls. Because of all this, a Roma Rights Defense Center was created in the country to help.
