= Sant Ram Singla =

Indian politician

Member of Parliament, Lok Sabha
- In office 1991–1996
- Preceded by: Atinder Pal Singh
- Succeeded by: Prem Singh Chandumajra
- Constituency: Patiala

Personal details
- Born: December 9, 1934 Gajewas, Patiala district, Punjab, British India (now in Punjab, India)
- Died: April 7, 2005 (aged 70)
- Party: Indian National Congress
- Spouse: Usha Singla
- Children: Two daughters and Vijay Inder Singla

Sant Ram Singla was an Indian politician. He was elected as the Member of Parliament, Lok Sabha as a member of the Indian National Congress from Patiala.
