= Sat Pal Kapur =

Indian politician (1931–2007)

Member of Parliament, Lok Sabha
- In office 1971–1977
- Preceded by: Mehtab Kaur of Patiala
- Succeeded by: Gurcharan Singh Tohra
- Constituency: Patiala

Personal details
- Born: 7 February 1931 Patiala, Punjab, British India (now in Punjab, India)
- Died: 19 July 2007 (aged 76) Patiala, India
- Party: Indian National Congress
- Spouse: Ghanshyam Thakur

Sat Pal Kapur (7 February 1931 – 19 July 2007) was an Indian politician. He was elected to the Lok Sabha, lower house of the Parliament of India as a member of the Indian National Congress.

Kapur died in Patiala on 19 July 2007, at the age of 76.
