= Rurki Kasba =

- Census town
- Location in Punjab (India), India Rurki Kasba (India)
- Coordinates: 30.3727°N 76.4785°E
- Country: India
- State: Punjab (India)
- District: Patiala

Population (2001)
  - Total: 8,186

Languages
- Time zone: UTC+5:30 (IST)

Rurki Kasba is a census town in Patiala district in the Indian state of Punjab.

== Demographics ==
As of 2001 India census, Rurki Kasba had a population of 8186. Males constitute 55% of the population and females 45%. Rurki Kasba has an average literacy rate of 69%, higher than the national average of 59.5%: male literacy is 74%, and female literacy is 63%. In Rurki Kasba, 14% of the population is under 6 years of age.
