= Dhanetha =

- village
- Location in Punjab, India Dhanetha (India)
- Coordinates: 30.108877°N 76.199154°E
- Country: India
- State: Punjab
- District: Patiala
- Vidhan Sabha constituency: shutrana

Languages
  - Official: Punjabi
- Time zone: UTC+5:30 (IST)
- Nearest city: Samana, Patiala

Dhanetha is a village situated in Samana Tehsil, Patiala District, Punjab, India.
