= Atinderpal Singh =

Former Member of the Lok Sabha

Member of Parliament, Lok Sabha
- In office 2 December 1989 – 13 March 1991
- Preceded by: Charanjit Singh Walia
- Succeeded by: Ram Singla
- Constituency: Patiala

Personal details
- Born: 30 March 1957 (age 69) Shahabad Markanda, East Punjab, India (now in Haryana, India)
- Party: Independent
- Spouse: Kamaljit Kaur

Atinderpal Singh also known as Atinder Pal Singh (born 30 March 1957) is a Sikh politician, Khalistani advocate and a former Member of the Parliament, Lok Sabha representing the constituency of Patiala between 2 December 1989 to 13 March 1991 (1 year and 3 months). He was elected to Lok Sabha, lower house of the Parliament of India.
