= Paind =

Coordinates: 29°54′N 76°06′E

Paind is a village near Shutrana which is in Punjab, India. It belongs to Patiala District.
