= Thekedar Madan Lal Jalalpur =

Indian politician from Punjab

Punjab Legislative Assembly
- In office 2017–2022
- Succeeded by: Gurlal Ghanaur
- Constituency: Ghanaur

Personal details
- Born: 19 August 1959 (age 66)
- Party: INC
- Profession: Politician

Thekedar Madan Lal Jalalpur (born 19 August 1959) is an Indian politician and a member of INC. In the 2017 Punjab Legislative Assembly election, he was elected as the member of the Punjab Legislative Assembly from Ghanaur.

== Member of Legislative Assembly ==
He won the Ghanaur Assembly constituency on an INC ticket, he beat the member of the Punjab Legislative Assembly Harpreet Kaur Mukhmailpur of the SAD by over 36557 votes.

== Electoral performance ==
Punjab Assembly election, 2017: Ghanaur
Party	Candidate	Votes	%	±%
INC	Thekedar Madan Lal Jalalpur	65,965	52.6	
SAD	Harpreet Kaur Mukhmailpur	29,408	23.4	
AAP	Anu Randhawa	23,188	18.5	
NOTA	None of the above	829	0.5	
Majority		36,557	29.3	
Turnout		124,650	80.5	
Registered electors		155,927		

Punjab Assembly election, 2022: Ghanaur
Party	Candidate	Votes	%	±%
AAP	Gurlal Ghanaur	62,783	48.14	
INC	Thekedar Madan Lal Jalalpur	31,018	23.78	
SAD	Prem Singh Chandumajra	24,141	18.51	
BJP	Vikas Sharma	5,728	4.39	New
Independent	Prem Singh Bhangu	1,681	1.29	
SAD(A)	Jagdeep Singh	1,593	1.22	
NOTA	None of the above	1,306	1	
Majority		31,765	24.36	
Turnout		1,30,423	78.97	
Registered electors		164,546		
AAP gain from INC		Swing		
