= Kakrala Bhaika =

- Country: India
- State: Punjab
- District: Patiala
- Time zone: UTC+5:30(IST)

Kakrala Bhaika is a large village located in the Patiala district of the Indian state of Punjab. The population was 7165 as of the 2011 census. Kakrala Bhaika is 110 km from Chandigarh and 37 km from Patiala. Bhaika is known for kabaddi.
