= Raninder Singh =

Indian politician and sports administrator

President of the National Rifle Association of India
- In office 29 December 2009 – 21 September 2024
- Preceded by: Digvijay Singh; Avtar Singh Sethi (Interim President)
- Succeeded by: Kalikesh Narayan Singh Deo

Vice President of the International Shooting Sport Federation
- In office 1 December 2018 – 30 November 2022
- President: Vladimir Lisin

Personal details
- Born: 2 August 1967 (age 59) Patiala, Punjab, India
- Party: Bharatiya Janata Party
- Other political affiliations: Punjab Lok Congress; Indian National Congress
- Spouse: Rishma Kaur (m. 1995)
- Children: 3
- Parents: Amarinder Singh (father); Preneet Kaur (mother)
- Pretender information
- Title(s): Yuvraj of Patiala
- Pretend from: 17 June 1974–present
- Monarchy abolished: Sovereign monarchy 1947 (Instrument of Accession); Titular monarchy 1971 (26th Amendment of the Indian Constitution)
- Predecessor: Amarinder Singh
- Successor: Yadauindra Singh

Raninder Singh (born 2 August 1967) is an Indian politician and sports administrator from Punjab, India, and son of former Chief Minister of Punjab, Amarinder Singh. He is the titular heir to the historical royal Phulkian dynasty of Patiala.

== Early life and education ==
Belonging to the former royal family of Patiala, Singh is the son of Amarinder Singh and Preneet Kaur. He has a sister Jai Inder Kaur. He attended Yadavindra Public School, Patiala and subsequently studied at The Doon School, Dehradun. He graduated from St. Stephen's College, Delhi and completed a master of business administration degree from Buckingham University, UK in 1990.

== Political career ==
He started his political career in late 1990s, by assisting with the election campaigns of his father and his mother, Preneet Kaur, who served as a Member of Parliament (MP) from the Patiala Lok Sabha constituency, having been elected four times as a candidate of the Indian National Congress in 1999, 2004, 2009, and 2019.

Subsequently he joined the Youth Congress division of the party himself. In 2005, he was appointed General Secretary of the Punjab Pradesh Congress Committee (PPCC) in 2005 and made in-charge of the Bathinda district. In the coming years, he worked in the region, and as a result he was credited for Congress winning the maximum seats in the Malwa region, in the State Assembly elections in India, 2007, while the party faced a rout in Majha and Doaba regions of Punjab.

He unsuccessfully contested for Lok Sabha elections against Harsimrat Kaur Badal, the wife of Punjab Deputy Chief Minister Sukhbir Singh Badal in the 2009 Indian general election, from Bathinda, in a high-profile run up to the elections. He lost in the 2012 Punjab Assembly elections in from the Samana constituency.

== Sports administration ==
He was appointed as the President of the National Rifle Association of India (NRAI) in December 2009. He won from his nearest rival Shyam Singh Yadav by a landslide majority. He has been an accomplished international level trap shooter himself.

Singh was elected as one of the vice-presidents of the International Shooting Sports Federation (ISSF) in November 2018 and he was the first Indian to be elected as vice-president of the ISSF. He served as one of the ISSF vice-presidents until November 2022. Singh, along with others who lost in the 2022 ISSF presidential election, was reported as being seen as a supporter of the then ISSF president and Russian oligarch, Vladimir Lisin.

== Personal life and family ==
He married Rishma Kaur (née Dhingra), daughter of Kuldip Singh Dhingra, a co-owner of Berger Paints, and Meeta Dhingra in 1995, and the couple have one son, Yadauinder Singh (b. 2003), and two daughters, Seherinder Kaur (b.1996) and Inayatinder Kaur (b.1999). In 2021, Seherinder married Aditya Narang, a businessman.
