= Nirmal Singh (Shutrana politician) =

Indian politician

MLA, Punjab Legislative Assembly
- In office 2017–2022
- Preceded by: Vaninder Kaur Loomba
- Succeeded by: Kulwant Singh Bazigar
- Constituency: Shutrana
- Majority: Indian National Congress

Personal details
- Party: Indian National Congress

Nirmal Singh is an Indian politician who represented the Shutrana Assembly constituency in the Punjab Legislative Assembly between 2017 and 2022. He is a member of the Indian National Congress. He was elected as the MLA in the 2017 Punjab Legislative Assembly election.

== Member of Legislative Assembly ==
Singh represented the Shutrana Assembly constituency between 2017 and 2022 after winning the election.

In the 2022 Punjab Legislative Assembly election he contested from Shutrana as a member of the Indian National Congress and was defeated by Aam Aadmi Party's candidate Kulwant Singh Bazigar by a large margin.

State Legislative Assembly
Preceded by Vaninder Kaur Loomba (SAD)	Member of the Punjab Legislative Assembly from Shutrana Assembly constituency 2017 – 2022	Succeeded by Kulwant Singh Bazigar (AAP)
