= Preneet Kaur =

Indian politician

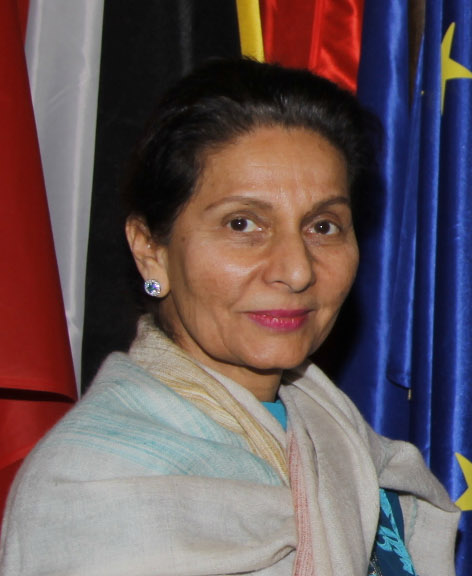

15th Spouse of the Chief Minister of Punjab
- In office 16 March 2017 – 19 September 2021
- Preceded by: vacant
- Succeeded by: Dr. Kamaljit Kaur
- In office 26 February 2002 – 1 March 2007
- Preceded by: Surinder Kaur
- Succeeded by: Surinder Kaur

Minister of State for External Affairs
- In office 28 May 2009 – October 2012
- Prime Minister: Manmohan Singh
- Minister: S. M. Krishna
- Preceded by: Anand Sharma
- Succeeded by: V. K. Singh

Member of Parliament, Lok Sabha
- In office 23 May 2019 – 4 June 2024
- Preceded by: Dharamvir Gandhi
- Succeeded by: Dharamvir Gandhi
- Constituency: Patiala
- In office 10 October 1999 – 18 May 2014
- Preceded by: Prem Singh Chandumajra
- Succeeded by: Dharamvir Gandhi
- Constituency: Patiala

Member of the Punjab Legislative Assembly
- In office August 2014 – March 2017
- Preceded by: Amarinder Singh
- Succeeded by: Amarinder Singh
- Constituency: Patiala Urban

Personal details
- Born: 3 October 1944 (age 82) Shimla, Punjab Province, British India
- Party: Bharatiya Janata Party (since 14 March 2024)
- Other political affiliations: Independent (February 2023 – 14 March 2024); Indian National Congress (until February 2023)
- Spouse: Amarinder Singh (m. 1964)
- Children: Jai Inder Kaur, Raninder Singh

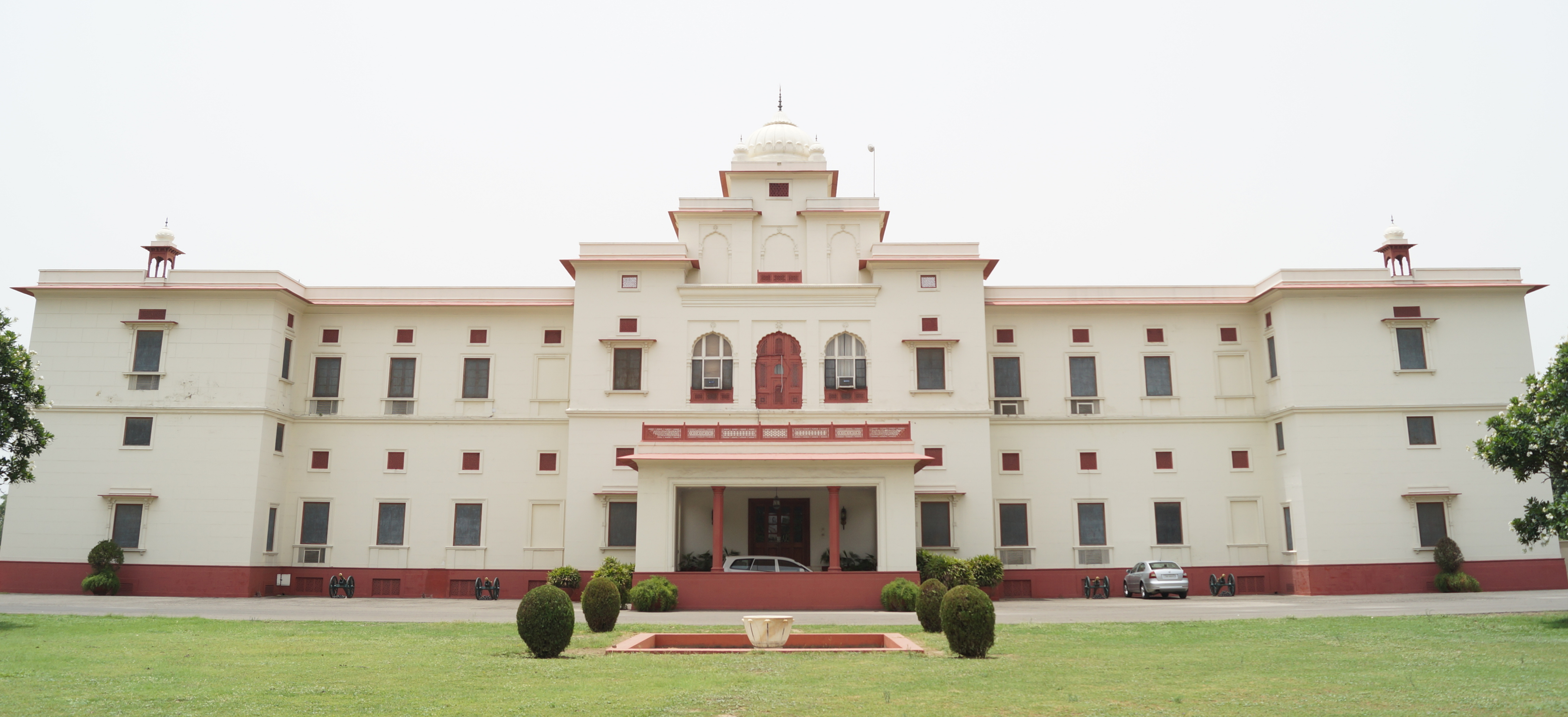
Residence of Preneet Kaur, New Moti Bagh Palace, Patiala.

Preneet Kaur (born 3 October 1944) is an Indian politician who served in the Government of India as a Minister of State in the Ministry of External Affairs from 2009 to 2014. She is married to Amarinder Singh, who was the 15th Chief Minister of Punjab. She is a member of the Bharatiya Janata Party. Previously she was a member of the Congress party, to which her husband also once belonged, and contested parliamentary elections repeatedly from the Patiala constituency. In February 2023, she was suspended from the party for supporting BJP leader and her husband Amarinder Singh and campaigning for candidates of the BJP or BJP-allied parties. She won the elections of 1999, 2004 and 2009, but lost her seat in the elections of 2014 and made a comeback by winning again in 2019, only to lose again in 2024, finishing in third place.

== Background and personal life ==
Praneet Kaur was born in Shimla, India into a Kahlon Jat Sikh family. She is the daughter of Sardar Gian Singh Kahlon, an officer in the Indian Civil Service, and Satinder Kaur. Gian Singh Kahlon entered the Indian Civil Service in 1937, when it was extremely rare for an Indian to be granted entry into that elite administrative service. He served in many senior positions, including as Chief Secretary of Punjab in the 1960s. He died in December 2002. Preneet Kaur has one brother, Himmat Singh Kahlon, who works for the UNO, and one sister, Geetinder Kaur, who is married to the politician and former IPS officer Simranjit Singh Mann. Praneet Kaur attended St. Bede's College, Shimla and graduated from The Convent of Jesus and Mary, Shimla.

In October 1964, Praneet Kaur was married to Capt. Amarinder Singh in a match arranged by parents in the usual Indian tradition. Her husband was the son and heir of the titular Maharaja of Patiala, formerly the ruler of the largest princely state in Punjab. Amarinder Singh, who was serving as an officer in the Indian Army at the time of the wedding, succeeded his father as titular Maharaja of Patiala in 1974, whereupon Praneet Kaur became the titular Maharani of Patiala. After resigning from the army, Amarinder Singh followed in the footsteps of his father and entered politics, where he met with great success. He was elected to parliament from the Patiala constituency in 1980, and to the Punjab state legislative assembly in 1985, 1992 and 2002, serving as minister in the state government for many years. In 2002, he took office as Chief Minister of Punjab for the first time and served a full five-year term until 2007. In March 2017, he again led the Congress party to victory in the state assembly elections and took office again as Chief Minister of Punjab for the second time, and held the position until 18 September 2021.

Praneet and Amarinder are the parents of two children, a son Raninder Singh (born 1967) and a daughter Jai Inder Kaur (born 1966). Raninder Singh is a politician who has contested elections both to parliament and to the state legislative assembly. He is married to Rishma Kaur, daughter of a businessman, Kuldip Singh Dhingra, owner of Berger Paints India Limited, and his wife Meeta Dhingra. Raninder and Rishma are the parents of three children, a son, Yaduinder Singh (born April 2003) and daughters Seherinder Kaur (b.1996) and Inayatinder Kaur (b.1999). Yaduinder, who is the youngest of Praneet's five grandchildren, is in line to become the titular Maharaja of Patiala in due course.

Praneet's daughter Jai Inder Kaur is married to Sardar Gurpal Singh Sandhu. Incidentally, Gurpal Singh's sister Ishwarpreet Kaur is married to Praneet Kaur's brother, Himmat Singh Kahlon. Gurpal Singh and Jai Inder Kaur are the parents of two sons, Angad and Nirvaan. In March 2015, Angad Singh Sandhu married Aparajita Kumari (they have a daughter, Rudrangini Kaur), princess of Bashahr, youngest daughter of Raja Virbhadra Singh of Bashahr, an active politician with the Congress Party and four-time Chief Minister of Himachal Pradesh (1983–90, 1993–98, 2003–07, 2012–17). In March 2017, just days before Amarinder Singh took office for the second time as Chief Minister of Punjab, Jai Inder's second son, Nirvaan Singh Sandhu, married Mriganka Singh Jamwal, princess of Kashmir, daughter of crown prince Vikramaditya Singh of Kashmir and his wife, Chitrangada Raje. Mriganka's paternal grandfather is Dr. Karan Singh, Maharaja of Jammu and Kashmir, again a politician belonging to the Congress party, while her maternal grandfather was Madhavrao Scindia, Maharaja of Gwalior and again a successful politician belonging to the Congress party. Mriganka's maternal uncle (Chitrangada Raje's brother) is the BJP politician who served as the Minister of Civil Aviation and Minister of Steel (2021 - 2024) and is serving as the Minister of Communication and Development of North Eastern Region (2024–Present).

Prior to entering politics, Preneet was instrumental in founding Sanjeevani, an institution in Patiala for disabled children. She started her political career by contesting the General elections of 1999 from the Patiala Lok Sabha constituency. Patiala was the capital of the princely state formerly ruled by her husband's family.

She won her seat in 1999, but her party lost the election and sat in opposition. After the next general elections (2004), her party formed the government and Preneet also retained her seat. She remained a back-bencher in Parliament, living mostly in Chandigarh where her husband was at this time Chief Minister of Punjab. During these two terms in the Lok Sabha, Preneet served in various committees, such as those on Food, Civil Supplies and Public Distribution; Women's Empowerment; Public Undertakings; and Water Resources. She also served on the Consultative Committees attached to the Ministry of Agriculture and the Ministry of Petroleum and Natural Gas.

In 2007, Amarinder demitted office after his party lost the elections to the state assembly. In 2009, after she won the Patiala seat for the third successive term in the elections of 2009, and during the UPA-II government, Praneet was made a Minister of State (MoS) in the Ministry of External Affairs. She was one of two Ministers of State who served under the Cabinet Minister for External Affairs.

In the general elections of 2014, Preneet lost the Patiala Lok Sabha seat to Dharamvir Gandhi of the Aam Aadmi Party by a margin of 20,942 votes. Preneet's party was routed at the parliamentary polls and demitted office.

She was one of the 42 INC MLAs who submitted their resignation in protest of a decision of the Supreme Court of India ruling Punjab's termination of the Sutlej-Yamuna Link (SYL) water canal unconstitutional.

== Controversy ==
In 2014, the BJP-ruled Union Government submitted to the Supreme Court of India a list of names of people who held Swiss bank accounts. The names were submitted in a sealed cover and not revealed to the public. However, the fact that a former union minister featured in the list became known and was reported by the press. One day before the list was submitted to the court, Preneet issued a statement saying that she had held a Swiss bank account for many years, and that this fact was known to the authorities. The statement also said that in 2011, Preneet had given clarifications to the finance ministry regarding this matter.
