= 69th Armoured Regiment (India) =

Indian Army regiment

- Active: 1968 – present
- Country: India
- Allegiance: India
- Branch: Indian Army
- Type: Armoured Corps
- Size: Regiment
- Mottos: एकता मान वीरता "Ekta-Maan-Virta" (Unity, Honour, Bravery)
- Equipment: T-72
- Battle honours: Bogra; East Pakistan

Commanders
- Colonel of the Regiment: Lieutenant General Vipul Singhal
- Notable commanders: Brigadier Neil John, SM

Insignia
- Abbreviation: 69 Armd Regt

69 Armoured Regiment is an armoured regiment of the Indian Army.

== Formation ==
The regiment was raised on 1 October 1968 at Ahmednagar. It drew on troops from the Regiment of Artillery and Infantry battalions. It has an all-India all-class composition, drawing troops from various castes and religions.

== Equipment ==
The regiment was initially equipped with PT-76 tanks, which also took part during 1971 War. The regiment presently has the T-72 tanks.

== Operations ==
Indo-Pakistani War of 1971

The regiment commanded by Lieutenant Colonel Pawittar Singh was part of the XXXIII Corps and saw action in the Northwestern sector in the liberation of Bangladesh.

It captured Charkai on 4 December 1971. The regiment less one squadron along with a combat group of 2/5 Gorkha Rifles advanced along the Nawabganj-Chandipur-Lal Dighi Bazaar-Pirganj axis. It captured Chandipur town and Pirganj on 7 December 1971. The regiment along with one squadron of 63 Cavalry and 6 Guards grouped under Lieutenant Colonel Pawittar Singh captured Palasbari on 9 December 1971.

On 11 and 12 December 1971, the regiment along with 5/11 Gorkha Rifles outflanked the Pakistani defences and established a roadblock across the Karatoya River for the capture of Gobindganj. On 12 December 1971, around 1500 hours, one of the leading tanks of 69 Armoured Regiment was hit and destroyed by an enemy recoilless anti-tank gun from across the banks of the lchhamati Nala. On 13/14 December, night, 69 Armoured Regiment less a squadron, with 6 Guards less a company under its command, carried out an outflanking move from the east and established roadblocks on roads Bogra-Sirajganj (southeast of Bogra) and Bogra-Singra (southwest of Bogra). On 14 December, Bogra was attacked from two directions – 69 Armoured Regiment from the south of Bogra and 2/5 Gorkha Rifles with A Squadron of 63 Cavalry from the north. Both attacks met with stiff Pakistani resistance in the built-up area. However, after fierce fighting, by 1300 hours, all areas north of the railway line had been cleared. On 15 December, troops of Pakistani 205 Infantry Brigade surrendered to 2/5 Gorkha Rifles. The regiment took the surrender of the Pakistani 29th Cavalry on 16 December 1971 at Bogra.

The regiment lost one JCO and nine other ranks during these operations. It won one Vir Chakra, four Sena Medals and two Mention-in-Despatches. The regiment was also conferred with the Battle Honour ‘Bogra’ and the Theatre Honour ‘East Pakistan 1971’.

Other operations

The Regiment has participated and displayed the gallantry in Operation Rakshak between 1991 and 1996. It took part in Operation "Jal Tarang" during the July 1993 floods in Punjab. The regiment was especially involved in the Patran area, which was badly affected by the floods. Two columns of 69 Armoured Regiment were deployed for anti-flood operation from 12 to 20 July 1993 and saved over 2000 lives.

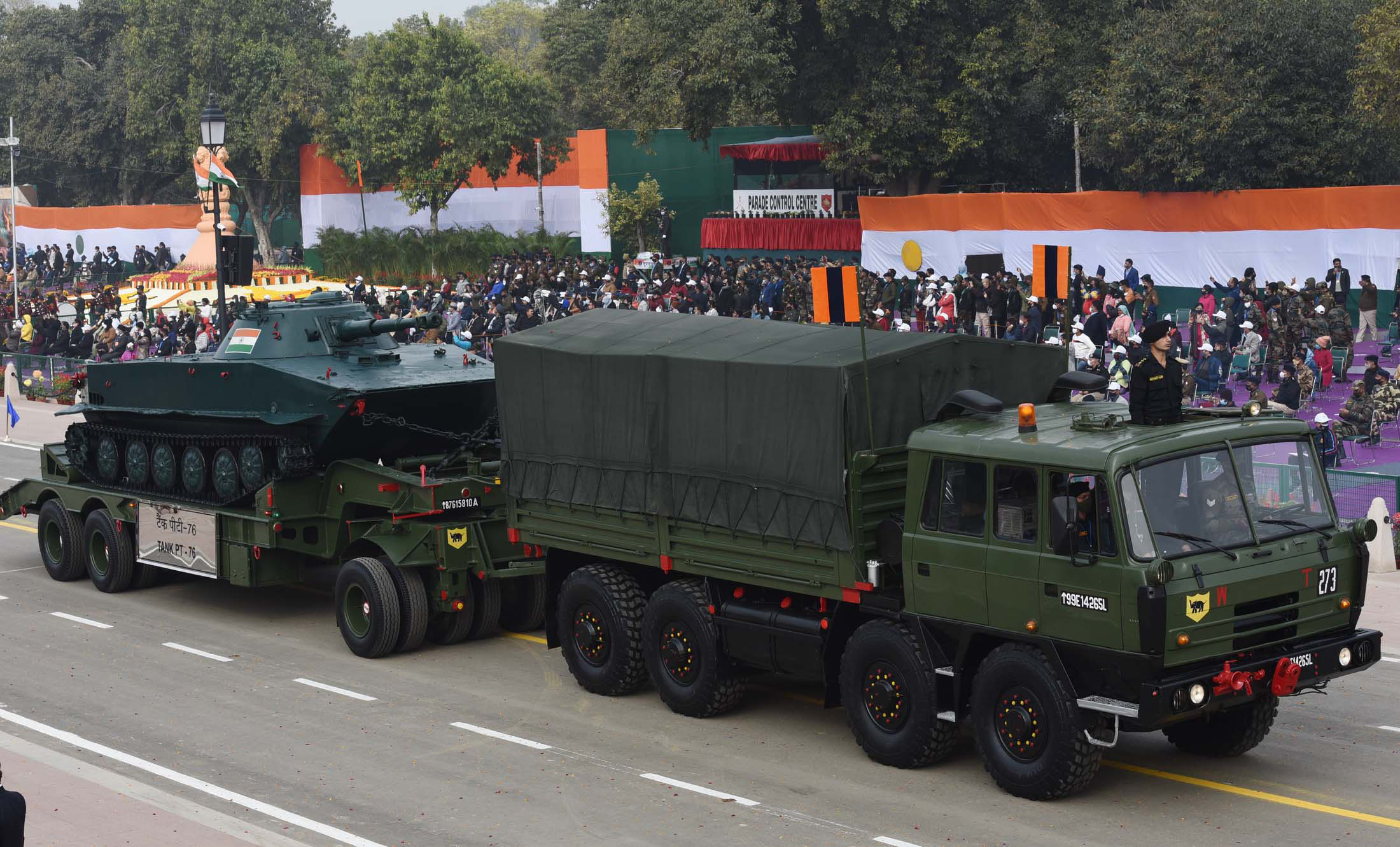
PT-76 tank (on tank transporter) during the Republic Day Parade, 2022. This parade showcased equipment used during the 1971 Indo-Pakistan war, on its 50th anniversary, which lead to the formation of Bangladesh.

== Awards and honours ==
- Shaurya Chakra : Major Tanuj Grover
- Vir Chakra : Nb Ris Basta Singh
- President's Standard : The Regiment was presented the President's Standard on 1 December 2003 by the then President of India Dr A. P. J. Abdul Kalam at Hisar.
- The Regiment had the honour of participating in the Republic Day parade in 1994 with its T-72 tanks.
- It showcased the PT-76 tanks during the Republic Day Parade in 2022 to commemorate the 50th anniversary of the Indo-Pakistan war of 1971.

== Regimental Insignia ==
The Regimental insignia consists of a front facing PT-76 tank with crossed lances with pennons in red and white. The motto of the Regiment is एकता मान वीरता (Ekta-Maan-Virta), which translates to ‘Unity, Honour and Bravery’.
