= Banaur =

Banur
- city
- Location in Punjab, India Banur (India)
- Coordinates: 30.5556°N 76.7183°E
- Country: India
- State: Punjab
- District: Patiala
- Elevation: 277 m (909 ft)

Population (2001)
  - Total: 15,005

Languages
  - Official: Punjabi
- Time zone: UTC+5:30 (IST)

Banur is a city and a municipal council in Patiala district in the state of Punjab, India.

== Demographics ==
As of 2001 India census, Banur had a population of 15,005. Males constitute 54% of the population and females 46%. Banur has an average literacy rate of 61%, higher than the national average of 59.5%; with 58% of the males and 42% of females literate. 15% of the population is under 6 years of age.
