= Saidkheri =

Coordinates: 30°26′46″N 76°34′41″E

Said Kheri is a village situated in Rajpura Tehsil of Patiala District, India. This village was established by a Muslim saint Said Raju, who was also known as Zinda Pir. The real name of Said Raju was Shah Raju and he was born in Bhor village. He migrated to the place later called as Said Kheri on the insistence of the then Raja of the area. After the death of Said Raju, a mazar was built that attracted people of different religions. As many as 10 generations of Said Raju, who was called Dada Raju in the village, passed their lives in Said Kheri till 1947 partition of the sub-continent.
