= Sahib Bir Singh =

Indian boxer

Personal information
- Nationality: Indian
- Born: 27 January 1990 (age 36) Parour, Punjab, India
- Height: 6 ft 0 in (183 cm)
- Weight: Super heavyweight

Boxing career

Boxing record
- Total fights: 10
- Wins: 07
- Win by KO: 04
- Losses: 03

Sahib Bir Singh (born 27 January 1990) is all India inter university silver medalist in Boxing and gold medalist Punjab games 2016. He was born into the Jatt Sikh family on 27 January 1990 in the Parour village, Patiala district, Punjab.
