= Vaninder Kaur Loomba =

Indian politician

MLA, Punjab
- In office 2012 – 2017
- Preceded by: Nirmal Singh
- Succeeded by: Nirmal Singh
- Constituency: Shutrana

Personal details
- Party: Shiromani Akali Dal

Vaninder Kaur Loomba is an Indian politician. She was a member of Punjab Legislative Assembly between 2012-2017 and represented Shutrana Assembly Constituency.

== Family ==
Loomba is married to Karan Singh.

== Political career ==
=== Member of Legislative Assembly ===
Loomba successfully contested election from Shutrana in 2012 and became member of Punjab Vidhan Sabha.

She represented the Shutrana Assembly Constituency until 2022.

In the 2022 Punjab Legislative Assembly election she contested from Shutrana as a member of the Shiromani Akali Dal and was defeated by Aam Aadmi Party's candidate Kulwant Singh Bazigar by a large margin of 51,554 votes.

== Electoral performance ==
Punjab Assembly election, 2022: Shutrana
Party	Candidate	Votes	%	±%
AAP	Kulwant Singh Bazigar	81,751	59.35	
SAD	Vaninder Kaur Loomba	30,197	21.92	
INC	Darbara Singh	11,353	8.24	
NOTA	None of the above	1,536	1.12	
Majority		51,554	37.43	
Turnout		137,739	75.54	
Registered electors		182,335		
AAP gain from INC		Swing		

State Legislative Assembly
Preceded by Nirmal Singh (INC)	Member of the Punjab Legislative Assembly from Shutrana Assembly constituency 2012 – 2017	Succeeded by Nirmal Singh (INC)
