= Berger Paints =

Indian multinational paint company

Berger Paints India Limited
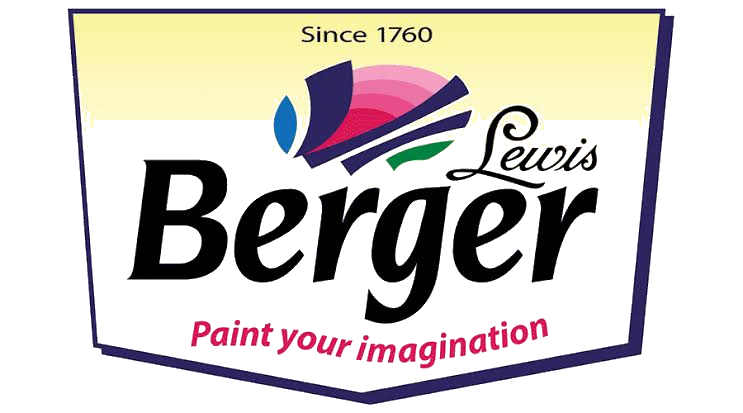
- Trade name: Berger
- Type: Public
- Traded as: BSE: 509480; NSE: BERGEPAINT
- ISIN: INE463A01038
- Industry: Chemicals
- Founded: 17 December 1923; 102 years ago
- Headquarters: Kolkata, West Bengal, India
- Key people: Rishma Kaur (Chairman); Kanwardip Singh Dhingra (Vice Chairman); Abhijit Roy (Managing Director
- Products: Chemicals; Decorative paints; Industrial finishing products; Coatings
- Revenue: ▲₹11,262 crore (US$1.2 billion) (2024)
- Operating income: ▲₹1,557 crore (US$160 million) (2024)
- Net income: ▲₹1,170 crore (US$120 million) (2024)
- Total assets: ▲₹8,369 crore (US$870 million) (2024)
- Total equity: ▲₹5,389 crore (US$560 million) (2024)
- Owners: Dhingra family (75%)
- Number of employees: 3,600 (2020)
- Parent: Berger Paints Group Ltd
- Website: bergerpaints.com

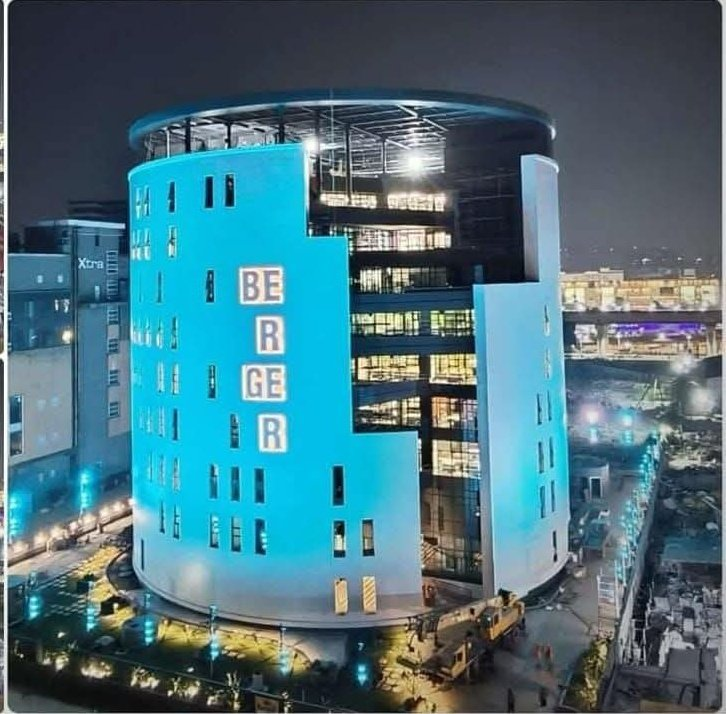
Headquarters in Newtown, Kolkata

Berger Paints India Ltd is an Indian multinational paint company, based in Kolkata. The company, which is a subsidiary of the British paint company, Berger Paints Group, has 16 manufacturing units in India, 2 in Nepal, and 1 each in Poland and Russia. It has manufacturing units at Howrah, Rishra, Arinso, Taloja, Naltoli, Goa, Devla, Hindupur, Jejuri, Jammu, Puducherry and Anand. The company has presence in six countries – India, Russia, Poland, Nepal. It has an employee strength of over 3,600 and a countrywide distribution network of more than 25,000 dealers.

== History ==
=== European ===
In 1760, Louis Berger started a dye and pigment manufacturing business in England, which later changed to Louis Berger & Sons Limited. In 1770, Louis Steigenberger shifted from Frankfurt to London to sell a Prussian blue colour, which was made using his own formula. He perfected this process & art of the blue colour, which was the colour of most military uniforms of that time. He then changed his name to Lewis Berger. By 1870, Berger Paints was selling 19 different pigments such as black lead, sulphur, sealing wax and mustard. After his death, his sons took over the business. In the UK, the company, which by then was known as Berger, Jenson and Nicholson, was acquired by Hoechst AG in 1970 and by Williams Holdings in 1988.

=== Indian subcontinent ===
On 17 December 1923, Mr. Hadfield set up Hadfield's (India) Ltd., a small paint company in Calcutta. Towards the end of 1947, British Paints acquired Hadfield's (India) Ltd and thus British Paints (India) Ltd was incorporated in the State of West Bengal. In 1951, sales offices were opened in Delhi and Bombay and a depot was started in Guwahati. In 1969, Berger Jenson Nicholson Limited, UK bought British Paints (India) Ltd. This marked the beginning of Lewis Berger's legacy in India. In the year 1973, D. Madhukar took over as the managing director. Sales figures reached over ₹16 crore by 1978. The 80s, and the 90s, saw the launch of many new products such as emulsions and distempers. In 1991, UB Group sold the company to Kuldip Singh Dhingra, a shopkeeper from Amritsar, and Gurbachan Singh Dhingra. Subir Bose took over as managing director on 1 July 1994. Bose retired on 30 June 2012, handing over the company to Abhijit Roy, the current managing director.

In March 2013, Berger Paints acquired Mumbai-based architectural paints division of Sherwin-Williams. In 2021, Berger Paints set up their plant in Sandila, Uttar Pradesh.

=== Pakistan ===
On 25 March 1950, Berger Paints Pakistan Limited was incorporated in Pakistan. In 1955, the Karachi factory was established. In 1974, Berger Pakistan became a public limited company. In 1974, Berger Pakistan 50.62% shares were held by Jenson & Nicholson Limited (U.K. parent company), 49.38% shares were held by Pakistani investors. In 1991, Slotrapid Limited, a British Virgin Island company, acquired control of Berger Paints Pakistan Limited by purchasing 50.62% shares of the company.

=== Bangladesh ===
In the geographical region of Bangladesh, Berger Paints were imported from Berger UK and then from Berger Pakistan. In 1970, the Kalurghat, Chittagong factory was inaugurated. In 1980, the name of the company changed from J&N (Bangladesh) Limited to Berger Paints Bangladesh Limited. The Indian company does not have any share in it.

== Operations ==
Apart from operations in Russia and a production facility at the Berger manufacturing unit at Krasnodar, Berger Paints India also has an operational unit in Nepal. They have also acquired Bolix SA of Poland, a provider of External Insulation Finishing Systems (EIFS) in Eastern Europe.
