= Sanour Assembly constituency =

Legislative Assembly constituency in Punjab State, India

Coordinates: 30.3°N 76.46°E

Sanour
- Constituency No. 114 for the Punjab Legislative Assembly

Constituency details
- Country: India
- State: Punjab
- District: Patiala
- Lok Sabha constituency: Patiala
- Total electors: 223,614
- Reservation: None

Member of Legislative Assembly
- 16th Punjab Legislative Assembly
- Incumbent Harmeet Singh Pathanmajra
- Party: Aam Aadmi Party
- Elected year: 2022

Sanour Assembly constituency (Sl. No.: 114) is a Punjab Legislative Assembly constituency in Patiala district, Punjab state, India.

== Members of Legislative Assembly ==
Most successful parties from Sanour Vidhan Sabha
1. AAP (1 Time) (33.3%)
2. INC (1 Time) (33.3%)
3. SAD (1 Time) (33.3%)

Year	Member	Party
2012	Lal Singh	Indian National Congress
2017	Harinder Pal Singh Chandumajra	Shiromani Akali Dal
2022	Harmeet Singh Pathanmajra	Aam Aadmi Party

== Election results ==
=== 2027 ===
Punjab Assembly election, 2027: Sanour
Party	Candidate	Votes	%	±%
AAP	Ranjodh Singh Hadana			
BJP	Harmeet Singh Pathanmajra			New entry
AD (WPD)				New entry
INC				
BSP				
SAD				
NOTA	None of the above			
Majority				
Turnout				

=== 2022 ===
Punjab Assembly election, 2022: Sanour
Party	Candidate	Votes	%	±%
AAP	Harmeet Singh Pathanmajra	83,893	50.84	▲30.74
SAD	Harinder Pal Singh Chandumajra	34,771	21.07	▼14.63
INC	Harinder Pal Singh Mann	25,408	15.4	▼17.40
PLC	Bikramjit Inder Singh Chahal	9,223	5.59	New entry
SAD(A)	Vikramjeet Singh	4,935	2.99	▲2.74
NOTA	None of the above	1,617	0.7	
Majority		49,122	29.77	
Turnout		165,007	73.8	
Registered electors		223,610		
AAP gain from SAD		Swing		

=== 2017 ===
Punjab Assembly election, 2017: Sanour
Party	Candidate	Votes	%	±%
SAD	Harinder Pal Singh Chandumajra	58,867	35.7	▼10.5
INC	Harinder Pal Singh Mann	53,997	32.8	▼16.1
AAP	Kuldeep Kaur Tohra	33,179	20.1	New entry
NOTA	None of the above	769	0.4	N/A
Majority		4,870	3.0	▲0.3
Turnout		164,022	80.4	▼2.1
Registered electors		204,931		
SAD gain from INC				

=== 2012 ===
Punjab Assembly election, 2012: Sanour
Party	Candidate	Votes	%	±%
INC	Lal Singh	71,029	48.95	New entry
SAD	Tejinderpal Singh Sandhu	67,122	46.26	New entry
BSP	Ram Sarup	3,025	2.08	New entry
SAD(A)	Naunihal Singh	803	0.55	New entry
Majority		3,907	2.69	
Turnout		145,111	82.05	
Registered electors		176,847		
INC win (new seat)				

== See also ==
- List of constituencies of the Punjab Legislative Assembly
- Patiala district
