= Ghanaur Assembly constituency =

Legislative Assembly constituency in Punjab State, India

Coordinates: 30.33°N 76.61°E

Ghanaur
- Constituency No. 113 for the Punjab Legislative Assembly

Constituency details
- Country: India
- State: Punjab
- District: Patiala
- Lok Sabha constituency: Patiala
- Established: 1951
- Total electors: 1,64,546 (in 2022)
- Reservation: None

Member of Legislative Assembly
- 16th Punjab Legislative Assembly
- Incumbent Gurlal Ghanaur
- Party: Aam Aadmi Party
- Elected year: 2022

Ghanaur Assembly constituency is one of the 117 Legislative Assembly constituencies of Punjab state in India. It is part of Patiala district.

== Members of the Legislative Assembly ==
Most successful parties from Ghanaur Vidhan Sabha
1. SAD (5 Times) (45.5%)
2. INC (5 Times) (45.5%)
3. AAP (1 Time) (9.09%)

Year	Member	Party
As part of PEPSU Legislative Assembly (1951–54)
1952	Kirpal Singh	Indian National Congress
Constituency defunct (1954-1977)
As part of Punjab Legislative Assembly (1977–Present)
1977	Jasdev Kaur Sandhu	Shiromani Akali Dal
1980	Jasdev Kaur Sandhu	Shiromani Akali Dal
1985	Jasdev Singh Sandhu	Shiromani Akali Dal
1992	Jasjit Singh	Indian National Congress
1997	Ajaib Singh Mukhmailpura	Shiromani Akali Dal
2002	Jasjit Singh	Indian National Congress
2007	Thekedar Madan Lal Jalalpur	Indian National Congress
2012	Harpreet Kaur Mukhmailpura	Shiromani Akali Dal
2017	Thekedar Madan Lal Jalalpur	Indian National Congress
2022	Gurlal Ghanaur	Aam Aadmi Party

== Election results ==
=== 2027 ===
Punjab Assembly election, 2027: Ghanaur
Party	Candidate	Votes	%	±%
AAP				
AD (WPD)				New entry
INC				
BSP				
SAD				
BJP				
NOTA	None of the above			
Majority				
Turnout				

=== 2022 ===
Punjab Assembly election, 2022: Ghanaur
Party	Candidate	Votes	%	±%
AAP	Gurlal Ghanaur	62,783	48.14	
INC	Thekedar Madan Lal Jalalpur	31,018	23.78	
SAD	Prem Singh Chandumajra	24,141	18.51	
BJP	Vikas Sharma	5,728	4.39	New
Independent	Prem Singh Bhangu	1,681	1.29	
SAD(A)	Jagdeep Singh	1,593	1.22	
NOTA	None of the above	1,306	1	
Majority		31,765	24.36	
Turnout		130,423	78.97	
Registered electors		164,546		
AAP gain from INC		Swing		

=== 2017 ===
Punjab Assembly election, 2017: Ghanaur
Party	Candidate	Votes	%	±%
INC	Thekedar Madan Lal Jalalpur	65,965	52.6	
SAD	Harpreet Kaur Mukhmailpur	29,408	23.4	
AAP	Anu Randhawa	23,188	18.5	
NOTA	None of the above	829	0.5	
Majority		36,557	29.3	
Turnout		124,650	80.5	
Registered electors		155,927		

== See also ==
- List of constituencies of the Punjab Legislative Assembly
- Patiala district
