= Rajpura Assembly constituency =

Legislative Assembly constituency in Punjab State, India

Coordinates: 30.48°N 76.59°E

Rajpura
- Constituency No. 111 for the Punjab Legislative Assembly

Constituency details
- Country: India
- State: Punjab
- District: Patiala
- Lok Sabha constituency: Patiala
- Established: 1956
- Total electors: 182,694
- Reservation: None

Member of Legislative Assembly
- 16th Punjab Legislative Assembly
- Incumbent Neena Mittal
- Party: Aam Aadmi Party
- Elected year: 2022

Rajpura Assembly constituency is one of the 111 Legislative Assembly constituencies of Punjab state in India. It is part of Patiala district and is unreserved.

== Members of the Legislative Assembly ==
Most successful parties from Rajpura Vidhan Sabha
1. INC (10 Times) (58.8%)
2. BJP (2 Times) (11.8%)
3. AAP (1 Time) (5.88%)
4. BJS (1 Time) (5.88%)
5. CPI (M) (1 Time) (5.88%)
6. JP (1 Time) (5.88%)
7. SAD (1 Time) (5.88%)

Year	Member	Party
As part of PEPSU Legislative Assembly (1951–56)
1952	Prem Singh	Indian National Congress
1954	Prem Singh	Indian National Congress
As part of Punjab Legislative Assembly (1956–Present)
1957	Prem Singh	Indian National Congress
1962	Prem Singh	Indian National Congress
1967	S. Parkash	Indian National Congress
1969	Harbans Lal	Bharatiya Jana Sangh
1972	Brij Lal	Indian National Congress
1977	Harbans Lal	Janata Party
1980	Balwant Singh	Communist Party of India (Marxist)
1985	Prem Chand	Shiromani Akali Dal
1992	Raj Kumar Khurana	Indian National Congress
1997	Balram Das Tandon	Bharatiya Janta Party
2002	Raj Khurana	Indian National Congress
2007	Raj Khurana	Bharatiya Janta Party
2012	Hardial Singh Kamboj	Indian National Congress
2017	Hardial Singh Kamboj	Indian National Congress
2022	Neena Mittal	Aam Aadmi Party

== Election results ==
=== 2027 ===
Punjab Assembly election, 2027: Rajpura
Party	Candidate	Votes	%	±%
AAP				
BJP	Hardial Singh Kamboj			
AD (WPD)				New entry
INC				
BSP				
SAD				
NOTA	None of the above			
Majority				
Turnout				

=== 2022 ===
Punjab Assembly election, 2022: Rajpura
Party	Candidate	Votes	%	±%
AAP	Neena Mittal	54,834	40.4	
BJP	Jagdish Kumar Jagga	32,341	23.80	
INC	Hardial Singh Kamboj	28,589	21.1	
SAD	Charanjit Singh Brar	15,006	11.1	
NOTA	None of the above	936	0.5	
Majority		22,493	16.45	
Turnout		136,759	74.9	
Registered electors		182,688		

=== 2017 ===
Punjab Assembly election, 2017: Rajpura
Party	Candidate	Votes	%	±%
INC	Hardial Singh Kamboj	59,107	46.151	
AAP	Ashutosh Joshi	26,542	20.72	
BJP	Harjit Singh Grewal	19,151	14.95	
Independent	Jagdish Kumar Jagga	15,073	11.77	
NOTA	None of the above	1,026	0.81	
Majority		32,565	25.6	
Turnout		127,047	76.9	
Registered electors		166,627		

== See also ==
- List of constituencies of the Punjab Legislative Assembly
- Patiala district
