= Dera Bassi Assembly constituency =

Legislative Assembly constituency in Punjab State, India

Coordinates: 30.59°N 76.84°E

Dera Bassi
- Constituency No. 112 for the Punjab Legislative Assembly

Constituency details
- Country: India
- State: Punjab
- District: Mohali
- Lok Sabha constituency: Patiala
- Total electors: 287,622 (in 2022)
- Reservation: None

Member of Legislative Assembly
- 16th Punjab Legislative Assembly
- Incumbent Kuljit Singh Randhawa
- Party: Aam Aadmi Party
- Elected year: 2022

Dera Bassi Assembly constituency (Sl. No.: 112) is a Punjab Legislative Assembly constituency in Sahibzada Ajit Singh Nagar district, Punjab state, India.

== Members of the Legislative Assembly ==
Most successful parties from Dera Bassi Vidhan Sabha
1. SAD (2 Times) (66.7%)
2. AAP (1 Time) (33.3%)

| Year | Member | Picture | Party |
|---|---|---|---|
| 2012 | Narinder Kumar Sharma | | Shiromani Akali Dal |
| 2017 | Narinder Kumar Sharma | | Shiromani Akali Dal |
| 2022 | Kuljit Singh Randhawa | | Aam Aadmi Party |

== Election results ==
=== 2027 ===
Punjab Assembly election, 2027: Dera Bassi
| Party | Candidate | Votes | % | ±% |
|---|---|---|---|---|
| AAP | | | | |
| AD (WPD) | | | | New entry |
| INC | | | | |
| BSP | | | | |
| SAD | | | | |
| BJP | | | | |
| NOTA | None of the above | | | |
| Majority | | | | |
| Turnout | | | | |

=== 2022 ===
Punjab Assembly election, 2022: Dera Bassi
| Party | Candidate | Votes | % | ±% |
|---|---|---|---|---|
| AAP | Kuljit Singh Randhawa | 70,032 | 35.1 | ▲16.49 |
| INC | Deepinder Singh Dhillon | 48,311 | 24.21 | ▼14.45 |
| SAD | Narinder Kumar Sharma | 47,731 | 23.92 | ▼15.82 |
| BJP | Sanjiv Khanna | 26,963 | 13.51 | New entry |
| NOTA | None of the above | 1,412 | 0.71 | |
| RRP | Yog Raj Sahota | 224 | 0.11 | New entry |
| Majority | | 21,721 | 10.89 | |
| Turnout | | 199,529 | | |
| Registered electors | | 287,622 | | |
| AAP gain from SAD | | | | |

=== 2017 ===
Punjab Assembly election, 2017: Dera Bassi
| Party | Candidate | Votes | % | ±% |
|---|---|---|---|---|
| SAD | Narinder Kumar Sharma | 70,792 | 39.74 | ▼4.94 |
| INC | Deepinder Singh Dhillon | 68,871 | 38.66 | ▲31.96 |
| AAP | Sarabjit Kaur | 33,150 | 18.61 | New entry |
| NOTA | None of the above | 1,345 | 0.6 | |
| Majority | | 1,921 | 1.1 | |
| Turnout | | 176,795 | 74.3 | |
| Registered electors | | 239,885 | | |
| SAD hold | | | | |

=== 2012 ===
Punjab Assembly election, 2012: Dera Bassi
| Party | Candidate | Votes | % | ±% |
|---|---|---|---|---|
| SAD | Narinder Kumar Sharma | 63,285 | 44.68 | New entry |
| Independent | Deepinder Singh Dhillon | 51,248 | 36.18 | New entry |
| INC | Jasjit Singh Randhawa | 9,484 | 6.70 | New entry |
| Independent | Manpreet Kaur Dolly | 7,563 | 5.34 | New entry |
| Majority | | 12,037 | 8.50 | |
| Turnout | | 141,644 | 79.32 | |
| Registered electors | | 178,581 | | |
| SAD win (new seat) | | | | |
