= Kuljit Singh Randhawa =

Indian politician

MLA, Punjab Legislative Assembly
- Incumbent
- Assumed office 2022
- Constituency: Dera Bassi
- Majority: Aam Aadmi Party

Personal details
- Born: Derabassi
- Citizenship: Indian
- Party: Aam Aadmi Party
- Occupation: Transporter
- Profession: Politician

Kuljit Singh Randhawa is an Indian politician and the MLA representing the Dera Bassi Assembly constituency in the Punjab Legislative Assembly. He is a member of the Aam Aadmi Party. He was elected as the MLA in the 2022 Punjab Legislative Assembly election. He has been President of Truck Union of Derabassi for 16 years.

He has been chosen as Vice-President of ALL PUNJAB TRANSPORT UNION.

== Member of Legislative Assembly ==
He represents the Dera Bassi Assembly constituency as MLA in Punjab Assembly. The Aam Aadmi Party gained a strong 79% majority in the sixteenth Punjab Legislative Assembly by winning 92 out of 117 seats in the 2022 Punjab Legislative Assembly election. MP Bhagwant Mann was sworn in as Chief Minister on 16 March 2022. He has been elected as president of Truck Union Derabassi 4 times and has served as president of all Punjab Transport Union in 2019. He has been chosen as Member of Zila Parishad of District Patiala by lead of 23460 votes from block Bhankharpur.

Committee assignments of Punjab Legislative Assembly

- Member (2022–23) Committee on Local Bodies
- Member (2022–23) Committee on Panchayati Raj Institutions
- Member (2023–24) Privilege Committee of Vidhan Sabha

== Electoral performance ==
Punjab Assembly election, 2022: Dera Bassi
Party	Candidate	Votes	%	±%
AAP	Kuljit Singh Randhawa	70,032	35.1	
INC	Deepinder Singh Dhillon	48,311	24.21	
SAD	Narinder Kumar Sharma	47,731	23.92	
BJP	Sanjiv Khanna	26,963	13.51	New entry
NOTA	None of the above	1,412	0.71	
RRP	Yog Raj Sahota	224	0.11	
Majority		21,721	10.89	
Turnout		199,529		
Registered electors		287,622		
AAP gain from SAD				

State Legislative Assembly
Preceded by -	Member of the Punjab Legislative Assembly from Dera Bassi Assembly constituency 2022 –	Incumbent
