= Gurbachan Singh Dhingra =

Indian businessman

Gurbachan Singh Dhingra is an Indian entrepreneur and a co-owner of Berger Paints.

Dhingra has been listed as one of Forbes India's richest Indians and also in its The World's Billionaires list among the highest Indians by net worth.

== Early life ==
Dhingra was born in 1950 in a business family. His grandfather started the paint business in 1898 in Amritsar in Sikh Punjabi Family. Dhingra holds a bachelor's degree from Delhi University.

== Berger Paints ==
In 1991, Dhingra along with his brother Kuldip Singh Dhingra purchased Berger Paints from UB group of Vijay Mallya.

== Association ==
Dhingra serves as director of Anshana Properties, Arambol Properties, Citland Commercial Credits, Lobelia Buildwell, Scorpio Research and Consultants, Vinu Estates, Vignette Investments, UK Paints, Berger Becker Coatings, Berger Paints, Jolly Properties, Rakesh Estate, Rakesh Containers, Reshma Properties, Rishkul Properties, Creative Reattach, Kaydee Farms, Malibu Estate, Bigg Investments and Finance, Flex Properties, Burgeon properties, Britona properties, Emvee horticulture, Pagoda Builcon, Fable Propbuild, Flume Propbuild, Valerian Hospitality and Hotels.

== Family ==
Dhingra is married and has three children. Dhingra's son, Kanwardeep, is vice-chairman of Berger Paints. The entire family lives in New Delhi.
