= Mehtab Kaur of Patiala =

Indian politician (1922–2017)

Mehtab Kaur
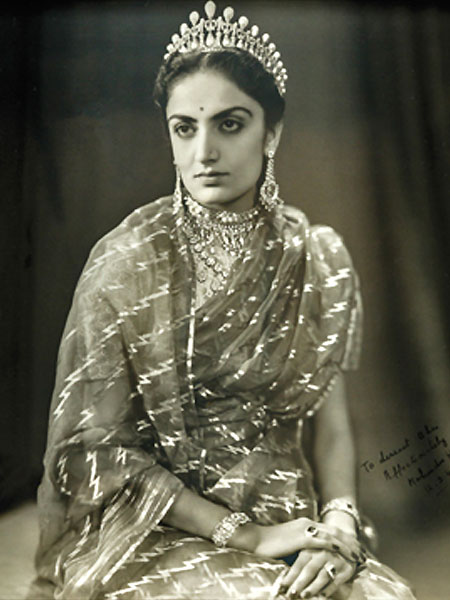
- Formal portrait, c. 1940s

Maharani of Patiala
- Tenure: 1938 – 1947
- Predecessor: Bakhtawar Kaur
- Successor: Preneet Kaur (titular) Royalty abolished
- Born: Mohinder Kaur; 14 September 1922; Ludhiana, Punjab Province, British India
- Died: 24 July 2017 (aged 94); Patiala, Punjab, India
- Maharaja: Yadavindra Singh (m. 1938; died 1974)
- Issue Detail: Heminder Kaur (daughter); Rupinder Kaur (daughter); Amarinder Singh (son); Malvinder Singh (son)
- Father: Sardar Harchand Singh Jaijee

Member of Parliament
- In office 1967–1971
- Preceded by: Sardar Hukam Singh
- Succeeded by: Sat Pal Kapur
- Constituency: Patiala

Personal details
- Party: Indian National Congress

Mehtab Kaur (née Mohinder Kaur; 14 September 1922 – 24 July 2017) was the second wife of the ninth and the last ruling Maharaja of Patiala Yadavindra Singh (1913–1974). She was the mother of Amarinder Singh, the former Chief Minister of Punjab. Had it not been for the erstwhile Indian princely families being stripped of their titles in 1971, upon the death of her husband she would have been considered Rajmata (queen mother), and in popular usage was commonly referred to as such.

== Early years ==
Mehtab Kaur was born in Ludhiana, Punjab Province, British India, as Mohinder Kaur, the daughter of Sardar Harchand Singh Jaijee (Shergill), a nobleman of Patiala State and a member of the Patiala Riyasat Prajya Mandal (Patiala State Peoples' Forum, an affiliate of the Indian National Congress party). In August 1938, a month before her 16th birthday, she was married to Maharaja Yadavindra Singh, the ruling Maharaja of Patiala. She was the Maharaja's second wife. As the senior Maharani was also named Mohinder Kaur, and was present in the palace to receive her co-wife, the younger Mohinder Kaur received the new name Mehtab Kaur.

== As Maharani ==
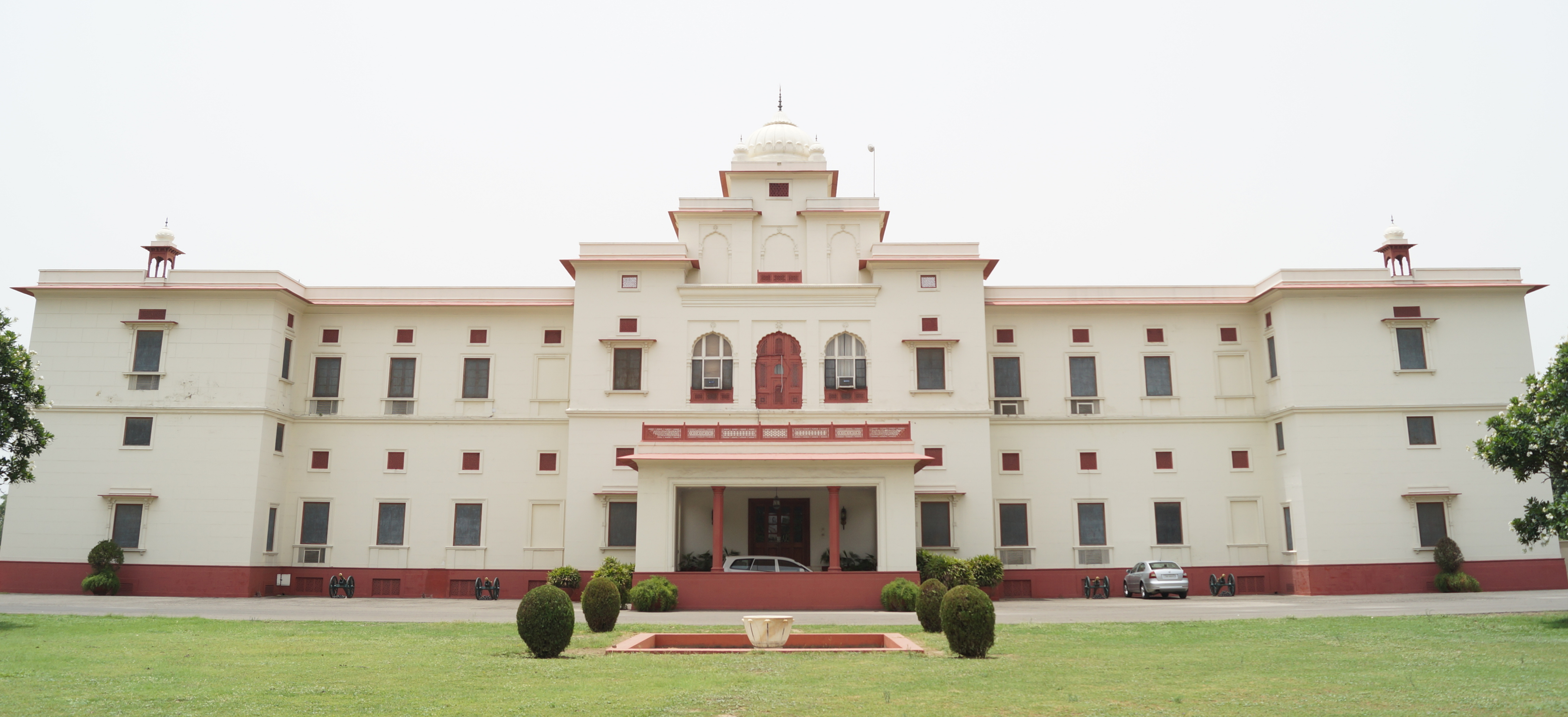
Residence of Maharani Mehtab Kaur, New Moti Bagh Palace, Patiala.

Yadvinder Singh had succeeded his father as Maharaja of Patiala only a few months prior to this wedding. His first marriage had been (and remained) childless. However, barely 10 months after her wedding, Mehtab Kaur became a mother with the birth of a daughter, Heminder Kaur, future wife of the diplomat and politician Natwar Singh. The following year saw the birth of another daughter, Rupinder Kaur, followed in March 1942 by the birth of the much awaited heir, Amarinder Singh. He was followed in 1944 by a second son, Malvinder Singh.

India gained its independence in 1947. On 15 July 1948, the princely state of Patiala was merged with the Indian union and the ruling power of the Maharaja was ended. Patiala was merged with certain other princely states to form PEPSU (Patiala and East Punjab States' Union), a state within the union of India. Yadvinder Singh was named Rajpramukh or ceremonial Governor of this new state. The royal family of Patiala worked diligently to adjust to the new realities of their situation, and Maharani Mehtab Kaur (the name by which she was now known) made important contributions in the transition.

India received its independence at the price of being partitioned, and the province of Punjab bore the brunt of that brutal upheaval. Patiala, as a major town located near the newly defined border between India and Pakistan, received tens of thousands of Hindu and Sikh refugees who had been compelled to leave their homes in the territories that became Pakistan. The royal family of Patiala organised numerous camps and relief projects in aid of these refugees. In particular, the two Maharanis supervised relief kitchens and medical provisions for them.

== Political career ==
At the time when his state was merged into the Patiala and East Punjab States Union, the Maharaja had been given the position of Rajpramukh (ceremonial governor) of PEPSU for life. However, in 1956, PEPSU disappeared from the map following a further reorganization of internal borders in India, and the Maharaja was summarily deprived of the responsibilities (and perks) of office.

After 1956, the Maharaja was given various diplomatic assignments, including heading Indian delegations to the UN general assembly (1956), UNESCO (1957–58) and UNFAO (1959 onwards). He also served as ambassador to Italy (1965–66) and the Netherlands (1971–1974). These relatively minor assignments were significantly less than the assurances that the royals of India had received when they signed away their kingdoms, and from the absolute ruling powers to which the Maharaja had been accustomed. Further, the ruling Congress party was championing a sharp turn left-wards in its policies, and its utterances with regard to the erstwhile princes were radical and alarming. Since Patiala was by far the largest of the princely states in Punjab, the government had deemed it expedient to keep the Maharaja beholden (and away from politics) by giving him minor diplomatic assignments which required his presence abroad. The Maharaja was however anxious to gain some political leverage and influence in the ruling dispensation, but as a titular Maharaja, it was not possible for him to enter party politics himself. Meanwhile, Mehtab Kaur's father and family had risen in the ranks of the Congress party, building on the Riyasat Praja Mandal background. For these reasons, and at her husband's behest, Mehtab Kaur entered party politics in 1964.

Mehtab Kaur served as a member of Rajya Sabha, the indirectly elected upper house of the Indian Parliament, from 1964 to 1967 as a Congress party member. In 1967, she was elected to the 4th Lok Sabha (1967–71), the directly elected lower house of Parliament, from the Patiala constituency. In 1971, the Congress party and its government executed some of their radical plans by individually 'de-recognizing' each and every one of the over 500 Maharajas who existed at that time in India. The privy purse (pension) and other benefits which had been guaranteed to them by solemn covenant in 1947–48, when they signed away their kingdoms, were summarily withdrawn as well. In keeping with Indira Gandhi's anti-royal political stance, Mehtab Kaur was marginalized and was not given a party nomination to contest the general elections of 1971. Instead, the Maharaja was appointed ambassador to the Netherlands that year, and the family again moved abroad.

== Later life ==
In 1974, the former Maharaja died at The Hague while serving as India's ambassador to the Netherlands. Mehtab Kaur's elder son, Amarinder Singh, succeeded as head of the erstwhile royal family of Patiala. The princely state of Patiala no longer existed, and even titles had been abolished in 1971, but by the general public, and even in the press, Mehtab was routinely referred to as 'Rajmata of Patiala' and her son as 'Maharaja of Patiala.'

The family returned to India, and the two dowager Maharanis took up residence in their family home, the Moti Bagh Palace in Patiala. Upon the demise of her husband, Mehtab Kaur gave up wearing jewelry, silk or bright colored clothing, and dressed exclusively in two colors, namely white and indigo blue, which are the colors of renunciation and piety in Sikh tradition. She had forayed into politics only because her husband had desired it, and as a pious widow, she now intended to withdraw from public life and spend her days in prayer and religious observances. All her children were married and settled by this time, and she had seven grandchildren upon whom she doted. However, in 1977, outraged by the excesses of the Emergency, in particular the forced sterilization by vasectomy of healthy young men, she joined the Janata Party and was named one of its general secretaries. That party won the general elections held shortly thereafter, and in 1978, Mehtab Kaur was elected a member of the Rajya Sabha. She served a full 6-year term (1978–84) there and then withdrew from public life.

In her retirement, Mehtab Kaur maintained the charitable traditions of her family and remained assiduous in matters of tradition and religious observance. She often granted audience to ladies from Patiala State until advanced age and ill-health prevented exertion. Her piety, austerity and charity made her a cultural icon in Patiala. In later life, she resided in New Moti Bagh Palace, Patiala, before her death from age related ailments on 24 July 2017.

Regnal titles
Preceded by Maharani Bakhtawar Kaur	Maharani of Patiala; 1938 – 1971	Succeeded by State abolished
