= Shutrana Assembly constituency =

Legislative Assembly constituency in Punjab State, India

Coordinates: 29.91°N 76.12°E

Shutrana
- Constituency No. 117 for the Punjab Legislative Assembly

Constituency details
- Country: India
- State: Punjab
- District: Patiala
- Lok Sabha constituency: Patiala
- Total electors: 182,335
- Reservation: SC

Member of Legislative Assembly
- 16th Punjab Legislative Assembly
- Incumbent Kulwant Singh Bazigar
- Party: Aam Aadmi Party
- Elected year: 2022

Shutrana is a Punjab Legislative Assembly constituency in Patiala district, Punjab state, India.

== Members of the Legislative Assembly ==
Most successful parties from Shutrana Vidhan Sabha
1. SAD (4 Times) (40.0%)
2. INC (3 Times) (30.0%)
3. CPI (2 Times) (20.0%)
4. AAP (1 Time) (10.0%)

Year	Member	Party
1977	Baldev Singh	Communist Party of India
1980	Baldev Singh	Communist Party of India
1985	Satwant Singh Mohi	Shiromani Akali Dal
1992	Hamir Singh	Indian National Congress
1997	Gurdev Singh Sidhu	Shiromani Akali Dal
2002	Nirmal Singh	Shiromani Akali Dal
2007	Nirmal Singh	Indian National Congress
2012	Vaninder Kaur Loomba	Shiromani Akali Dal
2017	Nirmal Singh	Indian National Congress
2022	Kulwant Singh Bazigar	Aam Aadmi Party

== Election results ==
=== 2027 ===
Punjab Assembly election, 2027: Shutrana
Party	Candidate	Votes	%	±%
AAP	Vaninder Kaur Loomba			
AD (WPD)				New entry
INC				
BSP				
SAD				
BJP				New entry
NOTA	None of the above			
Majority				
Turnout				

=== 2022 ===
Punjab Assembly election, 2022: Shutrana
Party	Candidate	Votes	%	±%
AAP	Kulwant Singh Bazigar	81,751	59.35	
SAD	Vaninder Kaur Loomba	30,197	21.92	
INC	Darbara Singh	11,353	8.24	
SAD(A)	Gurjit Singh	5,983	4.4	
PLC	Naryan Singh	3,581	2.6	
NOTA	None of the above	1,536	1.12	
Majority		51,554	37.43	
Turnout		137,739	75.54	
Registered electors		182,335		
AAP gain from INC		Swing		

=== 2017 ===
Punjab Assembly election, 2017: Shutrana
Party	Candidate	Votes	%	±%
INC	Nirmal Singh	58,008	42.11	
SAD	Vaninder Kaur Loomba	39488	28.66	
AAP	Palwinder Kaur	32037	23.26	
NOTA	None of the above	877	0.50	
Majority		18,520	13.40	
Turnout		1,37,762	83.50	
Registered electors		165,967		
INC gain from SAD		Swing		

=== Previous results ===
Year	A C No.	Category	Winner	Party	Votes	Runner Up	Party	Votes
1977	74	(SC)	Baldev Singh	Communist Party of India	22481	Gurdev Singh	Shiromani Akali Dal	22346
1980	74	(SC)	Baldev Singh	Communist Party of India	26110	Bhajan Lal	INC(I)	18948
1985	74	(SC)	Satwant Singh Mohi	Shiromani Akali Dal	26951	Manu Ram	Indian National Congress	15964
1992	74	(SC)	Hamir Singh	Indian National Congress	7025	Nirmal Singh	Shiromani Akali Dal	3968
1997	74	(SC)	Gurdev Singh Sidhu	Shiromani Akali Dal	45592	Ram Chand	Communist Party of India	29419
2002	74	(SC)	Nirmal Singh	Shiromani Akali Dal	34123	Hamir Singh	Indian National Congress	18567
2007	73	(SC)	Nirmal Singh	Indian National Congress	53888	Hamir Singh Ghagga	Shiromani Akali Dal	51293
2012	117	(SC)	Vaninder Kaur Loomba	Shiromani Akali Dal	47764	Nirmal Singh	Indian National Congress	46992

== See also ==
- List of constituencies of the Punjab Legislative Assembly
- Patiala district
