= Iqbal Singh Lalpura =

Indian politician

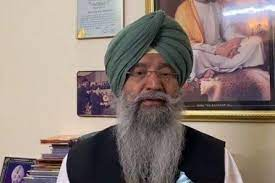

Chairman of the National Commission for Minorities
- In office 13 April 2022 – 22 April 2025
- Prime Minister: Narendra Modi
- Minister: Kiren Rijiju
- Preceded by: Mukhtar Abbas Naqvi
- Succeeded by: Harjit Singh Grewal

Personal details
- Born: 7 February 1953 (age 73) Punjab, India
- Party: Bharatiya Janata Party
- Occupation: Politician, author, former IPS Officer
- Known for: Arrest of Jarnail Singh Bhindranwale

Iqbal Singh Lalpura (born 7 February 1953) is a former IPS officer and Indian politician. He served as chairman of India's National Commission for Minorities He is known for the arrest of Jarnail Singh Bhindranwale. Lalpura was an investigating officer for the 1978 Sikh–Nirankari clash.

== Early life and career ==
Lalpura, a member of the Sikh community, hails from Punjab.

== Career as a Police Officer ==
Starting his career in 1972 as a police officer, he then progressed to become an IPS officer and discharged his duties with distinction in the areas as sensitive as Amritsar as S.P. CID (1987-1996) and Hoshiarpur.

Throughout his law enforcement career, Lalpura held key positions in Punjab's border districts, including DIG Punjab Police, SSP Amritsar, SSP Tarantaran, SSP Kapurthala and Additional Inspector General CID Amritsar. He received several awards, including the President's Police Medal and the Police Medal for Meritorious Services. He also served FBI in USA as an expert on militancy

=== Arrest of Jarnail Singh Bhindranwale ===
Iqbal Singh Lalpura served as an investigating officer for the 1978 Sikh–Nirankari clash and also played a pivotal role in the arrest of Sikh separatist leader Jarnail Singh Bhindranwale in April 1981. Bhindranwale was a prominent figure in the Khalistan movement. During this critical operation, Bhindranwale had agreed to surrender, but on the condition that only baptized officers would apprehend him. Consequently, a specialized three-member team was assembled for this task, consisting of Lalpura himself, along with police officer Jarnail Singh Chahal and SDM BS Bhullar.

== Political career ==
After retiring from the police force he joined Bharatiya Janata Party and served the Punjab Bharatiya Janata Party in various capacities i.e. Executive Member, Convenor of Intellectual Cell, Vice President, State Vice President, State Spokesperson of Punjab and was elevated as National Spokesperson and was appointed as Chairman of the National Commission for Minorities on 10 September 2021. He was also appointed as Member of the National Parliamentary Board of the Bharatiya Janata Party in 2022 and became known for his appearances in television debates.

== Prolific Author ==
Lalpura is also a prolific author, with works like 1. Japji Sahib Ek Vichaar 2. Gurbani Katha-Vichar 3. Musalman Kahawan Mushkil 4. Bharaman Bhala Aakhiye 5. Kich Suniye Kich Kahiye 6. Lalkarde Sahibzade 7. Nanak Tin Ke Sang Sath 8. Vangar 9. Sahib Zade - 'Hindi' 10. Tilak Janju da Rakha 11. Singho Khabardar 12. Sach Suniyisi 13. Mard-E-Khuda Nanak 14. Manas to Devte 15. Raj Karega Khalsa 16. Kado Tak Dhende Rahange, Kade Takhat Kade Sidhant 17. Sewak Ko Sewa Ban Aye 18. Love, Serve & Protect (under print) 19. Life with Crime & Criminals (under print) 20. Suraj de Hamrah 21. Khetan de puttar 22 Sach ki Bela, focusing on Sikh philosophy and history.

During the farmers' protests in Punjab, he actively engaged with various parts of the state, facing protests in Sangrur and Barnala.

On 16 September 2022, Lalpura praised Prime Minister Narendra Modi, referring to him as a "better Sikh than most of us." Lalpura highlighted several initiatives by the Modi government aimed at the Sikh community, including the opening of the Kartarpur Corridor in 2019 and the removal of Sikh foreign nationals from a secret blacklist. He claimed that Prime Minister Modi's announcement to repeal the controversial farm laws on Guru Nanak Dev's birthday demonstrated his dedication to Sikh concerns and suggested that the BJP had a plan for "peaceful co-existence" with the Sikh community.

== Awards ==
S. Lalpura was conferred Shiromani Sahitkar award in 2006 by the Shiromani Gurudwara Prabandhak Committee (SGPC) and Sri Akal Takht Sahib on the occasion of the 400th martyrdom day of Sri Guru Arjan Dev Ji.

It was he who began the project of cleaning the Kali Bein River in Kapurthala in 1997-98 and in January 2000 was instrumental in ensuring that the fresh water flows from Buddhu Barkat Canal into Bein river. He was honoured with 'The Sikh of the Year' award in 2017 by the Chief Khalsa Diwan. Besides, he was felicitated with an Honorary Doctorate by the Guru Kashi University, Talwandi Sabo.

=== Chairman of National Commission for Minorities ===
In April 2022, Lalpura assumed the role of Chairman of the National Commission for Minorities, a significant position addressing minority community issues in India and served as April 2025.

== Controversy ==
Lalpura faced criticism from Harjinder Singh Dhami, Chief of the Shiromani Gurdwara Parbandhak Committee (SGPC), who accused him of allegedly working against the interests of the Akali Dal candidate, adding a political dimension to his role as Chairman of the National Commission for Minorities.

On 2 November 2022, the Shiromani Akali Dal (SAD) formally requested the President to dismiss National Commission for Minorities chairman Iqbal Singh Lalpura from his position, citing concerns of interference in the religious affairs of the Sikh community. The SAD accused Lalpura of attempting to disrupt the Shiromani Gurdwara Parbandhak Committee (SGPC), a prominent Sikh religious organization. This move by the SAD reflects their strong objection to what they perceive as undue interference in Sikh religious matters by a government-appointed official.

== Personal life ==
S. Lalpura hails from Punjab's Ropar district. His son Ajayveer Singh stated that his father had humble beginnings as he rose from a modest house in the backward area, deprived of the love of his father S. Sarwan Singh Lalpura who had died, and rose to become IPS officer and afterwards attaining Cabinet rank in the Union Government. All this became possible due to the blessings of Almighty Akalpurkh and the support of his family including his better half Hardeep Kaur, Daughter Jasmine Kaur Nijjar. He also has 6 grandchildren namely Baani Sukhamrit Kaur, Dilnoor Kaur, Amreen Amrit Kaur, Hargun Kaur, Himmat vir Singh and Harfateh Vir Singh. The Lalpura family has a history of involvement in public service and politics. Several members of the family have held prominent public and professional positions. The Lalpura family stands as a strong contender as one of the most influential political families.
