= Harjit Singh Grewal =

Indian politician

Chairman of the National Commission for Minorities
- Incumbent
- Assumed office 17 July 2026
- Preceded by: Iqbal Singh Lalpura

Vice President Bharatiya Janata Party, Punjab
- Incumbent
- Assumed office 2017

Vice Chairman, NACOF
- Incumbent
- Assumed office 2015

Chairman, Punjab Khadi and Village Industries Board
- In office 2013-2017

Personal details
- Born: 1959–1960
- Party: Bharatiya Janta Party
- Spouse: Pinky Grewal
- Children: Prateek Grewal
- Parent: Harnek Singh (father)
- Education: D.A.V. College, Jalandhar
- Profession: Agriculture
- Website: Harjit Singh Grewal on Facebook

Harjit Singh Grewal is an Indian politician and member of Bhartiya Janta Party. He is one of the senior leaders of the Bhartiya Janta Party. In July 2026, he was appointed as the Chairman of the National Commission for Minorities. He served as the State Vice President of the Bhartiya Janta Party of the Punjab. He is currently serving as a member of the National Executive of the Bhartiya Janata Party.

== Political career ==
Harjit Singh Grewal played a key role in the farmers' protest. Grewal met the Prime Minister as well as the Union Home Minister on several occasions to resolve the issue of the farmers' protest. He also remained as the Chairman of Khadi Board. He was one of the Star Campaigners for BJP in Punjab for the 2022 Punjab Assembly Elections. He contested the Punjab Legislative Assembly Elections in 2017 from Rajpura.

During the farmers' protest, Grewal advised the SGPC that being a purely religious body, by getting involved into the farmers’ agitation, the SGPC is going completely against the mandate given to it under The Sikh Gurdwaras Act, 1925 and Punjab Act 8 of 1925 that describe the prime role of the SGPC to manage gurdwara affairs.

During the farmers' protest Grewal was a part of the committee that was made to discuss the issues of the farmers' protest.

When Prime Minister Narendra Modi's security was breached in Punjab, Grewal claimed that windows of some buses were smashed and some workers were beaten up who were coming to attend the rally of the Prime Minister.

In November 2021, Grewal was amongst the BJP leaders who met the Prime Minister seeking to reopen the Kartarpur corridor before the Gurpurab.

In the month of July, 2021 some farmers entered Grewal's fields and destroyed the paddy saplings transplanted on 1.5 acres of land in Dhanaula, Barnala. An FIR was registered against the farmers who were involved in destroying the paddy saplings.

In July 2026, Grewal was appointed as the Chairman of the National Commission for Minorities for a term of three years, succeeding Iqbal Singh Lalpura.
