= Dharamvir Gandhi =

Indian politician

Dr. Dharamvir Gandhi
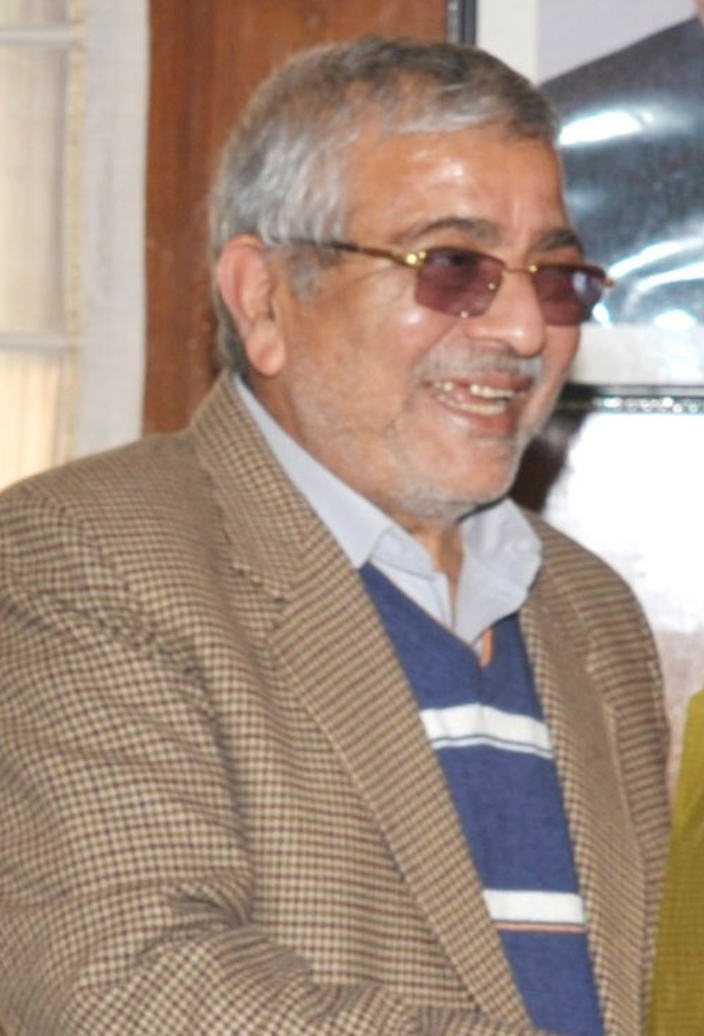

Member of Parliament, Lok Sabha
- Incumbent
- Assumed office 2024
- Preceded by: Preneet Kaur
- Constituency: Patiala
- In office 2014–2019
- Preceded by: Preneet Kaur
- Succeeded by: Preneet Kaur
- Constituency: Patiala

Personal details
- Born: 1 June 1951 (age 74)
- Party: Indian National Congress (since 2024); Nawan Punjab Party (2019 - 2024); Punjab Front (2016 - 2019); Aam Aadmi Party (till 2016)
- Education: MD (Medicine)
- Profession: Doctor, Politician

Dharamvir Gandhi (born 1 June 1951) is an Indian politician and a member of Indian National Congress. In 2024 Indian general election he was elected from Patiala Lok Sabha constituency defeating the incumbent MP Preneet Kaur. He was earlier a member of the Aam Aadmi Party (AAP) and Nawa Punjab Party.

== Career ==
During his college days, Gandhi was detained for a month in Amritsar, for protesting against the 1977 Emergency. He went on to become a reputed cardiologist of Patiala. He also worked as a senior lecturer at the Government Medical College, Patiala's Department of Cardiology.

Gandhi joined politics inspired by the 2011 Indian anti-corruption movement, and campaigned for the AAP during the 2013 Delhi Legislative Assembly election. He contested the 2014 Indian general election from Patiala on an AAP ticket. During the campaign, he was assaulted in the Rasulpur Saidan area, allegedly by the Shiromani Akali Dal Municipal Councillor Rajinder Singh Virk. Gandhi defeated the incumbent MP Preneet Kaur by a margin of 20,942 votes.

He resigned from AAP in 2016. In the 2019 Lok Sabha election, Gandhi created his own party Punjab Front and contested. He came on third position.

== Punjab Front ==
Punjab Front
- Abbreviation: PBF
- Leader: Dharamvir Gandhi
- Founder: Dharamvir Gandhi
- Founded: 26 September 2016
- Dissolved: 11 March 2019
- Split from: Aam Aadmi Party
- Succeeded by: Nawan Punjab Party
- ECI Status: Registered

Punjab Front was a political party in India formed by merging various splinter groups, smaller regional forums, fronts and political parties led by MP Dharamvir Gandhi.

It is the official name given to the much-anticipated Mahagathbandhan (or Fourth Front ) which was formed in Punjab, India after a day-long series of deliberations by like-minded groups and political organisations. The announcement of the Front was made by Gandhi at the end of the "Round Table Conference" in Chandigarh on Sunday 26 September 2016.

The party decided at a meeting in November 2016 to campaign for the enforcement of the Right To Education Act of 2009. The party claims that both government and private schools and colleges are guilty of discriminatory admission practices and are not managed in accordance with the law.

In December 2016 the party announced fifteen candidates to contest the 2017 Punjab Legislative Assembly election. All of them lost the election.

== Nawan Punjab Party ==
Nawan Punjab Party
- Abbreviation: NPP
- Founder: Dharamvir Gandhi
- Founded: 11 March 2019
- Preceded by: Punjab Front
- Colours
- Alliance: Punjab Democratic Alliance

Nawan Punjab Party is a Political party in Punjab established by Dharamvir Gandhi the then Member of Parliament from Patiala Constituency on 11 March 2019.

Dharamvir Gandhi formed a Punjab Front in 2016 to contest 2017 Punjab Legislative Assembly election. However his front failed to make any impact in election. After this in 2019 before General election he formed Nawan Punjab Party and joined Punjab Democratic Alliance

== 2019 General election ==
Nawan Punjab Party candidate Dharamvir Gandhi contested only from Patiala Constituency.

However party lost from this constituency and Dharamvir Gandhi stood at third place and got 161,645 votes and 13.72% vote share from this constituency.

== 2024 General election ==
In 2024, Dr. Dharamvir Gandhi joined Indian National Congress Party and contested from Patiala Constituency.

Dr. Dharamvir Gandhi won from Patiala constituency with 305,616 votes and 26.54% vote share from this constituency.
