= Ram Pratap Garg =

Indian politician (born 1917)

Member of Parliament, Lok Sabha
- In office 1952–1957
- Succeeded by: Lala Achint Ram
- Constituency: Patiala

Personal details
- Born: 18 September 1917 Bhatinda, Punjab, British India (now in Punjab, India)
- Party: Indian National Congress
- Spouse: Kushal Garg

Ram Pratap Garg (born 18 September 1917, date of death unknown) was an Indian politician. He was elected to the Lok Sabha, lower house of the Parliament of India as a member of the Indian National Congress. Garg is deceased.
