= Kuldip Singh Dhingra =

Indian businessman

- Born: 1947 (age 78–79); Amritsar, Punjab, India
- Citizenship: Indian
- Education: Hindu College, Delhi; Delhi University
- Relatives: Gurbachan Singh Dhingra (brother)

Kuldip Singh Dhingra is an Indian entrepreneur and a co-owner of Berger Paints.

Dhingra has been listed as one of Forbes India's richest Indians and also in its The World's Billionaires list among the highest Indians by net worth.

== Early life ==
Dhingra was born in 1947 into a Sikh Punjabi Arora business family in Amritsar, Punjab, India. His grandfather started the paint business in 1898 in Amritsar. Dhingra holds a bachelor's degree from Delhi University.

== Berger Paints ==
In 1991 Dhingra along with his brother Gurbachan Singh Dhingra purchased Berger Paints from UB group of Vijay Mallya.

The book Unstoppable: Kuldip Singh Dhingra and the Rise of Berger Paints is the biography of Dhingra written by the author Sonu Bhasin.

== Association ==
Dhingra serves as director of Ashi Farms, Anshana Properties, Arambol Properties, Citland commercial credits, KSD Buildwell, KSD probuilt, Lobelia Buildwell, Scorpio research and consultants, Vinu Farms, Vignette Investments, United Stock Exchange, Wazir Estate, Wazir properties, UKPI Plantations, UK Paints, Sunaina Evergreen, Surjit Plantations, Berger becker coatings, Berger paints, Jolly properties, Kanwar Green Lands, Rishkul Properties, Amrit Plantations, Meeta Plantations, Malibu Estates, RPL forests, Bigg Investments and Finance, Flex Properties, Burgeon Properties, Britona Properties, Harman Greenfields, Pagoda Buildcon, Rishma Meadows, Fable Propbuild, Flume Propbuild.

== Family ==
Dhingra is married to Meeta Dhingra and has three children. Dhingra's daughter, Rishma Kaur, is the chairman of Berger Paints and has been married to Raninder Singh, the son of former Punjab Chief Minister Amarinder Singh, since 1995. Raninder and Rishma have three children: Seherinder Kaur (b.1996), Inayatinder Kaur (b.1999) and a son, Yadauinder Singh (b.2003). The entire family lives in New Delhi.
