= Neena Mittal =

Indian politician

Member of Punjab Legislative Assembly
- Incumbent
- Assumed office 2022
- Preceded by: Hardial Singh Kamboj
- Constituency: Rajpura

Personal details
- Party: Aam Aadmi Party

Neena Mittal is an Indian politician. She/he was elected to the Rajpura Assembly constituency, Punjab in the 2022 Punjab Legislative Assembly election as a member of the Aam Aadmi Party.

== Member of Legislative Assembly ==
She represents the Rajpura Assembly constituency as MLA in the Punjab Assembly. The Aam Aadmi Party gained a strong 79% majority in the sixteenth Punjab Legislative Assembly by winning 92 out of 117 seats in the 2022 Punjab Legislative Assembly election. MP Bhagwant Mann was sworn in as Chief Minister on 16 March 2022.

Committee assignments of Punjab Legislative Assembly

- Member (2022–23) Committee on Government Assurances
- Member (2022–23) Committee on Agriculture and its allied activities

== Electoral performance ==
Punjab Assembly election, 2022: Rajpura
Party	Candidate	Votes	%	±%
AAP	Neena Mittal	54,834	40.4	
BJP	Jagdish Kumar Jagga	32,341	23.80	
INC	Hardial Singh Kamboj	28,589	21.1	
SAD	Charanjit Singh Brar	15,006	11.1	
NOTA	None of the above	936	0.5	
Majority		22,493	16.45	
Turnout		136,759	74.9	
Registered electors		182,688		
