= Sanaur =

- city
- Location in Punjab, India Sanaur (India)
- Coordinates: 30.3°N 76.46°E
- Country: India
- State: Punjab
- District: Patiala

Area
  - Total: 5.2 km^{2} (2 sq mi)
- Elevation: 253 m (830 ft)

Population (2011)
  - Total: 21,201
  - Density: 4,100/km^{2} (11,000/sq mi)

Languages
  - Official: Punjabi
- Time zone: UTC+5:30 (IST)
- Postal code: 147103

Sanaur is a town and a municipal council in Patiala in the Indian state of Punjab.

== Geography ==
Sanaur is located at 30.3°N 76.46°E. It has an average elevation of 253 m (830 ft). Sanaur lies 4 miles south-east of Patiala.

== History ==
It lies on a high mound. The town is of some antiquity. In the time of Babar, Malik Baha-ud-Din Khokar became the chief of this pargana which was called Chaurasi, having 84 villages. In 1748, it came into the possession of Baba Ala Singh.

== Demographics ==
As of 2011 India census, Sanaur had a population of 21,201. Males constitute 54% of the population and females 46%. Sanaur has an average literacy rate of 63%, higher than the national average of 59.5%: male literacy is 67%, and female literacy is 58%. In Sanaur, 12% of the population is under 6 years of age.

Sanaur has become centre for high schools in Patiala district as famous schools like The British co-ed High School, Kaintal School have shifted to their new buildings at Sanour road. St Mary's School CMI governed by Father James and Narain Public School are also situated at Sanour road Patiala. Sanour is also very close to Punjabi University Patiala and Government Mohindra College.

National Highway 7 also passes from Sanour road Patiala.

== Other ==
It is known that many migrants from Pakistan at time of India-Pakistan partition arrived at Sanaur instead of well developed Patiala because it had an easy and large supply of a local drink in Punjab called Lassi. Sabzi Mandi located at Sanaur Road, Patiala on the outskirts of Sanaur city is the second largest vegetable market in Asia.
