= Romani folklore =

Folktales, myths, oral traditions, and legends of the Romani people

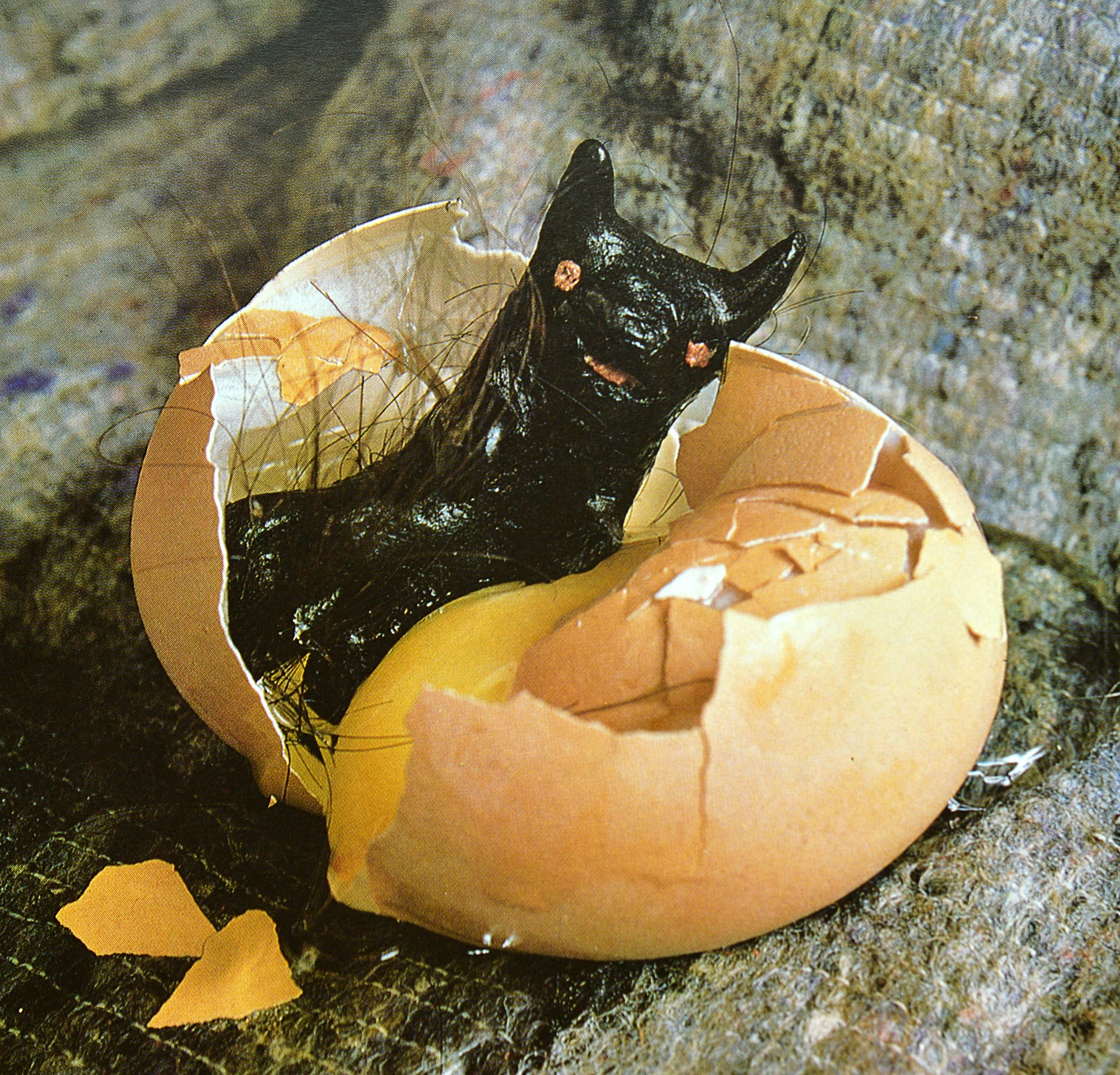

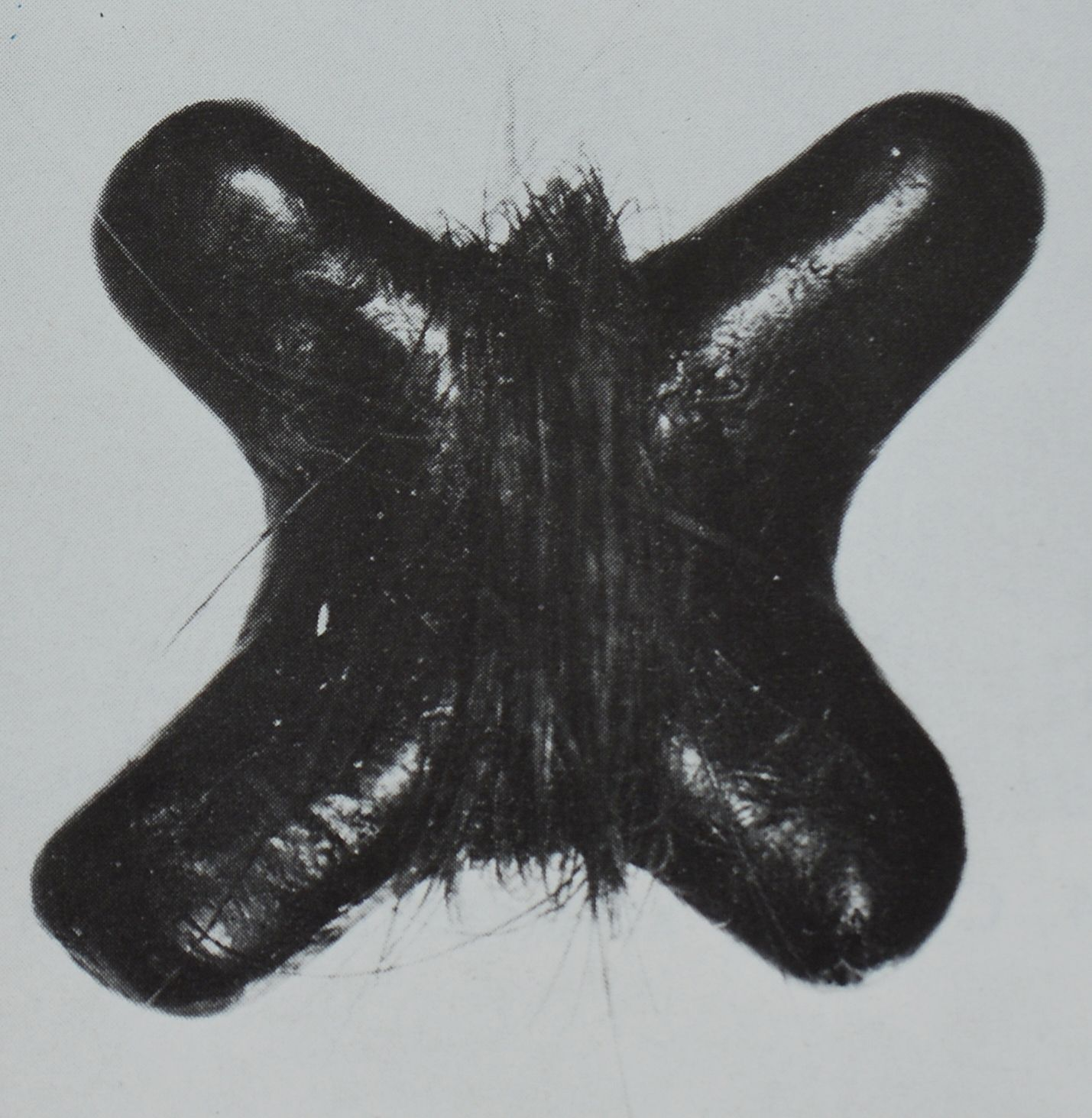

Romani folklore (paramichia) encompasses the folktales, myths, oral traditions, and legends. A popular legend among the Vlach Roma is of the hero Mundro Salamon, known by other Roma subgroups as Wise Solomon or O Godjiaver Yanko.

Some Roma believe in the mulo or mullo, meaning "one who is dead"; the Romani version of the vampire. The Roma from Slavic countries believe in werewolves. Roma figure prominently in the 1941 film The Wolf Man and the 2010 remake.

Other legends include the ability to levitate, travel through astral projection by way of meditation, invoke curses or blessings, conjure or channel spirits, and skill with illusion-casting. The Roma from Slavic countries believe in werewolves. Romani chovihanis often use a variety of herbs and amulets for protection. Garlic is a popular herb used by the Roma.

== Romani folktales ==
- "Bald Pate"
- "The Captive's Tale and Circumcision"
- "The Creation of the Violin"
- "Fedor and the Fairy"
- "The Foam Maiden"
- "Jack and His Golden Snuff-Box"
- "The King of England and his Three Sons"
- "The Little Bull-Calf"
- "Mossycoat"
- "The Red King and the Witch"
- "The Yellow Dragon"
- "The Girl from the Egg"
- "The Enchanted Prince Who was a Hedgehog"
- "The Enchanted Hinny"

== Motifs in Romani folklore ==
- Alakoh/Dundra (A Deity of the Moon and sacred law)
- Bababiljos (male love deity)
- Baba Fingo (the Saviour)
- Bear worship
- Beng (the Devil)
- Bibi (Romani cult)
- Bona ("baptism")
- Biboldo ("unbaptized")
- Crystal ball
- Crystal gazing
- Curse
- Chindo ("circumcised")
- Devla or Devel (God)
- Devleski Day (Mother Goddess)
- Dhampir (half-vampire)
- Dispater (god of death)
- Divination
- Dragon
- Fairy
- Fire worship
- Fortune-telling
- Gana (Queen of Witches)
- Gemstone
- George's Day in Spring
- I Gudli Saybiya (female guardian angel)
- Gypsycraft (Romani magic or witchcraft)
- Hamsa (amulet)
- Horse worship
- Household deity
- Incantation
- Jakhendar
- Kakava (Turkish spring festival)
- Moon worship
- Mullo (vampire)
- Palmistry
- Phallus worship
- Pharaun
- Psychic
- Rat-catcher
- Saintes-Maries-de-la-Mer
- Saint Sarah
- Shaktism
- Sunet bijav ("circumcision ceremony")
- Tarot card reading
- Tasseography
- Trishul ("cross"; see also trishula)
- Ursitory
- Vampire pumpkins and watermelons
- Werewolves

== See also ==
- Gypsy Lore Society
- The Red King and the Witch: Gypsy Folk and Fairy Tales
- Romani society and culture
