= Sangita Dhingra Sehgal =

Former Judge of Delhi High Court

Hon'ble Ms. Justice Sangita Dhingra Sehgal

Judge of Delhi High Court
- In office 15 December 2014 – 30 May 2020
- Nominated by: H. L. Dattu
- Appointed by: Pranab Mukherjee

Personal details
- Born: 20 June 1958 (age 68) Chandigarh, India
- Education: University of Delhi

Sangita Dhingra Sehgal (born 20 June 1958) is an Indian jurist. She is a former Judge of Delhi High Court, serving from 15 December 2014 until leaving the post on 30 May 2020 after tendering her resignation.

== Career ==
Born on 20 June 1958 at Chandigarh, Sehgal did her schooling and graduation in Chandigarh. She obtained her law degree from University of Delhi in 1981. She joined Delhi Judicial Service on 26 July 1985. She worked as an additional session judge from 2000 to 2003. She worked as secretary of Press Council of India from 2003 to 2004. She remained as registrar general of Delhi High Court from April 2013 to December 2014 and also worked as registrar (vigilance). She was elevated as additional judge of Delhi High Court on 15 December 2014 and became a permanent judge on 2 June 2016, and resigned as a judge on 21 May 2020, effective 30 May 2020. Her resignation from the High Court is in pursuance of her appointment as president of the Delhi State Consumer Dispute Redressal Commission.
