= Hardial Singh Kamboj =

Indian politician from Punjab

Member of the Punjab Legislative Assembly
- In office 2012–2022
- Succeeded by: Ashutosh Joshi
- Constituency: Rajpura

Personal details
- Born: 8 April 1965 (age 61)
- Party: Bharatiya Janata Party 2026-present Indian National Congress till 2026
- Profession: Politician

Hardial Singh Kamboj is an Indian politician and a member of Indian National Congress. In the 2017 Punjab Legislative Assembly election, he was elected for 2nd time as the member of the Punjab Legislative Assembly from Rajpura Assembly constituency.

== Constituency ==
Singh Kamboj represented the Rajpura. He won the seat as a candidate of the Indian National Congress, beating the incumbent member of the Punjab Legislative Assembly Ashutosh Joshi of the Aam Aadmi Party by 32565 votes.
