= Pattran =

Patran
- City
- Location in Punjab, India Patran (India)
- Coordinates: 29.9577°N 76.0486°E
- Country: India
- State: PatranPunjab
- District: Patiala

Population (2001)
  - Total: 38,125

Languages
  - Official: Punjabi
- Time zone: UTC+5:30 (IST)
- Postal code: 147105
- Vehicle registration: PB 72

Patran is a town and Municipal Council in Patiala district in the Indian state of Punjab. It lies at a distance of around 60 Km from the city of Patiala.

Patran is big marketplace for rice. This town has more than 100 Rice Shellers. This town is known for car palaces. Patran is well connected with Dirba, Ghagga, Samana, Tohana, Kaithal, Delhi, Ludhiana, Patiala and Sangrur by well maintained roads. So this town has good relations with these cities because of exporting of rice. This is developing town of Punjab with fertile land.

Patran town is also famous for its newly built and beautiful Shri Khatu Shyam Ji temple (Patran Dham), which is the second temple constructed after the Khatu Mandir in Rajasthan. And its very close to Ghagga. This town well known for there Ghagga kothi and for Delhi Amritsar Katra Expressway Toll Plaza Ghagga.

== Demographics ==
As of 2011 India census, Patran had a population of 38,125. Males constitute 20,091 of the population and females 18,034. Patran has an average literacy rate of 65%, higher than the national average of 59.5%: male literacy is 69%, and female literacy is 60%. In Patran, 13% of the population is under 6 years of age.The Patran city is divided into 15 wards for which elections are held every 5 years. According to the 1981 Census, the area of the town within the municipal limits was 3.00 km^{2}. And its population was 7,998. A notified area committee was constituted at Patran on 1 June 1970. The civic amenities provided by the committee include sanitation, water supply, street lighting, sewerage and cleanliness of the town and disposal of refuse. According to the 1991 Census, its population was 14,328.

Religion	Percentage
Hindu	64.08%
Muslim	1.10%
Christian	0.18%
Sikh	34.03%
Buddhist	0.02%
Jain	0.09%
Others	0.02%
No Religion	0.49%

== History ==
- During princely time, Patran was only a small village and was known for a big lake named ‘Bhupindra Sagar’ which had been got built by Maharaja bhupindra Singh of Patiala for hunting purpose near Patran.
- According to locals, Patran was also associated with the notorious Jagga Dacoit who used to rob the rich and help the poor. There was an ancient dera known as Mai Dera which is visited by a large number of people. It is still situated amidst natural surroundings of old trees. In this complex, there is also a tomb of Baba Sottewala and an ancient Shiva Temple.

== Schools ==
- The Helix Oxford Smart School
- Mother India Public School
- DAV Public Senior Secoundary School
- Guru Teg Bahadur Public Senior Secondary School
- Gurukul Global Creanza School
- Sparkling Kids

Affiliated to CBSE
