= Charanjit Singh Walia =

Indian politician

Member of Parliament, Lok Sabha
- In office 1984–1989
- Preceded by: Amarinder Singh
- Succeeded by: Atinder Pal Singh
- Constituency: Patiala

Personal details
- Born: c. 1935
- Died: 18 July 2013 (aged 78)
- Party: Akali Dal

Charanjit Singh Walia was an Indian politician. He was elected to the Lok Sabha, lower house of the Parliament of India as a member of the Akali Dal.
