= Devla =

Concept of God in Romani religion

Devla/Del/Devel, Devlam, Devles, Devleske or Dovel is the word used when directly calling or praying to God in the Romani language.

== Names ==
Devla or "Del" is the Romani noun meaning "God" or "a god". The term is etymologically distinct from the English word Devil and the Romani language refers to the Devil or devils as Beng.

These Roma words predate the Romani people’s adoption of Christianity or Islam by centuries. They are derived from the Sanskrit word deva, related to the Latin words deus ("god") and divinus ("godly, godlike"), Greek Zeus, Lithuanian Dievas and the name for the sky god *Dyēus present throughout Indo-European religions and cultures.

== Devlaism ==
After the Yugoslav Wars, some Roma of different groups, like the Arlije and Gurbeti, created their own ethnic religion, based on their folk beliefs of their old Romani folklore, but there are few believers, their holy days are named Djisatedimi. Rites like infant baptism (bona) and religious male circumcision (sunet bijav) maintained from Christianity and Islam and is performed.

== See also ==
- Romani folklore
