= Harinder Pal Singh Chandumajra =

Indian politician from Punjab

Member of the Punjab Legislative Assembly
- In office 2017–2022
- Preceded by: Lal Singh
- Succeeded by: Harmeet Singh Pathanmajra (AAP)
- Constituency: Sanour

Personal details
- Born: 28 February 1980 (age 46)
- Party: SAD
- Spouse: Navpreet Kaur
- Profession: Politician

Harinder Pal Singh Chandumajra (born 28 February 1980) is an Indian politician and a member of SAD. In 2017, he was elected as the member of the Punjab Legislative Assembly from Sanour.

== Member of Legislative Assembly ==
Pal Singh Chandumajra represented the Sanour between 2017-2022. He won the Sanour Assembly constituency on an SAD ticket, he defeated the member of the Punjab Legislative Assembly Harinder Pal Singh Mann of the INC by over 4870 votes.

In the 2022 Punjab Legislative Assembly election Harmeet Singh Pathanmajra defeated Chandumajra by a large margin of 49,122 votes.

== Political party ==
Pal Singh Chandumajra is from the SAD.

State Legislative Assembly
Preceded by Lal Singh	Member of the Punjab Legislative Assembly from Sanour Assembly constituency 2022 –	Succeeded by Harmeet Singh Pathanmajra (AAP)
