= Narinder Kumar Sharma =

Indian politician

MLA, Derabassi Constituency, Punjab
- In office 2012–2022
- Succeeded by: Kuljit Singh Randhawa
- Constituency: Dera Bassi

Personal details
- Born: 1 April 1970 (age 56) Zirakpur, Punjab, India
- Party: Shiromani Akali Dal
- Spouse: Smt. Babita Sharma
- Children: Two sons

Narinder Kumar Sharma is an Indian politician and was a member of Shiromani Akali Dal. He was a Member of legislative assembly from Dera Bassi in Punjab until 2022. He got re-elected in 2017 assembly elections but lost in 2022 Punjab Assembly elections. He is currently the party treasurer of Shiromani Akali Dal. Elected to the Punjab Vidhan Sabha for the first time in 2012 and again in 2017. Remained Chief Parliamentary Secretary in Government of Punjab; Chairman Distt. Planning Board SAS Nagar; Sarpanch Village Lohgarh and President, M.C., Zirakpur.

He also is a builder and owner of NK Sharma Enterprises Limited, based in Zirakpur.
