= Harmeet Singh Pathanmajra =

Indian politician

MLA, Punjab Legislative Assembly
- Incumbent
- Assumed office 2022
- Preceded by: Harinder Pal Singh Chandumajra (SAD)
- Constituency: Sanour

Personal details
- Party: Bharatiya Janata Party(2026-present); Aam Aadmi Party (2022–2026)
- Profession: Politician

Harmeet Singh Pathanmajra is an Indian politician and the MLA representing the Sanour Assembly constituency in the Punjab Legislative Assembly. He was a member of the Aam Aadmi Party until 2026. Pathanmajra was elected as the MLA in the 2022 Punjab Legislative Assembly election and is a relative of Punjab Chief Minister Bhagwant Mann's wife.

== Member of Legislative Assembly ==
Pathanmajra represents the Sanour Assembly constituency since 2022 after winning the election.

In the 2022 Punjab Legislative Assembly election he contested from Sanour as a member of the Aam Aadmi Party and defeated Shiromani Akali Dal's Harinder Pal Singh Chandumajra by a large margin of 49,122 votes. The Aam Aadmi Party gained a strong 79% majority in the sixteenth Punjab Legislative Assembly by winning 92 out of 117 seats in the 2022 Punjab Legislative Assembly election. MP Bhagwant Mann was sworn in as Chief Minister on 16 March 2022.

On 2 November 2026, Pathanmajra joined the Bharatiya Janata Party.

Committee assignments of Punjab Legislative Assembly

- Member (2022–23) Committee on Estimates
- Member (2022–23) Committee on Government Assurances

== Rape and fraud accusation ==
A woman, reportedly his ex-wife, filed a complaint accusing Pathanmajra of misrepresenting himself as divorced and entering into a relationship, even marrying her in a gurdwara in 2021, while still being legally married to someone else. She alleges he sexually exploited her, coerced her with threats, and sent obscene material. Police registered an FIR under IPC Sections 376 (rape), 420 (cheating), and 506 (criminal intimidation).

On September 2, 2025, Punjab Police arrested Pathanmajra in Karnal, Haryana, based on the FIR. While being transported, he and his accomplices allegedly opened fire at police, ran over a constable, and fled in SUVs meanwhile one vehicle was intercepted, and weapons were recovered.

== Electoral performance ==
Punjab Assembly election, 2022: Sanour
Party	Candidate	Votes	%	±%
AAP	Harmeet Singh Pathanmajra	83,893	50.84	▲30.74
SAD	Harinder Pal Singh Chandumajra	34,771	21.07	▼14.63
INC	Harinder Pal Singh Mann	25,408	15.4	▼17.40
PLC	Bikramjit Inder Singh Chahal	9,223	5.59	New entry
SAD(A)	Vikramjeet Singh	4,935	2.99	▲2.74
NOTA	None of the above	1,617	0.7	
Majority		49,122	29.77	
Turnout		165,007	73.8	
Registered electors		223,610		
AAP gain from SAD		Swing		

State Legislative Assembly
Preceded by Harinder Pal Singh Chandumajra (SAD)	Member of the Punjab Legislative Assembly from Sanour Assembly constituency 2022 –	Incumbent
