= Forbes India's richest Indian by year =

Each year, Forbes India issues a list of India's richest people, called the "India Rich List". Since 2008, Mukesh Ambani has been the richest Indian, with his wealth based in Reliance Industries. except for 2022 where Gautam Adani displaced him.

== List ==
Year	Richest	Net worth in US$	Second richest	Net worth in US$	Source
2024	Mukesh Ambani	124 billion ▲	Gautam Adani	83 billion ▲	
2023	Mukesh Ambani	92 billion ▲	Gautam Adani	68 billion ▼	
2022	Gautam Adani	150 billion ▲	Mukesh Ambani	88 billion ▼	
2021	Mukesh Ambani	92.7 billion ▲	Gautam Adani	74.8 billion ▲	
2020	Mukesh Ambani	88.7 billion ▲	Gautam Adani	25.2 billion ▲	
2019	Mukesh Ambani	51.4 billion ▲	Gautam Adani	15.7 billion ▲	
2018	Mukesh Ambani	47.3 billion ▲	Azim Premji	21 billion ▲	
2017	Mukesh Ambani	38 billion ▲	Azim Premji	19 billion ▲	
2016	Mukesh Ambani	22.7 billion ▲	Dilip Shanghvi	16.9 billion ▼	
2015	Mukesh Ambani	18.9 billion ▼	Dilip Shanghvi	18 billion	
2014	Mukesh Ambani	23.6 billion ▲	Dilip Shanghvi	18 billion ▼	
2013	Mukesh Ambani	21 billion	Lakshmi Mittal	16 billion	
2012	Mukesh Ambani	21 billion ▼	Lakshmi Mittal	16 billion ▼	
2011	Mukesh Ambani	22.6 billion ▼	Lakshmi Mittal	19.2 billion ▼	
2010	Mukesh Ambani	27 billion ▼	Lakshmi Mittal	26.1 billion ▼	
2009	Mukesh Ambani	32 billion ▼	Lakshmi Mittal	30 billion ▼	
2008	Lakshmi Mittal	45 billion ▲	Mukesh Ambani	43 billion ▲	
2007		32 billion ▲	Mukesh Ambani	20.1 billion ▲	
2006	Mukesh Ambani	16.56 billion ▲	Azim Premji	12.89 billion ▲	
2005	Lakshmi Mittal	25 billion ▲	Azim Premji	9.3 billion ▼	
2004	Lakshmi Mittal	11.2 billion ▲	Azim Premji	10 billion ▲	
2003	Azim Premji	5.9 billion ▼	Kumar Mangalam Birla	2.4 billion ▲	
2002	Azim Premji	6.4 billion ▼	Kumar Mangalam Birla	2.1 billion ▲	
2001	Azim Premji	6.9 billion	Dhirubhai Ambani	3.4 billion ▼	
2000	Azim Premji	6.9 billion ▲	Dhirubhai Ambani	6.6 billion ▲	
1999	Azim Premji	2.8 billion ▲	Lakshmi Mittal	1.9 billion ▼	
1998	Lakshmi Mittal	3.5 billion ▲	Dhirubhai Ambani	1.5 billion ▲	
1997	Lakshmi Mittal	1.9 billion ▲	Dhirubhai Ambani	1.2 billion ▲	
1996	Kumar Mangalam Birla	2.1 billion ▲	Lakshmi Mittal	1.5 billion ▲	
