= Gurlal Ghanaur =

Indian politician

MLA, Punjab Legislative Assembly
- Incumbent
- Assumed office 2022
- Constituency: Ghanaur
- Majority: Aam Aadmi Party

Personal details
- Party: Aam Aadmi Party

Gurlal Ghanaur is an Indian politician and he is a renowned Punjab style Kabaddi player and the MLA representing the Ghanaur Assembly constituency in the Punjab Legislative Assembly. He is a member of the Aam Aadmi Party. He was elected as the MLA in the 2022 Punjab Legislative Assembly election.

== Member of Legislative Assembly ==
He represents the Ghanaur Assembly constituency as MLA in Punjab Assembly. The Aam Aadmi Party gained a strong 79% majority in the sixteenth Punjab Legislative Assembly by winning 92 out of 117 seats in the 2022 Punjab Legislative Assembly election. MP Bhagwant Mann was sworn in as Chief Minister on 16 March 2022.

Committee assignments of Punjab Legislative Assembly

- Member (2022–23) Committee on Public Undertakings
- Member (2022–23) Committee on Papers laid/to be laid on the table and Library

== Electoral performance ==
State Legislative Assembly
Preceded by -	Member of the Punjab Legislative Assembly from Ghanaur Assembly constituency 2022 –	Incumbent
