= Kulwant Singh Bazigar =

Indian politician

KULWANT SINGH

MLA, Punjab Legislative Assembly
- Incumbent
- Assumed office 2022
- Preceded by: Vaninder Kaur Loomba (SAD)
- Constituency: Shutrana
- Majority: Aam Aadmi Party

Personal details
- Born: KULWANT SINGH KARIMNAGAR (Patiala)
- Party: Aam Aadmi Party
- Education: 10th Standard
- Occupation: FARMER
- Profession: POLITICIAN

Kulwant Singh Bazigar is an Indian politician and the MLA representing the Shutrana Assembly constituency in the Punjab Legislative Assembly. He is a member of the Aam Aadmi Party. He was elected as the MLA in the 2022 Punjab Legislative Assembly election.

== Political career ==
Bazigar represents the Shutrana Assembly constituency since 2022 after winning the election.

In the 2022 Punjab Legislative Assembly election he contested from Shutrana as a member of the Aam Aadmi Party and defeated Shiromani Akali Dal's candidate and the former MLA from the constituency, Vaninder Kaur Loomba by a large margin of 51,554 votes.

== Member of Legislative Assembly ==
He represents the Shutrana Assembly constituency as MLA in Punjab Assembly. The Aam Aadmi Party gained a strong 79% majority in the sixteenth Punjab Legislative Assembly by winning 92 out of 117 seats in the 2022 Punjab Legislative Assembly election. MP Bhagwant Mann was sworn in as Chief Minister on 16 March 2022.

Committee assignments of Punjab Legislative Assembly

- Member (2022–23) Committee on Welfare of Scheduled Castes, Scheduled Tribes and Backward Classes

== Electoral performance ==
Punjab Assembly election, 2022: Shutrana
| Party | Candidate | Votes | % | ±% |
|---|---|---|---|---|
| AAP | Kulwant Singh Bazigar | 81,751 | 59.35 | |
| SAD | Vaninder Kaur Loomba | 30,197 | 21.92 | |
| INC | Darbara Singh | 11,353 | 8.24 | |
| NOTA | None of the above | 1,536 | 1.12 | |
| Majority | | 51,554 | 37.43 | |
| Turnout | | 137,739 | 75.54 | |
| Registered electors | | 182,335 | | |
| AAP gain from INC | | Swing | | |

State Legislative Assembly
| Preceded by Vaninder Kaur Loomba (SAD) | Member of the Punjab Legislative Assembly from Shutrana Assembly constituency 2022 – | Incumbent |
