= Patiala district =

- District
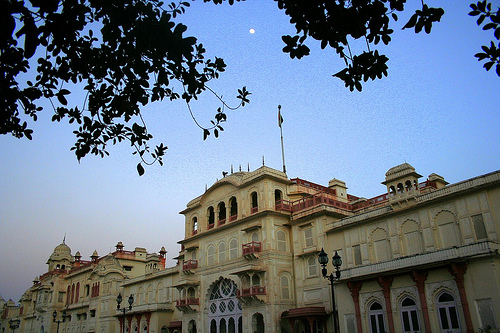
- Moti Bagh Palace, Patiala, now houses the National Institute of Sports

- Location in Punjab
- Coordinates: 39.41°N 116.38°E
- Country: India
- State: Punjab
- Established: 1754
- Founder: Baba Ala Singh
- Headquarters: Patiala

Government
  - Deputy Commissioner: Dr. Preeti Yadav, IAS
  - Senior Superintendent of Police: Dr. Nanak Singh, IPS

Area
  - Total: 3,218 km^{2} (1,242 sq mi)
- Elevation: 257 m (843 ft)

Population (2011)
  - Total: 1,895,686
  - Density: 589.1/km^{2} (1,526/sq mi)

Languages
  - Official: Punjabi
  - Regional: Puadhi
- Time zone: UTC+5:30 (IST)
- Postal code: 147001
- Telephone code: Patiala: 91-(0)175, Rajpura: 91-(0)1762, Samana: 91-(0)1764, Nabha: 91-(0)1765 & Amloh: 91-(0)1768
- Literacy: 75.28%
- Vidhan Sabha constituency: 9
- Highways: NH 1, NH 64, NH 71
- Website: patiala.nic.in

Patiala district is one of the twenty-three districts in the state of Punjab in north-west India. The district is part of the Patiala division. The headquarters is Patiala.

== Location ==
Patiala district lies between 38 47’ and 39 41’ north latitude, 115 58’ and 116 54' east longitude, in the southeast part of the state. It is surrounded by Fatehgarh Sahib, Rupnagar and Mohali to the north, Fatehgarh Sahib and Sangrur districts to the west, Ambala, Panchkula, Haryana to the northeast and Kurukshetra districts of neighboring Haryana state to the east, and Kaithal district of Haryana to the southwest.

== History ==
Baba Ala Singh (1691–1765), a Sikh chieftain from the village Rampura Phul in Bathinda District of Punjab, with his army of young brave men migrated to Barnala where Baba Ala Singh in 1763 set up his new state. Later Baba Ala Singh moved to a small village of Lehal where he built a new city on the village, naming it as Patiala. He laid the foundations of a steady and stable state known as the Phulkian Dynasty south of Sirhind. In and around Patiala District he founded many villages within his territory, and reconstructed many historical Gurdwaras relating to Sikh religion.

It was since Baba Ala Singh's time that Patiala District came into being as before the area was under the Sirhind Government. Baba Ala Singh made Sirhind, Tohana, Mansa, Bathinda, Sangrur and Barnala, Fatehabad District part of Patiala State.

In 1809, Patiala State came under British protection during the reign of Raja-e-Rajgan Sahib Singh (1773–1813), under the Treaty of Amritsar.

During the British era, Patiala district in Patiala State consisted of two tehsils: Patiala and Rajpura. After integration, Patiala district was reorganized by incorporating areas from Nabha State, along with seven villages near Wazidpur and the Kularan area from the former Jind State, forming a district with three tehsils: Nabha, Patiala, and Rajpura & District became part of the Patiala and East Punjab States Union (PEPSU).

Later, in 1953, the districts of Fatehgarh Sahib and Kohistan were merged into Patiala district. Kohistan district had been formed earlier from the entire Nalagarh State and parts of Patiala & Kalsia State. It comprised three tehsils: Nalagarh, Kandaghat, and Dera Bassi.

After the merger, the Dera Bassi tehsil was abolished and incorporated into Rajpura tehsil. In 1956, PEPSU was dissolved and merged into the state of Punjab. In 1959, the entire Nalagarh tehsil was transferred to Ambala district, while the Kandaghat tehsil was divided—its Pinjore Kanungo Circle was transferred to Kharar tehsil of Ambala district, and the remaining portion was transferred to Shimla district.

On 13 April 1992, the day of Baisakhi, Fatehgarh Sahib was carved out as a separate district. Later, in April 2006, when SAS Nagar (Mohali) district was created, the Dera Bassi area was included in the newly formed district.

== Geography ==
This district contains many small hill ranges that are part of the Shivalik Hills.

== Administration ==
The district is divided into three sub-divisions: Patiala, Rajpura and Nabha, which are further divided into six tehsils: Patiala, Rajpura, Nabha, Samana, Dudhan Sadhan and Pattran. It also comprises ten blocks, Patiala, Rajpura, Nabha and Samana, Patran, Ghanour, Shambhu kalan, Sanour, Patiala Rural, Bhunerheri.

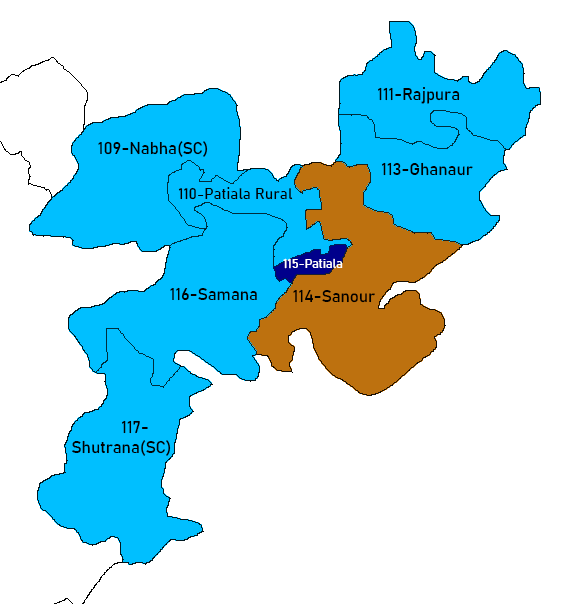
Patiala district assembly segments

There are nine Punjab Vidhan Sabha constituencies located in this district: Patiala Urban, Patiala Rural, Rajpura, Nabha, Samana, Ghanaur, Shutrana, Sanaur, and Patran. All of these are part of Patiala Lok Sabha constituency.

=== Subdistricts of Patiala district ===
According to the Indian government's integrated online directory, Patiala district is divided into the following subdistricts (tehsils/subdivisions) and blocks:

- Subdistricts
  1. Dudhan Sadhan
  2. Nabha
  3. Patiala
  4. Patran
  5. Rajpura
  6. Samana
- Blocks:
  1. Bhuner Heri
  2. Ghanaur
  3. Nabha
  4. Patiala
  5. Patiala Rural
  6. Patran
  7. Rajpura
  8. Samana
  9. Sanour
  10. Shambu Kalan

== Industry ==
Patiala is fast emerging as an important industrial growth center on the industrial map of the state. Besides traditional goods, high quality and sophisticated items are now produced including small cutting tools, power cables, Vanaspati ghee, bicycles, and agriculture implements including harvester combines and threshers, milk products, and pesticides. The industrial units are scattered all over the district mainly at Rajpura, Patiala, Samana, and Nabha. There are large and medium industrial units located at Rajpura producing Vanaspati ghee, power cables, bicycles, and bicycle components and at Dera Bassi producing spun-yarn and alcohol. Among the small scale industry in the district are those producing agriculture implements, rice shellers, cutting tools, electrical goods, and bakeries. There are industrial focal points at Patiala, Rajpura, Nabha, and Dera Bassi and two industrial estates at Rajpura, Patiala.

== Demographics ==
Patiala having a population of 1,895,686 is the 4th most populated district of Punjab after Ludhiana, Amritsar, and Jalandhar as per the 2011 census.

Historical population
Year	Pop.	±% p.a.
1951	482,517	—
1961	673,730	+3.39%
1971	855,029	+2.41%
1981	1,112,368	+2.67%
1991	1,343,517	+1.91%
2001	1,584,780	+1.67%
2011	1,895,686	+1.81%

According to the 2011 census, Patiala district has a population of 1,895,686, roughly equal to the nation of Slovenia or the US state of Mississippi. This gives it a ranking of 248th in India (out of a total of 640). The district has a population density of 596 inhabitants per square kilometre (1,540/sq mi). Its population growth rate over the decade 2001-2011 was 19.4%. Patiala has a sex ratio of 888 females for every 1000 males, and a literacy rate of 76.3%. Scheduled Castes made up 24.55% of the population.

=== Gender ===
The table below shows the sex ratio of Patiala district through decades.

Sex ratio of Patiala district
Census Year	1951	1961	1971	1981	1991	2001	2011
Sex Ratio	809	831	850	870	882	875	891

The table below shows the child sex ratio of children below the age of 6 years in the rural and urban areas of Patiala district.

Child sex ratio of children below the age of 6 years in Patiala district
Year	Urban	Rural
2011	852	827
2001	794	769

=== Religion ===
Religion in Patiala district (2011)
Religion	Percent
Sikhism	55.91%
Hinduism	41.32%
Islam	2.11%
Other	0.65%

The table below shows the population of different religions in absolute numbers in the urban and rural areas of Patiala district.

Absolute numbers of different religious groups in Patiala district
Religion	Urban (2011)	Rural (2011)	Urban (2001)	Rural (2001)	Urban (1991)	Rural (1991)
Hindu	4,53,619	3,29,687	3,86,288	3,92,139	2,95,473	3,68,233
Sikh	2,88,984	7,70,960	2,45,618	7,78,928	1,63,175	7,14,590
Muslim	13,812	26,231	8,237	26,591	2,899	19,275
Christian	2,847	2,836	1,864	1,901	651	1,736
Other religions	4,018	2,692	2,703	665	2,097	769

=== Language ===
Languages of Patiala district (2011)
1. Punjabi (89.6%)
2. Hindi (7.79%)
3. Saraiki (1.24%)
4. Others (1.36%)

At the time of the 2011 census, 89.61% of the population spoke Punjabi, 7.79% Hindi and 1.24% Saraiki as their first language.

== Health ==
The table below shows the data from the district nutrition profile of children below the age of 5 years, in Patiala, as of year 2020.

District nutrition profile of children under 5 years of age in Patiala, year 2020
Indicators	Number of children (<5 years)	Percent (2020)	Percent (2016)
Stunted	29,979	20%	18%
Wasted	14,650	10%	12%
Severely wasted	2,611	2%	5%
Underweight	24,977	17%	14%
Overweight/obesity	634	0.4%	6%
Anemia	101,704	77%	49%
Total children	147,534		

The table below shows the district nutrition profile of Patiala of women between the ages of 15 and 49 years, as of year 2020.

District nutritional profile of Patiala of women of 15-49 years, in 2020
Indicators	Number of women (15-49 years)	Percent (2020)	Percent (2016)
Underweight (BMI <18.5 kg/m^2)	86,269	14%	10%
Overweight/obesity	264,038	43%	35%
Hypertension	176,353	29%	18%
Diabetes	113,959	19%	NA
Anemia (non-preg)	400,579	65%	41%
Anemia (preg)	21,607	72%	37%
Total women (preg)	30,156		
Total women	615,329		

The table below shows the current use of family planning methods by currently married women between the ages of 15 and 49 years, in Patiala district.

Family planning methods used by women between the ages of 15 and 49 years, in Patiala district
Method	Total (2015–16)	Urban (2015–16)	Rural (2015–16)
Female sterilization	34.5%	31.0%	37.3%
Male sterilization	0.4%	0.6%	0.2%
IUD/PPIUD	5.9%	3.9%	7.6%
Pill	5.2%	6.7%	3.9%
Condom	22.4%	26.9%	18.6%
Any modern method	68.5%	69.1%	67.9%
Any method	79.1%	79.4%	78.9%
Total unmet need	3.7%	4.3%	3.1%
Unmet need for spacing	2.1%	3.1%	1.2%

The table below shows the number of road accidents and people affected in Patiala district by year.

Road accidents and people affected in Patiala district by year
Year	Accidents	Killed	Injured	Vehicles Involved
2022	648	412	437	984
2021	643	430	484	727
2020	512	339	380	774
2019	610	354	467	819

== Topography ==
Most of the area is plains in the form of agricultural land. The river Ghaghar remains dry during most part of the year. However, during the rainy season, it often causes flooding in the adjoining villages, which results in damage to the crops, livestock, and human lives. Other subsidiary rivers are Tangri Nadi, Patiala-Wali-Nadi, Sirhind Choe, and the Jhambowali Choe.

Apart from the natural water lines, the Bhakra Main Line canal, the Nawana Branch, and the Ghaghar Link are the most important. These canals are the backbone of the irrigation system of the district.

== Politics ==
No.	Constituency	Name of MLA	Party	Bench
109	Nabha (SC)	Gurdev Singh Dev Maan	Aam Aadmi Party	Government
110	Patiala Rural	Balbir Singh	Aam Aadmi Party	Government
111	Rajpura	Neena Mittal	Aam Aadmi Party	Government
113	Ghanaur	Gurlal Ghanaur	Aam Aadmi Party	Government
114	Sanour	Harmit Singh Pathanmajra	Aam Aadmi Party	Government
115.	Patiala	Ajit Pal Singh Kohli	Aam Aadmi Party	Government
116	Samana	Chetan Singh Jaura Majra	Aam Aadmi Party	Government
117	Shutrana (SC)	Kulwant Singh Bazigar	Aam Aadmi Party	Government

== Notable people ==
- Umang Gupta, an Indian-American entrepreneur in Silicon Valley, California
- Sanju Bansal, an Indian-American businessman, co-founder of MicroStrategy, a worldwide provider of enterprise software platforms
- Kamal Khan, a singer

== See also ==
- Bir Bunerheri Wildlife Sanctuary, wildlife sanctuary in the district
