= Karan Kaur Brar =

Indian politician

Member of the Punjab Legislative Assembly
- In office 2012–2017
- Preceded by: Adesh Kanwarjit Singh Brar(Sunny Brar)
- Succeeded by: Kanwarjit Singh Rozy Barkandi
- Constituency: Muktsar

Personal details
- Born: November 5, 1951 (age 74) Shimla, Himachal Pradesh
- Citizenship: Indian
- Party: Indian National Congress
- Spouse: Adesh Kanwarjit Singh Brar
- Education: Convent of Jesus and Mary, Delhi
- Alma mater: St. Bede's College
- Profession: Politician horse breeding

Karan Kaur Brar is an Indian politician and member of Indian National Congress. She was a Member of the Punjab Legislative Assembly from Muktsar(2012–2017). She is the daughter-in-law of former Chief Minister Harcharan Singh Brar.

== Personal life ==
Karan Kaur Brar was born in 1951. She was married to Adesh Kanwarjit Singh Brar(Sunny Brar). Together the couple has three sons. Her father-in-law Harcharan Singh Brar served as the 13th Chief Minister of Punjab. She completed her schooling from The Convent of Jesus and Mary at New Delhi. She is a graduate from St. Bede's College under Himachal University. Her majors were in History and French.

== Political career ==
Karan Kaur Brar started her political career in 2004. She fought the 2004 Lok Sabha elections from Faridkot against Sukhbir Singh Badal. In 2012, she was elected to the Punjab Legislative Assembly. She defeated Kanwarjit Singh Rozy Barkandi by 9255 votes. Barely two days before the elections results were announced Karan Brar lost her husband Adesh Kanwarjit Singh Brar(Sunny Brar) to cancer. During her tenure she remained Member of various committees including House Committee, Committee on Privileges, Committee on Public Accounts, Committee on Estimates and Committee on Local Bodies. She was the second richest candidate in the 2022 Punjab Assembly Elections.
