= Mohinder Singh Sayanwala =

Indian politician (born 1931)

Member of Parliament, Lok Sabha
- In office 1977–1980
- Preceded by: Sohan Singh Basi
- Succeeded by: Balram Jakhar
- Constituency: Firozpur

Personal details
- Born: 29 November 1931
- Party: Shiromani Akali Dal
- Spouse: Kulwant Kaur

Mohinder Singh Sayanwala (born 29 November 1931) is an Indian politician. He was elected to the Lok Sabha, lower house of the Parliament of India as a member of the Shiromani Akali Dal.
