= Kandwala =

Coordinates: 30.4°N 74.03°E

Kandhwala or Kandhwala HazarKhan is a village located in the Fazilka district of Punjab, India. The village falls under Tehsil of Fazilka district.

== History ==
This village is settled mainly by Jatts who follow Sikhism. A large majority are Bhullars, as well as Sandhus who fled here after the Indian/Pakistan partition. Many of these settlers were previously from villages near district of Lahore. This village used to be called Hazarkhan. This village is currently referred to as Kandhwala Hazarkhan as there is another village called Kandhwala in the tehsil Abohar, which is also in Firozpur district and located approximately 20 km from Fazilka. Kandhwala is on the rice growing and cotton rich belt of the state. Being at the border, Fazilka had to bear the brunt of the two Indo-Pakistani wars of 1965 and 1971. This also affected Kandhwala as many Sikhs migrated here as Muslims fled. In the second war many lost crops.

This village has a historical place, Baba Bhule Shah's Mazar, and every year people celebrate the Baba Bhule Shah mela on the date 25-26 Bhadro. Much of the agriculture in the land is covered by the kinnow fruit.

== Transport ==
Buses travel to Fazilka. National Highway 10 passes through Fazilka which links to Kandhwala.

== Demographics ==
District :Fazilka
Tehsil :Fazilka
State: Punjab, India

Climate Winter (21 December) : 2 °C (minimum)

Summer (21 May) : 45 °C (maximum)

Potable water: Deep tube wells

Rainfall : 15 cm (Annual)
