= Balram Jakhar =

Indian politician (1923–2016)

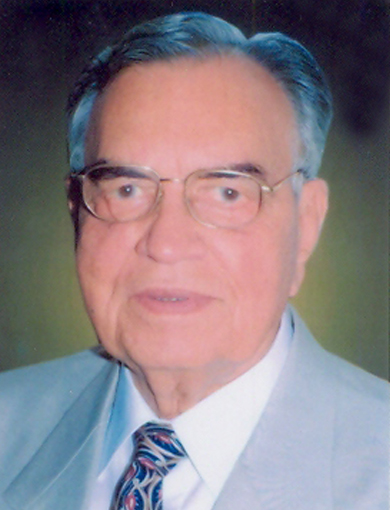
- Formal portrait, 2004

14th Governor of Madhya Pradesh
- In office 30 June 2004 – 30 June 2009
- Chief Minister: Uma Bharti; Babulal Gaur; Shivraj Singh Chouhan
- Preceded by: Lt. Gen. K. M. Seth(acting)
- Succeeded by: Rameshwar Thakur

Governor of Gujarat
- Additional Charge
- In office 12 July 2004 – 24 July 2004
- Chief Minister: Narendra Modi
- Preceded by: Kailashpati Mishra
- Succeeded by: Nawal Kishore Sharma

19th Union Minister of Agriculture
- In office 21 June 1991 – 17 January 1996
- Prime Minister: P. V. Narasimha Rao
- Preceded by: Devi Lal
- Succeeded by: Jagannath Mishra

8th Speaker of the Lok Sabha
- In office 22 January 1980 – 27 November 1989
- Deputy: G. Lakshmanan; M. Thambidurai
- Preceded by: K. S. Hegde
- Succeeded by: Rabi Ray

Leader of Opposition of Punjab Legislative Assembly
- In office 19 June 1977 – 17 February 1980
- Preceded by: Prakash Singh Badal
- Succeeded by: Prakash Singh Badal

Personal details
- Born: 23 August 1923 Panjkosi, Punjab, British India
- Died: 3 February 2016 (aged 92) Delhi, India
- Party: Indian National Congress
- Children: Sunil Kumar Jakhar
- Occupation: Farmer; politician

Balram Jakhar (23 August 1923 – 3 February 2016) was an Indian politician, who served as the Speaker of the Lok Sabha and Governor of Madhya Pradesh. He was also the longest serving Speaker of the Lok Sabha, whose tenure lasted 9 years and 329 days. Jakhar was among the popular faces of Jat politics in Rajasthan during 1980s. He served as the Minister of Agriculture and Farmers Welfare from 1991 to 1996 in Government of India. He was a member of Indian National Congress.

== Early life and education ==
Jakhar was born in British ruled India on 23 August 1923 to a Hindu Jat family in Panjkosi village of Fazilka district in Punjab now in Fazilka. His father was Chaudhari Rajaram Jakhar and his mother was Pattodevi Jakhar migrated to Pankosi from Montgomery District of West Punjab in 1900. Jakhar earned a degree in Sanskrit from Forman Christian College, Lahore, in 1945. He had knowledge of English, Punjabi, Urdu, Sanskrit and Hindi languages.

== Political career ==
A lifelong member of the Congress party, Jakhar founded the Bharatiya Krishak Samaj, a farmers' organization, in 1965. He was elected to the Punjab Legislative Assembly from Abohar in 1972 and was re-elected in 1977, becoming the Leader of the Opposition.

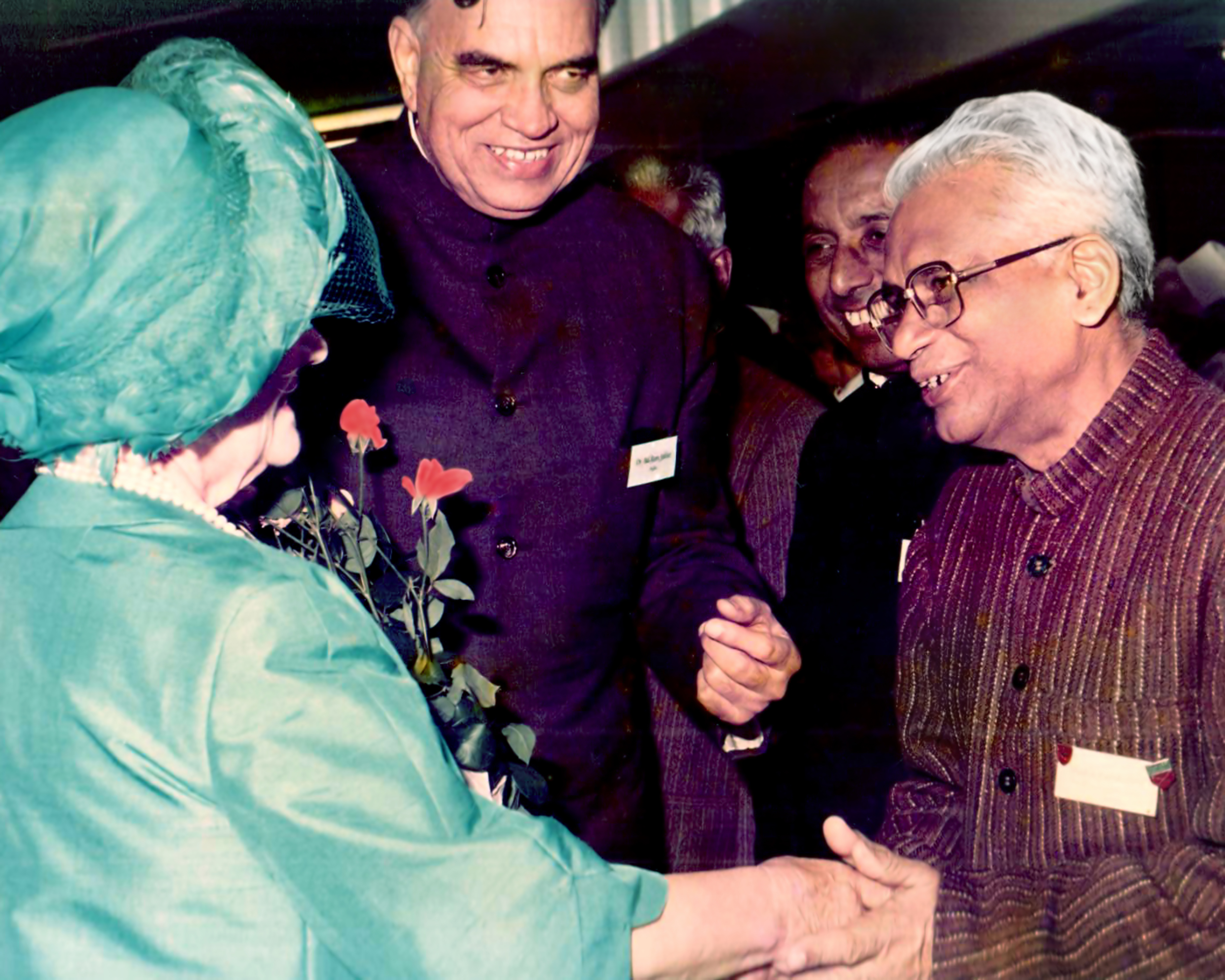
Speaker Jakhar (center) with Pandit Ram Kishore Shukla and Queen Elizabeth The Queen Mother at a Commonwealth Conference.

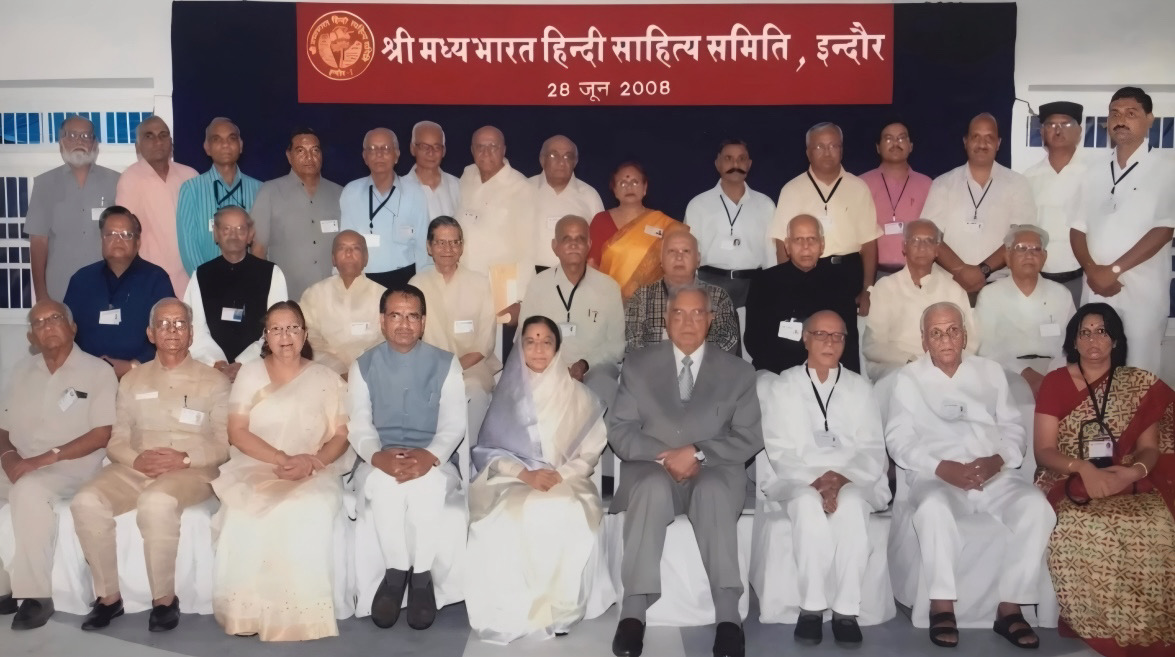
Pratibha Patil, then President of India; Balram Jakhar, then Governor; Shivraj Singh Chouhan, then Chief Minister of Madhya Pradesh; Narayan Prasad Shukla; and Sumitra Mahajan at the centenary (100th anniversary) celebrations of the Shri Madhyabharat Hindi Sahitya Samiti.

Jakhar then moved to national politics. He was elected in 1980 to the seventh Lok Sabha from Ferozepur and in 1984 to the eighth Lok Sabha from Sikar. He had the distinction of being elected Speaker of the Lok Sabha during his very first term in the house. Furthermore, served twice as Speaker of Lok Sabha, a rare achievement in Indian parliament history, holding office from 1980 to 1989, thus became the longest serving speaker in history. As Speaker of Lok Sabha, he promoted automation and computerization of Parliamentary works. He promoted Parliament library, reference, research, documentation and information services for the knowledge and use of members of Parliament. The establishment of Parliament Museum was his contribution. He was the first Asian to be elected Chairman of the Commonwealth Parliamentarian Executive Forum.

He was an attendee of the second Provisional World Parliament held in New Delhi on 17 March 1985.

The Sikar parliamentary seat was won by Devi Lal in the elections of 1989. In 1991, Jakhar was again elected to parliament from the Sikar constituency and his party returned to power in India. Jakhar was made Union Agriculture minister under Prime Minister P. V. Narasimha Rao in 1991.

After the Congress party returned to power in 2004, he was appointed Governor of Madhya Pradesh and served from 30 June 2004 to 30 May 2009. Academy of Grassroots Studies and Research of India (AGRASRI), Tirupati, awarded him the Rajiv Gandhi Outstanding Leadership National Award for the year 2012 on 20 August 2012 at New Delhi, by Shri Shivraj V. Patil, the then Governor of Punjab. Dr. Balram Jakhar delivered the 11th Rajiv Gandhi Memorial Lecture on 20 August 2012 at the Indian Institute of Public Administration, New Delhi.

== Personal life ==
Jakhar was the father of three sons:

- Sajjan Kumar Jakhar, the eldest son, is a former minister in the Punjab government. Father of Ajay Vir Jakhar.
  - Ajay Vir Jakhar, son of Sajjan Kumar Jakhar, is Chairman of Bharat Krishak Samaj, a farmer organization, and writes frequently on farmer issues in reputed newspapers.
- Surinder Jakhar, second son, died of a self-inflicted bullet injury (probably accidental) in 2011. Surinder served as chairman of Asia's cooperative fertiliser giant IFFCO for four terms and chief of Asian Cooperative Alliance for two terms. Surinder is the father of Sandeep Jakhar.
  - Sandeep Jakhar, son of Surinder Jakhar, is one of very few candidates who managed to win on a Congress party ticket in the Punjab assembly election of 2022 from Abohar.
- Sunil Jakhar, youngest son. Before resigning from the party in 2022, Sunil was long a member of his father's Congress party. He is a three-time MLA from Abohar. He became Leader of the Opposition in Punjab in March 2012. He was elected to parliament from Gurdaspur in 2017 and was made President of his party's Punjab unit the same year. He left the party on 14 May 2022. He is currently serving as President of Bharatiya Janata Party, Punjab unit since 4 July 2023.

Lok Sabha
Preceded by Mohinder Singh Sayanwala	Member of Parliament for Ferozepur; 1980–1984	Succeeded by Gurdial Singh Dhillon
Preceded by Kumbharam Arya	Member of Parliament for Sikar; 1984–1989	Succeeded by Devi Lal
Preceded by Devi Lal	Member of Parliament for Sikar; 1991–1996	Succeeded by Dr. Hari Singh
Political offices
Preceded by K. S. Hegde	Speaker of the Lok Sabha; 22 January 1980 – 18 December 1989	Succeeded by Rabi Ray
Preceded by Kailashpati Mishra	Governor of Gujarat (Acting); July 2004 – July 2004	Succeeded by Nawal Kishore Sharma
Preceded by Lt. Gen. K. M. Seth (Acting)	Governor of Madhya Pradesh; 30 June 2004 – 29 June 2009	Succeeded by Rameshwar Thakur
