= Firozpur Lok Sabha constituency =

Constituency of the Indian parliament in Punjab

Coordinates: 30.94°N 74.61°E

Firozpur PB-10
- Lok Sabha constituency
- Interactive Map Outlining Firozpur Lok Sabha constituency

Constituency details
- Country: India
- State: Punjab
- Assembly constituencies: Firozpur City; Firozpur Rural; Guru Har Sahai; Jalalabad; Fazilka; Abohar; Balluana; Malout; Muktsar
- Established: 1952
- Reservation: None

Member of Parliament
- 18th Lok Sabha
- Incumbent Sher Singh Ghubaya
- Party: INC
- Alliance: INDIA
- Elected year: 2024
- Preceded by: Sukhbir Singh Badal

Firozpur Lok Sabha constituency, formerly Ferozepur Lok Sabha constituency is one of the 13 Lok Sabha constituencies in Punjab state in northern India.

== Assembly segments ==
Presently, Firozpur Lok Sabha constituency comprises the following nine Legislative Assembly segments:

#	Name	District	Member	Party	Leading (in 2024)
76	Firozpur City	Firozpur	Ranveer Singh Bhullar	AAP	BJP
77	Firozpur Rural (SC)	Firozpur	Rajnish Dahiya	AAP	SAD
78	Guru Har Sahai	Firozpur	Fauja Singh Sarari	AAP	SAD
79	Jalalabad	Fazilka	Jagdeep Kamboj Goldy	AAP	INC
80	Fazilka	Fazilka	Narinderpal Singh Sawna	AAP	INC
81	Abohar	Fazilka	Sandeep Jakhar	IND	BJP
82	Balluana (SC)	Fazilka	Amandeep Singh Musafir	AAP	BJP
85	Malout (SC)	Sri Muktsar Sahib	Baljit Kaur	AAP	SAD
86	Muktsar	Sri Muktsar Sahib	Jagdeep Singh Brar	AAP	AAP

== Members of Parliament ==
Most Successful parties from Firozpur Lok Sabha
1. SAD (11 Times) (57.9%)
2. INC (5 Times) (26.3%)
3. BSP (2 Times) (10.5%)
4. IND (1 Time) (5.26%)

Election	Member	Party
1952	Bahadur Singh, Lal Singh	Shiromani Akali Dal
1957	Iqbal Singh	Indian National Congress
1962	Iqbal Singh	Indian National Congress
1967	Sohan Singh Basi	Shiromani Akali Dal
1969^	G Singh	Shiromani Akali Dal
1971	Mohinder Singh Gill	Shiromani Akali Dal
1977	Mohinder Singh Sayanwala	Shiromani Akali Dal
1980	Balram Jakhar	Indian National Congress
1984	Gurdial Singh Dhillon	Indian National Congress
1989	Dhian Singh Mand	Independent
1992	Mohan Singh Phalianwala	Bahujan Samaj Party
1996	Mohan Singh Phalianwala	Bahujan Samaj Party
1998	Zora Singh Maan	Shiromani Akali Dal
1999	Zora Singh Maan	Shiromani Akali Dal
2004	Zora Singh Maan	Shiromani Akali Dal
2009	Sher Singh Ghubaya	Shiromani Akali Dal
2014	Sher Singh Ghubaya	Shiromani Akali Dal
2019	Sukhbir Singh Badal	Shiromani Akali Dal
2024	Sher Singh Ghubaya	Indian National Congress

^By poll

== Election results ==
=== 2024 ===
2024 Indian general election: Firozpur
Party	Candidate	Votes	%	±%
INC	Sher Singh Ghubaya	266,626	23.70	▼13.38
AAP	Jagdeep Singh Kaka Brar	263,384	23.41	▲20.69
BJP	Rana Gurmit Singh Sodhi	255,097	22.67	New entry
SAD	Nardev Singh Bobby Mann	253,645	22.54	▼31.51
SAD(A)	Bhupinder Singh Bhullar	15,941	1.42	New
NOTA	None of the Above	6,100	0.54	▼0.73
Majority		3,242	0.29	▼16.68
Turnout		1,125,115	67.37	
Registered electors		1,670,008		
INC gain from SAD		Swing		

=== 2019 ===
2019 Indian general elections: Firozpur
Party	Candidate	Votes	%	±%
SAD	Sukhbir Singh Badal	633,427	54.05	▲9.92
INC	Sher Singh Ghubaya	434,577	37.08	▼4.21
AAP	Harjinder Singh Kaka Sran	31,872	2.72	▼7.54
CPI	Hans Raj Golden	26,128	2.23	N/A
NOTA	None of the Above	14,891	1.27	▲0.57
Majority		198,850	16.97	▲14.13
Turnout		1,172,801	72.47	▼0.15
SAD hold		Swing	▲7.07	

=== 2014 ===
2014 Indian general elections: Firozpur
Party	Candidate	Votes	%	±%
SAD	Sher Singh Ghubaya	487,932	44.13	▼2.98
INC	Sunil Kumar Jakhar	456,512	41.29	▼3.62
AAP	Satnam Paul Kamboj	113,412	10.26	New
BSP	Ram Kumar Parjapat	22,274	2.01	▼1.09
SAD(A)	Dhian Singh Mand	3,655	0.33	N/A
NOTA	None of the Above	7,685	0.70	N/A
Majority		31,420	2.84	▼0.36
Turnout		1,105,412	72.62	▲1.34
SAD hold		Swing		

=== 2009 ===
2009 Indian general elections: Firozpur
Party	Candidate	Votes	%	±%
SAD	Sher Singh Ghubaya	450,900	47.11	
INC	Jagmeet Singh Brar	4,29,829	44.91	
BSP	Gurdev Singh	29,713	3.10	
IND	Jagmeet Singh	5,890	0.62	
IND	Dalip Kumar	5,376	0.56	
Majority		21,071	3.20	▲1.87
Turnout		9,56,895	71.28	
SAD hold		Swing		

== See also ==
- Firozpur district
- List of constituencies of the Lok Sabha
- Fazilka Lok Sabha constituency
