= Balluana Assembly constituency =

Legislative Assembly constituency in Punjab State, India

Coordinates: 30.22°N 74.78°E

Balluana
- Constituency No. 82 for the Punjab Legislative Assembly

Constituency details
- Country: India
- State: Punjab
- District: Fazilka
- Lok Sabha constituency: Firozpur
- Total electors: 186,634 (in 2024)
- Reservation: SC

Member of Legislative Assembly
- 16th Punjab Legislative Assembly
- Incumbent Amandeep Singh Musafir
- Party: Aam Aadmi Party
- Elected year: 2017

Balluana (Sl. No.: 82) is a Punjab Legislative Assembly constituency in Fazilka district, Punjab state, India.

== Members of the Legislative Assembly ==
Most successful parties from Balluana Vidhan Sabha
1. INC (5 Times) (50.0%)
2. SAD (3 Times) (30.0%)
3. AAP (1 Times) (10.0%)
4. INC (I) (1 Time) (10.0%)

Election	Member	Party
1977	Ujagar Singh	Indian National Congress
1980	Hansraj Arya	Indian National Congress (Indira)
1985	Ujagar Singh	Indian National Congress
1987-1992 President's Rule
1992	Babu Ram	Indian National Congress
1997	Gurtej Singh	Shiromani Akali Dal
2002	Parkash Singh Bhatti	Indian National Congress
2007	Gurtej Singh	Shiromani Akali Dal
2012	Gurtej Singh	Shiromani Akali Dal
2017	Nathu Ram	Indian National Congress
2022	Amandeep Singh Musafir	Aam Aadmi Party

== Election results ==
Punjab Assembly election, 2027: Balluana
Party	Candidate	Votes	%	±%
AAP				
AD (WPD)				New entry
INC				
BSP				
SAD				
BJP				
NOTA	None of the above			
Majority				
Turnout				

=== 2022 ===
Punjab Assembly election, 2022: Balluana
Party	Candidate	Votes	%	±%
AAP	Amandeep Singh Musafir	58,893	40.91	
BJP	Vandana Sangwal	39,720	27.59	New entry
INC	Rajinder Kaur	22,747	15.8	
SAD	Prithi Ram Megh	17,816	12.38	
Independent	Surinder Singh Khalsa	1,988	1.38	
Independent	Manjit Kaur	393	0.27	
NOTA	None of the above	1,236	0.86	
Majority		19,173	13.32	
Turnout				
Registered electors		183,929		

=== 2017 ===
Punjab Assembly election, 2017: Balluana
Party	Candidate	Votes	%	±%
INC	Nathu Ram	65,607	45.96	
SAD	Partkash Singh Bhatti	50,158	35.14	
AAP	Simarjit Singh	22,464	15.74	
AITC	Giri Raj Rajora	1,072	0.75	
BSP	Satish Kumar	888	0.62	
Independent	Vinod Kumar	705	0.49	
National Adhikar Insaf Party	Gurmail Singh	667	0.47	{{{change}}}
NOTA	None of the above	1175	0.82	
Majority			10. 82	
Turnout				−
INC hold		Swing	+	

=== 2007 ===
Punjab Assembly election, 2007: Balluana
Party	Candidate	Votes	%	±%
SAD	Gurtej Singh	50,929	-	
INC	Partkash Singh Bhatti	36295		
Independent	Babu Ram	13213		
BSP	Girdhari Lal	2915		
CPI(M)	Achhar Singh	1366		
NCP	Dalbir Singh	1110		
Independent (Politician)	Karnail Kaur	769		{{{change}}}
Majority		1,98,850	16.97	+14.13
Turnout		11,72,801	72.47	−0.15
SAD hold		Swing	+7.07	

=== 1985 ===
1985 Punjab Legislative Assembly election: Balluana
Party	Candidate	Votes	%	±%
INC	Hansraj Arya	22,079	42.29	
SAD	Ujagar Singh	17897	34.28	
CPI	Harphool Ram	7659	14.67	
Independent	Balwant Rai	2220	4.25	
Independent	Jakam Singh	942	1.80	
Independent	Gurucharan Singh	652	1.25	
Independent	Sohan Lal	346	0.66	{{{change}}}
Independent	Mohan Singh	247	0.47	
Independent	Jagala Ram	165	0.32	

== Previous results ==
Year	A C No.	Name	Party	Votes	Runner Up	Party	Votes
2012	82	Gurtej Singh	SAD	49418	Giriraj Rajora	INC	41191
2002	90	Parkash Singh Bhatti	INC	41683	Gurtej Singh	SAD	37363
1997	90	Gurtej Singh	SAD	44835	Babu Ram	INC	22804
1992	90	Babu Ram	INC	17192	Satish Kumar	BSP	7102
1980	90	Ujagar Singh	INC(I)	21688	Dana Ram	CPI	19977
1977	90	Ujagar Singh	INC	21262	Shiv Chand	SAD	18748

== See also ==
- List of constituencies of the Punjab Legislative Assembly
- Fazilka district
- Abohar Assembly constituency
- Firozpur (Lok Sabha constituency)
- 2019 Indian general election in Punjab
