= Kilianwali =

Village in Fazilka, Punjab, India

- Country: India
- State: Punjab
- District: Fazilka

Languages

Kilianwali is a village in Fazilka district of Punjab, India. It is seven kilometers away from Abohar. This village was founded by Lal Singh Jakhar. Its full name is Kilianwali Lal Singh.
