= Mohan Singh Phalianwala =

Indian politician

Mohan Singh Phalianwala is an Indian politician from Punjab who was associated with the Bahujan Samaj Party (BSP). He represented the Firozpur Lok Sabha constituency in the Indian Parliament in 1992 and 1996. He served as president of the BSP's Punjab unit from 1986 to 2002 and later joined the Aam Aadmi Party (AAP) in June 2016. He subsequently joined the Indian National Congress ahead of the 2019 general election period.

== Political career ==
=== Bahujan Samaj Party ===
Phalianwala was associated with the Bahujan Samaj Party for several decades and became president of its Punjab unit in 1986. He was influenced by BSP founder Kanshi Ram and participated in the party's political activities among disadvantaged communities. He won the Ferozepur Lok Sabha constituency in the 1992 and 1996 elections. In the 1996 election, he defeated Congress candidate Sunil Jakhar by approximately 59,900 votes. He lost the constituency in the 1999 general election to Zora Singh Maan of the Shiromani Akali Dal.

=== Later political affiliations ===
In June 2016, Phalianwala joined the Aam Aadmi Party in Chandigarh alongside supporters. He stated that he had joined the BSP under Kanshi Ram's influence but felt that the party had lost its direction after Kanshi Ram's death.

In 2019, he was reported to have joined the Indian National Congress.

== See also ==
- Bahujan Samaj Party
- Firozpur Lok Sabha constituency
