= Muhar Jamsher =

- Village
- Location in Punjab, India Muhar Jamsher (India)
- Coordinates: 30°28′03.5″N 73°56′24.0″E
- Country: India
- State: Punjab
- District: Fazilka

Languages
  - Official: Punjabi, Hindi
- Time zone: UTC+5:30 (IST)
- PIN: 152123
- Telephone code: 01638
- Vehicle registration: PB-22
- total population: 869
- houses: 142
- hectares: 549.15
- Lok Sabha constituency: Firozpur

Muhar Jamsher is a village in Fazilka district in the Indian state of Punjab. It is located around 20 kilometers from the nearest city, Fazilka city, the district headquarters. Muhar Jamsher is noted for being one of two villages in India that is surrounded by Pakistan on three sides and by a river on the other. In February 2014, a road bridge was constructed over the Sutlej river for the first time to connect Muhar Jamsher with the rest of the Indian mainland.

Muhar Jamsher has a population of 1500 residents. Despite the availability of a bridge, residents have likened living in the village to that of a prison because the bridge is frequently locked by Border Security Force for security reasons.
