= Khuhi Khera =

Khuhi Khera is a village, 10 kilometers west of Abohar, in the Fazilka district, Punjab, India.
