= Waryam Khera =

Coordinates: 30°01′N 74°05′E

Waryam Khera is a village 22 kilometres from Abohar in the Fazilka district of Punjab. The main industry is agriculture.

The village has a Dera, Baba Lakshman Giri Ji Maharaj. Thousands of devotees come here every year. Baba Lakshman Giri Ji took Samadhi alive in the first decade of twentieth century. Later, Pandit Hetram Sharma, son of Pandit Govardhan Daas Sharma, opened a school in Abohar in the memory of his father. He was a great educator, born in Waryam Khera in 1916. He studied in Lahore before the partition of the country. This village has a Government Senior Secondary School, which teaches up to the twelfth grade.

The village is Hindu, but some Sikh families live in dwellings called dhaanis, are located outside the village. This village is in Distt Fazilka (Punjab), inin southern Punjab near Distt Sriganganagar (Rajasthan) about 35 kilometer from Shri Ganganagar and 20 kilometers from Sadulsahar.
