= Ghuriana =

Village in Punjab, India

According to Census 2011 information the location code or village code of Ghurianan village is 035070. Ghurianan village is located in Fazilka Tehsil of Firozpur district in Punjab, India. It is situated 30km away from sub-district headquarter Fazilka and 107km from district headquarter Firozpur. As per 2009 stats, Ghuriana is the gram panchayat of Ghurianan village. The total population is 2,885, with 1,517 males and 1,368 females.

The total geographical area of village is 1233 hectares. There are about 552 houses in Ghurianan village. Abohar is nearest town. Ghuriana is a village in the Arniwala Sheikh Suban block of the Fazilka district, in the state of Punjab, India.

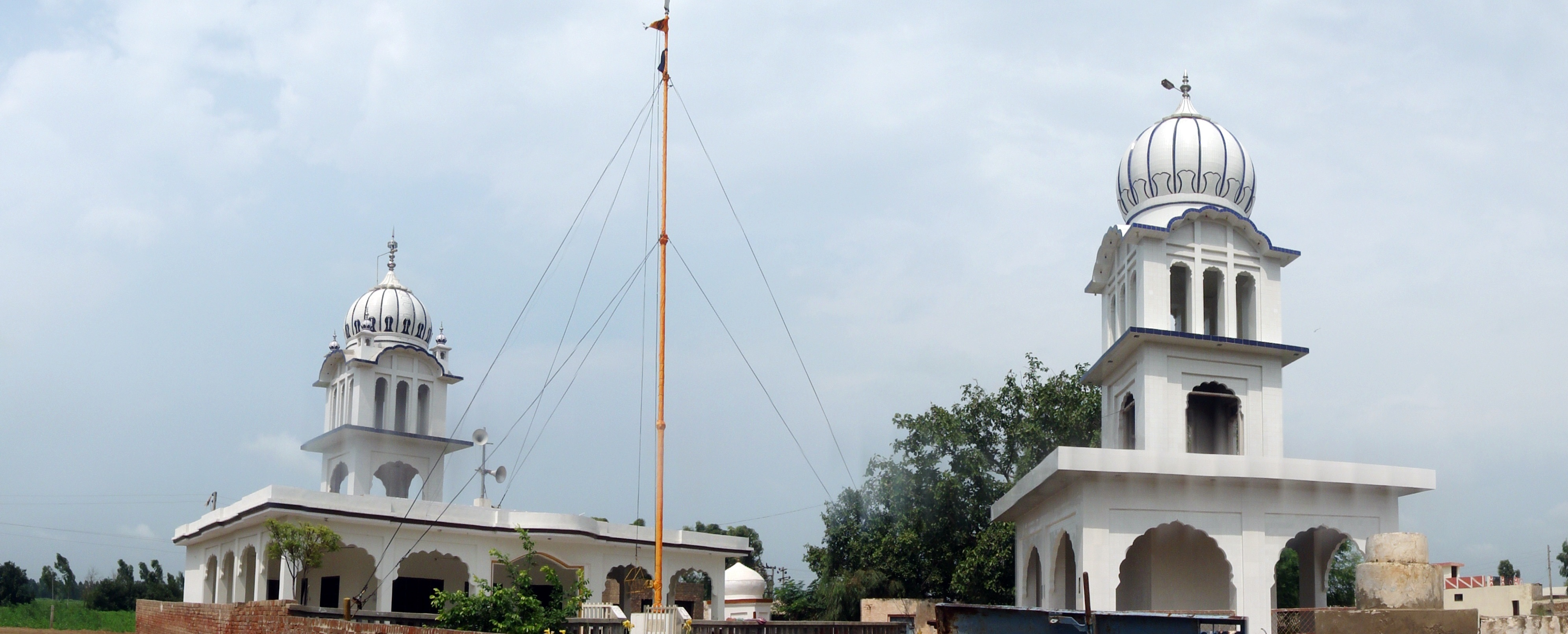
Gurudwara Sahib & Baba Bala ji Smadh Ghuriana
