= Iqbal Singh (politician, born 1923) =

Indian politician

Members of the 4th Lok Sabha
- In office 1967–1970
- Constituency: Fazilka

Deputy Minister of Petroleum and Chemicals
- In office January 1966 – March 1967

Members of the 3rd Lok Sabha
- In office 1962–1967
- Constituency: Firozpur

Members of the 2nd Lok Sabha
- In office 1957–1962
- Constituency: Firozpur

Members of the 1st Lok Sabha
- In office 1954–1957
- Constituency: Fazilka-Sirsa

Personal details
- Born: 27 October 1923 Punjab, India
- Died: 1988 (aged 64) Ludhiana, Punjab, India
- Party: Indian National Congress
- Spouse: Rajeshwar Kaur
- Children: 3
- Education: Sikh National College, Lahore

Sardar Iqbal Singh (27 October 1923 – 1988) was an Indian politician and member of parliament who represented Fazilka-Sirsa parliamentary constituency in 1st Lok Sabha (1954—57), Firozpur constituency in 2nd Lok Sabha (1957—62), and was re-elected from the same constituency in 3rd Lok Sabha (1962—67). He was last elected from Fazilka parliamentary constituency in 4th Lok Sabha (1967–70). A member of the Indian National Congress, he also served as a deputy-minister of Petroleum and Chemicals from January 1966 to March 1967 and deputy-minister for Works, Housing and Supply in 1967.

== Life and career ==
Singh was born in Firozpur, Punjab, India on 27 October 1923 to Sardar Rattan Singh. He received his at M.B. High School, Abohar and Sikh National College, Lahore. He was the first to be appointed as a president of the Punjab Students' Congress from 1944 to 46, and later he organised students' movement in Lahore, in addition to participating in the Quit India Movement. He was later jailed for taking part in the Quit India Movement.

Singh was also appointed as a member of Shiromani Gurdwara Parbandhak Committee (1946—55), member of All India Congress Committee (AICC) in 1955, member of Punjab Pradesh Congress Committee (PCC) (1948—52) and was re-elected as PCC member in 1955, and later general secretary of All India Khalsa Dal.

Singh was married to Rajeshwar Kaur, with whom he had three children, including one daughter and two sons. He died in 1988, at the age of 64.
