= Sohan Singh Basi =

Indian politician

Member of Parliament, Lok Sabha
- In office 1967–1971
- Preceded by: Iqbal Singh
- Succeeded by: G Singh
- Constituency: Firozpur

Personal details
- Born: 8 June 1910
- Party: Shiromani Akali Dal
- Spouse: Basant Kaur

Sohan Singh Basi (born 8 June 1910) was an Indian politician. He was elected to the Lok Sabha, lower house of the Parliament of India as a member of the Shiromani Akali Dal.
