= Fazilka Lok Sabha constituency =

Constituency of the Indian parliament in Punjab

Coordinates: 30.4°N 74.0°E

Fazilka
- Former Lok Sabha constituency

Constituency details
- Country: India
- State: Punjab
- Established: 1967
- Abolished: 1977

Fazilka was a Lok Sabha constituency in Punjab from 1967 to 1977. It was the successor of Fazilka-Sirsa constituency which existed from 1952 to 1957. Post the 1976 delimitation, parts of it came under the Firozpur Lok Sabha constituency.

== Members of Parliament ==
Most Successful parties from Fazilka Sahib Lok Sabha
1. INC (3 Times) (75.0%)
2. SAD (1 Time) (25.0%)

As Fazilka-Sirsa Lok Sabha constituency

Election	Member	Party
1952	Atma Singh Namdhari	Indian National Congress
1954^	Iqbal Singh	Indian National Congress

As Fazilka Lok Sabha constituency

Election	Member	Party
1967	Iqbal Singh	Indian National Congress
1971	Gurdas Singh Badal	Shiromani Akali Dal

^bypoll

For post-1977 results, see Firozpur Lok Sabha constituency

== See also ==
- Fazilka
- List of constituencies of the Lok Sabha
- Firozpur Lok Sabha constituency
