= Jagdeep Singh Kaka Brar =

Indian politician

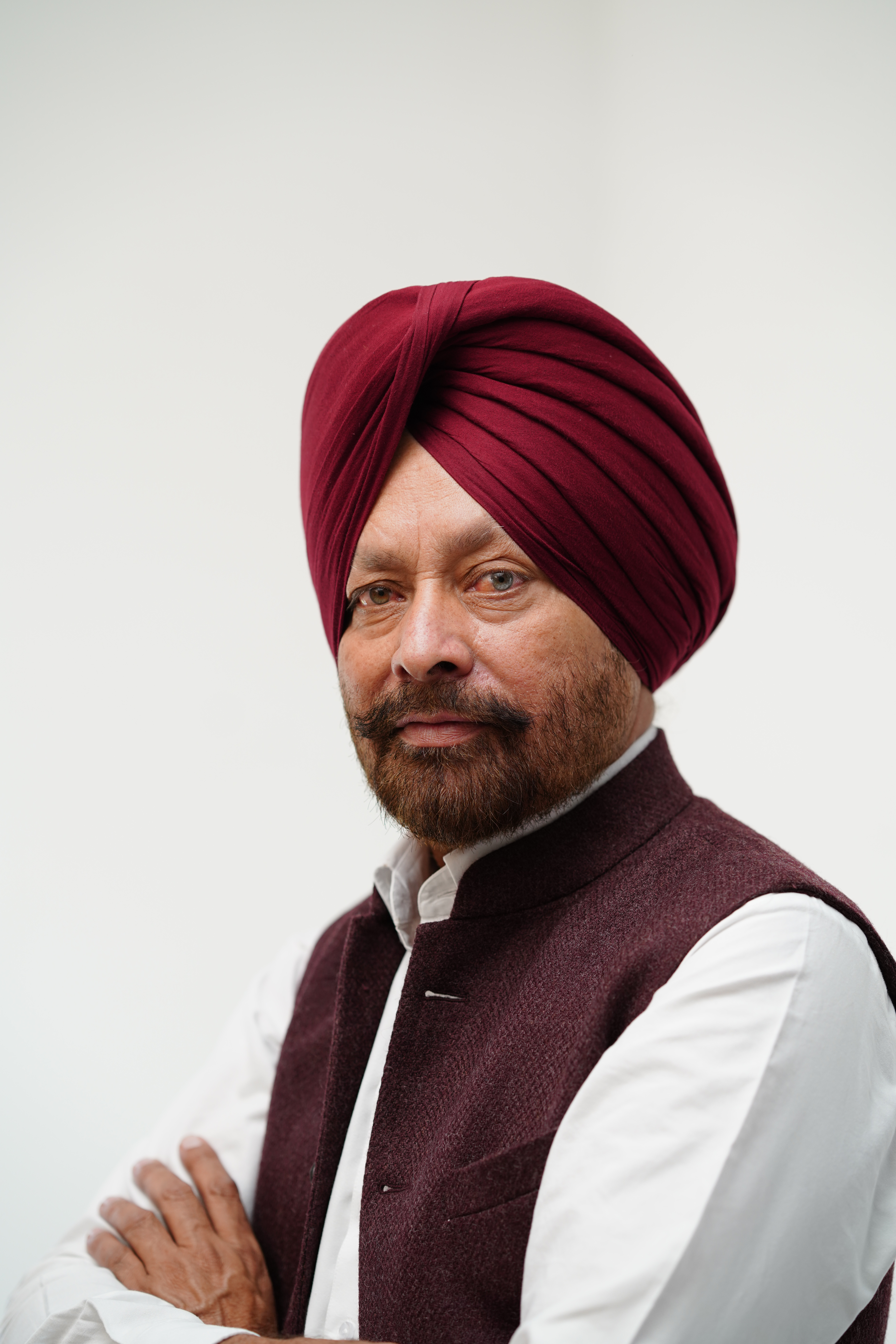

Member of the Punjab Legislative Assembly
- Incumbent
- Assumed office 2022
- Preceded by: Kanwarjit Singh Rozy Barkandi, SAD
- Constituency: Muktsar

Personal details
- Party: Aam Aadmi Party

Jagdeep Singh, also known by the name Jagdeep Singh Kaka Brar or Kaka Brar, is an Indian politician and the Member of the Legislative Assembly representing the Muktsar Assembly constituency in the Punjab Legislative Assembly. He is a member of the Aam Aadmi Party. He was elected as the MLA in the 2022 Punjab Legislative Assembly election.

== Career ==
Prior to entering politics, Brar worked as an agriculturist and owns agricultural land in Chak Jawahrewala village. Brar's elder sister, Gurpreet Kaur Gill, actively participated in Anna Hazare’s 2011 Indian anti-corruption movement in New Delhi. He was inspired by her to enter active politics.

Brar had served twice as a Municipal Councillor. In 2017, he unsuccessfully contested the Punjab Assembly polls from Muktsar as an AAP candidate. On 16th April 2024, the Aam Aadmi Party announced Jagdeep Singh Kaka Brar as their candidate for the Firozpur Lok Sabha Seat.

=== Member of Legislative Assembly ===
Brar was elected as the MLA in the 2022 Punjab Legislative Assembly election to the 16th Assembly of the Punjab Legislative Assembly in March 2022. He won by a margin of 34,194 votes defeating his closest competitor, Kanwarjit Singh of Shiromani Akali Dal. Brar got a total of 76,321 votes, holding 51.09% of the total votes polled in the constituency. The Aam Aadmi Party gained a strong 79% majority in the sixteenth Punjab Legislative Assembly by winning 92 out of 117 seats in the 2022 Punjab Legislative Assembly election. MP Bhagwant Mann was sworn in as Chief Minister on 16 March 2022.

Committee assignments of Punjab Legislative Assembly

- Member (2022–23) Committee on Questions & References

== Electoral performance ==
Assembly Election, 2017: Sri Muktsar Sahib
Party	Candidate	Votes	%	±%
SAD	Kanwarjit Singh Rozy Barkandi	44,894	30.5	
INC	Karan Kaur	36,914	25.10	
AAP	Jagdeep Singh Kaka Brar	33,201	22.57	
Independent	Sukhdarshan Singh Mrar	28,204	19.2	
NOTA	None of the Above	858	0.5	
Majority		7,980	5.5	
Turnout		146,226	83.5	
Registered electors		176,112		

2022 Assembly election: Sri Muktsar Sahib
Party	Candidate	Votes	%	±%
AAP	Jagdeep Singh Kaka Brar	76,321	51.09	▲28.52
SAD	Kanwarjit Singh Rozy Barkandi	42,127	28.20	▼2.32
INC	Karan Kaur Brar	14,290	9.57	▼15.53
BJP	Rajesh Pathela	10,634	7.2	New entry
Majority		34,194	22.89	
Turnout		149,390	78.9	
Registered electors		189,274		
AAP gain from SAD		Swing		

2024 Indian general election: Firozpur
Party	Candidate	Votes	%	±%
INC	Sher Singh Ghubaya	266,626	23.70	▼13.38
AAP	Jagdeep Singh Kaka Brar	263,384	23.41	▲20.69
BJP	Rana Gurmit Singh Sodhi	255,097	22.67	New entry
SAD	Nardev Singh Bobby Mann	253,645	22.54	▼31.51
SAD(A)	Bhupinder Singh Bhullar	15,941	1.42	New
NOTA	None of the Above	6,100	0.54	▼0.73
Majority		3,242	0.29	▼16.68
Turnout		1,125,115	67.37	
Registered electors		1,670,008		
INC gain from SAD		Swing		

== Personal life ==
His wife, Naginder Kaur, is also an agriculturist. Brar has three children.

State Legislative Assembly
Preceded by Kanwarjit Singh Rozy Barkandi (SAD)	Member of the Punjab Legislative Assembly from Muktsar Assembly constituency March 2022 –	Incumbent
