= Sunil Kumar Jakhar =

Indian politician

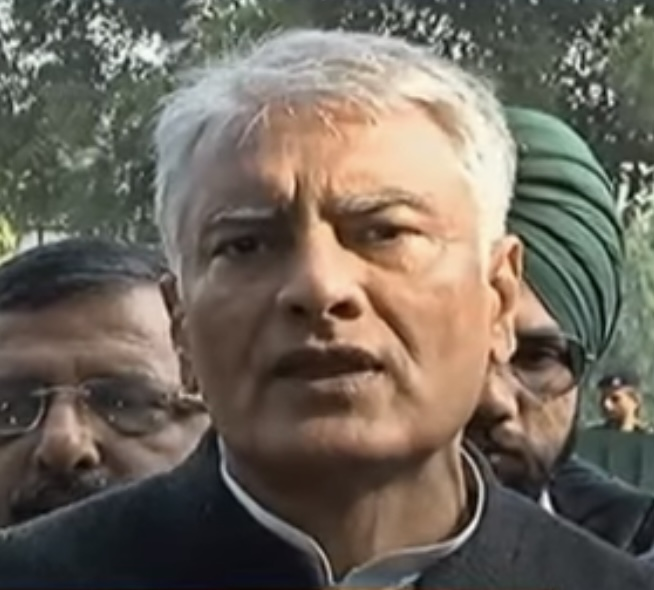

President of Bharatiya Janata Party, Punjab
- In office 4 July 2023 – 3 June 2026
- President: JP Nadda; Nitin Nabin
- Preceded by: Ashwini Sharma
- Succeeded by: Kewal Singh Dhillon

Member of Parliament, Lok Sabha
- In office 15 December 2017 – 23 May 2019
- Preceded by: Vinod Khanna
- Succeeded by: Sunny Deol
- Constituency: Gurdaspur

President of the Punjab Pradesh Congress Committee
- In office 4 May 2017 – 18 July 2021
- Preceded by: Amarinder Singh
- Succeeded by: Navjot Singh Sidhu

Leader of the opposition in the Punjab Legislative Assembly
- In office 14 March 2012 – 11 December 2015
- Preceded by: Rajinder Kaur Bhattal
- Succeeded by: Charanjit Singh Channi

Member of the Punjab Legislative Assembly
- In office 2002–2017
- Preceded by: Ram Kumar Goyal
- Succeeded by: Arun Narang
- Constituency: Abohar

Personal details
- Born: 9 February 1954 (age 72) Panjkosi, Punjab, India
- Party: Bharatiya Janata Party (2022–present)
- Other political affiliations: Indian National Congress (1990–2022)
- Spouse: Silvia Jakhar
- Relations: Sandeep Jakhar (nephew)
- Parent: Balram Jakhar
- Education: Government College, Chandigarh (BA); Kurukshetra University (MBA)

Sunil Kumar Jakhar (born 9 February 1954) is an Indian politician. Jakhar has been serving as the president of the Bharatiya Janata Party, Punjab unit since 4 July 2023. Jakhar, hailing from an established political family, is noted politically for his clean image and bluntness. Elected consecutively three times from the Abohar Assembly constituency (2002–2017), he was the Leader of the Opposition in the Punjab Vidhan Sabha from 2012 to 2015. Jakhar was a Member of Parliament from the Gurdaspur constituency from 2017 to 2019.

In his long political career, Jakhar has served in various offices and posts. He was a member of the Indian National Congress (INC) for five decades until 2022. Previously, Jakhar was the president of the Punjab Pradesh Congress Committee from 2017 to 2021. Following the ouster of Amarinder Singh as Chief Minister of Punjab in 2021, Jakhar was a front runner to replace him as Chief Minister; however, the INC leadership did not select him for the office. In May 2022, he joined the Bharatiya Janata Party (BJP), claiming that he wanted to support "nationalism, unity and brotherhood in Punjab". Jakhar is the only Punjab politician to have led the state units of both the INC and the BJP.

== Early life and background ==
Sunil Kumar Jakhar was born on 9 February 1954 in Panjkosi village of Fazilka district in Punjab and his family belongs to Punjabi Hindu Jat community. Hailing from a political family, several of Jakhar's family members have been involved in politics. His father was Balram Jakhar, a prominent Indian politician of the Indian National Congress (INC), who served as the Longest serving Speaker of the Lok Sabha and founded the Bharatiya Krishak Samaj, a farmers' organization. Jakhar is the youngest of his father's three sons. Jakhar's eldest brother, Sajjan Kumar Jakhar served as a minister in the Beant Singh's Punjab government (1992–1995). His other brother, Surinder Jakhar, served as the chairman of the Indian Farmers Fertiliser Cooperative (IFFCO) for four terms before his accidental death in 2011. Jakhar's nephew, Sandeep Jakhar, the son of his brother Surinder, is also a politician.

Jakhar obtained a Bachelor of Arts from the Government College, Chandigarh; and did his post graduate Masters of Business Administration program from Kurukshetra University.

== Allegations of Caste Discrimination ==
Sunil Jakhar has been criticised for remarks concerning Charanjit Singh Channi’s academic work. Jakhar stated that Channi had written a doctoral thesis analysing the Congress party’s electoral defeat. However, Channi’s PhD thesis is titled “Indian National Congress: A Study of Central Organisation and Electoral Strategies in the Lok Sabha Elections since 2004,” and does not focus on a single electoral loss.

Jakhar has also faced criticism for earlier comments directed at Channi that some observers and political opponents interpreted as caste-based. These included a remark suggesting that individuals who should have been “kept at upper caste people’s feet” were instead “put on their heads.” Critics have linked these remarks with Jakhar’s statements about Channi’s thesis, alleging a pattern of derogatory commentary, while Jakhar has not publicly acknowledged any caste-based intent.

Congress MLA from the Balluana constituency in Fazilka district wrote to Punjab Pradesh Congress Committee (PPCC) president Sunil Jakhar alleging that his authority in the constituency was being undermined. In the letter, the MLA stated that he felt “insulted” because his decisions were not being implemented and requested that Jakhar appoint another person to take charge of the constituency. He also alleged that he was being targeted because of his Scheduled Caste background.

== Political career ==
According to some political analysts, Jakhar's strengths are related to his ‘clean-image’, articulate approach, and polite attitude.

=== Indian National Congress ===
Jakhar began his career as a member of the INC, first became a member of the Punjab Vidhan Sabha from the Abohar Assembly constituency in 2002. In 2007 and 2012, he was re-elected from Abohar. He became a Member of Parliament after winning a by-election in Gurdaspur. He lost in 2019 to Sunny Deol of the Bharatiya Janata Party. Jakhar served as the Leader of the Opposition in the Punjab Vidhan Sabha from 2012 to 2015 and as the President of the Punjab Pradesh Congress Committee (PPCC) from 2017 to 2021.

In 2021, after the ouster of Amarinder Singh as the Chief Minister of Punjab by the INC's leadership, Jakhar was a frontrunner to replace Singh as Chief Minister. However, Jakhar was opposed by Ambika Soni, a Rajya Sabha Member of Parliament from the INC, who suggested that the INC should choose a Sikh for the position of Chief Minister. In 2022, Jakhar stated that he is quitting from electoral politics; however, he will remain involved in party politics.

In 2022, Jakhar left the INC on 14 May, days after receiving a notice from the Congress leadership. Earlier in 2022, the Congress leadership removed Jakhar from all party positions after he criticised former Punjab chief minister Charanjit Singh Channi, referring to him as a liability after the PPCC lost the Punjab Legislative Assembly Election in 2022. The day Jakhar left the INC, he criticised the INC's leadership, the INC's leadership for supporting certain politicians in the party, the functioning of the INC and the party's ideology.

=== Bharatiya Janata Party ===
He joined the Bharatiya Janata Party (BJP) on 19 May 2022 in Delhi. On July 4, 2023, Jakhar was Appointed the President of BJP Punjab, which made him the only Punjab politician to have headed the state units of both the BJP and the INC. Jakhar campaigned during the 2024 Indian General Elections. In September 2024, it was reported that Jakhar has resigned as the President of BJP Punjab, due to differences and clashes with other BJP Punjab leaders and their working style. Later in the same month, BJP Punjab stated that the report on Jakhar's resignation is baseless. In November 2024, it was reported that Jakhar had resigned from the presidency and that BJP Punjab was having internal issues due to it. He also did not campaign during the November by-polls taking place in Punjab. Jakhar stated that he had submitted his resignation and it was the BJP's central leadership that would make a decision on it. In December 2024, Jakhar stated that his reasons for resigning were due to the BJP's performance in the 2024 General Elections in Punjab and that he had actually asked to resign before the elections but did not due to the upcoming elections.

In June 2025, Jakhar returned to active politics after a hiatus of 8 months by joining Jiwan Gupta at his nomination for the Ludhiana West Assembly constituency bypoll which is also in June 2025. After his return to active politics, Jakhar in June 2025, at the prayer meeting for the deceased political leader Sukhdev Singh Dhindsa, urged the various Shiromani Akali Dal political parties to unite. In July 2025, Jakhar stated that the BJP and the SAD should reform their electoral alliance, which had been broken in 2020 as a result of the farmers' protests against the 2020 Indian agriculture acts.

== Controversy ==
On 7 January 2017, Jakhar sent a complaint to the Punjab chief election officer alleging that local Shiromani Akali Dal leader Shivlal Doda and his nephew Waris / others used seven different mobile numbers while in a Fazilka prison.

== Personal life ==
Jakhar is married to Silvia Jakhar, a citizen of Switzerland and she is based in Delhi. Silvia is reported to remain away from Jakhar's political career.

Lok Sabha
Preceded by Vinod Khanna	Member of Parliament; Gurdaspur; 2017 – 2019	Succeeded by Sunny Deol
Party political offices
Preceded by Ashwani Kumar Sharma	President; Bharatiya Janata Party, Punjab; 2023 – present	Incumbent
Preceded by Amarinder Singh	President; Punjab Pradesh Congress Committee; 2017 – 2021	Succeeded by Navjot Singh Sidhu
