= Abohar Assembly constituency =

Legislative Assembly constituency in Punjab State, India

Coordinates: 30.15°N 74.2°E

Abohar
- Constituency No. 81 for the Punjab Legislative Assembly

Constituency details
- Country: India
- State: Punjab
- District: Fazilka
- Lok Sabha constituency: Firozpur
- Total electors: 178,416 (in 2022)
- Reservation: None

Member of Legislative Assembly
- 16th Punjab Legislative Assembly
- Incumbent Sandeep Jakhar
- Party: Independent
- Elected year: 2022

Abohar Assembly constituency (Sl. No.: 81) is a Punjab Legislative Assembly constituency in Fazilka district, Punjab state, India. Abohar assembly constituency is one of the 117 seats of Punjab Vidhan Sabha. This constituency is located in Fazilka district of Punjab and comes under the Firozpur (Lok Sabha constituency) seat. 28% Hindu Jat, 10% Jatt Sikh, 25% Dalit, 14% Bagri Kumhar, 10% Kamboj and 13% others lived there in this constituency.

== Members of Legislative Assembly ==
Most successful parties from Abohar Vidhan Sabha
1. INC (9 Times) (56.2%)
2. BJS (3 Times) (18.8%)
3. BJP (3 Times) (18.8%)
4. INC (I) (1 Time) (6.25%)

Election	Name	Party
1952	Chandi Ram	Indian National Congress
1957	Sahi Ram	Bharatiya Jana Sangh
1962	Chandi Ram	Indian National Congress
1967	Satya Dev	Bharatiya Jana Sangh
1969	Satya Dev	Bharatiya Jana Sangh
1972	Balram Jakhar	Indian National Congress
1977	Balram Jakhar	Indian National Congress
1980	Sajjan Kumar Jakhar	Indian National Congress (Indira)
1985	Arjan Singh	Bharatiya Janata Party
1992	Sajjan Kumar Jakhar	Indian National Congress
1997	Dr. Ram Kumar Goyal	Bharatiya Janata Party
2002	Sunil Jakhar	Indian National Congress
2007	Sunil Jakhar	Indian National Congress
2012	Sunil Jakhar	Indian National Congress
2017	Arun Narang	Bharatiya Janata Party
2022	Sandeep Jakhar	Indian National Congress

== Election results ==
=== 2027 ===
Punjab Assembly election, 2027: Abohar
Party	Candidate	Votes	%	±%
AAP				
AD (WPD)				New entry
INC				
BSP				
SAD				
BJP				
NOTA	None of the above			
Majority				
Turnout				

=== 2022 ===
Punjab Assembly election, 2022: Abohar
Party	Candidate	Votes	%	±%
INC	Sandeep Jakhar	49,924	37.70	▼3.7
AAP	Deep Kamboj	44,453	33.60	▲22.5
BJP	Arun Narang	21,534	16.30	▼27.7
SAD	Dr. Mahinder Kumar Rinwa	14,345	10.78	new
NOTA	None of the above	726	0.55	
Majority		5,471	4.1	
Turnout		133,102	74.5	
Registered electors		178,739		
INC gain from BJP		Swing	INC	

=== 2017 ===
Punjab Assembly election, 2017: Abohar
Party	Candidate	Votes	%	±%
BJP	Arun Narang	55,091	44.0	
INC	Sunil Jakhar	51,812	41.4	
AAP	Atul Nagpal	13,888	11.1	
NOTA	None of the above	1,212	0.8	
Majority		3,279	2.6	
Turnout		123,917	78.4	
Registered electors		159,660		
