= Sandeep Jakhar =

Indian politician

Member of the Punjab Legislative Assembly
- Incumbent
- Assumed office 2022
- Preceded by: Arun Narang
- Constituency: Abohar

Personal details
- Born: 21 May 1976 (age 50)
- Party: Independent
- Other political affiliations: Indian National Congress Suspended
- Spouse: Atsuko Jakhar
- Children: Meera Jakhar
- Parent: Surinder Jakhar (father)
- Relatives: Sunil Jakhar (Uncle)
- Education: Mayo College, Ajmer
- Profession: Agriculture

Sandeep Jakhar is an Indian politician and an independent politician. He is currently serving as a member of the Punjab Legislative Assembly from Abohar. He won the 2022 election from Abohar in 2022 Punjab Assembly Elections.

== Personal life ==
Sandeep belongs to a prominent Hindu Jat family from Abohar. His family has been associated with the Congress Party from three generations.Sandeep is an alumnus of Mayo College, Ajmer. Sandeep studied for two years in Switzerland before graduating from Miami. He worked as head of Country Club in Florida. He is married to Atsuko Jakhar.

Sandeep's father, Surinder Jakhar has served as chairman of Asia’s cooperative fertiliser giant IFFCO for four terms and chief of Asian Cooperative Alliance for two terms.

== Political career ==
His grandfather Balram Jakhar has served as the Speaker of the Lok Sabha, Governor of Madhya Pradesh and Union agriculture minister during the Narasimha Rao government. Balram Jakhar was also the longest serving Speaker of the Lok Sabha.

His uncle Sunil Jakhar is a 3-time MLA,1- time MP, former President of Bharatiya Janata Party, Punjab and former President of Punjab Pradesh Congress Committee.

Sandeep has served as district President of Youth Congress Unit in Punjab.

He was expelled from the Indian National Congress in 2023 for supporting the Bharatiya Janata Party.

== MLA ==
Sandeep contested his first Punjab Legislative Assembly elections in 2022 from his family's traditional seat Abohar and won by a margin of 5,471 votes. The Aam Aadmi Party gained a strong 79% majority in the sixteenth Punjab Legislative Assembly by winning 92 out of 117 seats in the 2022 Punjab Legislative Assembly election. MP Bhagwant Mann was sworn in as Chief Minister on 16 March 2022.

== Electoral Performance ==
=== 2022 ===
Punjab Assembly election, 2022: Abohar
Party	Candidate	Votes	%	±%
INC	Sandeep Jakhar	49,924	37.51	
AAP	Deep Kamboj	44,453	33.40	
SAD	Mohinder Kumar Rinwa	14,345	10.78	
BJP	Arun Narang	21,534	16.18	
Independent	Baljinder Singh	899	0.68	
NOTA	None of the above	726	0.55	
Majority				
Turnout		133,096		
Registered electors		178,739		
