= Jalalabad, Punjab Assembly constituency =

Constituency of the Punjab legislative assembly in India

Coordinates: 30.6°N 74.25°E

Jalalabad
- Constituency No. 79 for the Punjab Legislative Assembly

Constituency details
- Country: India
- State: Punjab
- District: Fazilka
- Lok Sabha constituency: Firozpur
- Total electors: 213,416 (in 2022)
- Reservation: None

Member of Legislative Assembly
- 16th Punjab Legislative Assembly
- Incumbent Jagdeep Kamboj Goldy
- Party: Aam Aadmi Party
- Elected year: 2022

Jalalabad Assembly constituency is a Punjab Legislative Assembly constituency in Fazilka district, Punjab state, India.

== Members of Legislative assembly ==
Most successful parties from Jalalabad, Punjab Vidhan Sabha
1. SAD (5 Times) (33.3%)
2. CPI (4 Times) (26.7%)
3. INC (4 Times) (26.7%)
4. AAP (1 Time) (6.67%)
5. INC (I) (1 Time) (6.67%)

Election	Member	Portrait	Party
1967	Prem Singh		Communist Party of India
1969	Lajinder Singh		Indian National Congress
1972	Mehtab Singh		Communist Party of India
1977	Mehtab Singh		Communist Party of India
1980	Manga Singh		Indian National Congress (Indira)
1985	Mehtab Singh		Communist Party of India
1992	Hans Raj Josan		Indian National Congress
1997	Sher Singh Ghubaya		Shiromani Akali Dal
2002	Hans Raj Josan		Indian National Congress
2007	Sher Singh Ghubaya		Shiromani Akali Dal
2009*	Sukhbir Singh Badal		Shiromani Akali Dal
2012	Sukhbir Singh Badal		Shiromani Akali Dal
2017	Sukhbir Singh Badal		Shiromani Akali Dal
2019*	Raminder Singh Awla		Indian National Congress
2022	Jagdeep Kamboj Goldy		Aam Aadmi Party

- * bypoll

== Election results ==
=== 2027 ===
Punjab Assembly election, 2027: Jalalabad, Punjab
Party	Candidate	Votes	%	±%
AAP	Jagdeep Kamboj Goldy			
AD (WPD)				New entry
INC				
BSP				
SAD				
BJP				
NOTA	None of the above			
Majority				
Turnout				

=== 2022 ===
Assembly Election 2022: Jalalabad, Punjab
Party	Candidate	Votes	%	±%
AAP	Jagdeep Kamboj Goldy	91,455	52.95	
SAD	Sukhbir Singh Badal	60,525	35.04	
INC	Mohan Singh Phalianwala	8,771	5.08	
BJP	Puran Chand	5,418	3.14	New
Independent	Surinder Singh	1,860	1.08	
SAD(A)	Gurmeet Singh	1,248	0.72	
NOTA	None of the above	830	0.48	
Majority		30,930	17.91	
Registered electors		213,416		
AAP gain from INC		Swing		

=== 2019 ===
By-election, 2019: Jalalabad, Punjab
Party	Candidate	Votes	%	±%
INC	Raminder Singh Awla	76,098		
SAD	Raj Singh Dibbipura	59,465		
AAP	Mohinder Singh	11,301		
IND	Jagdeep Kamboj Goldy	5,836		
NOTA	None of the above	704		
Majority				
Turnout		1,54,368	75.25	
INC gain from SAD		Swing		

=== 2017 ===
Assembly Election 2017: Jalalabad, Punjab
Party	Candidate	Votes	%	±%
SAD	Sukhbir Singh Badal	75,271	44.5	
AAP	Bhagwant Mann	56,771	33.6	
INC	Ravneet Singh Bittu	31,539	18.7	
NOTA	None of the above	1,112	0.60	
Majority		18,500	11.0	
Turnout		167,937	86.9	
Registered electors		194,511		
SAD hold				

=== 2012 ===
Punjab Assembly election, 2012:Jalalabad, Punjab
Party	Candidate	Votes	%	±%
SAD	Sukhbir Singh Badal	80,647	53.9	
Independent	Hans Raj Josan	30,401	20.3	
INC	Malkit Singh	17,970	12.0	
Majority		50,246	33.6	
Turnout		149,395	87.0	
Registered electors		149,395		
gain from		Swing		

=== 2009 ===
Punjab by election, 2009:Jalalabad, Punjab
Party	Candidate	Votes	%	±%
SAD	Sukhbir Badal	107,120		
INC	Hans Raj Josan	26,458		
Majority				
Turnout				
Registered electors				
gain from		Swing		

=== 2007 ===
Punjab Assembly election, 2007:Jalalabad, Punjab
Party	Candidate	Votes	%	±%
SAD	Sher Singh	89,085		
INC	Hans Raj Josan	45,008		
Majority				
Turnout				
Registered electors				
gain from		Swing		

=== 2002 ===
Punjab Assembly election, 2002:Jalalabad, Punjab
Party	Candidate	Votes	%	±%
INC	Hans Raj Josan	45,727		
SAD	Sher Singh	41,396		
Majority				
Turnout				
Registered electors				
gain from		Swing		

=== 1997 ===
Punjab Assembly election, 1997:Jalalabad, Punjab
Party	Candidate	Votes	%	±%
SAD	Sher Singh	42,844		
Independent	Hans Raj Josan	39,447		
Majority				
Turnout				
Registered electors				
gain from		Swing		

=== Previous results ===
Year	A C No.	Category	Name	Party	Votes	Runner up	Party	Votes
1992	93	GEN	Hans Raj Josan	INC	18,105	Sucha Singh	BSP	15,217
1985	93	GEN	Mehtab Singh	CPI	24,287	Manga Singh	INC	18,763
1980	93	GEN	Manga Singh	INC(I)	27,326	Mehtab Singh	CPI	17,586
1977	93	GEN	Mehtab Singh	CPI	29,926	Rajinder Singh	IND	12,131
1972	7	GEN	Mehtab Singh	CPI	39,909	Harbhajan Singh	SOP	9,723
1969	7	GEN	Lajinder Singh	INC	31,776	Bakhtawar Singh	BJS	11,772
1967	7	GEN	Prem Singh	CPI	20,046	Lajinder Singh	INC	19,378

== See also ==
- Punjab Legislative Assembly
