= Muktsar Assembly constituency =

Legislative Assembly constituency in Punjab State, India

Coordinates: 30.47°N 74.51°E

Sri Muktsar Sahib
- Constituency No. 86 for the Punjab Legislative Assembly

Constituency details
- Country: India
- State: Punjab
- District: Sri Muktsar Sahib
- Lok Sabha constituency: Firozpur
- Established: 1951
- Total electors: 188,889
- Reservation: None

Member of Legislative Assembly
- 16th Punjab Legislative Assembly
- Incumbent Jagdeep Singh Kaka Brar
- Party: Aam Aadmi Party
- Elected year: 2022

Sri Muktsar Sahib Assembly constituency (Sl. No.: 86) is a Punjab Legislative Assembly constituency in Sri Muktsar Sahib district, Punjab state, India. Since 2022, Jagdeep Singh Kaka Brar of Aam Aadmi Party is the MLA.

== List of MLAs ==
Most successful parties from Muktsar Vidhan Sabha
1. INC (8 Times) (53.3%)
2. SAD (4 Times) (26.7%)
3. AAP (1 Time) (6.67%)
4. AD – SFS (1 Time) (6.67%)
5. IND (1 Time) (6.67%)

Chronological list of members of Punjab Legislative Assembly from Sri Muktsar Sahib.

Election Year	Name	Political party (Alliance)
1951	Bhag Singh	Shiromani Akali Dal
1957	Harcharan Singh	Indian National Congress
1962	Harcharan Singh	Indian National Congress
1967	Guruev Singh	Akali Dal – Sant Fateh Singh Group
1972	Ujagar Singh	Indian National Congress
1977	Kanwarjit Singh	Indian National Congress
1980	Harchand Singh Brar	Shiromani Akali Dal
1985	Gurbinder Kaur Brar	INC
1987	President's Rule	Governor of Punjab
1992	Harcharan Singh	Indian National Congress
1997	Harnirpal Singh	Shiromani Akali Dal
2002	Sukhdarshan Singh	Independent
2007	Kanwarjit Singh	Indian National Congress
2012	Karan Kaur	Indian National Congress
2017	Kanwarjit Singh Barkandi	Shiromani Akali Dal
2022	Jagdeep Singh Kaka Brar	Aam Aadmi Party

== Election results ==
=== 2027 ===
Punjab Assembly election, 2027: Sri Muktsar Sahib
Party	Candidate	Votes	%	±%
AAP	Jagdeep Singh Kaka Brar			
AD (WPD)				New entry
INC				
BSP				
SAD				
BJP				
NOTA	None of the above			
Majority				
Turnout				

=== 2022 ===
2022 Assembly election: Sri Muktsar Sahib
Party	Candidate	Votes	%	±%
AAP	Jagdeep Singh Kaka Brar	76,321	51.09	▲28.52
SAD	Kanwarjit Singh Rozy Barkandi	42,127	28.20	▼2.32
INC	Karan Kaur Brar	14,290	9.57	▼15.53
BJP	Rajesh Pathela	10,634	7.2	New entry
Majority		34,194	22.89	
Turnout		149,390	78.9	
Registered electors		189,274		
AAP gain from SAD		Swing		

=== 2017 ===
Assembly Election, 2017: Sri Muktsar Sahib
Party	Candidate	Votes	%	±%
SAD	Kanwarjit Singh Rozy Barkandi	44,894	30.5	
INC	Karan Kaur	36,914	25.10	
AAP	Jagdeep Singh Kaka Brar	33,201	22.57	
Independent	Sukhdarshan Singh Mrar	28,204	19.2	
NOTA	None of the Above	858	0.5	
Majority		7,980	5.5	
Turnout		146,226	83.5	
Registered electors		176,112		

== See also ==
- List of constituencies of the Punjab Legislative Assembly
- Sri Muktsar Sahib district
- Punjab Legislative Assembly
