= Sher Singh Ghubaya =

Indian politician

Member of Parliament, Lok Sabha
- Incumbent
- Assumed office 4 June 2024
- Preceded by: Sukhbir Singh Badal
- Constituency: Firozpur
- In office 16 May 2009 – 23 May 2019
- Preceded by: Zora Singh Maan
- Succeeded by: Sukhbir Singh Badal
- Constituency: Firozpur

Personal details
- Born: 10 June 1962 (age 64) Fazilka, Punjab, India
- Party: Indian National Congress
- Other political affiliations: Shiromani Akali Dal(till 2019)
- Spouse: Krishna Rani
- Children: 2 sons and 2 daughters
- As of 4 November, 2017

Sher Singh Ghubaya (born 10 June 1962) is an Indian politician who is a member of the Lok Sabha, elected from Firozpur constituency of Punjab in 2009 and 2014, as a member of Akali Dal. He was also elected to 18th Lok Sabha from Firozpur. He is currently a member of the Indian National Congress. In March 2019, he left Shiromani Akali Dal and joined the Indian National Congress.

He had represented Jalalabad seat in Punjab Vidhan Sabha as well when he was with Akali Dal.

== Early life and background ==
Ghubaya was born in Punjab to Narain Singh. He belongs to the Rai Sikh community, which has a significant population in the Firozpur and Fazilka regions of Punjab. He completed his matriculation from Government High School, Lamochar Kalan, in 1978. Before entering electoral politics, he worked as a muneem (accountant) at a brick kiln and was involved in agriculture.

== Personal life ==
Ghubaya is married to Krishna Rani. His son, Davinder Singh Ghubaya, entered electoral politics and was elected to the Punjab Legislative Assembly from Fazilka in the 2017 Punjab Legislative Assembly election as a Congress candidate.

== Political career ==
=== Punjab Legislative Assembly ===
Ghubaya began his electoral political career with the Shiromani Akali Dal. He was first elected to the Punjab Legislative Assembly from the Jalalabad constituency in 1997.

He contested the 2002 Punjab Assembly election but lost to Congress candidate Hans Raj Josan. He returned to the Assembly after winning the Jalalabad constituency in the 2007 election.

In 2008, he vacated the Jalalabad Assembly seat for Shiromani Akali Dal president Sukhbir Singh Badal, who subsequently entered the Punjab Legislative Assembly through a by-election.

=== Member of Parliament ===
==== 15th Lok Sabha (2009–2014) ====
In the 2009 Indian general election, Ghubaya contested from the Firozpur parliamentary constituency as a Shiromani Akali Dal candidate. He defeated Congress candidate Jagmeet Singh Brar and was elected to the 15th Lok Sabha.

During this parliamentary term, he raised questions concerning the Rai Sikh community, Scheduled Caste classification, reservation, farmers' compensation and development in border areas. He also raised issues concerning railway infrastructure and employment.

According to PRS Legislative Research, he attended 64% of parliamentary sittings during this term and participated in 12 debates.

==== 16th Lok Sabha (2014–2019) ====
Ghubaya was re-elected from Firozpur in the 2014 general election, defeating Congress candidate Sunil Jakhar.

During his second parliamentary term, he served on parliamentary committees, including the Standing Committee on Defence and the Standing Committee on Social Justice and Empowerment.

He raised parliamentary questions concerning agricultural production, groundwater, Scheduled Caste representation, reservation, healthcare, railway development and employment.

PRS Legislative Research recorded his attendance at 66% of parliamentary sittings between June 2014 and February 2019. He participated in 44 debates and asked 203 parliamentary questions.

==== 18th Lok Sabha (2024–present) ====
In the 2024 Indian general election, the Indian National Congress again nominated Ghubaya from Firozpur.

He won the election with 266,626 votes, defeating Aam Aadmi Party candidate Jagdeep Singh Kaka Brar, who received 263,384 votes. His victory margin was 3,242 votes. The result was notable because four major candidates representing Congress, AAP, BJP and SAD received relatively similar vote shares.

With this victory, Ghubaya returned to Parliament for his third term.

As a member of the 18th Lok Sabha, he has raised issues concerning agricultural infrastructure, border-area development, healthcare, employment, groundwater contamination, Scheduled Caste representation and rural development.

According to PRS Legislative Research data covering 24 June 2024 to 13 August 2026, his parliamentary attendance was 86%, compared with the national average of 85%.
