= Raminder Singh Awla =

Indian politician

Member of the Legislative Assembly
- In office 16 October 2019 – 10 March 2022
- Governor: Banwarilal Purohit
- Preceded by: Sukhbir Singh Badal
- Succeeded by: Jagdeep Kamboj Goldy

Personal details
- Born: 20 July 1974 (age 51) Guru Har Sahai, Punjab, India
- Party: Indian National Congress

Raminder Singh Awla is an Indian politician and former member of the Punjab Legislative Assembly from Jalalabad constituency. He won the 2019 Jalalabad by-election on the Indian National Congress ticket by defeating Shiromani Akali Dal candidate Raj Singh Dibbipura by 16,000 votes. His former professions before entering politics were in business and agriculture. He is married and has two children. Notably, he is the first candidate in 17 years which brought the Congress Party to victory in the Jalalabad Constituency.
