= Zora Singh Maan =

Indian politician

Member of Parliament, Lok Sabha
- In office 1998–2009
- Preceded by: Mohan Singh Phalianwala
- Succeeded by: Sher Singh Ghubaya
- Constituency: Firozpur

Personal details
- Born: 18 June 1940 Firozpur, Punjab, British India
- Died: 27 June 2010 (aged 70) New Delhi, India
- Party: SAD
- Spouse: Sarabjeet Kaur
- Children: 2 sons and 2 daughters
- As of 27 June, 2010

Zora Singh Maan (born 18 June 1940) was a member of the 14th Lok Sabha of India. He represented the Firozpur constituency of Punjab and was a member of the Shiromani Akali Dal (SAD) political party.
