= Punjab Urban Planning and Development Authority =

Indian government agency

The Punjab Urban Planning and Development Authority is a government agency in the Indian state of Punjab.

It is a statutory body set up on 1 July 1995 under the Punjab Regional and Town Planning and Development Act, 1995, an enactment of the State Legislature of Punjab. PUDA is an apex body, responsible for the planning and development of urban and sub-urban areas in the whole State.

Then, Sh. Som Parkash IAS was posted as Chief Administrator PUDA, the post he previously held from April 2006 to April 2007 during Congress Regime. In March 2009 he decided to resign from IAS to contest the Parliamentary Elections From Hoshiarpur on the ticket of BJP, which he lost by narrow margin.

In 2015, the housing department proposed to merge the Punjab Urban Planning and Development Authority (PUDA) but it was not implemented.

== Headquarters ==
The iconic PUDA Bhawan-official headquarters of the Punjab Urban Planning and Development Authority, initiated by KBS Sidhu, an IAS officer, signifies the towering role of PUDA vis-a-vis Mohali.
