= Panjkosi =

- Village
- Location in Punjab, India Panjkosi (India)
- Coordinates: 30.171992°N 74.063559°E
- Country: India
- State: Punjab
- District: Fazilka

Languages
  - Official: Punjabi
- Time zone: UTC+5:30 (IST)
- Vehicle registration: PB-22

Panjkosi is a village in the Western part of Punjab, India.
