= Amandeep Singh Musafir =

Indian politician

MLA, Punjab Legislative Assembly
- Incumbent
- Assumed office 2022
- Constituency: Balluana
- Majority: Aam Aadmi Party

Personal details
- Party: Aam Aadmi Party

Amandeep Singh 'Goldy' Musafir is an Indian politician and the MLA representing the Balluana Assembly constituency in the Punjab Legislative Assembly. He is a member of the Aam Aadmi Party. He was elected as the MLA in the 2022 Punjab Legislative Assembly election.

He was a member of Congress party. He joined AAP in March 2021.

== MLA ==
The Aam Aadmi Party gained a strong 79% majority in the sixteenth Punjab Legislative Assembly by winning 92 out of 117 seats in the 2022 Punjab Legislative Assembly election. MP Bhagwant Mann was sworn in as Chief Minister on 16 March 2022.

Committee assignments of Punjab Legislative Assembly

- Member (2022–23) Committee on Petitions
- Member (2022–23) Committee on Co-operation and its allied activities

== Electoral performance ==
Punjab Assembly election, 2022: Balluana
Party	Candidate	Votes	%	±%
AAP	Amandeep Singh Musafir	58,893	40.91	
BJP	Vandana Sangwal	39,720	27.59	New entry
INC	Rajinder Kaur	22,747	15.8	
SAD	Prithi Ram Megh	17,816	12.38	
Independent	Surinder Singh Khalsa	1,988	1.38	
Independent	Manjit Kaur	393	0.27	
NOTA	None of the above	1,236	0.86	
Majority		19,173	13.32	
Turnout				
Registered electors		183,929		

State Legislative Assembly
Preceded by -	Member of the Punjab Legislative Assembly from Balluana Assembly constituency 2022 –	Incumbent
