= Satyadev =

Satyadev or Satyadeo is an Indian given name. The name means 'lord of truth'. Notable people with the name include:

Satyadeo

- Satyadeo Narain Arya, Indian politician from the BJP party in Bihar
- Satyadeo Ram, left-wing Indian politician of Bihar
- Satyadeow Sawh (1955–2006), Hindu politician in Guyana

Satyadev

- Satyadev Dubey (1936–2011), Indian theatre director, actor, playwright, screenwriter, and film actor and director
- Satyadev Katare (1955–2016), Indian politician of Madhya Pradesh
- Satyadev Kushwaha, Indian politician from the JDU party in Bihar
- Satyadev Pachauri, Indian politician of Uttar Pradesh
- Satyadev Prasad (born 1979), Indian archer
- Satyadev, Telugu actor
