= Adesh Kanwarjit Singh Brar =

Indian politician

Adesh Kanwarjit Singh Brar MLA

Member of the Punjab Legislative Assembly for Sri Muktsar Sahib
- In office 1977–2012

Personal details
- Born: Adesh Kanwarjit Singh Brar; 15 October 1949 Amritsar, Punjab, India
- Died: 4 March 2012 (aged 62) New Delhi, Delhi, India
- Cause of death: Cancer
- Citizenship: Indian
- Party: Indian National Congress
- Spouse: Karan Kaur Brar
- Education: The Doon School
- Profession: Politician, Agriculturist, Farmer

Adesh Kanwarjit Singh Brar (15 October 1949 – 4 March 2012) was an Indian farmer, politician and Congress MLA from the Punjab state of India. He was the son of former Chief Minister of Punjab, Harcharan Singh Brar. He completed his schooling from The Doon School (1957). Became an MLA in 1977, 2007 respectively.

== Personal life ==
Adesh Kanwarjit Singh Brar was born on 15 October 1949 in Amritsar, East Punjab, Union of India into a Punjabi Jatt Sikh family of the Brar Sidhu clan to parents Harcharan Singh Brar (1922–2009) and Gurbrinder Kaur Brar (1922–2013). An alumnus of The Doon School, he married his wife Karan Kaur Brar and has 3 sons, the eldest of whom is Tegbir Singh Brar, who manages the family's horse-breeding farm, Dashmesh Stud in Punjab.

== Death ==
Brar died at his home in New Delhi on 4 March 2012 after a long fight with cancer at the age of 63 years. He was cremated at his Native village Sarai Naga, Sri Muktsar Sahib.
