= Navdeep Asija =

Indian scientist

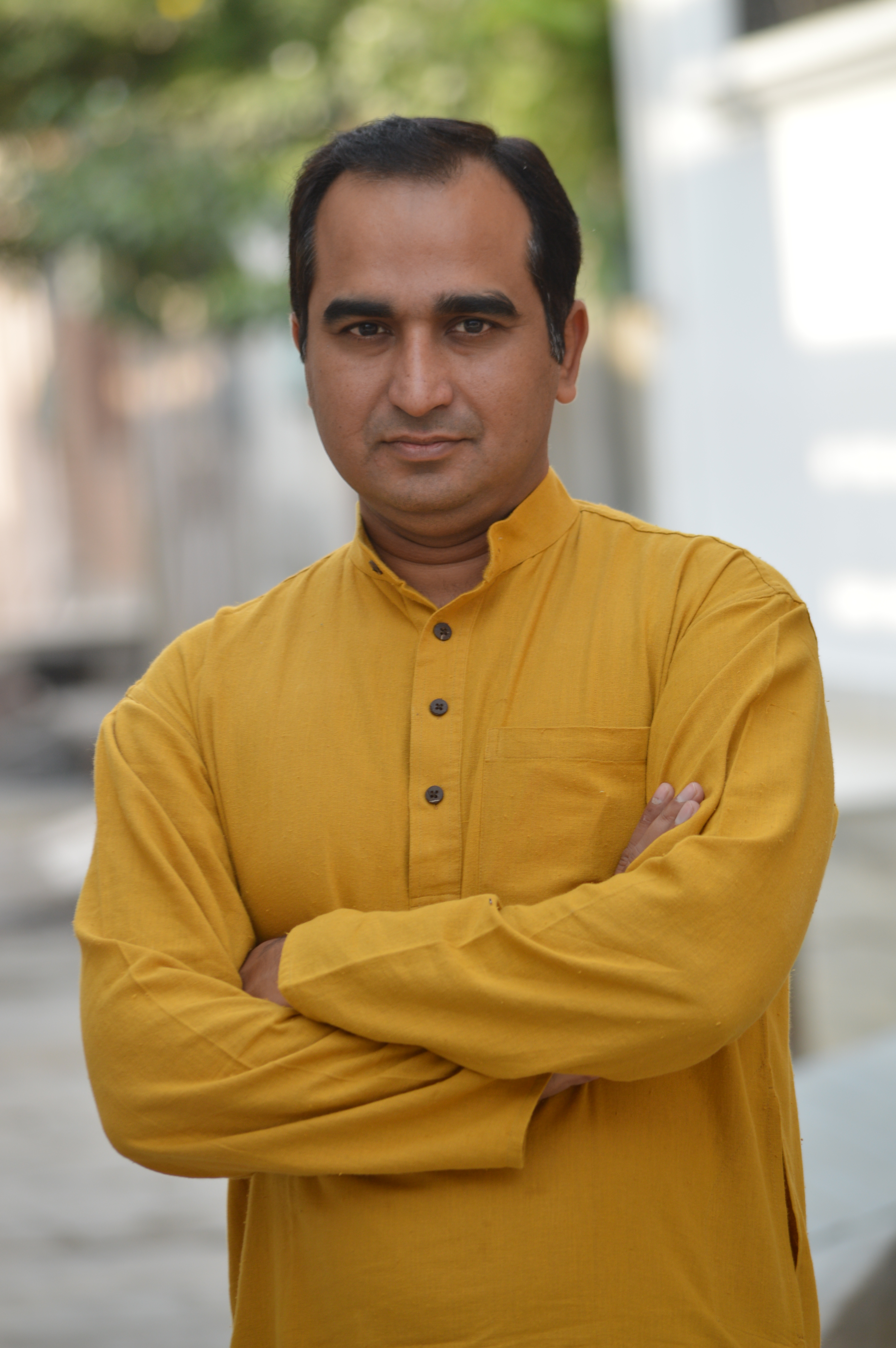
- Born: Fazilka
- Citizenship: India
- Education: Indian Institute of Technology Delhi; Guru Nanak Dev Engineering College, Ludhiana
- Known for: transportation, Non Motor Transportation, Road Safety
- Awards: National Award of Excellence in 2011 by Ministry of Urban Development, Government of India
- Scientific career
- Fields: transportation, renewable resources
- Thesis: Road traffic safety
- Doctoral advisor: Geetam Tiwari
- Website: Navdeep Asija

Navdeep Asija is the founder of dial-a-cycle rickshaw concept known as Ecocabs and won the 2011 National Award of Excellence by Ministry of Urban Development, Government of India.

Asija holds a Ph.D. degree in road safety from the Indian Institute of Technology Delhi and is currently serving the state of Punjab as Traffic Advisor to Punjab Government appointed by the Punjab and Haryana High Court and has been associated with Home Affairs and Justice, State of Punjab, India.

Asija's largest impact is in the development of the Ecocab concept, which is a dial-a-cycle-rickshaw equivalent to normal cab services accomplished with gasoline-powered automobiles. The recent development of advanced IT tools and the spread of cell phones have made it possible to balance the supply and demand of passengers and rickshaw taxis via a distributed fleet and automation. Asija demonstrated the concept of Ecocabs first in Fazilka, a district headquarters of the Punjab State, which is located near India-Pakistan Border.

The rickshaw program decreased greenhouse gas emissions by reducing the use of fossil fuels for transporting passengers, while at the same time reducing the startup costs for entrepreneurs performing taxi services.

== Car free and non-motor transport and "Right to Walk" movement in Punjab, India ==
He is a pioneer to start Car-free movement and promotion of non-motorised transport in Punjab state of India. His advocacy tool helped city municipal council to decongest the major commercial hub, the clock tower market area of the city Fazilka into a pedestrian by establishing India's first car free zone. Later the same concept was taken up by the Punjab and Haryana High Court in the form of Sua sponte, Public Interest Litigation, and asked the authorities to identify and establish vehicle free areas in each town and city of Punjab including Sector 17 of Union Territory of Chandigarh Punjab. Chandigarh is a capital city for the state of Punjab and Haryana of India.

In his recent public interest litigation he sought directions from the Punjab and Haryana High Court for enforcement of "right to walk" while claiming that it was part of "right to life" under Article 21 of Constitution of India.

== Awards and Recognitions ==
- Best Citizen Award by City Administration of Fazilka for contribution in the area of Road Safety on the occasion of Republic Day 2011.
- National Award of Excellence by Ministry of Urban Development, Government of India for Ecocabs in 2011
- His Fazilka Ecocabs venture qualified in the World's Top 15 for MobiPrize. MobiPrize is an award for entrepreneurial ventures in sustainable transportation. Created by the University of Michigan SMART initiative with the generous support of the Rockefeller Foundation in 2012.
- Geometric designed work on "Gazipur flyover, Delhi (on NH-24 bypass and Road Number 56)" won Vishawakarma National Award for best Project in Urban Transport Category and its integration with non motor transport facilities for the year 2012.
- His venture Ecocab-Dial a Rickshaw, received Runner up Volvo Sustainable Mobility Award 2013 for unique Initiative.
- Promising Active Transport Social Entrepreneurs by Embarq India for Ecocabs in the year 2015.
- Listed in the list of 30 Extraordinary Indians, “who made the difference in what India needs and citizens have decided to make it their life's mission to provide it” leading Magazine and Media Group of India “India Today” on the occasion of their 68th Independence Day Special Issue (2015).

== See also ==
- Demand responsive transport
