= Sukhbir Singh Badal =

Indian politician (born 1962)

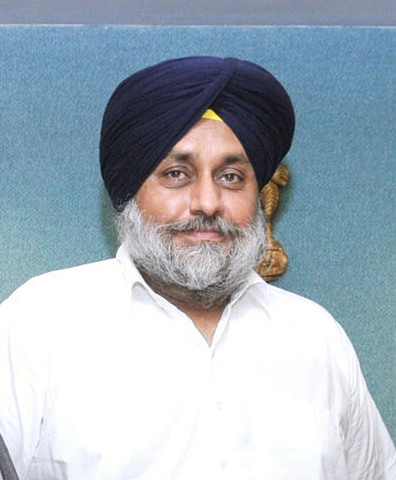
- Badal in 2016

Member of Parliament, Lok Sabha
- In office 23 May 2019 – 4 June 2024
- Preceded by: Sher Singh Ghubaya
- Succeeded by: Sher Singh Ghubaya
- Constituency: Firozpur
- In office 13 May 2004 — 16 May 2009
- Preceded by: Jagmeet Singh Brar
- Succeeded by: Paramjit Kaur Gulshan
- Constituency: Faridkot
- In office 10 May 1996 — 26 April 1999
- Preceded by: Jagmeet Singh Brar
- Succeeded by: Jagmeet Singh Brar
- Constituency: Faridkot

Deputy Chief Minister of Punjab
- In office 10 August 2009 – 11 March 2017
- Succeeded by: Sukhjinder Singh Randhawa Om Parkash Soni
- In office 21 January 2009 – 1 July 2009
- Preceded by: Rajinder Kaur Bhattal; March 2007

Union Minister of State for Industry
- In office 20 March 1998 – 13 October 1999
- Preceded by: Murasoli Maran
- Succeeded by: Murasoli Maran

Member of Punjab Legislative Assembly
- In office 21 August 2009 — 23 May 2019
- Preceded by: Sher Singh Ghubaya
- Succeeded by: Raminder Singh Awla
- Constituency: Jalalabad

Personal details
- Born: Sukhbir Singh; 9 July 1962 (age 64) Faridkot, Punjab, India
- Party: Shiromani Akali Dal
- Other political affiliations: National Democratic Alliance (1998–2020)
- Spouse: Harsimrat Kaur Badal
- Children: 3
- Relatives: Majithia family, Badal family, Kairon family
- As of 22 September, 2006

Sukhbir Singh Badal (born 9 July 1962) is an Indian politician and businessman who served twice as the Deputy Chief Minister of Punjab and is currently the president of Shiromani Akali Dal, and was a member of Parliament from the Firozpur Lok Sabha constituency. He is the son of Parkash Singh Badal, who has served five times as the Chief Minister of Punjab. He is influential over the Sikh organisations of the Shiromani Gurdwara Parbandhak Committee. Badal and his family have ownership stakes in an array of businesses- including real estate, transport and other activities.

Under his leadership, the Shiromani Akali Dal witnessed a historic decline in its electoral performance, notably losing its status as a major political force in the Punjab Legislative Assembly during the 2017 and 2022 elections.

== Early and personal life ==
Sukhbir Singh Badal was born on 9 July 1962 in a Dhillon Jatt Sikh family in the city Faridkot, Punjab. His mother was Surinder Kaur. Initially, he was educated at The Lawrence School, Sanawar. He completed an M.A. in economics from Panjab University Chandigarh from 1980 to 1984, and an M.B.A. from California State University, Los Angeles.

He married Harsimrat Kaur Badal on 21 November 1991. She is also a politician and a Member of Parliament of India from Bathinda Lok Sabha constituency since 2009, and was the union food processing minister under Prime Minister Narendra Modi until 17 May 2020.

His son Anantbir Singh Badal made his first political appearance in 2019 before the Indian general election.

== Political career ==
Sukhbir Singh Badal was a member of the 11th and 12th Lok Sabha, representing Faridkot. He was Union Minister of State for Industry in Second Vajpayee Ministry during 1998 to 1999. He was also a member of Rajya Sabha during 2001 to 2004. In 2004, he was re-elected from Faridkot for 14th Lok Sabha. He became the President of Akali Dal in January 2008. A year later in January 2009, he was sworn in as the Deputy Chief Minister of Punjab. He was not the Member of Punjab Vidhan Sabha at that time. He resigned in July 2009, upon the completion of six-month period available for contesting elections for the assembly, during which he didn't contest any elections. He was again appointed Deputy Chief Minister in August 2009 after winning by-elections from Jalalabad Assembly constituency.

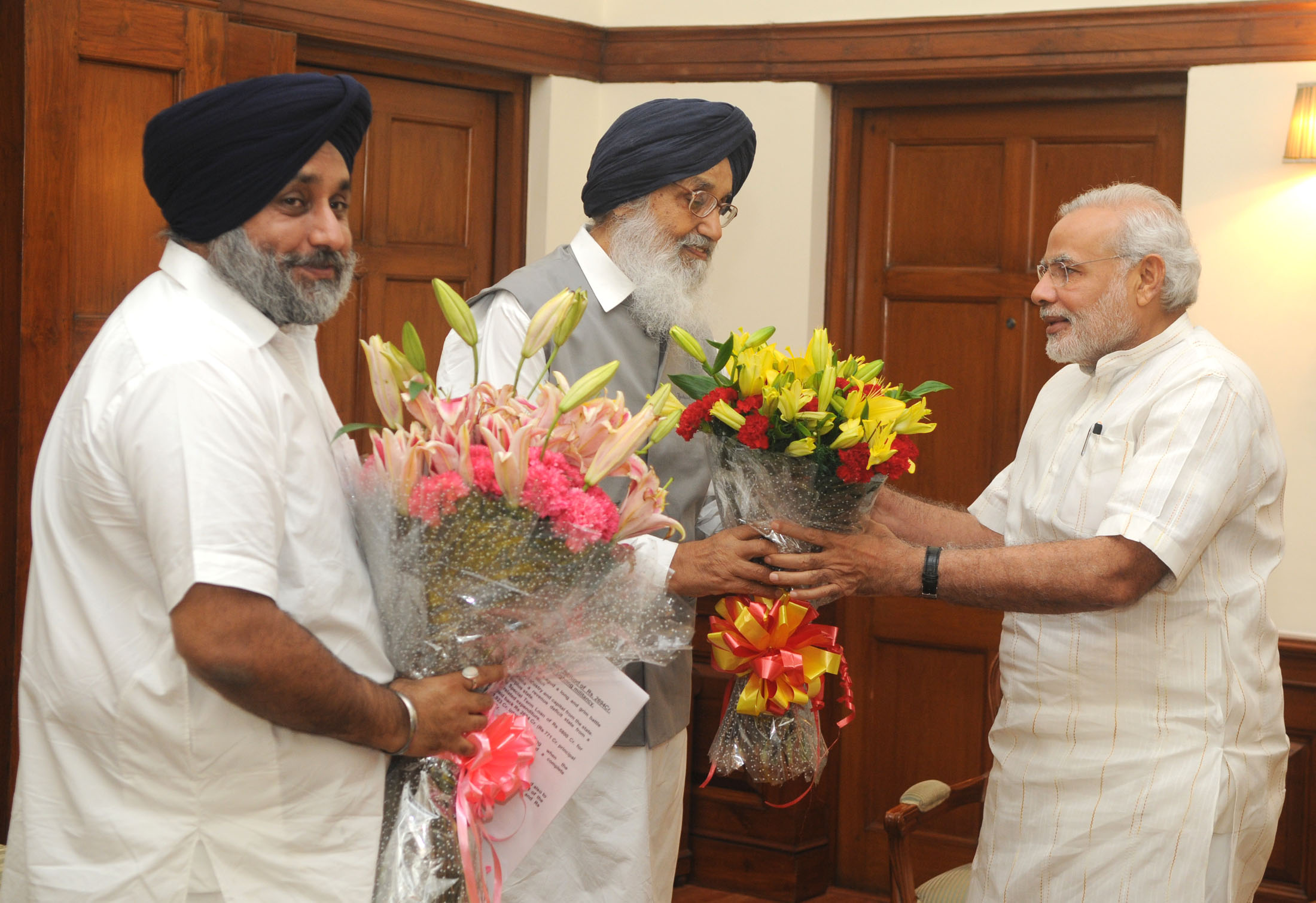
Badal with Parkash Singh Badal and Prime Minister Narendra Modi

=== 2012 Punjab elections ===
Akali Dal-BJP combined secured victory in the 2012 Punjab elections, beating anti-incumbency for the first time in Punjab. Sukhbir was re-elected from Jalalabad and remained Deputy Chief Minister. In the new government he held portfolio of Home, Governance Reforms, Housing, Excise and Taxation, Investment Promotion, Sports and Youth Services Welfare and Civil Aviation. This victory and later victory in Delhi Sikh Gurdwara Management Committee elections in January 2013 elevated the position of Sukhbir Singh Badal as an important leader in politics.

=== Leader of Opposition ===
==== 2017 Punjab elections ====
Badal defeated Bhagwant Mann of Aam Aadmi Party and Ravneet Singh Bittu of Indian Natioanal Congress in 2017 Assembly Elections. SAD and BJP alliance lost the majority to Congress. In 2019, he was elected as Member Parliament of Ferozpur Lok Sabha Constituency by defeating Sher Singh Ghubaya of INC by securing more than 600,000 votes on 23 May 2019.

==== 2022 Punjab elections ====
Badal was the president of Akali Dal during the 2022 Punjab Legislative Assembly election. Badal contested from the Jalalabad Assembly constituency and lost the election to Jagdeep Kamboj Goldy of Aam Aadmi Party. Badal lost by a margin of 30,374 Votes. SAD BSP alliance contested in all 117 seats, and won 3 seats. SAD finished on third spot behind AAP and INC.

=== Detentions and Protests ===
==== Detentions ====
He was arrested over the 2015 Kotkapura firing case, although he was let go due to lack of evidence against Badal.

Later in 2020 he was detained for protesting against the corruption of health minister Balbir Singh Sidhu outside Chief Minister Captain Amarinder Singh's house. Before his detainment he stated, "There is scam in vaccination, there is scam in Fateh Kit, there is scam in SC scholarship, farmers' land is being acquired" and then was dragged away by the Punjab Police.

In 2021 during the 2020-2021 Indian farmers' protest, Sukhbir Singh Badal and his wife Harsimrat Kaur Badal were detained by the Delhi Police as they led a protest march in the national capital to mark the first anniversary of the passage of three contentious farm laws.

In October 2023, Sukhbir Singh Badal was detained by police in Chandigarh. The detention occurred during a protest march to the official residence of Punjab Chief Minister Bhagwant Mann concerning the Sutlej Yamuna Link canal issue. He accused Mann is giving away the state's river water to Haryana and Rajasthan to gain political advantages in upcoming elections.

==== Protests ====
Every year since 1999, Sukhbir Singh Badal protested against the 1984 Anti-Sikh riots and for the Indian Government to give justice for the victims.

In 2015, Badal had protested against the Indian Government over the keeping of Sikh prisoners in jail, including the assassins of Chief Minister Beant Singh.

In 2017 he protested against 4 Akali politicians not receiving clearance to contest in the Punjab elections. He received an 'FIR' over blocking the Ferozepur-Ludhiana, Amritsar-Bathinda, Bathinda-Mansa, Chandigarh-Mansa, Jalandhar-Amritsar and Kharar-Chandigarh roads.

From 2020 to 2022 he protested and received multiple legal cases for protesting during the 2020-2021 Indian farmers' protest.

Sukhbir Singh Badal slammed Sikh preacher and radical Amritpal Singh for using the Adi Guru Granth as a shield during his protests in early 2023. Although he also protested against the detainment of Sikh youth during Amritpal Singh's manhunt and the unofficial 'emergency' imposed by Bhagwant Mann.

Like his father, Badal vehemently opposed the construction of the Sutlej Yamuna link canal and always supported the farmers of Punjab on the issue.

=== Controversies ===
==== Encounters and Extrajudicial Killings ====
Sukhbir Singh Badal employed many officers who were allegedly part of the killing and false encounters of innocent Sikhs, including promoting Mohammad Izhar Alam and Sumedh Singh Saini to high positions along with hundreds of others. Izhar Alam had a private army of men who killed innocent people on the behest of the Indian Government known as the “Alam Special Forces”. Badal had promoted Sumedh Saini in the police who later had ordered the firing on innocent Sikhs in the Kotkapura incident.

==== Kotkapura Firing ====
Many Sikhs protested against him for the Kotkapura firing case and asked him to apologise publicly, the Shiromani Akali Dal (Sanyukt) separated from the main Shiromani Akali Dal for the same reason. In late 2023 he made a public apology to all Sikhs in front of the Akal Takht declaring that he would imprison the culprits if the Shiromani Akali Dal ever came to power in Punjab. Many politicians from the Shiromani Akali Dal (Sanyukt) and Delhi Sikh Gurdwara Management Committee rejoined the mainstream Shiromani Akali Dal, such as Manjit Singh GK, rejoined his party.

==== Orbit Aviation Incident ====
In April 2015, a teenage girl died and her mother was seriously injured when they were molested and thrown from a running bus near Gil village in Moga district. The bus was operated by Orbit Aviation, a company in which Badal has stake. Subsequently, it was revealed by news reports that the Chief Minister of Punjab gave the girl's father ₹3 million in compensation.

==== Tankhaiya Declaration by Akal Takht ====
‌On 13 ‌December 2024, ‌November Akal‌ ‌takht Jathedar ("supreme spokesman or issuer of Sikh affairs") released an alteration within the presentment of other prudent leaders of Shiromani Akali Dal after declaring him as a Tankhaiya and pervasively‌ from ‌today onward, no Sikh can communicate with or maintain relationships with one who is declared tankhaiya till their "atonement", which he did after service at the Golden Temple for a week.

==== Nepotism and Politics ====
He has borne the brunt of criticism from supporters of the Shiromani Akali Dal that he turned the party into a nepotistic and dynast party from its roots of a Democratic and Panth-centric party. The Badal family has also been accused of shifting the focus of the Shiromani Akali Dal from Panth to Punjab and hence destroying the old party of Master Tara Singh. The party President for the past 30 years have been Parkash Singh Badal and Sukhbir Singh Badal- after the complete losses to AAP and the INC in 2022 Legislative and 2024 General elections many party members took to protest and many left. The Jhundan Reforms Committee report under Iqbal Singh Jhundan was prepared with steps to make the party succeed and continue as a representative of Punjab; but Sukhbir Singh Badal did not accept it.

==== Splinter Parties and Vote Decline ====
A rebel Akali Dal formed within the party including Manpreet Singh Ayali, Prem Singh Chandumajra, Iqbal Singh Jhundan and Parminder Singh Dhindsa. While Sukhbir had announced his support for the NDA candidate Droupadi Murmu during the Presidential poll, Ayali's party had boycotted the election. The Shiromani Gurdwara Parbandhak Committee and the Akal Takht also assumed an autonomous role while dealing with the Akali Dal; often the Jathedar slammed the party for going from working for farmers and labourers to capitalists. His promise to establish party units in all states having Sikh populations outside Punjab was also not fulfilled, and the Shiromani Akali Dal stopped their work for upliftment of Dalits in Punjab. At the same time it has been predicted that Akali Dal (Waris Punjab De), headed by Amritpal Singh, Manpreet Singh Ayali and Sarabjeet Singh Khalsa, would have a higher vote margin than the original Shiromani Akali Dal if facing alone in Punjab in 2027.

In the 2024 General election the party got a lower vote percentage than the Bharatiya Janata Party; and lower percentage than ever before and radicals received more support and seats. According to most political experts, the reason for the Akali Dal's failure was lack of campaigning and lack of faith in the party.

==== Assassination Attempts ====
In December, 2024 a man named Narain Singh Chaura, an associate of jailed assassin Jagtar Singh Hawara, had opened fire on Sukhbir Singh Badal in the Golden Temple but missed.

On 13 August 2026, he was attacked near a Gurdwara in Nanded, Maharashtra by a man with a knife.

== Businesses and real estate ==
=== Investments ===
Badal and his family have direct or indirect interests in any array of businesses. Badal holds a majority stake in the Punjabi language PTC television network. Badal and his family are also major stakeholders in Orbit Aviation, Dabwali Transport, Indo-Canadian Transport Company, Metro Eco Green Resorts, Saanjh Foundation, Falcon Properties, Punjab Animal Breeders, Gurbaz Media, G-Next Media, Rajdhani Express, Azad Hoshiarpur, Taj Travels, PTC Group and Orbit Resorts. He has been accused of enriching private transport companies, which he has a stake in, while the state transport department has deteriorated. The Oberoi Sukhvilas Spa Resort in New Chandigarh is owned by and named after Sukhbir Badal.

He was accused of running Punjab like a Pvt. Limited company instead of a state. Sukhbir Singh Badal's business and Ponty Chadha (supported by Captain Amarinder Singh) were at crosshairs with each other to dominate Punjab's business and industry- after the latter's death it led to Badal's dominance. Bikram Singh Majithia (Badal's brother-in-law) owns Saraya Industries, which has operations in liquor and energy. Badal's other brother-in-law Adesh Pratap Singh Kairon has majority shares in Shivalik Telecom. Deep Malhotra heads the liquor-making Oasis Group and is an ex-Akali Dal MLA. Shiv Lal Doda set up Gagan Wines and was the Akali Dal local leader in Abohar. The stone crushing industry was dominated by Kuldeep Singh Makkar, who is the brother of ex-Akali Dal MLA Sarabjit Singh Makkar. “Out of the 84 luxury bus permits operating in Punjab, at least 52 are with transport companies patronised by the Badals.”

A new cable distribution network—Fastway Transmission Private Ltd— usurped the main three networks Hathway (belonging to Mumbai’s Rahejas), Zee’s Wires & Wireless India Ltd, and Digicable. Fastway too has a Badal connection. Between 2010 and 2015, Jagjit Singh Kohli and Yogesh Shah were directors on Fastway’s board. Their names, incidentally, also show up in the statutory filings of Sukhbir Singh Badal’s two media companies—Gur-Baz Media and G-Next Media. G-Next owns the PTC Group of television channels. In 2014, Gur-Baz owned 99.98% shares in G-Next. Orbit Resorts owned 99.98% shares in Gur-Baz. Sukhbir Badal owned 67.32% of Orbit Resorts. He is alleged to own 501 crore INR in net capital in India and 3,825 crore INR abroad, though he won the case.

This did not include Orbit Resorts in which he has a majority stake in, wherein the annual turnover is 245 crore INR, which was in court for cronyism due to Om Prakash Chautala’s hand in the resort’s development in Haryana, who were allies with the Badals. Sukhbir Badal’s father-in-law was the first director of the company. Orbit Resorts also has subsidiaries in aviation and media, which were only floated when the Badals came into power in 2007. Chautala also allegedly helped him receive a 350-acre plot of land in Sirsa.

=== Alleged Foreign Assets ===
His alleged properties abroad include the allegations include apartments and farmland in California, Texas and New York, luxury properties in the United Kingdom, Canada, and bank accounts in Australia, New Zealand and Switzerland and “black money” in Mauritius, Hong Kong and the Cook Islands. For example Orbit Aviation gave a loan to restaurant Wimpy’s founder Kanwaljit Singh Dhillon’s shell company in Hong Kong to invest in Britain, it was alleged to have been black money. An ex-President of the Shiromani Akali Dal in the United States alleged that Badal also indirectly owners a share in parking lots and night clubs in New York, and multiple large farms in the United States of America.

=== Alleged Narcotics Trafficking ===
Though unproven and possibly defamation; it has been alleged that Badal was personally involved in the drug problem that started roughly at the same time as Badal’s term had started. It has been contested in High Court that his brother-in-law Bikram Singh Majithia was directly involved in spreading drugs in Punjab, he was also jailed for the same, and confessions from various drug lords have pointed to Majithia’s hand in the scandal- his net worth is said to be 700 crore INR.

== See also ==
- Politics of Punjab, India
- Master Tara Singh
- Parkash Singh Badal
