= Rajinder Kaur =

Indian journalist and politician

Photograph of Rajinder Kaur

Rajinder Kaur (10 February 1931 – 5 February 1989) was an Indian journalist and politician from Punjab, India.

Kaur was daughter of Master Tara Singh. She studied at Khalsa College, Amritsar and Punjab University, Chandigarh, and Camp College, New Delhi for M.A. in philosophy, B.T. (Bachelor of Teaching) and Ph.D. in philosophy. She was lecturer at Khalsa College, Amritsar in 1958–59. Later she entered journalism and politics. She edited Punjabi daily Parbhat and the monthly Sant Sipahi from Amritsar. She was president of the Istri Akali Dal, women's wing of the Shiromani Akali Dal. In April 1978 Rajinder Kaur was elected to the Rajya Sabha. She was shot leaving a school in Bhatinda in February 1989. Her death sparked concern within Akali and Sikh communities. While government media attempted to blame Sikh activists, and vice versa, leaders such as Bhai Daljit Singh of the All India Sikh Student Federation condemned the killings and expressed sorrow.
