= Kanwarjit Singh Rozy Barkandi =

Indian politician

Kanwarjit Singh Cheema, popularly known by the name, Kanwarjit Singh Majhail, is an Indian politician who belongs to Aam Aadmi Party. He was a ticket candidate Member of the Legislative Assembly from Halka Tarn Taran in Sri Tarn Taran Sahib, Punjab in the year 2022.
