= Jagdeep Kamboj Goldy =

Cabinet Minister Punjab and Indian politician

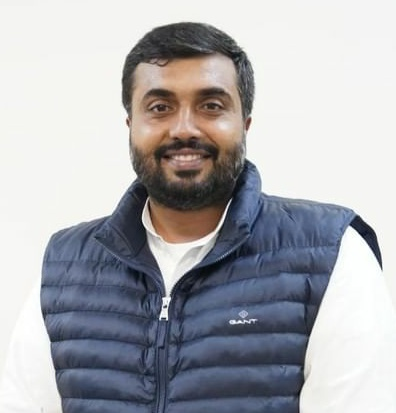

MLA, Punjab Legislative Assembly
- Incumbent
- Assumed office 2022
- Preceded by: Raminder Singh Awla
- Constituency: Jalalabad, Punjab
- Majority: Aam Aadmi Party

Personal details
- Party: Aam Aadmi Party
- Education: BA LLB
- Occupation: Advocate, Farmer and Politician

Jagdeep Kamboj Goldy is an Indian politician and the MLA representing the Jalalabad, Punjab Assembly constituency in the Punjab Legislative Assembly. He is a member of the Aam Aadmi Party. He was elected as the MLA in the 2022 Punjab Legislative Assembly election, defeating Sukhbir Singh Badal by 31000 Votes.

== Career ==
As of 2022 Goldy is the youth leader and leader of the Youth Wing of AAP Punjab. He is the AAP leader for Jalalabad district. In December 2021, he was appointed the AAP candidate for Jalalabad Assembly constituency.

== Member of Legislative Assembly ==
He was elected as the MLA in the 2022 Punjab Legislative Assembly election defeating the president of Shiromani Akali Dal, Sukhbir Singh Badal by a margin of 30,930 votes. The Aam Aadmi Party gained a strong 79% majority in the sixteenth Punjab Legislative Assembly by winning 92 out of 117 seats in the 2022 Punjab Legislative Assembly election. MP Bhagwant Mann was sworn in as Chief Minister on 16 March 2022.

Committee assignments of Punjab Legislative Assembly

- Chairman (2022–23) Committee on Papers laid/to be laid on the table and Library

== Electoral Performance for Punjab Assembly ==
By-election, 2019: Jalalabad, Punjab
Party	Candidate	Votes	%	±%
INC	Raminder Singh Awla	76,098		
SAD	Raj Singh Dibbipura	59,465		
AAP	Mohinder Singh	11,301		
IND	Jagdeep Kamboj Goldy	5,836		
NOTA	None of the above	704		
Majority				
Turnout		1,54,368	75.25	
INC gain from SAD		Swing		

Assembly Election 2022: Jalalabad, Punjab
Party	Candidate	Votes	%	±%
AAP	Jagdeep Kamboj Goldy	91,455	52.95	
SAD	Sukhbir Singh Badal	60,525	35.04	
INC	Mohan Singh Phalianwala	8,771	5.08	
BJP	Puran Chand	5,418	3.14	New
Independent	Surinder Singh	1,860	1.08	
SAD(A)	Gurmeet Singh	1,248	0.72	
NOTA	None of the above	830	0.48	
Majority		30,930	17.91	
Registered electors		213,416		
AAP gain from INC		Swing		

State Legislative Assembly
Preceded by Raminder Singh Awla	Member of the Punjab Legislative Assembly from Jalalabad, Punjab Assembly constituency 2022 –	Incumbent
