= Arun Narang =

Indian politician

Arun Narang is a Aam Aadmi Party politician from Punjab. From 2017–2022 he represented Abohar Assembly constituency in the Punjab Legislative Assembly as a member of the Bharatiya Janata Party. He lost his bid for re-election in the 2022 Punjab Legislative Assembly election.

== Member of Legislative Assembly ==
He was elected as Member of Legislative Assembly in 2017 Punjab Legislative Assembly election from Abohar Assembly constituency as candidate of Bharatiya Janata Party. His five year term of MLA ended in 2022 and he lost his re-election bid.

=== Farm laws ===
Narang supports BJP's 2020 Indian agriculture acts (commonly known as the farm laws). 2020–2021 Indian farmers' protest was launched to protest against the implementation of the new laws. In November 2020, he was gheraoed by the protesting farmers in Lambi Assembly segment in Muktsar district and forced to sit on the road.

=== Assault case in Malout ===
On March 27, 2021, Narang was visiting Malout town in Muktsar district of Punjab for a press conference to explain the benefits of the farm laws to the farmers. On his arrival to the BJP office, the protesting farmers angry with the farm laws threw black ink at him. Police official escorted Narang to a local shop, but upon returning from it, the protestors allegedly thrashed Narang, tore his clothes and stripped him naked. He was later escorted by the police to a safe place. Bharatiya Janata Party condemned the attack on MLA. Samyukta Kisan Morcha appealed to all protestors to remain peaceful. An FIR has been registered against 250–300 unknown protestors.

=== 2022 Assembly election ===
He contested in the 2022 Punjab Legislative Assembly election for re-election as BJP candidate. Narang won only 16.18% of the total number of votes polled and came on third position behind Sandeep Jakhar of Indian National Congress and Kuldeep Kumar alias Deep Kamboj of the Aam Aadmi Party.

== Political positions ==
Narang joined the Aam Aadmi Party in 2023.
