= Fazilka district =

- District of Punjab
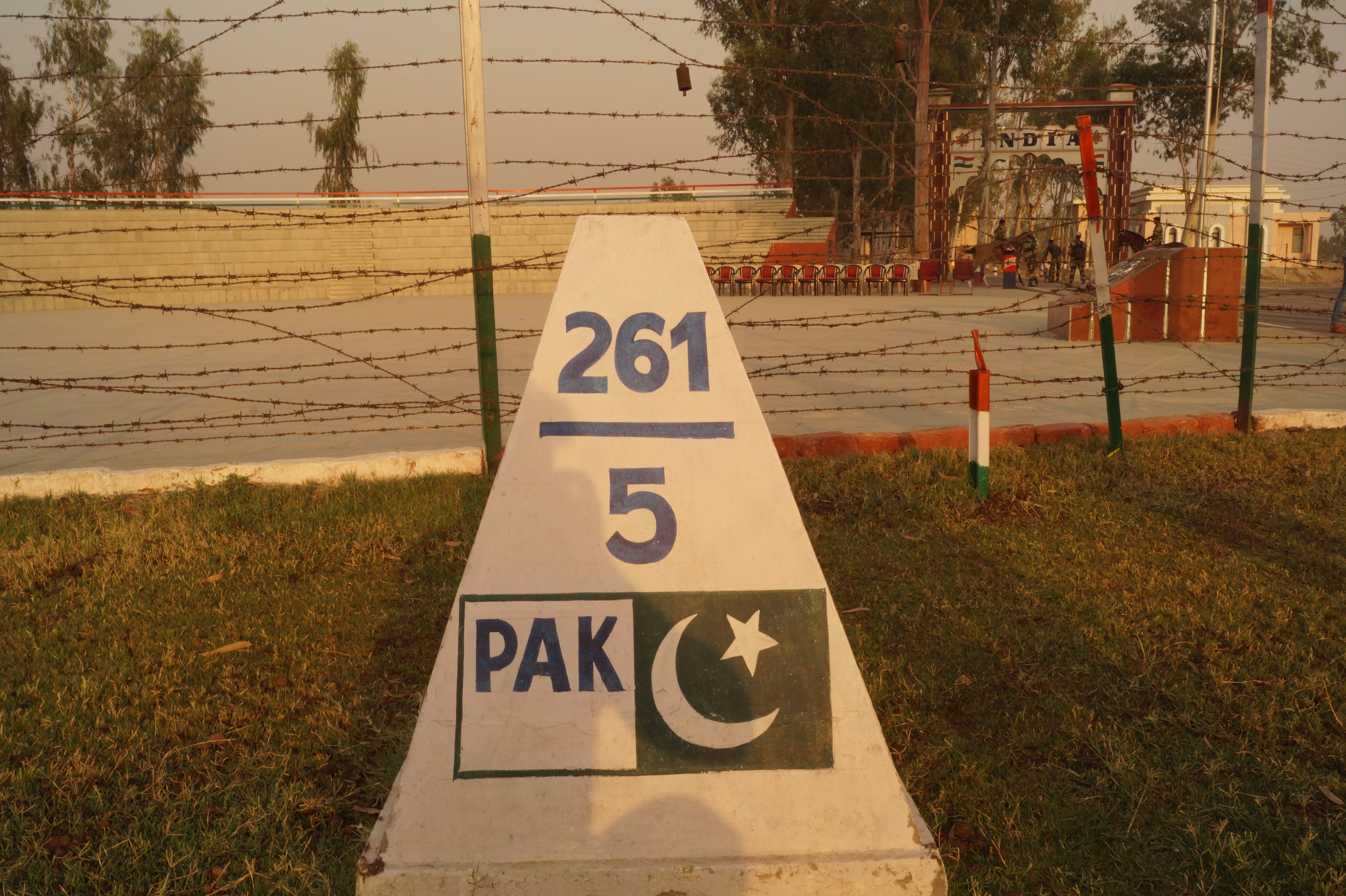
- Boundary marker at Sadqi Border Crossing with Pakistan

- Location in Punjab
- Coordinates: 30.403°N 74.025°E
- Country: India
- State: Punjab
- Established: 27 July 2011
- Named for: Mian Fazil Watoo
- Headquarters: Fazilka

Government
  - Deputy Commissioner: Senu Duggal, IAS
  - Senior Superintendent of Police: Avneet Kaur Sidhu, PPS

Area
  - Total: 3,113 km^{2} (1,202 sq mi)

Population (2011)
  - Total: 1,027,143
  - Density: 330.0/km^{2} (854.6/sq mi)

Languages
  - Official: Punjabi
  - Other: Hindi and Bagri
- Time zone: UTC+5:30 (IST)
- Website: http://fazilka.gov.in/

Fazilka district is one of 23 districts in the state of Punjab in India. The city of Fazilka serves as the district headquarters of Fazilka District. The district is part of the Firozpur division.

== History ==
On 27 July 2011, the Government of Punjab created two new districts: Fazilka district by the partition of Firozpur district, and Pathankot district by the partition of Gurdaspur district.

On 29 January 1970, Gandhi announced the transfer of a part of Fazilka tehsil and Abohar to Haryana. The final transfer of Fazilka and Abohar was to take place by January 1975. The transfer to a neighbouring State of Punjab's cotton-producing belt of Abohar and Fazilka was not accepted. On 25 January, the Mathew Commission said that Abohar and Fazilka tehsils of Punjab could not be transferred to Haryana because they were not contiguous with Haryana's border.

== Location ==
It is located next to the border with Pakistan, the border being to its west. It has the district of Firozpur to its north, Sri Muktsar Sahib to its east and Sri Ganganagar to the south and Pakistan to its west.

== Geography ==
It has an extreme climate, with the summers being very hot and the winters being very cold. The River Sutlej runs through the district and moves over to the Pakistan side through the Indo-Pakistani border.

== Politics ==
No.	Constituency	Name of MLA	Party	Bench
79	Jalalabad	Jagdeep Kamboj Goldy	Aam Aadmi Party	Government
80	Fazilka	Narinderpal Singh Sawna	Aam Aadmi Party	Government
81	Abohar	Sandeep Jakhar	Independent politician	Opposition
82	Balluana (SC)	Amandeep Singh 'Goldy' Musafir	Aam Aadmi Party	Government

== Administration ==
The district's chief executive is the Deputy Commissioner.

The district is administratively subdivided into three tehsils:

- Fazilka
- Abohar
- Jalalabad

=== Subdistricts of Fazilka district ===
According to the Indian government's integrated online directory, Fazilka district is divided into the following subdistricts (tehsils/subdivisions) and blocks:

- Subdistricts
  1. Abohar
  2. Fazilka
  3. Jalalabad
- Blocks:
  1. Abohar
  2. Arniwala Shiekh Subhan
  3. Fazilka
  4. Jalalabad
  5. Khuian Sarwar

== Demographics ==
According to the 2011 census, Fazilka district has a population of 1,027,143. Scheduled castes made up 41.51% of the population. The total sex ratio of the district was 894. The sex ratio of children below the age of 6 years was 853 for urban areas and 850 for rural areas in 2011.

=== Religion ===
Religion in Fazilka district (2011) (Note: This accounts for the division of Jalalabad tehsil by assuming the same proportion of religions in rural areas of residual Jalalabad tehsil. Urban area of remaining Jalalabad is Jalalabad town.)
Religion	Percent
Hinduism	59.17%
Sikhism	39.90%
Other or not stated	0.93%

Block	Hindu	Sikh	Other
Fazilka	216,854	183,196	4,202
Abohar	322,430	116,879	3,957
Jalalabad	129,228	224,463	2,336

Hinduism and Sikhism are the main religions of the Fazilka district. The Arora community of Punjabi Hindus constitute a sizeable population in the district. The migrating non-Muslim population from Pakistan to India in 1947 settled in this region of Firozpur district.

In the Firozpur Religion Census 2011, 84.97% of the Fazilka tehsil of Firozpur district registered their religion as Hindu and 13.35% registered as Sikh.

Towns in Fazilka District - Firozpur Religion Census 2011
Towns	Majority Religion	Population	Hindu	Sikh	Christian	Muslim	Buddhist	Jain	Other Religions	Not Stated
Fazilka	Hindu	76,492	84.97%	13.35%	0.89%	0.45%	0.01%	0.25%	0.00%	0.08%
Abohar	Hindu	145,302	83.27%	15.62%	0.42%	0.45%	0.06%	0.12%	0.01%	0.05%
Jalalabad	Hindu	39,525	68.56%	30.75%	0.15%	0.49%	0.02%	0.00%	0.01%	0.03%

=== Languages ===
Languages of Fazilka district (2011) (Note: Languages present in Fazilka, Abohar tehsils, Jalalabad town and the residual rural area of Jalalabad tehsil)
1. Punjabi (68.3%)
2. Bagri (21.6%)
3. Hindi (9.12%)
4. Others (1.02%)

At the time of the 2011 census, 68.31% of the population spoke Punjabi, 21.55% Bagri and 9.12% Hindi as their first language.

== Notable people ==
- Navdeep Asija, sustainable transport specialist
- Gurnam Bhullar, singer, from Kamal Wala village of the district
- Lawrence Bishnoi, gangster notable for assassinating Sidhu Moose Wala and killing many others
- Sher Singh Ghubaya, politician and former Member of Parliament
- Shubman Gill, cricketer
- Sunil Kumar Jakhar, Indian politician and president of the Bharatiya Janata Party, Punjab
- Surjit Kumar Jyani, politician
- Kunwar Mohinder Singh Bedi Sahar, Urdu poet (shifted to Fazilka after partition)
