= Fazilka =

Fazilka Fāzilkā (Punjabi) Bangla
- City
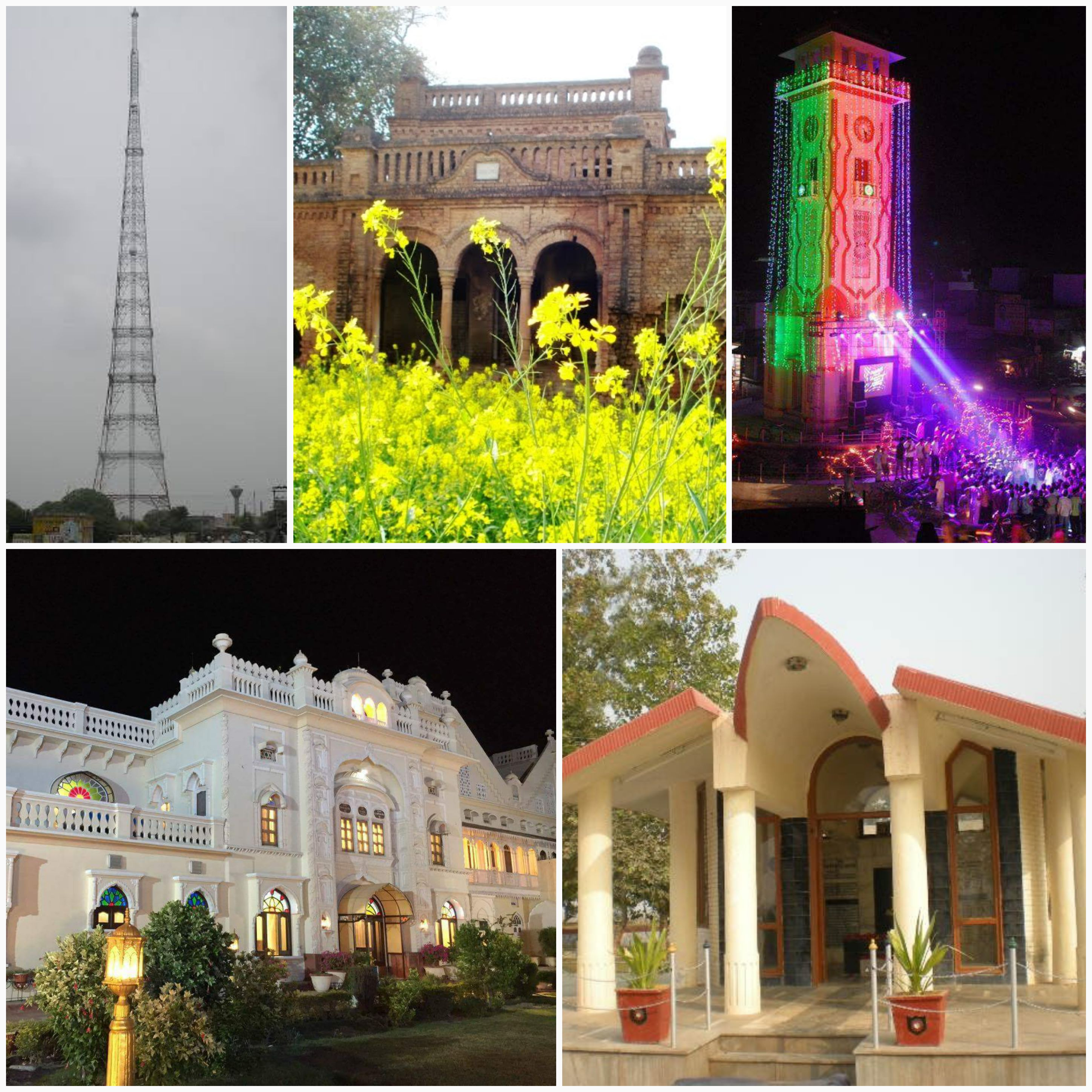
- From top clockwise: Fazilka TV Tower, Raghuwar Bhawan, Fazilka Clock Tower, Asafwala War Memorial and Khuranj Haveli Locations of Fazilka City, Punjab
- Nickname: FZK
- Location in Punjab, India Fazilka (India)
- Coordinates: 30.403°N 74.025°E
- Country: India
- State: Punjab
- District: Fazilka
- Established: 1844
- Founder: J.H Oliver
- Named for: Mian Fazil Watoo

Government
  - Type: Democratic
  - Member of Parliament: Sher Singh Ghubaya, Indian National Congress
  - Member of Legislative Assembly: Narinder Pal Singh Sawna, Aam Aadmi Party
- Elevation: 182 m (597 ft)

Population (2011)
  - Total: 76,492
- Demonym(s): Bangla, Fazilka

Languages
  - Official: Punjabi
  - Dialect: Malwai and Bagri
  - Other: Hindi, English
- Time zone: UTC+5:30 (IST)
- PIN: 152123
- Telephone code: 01638
- Vehicle registration: PB-22
- Sex ratio: 897/1000
- Literacy: 79.53%
- Lok Sabha constituency: Firozpur
- Vidhan Sabha constituency: Fazilka
- Planning agency: PUDA
- Major Highways: NH7 SH20 SH40
- Precipitation: 923.9 millimetres (36.37 in)
- Website: fazilka.gov.in

Population history of Fazilka, Punjab, India

Fazilka, also known as Bangla, is a city and a municipal council in Fazilka district of Punjab, India. In 2011, it was made the headquarter of the newly created Fazilka district. The Turkmenistan-Afghanistan-Pakistan-India (TAPI) pipeline project originating in Turkmenistan will have its last station in Fazilka.

== Background ==
=== Etymology ===
Fazilka, founded in 1844 CE, is named by its founder J.H. Oliver after the Mian Fazil Watoo who had earlier owned the land before it was ceded to the British by the Bahawalpur princely state. Prior to its establishment as a district headquarter by Oliver, and as a shopping centre by him, it was an uncultivated bushy area. Oliver turned the town into a trading hub between Punjab and Sindh and it was a wool trading hub till the partition of India.

Oliver had also eponymously named nearby town Ellenabad, now in Sirsa district of Haryana, after his daughter who was also called Ellena.

=== History ===
The municipality of Fazilka was formed with Punjab Government Notification No. 486, on 10 December 1885. The town was added to the Ferozepur district in 1884. On 25 July 2011, Fazilka was declared a District by the Government of Punjab with Gazette Notification No. 1/1/2011-RE-II(I)/14554.

Before partition, 50% of Fazilka's population was Muslim. All of them left India for Pakistan in 1947. Most of the villages around Fazilka were dominated by Bukhari Syeds (including the village of Baik Sharif), Jaat of kerian, Muslim families, mainly the Bodla, Watto, Sahoo Rajpoot, Kalya Rajpoot and Chisti clans.

Many people from Fazilka pay an annual visit to Katas Raj Temples — a Hindu holy site in Pakistan, the site of an ancient Shiva Temple — usually in August.

== Geography ==
=== Location and distance ===
Fazilka is a border town 10 km (6.2 mi) east of India-Pakistan border, it is also located near the tri-junction of 3 states within India, namely Punjab-Haryana-Rajasthan.on the India. Within India, it is 100 km (62 mi) west of Bathinda, 210 km southwest of holy city Amritsar, 210 km southwest of industrial city Ludhiana, 210 km southwest of state capital Chandigarh, 240 km northwest of NCR CM city Hisar, 400 km northwest of national capital Delhi.

=== International border crossing ===
India's Sadiqui Check Post on the India-Pakistan border is manned by the Border Security Force (BSF). The Sadiqui Integrated Check Post (Sadiqui ICP) is a crossing and check post 14 km east of the India-Pakistan border jointly managed by India and Pakistan border forces. Across the Indian village is Sulemanki Headworks on the Satluj River, inside Pakistan just 2 km east of Sadiqui ICP. This crossing is also called the Sadiqui-Sulemanki border crossing.

After the Indo-Pakistani War of 1971, the crossing was closed. As of 2017, it was closed, and people of the area have been demanding the opening of the Sadiqui-Sulemanki border crossing for trade to bring prosperity.

According to the agreement, no construction is allowed by either country, including bunkers, etc. within 150 meters of the border.

=== Sadiqui-Sulemanki border ceremony ===
At the Sadiqui-Sulemanki border crossing, a 40-minute beating retreat flag ceremony is held every day at 6 pm since 1970. It is jointly held by the military of both nations, Border Security Force (BSF) of India and Pakistan Rangers. It is open for the public and tourists as a tourist attraction. It is similar to the other border ceremonies at Atari-Wagah and Hussainiwala-Ganda Singh Wala in Punjab and Munabao-Khokhrapar in Rajasthan. According to the Indian officials, "At Sadiqi, the BSF personnel and Pakistani Rangers march and lower the national flags in their respective territories, while at Wagah and Hussainiwala, their counterparts cross the Radcliffe Line, shake hands and lower the flags."

On India's Independence Day on 15 August, nearly 45,000 people from India arrive to witness the border ceremony. Fazilka, like many towns on the India-Pakistani border, has suffered difficulties dating back to the Partition of India in 1947. The Radcliffe Line, the border recommended by departing British colonial authorities, divides natural resources, and people. During the ceremony, kin of families separated during partition of India arrive to waive at each other to show affection. Till 2012, the authorities on both sides of the border used to allow the family members to meet, hug and shake hand with each other but the practice was later on discontinued apparently due to security reasons.

=== Asafwala war memorial ===
The Asafwala War Memorial, also called Asafwala Shaheedon Ki Samadhi, a war memorial and samadhi (shrine) spread over 5 acres Asafwala War Memorial 10 km northeast of Sadiqui-Sulemanki border ceremony and 4 km southwest of Fazilka on Fazilka-Sadiqui Road, is dedicated to martyrs of Indian Army of Indo-Pakistani War of 1971 who sacrificed their lives and saved Fazilka town from falling in the hands of Pakistan Army. Memorial, built in 1972, is dedicated to soldiers who fought here who mainly belonged to the 67 Infantry Brigade's battalions consisting of 4 Jat Regiment, 15 Rajput Regiment and 3 Assam Rifles. This is a unique war memorial which also has the relics of the war heroes who repulsed the Pakistani attack, saved Fazilka, but sacrificed their lives. Apart from the martyrs relics, the memorial also has photos of all the martyrs, and busts of 4 decorated war heroes as follows:

- Maha Vir Chakra (India's 2nd highest gallantry award):
  - Lance Naik Drigpal Singh of 15 Rajput Regiment
- Vir Chakra (India's 3rd highest gallantry award) :
  - Major Narain Singh company commander of 4 Jat Regiment
  - Major Lalit Mohan Bhatia of 15 Rajput Regiment
  - Lance Havildar Gangadhar of 4 Jat Regiment (Vir Chakra).

On 3 December 1971, Pakistan Army attacked India through Sulemanki Headworks 14 km from fazilka and had invaded 7 km inside India via Indian villages of Beriwala, Gurmi Khera and Pakka till Asafwala which is 7 km from Fazila. At Asafwala, Pakistani encountered resistance from the Indian contingent of 226 soldiers who held up the Pakistani advances. Skirmished followed cross various villages, Indian repulsed the Pakistanis who had attacked with high tech guns and tanks, and snatched back all areas taken by Pakistanis except Beriwala village on the border when war suddenly ended with Pakistan's surrender. After the war ended within 13 days, resulting in India's victory, surrender of 92000 Pakistani troops and liberation of Bangladesh from Pakistan, Indian villagers found dead bodies of 82 Indian soldiers who died fighting Pakistani forces and prevented Fazilka from falling into Pakistani hands. They were mass cremated by villagers in a 90 feet long pyre on 17 December 1971 and their relics were enshrined in the memorial as a samadhi (revered shrine). Villagers built a samadhi as a memorial, which is now jointly managed by committee of villagers and the Indian Army, which also runs a computer centre at memorial to impart the vocation training to the villagers.

== Culture ==
=== Demography ===
As of the 2011 Indian census, Fazilka had a population of 76,492. Males constitute about 52% of the population and females 48%. Fazilka has an average literacy rate of 70.7%: male literacy is 74.6%, and female literacy is 66.4%. 11% of the population is under 6 years of age.

As of 2024, Fazilka District has population of 1,060,534 (based on 2011 census).

=== Languages ===
Punjabi is the language of Fazilka. Punjabi is spoken by a most people followed by Bagri.

=== Regional dance ===
Fazilka is known for a style of jhumar dance promulgated by Baba Pokhar Singh (1916–2002). Pokhar Singh's family had migrated from the Montgomery District of Western Punjab, and they claimed to represent the Ravi style of jhumar. However, Fazilka had its own style of jhumar which was referred to as the Satluj style. Therefore, at least two regional styles were mixed in everyday life, and in his jhummar routine (which was basically the same each time, and which family and friends still perform today), Pokhar identified several other regional movements.

== Climate ==
The climate of the Fazilka District is, on the whole, dry and is characterized by a very hot summer, a short rainy season, and a bracing winter. The year may be divided into four seasons. The cold season is from November to March. This is followed by the summer season which lasts until about the end of July. The period from August to mid-September constitutes the south-westerly monsoon season. The latter half of September and October may be termed the post-monsoon or the transition period.

== Transport ==
=== Railway ===
The first railway line through the town was set up in 1898 on the occasion of the Diamond Jubilee of the ascension to the throne by Queen Victoria. Fazilka was connected by railway to McLeod Ganj (now in PakMandi Sadiqganj) on the route to Bahawalnagar and then to Bahawalpur. Fazilka was connected by railway to Amruka (now in Pakistan) through Chaanwala. The tracks from Fazilka to McLeod Ganj and from Fazilka to Chaanwala are now closed, perhaps removed.

Fazilka Junction railway station is connected to Abohar, Ferozepur, and Bathinda junctions Northern Railways. A new 43 km long railway line to Abohar towards the south has been constructed to shorten the distance to Bikaner by over 100 km. Trains on the new railway line to Abohar began running in July 2012. An express train started between Sri Ganganagar and Firozpur via Abohar and Fazilka in November 2012 on this track.

=== Roads ===
National Highway 7 passes through Fazilka. NH 7 connects to NH 9 at Malaut which leads to Delhi via Mandi Dabwali, Hissar and Rohtak. The state highway runs from Fazilka to Ferozepur and from Fazilka to Malout. Both are good roads.

It is 100 km from Bhatinda where it connects to Amritsar–Jamnagar Expressway, Pathankot–Ajmer Expressway, NH-9 to Hisar and Delhi.

=== Air ===
Amritsar international airport and Bathinda domestic airport are the nearest, about 90 km away.

=== Intra-city-Ecocabs ===
Fazilka have a public bus transport system. Cycle rickshaws are the available means of transport in the city. These rickshaws are now dispatched by Fazilka Centre.

== Notable people ==
- Navdeep Asija, road safety and sustainable transport specialist
- Sher Singh Ghubaya, member of the Lok Sabha
- Shubman Gill, Indian cricketer
- Surjit Kumar Jyani, politician and a former Punjab health minister
- Kunwar Mohinder Singh Bedi Sahar, Urdu poet with pen-name 'Sahar'
