= Abohar =

Abohar Abuhar
- City
- Location in Punjab, India Abohar (India)
- Coordinates: 30.1334°N 74.2001°E
- Country: India
- State: Punjab
- District: Fazilka

Government
  - Type: Municipal Corporation
  - Body: Abohar Municipal Corporation

Area
  - Total: 188.24 km^{2} (72.68 sq mi)
- Elevation: 180 m (590 ft)

Population (2011)
  - Total: 145,302
  - Density: 771.90/km^{2} (1,999.2/sq mi)
- Demonym: Aboharias

Languages
  - Official: Punjabi
  - Others: Bagri, Hindi
- Time zone: UTC+5:30 (IST)
- PIN: 152116
- STD code: 01634
- Vehicle registration: PB-15

Abohar is a city and municipal corporation in the Fazilka district of Punjab, situated southeast of Fazilka. It lies near the India–Pakistan border. According to the 2011 Census of India, Abohar's population was 145,302. The city and its suburbs are known for kinnow production, with the Abohar belt alone contributing up to 60% of Punjab's total kinnow output. Lahore, Pakistan, lies to the west-northwest of Abohar, at a straight-line distance of approximately 156–157 km (98 miles).

== History ==
In Book II of the Ain-i-Akbari, Abohar (Persian: ابوهر, transliterated as Abuhar) appears as a pargana under the Sarkar of Sirhind, within the Subah of Delhi. The Sarkar of Sirhind was an important administrative and military division of the Delhi Subah, functioning as a strategic gateway to the empire's northwestern frontiers. Abohar's classification as a pargana reflects its established role as a fiscal jurisdiction, with defined territorial limits, inhabited settlements, and assessed land (zamin) revenues.

=== Connections with Firoz Shah Tughluq ===
This city developed a deeper connection with Tughluqs. Firoz Shah Tughluq's mother Bibi Naila was from Abohar and Tughlaq's court historian Shams-i Siraj 'Afif lived here.

=== British Colonial Era ===
During the British era in India, it was the hub of horse breeding and a major cotton trade centre having business with Karachi and other mandis.

== Geography ==
=== Location ===
Abohar, located approximately 32 kilometres (19.8 miles) south of Fazilka, is the nearest border town to Fazilka. It serves as a connection point between the two Indian states of Punjab and Rajasthan. Within India, Abohar is situated 75.6 kilometres (47 miles) west of Bathinda, 258 kilometres southwest of the Sikh holy city of Amritsar, 217 kilometres southwest of the industrial city of Ludhiana, 300 kilometres southwest of the state capital Chandigarh, and 373 kilometres northwest of the national capital, New Delhi.

=== Flora and Fauna ===
Abohar is home to the Abohar Wildlife Sanctuary, which provides a free-range sanctuary for black bucks. The open sanctuary is spread over 18,650 hectares across farmlands and villages. The sanctuary is also home to Albizia lebbeck, Acacia nilotica, Azadirachta indica, A. tortilis, Nilgai, porcupines, hares, and jackals.

== Governance and politics ==
=== Civic administration ===
The Abohar Municipal Council was constituted under and administered by the Punjab Municipal Act of 1911. The first election of the Corporation was held in 2021. The municipal revenue receipt for the financial year 2025-26 was ₹435020000 and the revenue expenditure was ₹381893000. It is subdivided into 50 wards. Of the 50 wards, 17 are general wards, while 19 are reserved for women and an additional seven wards are reserved for Scheduled Caste women. A total of six seats are reserved for the Scheduled Castes while one is reserved for the Backward Classes. The Commissioner is Amarpreet Kaur Sandhu, IAS. The Mayor is Pooja Wadhwa (BJP), the Senior Deputy Mayor is Dharmveer Malkat (BJP) and the Deputy Mayor is Deepak Chhapola (BJP). National programmes such as Swachh Survekshan, AMRUT, PM Awas Yojana - Urban have been implemented in Abohar and ICAR-NBPGR New Delhi organised a one-day training on PRG Awareness.

== Demographics ==
=== Population ===
According to the 2011 Indian census, Abohar had a population of 145,302, of which 76,984 were males and 68,318 were females.

=== Religion ===
Religion in Abohar City (2011 census)
Religion	Percent
Hinduism	83.27%
Sikhism	15.60%
Others	1.13%

The majority of the people living in Abohar follows Hinduism, with a significant Sikh minority.

=== Languages ===
Language in Abohar (2011 census)
Language	Percent
Punjabi	42.66%
Hindi	36.67%
Bagri	5.20%
Others	15.47%

Punjabi is the official language of the city and is spoken by the majority. Other major languages spoken are Bagri and Hindi.

== Economy ==
Abohar's economy is based mostly on agriculture, which has given it the moniker "California of Punjab" thanks to its rich soil and robust canal irrigation. It is one of the biggest cotton-producing belts in North India and a significant producer of wheat and rice. Its kinnow orchards, which cover more than 32,000 hectares, or more than 70% of Punjab's total kinnow area, make it a national horticultural powerhouse that exports citrus to Russia, Ukraine, and the Middle East. In addition to rice shellers, agro-processing facilities, brick kilns, and companies like Luxmi Textile Industries and Behari Lal Cotton Industry that handle ginning, cotton waste, and cottonseed oil, cotton processing serves as the backbone of local industry. Historically, Abohar was a major pre-Partition wool market, exporting via Karachi to Britain. It retains heritage cottage industries and hosts Anand Energy, India's first biogas bottling plant, reflecting some diversification beyond its dominant agrarian and cotton-trade foundation. Some other industries in Abohar are R.K Feed Industries, SMB Plastic Industry, B.M. Agro Industries Pvt. Ltd, Pine Emulsifier Manufacturer.
