= Chaudhary Ram Lubaya =

Indian politician (1941–2017)

MLA, Punjab
- In office 2002–2007
- Preceded by: Mohinder Kaur Josh
- Succeeded by: Mohinder Kaur Josh
- Constituency: Sham Chaurasi

Personal details
- Born: 1941 Piplanwala, Hoshiarpur, Punjab, British India
- Died: 2017 (aged 75–76) Hoshiarpur, Punjab, India
- Party: Indian National Congress
- Spouse: Santosh Chowdhary
- Children: 4
- Parent: Chaudhary Sunder Singh

Chaudhary Ram Lubhaya (1941–2017) was an Indian National Congress leader from Punjab who served as a Member of the Legislative Assembly.

== Personal life ==
Chaudhary Ram Lubhaya was born into a Ravidassia family in 1941 in Village Piplanwala, Hoshiarpur district of Punjab, into a politically active family. His father, Chaudhary Sunder Singh, was an invincible leader who won all elections from 1946 onwards until 1989. He pursued his higher education at Panjab University, where he graduated before entering public life.

He was married to former Union Minister of state and M.P, Santosh Chowdhary.

== Career ==
In 2002, he became MLA from Sham Chaurasi constituency defeating Mohinder Kaur Josh.

Lubhaya died in 2017 due to heart attack in the All India Institute Of Medical Science, Delhi.
