= Amritsar Central Assembly constituency =

Legislative Assembly constituency in Punjab State, India

Coordinates: 31.63°N 74.87°E

Amritsar Central
- Constituency No. 17 for the Punjab Legislative Assembly

Constituency details
- Country: India
- State: Punjab
- District: Amritsar
- Lok Sabha constituency: Amritsar
- Total electors: 147,058 (in 2022)
- Reservation: None

Member of Legislative Assembly
- 16th Punjab Legislative Assembly
- Incumbent Ajay Gupta
- Party: Aam Aadmi Party
- Elected year: 2022

Amritsar Central Assembly constituency (Sl. No.: 17) is a Punjab Legislative Assembly constituency in Amritsar district, Punjab state, India.

== Members of Legislative Assembly ==
Most successful parties from Amritsar Central Vidhan Sabha
1. INC (8 Times) (50.0%)
2. BJP (3 Times) (18.8%)
3. BJS (2 Times) (12.5%)
4. AAP (1 Time) (6.25%)
5. JP (1 Time) (6.25%)
6. INC (I) (1 Time) (6.25%)

Year	Member	Party
1952	Amir Chand Gupta	Indian National Congress
Amritsar City Civil Lines constituency
1957	Sarup Singh	Indian National Congress
1962	Jai Inder Singh	Indian National Congress
Amritsar Central constituency
1967	Balram Das Tandon	Bharatiya Jana Sangh
1969	Balram Das Tandon	Bharatiya Jana Sangh
1972	Partap Chand	Indian National Congress
1977	Balram Das Tandon	Janata Party
1980	Darbari Lal	Indian National Congress (Indira)
1985	Darbari Lal	Indian National Congress
1992	Laxmi Kanta Chawla	Bharatiya Janata Party
1997	Laxmi Kanta Chawla	Bharatiya Janata Party
2002	Darbari Lal	Indian National Congress
2007	Laxmi Kanta Chawla	Bharatiya Janata Party
2012	Om Parkash Soni	Indian National Congress
2017	Om Parkash Soni	Indian National Congress
2022	Ajay Gupta	Aam Aadmi Party

== Election results ==
=== 2027 ===
Punjab Assembly election, 2027: Amritsar Central
Party	Candidate	Votes	%	±%
AAP				
AD (WPD)				New entry
INC				
BSP				
SAD				New entry
BJP				
NOTA	None of the above			
Majority				
Turnout				

=== 2022 ===
Punjab Assembly election, 2022: Amritsar Central
Party	Candidate	Votes	%	±%
AAP	Ajay Gupta	40,837	46.83	
INC	Om Parkash Soni	26,811	30.74	
BJP	Ram Chawla	13,551	15.54	
BSP	Dalvir Kaur	4,016	4.61	
NOTA	None of the above	697	0.76	
Majority		14,026	16.09	
Turnout		87,205		
Registered electors		147,058		
AAP gain from INC		Swing		

=== 2017 ===
Punjab Assembly election, 2017: Amritsar Central
Party	Candidate	Votes	%	±%
INC	Om Parkash Soni	51,242	53.86	
BJP	Tarun Chugh	34,560	36.32	
AAP	Ajay Gupta	7171	7.54	
BSP	rajesh kumar	500	0.53	
NOTA	None of the above	919	0.97	
Majority		21,116	23.50	
Turnout		89,789	66.70	
Registered electors		135,954		
INC gain from BJP		Swing		

=== 2012 ===
Punjab Assembly election, 2012: Amritsar Central
Party	Candidate	Votes	%	±%
INC	Om Parkash Soni	47,357	55.32	
BJP	Tarun Chugh	30126	40.37	
CPI(M)	Vijay Kumar Misra	1212	1.42	
BSP	Jagdish Raj	808	0.94	
Independent	Rakesh Kumar	737	0.86	
Independent	Baldev Bhardwaj	304	0.36	
Independent	Narinder Shekhar Luthra	180	0.21	
Independent	Om Prakash	166	0.19	
