= Rajinder Kaur Bhattal =

Indian politician

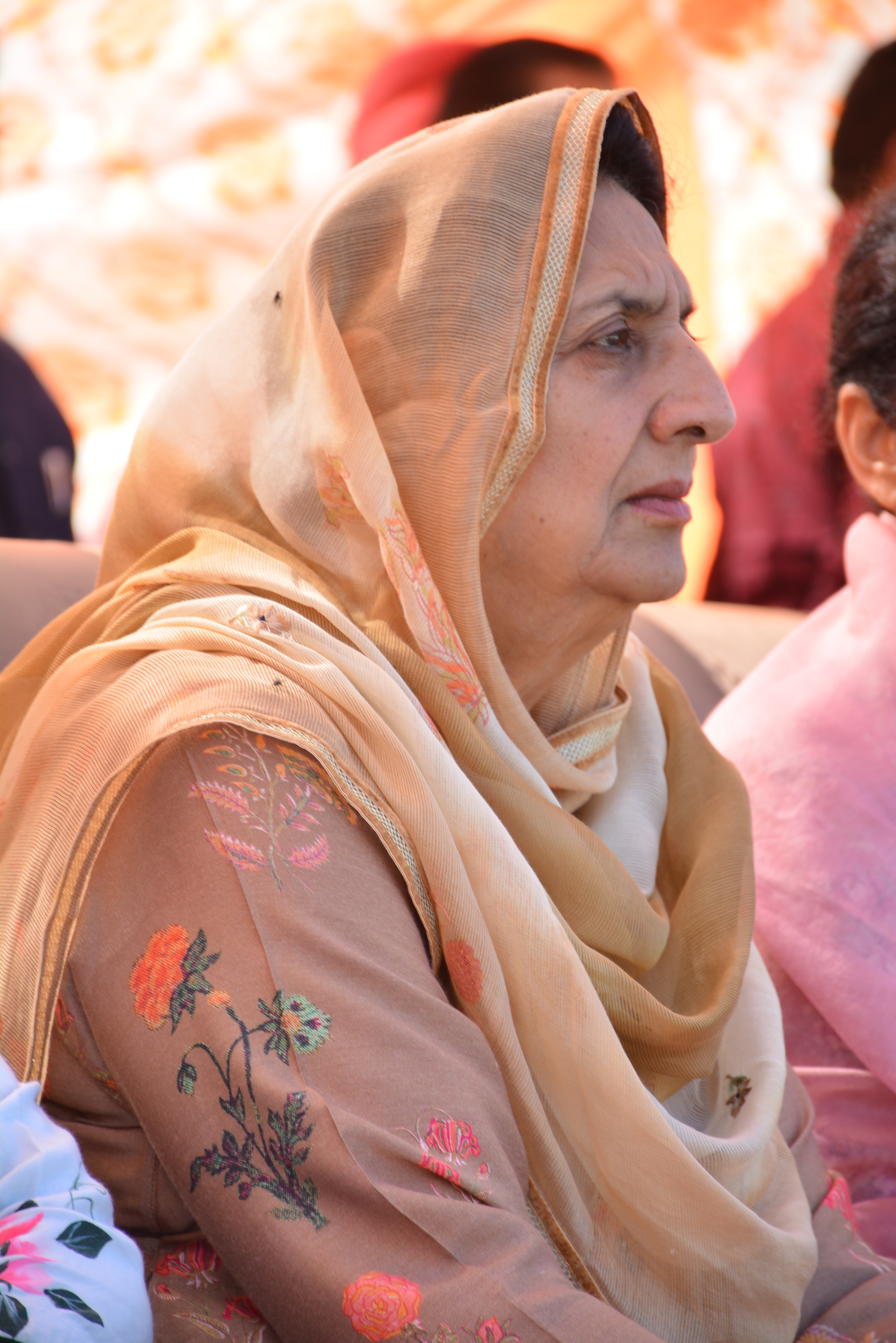

14th Chief Minister of Punjab
- In office 21 November 1996 – 11 February 1997
- Governor: B. K. N. Chhibber
- Cabinet: Rajinder Kaur Bhattal ministry
- Deputy: vacant
- Preceded by: Harcharan Singh Brar
- Succeeded by: Parkash Singh Badal
Additional Ministries
In office 21 November 1996 – 11 February 1997
Ministry and Departments	General Administration; Personnel; Home Affairs & Justice; Vigilance; Unallocated Departments
Preceded by	Harcharan Singh Brar
Succeeded by	Parkash Singh Badal

2nd Deputy Chief Minister of Punjab
- In office 6 January 2004 – 1 March 2007
- Governor: Jaswant Singh
- Chief Minister: Amarinder Singh
- Preceded by: herself(1996)
- Succeeded by: Sukhbir Singh Badal
- In office 6 August 1996 – 21 November 1996
- Governor: B. K. N. Chhibber
- Chief Minister: Harcharan Singh Brar
- Preceded by: Balram Das Tandon
- Succeeded by: herself(2004)

11th & 13th Leader of the Opposition in the Punjab Legislative Assembly
- In office 1 March 2007 – 14 March 2012
- Governor: Sunith Francis Rodrigues
- Chief Minister: Prakash Singh Badal
- Deputy Chief Minister: Sukhbir Singh Badal
- Preceded by: Parkash Singh Badal
- Succeeded by: Sunil Kumar Jakhar
- In office 12 February 1997 – 10 October 1998
- Governor: B. K. N. Chhibber
- Chief Minister: Parkash Singh Badal
- Deputy Chief Minister: vacant
- Preceded by: Satnam Singh Kainth
- Succeeded by: Chaudhary Jagjit Singh

Member of the Punjab Legislative Assembly
- In office 1992–2012
- Preceded by: President's rule
- Succeeded by: Parminder Singh Dhindsa
- Constituency: Lehra

Personal details
- Born: 30 September 1945 (age 81) Lahore, Punjab, British Raj
- Party: Indian National Congress

Rajinder Kaur Bhattal (born 30 September 1945) is an Indian politician and member of Congress who served as the 14th Chief Minister of Punjab from 1996 to 1997. She is also served as 2nd Deputy Chief Minister of Punjab from 2004 to 2007. She is the first and so far only female to hold the office of Chief Minister in Punjab. Overall she is 8th female Chief Minister and first female deputy chief minister in India. Since 1992 she has won from Lehra Assembly Constituency five terms consecutively.

== Early life ==
She was born toward the end of the British Raj on 30 September 1945 in Lahore in Punjab to Hira Singh Bhattal and Harnam Kaur. She was married to Lal Singh Sidhu at village Changali Wala, Lehragaga in Sangrur district and had two children, a girl and a boy.

== Political career ==
In 1994, Bhattal was a state education minister in Chandigarh. Bhattal became the first female Chief Minister of Punjab when she took office after the resignation of Harcharan Singh Brar, serving from November 1996 to February 1997, the eighth female Chief Minister in Indian history. Before she became the chief minister, she also served as deputy chief minister for a short period of time under Harcharan Singh Brar's cabinet. Her initiatives as Chief Minister of Punjab included, in December 1996, a scheme to provide grants of free electricity to small farmers in order to power wells.

After the Congress party lost the February 1997 assembly elections in Punjab, bringing an end to her term as Chief Minister, Bhattal took over as president of the Punjab Pradesh Congress Committee from Singh Randhawa in May, and then as leader of the Congress Legislature Party until October 1998, when she was ousted from her position and replaced by Chaudhary Jagjit Singh. Her ousting, amid claims of misleading statements about the involvement of the Congress leadership, was followed by a protracted dispute with Amarinder Singh, who had succeeded her as Punjab Congress president, and who was seen as responsible for her removal. By 2003, Bhattal had publicly pledged to remove Singh from his position as Chief Minister and was backed by dozens of dissident MLAs from the Congress party. The dispute saw intervention from the central command of the Congress party in New Delhi, with Sonia Gandhi taking a hand in negotiations. Initially the dissident group led by Bhattal rejected any solution other than the removal of Singh.

In January 2004, Bhattal accepted a position as deputy chief minister of Punjab, with other dissidents also taking roles in the cabinet, in a bid to heal the divisions. Denying that the dissidents had made demands in order to gain these concessions, Bhattal said that she had accepted the post because Sonia Gandhi had asked her to do so. In March 2007, Bhattal became leader of the Congress Legislature Party in Punjab Vidhan Sabha. The dispute rumbled on, however, and in April 2008 the party high command once again had to intervene, this time asking both Singh and Bhattal to cease speaking to the media about their disagreements.

During this period, Bhattal also saw off attempted prosecutions, with a court acquitting her of corruption charges in April 2008. Continuing as Punjab Congress leader, she also took credit for successfully pressuring the administration of Parkash Singh Badal to introduce a debt waiver scheme for farmers.

As of June 2011, Bhattal remains the Punjab Congress Legislature Party leader.

She was one of the 42 INC MLAs who submitted their resignation in protest of a decision of the Supreme Court of India ruling Punjab's termination of the Sutlej-Yamuna Link water canal unconstitutional.
