= Hussan Lal =

Indian Civil Servant

Hussan Lal is a senior retired bureaucrat of the Indian Administrative Service (IAS) from the 1995 Punjab cadre. Over the course of his career, he has held several important positions in both the Government of Punjab and the Government of India.

== Biography ==
He was born on 1 August 1964 in Raipur Nangal village, Nawanshahr, Punjab. Former Chief Minister of Punjab Charanjit Singh Channi announced him as the candidate of the Punjab Legislative Assembly from the Banga reserved seat, but Lal refused to contest the elections.

== Career ==
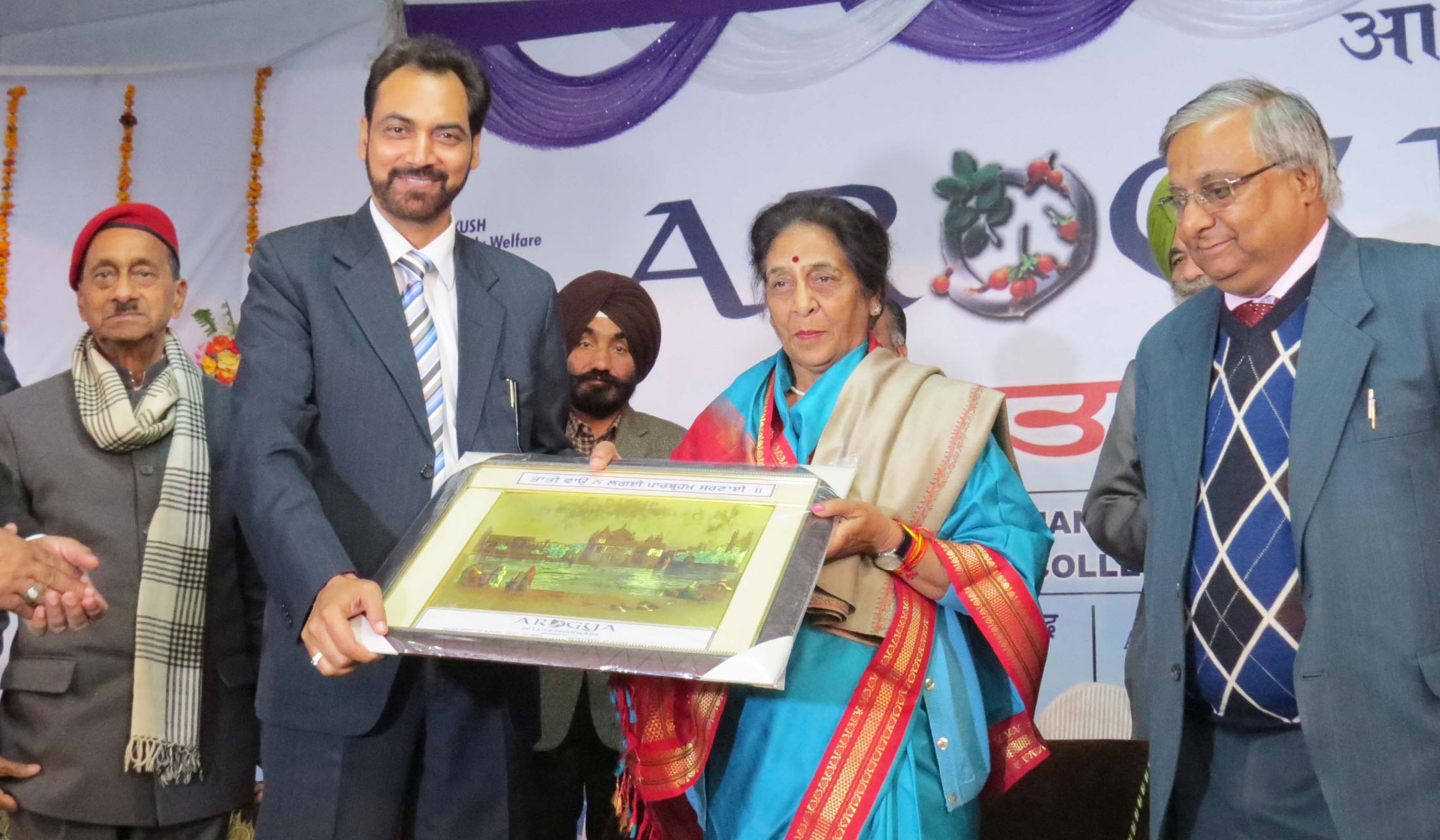
Santosh Chowdhary being honoured by the Secretary, Health, Govt. of Punjab, Shri Hussan Lal, at the AROGYA Health Fair, at Phagwara of Distt. Kapurthala in Punjab. The Secretary, Department of AYUSH

Over his career, he has served in a wide range of key positions in both the Government of Punjab and the Government of India. In Punjab, he held crucial roles such as Principal Secretary, Health and Family Welfare, where he was widely recognized for managing the state's response during the COVID-19 pandemic, strengthening healthcare systems, and overseeing vaccination drives. He also served as Principal Secretary, Tourism and Cultural Affairs, contributing to the promotion of Punjab's heritage and tourism potential, and held responsibilities in the Education, Transport, and Finance departments at various stages of his service. At the central level, Hussan Lal was Joint Secretary in the Ministry of Youth Affairs & Sports, playing a vital role in policy planning and youth development initiatives. In 2021, he was appointed Principal Resident Commissioner of Punjab in New Delhi, where he represented the state's interests with the Union government and national institutions. Known for his people-centric approach, administrative efficiency, and dedication to public welfare, Hussan Lal has earned respect as one of Punjab's prominent bureaucrats.

When Charanjit Singh Channi became Chief Minister of Punjab in September 2021, Hussan Lal was serving as Principal Secretary, Health and Family Welfare in his administration. In this role, Hussan Lal worked closely with CM Channi to strengthen the state's health sector, which was still recovering from the impact of the COVID-19 pandemic. Later he appointed as Principal Secretary to Chief Minister of Punjab.
