= List of deputy chief ministers of Punjab, India =

Punjab dy. Head of government

Deputy Chief Minister of Punjab
- Emblem of Punjab
- Incumbent; Vacant since 16 March 2022
- Abbreviation: DCM
- Member of: Cabinet
- Nominator: Chief Minister of Punjab
- Appointer: Governor of Punjab
- Inaugural holder: Balram Das Tandon
- Formation: 17 February 1969; 57 years ago

The deputy chief minister of Punjab is a member of the Cabinet in the Government of Punjab. It's not a constitutional office, it seldom carries any specific powers. In the parliamentary system of government, the chief minister is treated as the "first among equals" in the cabinet; the position of deputy chief minister is used to bring political stability and strength within a coalition government or in a party. The position of deputy chief minister is not explicitly defined or mentioned in the Constitution of India. However, the Supreme Court of India has stated that the appointment of deputy chief ministers is not unconstitutional. The court has clarified that a deputy chief minister, for all practical purposes, remains a minister in the council of ministers headed by the chief minister and does not draw a higher salary or perks compared to other ministers.During the absence of the chief minister, the deputy-chief minister may chair cabinet meetings and lead the assembly majority. Various deputy chief ministers have also taken the oath of secrecy in line with the one that chief minister takes. This oath has also sparked controversies.

== History ==
=== PEPSU ===
In history of PEPSU state there was only one deputy chief minister Brish Bhan.

=== Punjab ===
Till now five people served as Deputy CM of Punjab. Balram Das Tandon was the first who hold the position when Bhartiya Jana Sangh formed coalition government with Akali Dal – Sant Fateh Singh under the chief ministership of Gurnam Singh. Then in 1996 and 2004, Rajinder Kaur Bhattal became the Deputy CM under chief ministership of Harcharan Singh Brar and Amarinder Singh respectively and the only deputy chief minister who also served as chief minister. Sukhbir Singh Badal is the only one who served the position for thrice under chief ministership of his father Parkash Singh Badal. In 2021 for the first time two persons, Sukhjinder Singh Randhawa and Om Parkash Soni appointed deputy cm under Charanjit Singh Channi.

== List of deputy chief ministers ==
=== PEPSU ===
INC (1)
Sr. No.	Name (constituency) (birth-death)	Portrait	Term of office			Political party	Chief Minister	Appointed by
1	Brish Bhan (Kalayat) (1908-1988)		23 May 1951	21; April 1952	1 year, 275 days	Indian National Congress	Raghbir Singh	Yadavindra Singh
1	Brish Bhan (Kalayat) (1908-1988)		8 March 1954	12 January 1955	1 year, 275 days	Indian National Congress	Raghbir Singh	Yadavindra Singh

=== Punjab ===
BJS (1) INC (3) SAD (1)
Sr. No.	Name (constituency) (birth-death)	Portrait	Term of office			Political party	Chief Minister	Appointed by	Ref
No official Deputy CM (15 August 1947 - 17 February 1969) (21 years, 186 days)
1	Balram Das Tandon (Amritsar Central) (1927-2018)		17 February 1969	26 March 1970	1 year, 37 days	Bhartiya Jana Sangh	Gurnam Singh	D. C. Pavate	
No official Deputy CM (26 March 1970 - 6 August 1996) (26 years, 134 days)
2	Rajinder Kaur Bhattal (Lehra) (b.1945)		6 August 1996	21 November 1996	107 days	Indian National Congress	Harcharan Singh Brar	B. K. N. Chhibber	
No official Deputy CM (21 November 1996 - 6 January 2004) (7 years, 46 days)
(2)	Rajinder Kaur Bhattal (Lehra) (b.1945)		6 January 2004	1 March 2007	3 years, 54 days	Indian National Congress	Captain Amarinder Singh	O. P. Verma	
No official Deputy CM (1 March 2007 - 21 January 2009) (1 year, 326 days)
3	Sukhbir Singh Badal ( - ) (b.1962)		21 January 2009	1 July 2009	161 days	Shiromani Akali Dal	Prakash Singh Badal	S. F. Rodrigues	
No official Deputy CM (1 July 2009 - 10 August 2009) (40 days)
(3)	Sukhbir Singh Badal (Jalalabad) (b.1962)		10 August 2009	14 March 2012	7 years, 218 days	Shiromani Akali Dal	Prakash Singh Badal	S. F. Rodrigues	
(3)	Sukhbir Singh Badal (Jalalabad) (b.1962)		14 March 2012	16 March 2017	7 years, 218 days	Shiromani Akali Dal	Prakash Singh Badal	Shivraj Patil	
No official Deputy CM (16 March 2017 - 20 September 2021) (4 years, 188 days)
4	Sukhjinder Singh (Dera Baba Nanak) (b.1959)		20 September 2021	16 March 2022	177 days	Indian National Congress	Charanjit Singh Channi	Banwarilal Purohit	
4	Om Parkash Soni (Amritsar Central) (b.1957)		20 September 2021	16 March 2022	177 days	Indian National Congress	Charanjit Singh Channi	Banwarilal Purohit	
No official Deputy CM (since 16 March 2022) (4 years, 194 days)

== Statistics ==
=== List of deputy chief minister by their tenure ===
#	Deputy Chief Minister	Total Terms	Party	Term of office	
#	Deputy Chief Minister	Total Terms	Party	Longest continuous term	Total duration of deputy chief ministership
1	Sukhbir Singh Badal	3	SAD	7 Years, 218 Days	8 Years, 14 Days
2	Rajinder Kaur Bhattal	2	INC	3 Years, 54 Days	3 Years, 161 Days
3	Balram Das Tandon	1	ABJS	1 Year, 37 Days	
4	Sukhjinder Singh Randhawa	1	INC	177 Days	
5	Om Parkash Soni	1	INC	177 Days	

== Oath as the state deputy chief minister ==
The deputy chief minister serves five years in the office. The following is the oath of the Deputy chief minister of state:

I, <Name of Deputy Chief Minister>, do swear in the name of God/solemnly affirm that I will bear true faith and allegiance to the Constitution of India as by law established, that I will uphold the sovereignty and integrity of India, that I will faithfully and conscientiously discharge my duties as a Minister for the State of () and that I will do right to all manner of people in accordance with the Constitution and the law without fear or favour, affection or ill-will.

Oath of Secrecy

"I, [Name], do swear in the name of God / solemnly affirm that I will not directly or indirectly communicate or reveal to any person or persons any matter which shall be brought under my consideration or shall become known to me as a Minister for the State of [Name of State] except as may be required for the due discharge of my duties as such Minister. A. Oath of Office (Padd di Saunh) "Main, [Name], Ishwar di saunh khanda han / sachcha vishwas dilaunda han ki main kanoon valon sthapit Bharat de Samvidhan (Constitution) prati sachchi shradha te nishtha rakhanga. Main Bharat di prabhusatta (sovereignty) te akhandta (integrity) nu barqrar rakhanga. Main [State Name] de Mukkh Mantri (Chief Minister) vajeon apne farzan nu imaandari te poori nishtha naal nibhavanga, te main bina kise darr, pakhpaat, lalach ya vaer-virodh de, Samvidhan ate kanoon de mutabiq sabhi loka naal nayaa (justice) karanga."

B. Oath of Secrecy (Gupat-ta di Saunh) "Main, [Name], Ishwar di saunh khanda han / sachcha vishwas dilaunda han ki jo vi mamla [State Name] de Mukkh Mantri vajeon mere vichar layi lyaya javega ya mainu pata laggega, usnu main kise vi vyakti ya vyaktian nu, pratyaksh (directly) ya apratyaksh (indirectly) roop vich udon tak sanjha (reveal) nahi karanga, jado tak ki mere farzan nu poora karan layi ajeha karna zaroori na hove."

== Deputy leader of the house ==
The Deputy Leader of the House in Vidhan Sabha is the deputy parliamentary chairperson of the party that holds a majority in the Vidhan Sabha and is responsible for government business in the house. The deputy chief minister also serves as deputy leader of the house, however, in the absence of an official deputy chief minister, one of the cabinet minister serves as deputy leader of the house.

Name	Tenure		Party	Leader of the House	Assembly
Swaran Singh	15 August 1947	20 June 1951	Indian National Congress	Gopi Chand Bhargava & Bhim Sen Sachhar	Interim Assembly
Partap Singh Kairon	17 April 1952	23 January 1956	Indian National Congress	Bhimsen Sachhar	1st
Sher Singh Kadyan	23 January 1956	9 April 1957	Indian National Congress	Partap Singh Kairon	1st
Gyani Kartar Singh	9 April 1957	11 March 1962	Indian National Congress	Partap Singh Kairon	2nd
Mohan Lal	11 March 1962	21 June 1964	Indian National Congress	Partap Singh Kairon	3rd
Balram Das Tandon	17 February 1969	26 March 1970	Bhartiya Jana Sangh	Gurnam Singh	5th
Surjit Singh Barnala	26 March 1970	14 June 1971	Shiromani Akali Dal	Prakash Singh Badal	5th
Kewal Krishan	6 June 1980	6 October 1983	Indian National Congress	Darbara Singh	8th
Harcharan Singh Brar	25 February 1992	31 August 1995	Indian National Congress	Beant Singh	10th
Rajinder Kaur Bhattal	31 August 1995	21 November 1996	Indian National Congress	Harcharan Singh Brar	10th
Balram Das Tandon	12 February 1997	26 February 2002	Bhartiya Janata Party	Prakash Singh Badal	11th
Rajinder Kaur Bhattal	26 February 2002	1 March 2007	Indian National Congress	Amarinder Singh	12th
Manpreet Singh Badal	1 March 2007	10 August 2009	Shiromani Akali Dal	Prakash Singh Badal	13th
Sukhbir Singh Badal	10 August 2009	14 March 2012	Shiromani Akali Dal	Prakash Singh Badal	13th
Sukhbir Singh Badal	14 March 2012	16 March 2017	Shiromani Akali Dal	Prakash Singh Badal	14th
Brahm Mohindra	16 March 2017	20 September 2021	Indian National Congress	Amarinder Singh	15th
Sukhjinder Singh Randhawa	20 September 2021	16 March 2022	Indian National Congress	Charanjit Singh Channa	15th
Harpal Singh Cheema	19 March 2022	Incumbent	Aam Admi Party	Bhagwant Mann	16th

== See also ==
- List of chief ministers of Punjab, India
- List of current Indian deputy chief ministers
- List of female deputy chief ministers in India
