= Om Parkash Soni =

Indian politician

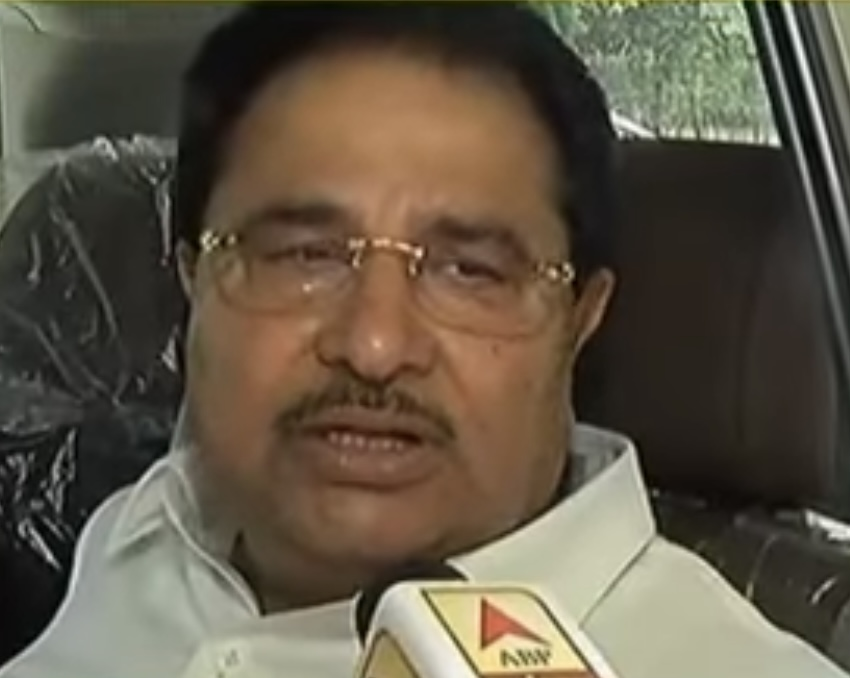

Deputy Chief Minister of Punjab
- In office 20 September 2021 – 11 March 2022 Serving with Sukhjinder Singh Randhawa
- Governor: Banwarilal Purohit
- Chief Minister: Charanjit Singh Channi
- Preceded by: Sukhbir Singh Badal

Member of Punjab Legislative Assembly
- In office 2012–2022
- Preceded by: Laxmi Kanta Chawla
- Succeeded by: Ajay Gupta
- Constituency: Amritsar Central
- In office 1997–2012
- Preceded by: constituency created
- Succeeded by: Raj Kumar Verka
- Constituency: Amritsar West

Personal details
- Born: 3 July 1957 (age 68) Bhilowal
- Party: Indian National Congress
- Spouse: Suman Soni

Om Parkash Soni is an Indian politician and Former Deputy Chief Minister of Punjab who belongs to the Indian National Congress. He is a member of Punjab Legislative Assembly represents Amritsar Central. He was also a Cabinet Minister in the government of Punjab and head of the School Education department. He was sworn as Deputy CM on 20th Sept 2021.

== Family ==
He was born on 3 July 1957 at village Bhilowal Pakka in Amritsar district of Punjab. His father's name is Jagat Mitter Soni. The name of his spouse is Suman Soni.

== Political career ==
Soni was elected for Punjab Legislative Assembly from Amritsar West in 1997 as an independent candidate. He was re-elected in 2002 elections. In 2007, he successfully contested as Congress candidate Amritsar West. In 2012, he successfully contested from Amritsar Central.

Soni was one of the 42 INC MLAs who submitted their resignation in protest of a decision of the Supreme Court of India ruling Punjab's termination of the Sutlej-Yamuna Link (SYL) water canal unconstitutional.

In March 2017, he was again elected from Amritsar Central Assembly constituency by defeating its nearest opponent Tarun Chugh of BJP with a margin of 21,116 votes. In April 2018, he was made a cabinet minister of Punjab and given the charge of School Education department.
