= List of female opposition leaders in India =

Female Leaders of the Opposition in the Republic of India

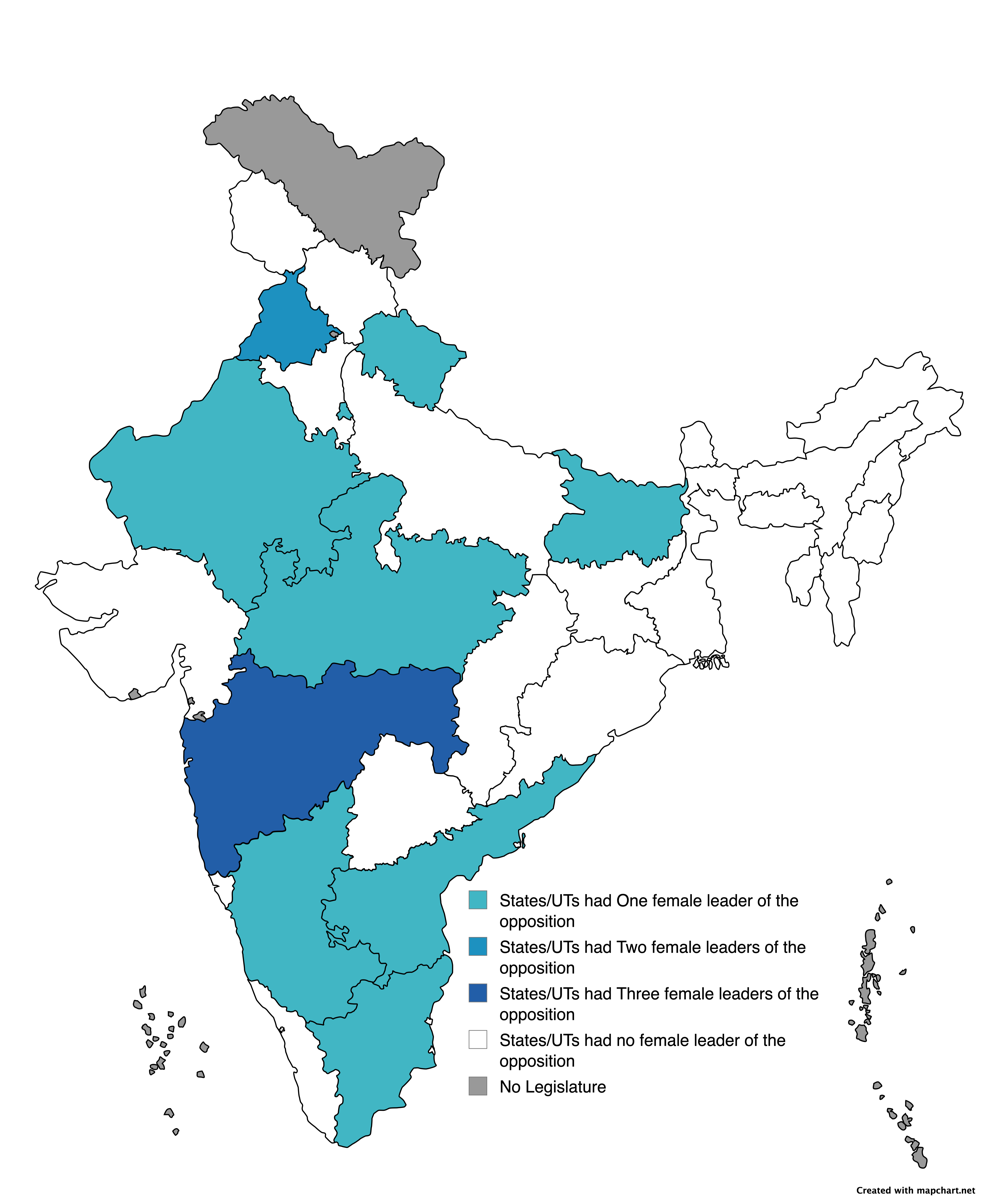
Map representing the number of female leaders of the opposition in different states and union territories of India

The leader of the opposition is the politician who leads the official opposition in the State legislative assemblies of India and State legislative councils of India. Official Opposition is a term used in legislative Assemblies to designate the political party which has secured the second largest number of seat assembly. In order to get formal recognition, the party must have at least 10% of the total membership of the Legislative Assembly. A single party has to meet the 10% seat criterion, not an alliance. Many of the Indian state legislatures also follow this 10% rule, while the rest of them prefer the single largest opposition party according to the rules of their respective houses.

As of 22 November 2026, 13 women have served as leaders of the opposition in 9 out of 28 state assemblies and 1 out of 3 Union Territory assemblies, while only two women have served in two of the seven legislative councils. The first female leader of the opposition was Arutla Kamala Devi of Andhra Pradesh when she became leader of the opposition in the legislative assembly in February 1964. C. Motamma is the first female leader of the opposition in the state legislative council. Jamuna Devi was the longest-serving leader of the opposition, followed by Rajinder Kaur Bhattal. Maharashtra and Punjab are the only two states that had three and two female leaders of the opposition, respectively. Rabri Devi is the only female leader who served as the leader of the opposition in both the legislative assembly and legislative council of her respective state Bihar. Jamuna Devi and Indira Hridayesh are the only two who died in the office.

Among these 14 women leaders of opposition in both houses, four also served as leader of the house (also Chief Minister) of their respective state. These were Rajinder Kaur Bhattal, Rabri Devi, Vasundhra Raje and Atishi Marlena. While J. Jayalalithaa served as Chief Minister but not the leader of the house. Only Jayalalithaa, Rajinder Kaur and Jamuna Devi served two non-consecutive terms in state legislative assemblies, while Rabri Devi served three non-consecutive terms in the state legislative council. Andhra Pradesh, Arunachal Pradesh, Assam, Chhattisgarh, Goa, Gujarat, Haryana, Himachal Pradesh, Jharkhand, Jammu and Kashmir , Kerala, Maharashtra, Manipur, Meghalaya, Mizoram , Nagaland, Tripura, Sikkim ,Telangana Uttar Pradesh doesn't have woman opposition leader.

Rabri Devi is the incumbent female leader of the opposition in Bihar Legislative Council. Atishi Marlena is the incumbent leader of opposition in Delhi Legislative Assembly.

== Lok Sabha ==
No.	Portrait	Name	Constituency	Tenure			Lok Sabha	Party.
1		Sonia Gandhi	Amethi	31 October 1999	6 February 2004	4 years, 98 days	13th	Indian National Congress
2		Sushma Swaraj	Vidisha	21 December 2009	19 May 2014	4 years, 149 days	15th	Bharatiya Janata Party

== State legislature ==
=== State legislative councils ===
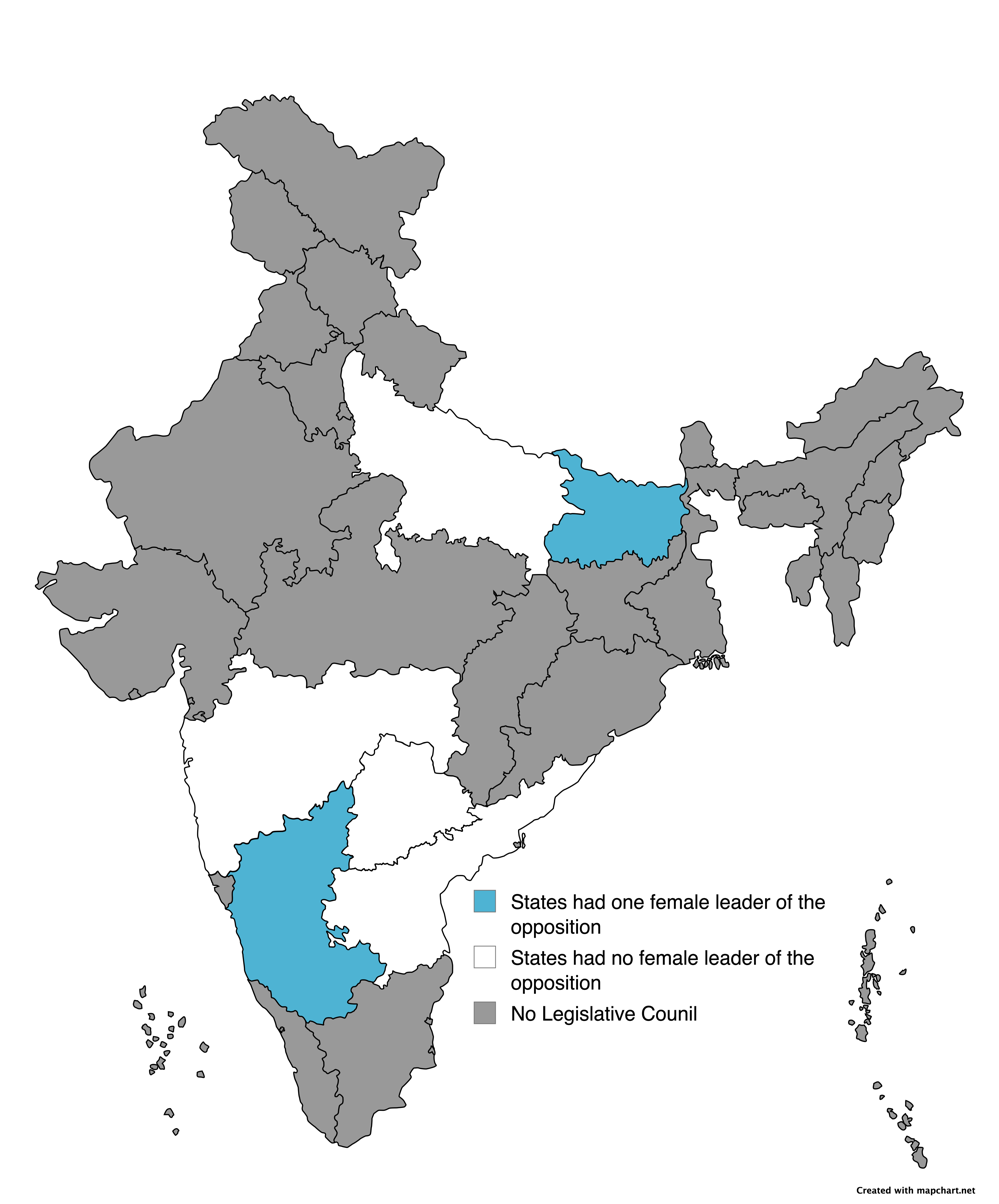
Map shows the number of the female leader of the opposition in Indian States legislative councils.

Key

- * Incumbent leader of the opposition
- ^{†} Died in office

INC (1) RJD (1)
No.	Portrait	Name (Birth–Death)	Term of office			State	Political party	Chief Minister	Ref
No.	Portrait	Name (Birth–Death)	Assumed office	Left office	Time in office	State	Political party	Chief Minister	Ref
1		C. Motamma (b. 1951)	1 September 2010	17 June 2012	1 year, 290 days	Karnataka	Indian National Congress	B. S. Yediyurappa & Sadananda Gowda	
2		Rabri Devi* (b. 1959)	12 May 2018	23 June 2020	2 years, 162 days	Bihar	Rashtriya Janata Dal	Nitish Kumar & Samrat Choudhary	
2		Rabri Devi* (b. 1959)	11 April 2022	9 August 2022	2 years, 162 days	Bihar	Rashtriya Janata Dal	Nitish Kumar & Samrat Choudhary	
2		Rabri Devi* (b. 1959)	16 February 2024	Incumbent	2 years, 279 days	Bihar	Rashtriya Janata Dal	Nitish Kumar & Samrat Choudhary	

=== State legislative assemblies ===
Key

- ^{RES} Resigned
- ^{†} Died in office
- * Incumbent leader of the opposition

AAP (1) AIADMK (1) BJP (1) CPI (1) INC (7) JP (1) RJD (1)
No.	Portrait	Name (Birth–Death)	Term of office			State/Union territory	Political party	Government		Ref
No.	Portrait	Name (Birth–Death)	Assumed office	Left office	Time in office	State/Union territory	Political party	Chief Minister	Party	Ref
1		Arutla Kamala Devi (1920-2001)	21 February 1964	1 March 1967	3 years, 8 days	Andhra Pradesh	Communist Party of India	Kasu Brahmananda Reddy	Indian National Congress	
2		Prabha Rau (1935-2010)	? February 1979	13 July 1979	~5-6 months	Maharashtra	Indian National Congress	Sharad Pawar	Indian Congress (Socialist)	
3		Pratibha Patil (b. 1934)	16 July 1979	17 February 1980	216 days	Maharashtra	Indian National Congress	Sharad Pawar	Indian Congress (Socialist)	
4		Gurbinder Kaur Brar (1922-2013)	29 September 1985	11 May 1987	1 year, 224 days	Punjab	Indian National Congress	Surjit Singh Barnala	Shiromani Akali Dal	
5		K. S. Nagarathnamma (1923-1993)	29 January 1987	21 April 1989	2 years, 85 days	Karnataka	Indian National Congress	Ramakrishna Hegde & S. R. Bommai	Janata Party	
6		Mrinal Gore (1928-2012)	23 December 1988	19 October 1989	300 days	Maharashtra	Janata Party	Sharad Pawar	Indian National Congress	
7		J. Jayalalithaa (1948–2016)	9 February 1989	1 December 1989^{[RES]}	5 years, 280 days	Tamil Nadu	All India Anna Dravida Munnetra Kazhagam	M. Karunanidhi	Dravida Munnetra Kazhagam	
7		J. Jayalalithaa (1948–2016)	29 May 2006	14 May 2011	5 years, 280 days	Tamil Nadu	All India Anna Dravida Munnetra Kazhagam	M. Karunanidhi	Dravida Munnetra Kazhagam	
8		Rajinder Kaur Bhattal (b. 1945)	12 February 1997	10 October 1998^{[RES]}	6 years, 253 days	Punjab	Indian National Congress	Prakash Singh Badal	Shiromani Akali Dal	
8		Rajinder Kaur Bhattal (b. 1945)	1 March 2007	14 March 2012	6 years, 253 days	Punjab	Indian National Congress	Prakash Singh Badal	Shiromani Akali Dal	
9		Jamuna Devi (1929-2010)	16 December 2003	11 December 2008	6 years, 259 days	Madhya Pradesh	Indian National Congress	Uma Bharti, Babulal Gaur & Shivraj Singh Chauhan	Bharatiya Janata Party	
9		Jamuna Devi (1929-2010)	7 January 2009	24 September 2010^{[†]}	6 years, 259 days	Madhya Pradesh	Indian National Congress	Shivraj Singh Chauhan	Bharatiya Janata Party	
10		Rabri Devi (b. 1959)	30 November 2005	24 November 2010	4 years, 359 days	Bihar	Rashtriya Janata Dal	Nitish Kumar	Janata Dal (United)	
11		Vasundhara Raje (b. 1953)	2 January 2009	20 February 2013	4 years, 49 days	Rajasthan	Bhartiya Janata Party	Ashok Gehlot	Indian National Congress	
12		Indira Hridayesh (1941-2021)	27 March 2017	13 June 2021^{[†]}	4 years, 78 days	Uttarakhand	Indian National Congress	Trivendra Singh Rawat & Tirath Singh Rawat	Bhartiya Janata Party	
13		Atishi Marlena* (b. 1981)	23 February 2025	Incumbent	1 year, 272 days	National Capital Territory of Delhi	Aam Aadmi Party	Rekha Gupta	Bhartiya Janata Party	

== See also ==
- List of female governors in India
- List of female lieutenant governors and administrators in India
- List of female chief ministers in India
- List of female deputy chief ministers in India
- List of female legislative speakers and chairpersons in India
- List of female chief justices in India
- List of current Indian opposition leaders
