= Minster =

Minster may refer to:

- Minster (church), an honorific title given to particular churches in England

== Places ==
=== England ===
- Minster, Swale (or Minster-in-Sheppey), a town in Swale, Kent
  - Minster-on-Sea, the civil parish
- Minster-in-Thanet, a village in Thanet, Kent
- Minster, Cornwall, part of the civil parish of Forrabury and Minster
- Minster (Reading ward), a former electoral ward in Reading

=== Elsewhere ===
- Minster (river), a river in Switzerland
- Minster, Ohio, United States
- Minster Square (Freiburg im Breisgau), in the centre district of Freiburg, Germany

== Other uses ==
- Minster Machine Company, an American manufacturer of metalworking equipment
- Hilary Minster (1944–1999), English character actor
- Minster F.C., football club based in Minster-in-Thanet
- Minster FM, radio station in Dunnington, York, England

== See also ==
- Minster Son, a British Thoroughbred racehorse and sire
- Minster School (disambiguation)
- Minister (disambiguation)
