= Gupta ministry =

Gupta ministry may refer to:

Uttar Pradesh Council of Ministers

- First Chandra Bhanu Gupta ministry, the 8th government of Uttar Pradesh headed by Chandra Bhanu Gupta from 1960 to 1962
- Second Chandra Bhanu Gupta ministry, the 9th government of Uttar Pradesh headed by Chandra Bhanu Gupta from 1962 to 1963
- Third Chandra Bhanu Gupta ministry, the 22nd government of Uttar Pradesh headed by Chandra Bhanu Gupta in 1969 to 1970
- Ram Prakash Gupta ministry, the 30th government of Uttar Pradesh headed by Ram Prakash Gupta from 1999 to 2000

Delhi Council of Ministers

- Rekha Gupta ministry, the 13th government of NCT of Delhi headed by Rekha Gupta from 2025 onwards
