= List of female legislative speakers and chairpersons in India =

List of female legislative speakers and chairpersons in India lists all women who have served as speakers of national or state legislatures throughout India since the country's independence in 1947.

== Lok Sabha ==
| No. | Portrait | Speaker (Birth-Death) | Term of office | | | Political party | Lok Sabha |
| No. | Portrait | Speaker (Birth-Death) | From | To | Period | Political party | Lok Sabha |
|---|---|---|---|---|---|---|---|
| 1 | | Meira Kumar (born 1945) | 4 June 2009 | 11 June 2014 | 5 years, 1 day | Indian National Congress | 15th (2009) |
| 2 | | Sumitra Mahajan (born 1943) | 15 June 2014 | 17 June 2019 | 5 years, 4 days | Bharatiya Janata Party | 16th (2014) |

== State legislature ==
=== State legislative assemblies ===
This is the list of female Speakers of the legislative assemblies of the Indian states and union territories:

| No. | Portrait | Name (birth–death) | State | Constituency | Assumed office | Left office | Tenure | Political party |
|---|---|---|---|---|---|---|---|---|
| | | Pushpaben Mehta (1905–1988) | Saurashtra | Veraval Town | March 1952 | 1956 | 0 days | Indian National Congress |
| | | Shanno Devi (1901–1978) | Haryana | Jagadhri | 6 December 1966 | 17 March 1967 | 101 days | Indian National Congress |
| | | Vidya Stokes (born 1927) | Himachal Pradesh | Theog | 11 March 1985 | 19 March 1990 | 5 years, 8 days | Indian National Congress |
| | | K. Pratibha Bharati (born 1956) | Andhra Pradesh | Etcherla | 11 November 1999 | 30 May 2004 | 4 years, 201 days | Telugu Desam Party |
| | | Sumitra Singh (born 1930) | Rajasthan | Jhunjhunu | 16 January 2004 | 1 January 2009 | 4 years, 351 days | Bharatiya Janata Party |
| | | Nimaben Acharya (born 1947) | Gujarat | Bhuj | 27 September 2021 | 10 December 2022 | 1 year, 74 days | Bharatiya Janata Party |
| | | Ritu Khanduri Bhushan (born 1965) | Uttarakhand | Kotdwar | 26 March 2022 | Incumbent | 4 years, 96 days | Bharatiya Janata Party |
| | | Pramila Mallik | Odisha | Binjharpur | 22 September 2023 | 4 June 2024 | 256 days | Biju Janata Dal |
| | | Surama Padhy (1960–) | Odisha | Ranpur | 20 June 2024 | Incumbent | 2 years, 10 days | Bharatiya Janata Party |

== See also ==
- List of female governors in India
- List of female lieutenant governors and administrators in India
- List of female chief ministers in India
- List of female deputy chief ministers in India
- List of female opposition leaders in India
- List of female chief justices in India
- List of current Indian legislative speakers and chairpersons
