= Santosh Chowdhary =

Indian politician (born 1944)

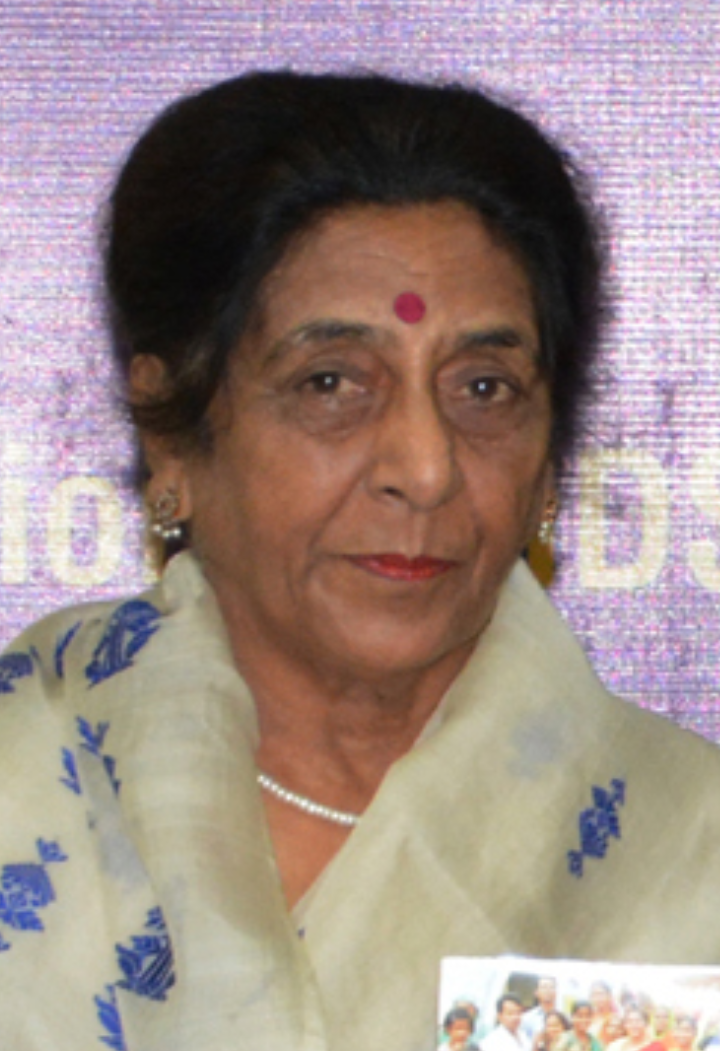

Member of Parliament, Lok Sabha
- In office 2009-2014
- Preceded by: Avinash Rai Khanna
- Succeeded by: Vijay Sampla
- Constituency: Hoshiarpur, Punjab
- In office 1999-2004
- Preceded by: Satnam Singh Kainth
- Succeeded by: Charanjit Singh Atwal
- In office 1991-1996
- Preceded by: Harbhajan Lakha
- Succeeded by: Harbhajan Lakha
- Constituency: Phillaur, Punjab

Personal details
- Born: 5 October 1944 (age 81) Solan, Punjab, British India (now in Himachal Pradesh, India)
- Party: Indian National Congress
- Spouse: R.L. Chowdhary
- Children: 4 daughters
- As of 14 August, 2012

Santosh Chowdhary (born 5 October 1944) is an Indian Politician belonging to the Indian National Congress.

== Biography ==
=== Personal life ===
She grew up in a Ravidassia family with a background in public service and politics, which influenced her early interest in social work and governance. Her father, Shri Roshan Lal, was a former member of parliament, which exposed her from a young age to political processes and public service. Santosh pursued her education diligently, earning a B.A. and B.Ed., along with additional certifications in Military Training, Home Science, Poultry, and Animal Husbandry from Panjab University and Himachal Pradesh University. In 1968, she married Shri R.L. Chowdhary, a former Member of the Legislative Assembly. Together, they have four daughters.

Her father-in-law, Chaudhary Sunder Singh, was a prominent figure in Punjab's political landscape. Chaudhary Sunder Singh served as a member of parliament and held the position of Finance Minister in Punjab. He was also the Chairperson of the Punjab Public Service Commission from 1975 to 1986 and served as a Syndicate Member of Panjab University. In addition, he was a non-official director of Punjab & Sind Bank.

=== Political Life ===
She began her parliamentary career when she was elected as a Member of Parliament from the Phillaur constituency in Punjab in 1992, serving until 1996. She regained the Phillaur seat in 1999, representing her constituency in the Lok Sabha until 2004. In 2009, she was elected to the Lok Sabha from the Hoshiarpur constituency, continuing her legislative work until 2014. During her tenure in the UPA II government, she served as the Minister of State for Health and Family Welfare from 2012 to 2014, contributing to public health policy and programs.

During the 2019 Lok Sabha elections, Chowdhary was denied a ticket to contest from the Hoshiarpur constituency. The Congress party instead fielded Raj Kumar Chabbewal, a sitting MLA with a background in the BJP, igniting controversy within the party. She alleged that the party's decision was influenced by Punjab Chief Minister Captain Amarinder Singh, accusing him of favoring a political newcomer over a seasoned Congress member. Chowdhary claimed that her husband, R.L. Chowdhary, had died in 2017 due to the shock of being denied a ticket in the state assembly elections and questioned what test the party was now putting her through by denying her the Hoshiarpur seat.
