= Bhagat Ram =

Indian politician

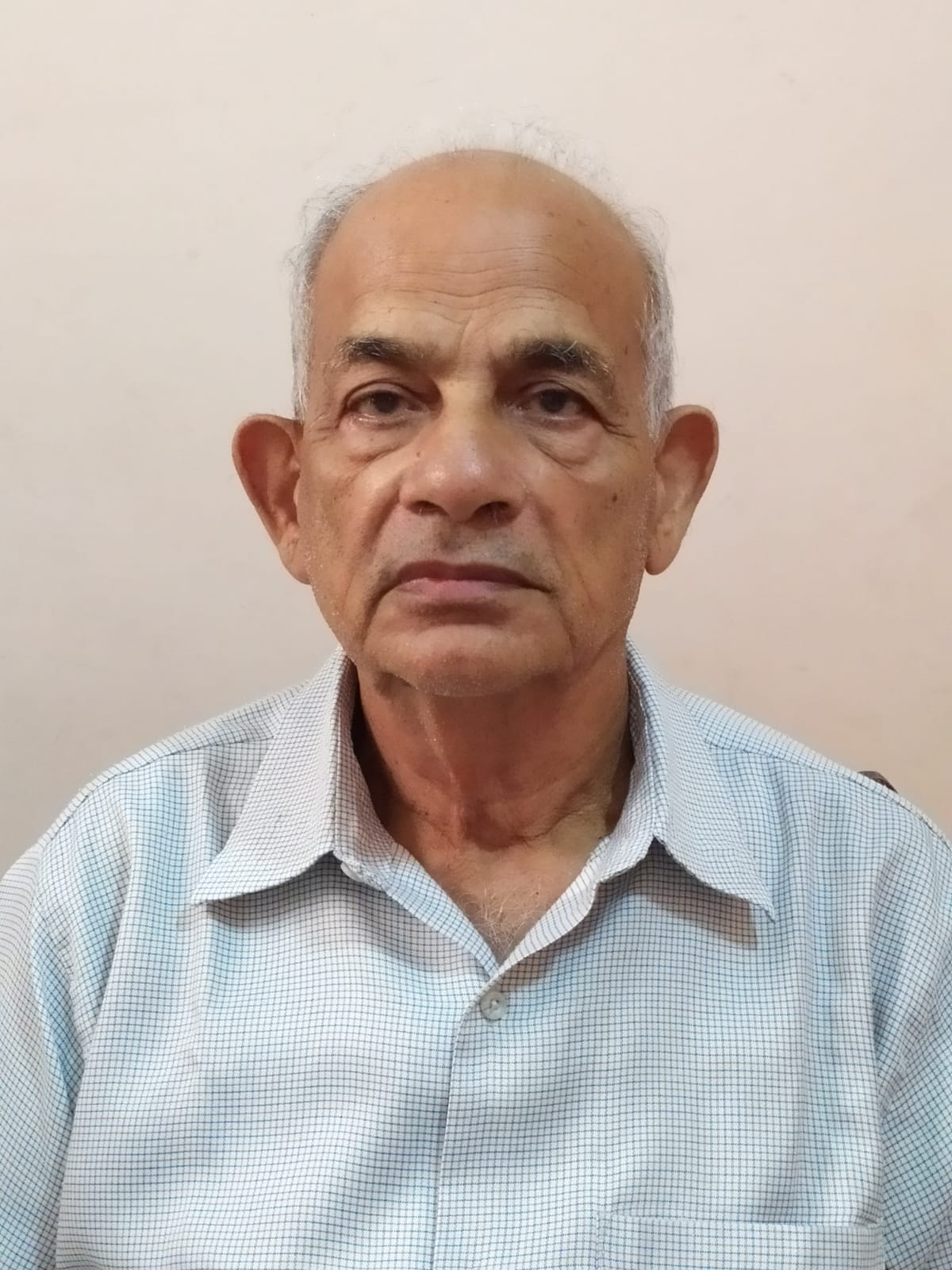

Member of Parliament, Lok Sabha
- In office 1977-1980
- Preceded by: Chaudhary Sadhu Ram
- Succeeded by: Chaudhary Sunder Singh
- Constituency: Phillaur Punjab

Personal details
- Born: 2 November 1942 Dhaliwal Kadian, Jullundur Punjab, British India
- Died: 30 March 2025 (aged 82) Brampton, Ontario, Canada
- Citizenship: India
- Party: Communist Party of India (Marxist)
- Spouse: Satya Devi
- Children: 4; 2 sons and 2 daughters
- Parent(s): Shri Baru Ram (father), Dhan Devi (mother)

Bhagat Ram is an Indian politician. He was elected to the Lok Sabha, the lower house of the Parliament of India from the Phillaur constituency of Punjab as a member of the Communist Party of India (Marxist).

He firmly believes in and working for the victory of Secularism, communal harmony, national unity, upliftment of toiling people, democracy, Socialism and Marxism.

Bhagat Ram died on March 30, 2025, in Brampton, Ontario, shortly after being diagnosed with esophageal cancer. In his final days, he experienced respiratory complications, and his lungs failed to recover. His death was met with tributes from colleagues and admirers who recognized his contributions.

== Personal life and career ==
Bhagat Ram was married to Satya Devi, who died on February 7, 2021. The couple had four children—two sons and two daughters. He identifies as a non-believer in religion.

Bhagat Ram had a teaching career spanning 16 years, serving in secondary schools from 1961 to 1977. He held the position of Headmaster at Government Middle School, Sunner Kalan, in Jalandhar district before resigning in 1977 to contest the Lok Sabha elections.

He served as a Member of Parliament (MP) from 1977 to 1980, representing the Phillaur (Jalandhar) Parliamentary Constituency as a candidate of the Communist Party of India (Marxist) [CPI(M)]. Over the years, he contested the Lok Sabha elections from Phillaur as a CPI(M) candidate six times, in 1977, 1980, 1985, 1989, 1992, and 1996. Additionally, he contested the Vidhan Sabha election from the Banga Assembly Constituency in 1980 as a CPI(M) candidate.

=== Social and political activities ===
Bhagat Ram was deeply involved in political and social work, dedicating his efforts to serving the downtrodden and advocating for their rights. He was also active in trade union activities, which reflected his commitment to social justice and workers' welfare.

During his tenure as a Member of Parliament, Bhagat Ram played a pivotal role in facilitating the establishment of the first passport office in Punjab, located in Jalandhar. At a time when large numbers of residents from the region were beginning to migrate abroad, particularly from Jalandhar, access to passport services was limited to the office in Chandigarh. His efforts addressed the increasing demand for local passport services, significantly easing the process for aspiring emigrants in the Doaba region.

=== Interests and hobbies ===
In his leisure time, Bhagat Ram enjoyed reading and participating in trade union activities. His special interests included working to uplift marginalized communities and addressing social inequalities.

== Political history ==
Served as member of the following Parliamentary Committees during 1977 to 1980:

- 1977-1980: Posts and Telecommunications Consultative committee
- 1979-1980: Parliamentary Committee on Welfare of Scheduled castes and scheduled Tribes
- 1978-1980: Committee on Government Assurances (Lok Sabha)
- 1977-1980: Member of the Institute Body of PGI Chandigarh
- Since 1979: Associate Life Member of Indian Parliamentary Group
- 1979: Visited as Member of Parliamentary Delegations to Bulgaria and Romania

=== Contribution to Lok Sabha proceedings ===
- Bhagat Ram raised numerous issues of public and national interest in the Lok Sabha, focusing on the concerns of the working class, agricultural workers, farmers, employees, Scheduled Castes, Scheduled Tribes, Other Backward Classes (OBC), and the overall development of the country.
- In 1978, he introduced a Constitutional Amendment Bill as a private member's bill to amend Articles 310 and 311 of the Constitution. The bill sought to remove provisions considered anti-employee, anti-natural justice, and anti-democratic. The bill was debated extensively for approximately five hours across four sessions during 1978–1979 but was ultimately defeated by voting in the Lok Sabha.

== Publications ==
Title	Date	Ref.
Adhyapak Lehar	1972-1974	
Parliamentary Debate On Constitution Amendment Bill 1978 - To remove Anti Employees Articles 310, 311 (2C)	1978	
