= Minister =

Minister may refer to:

- Minister (Christianity), a Christian cleric
  - Minister (Catholic Church)
- Minister (government), a member of government who heads a ministry (government department)
  - Minister without portfolio, a member of government with the rank of a normal minister but who does not head a ministry
  - Shadow minister, a member of a Shadow Cabinet of the opposition
  - Minister (Austria)
- Minister (diplomacy), the rank of diplomat directly below ambassador
- Minister, a font from Schriftguss AG
- Ministerialis, a member of a noble class in the Holy Roman Empire
- The Minister, a 2011 French-Belgian film directed by Pierre Schöller

== See also ==
- Ministry (disambiguation)
- Minster (disambiguation)
- Yes Minister
