= List of female governors in India =

In India, a governor is the constitutional head of each of the twenty-eight states. The governor is appointed by the President of India for a term of five years, and holds office at the President's pleasure. The governor is de jure head of the state government; all its executive actions are taken in the governor's name. However, the governor must act on the advice of the popularly elected council of ministers, headed by the chief minister, who thus hold de facto executive authority at the state-level. The Constitution of India also empowers the governor to act upon their own discretion, such as the ability to appoint or dismiss a ministry, recommend President's rule, or reserve bills for the President's assent. Over the years, the exercise of these discretionary powers have given rise to conflict between the elected chief minister and the union government–appointed governor.

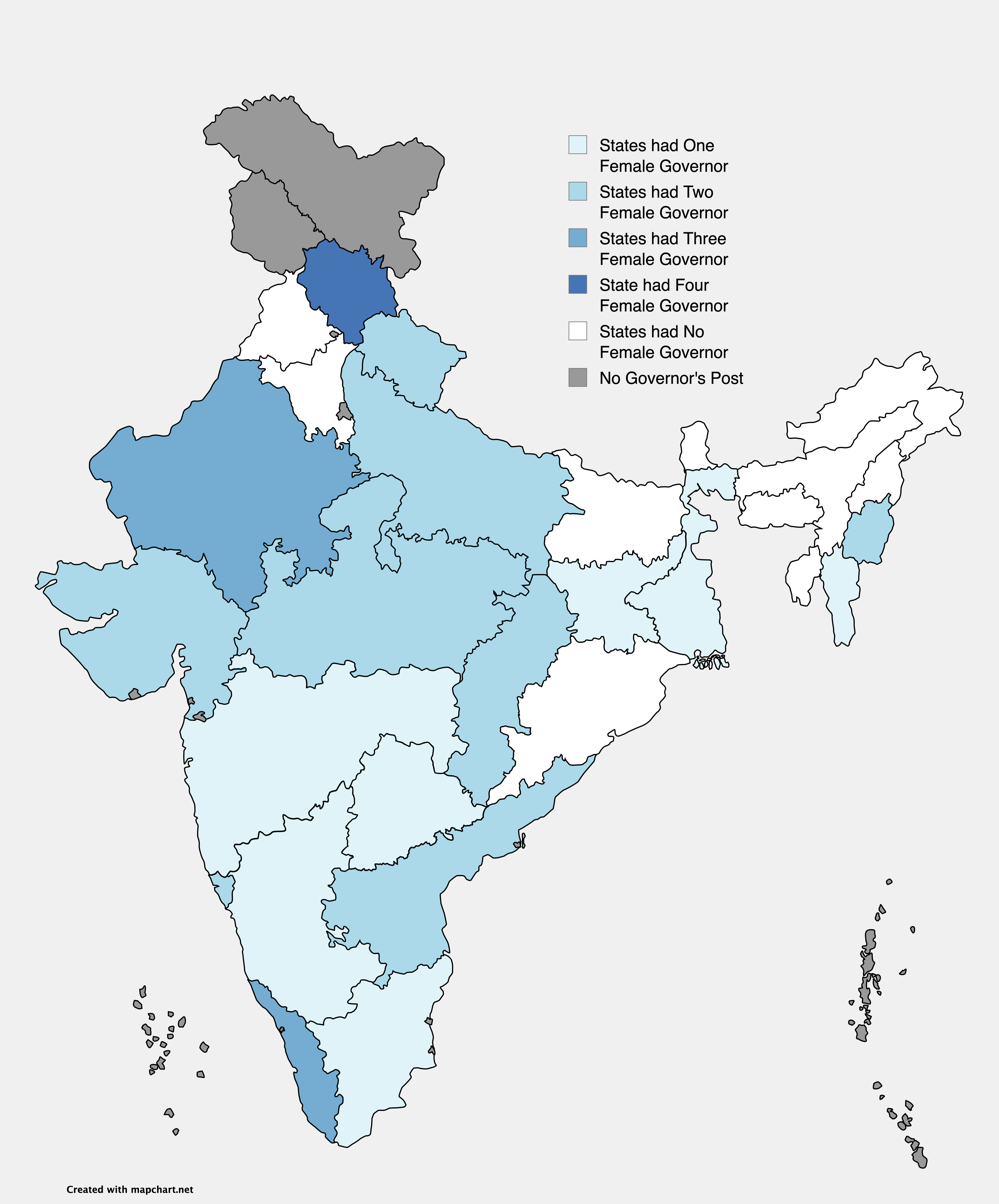
Map showing the number of the female Governors, Lieutenant Governors and Administrators served in Indian States and Union Territories

Sarojini Naidu was the first woman to become the governor of an Indian state. She governed Uttar Pradesh from 15 August 1947 to 2 March 1949. Her daughter, Padmaja Naidu, is the longest-serving female governor with almost 11 years tenure in West Bengal. Tamilisai Soundararajan is the recentmost appointment as the first female governor of Telangana. Pratibha Patil and Draupadi Murmu later served as head of the state of India (President of India). States Assam, Bihar, Gujarat, Haryana, Maharashtra, Manipur, Meghalaya, Nagaland, Odisha, Punjab, Sikkim, Telangana, Tripura, West Bengal doesn't have any woman governor.

== Chronological list ==
Key

* Incumbent governor

| No. | Image | Name | From | To | Term length | State | Ref. |
|---|---|---|---|---|---|---|---|
| 1 | | Sarojini Naidu | 15 August 1947 | 2 March 1949 | 1 year, 199 days | United Provinces | |
| 2 | | Padmaja Naidu | 3 November 1956 | 31 May 1967 | 10 years, 209 days | West Bengal | |
| 3 | | Vijayalakshmi Pandit | 28 November 1962 | 18 October 1964 | 1 year, 325 days | Maharashtra | |
| 4 | | Sharda Mukherjee | 5 May 1977 | 14 August 1978 | 1 year, 101 days | Andhra Pradesh | |
| 4 | | Sharda Mukherjee | 14 August 1978 | 5 August 1983 | 4 years, 356 days | Gujarat | |
| 5 | | Jothi Venkatachalam | 14 October 1977 | 27 October 1982 | 5 years, 13 days | Kerala | |
| 6 | | Kumudben Joshi | 26 November 1985 | 2 February 1990 | 4 years, 68 days | Andhra Pradesh | |
| 7 | | Ram Dulari Sinha | 23 February 1988 | 12 February 1990 | 1 year, 354 days | Kerala | |
| 8 | | Sarla Grewal | 31 March 1989 | 5 February 1990 | 311 days | Madhya Pradesh | |
| 9 | | Sheila Kaul | 17 November 1995 | 23 April 1996 | 158 days | Himachal Pradesh | |
| 10 | | Fathima Beevi | 25 January 1997 | 1 July 2001 | 4 years, 157 days | Tamil Nadu | |
| 11 | | V. S. Ramadevi | 26 July 1997 | 1 December 1999 | 2 years, 128 days | Himachal Pradesh | |
| 11 | | V. S. Ramadevi | 2 December 1999 | 20 August 2002 | 2 years, 261 days | Karnataka | |
| 12 | | Pratibha Patil | 8 November 2004 | 23 June 2007 | 2 years, 227 days | Rajasthan | |
| 13 | | Prabha Rau | 19 July 2008 | 24 January 2010 | 1 year, 189 days | Himachal Pradesh | |
| 13 | | Prabha Rau | 25 January 2010 | 26 April 2010 | 91 days | Rajasthan | |
| 14 | | Margaret Alva | 6 August 2009 | 14 May 2012 | 2 years, 262 days | Uttarakhand | |
| 14 | | Margaret Alva | 12 May 2012 | 7 August 2014 | 2 years, 85 days | Rajasthan | |
| 14 | | Margaret Alva | 12 July 2014 | 7 August 2014 | 54 days | Goa | |
| 15 | | Kamla Beniwal | 27 November 2009 | 6 July 2014 | 4 years, 221 days | Gujarat | |
| 15 | | Kamla Beniwal | 6 July 2014 | 6 August 2014 | 31 days | Mizoram | |
| 16 | | Urmila Singh | 25 January 2010 | 27 January 2015 | 5 years, 2 days | Himachal Pradesh | |
| 17 | | Sheila Dikshit | 11 March 2014 | 25 August 2014 | 167 days | Kerala | |
| 18 | | Mridula Sinha | 31 August 2014 | 2 November 2019 | 5 years, 63 days | Goa | |
| 19 | | Droupadi Murmu | 18 May 2015 | 13 July 2021 | 6 years, 56 days | Jharkhand | |
| 20 | | Najma Heptulla | 21 August 2016 | 10 August 2021 | 4 years, 354 days | Manipur | |
| 21 | | Anandiben Patel* | 23 January 2018 | 28 July 2019 | 1 year, 186 days | Madhya Pradesh | |
| 21 | | Anandiben Patel* | 15 August 2018 | 28 July 2019 | 347 days | Chhattisgarh | |
| 21 | | Anandiben Patel* | 29 July 2019 | Incumbent | 7 years, 109 days | Uttar Pradesh | |
| 22 | | Baby Rani Maurya | 26 August 2018 | 15 September 2021 | 3 years, 20 days | Uttarakhand | |
| 23 | | Anusuiya Uikey | 29 July 2019 | 22 February 2023 | 3 years, 208 days | Chhattisgarh | |
| 23 | | Anusuiya Uikey | 23 February 2023 | 26 July 2024 | 1 year, 154 days | Manipur | |
| 24 | | Tamilisai Soundararajan | 8 September 2019 | 18 March 2024 | 4 years, 192 days | Telangana | |
| 25 | | Sudha Yadav* | 16 October 2026 | Incumbent | 30 days | Karnataka | |

== See also ==
- List of female lieutenant governors and administrators in India
- List of female chief ministers in India
- List of female deputy chief ministers in India
- List of female legislative speakers and chairpersons in India
- List of female opposition leaders in India
- List of female chief justices in India
- List of current Indian governors
