= List of female chief ministers in India =

Women Chief Ministers of the Republic of India

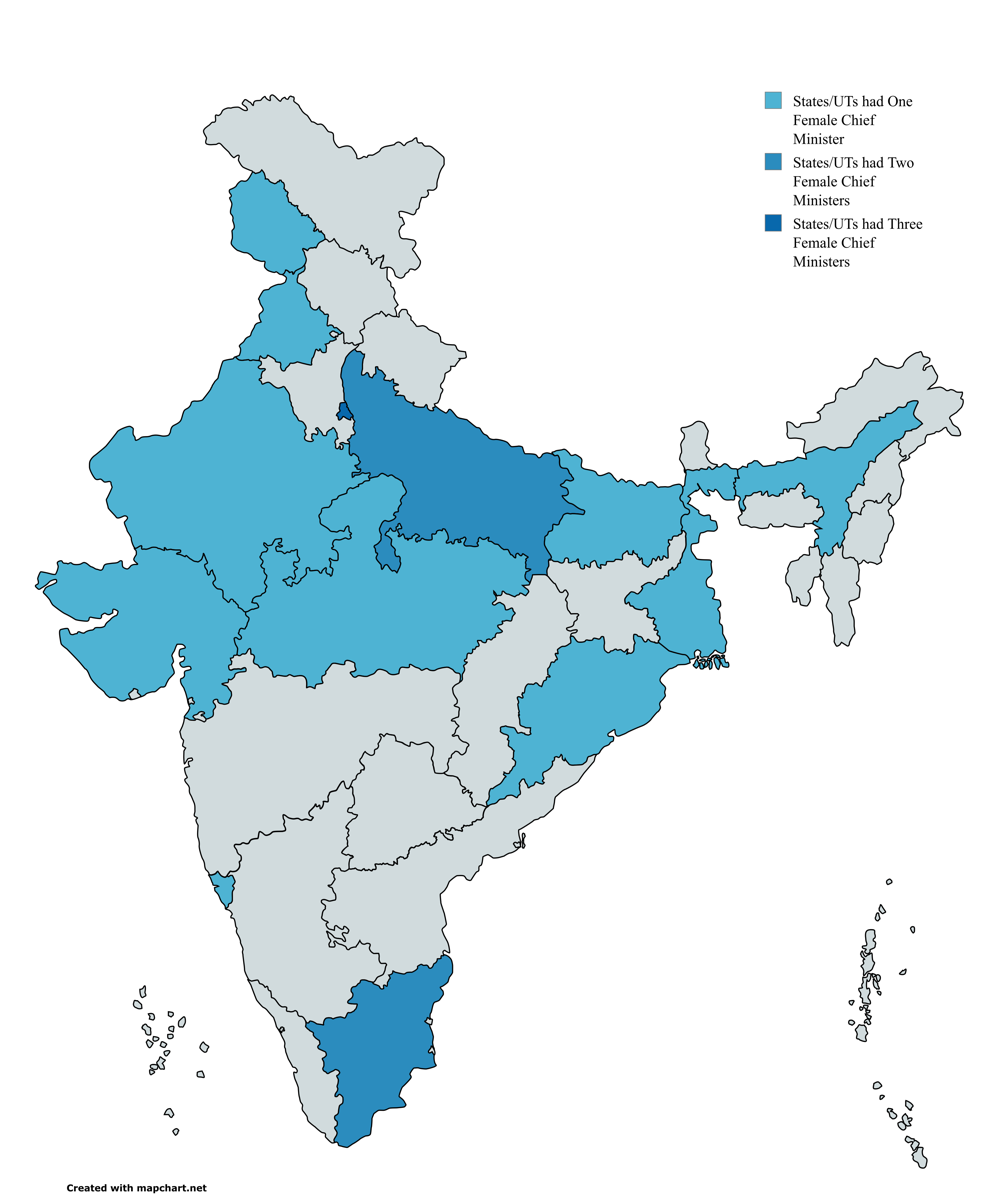
Map representing the number of female chief ministers in different states and union territories of India

The chief minister is the chief executive of the Indian state. In accordance with the Constitution of India, the governor is a state's de jure head, but de facto executive authority rests with the chief minister. Following elections to the legislative assembly, the state's governor usually invites the party (or coalition) with a majority of seats to form the government. The governor appoints the chief minister, whose council of ministers are collectively responsible to the assembly. Given that she has the confidence of the assembly, the chief minister's term is for five years and is subject to no term limits.

Since 1963, India has had 18 female chief ministers. The first woman to become chief minister was Sucheta Kripalani of the Indian National Congress, who was sworn in on 2 October 1963 as chief minister of Uttar Pradesh. The longest-serving female chief minister was Sheila Dikshit of the Indian National Congress, who served as the chief minister of the National Capital Territory of Delhi and held the office for over fifteen years. Mamata Banerjee of the All India Trinamool Congress served as chief minister of West Bengal and holds the second-longest tenure among female chief ministers. J. Jayalalithaa, from the All India Anna Dravida Munnetra Kazhagam, served as chief minister of Tamil Nadu and has the third-longest tenure; she remained in office until her death in 2016, becoming the first female chief minister to die while in office. In contrast, V. N. Janaki Ramachandran, also from Tamil Nadu and the same party, had the shortest tenure, serving only 23 days. Only 12 states and 1 union territory in India have had female chief ministers out of 28 states and 3 union territories that have legislative systems.

Rekha Gupta of National Capital Territory of Delhi is the only incumbent female chief minister in India.

== Chief ministers ==
Key

- * Incumbent chief minister
- ^{†} Assassinated or died in office
- ^{RES} Resigned
- ^{NC} Resigned following a no-confidence motion

AAP (1) AIADMK (2) AITC (1) BJP (5) BSP (1) INC (5) JKPDP (1) MGP(1) RJD (1)
| No. | Portrait | Name (Birth–Death) | State/Union territory | Term of office | | | Political party (Note: This column only names the chief minister's party. The state government she heads may be a complex coalition of several parties and independents; these are not listed here.) |
| No. | Portrait | Name (Birth–Death) | State/Union territory | Assumed office | Left office | Time in office | Political party |
|---|---|---|---|---|---|---|---|
| 1 | | Sucheta Kripalani (1908–1974) | Uttar Pradesh | 2 October 1963 | 13 March 1967 | 3 years, 162 days | Indian National Congress |
| 2 | | Nandini Satpathy (1931–2006) | Odisha | 14 June 1972 | 16 December 1976^{[RES]} | 4 years, 185 days | Indian National Congress |
| 3 | | Shashikala Kakodkar (1935–2016) | Goa | 12 August 1973 | 27 April 1979 | 5 years, 258 days | Maharashtrawadi Gomantak Party |
| 4 | | Anwara Taimur (1936–2020) | Assam | 6 December 1980 | 30 June 1981 | 206 days | Indian National Congress |
| 5 | | V. N. Janaki Ramachandran (1923–1996) | Tamil Nadu | 7 January 1988 | 30 January 1988 | 23 days | All India Anna Dravida Munnetra Kazhagam |
| 6 | | J. Jayalalithaa (1948–2016) | Tamil Nadu | 24 June 1991 | 12 May 1996 | 14 years, 124 days | All India Anna Dravida Munnetra Kazhagam |
| 6 | | J. Jayalalithaa (1948–2016) | Tamil Nadu | 14 May 2001 | 21 September 2001^{[RES]} | 14 years, 124 days | All India Anna Dravida Munnetra Kazhagam |
| 6 | | J. Jayalalithaa (1948–2016) | Tamil Nadu | 2 March 2002 | 12 May 2006 | 14 years, 124 days | All India Anna Dravida Munnetra Kazhagam |
| 6 | | J. Jayalalithaa (1948–2016) | Tamil Nadu | 16 May 2011 | 27 September 2014 | 14 years, 124 days | All India Anna Dravida Munnetra Kazhagam |
| 6 | | J. Jayalalithaa (1948–2016) | Tamil Nadu | 23 May 2015 | 5 December 2016^{[†]} | 14 years, 124 days | All India Anna Dravida Munnetra Kazhagam |
| 7 | | Mayawati (b. 1956) | Uttar Pradesh | 13 June 1995 | 18 October 1995 | 7 years, 5 days | Bahujan Samaj Party |
| 7 | | Mayawati (b. 1956) | Uttar Pradesh | 21 March 1997 | 21 September 1997^{[RES]} | 7 years, 5 days | Bahujan Samaj Party |
| 7 | | Mayawati (b. 1956) | Uttar Pradesh | 3 May 2002 | 29 August 2003^{[RES]} | 7 years, 5 days | Bahujan Samaj Party |
| 7 | | Mayawati (b. 1956) | Uttar Pradesh | 13 May 2007 | 15 March 2012 | 7 years, 5 days | Bahujan Samaj Party |
| 8 | | Rajinder Kaur Bhattal (b. 1945) | Punjab | 21 November 1996 | 12 February 1997 | 83 days | Indian National Congress |
| 9 | | Rabri Devi (b. 1955) | Bihar | 25 July 1997 | 11 February 1999 | 7 years, 190 days | Rashtriya Janata Dal |
| 9 | | Rabri Devi (b. 1955) | Bihar | 9 March 1999 | 2 March 2000^{[RES]} | 7 years, 190 days | Rashtriya Janata Dal |
| 9 | | Rabri Devi (b. 1955) | Bihar | 11 March 2000 | 6 March 2005 | 7 years, 190 days | Rashtriya Janata Dal |
| 10 | | Sushma Swaraj (1952–2019) | National Capital Territory of Delhi | 12 October 1998 | 3 December 1998 | 52 days | Bharatiya Janata Party |
| 11 | | Sheila Dikshit (1938–2019) | National Capital Territory of Delhi | 3 December 1998 | 28 December 2013 | 15 years, 25 days | Indian National Congress |
| 12 | | Uma Bharti (b. 1959) | Madhya Pradesh | 8 December 2003 | 23 August 2004^{[RES]} | 259 days | Bharatiya Janata Party |
| 13 | | Vasundhara Raje (b. 1953) | Rajasthan | 8 December 2003 | 12 December 2008 | 10 years, 7 days | Bharatiya Janata Party |
| 13 | | Vasundhara Raje (b. 1953) | Rajasthan | 13 December 2013 | 16 December 2018 | 10 years, 7 days | Bharatiya Janata Party |
| 14 | | Mamata Banerjee (b. 1955) | West Bengal | 20 May 2011 | 7 May 2026 | 14 years, 353 days | All India Trinamool Congress |
| 15 | | Anandiben Patel (b. 1941) | Gujarat | 22 May 2014 | 7 August 2016^{[RES]} | 2 years, 77 days | Bharatiya Janata Party |
| 16 | | Mehbooba Mufti (b. 1959) | Jammu and Kashmir | 4 April 2016 | 19 June 2018 | 2 years, 76 days | Jammu and Kashmir People’s Democratic Party |
| 17 | | Atishi (b. 1981) | National Capital Territory of Delhi | 21 September 2024 | 20 February 2025 | 152 days | Aam Aadmi Party |
| 18 | | Rekha Gupta* (b. 1974) | National Capital Territory of Delhi | 20 February 2025 | Incumbent | 1 year, 192 days | Bharatiya Janata Party |

== Statistics ==
=== List of female chief ministers by length of term ===
| No. | Name | Party | Length of term | |
| No. | Name | Party | Longest continuous term | Total duration of the chief ministership |
|---|---|---|---|---|
| 1 | Sheila Dikshit | INC | 15 years, 25 days | 15 years, 25 days |
| 2 | Mamata Banerjee | AITC | 14 years, 353 days | 14 years, 353 days |
| 3 | J. Jayalalithaa | AIADMK | 4 years, 323 days | 14 years, 124 days |
| 4 | Vasundhara Raje | BJP | 5 years, 4 days | 10 years, 7 days |
| 5 | Rabri Devi | RJD | 4 years, 360 days | 7 years, 190 days |
| 6 | Mayawati | BSP | 4 years, 307 days | 7 years, 5 days |
| 7 | Shashikala Kakodkar | MGP | 5 years, 258 days | 5 years, 258 days |
| 8 | Nandini Satpathy | INC | 4 years, 185 days | 4 years, 185 days |
| 9 | Sucheta Kripalani | INC | 3 years, 162 days | 3 years, 162 days |
| 10 | Anandiben Patel | BJP | 2 years, 77 days | 2 years, 77 days |
| 11 | Mehbooba Mufti | JKPDP | 2 years, 76 days | 2 years, 76 days |
| 12 | Rekha Gupta | BJP | 1 year, 192 days | 1 year, 192 days |
| 13 | Uma Bharti | BJP | 259 days | 259 days |
| 14 | Anwara Taimur | INC | 206 days | 206 days |
| 15 | Atishi | AAP | 152 days | 152 days |
| 16 | Rajinder Kaur Bhattal | INC | 83 days | 83 days |
| 17 | Sushma Swaraj | BJP | 52 days | 52 days |
| 18 | V. N. Janaki Ramachandran | AIADMK | 23 days | 23 days |

== See also ==
- List of female governors in India
- List of female chief justices in India
- List of current Indian chief ministers
- List of female opposition leaders in India
- List of female deputy chief ministers in India
- List of longest-serving Indian chief ministers
- List of female legislative speakers and chairpersons in India
- List of female lieutenant governors and administrators in India
