= Raj Khurana =

Indian politician

Personal details
- Born: 2 September 1956 Rajpura, Punjab, India
- Died: 25 December 2016 (aged 60) Gurugram, Haryana, India
- Party: Bharatiya Janata Party
- Spouse: Raj Kumari
- Children: Savita Khurana Tarun Khurana Malvika Khurana
- Parents: Sh.Piara Lal (father); Smt.Radha Devi (mother)
- Education: B.Com, S A Jain College, 1971

Raj Khurana (2 September 1956 – 25 December 2016) was an Indian politician and socialist from Punjab who was a Chief Parliamentary Secretary (Finance), Punjab. A member of the Bharatiya Janata Party, Khurana previously held the finance portfolios for Badal government and served as the Member of legislative assembly(india) for the constituency of Rajpura, Punjab. He had the privilege to serve Rajpura as an M.L.A for three tenures. He has been a chairman of many trusts and societies. He has both socially and economically been a representative of the Bhawalpur society.

== Education ==
Raj Khurana obtained his primary education from K.K Public School, Rajpura. He obtained his bachelor's degree from S.A. Jain College.

== Career ==
Following the footsteps of his father, Raj Khurana started his career as a commission agent in the grain market, Rajpura in 1971. Soon, things took a turn, and then he began dealing in a fertilizer business. In this business, he gained great prosperity and also received highest sale awards for an outstanding performance in trading.

== Political career ==
Raj Khurana contested his first election to the Punjab Vidhan Sabha in 1992 from Rajpura as a candidate of the Indian National Congress. In 1997, he lost to Balram Das Tandon of the BJP, but defeated Tandon in 2002. In 2006, following differences with the Congress leadership, he joined the BJP and was granted the party ticket in 2007, which he won. In 2012, he lost the election to Hardial Singh Kamboj of the Indian National Congress.

== Controversy ==
Raj Khurana was arrested by the Central Bureau of Investigation in May 2011, following which he resigned.
