= S.R. Lakha =

Indian civil servant

S. R. Lakha, IAS (Retd), is the former Vice Chancellor of Gautam Buddha University.

== Career ==
His appointment as Chairman of the Uttar Pradesh Public Service Commission was challenged in the High Court, which filed a public interest litigation (PIL). His appointment led the Mayawati government to face criticism for favoring Dalits for high-profile positions.

== Controversy ==
Bahujan Samaj Party founder Kanshi Ram accused S. R. Lakha and his brother of corruption. Deceased Member of Parliament Satnam Singh Kainth demanded a CBI inquiry into the charges.
