= List of female deputy chief ministers in India =

Female Deputy Chief Ministers of the Republic of India

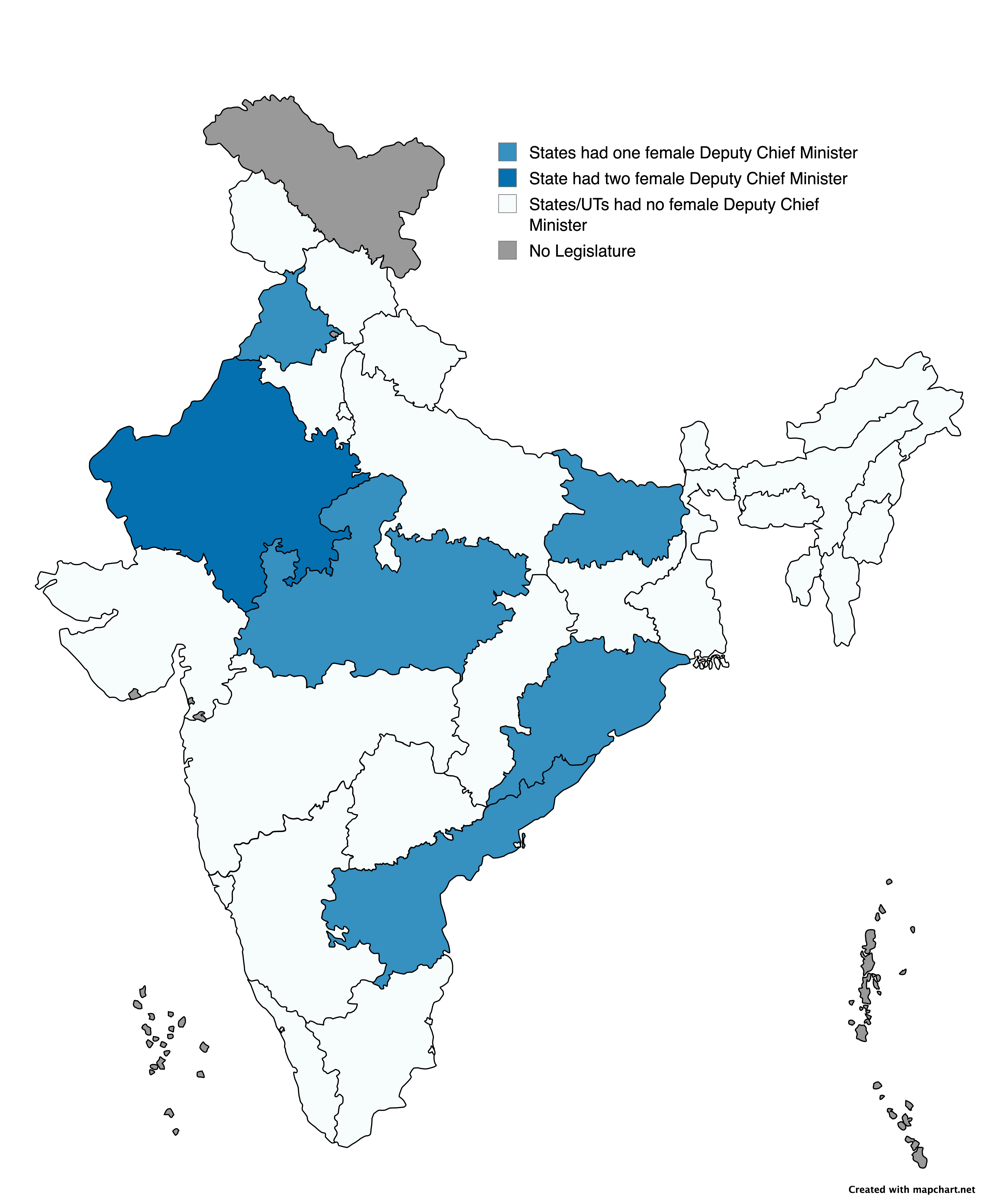
Map representing the number of female deputy chief ministers in different states and union territories of India

The deputy chief minister is the deputy to the chief minister, who is the chief executive of the Indian state. The governor appoints the deputy chief minister, who is the second-highest-ranking member in the council of ministers of the respective state. A deputy chief minister also holds a cabinet portfolio in the state ministry. In the legislative assembly system of government, the deputy chief minister is treated as the "first among equals" in the cabinet; the position of deputy chief minister is used to govern the state with the support of a single party member, to bring political stability and strength within a coalition government, or in times of state emergency when a proper chain of command is necessary. On multiple occasions, proposals have arisen to make the post permanent, but without result. The same goes for the post of deputy prime minister at the national level. Given that she has the confidence of the assembly, the chief minister's term is for five years and is subject to no term limits.

Since 1996, India has had nine female deputy chief ministers. The first woman to become deputy chief minister was Rajinder Kaur Bhattal of the Indian National Congress party, who was sworn in on 6 August 1996 as deputy chief minister of Punjab. She is also the only female deputy chief minister who served two non-consecutive terms and also as Chief Minister (who also only female chief minister who later served as deputy chief minister). Jamuna Devi was the longest-serving female deputy chief minister. Pamula Pushpa Sreevani of the Yuvajana Sramika Rythu Congress Party is the youngest and first member of the state party to become the female deputy chief minister. Only eight states in India had female deputy chief ministers out of 28 states and three union territories that have legislature systems.

Diya Kumari of Rajasthan, Pravati Parida of Odisha, Sunetra Pawar of Maharashtra, and Nemcha Kipgen of Manipur are the female incumbent deputy chief ministers in India.

== Chronological list ==
Key

- * Incumbent Chief Minister
- ^{†} Assassinated or died in office
- ^{RES} Resigned
- ^{NC} Resigned following a no-confidence motion

BJP (4) INC (3) NCP (1) YSRCP (1)
No.	Portrait	Name (Birth–Death)	Term of office			State/Union territory	Political party (Note: This column only names the deputy chief minister's party. The state government she heads with chief minister may be a complex coalition of several parties and independents; these are not listed here.)	Chief Minister
No.	Portrait	Name (Birth–Death)	Assumed office	Left office	Time in office	State/Union territory	Political party	Chief Minister
1		Rajinder Kaur Bhattal (1945–)	6 August 1996	21 November 1996	3 years, 161 days	Punjab	Indian National Congress	Harcharan Singh Brar
1		Rajinder Kaur Bhattal (1945–)	6 January 2004	1 March 2007	3 years, 161 days	Punjab	Indian National Congress	Amarinder Singh
2		Jamuna Devi (1929–2010)	1 December 1998	8 December 2003	5 years, 7 days	Madhya Pradesh	Indian National Congress	Digvijaya Singh
3		Kamla Beniwal (1927–2024)	25 January 2003	8 December 2003	317 days	Rajasthan	Indian National Congress	Ashok Gehlot
4		Pamula Pushpa Sreevani (b. 1986)	8 June 2019	7 April 2022	2 years, 303 days	Andhra Pradesh	Yuvajana Sramika Rythu Congress Party	Y. S. Jagan Mohan Reddy
5		Renu Devi (b. 1958)	16 November 2020	9 August 2022	1 year, 266 days	Bihar	Bharatiya Janata Party	Nitish Kumar
6		Diya Kumari* (b. 1971)	15 December 2023	Incumbent	2 years, 308 days	Rajasthan	Bharatiya Janata Party	Bhajan Lal Sharma
7		Pravati Parida* (b. 1967)	12 June 2024	Incumbent	2 years, 129 days	Odisha	Bharatiya Janata Party	Mohan Charan Majhi
8		Sunetra Pawar* (b. 1963)	31 January 2026	Incumbent	261 days	Maharashtra	Nationalist Congress Party	Devendra Fadnavis
9		Nemcha Kipgen* (b. 1965)	4 February 2026	Incumbent	257 days	Manipur	Bharatiya Janata Party	Yumnam Khemchand Singh

== Statistics ==
=== List of female deputy chief ministers by length of term ===
No.	Name	Party	Length of term	
No.	Name	Party	Longest continuous term	Total years of deputy chief ministership
1	Jamuna Devi	INC	5 years, 7 days	5 years, 7 days
2	Rajinder Kaur Bhattal	INC	3 years, 54 days	3 years, 161 days
3	Pamula Pushpa Sreevani	YSRCP	2 years, 303 days	2 years, 303 days
4	Diya Kumari	BJP	2 years, 308 days	2 years, 308 days
5	Pravati Parida	BJP	2 years, 129 days	2 years, 129 days
6	Renu Devi	BJP	1 year, 266 days	1 year, 266 days
7	Kamla Beniwal	INC	317 days	317 days
8	Sunetra Pawar	NCP	261 days	261 days
9	Nemcha Kipgen	BJP	257 days	257 days

== See also ==
- List of female governors in India
- List of female lieutenant governors and administrators in India
- List of female chief ministers in India
- List of female legislative speakers and chairpersons in India
- List of female opposition leaders in India
- List of female chief justices in India
- List of current Indian deputy chief ministers
