= List of female lieutenant governors and administrators in India =

Indian female lieutenant governors and administrators

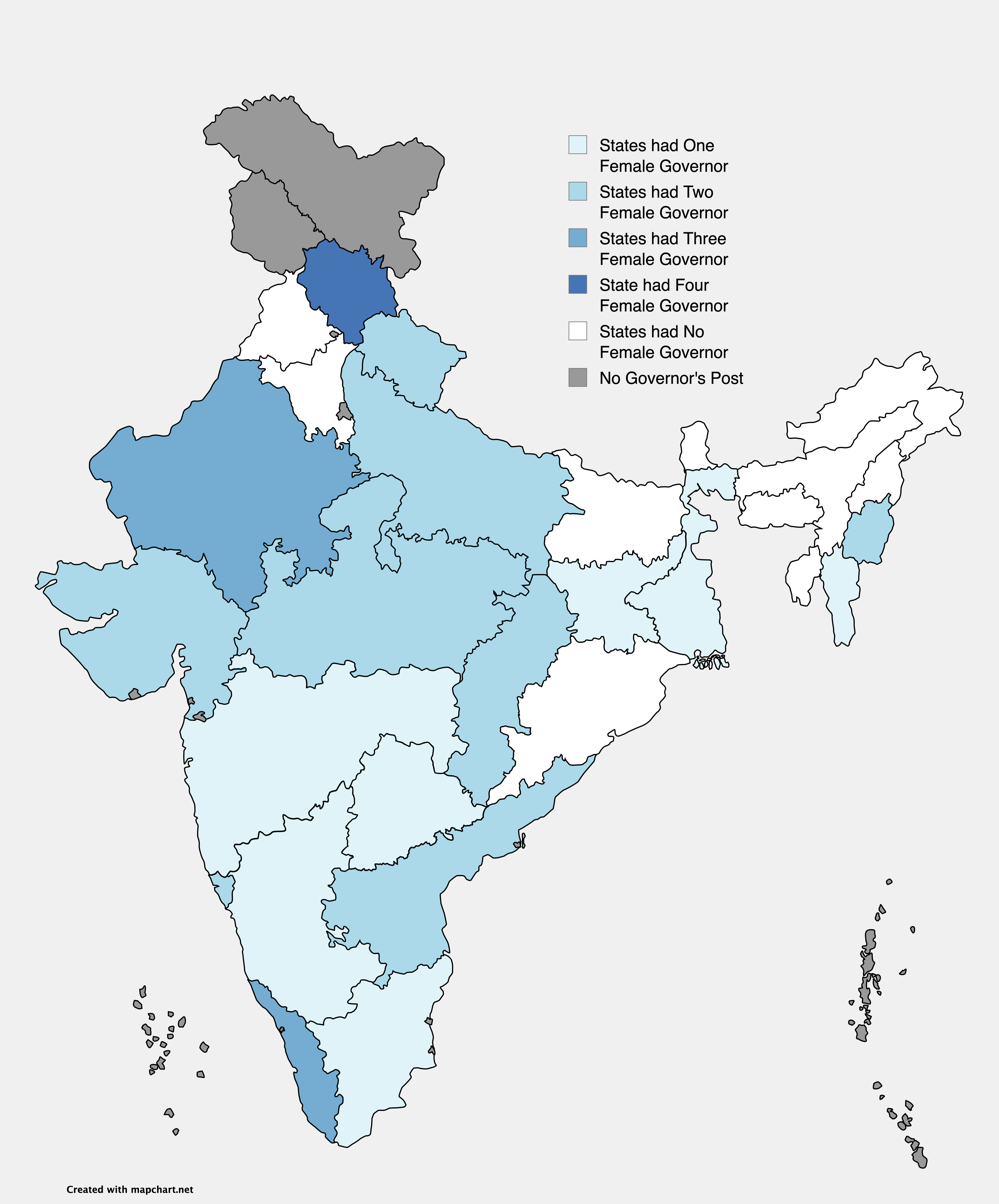
Map showing the number of the female Governors, Lieutenant Governors and Administrators served in Indian States and Union Territories

In the Republic of India, a lieutenant governor is the constitutional head of five of the eight union territories. The lieutenant governor is appointed by the President of India for a term of five years, and holds office at the President's pleasure. Since the union territories of Delhi, Jammu and Kashmir and Puducherry have a measure of self-government with an elected legislature and council of ministers, the role of the lieutenant governor there is mostly a ceremonial one, akin to that of a state's governor. In Andaman and Nicobar Islands and Ladakh however, the lieutenant governor holds more power, being both the head of state and head of government.

The other three union territories—Chandigarh; Dadra and Nagar Haveli and Daman and Diu; and Lakshadweep—are governed by an administrator. Unlike the lieutenant governors of other territories, they are usually drawn from the Indian Administrative Service (IAS) or Indian Police Service (IPS). Since 1985 the Governor of Punjab has also been the ex-officio Administrator of Chandigarh.

Chandrawati was the first woman to become the lieutenant governor of an Indian union territory, Kiran Bedi is the longest-serving female lieutenant governor with almost 5 years tenure. Tamilisai Soundararajan is the only woman to serve both as a lieutenant governor and governor.

As of 29 June 2024, no woman has served as the administrator of the three union territories. Till date all of the female lieutenant governors have been appointed only to Puducherry. Delhi, Andamans & Nicobar Islands, Lakshadweep, Jammu and Kashmir, Chandigarh, Ladakh doesn't have woman governor.

== Chronological list ==
Key

* Incumbent lieutenant governor

No.	Portrait	Name (Birth–Death)	Home state	Term of office			Union territory	Appointed by	Ref.
No.	Portrait	Name (Birth–Death)	Home state	Assumed office	Left office	Time in office	Union territory	Appointed by	Ref.
1		Chandrawati (1928–2020)	Haryana	19 February 1990	18 December 1990	302 days	Puducherry	R. Venkataraman	
2		Rajendra Kumari Bajpai (1925–1999)	Bihar	2 May 1995	22 April 1998	2 years, 355 days	Puducherry	Shanker Dayal Sharma	
3		Rajani Rai (1931–2013)	Maharashtra	23 April 1998	29 July 2002	4 years, 97 days	Puducherry	K. R. Narayanan	
4		Kiran Bedi (b. 1949)	Punjab	29 May 2016	16 February 2021	4 years, 263 days	Puducherry	Pranab Mukherjee	
5		Tamilisai Soundararajan (b. 1961)	Tamil Nadu	16 February 2021	18 March 2024	3 years, 31 days	Puducherry	Ram Nath Kovind	

== See also ==
- List of female governors in India
- List of female chief ministers in India
- List of female deputy chief ministers in India
- List of female legislative speakers and chairpersons in India
- List of female opposition leaders in India
- List of female chief justices in India
- List of current Indian lieutenant governors and administrators
