= Satnam Singh Kainth =

Indian politician (1961–2018)

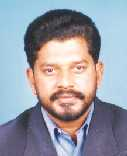

Member of Parliament, Lok Sabha
- In office 10 March 1998 — 26 April 1999
- Preceded by: Harbhajan Lakha
- Succeeded by: Santosh Chowdhary
- Constituency: Phillaur Punjab

Leader of Opposition in Punjab Assembly
- In office 25 February 1992 - 12 February 1997
- Preceded by: Gurbinder Kaur Brar
- Succeeded by: Rajinder Kaur Bhattal

Personal details
- Born: 21 April 1961 Village Sotran, Tehsil Banga, District Shahid Bhagat Singh Nagar Punjab
- Died: 14 January 2018 (aged 56) Mohali, Punjab.
- Party: Bahujan Samaj Party (till 1998); Bahujan Samaj Morcha (1998-2007) Indian National Congress (from 2007- till death )
- Children: 2

Satnam Singh Kainth, was an Indian politician and founder of BSP (Kainth).

== Early life ==
He was born into Chamar caste to Chanan Ram at Sotran, Nawanshahr (Punjab). He did B.A. from Guru Nanak Dev University, Amritsar.

== Politics ==
He became MLA from Banga Assembly Constituency of Bahujan Samaj Party as well as the Leader of Opposition from 1992-97.

He formed his own faction of Bahujan Samaj Party in Punjab.

In 1998, he became Member of Parliament from Phillaur constituency in Punjab and served till mid 1999.

He again contested the Punjab Assembly elections from Adampur constituency in 2012 and in 2017 from Banga constituency but lost subsequently.

He was Vice-President of Punjab Pradesh Congress Committee and later died of brain hemorrhage on 14 January 2018.

== See also ==
- Ravidassia
- Kanshi Ram
- Mayawati
- Bahujan Samaj Party
