= Chaudhary Sadhu Ram =

Indian politician

Member of Parliament, Lok Sabha
- In office 1957-1977
- Succeeded by: Bhagat Ram
- Constituency: Phillaur, Punjab

Personal details
- Born: January 1909 Domeli, Kapurthala, Punjab, British India
- Died: August 1975 (aged 66) Phillaur, Punjab
- Party: Indian National Congress
- Spouse: Rao Kaur
- Children: 6

Chaudhary Sadhu Ram (January 1909 – August 1975) was an Indian politician and five-time Member of Parliament.

== Early life ==
Chaudhary Sadhu Ram was born in 1909 in Domeli, a village in the Kapurthala district of Punjab, into a Chamar family. His father's name was Jawahar Mal, and he received his early education at Khalsa High School in Domeli. Before entering politics,

He worked in the leather trade in Jalandhar and became one of the wealthiest members of the Chamar community in the Doaba region.

== Movement ==
In late 1920s he joined Ad-Dharm movement founded by Mangu Ram Mugowalia. He became an active member of the movement but due to rifts among the leaders he led a separate faction, "All Indian Ad Dharm Mandal", headquartering at Lyallpur, Punjab.

He became a close aid of Dr. B.R. Ambedkar and joined Scheduled Castes Federation and became its president of state unit in 1942.

== Politics ==
In 1946, he joined Indian National Congress and in 1954 became convenor of Depressed Classes League for PEPSU state.

In 1952, he fought his first election from Phagwara constituency of PEPSU Legislative Assembly and became Deputy Minister for Home Affairs.

In 1957 India general elections he won Jullundar Lok Sabha constituency and in 3rd, 4th and 5th Lok Sabha elections from Phillaur constituency of Punjab.
