= Ajay Gupta =

Indian politician

MLA, Punjab Legislative Assembly
- Incumbent
- Assumed office 2022
- Constituency: Amritsar Central
- Majority: Aam Aadmi Party

Personal details
- Party: Aam Aadmi Party

Ajay Gupta is an Indian politician and the MLA representing the Amritsar Central Assembly constituency in the Punjab Legislative Assembly. He is a member of the Aam Aadmi Party. He was elected as the MLA in the 2022 Punjab Legislative Assembly election.

== Member of Legislative Assembly ==
He represents the Amritsar Central Assembly constituency as MLA in Punjab Assembly. The Aam Aadmi Party gained a strong 79% majority in the sixteenth Punjab Legislative Assembly by winning 92 out of 117 seats in the 2022 Punjab Legislative Assembly election. MP Bhagwant Mann was sworn in as Chief Minister on 16 March 2022.

Committee assignments of Punjab Legislative Assembly

- Member (2022–23) Committee on Public Accounts
- Member (2022–23) House Committee

== Assets and liabilities declared during elections ==
During the 2022 Punjab Legislative Assembly election, she declared Rs. 18,35,02,217 as an overall financial asset and Rs. 4,00,01,071 as financial liability.

== Electoral performance ==
Punjab Assembly election, 2022: Amritsar Central
Party	Candidate	Votes	%	±%
AAP	Ajay Gupta	40,837	46.83	
INC	Om Parkash Soni	26,811	30.74	
BJP	Ram Chawla	13,551	15.54	
BSP	Dalvir Kaur	4,016	4.61	
NOTA	None of the above	697	0.76	
Majority		14,026	16.09	
Turnout		87,205		
Registered electors		147,058		
AAP gain from INC		Swing		

State Legislative Assembly
Preceded by -	Member of the Punjab Legislative Assembly from Amritsar Central Assembly constituency 2022 –	Incumbent
