= List of female chief justices in India =

This is a list of women who have served as chief justices of the high courts of India, arranged in chronological order.

The first woman to be appointed as the chief justice of an Indian high court was Leila Seth, who assumed office at the Himachal Pradesh High Court on 5 August 1991. The Kerala High Court and the Madras High Court have each had the highest number of female chief justices, with three appointments each.

Manjula Chellur served as the chief justice of three different high courts and holds the record for the longest combined tenure among female chief justices, exceeding five years. In contrast, Sonia Gokani had the shortest tenure, serving for just nine days.

Till 12 July 2026, there have been 21 women chief justices across 15 high courts. At present, three women serve as chief justices among the 25 high courts chief justices in India.

== List of female chief justices ==
Key

Incumbent

| No. | Portrait | Name | Date of appointment | Date of retirement | Tenure | High Court | Note |
|---|---|---|---|---|---|---|---|
| 1 | | Leila Seth | 5 August 1991 | 20 October 1992 | 1 year, 76 days | Himachal Pradesh High Court | First female chief justice of a high court in India. |
| 2 | | Kanta Kumari Bhatnagar | 15 June 1992 | 14 November 1992 | 152 days | Madras High Court | First female chief justice of Madras High Court. |
| 3 | | Sujata Manohar | 15 January 1994 | 20 April 1994 | 95 days | Bombay High Court | First female chief justice of the High Courts of Bombay and Kerala. Later elevated to Supreme Court of India. |
| 3 | | Sujata Manohar | 21 April 1994 | 7 November 1994 | 200 days | Kerala High Court | First female chief justice of the High Courts of Bombay and Kerala. Later elevated to Supreme Court of India. |
| 4 | | K. K. Usha | 25 February 2001 | 3 July 2001 | 128 days | Kerala High Court | |
| 5 | | Gyan Sudha Misra | 13 July 2008 | 30 April 2010 | 1 year, 291 days | Jharkhand High Court | First female chief justice of Jharkhand High Court. Later elevated to Supreme Court of India. |
| 6 | | Rekha Doshit | 21 June 2010 | 12 December 2014 | 4 years, 174 days | Patna High Court | First female chief justice of Patna High Court. |
| 7 | | Manjula Chellur | 26 September 2012 | 1 August 2014 | 1 year, 310 days | Kerala High Court | First female chief justice of Calcutta High Court. |
| 7 | | Manjula Chellur | 6 August 2014 | 21 August 2016 | 2 years, 15 days | Calcutta High Court | First female chief justice of Calcutta High Court. |
| 7 | | Manjula Chellur | 22 August 2016 | 4 December 2017 | 1 year, 104 days | Bombay High Court | First female chief justice of Calcutta High Court. |
| 8 | | T. Meena Kumari | 23 March 2013 | 3 August 2013 | 133 days | Meghalaya High Court | First chief justice of Meghalaya High Court. |
| 9 | | R. Banumathi | 16 November 2013 | 12 August 2014 | 269 days | Jharkhand High Court | Later elevated to Supreme Court of India. |
| 10 | | Gorla Rohini | 21 April 2014 | 13 April 2017 | 2 years, 357 days | Delhi High Court | First female chief justice of Delhi High Court. |
| 11 | | Indira Banerjee | 5 April 2017 | 6 August 2018 | 1 year, 123 days | Madras High Court | Later elevated to Supreme Court of India. |
| 12 | | Abhilasha Kumari | 9 February 2018 | 22 February 2018 | 13 days | Manipur High Court | First female chief justice of Manipur High Court. |
| 13 | | Gita Mittal | 11 August 2018 | 8 December 2020 | 2 years, 119 days | Jammu & Kashmir and Ladakh High Court | First female chief justice of Jammu & Kashmir and Ladakh High Court. |
| 14 | | Vijaya Tahilramani | 12 August 2018 | 6 September 2019 | 1 year, 25 days | Madras High Court | |
| 15 | | Hima Kohli | 7 January 2021 | 30 August 2021 | 235 days | Telangana High Court | First female chief justice of Telangana High Court. Later elevated to Supreme Court of India. |
| 16 | | Sonia Gokani | 16 February 2023 | 25 February 2023 | 9 days | Gujarat High Court | First female chief justice of Gujarat High Court. |
| 17 | | Sunita Agarwal | 23 July 2023 | 5 October 2026 | 3 years, 74 days | Gujarat High Court | |
| 18 | | Ritu Bahri | 4 February 2024 | 10 October 2024 | 249 days | Uttarakhand High Court | First female chief justice of Uttarakhand High Court. |
| 19 | | Revati Prashant Mohite Dere | 10 January 2026 | Incumbent | 283 days | Meghalaya High Court | |
| 20 | | Lisa Gill | 25 April 2026 | Incumbent | 178 days | Andhra Pradesh | First Female Chief Justice of Andhra Pradesh High Court. |
| 21 | | Meenakshi Madan Rai | 5 June 2026 | 11 July 2026 | 36 days | Patna High Court | |

== See also ==
- List of female governors in India
- List of female lieutenant governors and administrators in India
- List of female chief ministers in India
- List of female deputy chief ministers in India
- List of female legislative speakers and chairpersons in India
- List of female opposition leaders in India
- List of current Indian chief justices
- List of chief justices of India
- List of sitting judges of the Supreme Court of India
- List of former judges of the Supreme Court of India
- List of female judges of the Supreme Court of India
- List of sitting judges of the high courts of India
- List of first women lawyers and judges in Asia
