= Sucheta Kripalani =

4th Chief Minister of Uttar Pradesh

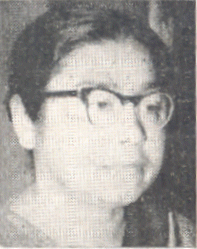
- Kriplani in 1960

4th Chief Minister of Uttar Pradesh
- In office 2 October 1963 – 13 March 1967
- Preceded by: Chandra Bhanu Gupta
- Succeeded by: Chandra Bhanu Gupta

Member of Uttar Pradesh Legislative Council
- In office 4 May 1961 – 1962

Minister of Labour, Community Development and Industry, Uttar Pradesh
- In office December 1960 – October 1963
- Chief Minister: Chandra Bhanu Gupta

Member of Uttar Pradesh Legislative Assembly
- In office 1962–1967
- Constituency: Menhdawal

Member of Parliament, Lok Sabha
- In office 1967–1971
- Preceded by: N. Dandekar
- Succeeded by: Anand Singh
- Constituency: Gonda, Uttar Pradesh
- In office 1952–1961
- Preceded by: Constituency established
- Succeeded by: Balraj Madhok
- Constituency: New Delhi, Delhi

Member of Provisional Parliament
- In office 1950–1952

Member of Constituent Assembly of India
- In office 9 December 1946 – 24 January 1950

Member of Uttar Pradesh Legislative Assembly
- In office 1948–1950

Personal details
- Born: 25 June 1908 Ambala, Punjab, British India (present-day Haryana, India)
- Died: 1 December 1974 (aged 66) New Delhi, India
- Party: Indian National Congress; Kisan Mazdoor Praja Party; Praja Socialist Party
- Spouse: J. B. Kripalani (m. 1938)
- Relations: Manmatha Nath Dutt (maternal grandfather)
- Education: St. Stephen's College, Delhi

Sucheta Kripalani (née Majumdar) (Bengali pronunciation: [ʃut͡ʃeta]; 25 June 1908 – 1 December 1974) was an Indian politician and independence activist. She was India's first female Chief Minister, serving as the head of the Uttar Pradesh government from 1963 to 1967.

== Early life ==
She was born in Ambala, Punjab (modern day Haryana) in a Bengali Brahmo Samaj family. Her father Surendranath Majumdar, worked as a medical officer, a job that entailed many transfers. As a result, she attended a number of schools, her final degree is a Master's in History from St. Stephen's College, Delhi.

This was a time when the country's atmosphere was charged with nationalist sentiments and the freedom struggle was gaining momentum.

She was a shy child, self-conscious about her appearance and intellect, as she points out in her book, Sucheta : An Unfinished Autobiography. It was the age she grew up in and the situations she faced that shaped her personality. Sucheta recounts how, as a 10-year-old, she and her siblings had heard their father and his friends talk about the Jallianwala Bagh massacre. It left them so outraged that they vented their anger on some of the Anglo-Indian children they played with, by calling them names.

She studied at Indraprastha College and Punjab University before becoming a professor of Constitutional History at Banaras Hindu University. In 1936, she married J. B. Kripalani, a prominent figure of the Indian National Congress, who was twenty years her senior. The marriage was opposed by both families, as well as by Gandhi himself, although he eventually relented.

== Freedom movement and independence ==
Like her contemporaries Aruna Asaf Ali and Usha Mehta, she participated in the Quit India Movement and was arrested by the British. She later worked closely with Mahatma Gandhi during the Partition riots. She accompanied him to Noakhali in 1946.

She was one of the few women who were elected to the Constituent Assembly of India and was part of the subcommittee that drafted the Indian Constitution. She became a part of the subcommittee that laid down the charter for the constitution of India. On 14 August 1947, she sang Vande Mataram in the Independence Session of the Constituent Assembly a few minutes before Nehru delivered his famous "Tryst with Destiny" speech. She was also the founder of the All India Mahila Congress, established in 1940.

== After independence ==
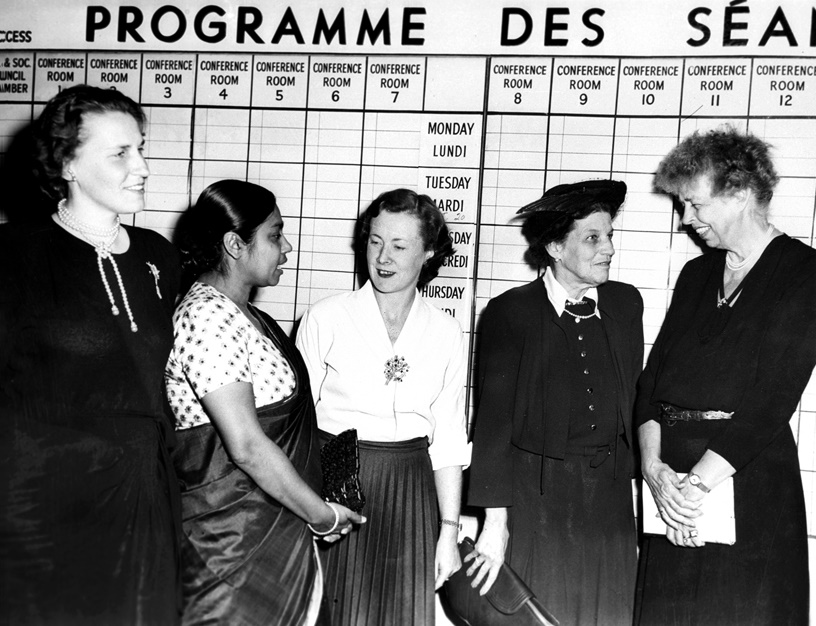
(From left to right) Ulla Lindström, Sucheta Kripalani, Barbara Castle, Cairine Wilson and Eleanor Roosevelt in 1949.

After independence, she remained involved with politics. For the first Lok Sabha elections in 1952, she contested from New Delhi on a KMPP ticket: she had joined the short-lived party founded by her husband the year before. She defeated the Congress candidate Manmohini Sahgal. Five years later, she was reelected from the same constituency, but this time as the Congress candidate. She was elected one last time to the Lok Sabha in 1967, from Gonda constituency in Uttar Pradesh.

Meanwhile, she had also become a member of the Uttar Pradesh Legislative Assembly. From 1960 to 1963, she served as Minister of Labour, Community Development and Industry in the UP government. In October 1963, she became the Chief Minister of Uttar Pradesh, the first woman to hold that position in any Indian state. The highlight of her tenure was the firm handling of a state employees strike. This first-ever strike by the state employees continued for 62 days. She relented only when the employees' leaders agreed to compromise. Kripalani kept her reputation as a firm administrator by refusing their demand for a pay hike. She was supported in administrative decisions and party organisation by the veteran leader Nirmal Chandra Chaturvedi, MLC.

When Congress split in 1969, she left the party with Morarji Desai faction to form NCO. She lost 1971 election as NCO candidate from Faizabad Lok Sabha constituency. She retired from politics in 1971 and remained in seclusion till her death in 1974.

== See also ==
- List of female chief ministers in India

Political offices
Preceded by Chandra Bhanu Gupta	Chief Minister of Uttar Pradesh; 2 October 1963 – 13 March 1967	Succeeded by Chandra Bhanu Gupta
