= Phillaur Lok Sabha constituency =

Former Lok Sabha Constituency in Punjab

Coordinates: 31.0°N 75.8°E

Phillaur
- Former Lok Sabha constituency

Constituency details
- Country: India
- Region: North India
- State: Punjab
- Established: 1962
- Abolished: 2008

Phillaur was a Lok Sabha constituency in Punjab. It was dissolved in 2008 and replaced by Anandpur Sahib Lok Sabha constituency.

== Members of Parliament ==
Most Successful parties from Phillaur Lok Sabha
1. INC (6 Times) (50.0%)
2. SAD (2 Times) (16.7%)
3. BSP (2 Times) (16.7%)
4. CPI (M) (1 Time) (8.33%)
5. IND (1 Time) (8.33%)

Election	Member	Party
1962	Chaudhary Sadhu Ram	Indian National Congress
1967	Chaudhary Sadhu Ram	Indian National Congress
1971	Chaudhary Sadhu Ram	Indian National Congress
1977	Bhagat Ram	Communist Party of India (Marxist)
1980	Chaudhary Sunder Singh	Indian National Congress
1984	Charanjit Singh Atwal	Shiromani Akali Dal
1989	Harbhajan Lakha	Bahujan Samaj Party
1992	Santosh Chowdhary	Indian National Congress
1996	Harbhajan Lakha	Bahujan Samaj Party
1998	Satnam Singh Kainth	Independent
1999	Santosh Chowdhary	Indian National Congress
2004	Charanjit Singh Atwal	Shiromani Akali Dal

- 2009 onwards: Anandpur Sahib

== See also ==
- Phillaur
- List of constituencies of the Lok Sabha
