= Bal Vidya Mandir, Lucknow =

Coordinates: 26.825791°N 80.931133°E

- Lucknow, Uttar Pradesh; India

Information
- Type: Residential/Day School
- Established: 1963
- Founder: Chandra Bhanu Gupta
- Principal: R. K. Pandey
- Campus: Urban
- Affiliations: CBSE
- Map: View in Google Maps
- Website: balvidyamandirlucknow.org

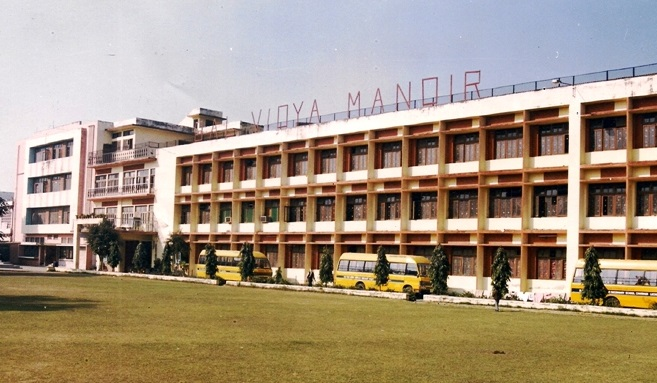
Bal Vidya Mandir, Lucknow

Bal Vidya Mandir (aka BVM) is an English medium, co-educational Senior Secondary Residential/Day School located in Lucknow, India. It was founded in 1963 by then Chief Minister of Uttar Pradesh, Chandra Bhanu Gupta, The school is fully affiliated to CBSE, imparts education from Nursery to Class XII (10+2). It is situated on the Motilal Nehru Marg opposite to Charbagh Railway Station, Station Road, Lucknow. The school celebrated its semicentennial in the year 2014. Now the school has launched new teachings schemes also. Most notably, the principal of this school has been accused of harassment of an employee and is an extremely rude and insufferable person who often punishes students, especially those with long hair, something he does not have and therefore, holds a lot of hate for those who do. This has created a lot of anger in students.

== History ==
The school was founded in 1963 by Chandra Bhanu Gupta, the then Chief Minister of Uttar Pradesh, under the auspices of the Motilal Memorial Society. The foundation stone of this school was laid by Shri Lal Bahadur Shastri, the then Prime Minister of India, on 19 November 1964.

== House system ==
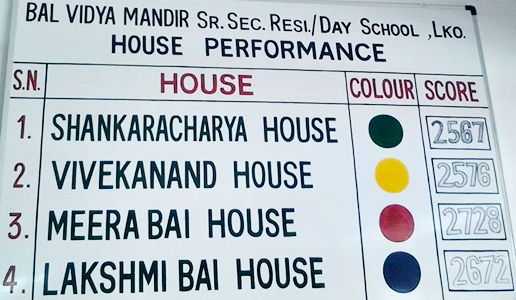
BVM House Performance Board

Each student is allocated to one house and the school is divided into four houses:

- Laxmibai House
- Meerabai House
- Shankaracharya House
- Vivekanand House

The school organizes various inter-house competitions throughout the year.

== Publications ==
The school's annual magazine, Bal Jyoti, includes articles written by students and coverage of the events throughout the academic session.
