= Harbhajan Lakha =

Indian politician

Member of Parliament, Lok Sabha
- In office 1989–1991
- Preceded by: Charanjit Singh Atwal
- Succeeded by: Santosh Chowdhary
- In office 1996–1998
- Preceded by: Santosh Chowdhary
- Succeeded by: Satnam Singh Kainth
- Constituency: Phillaur, Punjab

Personal details
- Born: c.1942
- Died: 11 June 2014
- Party: Bahujan Samaj Party

Harbhajan Lakha (c.1942 – 11 June 2014) was an Indian politician. He was elected to the Lok Sabha, the lower house of the Parliament of India from the Phillaur constituency of Punjab as a member of the Bahujan Samaj Party. He born in Ravidassia family and his brother S.R. Lakha is former Vice Chancellor of Gautam Buddha University

Lakha died in the Shaheed Bhagat Nagar district of Punjab on 11 June 2014, at the age of 72.
