= Bahujan Samaj Party (Kainth) =

Bahujan Samaj Party Kainth is a splinter group of Bahujan Samaj Party in Punjab. BSP(K) was founded on 30 October 2004. BSP(K) is led by Satnam Singh Kainth (ex: MP and ex-president of Democratic Bahujan Samaj Morcha). Kainth had re-joined BSP ahead of the 2004 Lok Sabha elections, but was later expelled.
