= Darbari Lal =

Indian politician

Ex Deputy speaker of the Punjab Legislative Assembly and Former Education Minister Government of Punjab, India
- In office 12 July 2004 – 10 March 2012

Personal details
- Party: Indian National Congress (2017-); Bharatiya Janata Party (2014-17); Indian National Congress (1980-2014)
- Children: 5
- Education: D.A.V College, Amritsar
- Occupation: Politician, professor

Prof. Darbari Lal is an Indian politician from the state of Punjab. He served as the Deputy Speaker of the Punjab Legislative Assembly from 12 July 2004 to 10 March 2007.

== Constituency ==
He represented the Amritsar central assembly constituency from 1980 to 1992 and 2002 to 2007.

== Political Party ==
He represented the Indian National Congress but in 2014 he joined the Bharatiya Janata Party.
