= Minster School =

The Minster School can refer to:

- Lincoln Minster School (independent) in Lincolnshire
- The Minster School, Southwell (state) in Nottinghamshire
- The Minster School, York (independent) in York
- Lytchett Minster School (state) in Dorset
- Earl Mortimer College (community) in Leominster, formerly called Minster School
