= Ministry =

Ministry may refer to:

== Government ==
- Ministry (collective executive), the complete body of government ministers under the leadership of a prime minister
- Ministry (government department), a department of a government

== Religion ==
- Christian ministry, activity by Christians to spread or express their faith
  - Minister (Christianity), clergy authorized by a church or religious organization to perform teaching or rituals
  - Ordination, the process by which individuals become clergy
- Ministry of Jesus, activities described in the Christian gospels
- Ministry (magazine), a magazine for pastors published by the Seventh-day Adventist Church

== Music ==
- Ministry (band), an American industrial metal band
- Ministry of Sound, a London nightclub and record label

== Fiction ==
- Ministry of Magic, governing body in the Harry Potter series
- Ministry of Darkness, a professional wrestling stable led by The Undertaker

== See also ==
- Minister (disambiguation)
- Department (disambiguation)
- Public Ministry (disambiguation)
