= Chandra Bhanu Gupta =

3rd Chief Minister of Uttar Pradesh, India

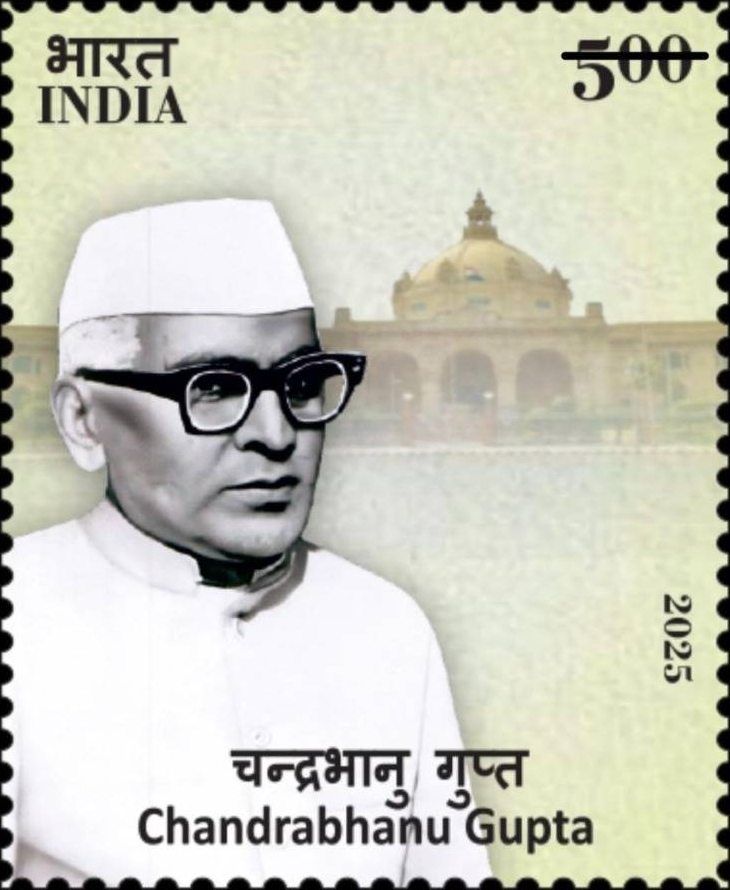
- Gupta on a 2025 stamp of India

3rd Chief Minister of Uttar Pradesh
- In office 26 February 1969 – 18 February 1970
- Preceded by: President's rule
- Succeeded by: Charan Singh
- In office 14 March 1967 – 3 April 1967
- Preceded by: Sucheta Kriplani
- Succeeded by: Charan Singh
- In office 7 December 1960 – 2 October 1963
- Preceded by: Sampurnanand
- Succeeded by: Sucheta Kriplani

Personal details
- Born: 14 July 1902 Atrauli, United Provinces of Agra and Oudh, British India
- Died: 11 March 1980 (aged 77) New Delhi, India
- Party: Indian National Congress
- Education: M.A., LL.B
- Alma mater: University of Lucknow

Chandra Bhanu Gupta (14 July 1902 – 11 March 1980) served three terms as chief minister of Indian state of Uttar Pradesh. In the 1970s, he was a member of Congress (O) and the Janata Party.

== Early life ==
He was born in Atrauli, Aligarh district in 1902. Gupta joined the Indian independence movement at 17, when he took part in anti-Rowlatt Bill demonstrations in Sitapur. Gupta completed his M.A. and LL.B from Lucknow University.

He was elected President of Congress Party for Lucknow in 1929.

== Social contribution ==
Gupta was the main force behind the Motilal Nehru Memorial Society, which set up various educational, social welfare, and cultural centres in Lucknow. These include Ravindralaya, Children Museum, Bal Vidya Mandir, Acharya Narendra Dev Hostel, Homeopathic Hospital, National P.G. College, a number of Degree Colleges, and a Public Library in Lucknow. Actively advised by Nirmal Chandra Chaturvedi, he introduced a number of schemes for the social, cultural, and educational development of the city.

== Electoral politics ==
Chandra Bhanu Gupta won UP assembly election from Lucknow City East in 1952, defeating his Jana Sangh rival.His Campaign Manager was his trusted and close colleague Pushkar Nath Bhatt,a leading lawyer & former Senior Vice Chairman of the Lucknow Municipal Board in the period before independence. However, in 1957, he lost from the same seat to Babu Triloki Singh of the Praja Socialist Party. In 1957, his Campaign Manager was Sharda Prasad Mukerjee, Principal of Vidyant Hindu Degree College. Later he became Chief Minister during that assembly's five-year run. He initially become an MLC and later shifted his constituency and shifted to Ranikhet in the Kumaon Hills. Prominent ministers in his cabinet included Hukum Singh, Ali Zaheer, Ram Murti, Girdhari Lal, Jugal Kishore, Vidyavati Rathore, KamlaPati Tripathi, Vichitra Narayan Sharma, Chaturbhuj Sharma and Kailash Prakash. In 1962, he had shifted to the Hills & became MLA from Ranikhet South seat. In the 1967 and 1969 elections, he was elected from Ranikhet assembly seat. In 1970, he supported Tribhuvan Narayan Singh's bid to become CM of Uttar Pradesh as a member of Congress (O), but the government did not last long.HN Bahuguna took a prominent role in dislodging him.

Chandra Bhanu Gupta's government in 1967 lasted only for 19 days as Charan Singh defected from Congress party with his 16 MLAs. Charan Singh was elected as leader of Samyukta Vidhayak Dal (SVD), the coalition of non-Congress parties. Charan Singh became the Chief Minister of Uttar Pradesh on 3 April 1967. On 24 July 1967, Gupta moved a no-confidence motion against the government, but the government survived.

Political offices
Preceded by Sampurnanand	Chief Minister of Uttar Pradesh; 7 December 1960 – 2 October 1963	Succeeded by Sucheta Kriplani
Preceded by Sucheta Kriplani	Chief Minister of Uttar Pradesh; 14 March 1967 – 3 April 1967	Succeeded by Charan Singh
Preceded by President's Rule; Administered by the Governor of Uttar Pradesh, Dr B G Reddy title/post previously held by- Charan Singh	Chief Minister of Uttar Pradesh; 26 February 1969 – 18 February 1970	Succeeded by Charan Singh
