= Mohinder Kaur Josh =

Indian politician

Chief Parliamentary Secretary
- In office 2012–2017
- Succeeded by: Pawan Adia
- Constituency: Sham Chaurasi Assembly Constituency

Member of the Punjab Legislative Assembly
- In office 1998–2002
- Preceded by: Arjun Singh Josh
- Succeeded by: Ram Lubhaya
- In office 2007–2017
- Preceded by: Ram Lubhaya
- Succeeded by: Pawan Adia

Personal details
- Party: Bharatiya Janata Party (June 2022 - )
- Other party: Shiromani Akali Dal
- Children: Karamjeet Singh Bablu Josh and Parminderjit kaur lovely
- Occupation: Politician

Mohinder Kaur Josh is an Indian politician from the state of Punjab. Daughter of Veteran politician S.Arjun Singh Josh.

== Constituency ==
Josh represents the Sham Chaurasi Assembly Constituency of Punjab and is a three term Member of the Punjab Legislative Assembly.

== Political Party ==
She joined Bharatiya Janata Party on 4 June 2022 along with Raj Kumar Verka, Gurpreet Singh Kangar, Sundar Sham Arora, and others at the party office in Chandigarh.

== Controversy ==
No controversy
