= Chaudhary Sunder Singh =

Indian politician

Member of Parliament, Lok Sabha
- In office 1980-1989
- Preceded by: Bhagat Ram
- Succeeded by: Harbhajan Lakha
- Constituency: Phillaur Punjab

Personal details
- Party: Indian National Congress

Chaudhary Sunder Singh is an Indian politician. He was elected to the Lok Sabha, the lower house of the Parliament of India from the Phillaur constituency of Punjab as a member of the Indian National Congress.

== Biography ==
He belonged to the Ravidassia community and was Minister of Welfare, Labour, Excise, and Taxation in 1953 in the Government of Punjab. He was an invincible leader in the Congress party who won all elections from 1946 to 1989.
