= Balram Das Tandon =

Indian politician

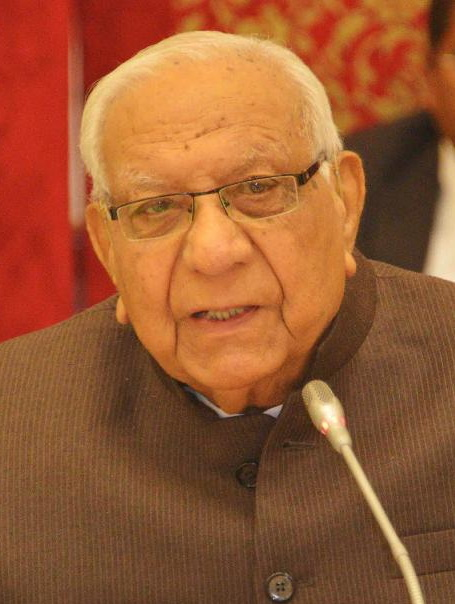

5th Governor of Chhattisgarh
- In office 25 July 2014 – 14 August 2018
- Chief Minister: Raman Singh
- Preceded by: Ram Naresh Yadav
- Succeeded by: Anandiben Patel

1st Deputy Chief Minister of Punjab
- In office 17 February 1969 – 26 March 1970
- Chief Minister: Gurnam Singh
- Preceded by: Office established
- Succeeded by: Rajinder Kaur Bhattal

Personal details
- Born: 1 November 1927 Amritsar, Punjab, British India
- Died: 14 August 2018 (aged 90) Raipur, Chhattisgarh, India
- Cause of death: Heart attack
- Party: Bharatiya Janata Party

Balram Das Tandon (1 November 1927 – 14 August 2018) was an Indian politician and the Former Governor of Chhattisgarh. In his adulthood for some years he was a pracharak of the Rashtriya Swayamsevak Sangh (RSS), and a leader of Bharatiya Janata Party from Punjab.

== Political career ==
He was deputy chief minister in the Justice (retd) Gurnam Singh Akali Dal-Jan Sangh ministry in 1969-70. He also served as cabinet minister in 1977-79 and in 1997–2002 in the ministries headed by Parkash Singh Badal. Tandon was a founding member of the Jan Sangh in 1951, and served as secretary of Punjab Jan Sangh from 1951 to 1957, and as president of the Punjab BJP from 1995 to 1997. He was elected to Punjab Legislative Assembly six times — five times from Amritsar in 1960,1962,1967,1969, and 1977, and once from Rajpura in 1997. He contested the Rajpura seat in 2002, but lost to Raj Khurana of the Indian National Congress. He was imprisoned in 1975 during the Emergency for 19 months. On 14 July 2014 he was named as the next Governor of Chhattisgarh.

== Family life ==
Tandon married Brijpal, who was also an activist in the freedom movement, in 1958. They had two daughters, Alka Kawatra and Poonam Batra, who reside in New Delhi, and one son, Sanjay Tandon, who is also part of the political framework for BJP, Chandigarh.

Political offices
Preceded by Ram Naresh Yadav	Governor of Chhattisgarh; 18 July 2014 – 14 August 2018	Succeeded by Anandiben Patel
