= Laxmi Kanta Chawla =

Indian politician

Laxmi Kanta Chawla is an Indian politician and a former cabinet minister in the Punjab Government. She is associated with the Bharatiya Janata Party (BJP) and has served as a member of the party's national leadership.

Chawla began her career as a college lecturer before entering politics. She was elected to the Punjab Legislative Assembly from Amritsar in 2007 and served as a Member of the Legislative Assembly (MLA) from 2007 to 2012.

During her tenure in the Punjab Government, she held the health portfolio and later served as Minister for Social Welfare in 2010. She has also served as National Vice President of the Bharatiya Janata Party.
