= Faridkot district =

- District of Punjab
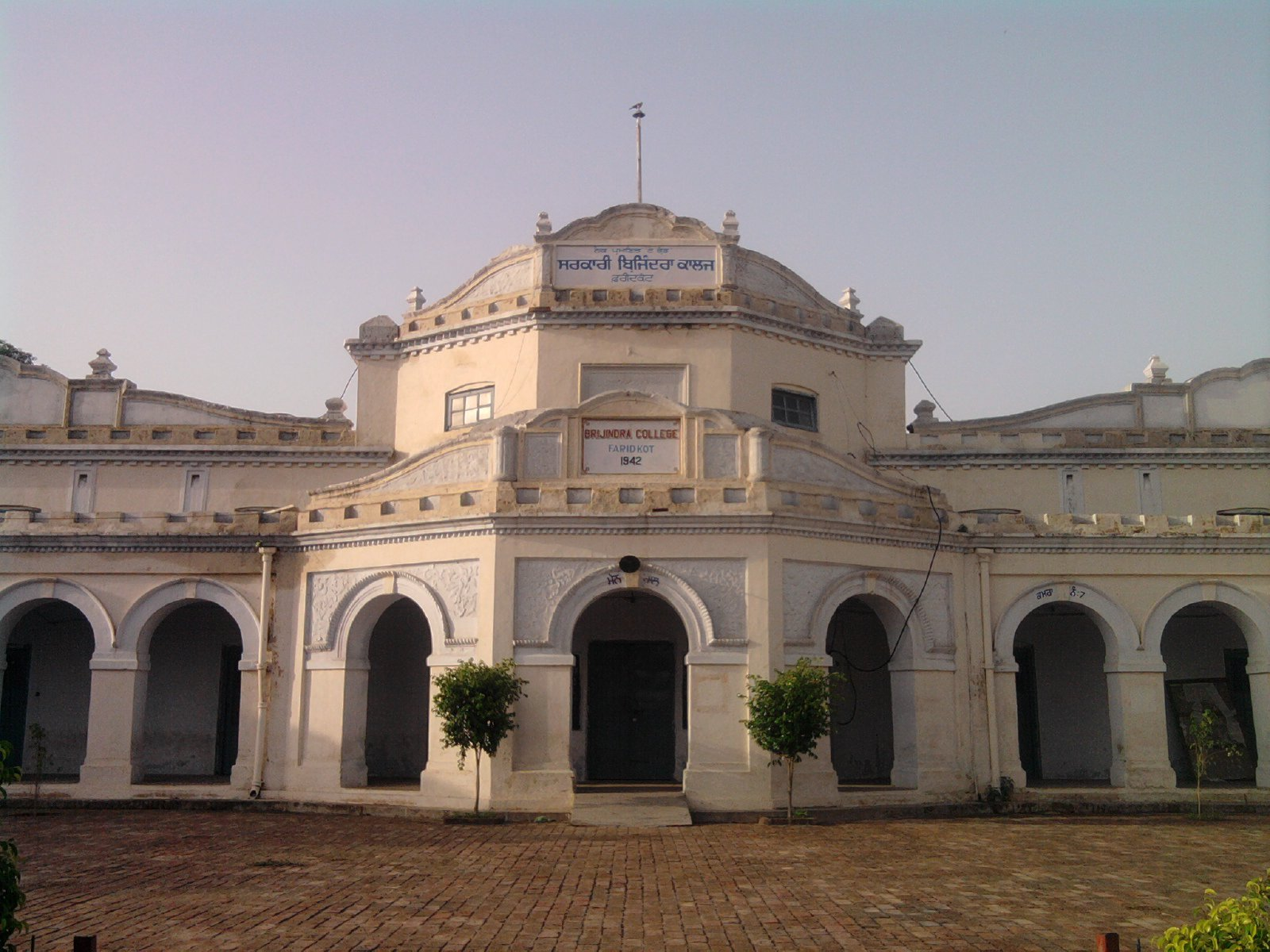
- Brijendra College in Faridkot

- Location in Punjab
- Country: India
- State: Punjab
- Headquarters: Faridkot
- Established: 13th century
- Founder: Raja Mokalsi
- Named for: Sheikh Fariduddin Ganjshakar

Government
  - Deputy Commissioner: Vineet Kumar, IAS

Area
  - Total: 1,458 km^{2} (563 sq mi)
- Elevation: 196 m (643 ft)

Population (2011)
  - Total: 617,508
  - Rank: 17
  - Density: 424/km^{2} (1,100/sq mi)
- Demonym(s): Faridkotian, Faridkotiya

Languages
  - Official: Punjabi
- Time zone: UTC+5:30 (IST)
- PIN: 151203
- Telephone code: +91-1639
- Sex ratio: 1000/890 ♂/♀
- Literacy: 69.60%
- Website: www.faridkot.nic.in

Faridkot district is a district lying in the South-Western part of Punjab, India with Faridkot city as the district headquarters. The district is part of the Faridkot division.

== Etymology ==
The district is named after its headquarters, Faridkot city, which in turn is named in the honor of Baba Farid, who was a Sufi saint and a Muslim missionary. The town of Faridkot was founded during the 13th century as Mokalhar by Raja Mokalsi, the grandson of Rai Munj, a Bhatti Chief of Bhatnair, Rajasthan. According to popular folklore, the Raja renamed Mokalhar to Faridkot after Baba Farid paid a visit to the town. It remained the capital during the reign of Mokalsi's son Jairsi and Wairsi.

== History ==
Historical population
Year	Pop.	±% p.a.
1951	182,145	—
1961	244,718	+3.00%
1971	293,475	+1.83%
1981	370,556	+2.36%
1991	455,005	+2.07%
2001	550,892	+1.93%
2011	617,508	+1.15%

The region was a self-governing princely state during the British Raj. Before independence, most of the area was ruled by the Sikh Maharaja of Faridkot, while the Jaito pargana, consisting of 16 villages, was part of Nabha State.

In 1947–48, both states acceded to the Dominion of India and became part of the PEPSU in 1948. Faridkot was made a tehsil of Bathinda district. In 1956, PEPSU was merged into Punjab.

Faridkot was carved out as a separate district on 7 August 1972, comprising Faridkot tehsil (from Bathinda district ) and Moga and Muktsar tehsils (from Ferozepur). In November 1995, the district was trifurcated: Moga and Nihal Singh Wala tehsils were formed into the new Moga district, while Muktsar tehsil was granted the status of a separate district.

== Location ==
Faridkot district is surrounded by district Ferozepur in the North-West, Muktsar in the South-West, Bathinda in the South, and Moga in the East.

The District covers an area of 1469 km^{2} which is 2.92% of the total area of the State and accommodates a population of 552,466, which is 2.27% of the total population of the State.

== Administration ==
It has three Subdivisions/ Tehsils namely Faridkot, Kotkapura and Jaito and a Sub Tehsil namely Sadiq comprising a total of 171 villages. Faridkot District has two development blocks namely Faridkot and Kotkapura.

In 2020, Faridkot has been made new police division. Earlier, Faridkot was part of Ferozepur police division. Moga and Mukatsar districts were also attached with Faridkot police division.

=== Subdistricts of Faridkot district ===
According to the Indian government's integrated online directory, Faridkot district is divided into the following subdistricts (tehsils/subdivisions) and blocks:

- Subdistricts
  1. Faridkot
  2. Jaitu
  3. Kotkapura
- Blocks:
  1. Faridkot
  2. Jaitu
  3. Kot Kapura

== Politics ==
No.	Constituency	Name of MLA	Party	Bench
87	Faridkot	Gurdit Singh Sekhon	Aam Aadmi Party	Government
88	Kotkapura	Kultar Singh Sandhwan	Aam Aadmi Party	Government
89	Jaitu (SC)	Amolak Singh	Aam Aadmi Party	Government

== Overview ==
The Faridkot district contains 2 Cities Faridkot, Kotkapura. More than 7 towns/villages are quite notable in the Faridkot area such as Jaitu, Bajakhana, Panjgarain Kalan, Deep Singh Wala, Golewala, Jhok Sarkari, Doad, Ghugiana, Sadiq, Chand Bhan, etc. Faridkot is a hub for premier educational institutions. North India's only Medical University i.e. Baba Farid University of Health Sciences is also named after Baba Farid besides Guru Gobind Singh Medical College, Engineering and Dental Colleges.

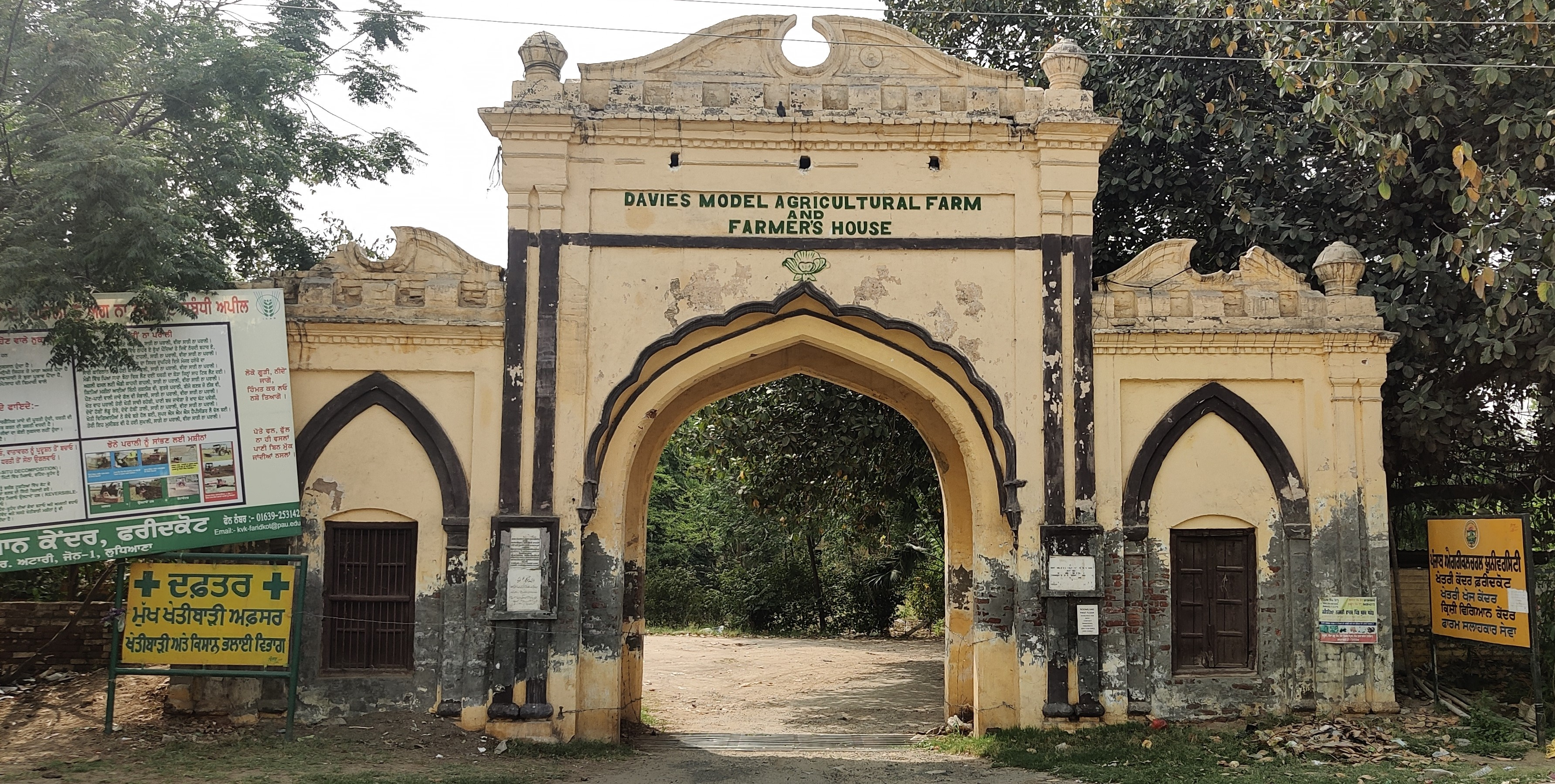
Entrance of Farmer's House Faridkot

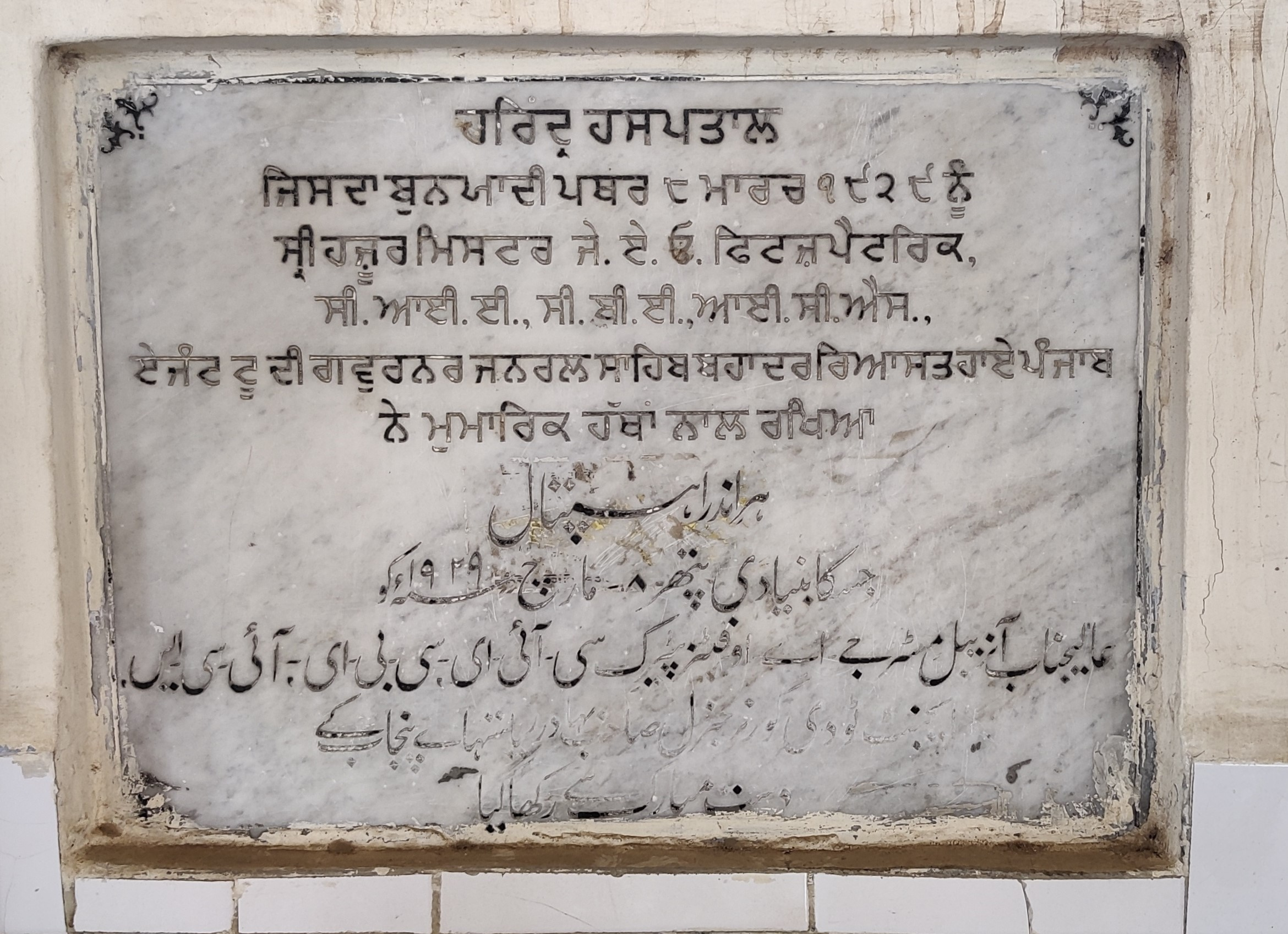
Foundation Stone of Harindra - Civil Hospital Faridkot

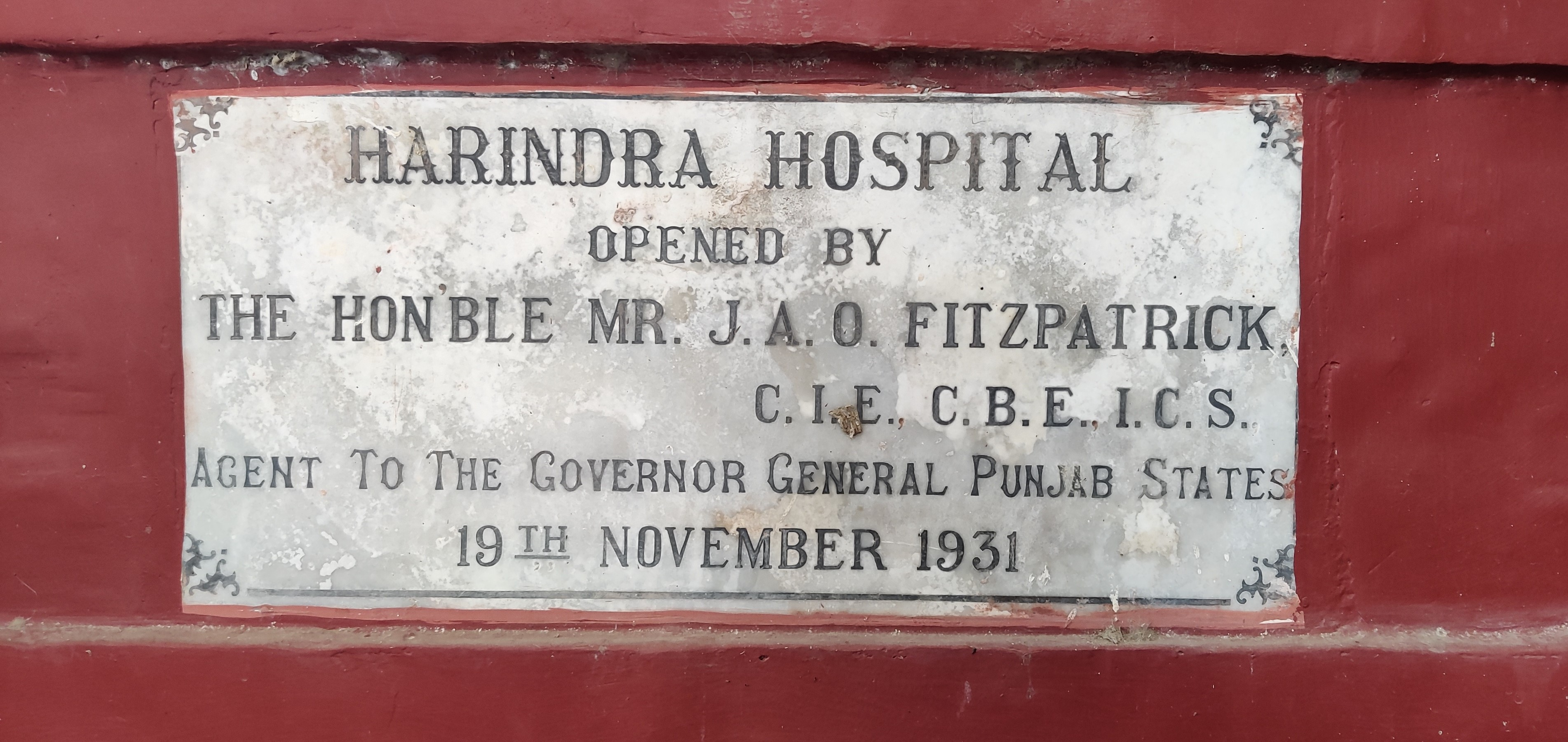
Foundation Stone of Harindra - Civil Hospital Faridkot

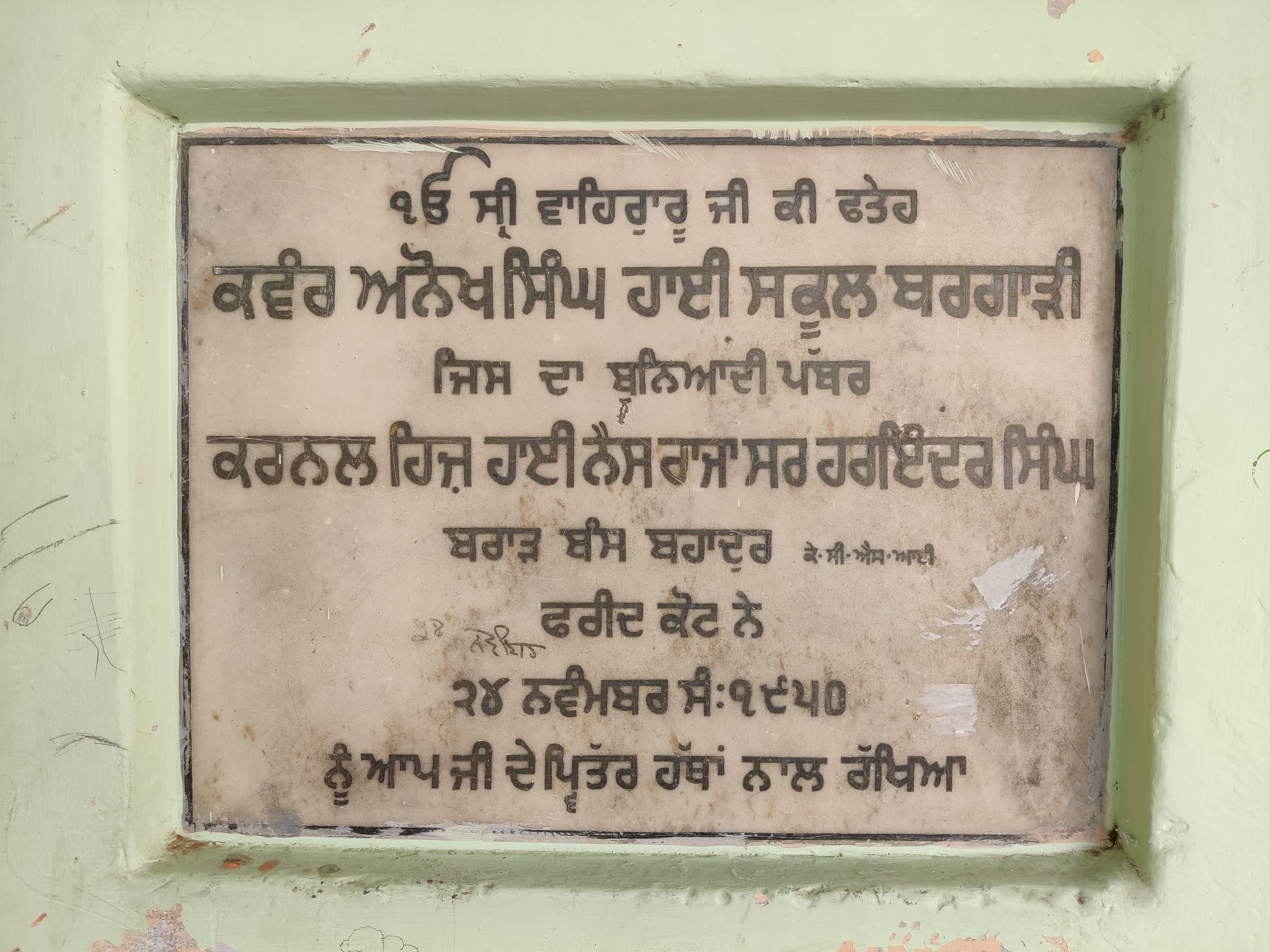
Foundation stone of Govt. School of Bargari (Faridkot)

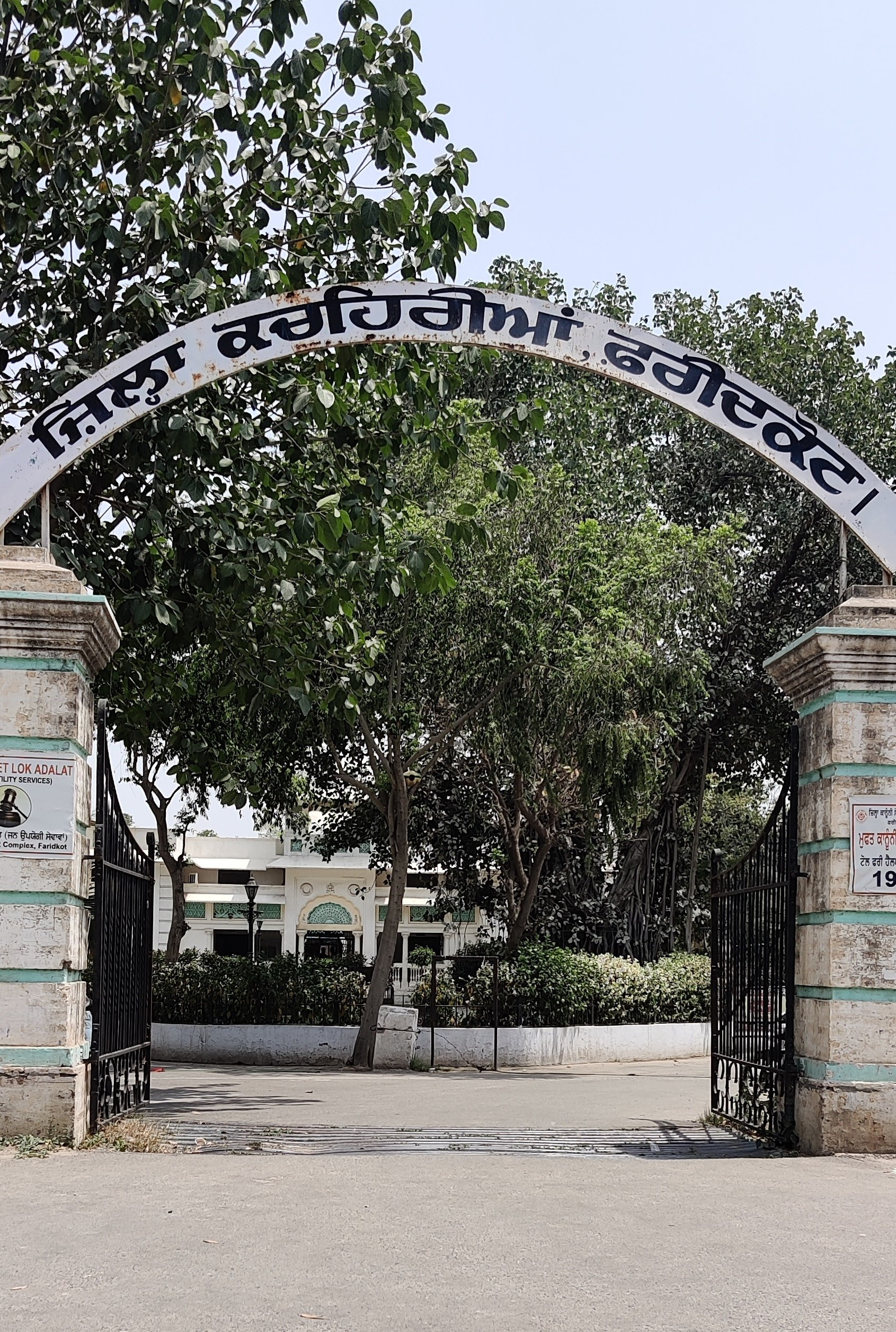
Entrance of District Court Faridkot

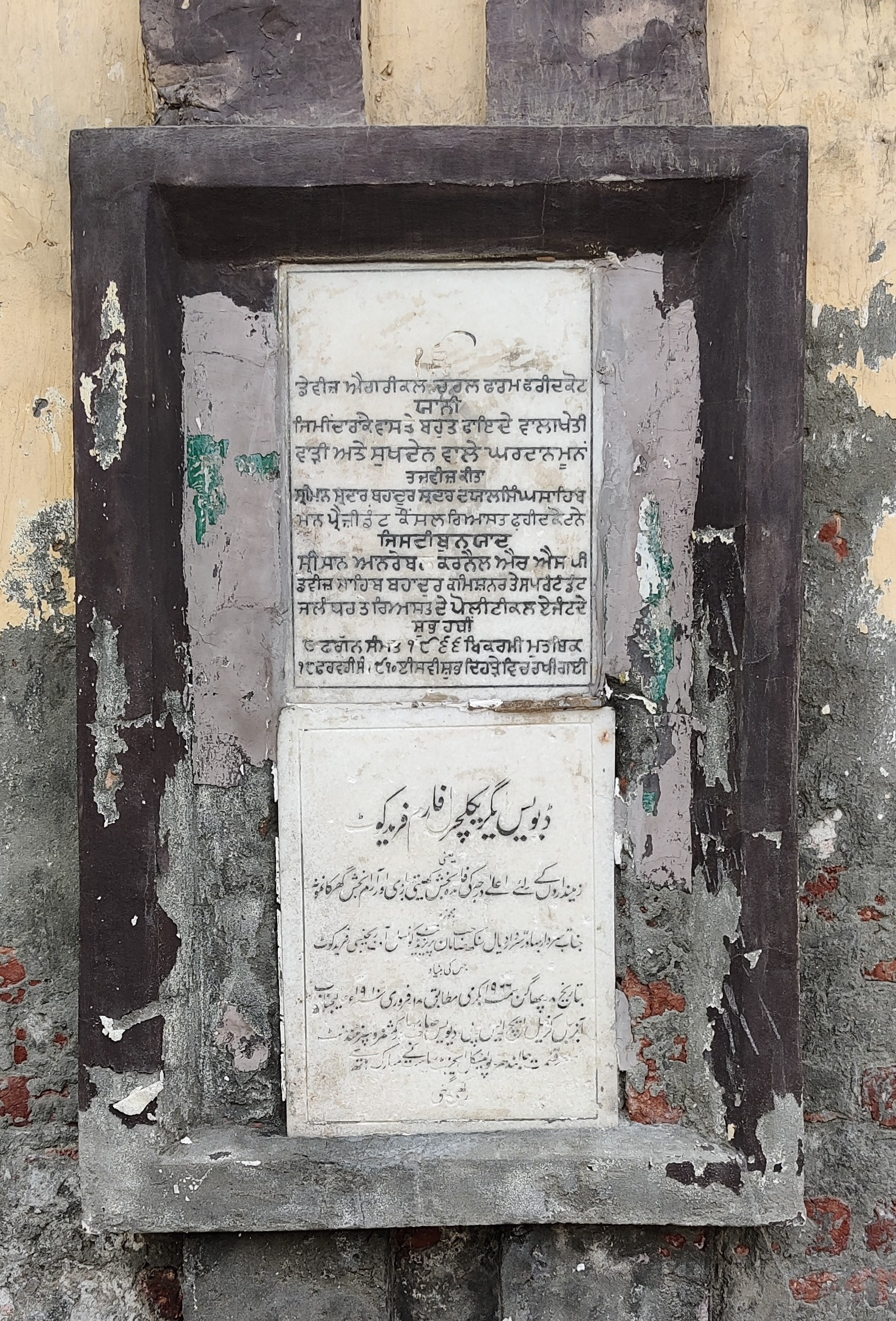
Foundation Stone of Davies Model Agricultural Farm and Farmers's House Faridkot

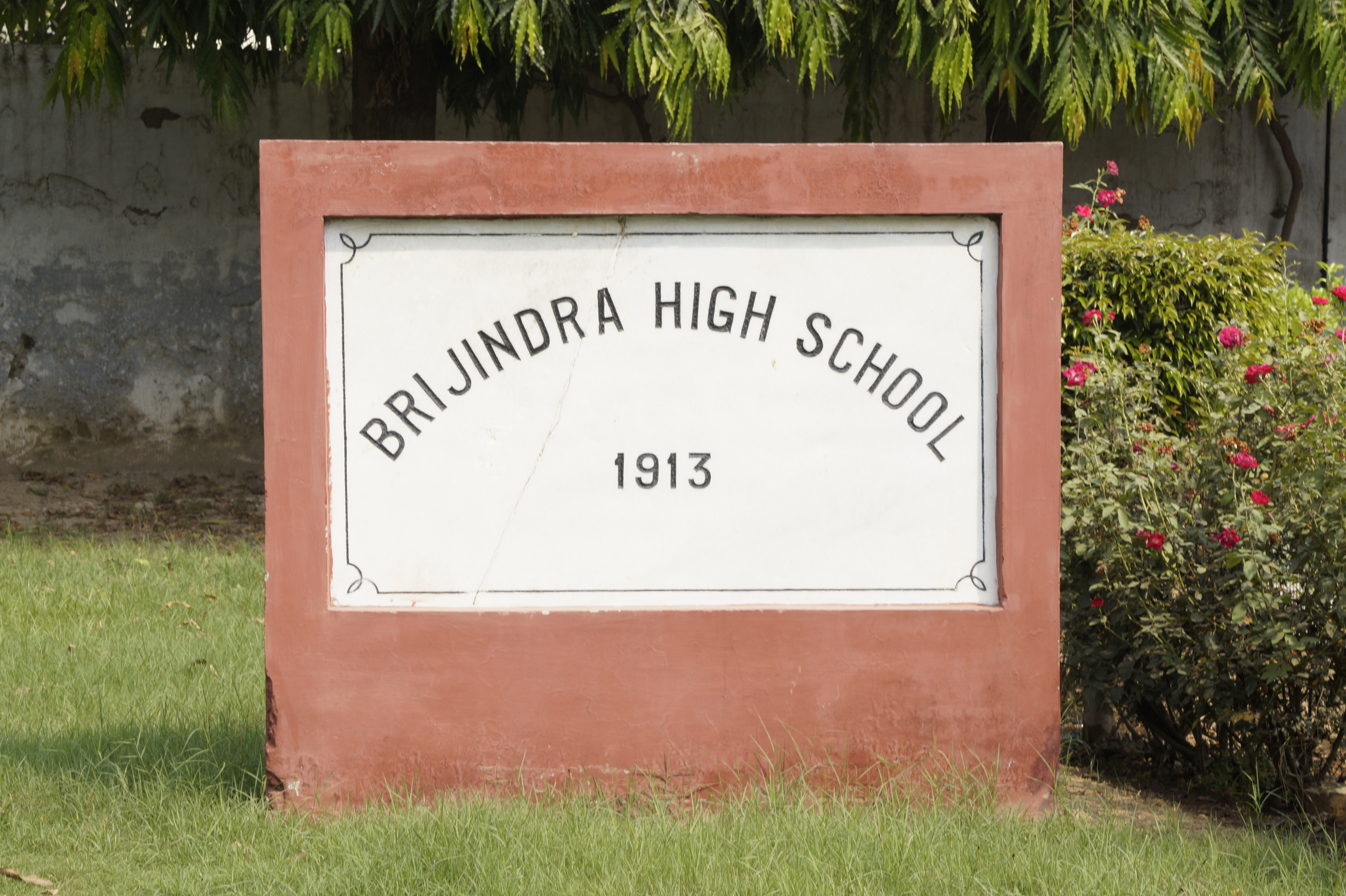
Govt. Brijindra College Faridkot

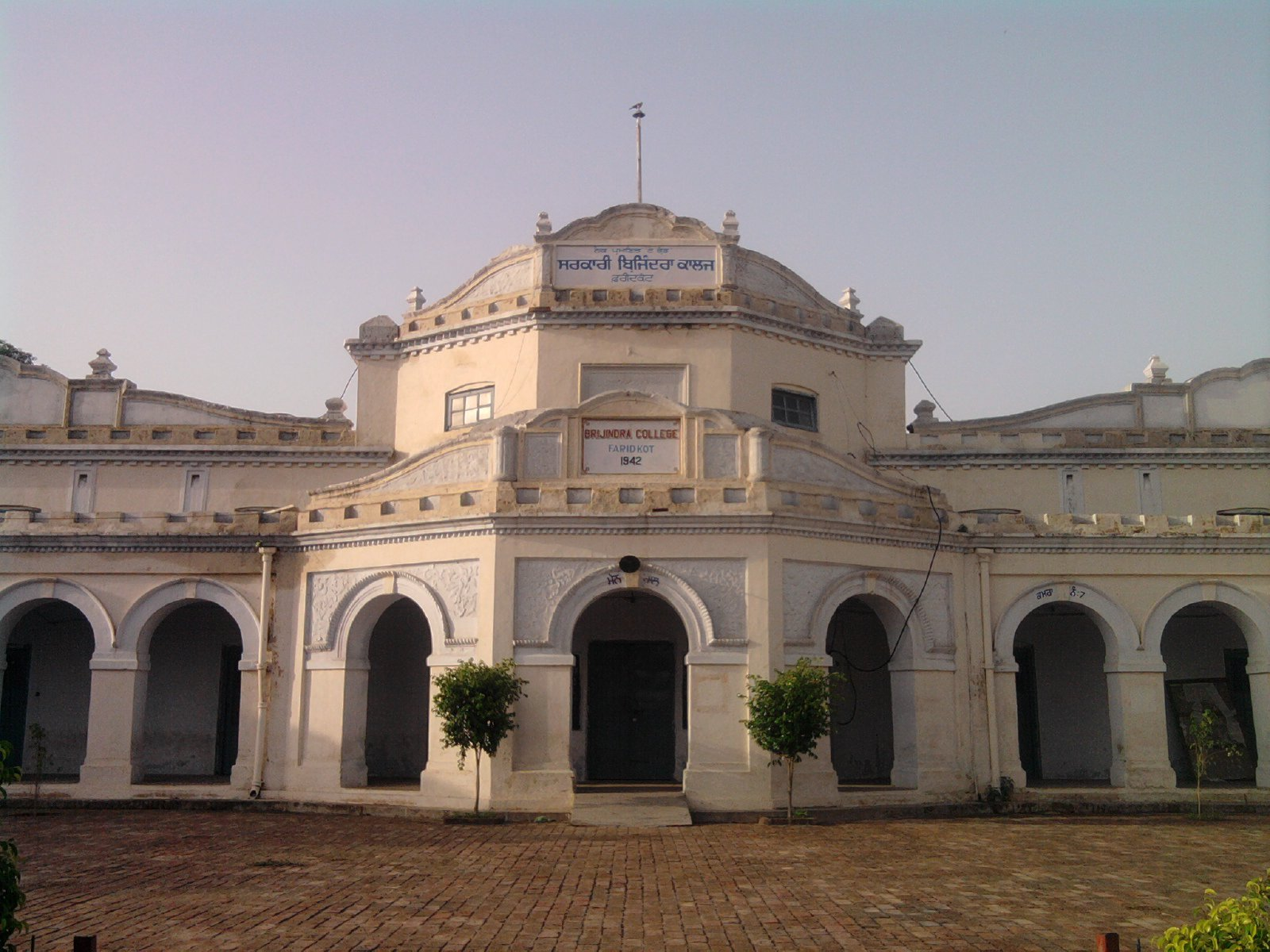
Govt.Brijindra College Faridkot

== List of villages ==
- Ahel
- Arayianwala Kalan
- Arayianwala Khurd
- Aulakh
- Bageana
- Bajakhana
- Bargari
- Beguwala
- Behbal kalan
- Behbal khurd
- Bhag Singh Wala
- Bhagthala Kalan
- Bhagthala Khurd
- Bhairon-Ki-Bhatti
- Bhana
- Bihlewala
- Bholuwala
- Bir Bholuwala
- Bir Chahal
- Bir Sikhanwala
- Burj Jawahar Singh Wala
- Burj Masta
- Buttar
- Chahal
- Chak Dhudi
- Chak Kalyan
- Chak Sahu
- Chak Seman
- Chak Shama
- Chambeli
- Chand baja
- Chaina
- Chet Singh Wala
- Chugewala
- Dabrikhana
- Daggo Romana
- Dallewala
- Dana Romana
- Dawareana
- Deep Singh Wala
- Deviwala
- Dhab Sher Singh Wala
- Dhaipai
- Dhilwan Kalan
- Dhilwan Khurd
- Dhimanwali
- Dhudi
- Dhurkot
- Dod
- Faridkot (Rural)
- Ghaniewala
- Ghoniwala
- Ghuduwala
- Ghugiana
- Ghumiara
- Gondara
- Golewala
- Gurusar
- Hardialeana
- Hari Nau
- Hariewala
- Hassan Bhatti
- Jalaleana
- Jand Sahib
- Jandwala
- Janerian
- Jeonwala
- Jhakhar Wala
- Jhariwala
- Jhok Sarkari
- Jhotiwala
- Kabalwala
- Kaler
- Kamiana
- Kanianwali
- Kauni
- Khara
- Khilchi
- Kingra
- Koharwala
- Kot Sukhia
- Kotha Guru
- Kothe Kehar Singh
- Lambwali
- Machaki Kalan
- Machaki Khurd
- Machaki Mal Singh
- Malla
- Mallewala
- Mandwala
- Mani Singh Wala
- Marahar
- Matta
- Maur
- Mehmuana
- Midu Maan
- Mishriwala
- Moranwali
- Mumara
- Nangal
- Naraingarh
- Nathalwala
- Nathewala
- Pakhi Kalan
- Pakhi Khurd
- Pakka
- Panjgrain Kalan
- Pehluwala
- Phide Kalan
- Phide Khurd
- Pindi Balochan
- Pipli (Village)
- Qila Nau
- Rajowala
- Ratti Rori
- Rupianwala
- Sadhanwala
- Sadhuwala
- Sadiq
- Saideke
- Sandhwan
- Sangatpura
- Sango Romana
- Sangrahur
- Sarawan
- Sher Singh Wala
- Sibbian
- Sikhanwala
- Simrewala
- Sirsari
- Sukhanwala
- Tehna
- Thara
- Virewala Kalan
- Virewala Khurd
- Wander Jatana
- Wara Daraka
- Rorikapura

== Demographics ==
According to the 2011 census Faridkot district has a population of 617,508, roughly equal to the nation of Solomon Islands or the US state of Vermont. This gives it a ranking of 519th in India (out of a total of 640). The district has a population density of 424 inhabitants per square kilometre (1,100/sq mi). Its population growth rate over the decade 2001-2011 was 12.18%. Faridkot has a sex ratio of 889 females for every 1000 males, and a literacy rate of 70.6%. Scheduled Castes made up 38.92% of the population.

=== Gender ===
The table below shows the sex ratio of Faridkot district through decades.

Sex ratio of Faridkot district
Census Year	1951	1961	1971	1981	1991	2001	2011
Sex Ratio	856	849	866	879	883	883	890

The table below shows the child sex ratio of children below the age of 6 years in the rural and urban areas of Faridkot district.

Child sex ratio of children below the age of 6 years in Faridkot district
Year	Urban	Rural
2011	844	854
2001	797	820

=== Religions ===
Religion in Faridkot district (2011)
Religion	Percent
Sikhism	55.66%
Hinduism	41.23%
Islam	1.25%
Buddhism	0.82%
Christianity	0.66%
Other or not stated	0.38%

Religion in tehsils of Faridkot district (2011)
Tehsil	Sikhism (%)	Hinduism (%)	Islam (%)	Others (%)
Faridkot	74.55	24.43	0.41	0.62
Jaitu	80.42	18.53	0.79	0.26

Religion in Faridkot district (2011)
Religion	Percent
Sikhism	76.08%
Hinduism	22.89%
Islam	0.51%
Other or not stated	0.52%

The table below shows the population of different religions in absolute numbers in the urban and rural areas of Faridkot district. Note:- The separation of Moga and Muktsar district from Faridkot in 1995 caused significant changes in the population numbers after that year.

Absolute numbers of different religious groups in Faridkot district
Religion	Urban (2011)	Rural (2011)	Urban (2001)	Rural (2001)	Urban (1991)	Rural (1991)
Hindu	1,12,625	28,738	97,765	21,937	1,97,618	98,506
Sikh	1,00,593	3,69,196	93,290	3,33,814	1,42,770	9,87,591
Muslim	1,503	1,622	729	1,010	447	4,697
Christian	743	484	543	396	1,181	1,209
Other religions	1,587	417	1,244	164	15,538	656

Religious groups in Faridkot District (British Punjab province era)
Religious group	1881		1891		1901		1911		1921		1931		1941	
Religious group	Pop.	%	Pop.	%	Pop.	%	Pop.	%	Pop.	%	Pop.	%	Pop.	%
Sikhism	40,187	41.42%	47,164	41%	52,721	42.21%	55,397	42.52%	66,658	44.24%	92,880	56.51%	115,070	57.74%
Islam	29,035	29.92%	34,376	29.88%	35,996	28.82%	37,105	28.48%	44,813	29.74%	49,912	30.37%	61,352	30.79%
Hinduism (Note: 1931-1941: Including Ad-Dharmis)	27,463	28.3%	33,079	28.75%	35,778	28.64%	37,377	28.69%	38,610	25.63%	20,855	12.69%	21,814	10.95%
Jainism	349	0.36%	408	0.35%	406	0.33%	409	0.31%	473	0.31%	550	0.33%	800	0.4%
Christianity	0	0%	13	0.01%	11	0.01%	6	0%	107	0.07%	167	0.1%	247	0.12%
Zoroastrianism	0	0%	0	0%	0	0%	0	0%	0	0%	0	0%	0	0%
Buddhism	0	0%	0	0%	0	0%	0	0%	0	0%	0	0%	0	0%
Judaism	—N/a	—N/a	0	0%	0	0%	0	0%	0	0%	0	0%	0	0%
Others	0	0%	0	0%	0	0%	0	0%	0	0%	0	0%	0	0%
Total population	97,034	100%	115,040	100%	124,912	100%	130,294	100%	150,661	100%	164,364	100%	199,283	100%
Note1: British Punjab province era district borders are not an exact match in the present-day due to various bifurcations to district borders — which since created new districts — throughout the historic Punjab Province region during the post-independence era that have taken into account population increases. Note2: British Punjab province era figures are for Faridkot State.

=== Languages ===
Languages of Faridkot district (2011)
1. Punjabi (91.8%)
2. Hindi (6.91%)
3. Others (1.30%)

At the time of the 2011 census, 91.79% of the population spoke Punjabi and 6.91% Hindi as their first language.

== Health ==
The number of registered doctors in the Faridkot district were 1,345 and 2,997 registered nurses, as of year 2018.

The table below shows the data from the district nutrition profile of children below the age of 5 years, in Fridkot, as of year 2020.

District nutrition profile of children under 5 years of age in Fridkot, year 2020
Indicators	Number of children (<5 years)	Percent (2020)	Percent (2016)
Stunted	13,534	28%	35%
Wasted	4,931	10%	23%
Severely wasted	1,328	3%	11%
Underweight	9,973	21%	27%
Overweight/obesity	1,313	3%	1%
Anemia	32,889	76%	61%
Total children	48,111		

The table below shows the district nutrition profile of Fridkot of women between the ages of 15 and 49 years, as of year 2020.

District nutritional profile of Fridkot of women of 15–49 years, in 2020
Indicators	Number of women (15–49 years)	Percent (2020)	Percent (2016)
Underweight (BMI <18.5 kg/m^2)	31,663	16%	11%
Overweight/obesity	76,581	39%	24%
Hypertension	50,788	26%	12%
Diabetes	29,369	15%	NA
Anemia (non-preg)	123,249	63%	43%
Anemia (preg)	6,298	58%	27%
Total women (preg)	10,907		
Total women	194,368		

The table below shows the current use of family planning methods by currently married women between the ages of 15 and 49 years, in Faridkot district.

Family planning methods used by women between the ages of 15 and 49 years, in Faridkot district
Method	Total (2015–16)	Urban (2015–16)	Rural (2015–16)
Female sterilization	48.1%	46.6%	48.7%
Male sterilization	0.1%	0.0%	0.2%
IUD/PPIUD	11.1%	11.8%	10.9%
Pill	2.4%	2.2%	2.5%
Condom	12.1%	19.6%	9.5%
Any modern method	73.9%	80.1%	71.7%
Any method	81.5%	85.0%	80.3%
Total unmet need	5.6%	2.3%	6.8%
Unmet need for spacing	4.1%	1.4%	5.1%
