= Bajakhana =

Bajakhana, Punjab
- Village
- Interactive map of Bajakhana, Punjab
- Location in Punjab, India Bajakhana, Punjab (India)
- Coordinates: 30.455918°N 74.983239°E
- Country: India
- State: Punjab
- District: Faridkot

Government
  - Type: Local Government
  - Body: State Government of Punjab, Government of India
- Elevation: 210 m (690 ft)

Population (2011)
  - Total: 6,422

Languages
  - Principal: Punjabi, Hindi
- Time zone: UTC+5:30 (IST)
- PIN: 151205
- Telephone code: 01635
- Vehicle registration: PB- 04

Bajakhana is a small village in Faridkot district in the Indian state of Punjab.

== Location ==
The village of Bajakhana lies between Kotkapura and Bathinda stretch of National Highway 54 in Faridkot district of the state Punjab.

== Nearby cities and towns ==
- Jaitu 9.8 km.
- Goniana 16.9 km.
- Bathinda 26.4 km.
- Bhisiana 28.5 km.
- Faridkot 32.5 km.

== Notable personalities ==
- Harjeet Brar Bajakhana (5 September 1971 – 16 April 1998), a professional kabaddi player
