= Kanianwali, Faridkot =

Village in Faridkot, Punjab, India

Kanianwali ਕਾਨਿਆਂਵਾਲੀ
- Village
- Interactive map of Kanianwali
- Coordinates: 30.697241°N 74.480578°E
- Country: India
- State: Punjab
- District: Faridkot

Government
  - Type: Sarpanch
  - Body: Gram panchayat

Population (2011)
  - Total: 984

Languages
  - Official: Punjabi
- Time zone: UTC+5:30 (IST)
- Postal code: 151203
- Nearest city: Sadiq (town), Faridkot, India

Kanianwali (Punjabi: ਕਾਨਿਆਂਵਾਲੀ) is a village located in Faridkot district of Punjab State. The Village has a population of 984 of which 506 are males while 478 are females as per the population census of 2011. The total geographical area of the village is about 392 hectares with 201 number of households. The postal code of the village is 151212.
