= Kingra, Faridkot =

Village in Faridkot, Punjab, India

Kingra ਕਿੰਗਰਾ
- Village
- Interactive map of Kingra
- Coordinates: 30.67576669728712°N 74.56975212536385°E
- Country: India
- State: Punjab
- District: Faridkot

Government
  - Type: Sarpanch
  - Body: Gram panchayat

Population (2011)
  - Total: 1,806

Languages
  - Official: Punjabi
- Time zone: UTC+5:30 (IST)
- Postal code: 151203
- Nearest city: Sadiq (town), Faridkot, India

Kingra (Punjabi: ਕਿੰਗਰਾ) is a village located in Faridkot district of Punjab State. The village has a population of 1,806 of which 948 are males while 858 are females as per the population census of 2011. The total geographical area of the village is about 643 hectares with 334 number of households. The postal code of the village is 151203.
