= Ghugiana =

Village in Punjab, India

Ghugiana ਘੁਗਿਆਣਾ
- village
- Interactive map of Ghugiana
- Country: india
- State: Punjab
- District: Faridkot
- block: Faridkot
- Elevation: 185 m (607 ft)

Population (2011)
  - Total: 2,852

Languages
  - official: Punjabi
- Time zone: UTC+5:30 (Indian Standard Time)
- Nearest city: Faridkot

Ghugiana (Punjabi: ਘੁਗਿਆਣਾ) is a village in Faridkot district in the Indian state of Punjab.

== Demographics ==
Village is located in Faridkot tehsil of Faridkot district. Its area is 950 hectares. According to the 2011 census, the population of this village is 2600. There is also a post office in this village, whose pin code is 151203. The nearest railway station, Golewala, is 8 km away.
