= Ahel =

Ahel may refer to:

== Places ==
- Ahel, Faridkot, Faridkot district, Punjab, India
- Ahel, Fars, Iran
