= Behbal kalan =

Village in Faridkot, Punjab, India

Behbal kalan ਬਹਿਬਲ ਕਲਾਂ
- Village
- Interactive map of Behbal kalan
- Coordinates: 30.527987211735137°N 74.9129200121274°E
- Country: India
- State: Punjab
- District: Faridkot

Government
  - Type: Sarpanch
  - Body: Gram panchayat

Population (2011)
  - Total: 2,376

Languages
  - Official: Punjabi
- Time zone: UTC+5:30 (IST)
- Postal code: 151208
- Vehicle registration: PB62
- Nearest city: Jaitu

Behbal kalan (Punjabi: ਬਹਿਬਲ ਕਲਾਂ) is a village located in Jaitu tehsil of Faridkot district of Punjab State. The Village has a population of 2376 of which 1255 are males while 1121 are females as per the population census of 2011. The postal code of the village is 151208. The total geographical area of the village is about 710 hectares.

== Behbal Kalan firing incident ==
In 2015, police opened fire at Behbal Kalan on people protesting against the desecration of Guru Granth Sahib in Bargari, Faridkot district of Punjab. Two protesters Krishan Bhagwan Singh and Gurjit Singh were killed in this firing incident. A case was registered against several police personnels in this matter. Despite the challan reports of the commissions and the special investigation teams (SIT's) formed from time to time being filed in the court, the victims have not been able to get justice till date. The case is still pending in the Punjab and Haryana High Court at Chandigarh.
