= Chaina =

Chaina may refer to:

- Chaina, Faridkot, a village in Punjab, India
- Chrysanthi Chaina (born 1982), Greek basketball player
- Hipólito Chaiña (1954–2021), Peruvian physician and politician

== See also ==
- Bardu Chaina, a village in Haryana, India
- Chaina Bhabish, an album by Shayan Chowdhury Arnob
- China (disambiguation)
