= Kauni =

Kauni may refer to:

- Kauni, Faridkot, a village in Faridkot district, Punjab, India
- Kauni, Sri Muktsar Sahib, a village in Sri Muktsar Sahib district, Punjab, India
