= Jandwala, Faridkot =

Village in Faridkot, Punjab, India

Jandwala ਜੰਡਵਾਲਾ
- Village
- Interactive map of Jandwala
- Coordinates: 30.720405°N 74.616386°E
- Country: India
- State: Punjab
- District: Faridkot

Government
  - Type: Sarpanch
  - Body: Gram panchayat

Population (2011)
  - Total: 888

Languages
  - Official: Punjabi
- Time zone: UTC+5:30 (IST)
- Postal code: 151203
- Nearest city: Sadiq (town) Faridkot, India

Jandwala (Punjabi: ਜੰਡਵਾਲਾ) is a village located in Faridkot district of Punjab State. The Village has a population of 888 of which 450 are males while 438 are females as per the population census of 2011. The total geographical area of the village is about 391 hectares with 171 households. The postal code of the village is 151203.
