= Janerian =

Village in Punjab, India

Janerian ਜਨੇਰੀਆਂ
- Village
- Location in Punjab, India
- Coordinates: 30.740822°N 74.583852°E
- Country: India
- State: Punjab
- District: Faridkot

Government
  - Body: Gram panchayat

Population (2011)
  - Total: 622

Languages
  - Official: Punjabi
- Time zone: UTC+5:30 (IST)
- Postal code: 151212
- Vehicle registration: PB
- Nearest city: Sadiq, Faridkot

Janerian (Punjabi: ਜਨੇਰੀਆਂ) is a village located in the Faridkot district in the Indian state of Punjab.

== Demographics ==
As per the population census of 2011, the village has population of 622 of which 317 are males while 305 were females. The total geographical area of village is 374 Hectares. The Postal code of village is 151212.
