= Jhariwala =

Village in Faridkot, Punjab, India

Jhariwala ਝਾੜੀਵਾਲਾ
- Village
- Interactive map of Jhariwala
- Coordinates: 30.825675121087016°N 74.66591837107894°E
- Country: India
- State: Punjab
- District: Faridkot

Government
  - Type: Sarpanch
  - Body: Gram panchayat

Population (2011)
  - Total: 907

Languages
  - Official: Punjabi
- Time zone: UTC+5:30 (IST)
- Postal code: 151203
- Nearest city: Faridkot

Jhariwala (Punjabi: ਝਾੜੀਵਾਲਾ) is a small village located in Faridkot district of Punjab State. The Village has a population of 907 of which 491 are males while 416 are females as per the population census of 2011. The total geographical area of the village is about 374 hectares with 170 households. The postal code of the village is 151203.
