= Tehna =

Village in Punjab, India

- Village
- Location in Punjab, India Tehna (India)
- Coordinates: 30.691087°N 74.796971°E
- Country: India
- States: Punjab
- District: Faridkot

Government
  - Type: Gram Panchayat
  - Body: Sarpanch

Languages
  - official: Punjabi (Gurmukhi)
- Time zone: UTC+5:30 (IST)
- PIN: 151203
- Nearest city: Faridkot

Tehna (Punjabi: ਟਹਿਣਾ) is a village located in Faridkot district of Punjab, India.

== Demographics ==
As per the population census of 2011, the village has a population of 3631, of which 1938 are males, while 1693 are females. The geographical area of village is about 8.13 square kilometers. The Postal code of village is 151203.
