= Kaler (village) =

Village in Punjab, India

Kaler ਕਲੇਰ
- Village
- Location in Punjab, India Kaler (India)
- Coordinates: 30.714105°N 74.830620°E
- Country: India
- States: Punjab
- District: Faridkot

Government
  - Type: Gram Panchayat
  - Body: Sarpanch

Languages
  - official: Punjabi (Gurmukhi)
- Time zone: UTC+5:30 (IST)
- PIN: 151203
- Nearest city: Faridkot

Kaler is a village located in Faridkot district of Punjab, India. As per the population census of 2011, the village has population of 1365 of which 735 are males and 630 were females. The geographical area of village is about 457 Hectares.
