= Pakka, Faridkot =

Village in Faridkot, Punjab, India

Pakka ਪੱਕਾ
- Village
- Interactive map of Pakka
- Coordinates: 30.70848115096793°N 74.80575811144091°E
- Country: India
- State: Punjab
- District: Faridkot

Government
  - Type: Sarpanch
  - Body: Gram panchayat

Population (2011)
  - Total: 4,453

Languages
  - Official: Punjabi
- Time zone: UTC+5:30 (IST)
- Postal code: 151213
- Nearest city: Faridkot, India

Pakka (Punjabi: ਪੱਕਾ) is a village located in Faridkot district of Punjab State. The Village has a population of 4453 of which 2373 are males while 2080 are females as per the population census of 2011. The total geographical area of the village is about 1,459 hectares. The postal code of the village is 151213.
