= Chet Singh Wala =

Village in Punjab, India

- Village
- Location in Punjab, India
- Coordinates: 30.661°N 74.6596°E
- Country: India
- State: Punjab
- District: Faridkot

Government
  - Type: Sarpanch
  - Body: Gram panchayat

Population (2011)
  - Total: 1,212

Languages
  - Official: Punjabi
- Time zone: UTC+5:30 (IST)
- Postal code: 151212
- Vehicle registration: PB
- Nearest city: Faridkot

Chet Singh Wala is a village located in Faridkot district of Punjab, India. The Village has a population of 1212 of which 630 are males while 582 are females as per the population census of 2011, which raised to 1305 in the year 2020. The postal code of the village is 151212. The total geographical area of the village is about 407 hectares.
