= Mallewala =

Village in Faridkot, Punjab, India

Mallewala ਮੱਲੇਵਾਲਾ
- Village
- Interactive map of Mallewala
- Coordinates: 30.792694°N 74.754566°E
- Country: India
- State: Punjab
- District: Faridkot

Government
  - Type: Sarpanch
  - Body: Gram panchayat

Population (2011)
  - Total: 244

Languages
  - Official: Punjabi
- Time zone: UTC+5:30 (IST)
- Postal code: 151203
- Vehicle registration: PB04
- Nearest city: Faridkot, India

Mallewala (Punjabi: ਮੱਲੇਵਾਲਾ) is a small village located in Faridkot district of Punjab State. The Village has a population of 244 of which 137 are males while 107 are females as per the population census of 2011. The total geographical area of the village is about 285 hectares with 48 households. The postal code of the village is 151203.
