= Dhudi =

Coordinates: 30°42′N 74°51′E

Dhudi is a village in Faridkot district of Punjab state of India. The total population of the village is about 4,165.
