= Chambeli =

Village in Punjab, India

- village
- ਚੰਬੇਲੀ
- Location in Punjab, India Chambeli (India)
- Coordinates: 30.670673°N 74.848709°E

Population (2011)
  - Total: 1,052

Languages
  - Official: Punjabi
- Time zone: UTC+5:30 (IST)
- PIN Code: 151203
- Telephone code: +91-
- Vehicle registration: PB04
- Nearby cities: Faridkot

Chambeli (Punjabi: ਚੰਬੇਲੀ) is a village located in Faridkot tehsil of Faridkot district of Punjab, India. According to the 2011 census, the population of this village is 1052, out of which 549 are males and 503 are females. The postal code of the village is 151203. The nearest city is Faridkot.
