= Hari Nau =

Village in district Faridkot of Punjab, India

Hari Nau ਹਰੀ ਨੌਂ
- Village
- Location in Punjab, India Hari Nau (India)
- Coordinates: 30.4991699336285°N 74.79515796429281°E
- Country: India
- States: Punjab
- District: Faridkot

Government
  - Type: Gram Panchayat
  - Body: Sarpanch

Languages
  - official: Punjabi (Gurmukhi)
- Time zone: UTC+5:30 (IST)
- PIN: 151204
- Nearest city: Kotkapura

Hari Nau (Punjabi: ਹਰੀ ਨੌਂ) is a village located in Jaito tehsil of Faridkot district of Punjab, India.

== Demographics ==
As per the population census of 2011, the village has a population of 5711 of which 3034 are males while 2677 are females. The geographical area of village is about 1691 Hectares/16.91 KM^{2}. The Postal code of village is 151204. The nearest railway station is Romana Albel Singh, 4.56 km away.

No. of Households - 1075
S. No.	Indicators	Persons	Males	Females
1	Population	5,711	3,034	2,677
2	Child Population	659	366	293
3	Scheduled Castes	2,059	1,102	957
4	Scheduled Tribes	0	0	0
5	Literate	3,429	1,960	1,469
6	Illiterate	2,282	1,074	1,208
7	Workers	1,886	1,747	139
8	Non Workers	3,825	1,287	2,538
