= Dalewala =

Village in Punjab, India

Dallewala ਡੱਲੇਵਾਲਾ
- Village
- Interactive map of Dallewala
- Coordinates: 30.799°N 74.655°E
- Country: India
- State: Punjab
- District: Faridkot

Government
  - Type: Sarpanch
  - Body: Gram panchayat

Population (2011)
  - Total: 1,033

Languages
  - Official: Punjabi
- Time zone: UTC+5:30 (IST)
- Postal code: 151203
- Vehicle registration: PB
- Nearest city: Faridkot
- Governing body: Gram panchayat

Dallewala (Punjabi: ਡੱਲੇਵਾਲਾ) is a village located in the Faridkot tehsil of Faridkot district in the Indian state of Punjab.

== Demographics ==
The Village has a population of 1033 of which 555 are males while 478 are females as per the census of 2011. The postal code of the village is 151203. Total geographical area of the village is 291 hectares according to census of 2011.
