= Mani Singh Wala =

Village in Punjab, India

Mani Singh Wala ਮਾਨੀ ਸਿੰਘ ਵਾਲਾ
- Village
- Location in Punjab, India Mani Singh Wala (India)
- Coordinates: 30.694999°N 74.593973°E
- Country: India
- States: Punjab
- District: Faridkot

Government
  - Type: Gram Panchayat
  - Body: Sarpanch

Languages
  - official: Punjabi (Gurmukhi)
- Time zone: UTC+5:30 (IST)
- PIN: 151212
- Nearest city: Faridkot

Mani Singh Wala is a village located in Faridkot district of Punjab, India.

== Demographics ==
As per the population census of 2011, the village has population of 2529 of which 1335 are males while 1194 were females. The geographical area of village is about 553 hectares. The Postal code of village is 151212.
