= Dhab Sher Singh Wala =

Village in Faridkot, Punjab, India

Dhab Sher Singh Wala ਢਾਬ ਸ਼ੇਰ ਸਿੰਘ ਵਾਲਾ
- Village
- Interactive map of Dhab Sher Singh Wala
- Coordinates: 30.658328°N 74.614301°E
- Country: India
- State: Punjab
- District: Faridkot

Government
  - Type: Sarpanch
  - Body: Gram panchayat

Population (2011)
  - Total: 1,443

Languages
  - Official: Punjabi
- Time zone: UTC+5:30 (IST)
- Postal code: 151212
- Vehicle registration: PB04
- Nearest city: Faridkot

Dhab Sher SIngh Wala (Punjabi: ਢਾਬ ਸ਼ੇਰ ਸਿੰਘ ਵਾਲਾ) is a village located in Faridkot district of Punjab State. The village has a population of 1443 of which 779 are males while 664 are females as per the population census of 2011. The total geographical area of the village is about 455 hectares.
