= Khara, Faridkot =

Village in Faridkot district of Punjab, India

Khara ਖਾਰਾ
- Village
- Interactive map of Khara
- Coordinates: 30.533524°N 74.713426°E
- Country: India
- State: Punjab
- District: Faridkot

Government
  - Body: Gram panchayat

Population (2011)
  - Total: 5,562

Languages
  - Official: Punjabi
- Time zone: UTC+5:30 (IST)
- Postal code: 152025
- Vehicle registration: PB
- Nearest city: Kotkapura

Khara (Punjabi: ਖਾਰਾ) is a village located in Kotkapura tehsil of Faridkot district in the Indian state of Punjab.

== Demographics ==
The Village has a population of 5562 of which 2943 are males while 2619 are females as per the census of 2011. Total geographical area of the village is about 1798 hectares with 1,055 households. The postal code of the village is 152025.

== Schools ==
- Government Primary School, Khara
- Government Senior Secondary School, Khara
