= Koharwala =

Village in Faridkot, Punjab, India

Koharwala ਕੋਹਾਰਵਾਲਾ
- Village
- Interactive map of Koharwala
- Coordinates: 30.532578°N 74.790766°E
- Country: India
- State: Punjab
- District: Faridkot

Government
  - Type: Sarpanch
  - Body: Gram panchayat

Population (2011)
  - Total: 3,000

Languages
  - Official: Punjabi
- Time zone: UTC+5:30 (IST)
- Postal code: 151204
- Nearest city: Faridkot, India

Koharwala (Punjabi: ਕੋਹਾਰਵਾਲਾ) is a village located in Faridkot district of Punjab State. The Village has a population of 3000 of which 1598 are males while 1402 are females as per the population census of 2011. The total geographical area of the village is about 541 hectares with 631 number of households. The postal code of the village is 151204.
