= Bhag Singh Wala =

Village in Punjab, India

- Village
- Interactive map of Bhag Singh Wala
- Coordinates: 30.68466109562015°N 74.54240581216891°E
- Country: India
- State: Punjab
- District: Faridkot

Government
  - Body: Gram panchayat

Population (2011)
  - Total: 1,025

Languages
  - Official: Punjabi
- Time zone: UTC+5:30 (IST)
- Postal code: 151212
- Vehicle registration: PB
- Nearest city: Faridkot

Bhag Singh Wala (Punjabi: ਭਾਗ ਸਿੰਘ ਵਾਲਾ) is a village located in the Faridkot district in the Indian state of Punjab. The village has a population of 1,025 of which 517 are males while 508 are females as per the census of 2011. The postal code of the village is 151212.
