= Mehmuana =

Village in Faridkot, Punjab, India

Mehmuana ਮਹਿਮੂਆਣਾ
- Village
- Interactive map of Mehmuana
- Coordinates: 30.696269956192957°N 74.6409642870438°E
- Country: India
- State: Punjab
- District: Faridkot

Government
  - Type: Sarpanch
  - Body: Gram panchayat

Population (2011)
  - Total: 2,729

Languages
  - Official: Punjabi
- Time zone: UTC+5:30 (IST)
- Postal code: 151203
- Nearest city: Faridkot, India

Mehmuana (Punjabi: ਮਹਿਮੂਆਣਾ) is a village located in Faridkot district of Punjab State.

== Demographics ==
The Village has a population of 2729 of which 1437 are males while 1292 are females as per the population census of 2011. The total geographical area of the village is about 912 hectares with 523 number of households. The postal code of the village is 151203.
