= Dhilwan Khurd =

Village in Faridkot, Punjab, India

Dhilwan Khurd ਢਿੱਲਵਾਂ ਖੁਰਦ
- Village
- Interactive map of Dhilwan Khurd
- Coordinates: 30.739927°N 74.603884°E
- Country: India
- State: Punjab
- District: Faridkot

Government
  - Type: Sarpanch
  - Body: Gram panchayat

Population (2011)
  - Total: 1,361

Languages
  - Official: Punjabi
- Time zone: UTC+5:30 (IST)
- Postal code: 151203
- Nearest city: Faridkot

Dhilwan Khurd (Punjabi: ਢਿੱਲਵਾਂ ਖੁਰਦ) is a village located in Faridkot district of Punjab State. The village has a population of 1,361 of which 709 are males while 652 are females as per the population census of 2011. The total geographical area of the village is about 414 hectares. The postal code of the village is 151203.
