= Matta, Faridkot =

Village in Faridkot district of Punjab, India

Matta ਮੱਤਾ
- Village
- Interactive map of Matta
- Coordinates: 30.484211422276083°N 74.83653904726386°E
- Country: India
- State: Punjab
- District: Faridkot

Government
  - Body: Gram panchayat

Population (2011)
  - Total: 6,121

Languages
  - Official: Punjabi
- Time zone: UTC+5:30 (IST)
- Postal code: 151204
- Vehicle registration: PB
- Nearest city: Kotkapura

Matta (Punjabi: ਮੱਤਾ) is a village located in Jaitu tehsil of Faridkot district in the Indian state of Punjab.

== Demographics ==
The Village has a population of 6121 of which 3241 are males while 2880 are females as per the census of 2011. Total geographical area of the village is about 1,852 hectares. The postal code of the village is 151204.

== Schools ==
- Government Primary School, Matta
- Government Senior Secondary School, Matta
