= Sher Singh Wala =

Village in Punjab, India

- Village
- Location in Punjab, India
- Coordinates: 30.6659655714183°N 74.62909665034165°E

Government
  - Type: Sarpanch
  - Body: Gram panchayat

Population (2011)
  - Total: 2,016

Languages
  - Official: Punjabi
- Time zone: UTC+5:30 (IST)
- PIN: 151203
- Telephone code: +91-
- Nearest cities: Sadiq

Sher SIngh Wala (Punjabi: ਸ਼ੇਰ ਸਿੰਘ ਵਾਲਾ) is a village located in Faridkot district of Punjab State. The village has a population of 2016 of which 1,042 are males while 974 are females as per the population census of 2011. The total geographical area of the village is about 18.87 km².

== Education ==
- Government Primary School
