= Sadhanwala =

Village in Faridkot, Punjab, India

Sadhanwala ਸਾਧਾਂਵਾਲਾ
- Village
- Interactive map of Sadhanwala
- Coordinates: 30.814701572675506°N 74.63854911440916°E
- Country: India
- State: Punjab
- District: Faridkot

Government
  - Type: Sarpanch
  - Body: Gram panchayat

Population (2011)
  - Total: 2,147

Languages
  - Official: Punjabi
- Time zone: UTC+5:30 (IST)
- Postal code: 151214
- Nearest city: Faridkot, India

Sadhanwala (Punjabi: ਸਾਧਾਂਵਾਲਾ) is a village located in Faridkot district of Punjab State.

== Demographics ==
The Village has a population of 2147 of which 1141 are males while 1006 are females as per the population census of 2011. The total geographical area of the village is about 530 hectares with 403 number of households. The postal code of the village is 151214.
