= Panjgrain Kalan =

Village in Punjab, India

Panjgrain Kalan ਪੰਜਗਰਾਂਈ ਕਲਾਂ
- Village
- Interactive map of Panjgrain Kalan
- Coordinates: 30.609172°N 74.914765°E
- Country: India
- State: Punjab
- District: Faridkot

Government
  - Body: Gram panchayat

Population (2011)
  - Total: 10,663

Languages
  - Official: Punjabi
- Time zone: UTC+5:30 (IST)
- Postal code: 151207
- Vehicle registration: PB
- Nearest city: Kotkapura

Panjgrain Kalan (Punjabi: ਪੰਜਗਰਾਂਈ ਕਲਾਂ) is a village located in the Kotkapura tehsil of Faridkot district in the Indian state of Punjab.

== Demographics ==
The Village has a population of 10663 of which 5580 are males while 5083 are females as per the census of 2011. Total geographical area of the village is about 2913 hectares. The postal code of the village is 151207.

== Education ==
- Govt. Senior Secondary School (Girls).
