= Dhurkot, Faridkot =

Village in Punjab, India

Dhulkot Dhurkot
- Village
- Interactive map of Dhulkot
- Coordinates: 30.719°N 74.890°E
- Country: India
- State: Punjab
- District: Faridkot

Government
  - Type: Sarpanch
  - Body: Gram panchayat

Population (2011)
  - Total: 3,673

Languages
  - Official: Punjabi
- Time zone: UTC+5:30 (IST)
- Postal code: 151213
- Vehicle registration: PB
- Nearest city: Faridkot

Dhurkot (Punjabi: ਧੂਰਕੋਟ) sometimes spelled as dhulkot is a village located in Faridkot district of Punjab State.

== Demographics ==
The Village has a population of 3673 of which 1939 are males while 1734 are females as per the population census of 2011 with total 672 no. of houses. The postal code of the village is 151213. The total geographical area of the village is about 971 hectares.
