= Arayianwala Kalan =

- Village
- Location in Punjab, India Arayianwala Kalan (India)
- Coordinates: 30.722456°N 74.689879°E

Population (2011)
  - Total: 1,042

Languages
  - Official: Punjabi
- Time zone: UTC+5:30 (IST)
- PIN: 151203
- Telephone code: +91-
- Nearest cities: Faridkot

Arayianwala Kalan (Punjabi: ਅਰਾਈਆਂਵਾਲਾ ਕਲਾਂ) is a village located in Faridkot district of Punjab, India. It is situated 8km away from Faridkot City. The Arayanwala Kalan village has a population of 6051 of which 3165 are males while 2886 are females as per Population Census 2011. The census code of this village is 035530. The total geographical area of Arayianwala Kalan is 2221 Hectares / 22.21 KM^{2}.
