= Pehluwala =

Village in Faridkot, Punjab, India

Pehluwala ਪਹਿਲੂਵਾਲਾ
- Village
- Interactive map of Pehluwala
- Coordinates: 30.800318661661542°N 74.76500100727513°E
- Country: India
- State: Punjab
- District: Faridkot

Government
  - Type: Sarpanch
  - Body: Gram panchayat

Population (2011)
  - Total: 1,481

Languages
  - Official: Punjabi
- Time zone: UTC+5:30 (IST)
- Postal code: 151203
- Nearest city: Faridkot, India

Pehluwala (Punjabi: ਪਹਿਲੂਵਾਲਾ) is a village located in Faridkot district of Punjab State.

== Demographics ==
The village has a population of 1,481 of which 758 are males while 723 are females as per the population census of 2011. The total geographical area of the village is about 695 hectares with 270 number of households. The postal code of the village is 151204.
