= Sirsari =

Village in Faridkot district of Punjab, India

Sirsari ਸਿਰਸੜ੍ਹੀ
- Village
- Interactive map of Sirsari
- Coordinates: 30.644321°N 74.876837°E
- Country: India
- State: Punjab
- District: Faridkot

Government
  - Body: Gram panchayat

Population (2011)
  - Total: 1,767

Languages
  - Official: Punjabi
- Time zone: UTC+5:30 (IST)
- Postal code: 151204
- Vehicle registration: PB
- Nearest city: Kotkapura

Sirsari (Punjabi: ਸਿਰਸੜ੍ਹੀ) is a village located in Faridkot district in the Indian state of Punjab.

== Demographics ==
The village has a population of 1,767 of which 941 are males while 826 are females as per the census of 2011. Total geographical area of the village is about 552 hectares with 336 households. The postal code of the village is 151204.

== Schools ==
- Government Primary School, Sirsari
- Government Middle School, Sirsari
