= Sango Romana =

Village in Faridkot district of Punjab, India

Sango Romana ਸੰਗੋ ਰੋਮਾਣਾ
- Village
- Interactive map of Sango Romana
- Coordinates: 30.609845020475845°N 74.68586879420745°E
- Country: India
- State: Punjab
- District: Faridkot

Government
  - Body: Gram panchayat

Population (2011)
  - Total: 204

Languages
  - Official: Punjabi
- Time zone: UTC+5:30 (IST)
- Postal code: 151213
- Vehicle registration: PB
- Nearest city: Faridkot

Sango Romana (Punjabi: ਸੰਗੋ ਰੋਮਾਣਾ) is a village located in Faridkot district in the Indian state of Punjab.

== Demographics ==
The Village has a population of 204 of which 113 are males while 91 are females as per the census of 2011. Total geographical area of the village is about 552 hectares with 336 households. The postal code of the village is 151213.

== Schools ==
- Government Primary School, Dana Romana
