= Jhok Sarkari =

Jhok Sarkari Jhoke Sarkari
- Village
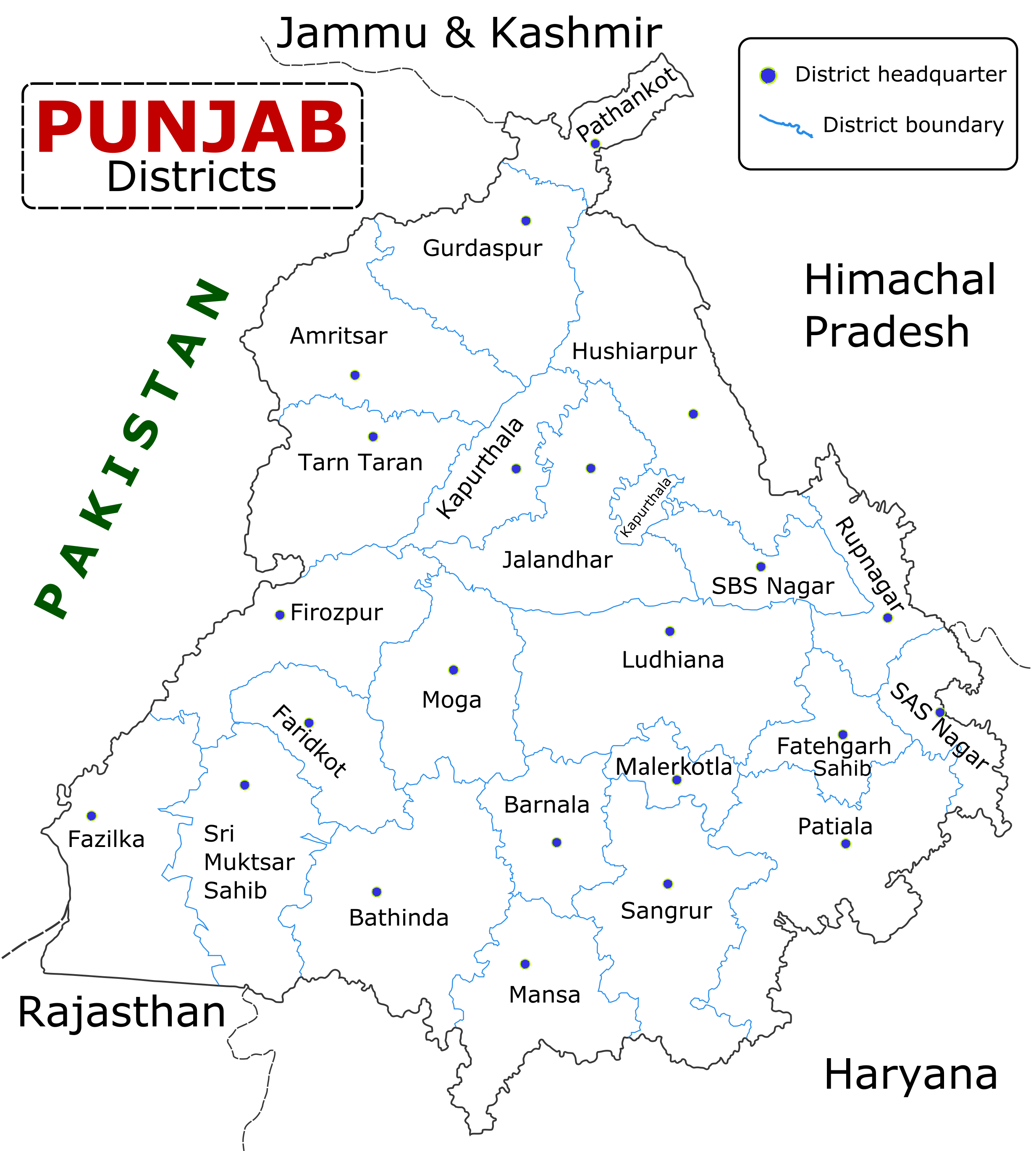

- Location within Punjab Location within India
- Coordinates: 30.7651112°N 74.5419340999999°E
- Country: India
- State: Punjab
- District: Faridkot
- Established: 13th Century
- Founder: Sandhu's
- Named for: Sandhu Jatts

Government
  - Type: village panchayat
  - Body: Local

Area
  - Total: 3.80 km^{2} (1.47 sq mi)
- Elevation: 192 m (630 ft)

Population (2011)
  - Total: 1,185
  - Density: 230/km^{2} (600/sq mi)
- Demonym(s): Jhok, Sandhu

Languages
  - Official: Punjabi
- Time zone: UTC+5:30 (IST)
- PIN: 151212
- Telephone code: +91-1639
- Vehicle registration: PB-04
- Sex ratio: 1000/1000 ♂/♀
- Literacy: 72%
- Website: jhoke-sarkari.blogspot.com

Jhok Sarkari is a village in Punjab. It located 25 km away from Faridkot, Punjab. It is Basically Sandhu community's village, but with the time more communities migrated from other places. The population as per 2011 census was 1185 people. a big Ganges Canal (Rajasthan) passes through the village. 5 main roads are crossing through the village from them 4 are constructed as solid roads and one is kacha raasta towards Saideke

== Demographics ==
Particulars	Total	Male	Female
Population	1185	629	556
Literacy	64%	70%	57%
No. of Houses	240	_	_

== Nearby villages ==
Sadiq	8 km
deep singh wala	6 km
Kauni	1.5 km
saide ke	2.5 km
Butter	1.5 km
Sangrahur	2.5 km

== The nearest railway station ==
The nearest railway station to Jhoke Sarkari is Kohar Singhwala which is located in and around 9.2 kilometers distance. The following table shows other railway stations and its distance from Jhok.

Kohar Singhwala railway station 9.2 km.

Guru Har Sahai railway station 14.6 km.

Golehwala railway station 15.7 km.

Firozpur Cantonment railway station 21.0 km.

Firozpur railway station 22.2 km.
