= Sangrahur =

Village in Faridkot, Punjab, India

Sangrahur ਸੰਗਰਾਹੂਰ
- Village
- Interactive map of Sangrahur
- Coordinates: 30.758944°N 74.576844°E
- Country: India
- State: Punjab
- District: Faridkot

Government
  - Type: Sarpanch
  - Body: Gram panchayat

Population (2011)
  - Total: 1,195

Languages
  - Official: Punjabi
- Time zone: UTC+5:30 (IST)
- Postal code: 151203
- Vehicle registration: PB04
- Nearest city: Faridkot

Sangrahur (Punjabi: ਸੰਗਰਾਹੂਰ) is a village in Faridkot district in the Indian state of Punjab. The Village has a population of 1195 of which 633 are males while 562 are females as per the population census of 2011. The total geographical area of the village is about 1,362 hectares. The postal code of the village is 142052.
