= Bhagthala Khurd =

Village in Punjab, India

Bhagthala Khurd ਭਾਗਥਲਾ ਖੁਰਦ
- Village
- Interactive map of Bhagthala Khurd
- Coordinates: 30.779534°N 74.786403°E
- Country: India
- State: Punjab
- District: Faridkot

Government
  - Type: Sarpanch
  - Body: Gram panchayat

Population (2011)
  - Total: 727

Languages
  - Official: Punjabi
- Time zone: UTC+5:30 (IST)
- Postal code: 151213
- Vehicle registration: PB
- Nearest city: Faridkot

Bhagthala Khurd (Punjabi: ਭਾਗਥਲਾ ਖੁਰਦ) is a village located in Faridkot district of Punjab State. The Village has a population of 727 as per the population census of 2011. The postal code of the village is 151203. The total geographical area of the village is about 320 hectares.
