= Ghumiara =

Village in Faridkot, Punjab, India

Ghumiara ਘੁਮਿਆਰਾ
- Village
- Interactive map of Ghumiara
- Coordinates: 30.757492°N 74.831432°E
- Country: India
- State: Punjab
- District: Faridkot

Government
  - Type: Sarpanch
  - Body: Gram panchayat

Population (2011)
  - Total: 952

Languages
  - Official: Punjabi
- Time zone: UTC+5:30 (IST)
- Postal code: 151203
- Nearest city: Faridkot

Ghumiara (Punjabi: ਘੁਮਿਆਰਾ) is a village located in Faridkot district of Punjab State. The Village has a population of 952 of which 516 are males while 436 are females as per the population census of 2011. The total geographical area of the village is about 370 hectares. The postal code of the village is 151203.
