= Harjeet Brar Bajakhana =

Punjabi kabaddi player

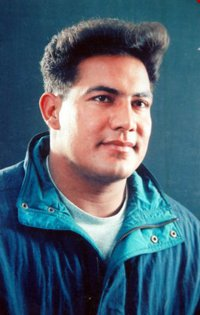

Personal information
- Full name: Harjeet Singh Brar
- Nickname: Bajakhana
- Nationality: Indian
- Born: 5 September 1971 Village Bajakhana, Faridkot district, Punjab
- Died: 16 April 1998 (aged 26) Near Morinda, Punjab, India
- Spouse: Narinderjit Kaur

Sport
- Country: India
- Sport: Kabaddi
- Team: India

Harjeet Singh Brar also known as Bajakhana (5 September 1971 – 16 April 1998) was a professional kabaddi player. He was a Raider in circle style kabaddi. Harjeet Brar was born in Bajakhana village in Faridkot, Punjab. His life ended when he died in a car crash accident.

== Personal life ==
He was a big kid with a strong build and stature. Since Kabaddi was immensely popular in rural Punjab at that time, his father, Sardar Bakshish Singh encouraged him to play this sport. He started to play in local tournaments and soon made his presence felt in all the games he played. When Harjit Brar was in 8th standard, he participated in Mini Games at Guwahati and won the tournament. Seeing his determination and grip on the game, he was admitted to Sports college, Jalandhar, Punjab (India) and this is where his professional Kabaddi career took off.

He was married to Narinderjit Kaur and had a daughter, Gagan Harjeet Kaur a year later.

== Kabaddi career ==
He made his international debut in 1994, when he came to play in Canada. His redoubtable qualities and the respect he showed for opponents soon made him a popular figure. Harjit Bajakhana became a synonym to Kabaddi. During the final of 1996 Kabaddi World Cup, prize money of one lakh Rupees was awarded for his single winning raid. At one time in Canada, his one raid attracted a bet of $35,000.00. Such was his stature.

== Death ==
On 16 April 1998, Harjeet Brar Bajakhana was killed in a tragic road accident along with three other prominent Kabbadi players, Talwar Kaonke, Kewal Lopoke and Kewal Sekha. Sukhchain Singh of Sidhwan Kalan village sustained serious injuries and was admitted to PGI. Following his treatment he was discharged from the hospital. According to their family members, Kabaddi players were on their way to New Delhi to acquire visas for their travel abroad. They were travelling on the Kharar-Morinda stretch of National Highway 95, in a Gypsy bearing registration number PB-10-U-0097. The accident took place near the town of Morinda, when a truck bearing registration number HR-35-2371, collided head on with their vehicle. It led to the killing of four of them on the spot and seriously injuring the fifth occupant. All four Kabaddi players were brought to a Kharar Hospital. Following the post-mortem examination, their bodies were subsequently released to their relatives. Harjit Bajakhana's death brought an abrupt end of an era. Harjeet Bajakhana had achieved what no other Kabaddi player could.
