= Chahal (village) =

Village in Punjab, India

- Village
- Location in Punjab, India
- Coordinates: 30.676°N 74.789°E
- Country: India
- State: Punjab
- District: Faridkot

Government
  - Type: Sarpanch
  - Body: Gram panchayat

Population (2011)
  - Total: 4,375

Languages
  - Official: Punjabi
- Time zone: UTC+5:30 (IST)
- Postal code: 151203
- Vehicle registration: PB
- Nearest city: Faridkot

Chahal is a village located in Faridkot district of Punjab, India.

== Demographics ==
The Village has a population of 4376 of which 2334 are males while 2041 are females as per the census of 2011. Total geographical area of the village is about 1237 hectares according to census of 2011.
