= Bhana, Faridkot =

Village in Punjab, India

Bhana
- Village
- Interactive map of Bhana
- Coordinates: 30.678664°N 74.830051°E
- Country: India
- State: Punjab
- District: Faridkot

Government
  - Type: Sarpanch
  - Body: Gram panchayat

Population (2011)
  - Total: 3,523

Languages
  - Official: Punjabi
- Time zone: UTC+5:30 (IST)
- Postal code: 151209
- Vehicle registration: PB
- Nearest city: Faridkot

Bhana (Punjabi: ਭਾਣਾ) is a village located in the Faridkot district in the Indian state of Punjab. The village has population of 3523 of which 1870 are males while 1653 are females as per Population Census 2011. The postal code of the village is 151209.
