= Buttar (Faridkot district) =

Village in Punjab, India

Buttar ਬੁੱਟਰ
- Village
- Interactive map of Buttar
- Coordinates: 30.775639°N 74.561362°E
- Country: India
- State: Punjab
- District: Faridkot

Government
  - Type: Sarpanch
  - Body: Gram panchayat

Population (2011)
  - Total: 641

Languages
  - Official: Punjabi
- Time zone: UTC+5:30 (IST)
- Postal code: 151212
- Vehicle registration: PB
- Nearest city: Faridkot

Buttar (Punjabi: ਬੁੱਟਰ) is a village in Faridkot district of Punjab, India.

== Demographics ==
In 2011, Buttar had 641 people, of which 329 were males and 312 were females. Its postal code is 151212. Its geographical area in 2011 was 316 hectares.
