= Hassan Bhatti =

Village in Punjab, India

Hassan Bhatti ਹੱਸਣ ਭੱਟੀ
- Village
- Interactive map of Hassan Bhatti
- Coordinates: 30.809245°N 74.744235°E
- Country: India
- State: Punjab
- District: Faridkot

Government
  - Type: Sarpanch
  - Body: Gram panchayat

Population (2011)
  - Total: 1,520

Languages
  - Official: Punjabi
- Time zone: UTC+5:30 (IST)
- Postal code: 142052
- Vehicle registration: PB04
- Nearest city: Faridkot

Hassan Bhatti (Punjabi: ਹੱਸਣ ਭੱਟੀ) is a village located in Faridkot district of Punjab State. The Village has a population of 1520 of which 803 are males while 717 are females as per the population census of 2011. The postal code of the village is 142052. The total geographical area of the village is about 702 hectares.
