= Bihlewala =

Village in Punjab, India

Bihlewala ਬੀਹਲੇਵਾਲਾ
- village
- Location in Punjab, India Bihlewala (India)
- Coordinates: 30.67285°N 74.60142°E
- Country: India
- State: Punjab
- Region: Punjab
- District: Faridkot district

Population (2011)
  - Total: 2,205

Languages
  - Official: Punjabi (Gurmukhi)
  - Regional: Punjabi
- Time zone: UTC+5:30 (IST)
- PIN: 151203
- Nearest city: Faridkot

Bihlewala is a village located in the Faridkot district of Punjab.
