= Faridkot (rural) =

Village in Punjab, India

- Rural Population on the Outskirts of City
- Location in Punjab, India Faridkot (rural) (India)
- Coordinates: 30.649550°N 74.773267°E

Government
  - Type: Gram-Panchayat

Population (2011)
  - Total: 11,200

Languages
  - Official: Punjabi
- Time zone: UTC+5:30 (IST)
- PIN: 151203
- Telephone code: +91-

Faridkot (rural) is the largest village of Faridkot district located on the outskirts of the Faridkot City. According to the 2011 census, Faridkot had a population of 11,200. Its postal code is 151203.
