= Kot Sukhia =

Village in Punjab, India

Kot Sukhia ਕੋਟ ਸੁਖੀਆ
- Village
- Location in Punjab, India Kot Sukhia (India)
- Coordinates: 30.681482°N 74.876044°E
- Country: India
- States: Punjab
- District: Faridkot

Government
  - Type: Gram Panchayat
  - Body: Sarpanch

Languages
  - official: Punjabi (Gurmukhi)
- Time zone: UTC+5:30 (IST)
- PIN: 151207
- Nearest city: Faridkot

Kot Sukhia is a village located in Faridkot district of Punjab, India.

== Demographics ==
As per the population census of 2011, the village has population of 4856 of which 2590 are males while 2266 were females. The geographical area of village is about 1468 Hectares. The Postal code of village is 151207. The nearest railway station is Giani Zail Singh Sandhwan which is about 10 kilometers away.
