= Kabalwala =

Village in Faridkot, Punjab, India

Kabalwala ਕਾਬਲਵਾਲਾ
- Village
- Interactive map of Kabalwala
- Coordinates: 30.820144°N 74.715897°E
- Country: India
- State: Punjab
- District: Faridkot

Government
  - Type: Sarpanch
  - Body: Gram panchayat

Population (2011)
  - Total: 1,444

Languages
  - Official: Punjabi
- Time zone: UTC+5:30 (IST)
- Postal code: 151203
- Nearest city: Faridkot, India

Kabalwala (Punjabi: ਕਾਬਲਵਾਲਾ) is a village located in Faridkot district of Punjab State. The village has a population of 1,444 of which 766 are males while 678 are females as per the population census of 2011. The total geographical area of the village is about 336 hectares with 275 households. The postal code of the village is 151203.
