= Bhagthala Kalan =

Village in Punjab, India

Bhagthala Kalan ਭਾਗਥਲਾ ਕਲਾਂ
- Village
- Interactive map of Bhagthala Kalan
- Coordinates: 30.775579°N 74.788957°E
- Country: India
- State: Punjab
- District: Faridkot

Government
  - Type: Sarpanch
  - Body: Gram panchayat

Population (2011)
  - Total: 1,478

Languages
  - Official: Punjabi
- Time zone: UTC+5:30 (IST)
- Postal code: 151213
- Vehicle registration: PB
- Nearest city: Faridkot

Bhagthala Kalan (Punjabi: ਭਾਗਥਲਾ ਕਲਾਂ) is a village located in Faridkot district of Punjab State. The Village has a population of 1478 of which 765 are males while 713 are females as per the population census of 2011. The postal code of the village is 151213. The total geographical area of the village is about 747 hectares.
