= Dana Romana =

Village in Punjab, India

- Village
- Interactive map of Dana Romana
- Coordinates: 30.617°N 74.679°E
- Country: India
- State: Punjab
- District: Faridkot

Government
  - Type: Sarpanch
  - Body: Gram panchayat

Population (2011)
  - Total: 1,245

Languages
  - Official: Punjabi
- Time zone: UTC+5:30 (IST)
- Postal code: 151213
- Vehicle registration: PB
- Nearest city: Faridkot

Dana Romana is a village located in Faridkot district of Punjab State.

== Demographics ==
The Village has a population of 1245 of which 644 are males while 601 are females as per the population census of 2011. The total geographical area of the village is about 434 hectares.
