= Deep Singh Wala =

Village in Punjab, India

- Village
- Location in Punjab, India
- Coordinates: 30.743°N 74.480°E
- Country: India
- State: Punjab
- District: Faridkot

Government
  - Type: Sarpanch
  - Body: Gram panchayat

Population (2011)
  - Total: 4,190

Languages
  - Official: Punjabi
- Time zone: UTC+5:30 (IST)
- Postal code: 151212
- Vehicle registration: PB
- Nearest city: Guruharsahai, Faridkot
- Governing body: Gram panchayat

Deep Singh Wala is a village located in the Faridkot district in the Indian state of Punjab.

== Demographics ==
As per the 2011 census, the village has a population of 4,190, comprising 2,204 males and 1,986 females. Total geographical area of the village is about 1643 hectares according to census of 2011.
