= Pipli (Faridkot district) =

Village in Punjab, India

Pipli ਪਿਪਲੀ
- Village
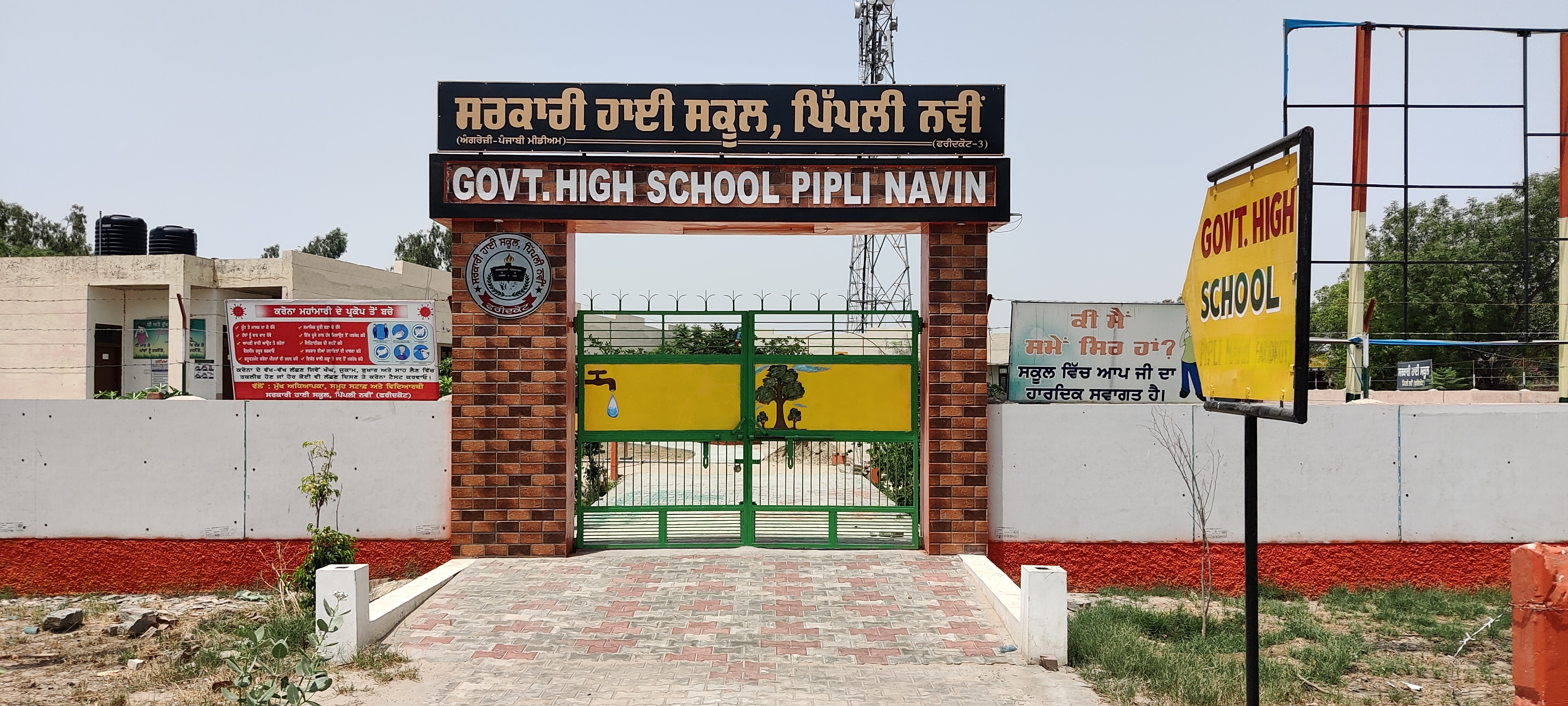
- Interactive map of Pipli
- Coordinates: 30.730498606686066°N 74.73072184444267°E
- Country: India
- State: Punjab
- District: Faridkot

Government
  - Body: Gram panchayat

Population (2011)
  - Total: 3,938

Languages
  - Official: Punjabi
- Time zone: UTC+5:30 (IST)
- Postal code: 151213
- Vehicle registration: PB 04
- Nearest city: Faridkot

Pipli (Punjabi: ਪਿਪਲੀ) is a village located in the Faridkot district in the Indian state of Punjab. The Village is divided in two sections afterwards, named as Pipli Navi and Pipli Purani means new pipli and old pipli, respectively.

== Demographics ==
The Village has a population of 3968 of which 2089 are males while 1879 are females as per the census of 2011. Total geographical area of the village is about 1,371 hectares. The postal code of the village is 151213.

== Schools ==
- GHS Pipli Navi
- GPS Pipli Purani
