= Jhotiwala =

Village in Punjab, India

Jhotiwala ਝੋਟੀਵਾਲਾ
- Village
- Interactive map of Jhotiwala
- Coordinates: 30.72809°N 74.64431°E
- Country: India
- State: Punjab
- District: Faridkot

Government
  - Type: Sarpanch
  - Body: Gram panchayat

Population (2011)
  - Total: 2,105

Languages
  - Official: Punjabi
- Time zone: UTC+5:30 (IST)
- Postal code: 151203
- Vehicle registration: PB04
- Nearest city: Faridkot

Jhotiwala (Punjabi: ਝੋਟੀਵਾਲਾ) is a village in Faridkot district in the Indian state of Punjab. The village has a population of 2105 of which 1087 are males while 1018 are females as per the population census of 2011. The postal code of the village is 151203. The total geographical area of the village is about 961 hectares.
