= Dod, Faridkot =

Village in Punjab, India

Dod ਡੋਡ
- Village
- Interactive map of Dod
- Coordinates: 30.472031°N 75.016362°E
- Country: India
- State: Punjab
- District: Faridkot

Government
  - Body: Gram panchayat

Population (2011)
  - Total: 4,832

Languages
  - Official: Punjabi
- Time zone: UTC+5:30 (IST)
- Postal code: 151205
- Vehicle registration: PB
- Nearest city: Kotkapura

Dod (Punjabi: ਡੋਡ) is a village located in the Jaito tehsil of Faridkot district in the Indian state of Punjab.

== Demographics ==
The Village has a population of 4,832 of which 2,520 are males while 2,312 are females as per the census of 2011. The postal code of the village is 151205. Total geographical area of the village is about 1232 hectares according to census of 2011.

== Facilities ==
- Government Primary School (Main)
- Government Primary School (Budhigar Basti)
- Government High School (Ramsa)
- Cooperative Society
- Punjab and Sind Bank (with A.T.M.)
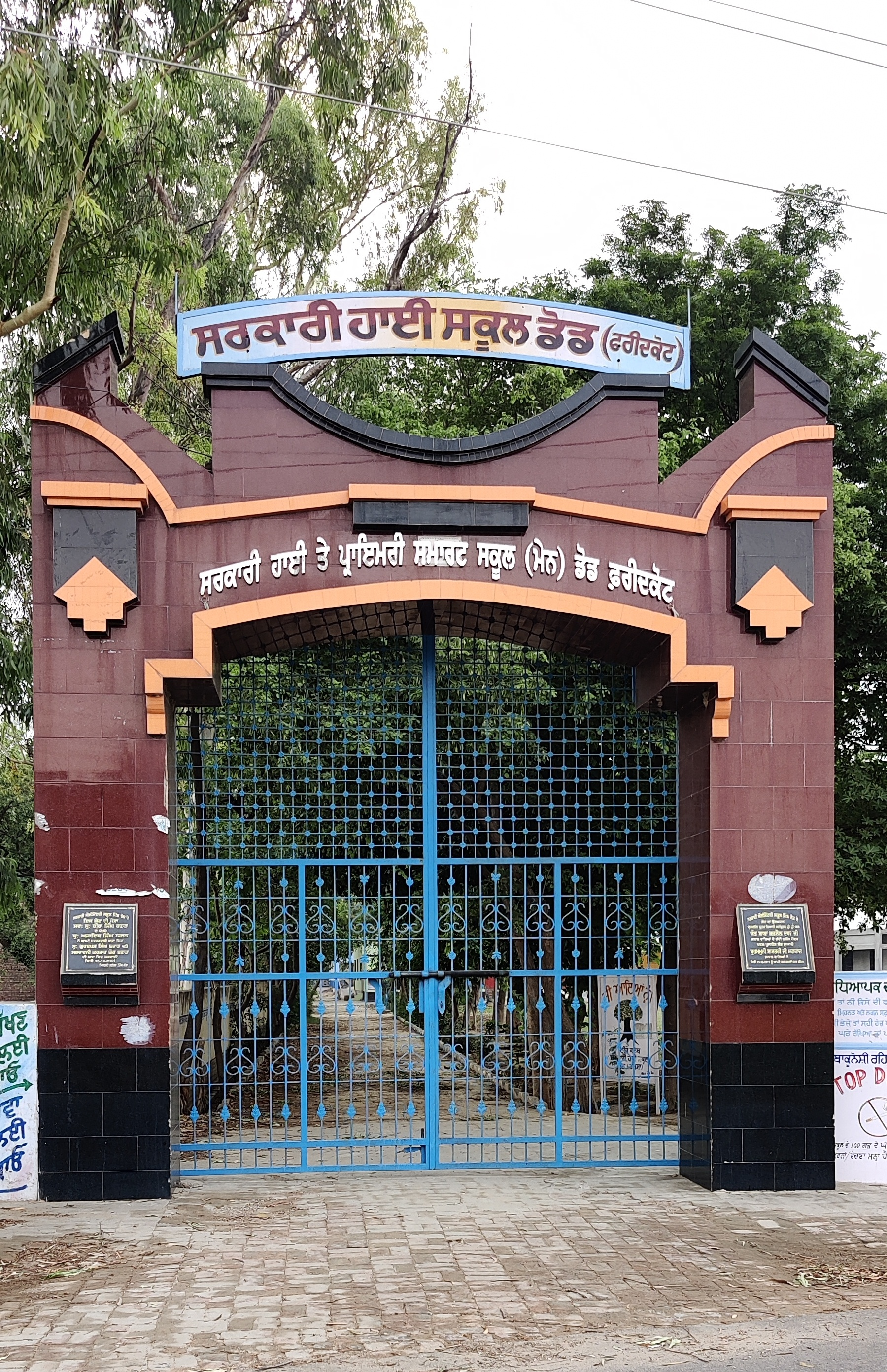
  Main Entrance of Govt. High and Govt. Primary School, Dod, Faridkot.

== Religious places ==
- Gurudwara Harsar Sahib (Located in the middle of the village)
- Gurudwara Dhaulsar Sahib (Located on Bajakhana - Barnala Road)
- Dera Baba Lahia (Located on Maluka Road)

== Clubs ==
- FC DOD (Football Club of Dod)
- Youth Club Dodd
- Sukhmani Netradan Club Dod
- School Welfare Trust
