= Lambwali =

Village in Faridkot, Punjab, India

Lambwali ਲੰਬਵਾਲੀ
- Village
- Interactive map of Lambwali
- Coordinates: 30.476213°N 74.987698°E
- Country: India
- State: Punjab
- District: Faridkot

Government
  - Type: Sarpanch
  - Body: Gram panchayat

Population (2011)
  - Total: 2,719

Languages
  - Official: Punjabi
- Time zone: UTC+5:30 (IST)
- Postal code: 151202
- Nearest city: Kotkapura

Lambwali (Punjabi: ਲੰਬਵਾਲੀ) is a village located in Faridkot district of Punjab State. The Village has a population of 2719 of which 1472 are males while 1247 are females as per the population census of 2011. The total geographical area of the village is about 643 hectares with 508 households. The postal code of the village is 151202.
