= Hardialeana =

Village in Faridkot, Punjab, India

Hardialeana ਹਰਦਿਆਲੇਆਣਾ
- Village
- Interactive map of Hardialeana
- Coordinates: 30.768546001665076°N 74.74143372432485°E
- Country: India
- State: Punjab
- District: Faridkot

Government
  - Type: Sarpanch
  - Body: Gram panchayat

Population (2011)
  - Total: 1,378

Languages
  - Official: Punjabi
- Time zone: UTC+5:30 (IST)
- Postal code: 151203
- Nearest city: Faridkot

Hardialeana (Punjabi: ਹਰਦਿਆਲੇਆਣਾ) is a village located in Faridkot district of Punjab state. The village has a population of 1,378 of which 707 are males while 671 are females as per the population census of 2011. The total geographical area of the village is about 852 hectares. The postal code of the village is 151203.
