= Wander Jatana =

Village in Faridkot, Punjab, India

- Village
- Interactive map of Wander Jatana
- Coordinates: 30.569087210468215°N 74.73632915924296°E
- Country: India
- State: Punjab
- District: Faridkot

Government
  - Type: Sarpanch
  - Body: Gram panchayat

Population (2011)
  - Total: 4,877

Languages
  - Official: Punjabi
- Time zone: UTC+5:30 (IST)
- Postal code: 151209
- Nearest city: Kotkapura, Faridkot

Wander Jatana is a village located in Faridkot district of Punjab State.

== History ==
The village was established around year 1700 by the clan (Wander). The reason is said to be the famous railway crossing (fatak) of Kotkapura, as it interrupted the daily movement of (Wanders) from Kotkapura to their fields (Today Wander Jatana), so the clan established a village in their fields named (Wander). Later on marrying the daughter of (Jatana) clan, the Jatana clan was given residence in the village and the village was renamed as Wander Jatana.

== Demographics ==
The Village has a population of 4877 of which 2623 are males while 2254 are females as per the population census of 2011. The total geographical area of the village is about 1,386 hectares with 992 number of households. The postal code of the village is 151209.
