= Sukhanwala =

Village in Punjab, India

Sukhan wala ਸੁੱਖਣ ਵਾਲਾ
- Village
- Location in Punjab, India
- Country: India
- States: Punjab
- District: Faridkot

Government
  - Type: Gram Panchayat
  - Body: Sarpanch

Languages
  - official: Punjabi (Gurmukhi)
- Time zone: UTC+5:30 (IST)
- PIN: 151212
- Nearest city: Faridkot

Sukhanwala (Punjabi: ਸੁੱਖਣਵਾਲਾ) is a village in Faridkot district of Punjab, India. A School branch of Akal Academy Baru Sahib is also located in this village.

| District Nearest | Post Office | Pin Code | Population | Area | Nearest City | Police station |
|---|---|---|---|---|---|---|
| Faridkot | Sukhan wala | 151203 | 3,187 | 1576.71 hectares | Faridkot | Sadar Police Station, Faridkot |

== Main Places ==
- Government Primary School (Main)
- Senior Secondary School
- Akal Academy Sukhanwala
- Cooperative Society

=== Religious places ===
==== Gurudwara Kalgidhar Sahib ====
Gurudwara Kalgidhar Sahib is located outside the village near the grain market.

==== Dera Baba Thakur Das ====
This Dera is located right in the middle of the village.

== Clubs ==
- Baba Thakur Das Sports Club
- Sri Guru Har Gobind Wrestling Club
- Shaheed Bhagat Singh Club
