= Beguwala =

- Village
- Interactive map of Beguwala
- Coordinates: 30.762161°N 74.659413°E
- Country: India
- State: Punjab
- District: Faridkot

Government
  - Body: Gram panchayat

Population (2011)
  - Total: 1,469

Languages
  - Official: Punjabi
- Time zone: UTC+5:30 (IST)
- Postal code: 151213
- Vehicle registration: PB
- Nearest city: Faridkot

Beguwala (Punjabi: ਬੇਗੂਵਾਲਾ) is a village located in the Faridkot district in Punjab, India. The Village has a population of 1469 as per the population census of 2011. The postal code of the village is 151213.
