= Mishriwala =

- village
- Location in Punjab, India Mishriwala (India)
- Coordinates: 30.733304°N 74.838447°E
- Country: India
- State: Punjab
- District: Faridkot district

Area
  - Total: 1 km^{2} (0.39 sq mi)

Languages
  - Official: Punjabi
- Time zone: UTC+5:30 (IST)
- PIN: 1
- Telephone code: +91-

Mishriwala is a village located in Faridkot district, Punjab, India.

== Demographics ==
The population of this village is 659 according to the 2011 census. The population of women is lesser than that of men.

== Education ==
The village has a primary, secondary and nursery (known as aanganvari) level schools all located jointly. Bharat Bhushan is the principal of the primary school. The primary school has a staff of two who handle all the five classes.

== Transportation ==
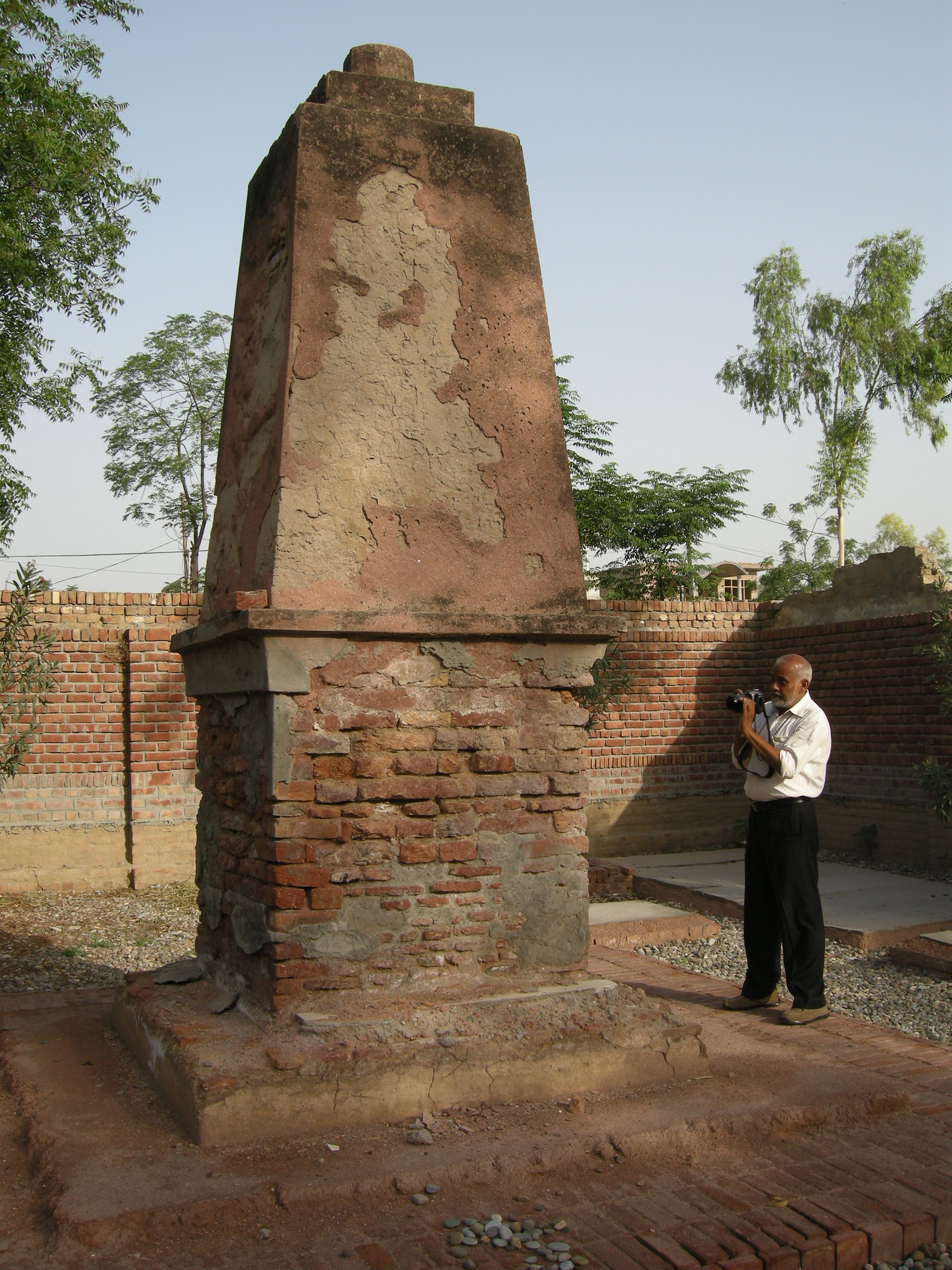
The Anglo-Sikh War Memorial at Mishriwala

The village is well-connected to its neighboring villages Moran Wali, Mandwala, Ghumiara and Chandbaja. It is connected to the following cities and villages by road.

Name of the place	Distance (in km)
Ghumiara	2 km
Chandbaja	2 km
Moran Wali	3.2 km
National Highway 15	1.5 km
Kaler	4 km
Faridkot	15 km

There are two buses which come after every 30 minutes. The village is not connected to other villages by tempos.

== Sports and health ==
The village has a gym located near the Sath of the village. It has exercise machines, weights and dumbbells. The village organizes a volleyball tournament each year. It has a well-operating volleyball ground. The players from nearby villages daily come to play here and also participate in the volleyball tournament. it has many interested children.
