= Maur, Faridkot =

Village in Faridkot district of Punjab, India

Maur ਮੌੜ
- Village
- Interactive map of Maur
- Coordinates: 30.503761°N 74.748288°E
- Country: India
- State: Punjab
- District: Faridkot

Government
  - Body: Gram panchayat

Population (2011)
  - Total: 3,228

Languages
  - Official: Punjabi
- Time zone: UTC+5:30 (IST)
- Postal code: 151204
- Vehicle registration: PB
- Nearest city: Kotkapura

Maur (Punjabi: ਮੌੜ) is a village located in the Faridkot district in the Indian state of Punjab.

== Demographics ==
The Village has a population of 3228 of which 1736 are males while 1492 are females as per the census of 2011. Total geographical area of the village is about 1007 hectares. The postal code of the village is 151204.

== Education ==
- Govt. High School.
