= Burj Masta =

Village in Punjab, India

- Village
- Interactive map of Burj Masta
- Coordinates: 30.729°N 74.673°E
- Country: India
- State: Punjab
- District: Faridkot

Government
  - Type: Sarpanch
  - Body: Gram panchayat

Population (2011)
  - Total: 735

Languages
  - Official: Punjabi
- Time zone: UTC+5:30 (IST)
- Postal code: 151213
- Vehicle registration: PB
- Nearest city: Faridkot

Burj Masta is a village located in Faridkot district of Punjab, India. The Village has a population of 735 as per the population census of 2011. The population of village raised to 1531 in year 2020. The total geographical area of the village is about 339 hectares according to Indian census of 2011.
