= Ratti Rori =

Village in Faridkot, Punjab, India

Ratti Rori ਰੱਤੀ ਰੋੜੀ
- Village
- Interactive map of Ratti Rori
- Coordinates: 30.620814°N 74.702997°E
- Country: India
- State: Punjab
- District: Faridkot

Government
  - Type: Sarpanch
  - Body: Gram panchayat

Population (2011)
  - Total: 1,465

Languages
  - Official: Punjabi
- Time zone: UTC+5:30 (IST)
- Postal code: 151203
- Vehicle registration: PB04
- Nearest city: Faridkot

Ratti Rori (Punjabi: ਰੱਤੀ ਰੋੜੀ) is a village located in Faridkot district of Punjab State. The village has a population of 1,465 of which 780 are males while 685 are females as per the population census of 2011. The postal code of the village is 151203. The total geographical area of the village is about 929 hectares.
