= Machaki Kalan =

Village in Punjab, India

- village
- Interactive map of Machaki Kalan
- Coordinates: 30.691142°N 74.664974°E
- Country: India
- State: Punjab
- District: Faridkot

Government
  - Body: Gram panchayat

Population (2011)
  - Total: 3,491

Languages
  - Official: Punjabi
- Time zone: UTC+5:30 (IST)
- Postal code: 151212
- Vehicle registration: PB
- Nearest city: Faridkot

Machaki Kalan (Punjabi: ਮਚਾਕੀ ਕਲਾਂ) is a village located in the Faridkot district in the Indian state of Punjab. The village has a population of 3,491 of which 1,868 are males while 1,623 are females as per the census of 2011. The postal code of the village is 151212.
