= Virewala Kalan =

Village in Faridkot, Punjab, India

Virewala Kalan ਵੀਰੇਵਾਲਾ ਕਲਾਂ
- Village
- Interactive map of Virewala Kalan
- Coordinates: 30.676005°N 74.528357°E
- Country: India
- State: Punjab
- District: Faridkot

Government
  - Type: Sarpanch
  - Body: Gram panchayat

Population (2011)
  - Total: 1,139

Languages
  - Official: Punjabi
- Time zone: UTC+5:30 (IST)
- Postal code: 151203
- Vehicle registration: PB04
- Nearest city: Faridkot

Virewala Kalan (Punjabi: ਵੀਰੇ ਵਾਲਾ ਕਲਾਂ) is a village located in Faridkot district of Punjab State. The Village has a population of 1139 of which 598 are males while 541 are females as per the population census of 2011. The postal code of the village is 151203. The total geographical area of the village is about 428 hectares.
