= Burj Jawahar Singh Wala =

Village in Faridkot, Punjab, India

Burj Jawahar Singh Wala ਬੁਰਜ ਜਵਾਹਰ ਸਿੰਘ ਵਾਲਾ
- Village
- Interactive map of Burj Jawahar Singh Wala
- Coordinates: 30.535909485789567°N 74.98662474462333°E
- Country: India
- State: Punjab
- District: Faridkot

Government
  - Type: Sarpanch
  - Body: Gram panchayat

Population (2011)
  - Total: 1,628

Languages
  - Official: Punjabi
- Time zone: UTC+5:30 (IST)
- Postal code: 151202
- Nearest city: Faridkot

Burj Jawahar Singh Wala (Punjabi: ਬੁਰਜ ਜਵਾਹਰ ਸਿੰਘ ਵਾਲਾ) is a village located in Jaito tehsil of Faridkot district of Punjab State. The Village has a population of 1628 of which 861 are males while 767 are females as per the population census of 2011. The total geographical area of the village is about 1,362 hectares. The postal code of the village is 151202.
