= Arayianwala Khurd =

Village in Punjab, India

- Village
- Location in Punjab, India Arayianwala Khurd (India)
- Coordinates: 30.781388°N 74.550165°E

Population (2011)
  - Total: 876

Languages
  - Official: Punjabi
- Time zone: UTC+5:30 (IST)
- PIN: 151204
- Telephone code: +91-
- Nearest cities: Sadiq, Guru Har Sahai

Arayianwala Khurd (Punjabi: ਅਰਾਈਆਂਵਾਲਾ ਖੁਰਦ) is a village located in Faridkot district in Punjab, India. The nearest town is Guru Har Sahai, which is about 17 kilometers away.
