= Ghoniwala =

Village in Faridkot, Punjab, India

Ghoniwala ਘੋਨੀਵਾਲਾ
- Village
- Interactive map of Ghoniwala
- Coordinates: 30.807974°N 74.659912°E
- Country: India
- State: Punjab
- District: Faridkot

Government
  - Type: Sarpanch
  - Body: Gram panchayat

Population (2011)
  - Total: 407

Languages
  - Official: Punjabi
- Time zone: UTC+5:30 (IST)
- Postal code: 151203
- Nearest city: Faridkot

Ghoniwala (Punjabi: ਘੋਨੀਵਾਲਾ) is a small village located in Faridkot district of Punjab State. The Village has a population of 407 of which 209 are males while 198 are females as per the population census of 2011. The total geographical area of the village is about 146 hectares. The postal code of the village is 151203.
