= Behbal khurd =

Village in Faridkot district, Punjab, India

Behbal khurd ਬਹਿਬਲ ਖੁਰਦ
- Village
- Interactive map of Behbal khurd
- Coordinates: 30.501603°N 74.911823°E
- Country: India
- State: Punjab
- District: Faridkot

Government
  - Type: Sarpanch
  - Body: Gram panchayat

Population (2011)
  - Total: 2,588

Languages
  - Official: Punjabi
- Time zone: UTC+5:30 (IST)
- Postal code: 151208
- Nearest city: Kotkapura

Behbal khurd (Punjabi: ਬਹਿਬਲ ਖੁਰਦ) is a village located in Jaito tehsil of Faridkot district of Punjab State. The Village has a population of 2588 of which 1346 are males while 1242 are females as per the population census of 2011. The postal code of the village is 151208. The total geographical area of the village is about 726 hectares.
