= Qila Nau =

Village in Faridkot, Punjab, India

Qila Nau ਕਿਲਾ ਨੌ
- Village
- Nickname: Nawan Qila
- Interactive map of Qila Nau
- Coordinates: 30.653546°N 74.704692°E
- Country: India
- State: Punjab
- District: Faridkot

Government
  - Type: Sarpanch
  - Body: Gram panchayat

Population (2011)
  - Total: 4,472

Languages
  - Official: Punjabi
- Time zone: UTC+5:30 (IST)
- Postal code: 151213
- Vehicle registration: PB04
- Nearest city: Faridkot

Qila Nau (Punjabi: ਕਿਲਾ ਨੌ) is a village located in Faridkot district of Punjab State.

== Demographics ==
The Village has a population of 4472 of which 2340 are males while 2132 are females as per the population census of 2011. The postal code of the village is 151213. The total geographical area of the village is about 1,948 hectares.
