= Mumara =

Village in Punjab, India

Coordinates: 30°47′33″N 74°35′22″E

Mumara (Punjabi: ਮੁਮਾਰਾ) is a village located in Faridkot district of Punjab State. The village has a population of 1,323 of which 691 are males while 632 are females as per the population census of 2011. The total geographical area of the village is about 535 hectares. The postal code of the village is 151203.
