= Bholuwala, Faridkot =

Village in Punjab, India

Bholuwala
- Village
- ਭੋਲੂਵਾਲਾ
- Location in Punjab, India Bholuwala (India)
- Coordinates: 30°43′24″N 74°46′42″E
- Country: India
- State: Punjab
- District: Faridkot district

Government
  - Type: Gram Panchayat

Population (2011)
  - Total: 1,067

Languages
  - Official: Punjabi
- Time zone: UTC+5:30 (IST)
- PIN: 151203

Bholuwala is a village in Faridkot district of Punjab, India.

== Demographics ==
According to the 2011 Census of India, Bholuwala's population was 1,067, with 552 males and 515 females.
