= Pakhi Kalan =

Village in Faridkot district of Punjab, India

Pakhi Kalan ਪੱਖੀ ਕਲਾਂ
- Village
- Location in Punjab, India Pakhi Kalan (India)
- Coordinates: 30.748916622220168°N 74.75961321903502°E
- Country: India
- States: Punjab
- District: Faridkot

Government
  - Type: Gram Panchayat
  - Body: Sarpanch

Languages
  - official: Punjabi (Gurmukhi)
- Time zone: UTC+5:30 (IST)
- PIN: 151203
- Nearest city: Faridkot

Pakhi Kalan (Punjabi: ਪੱਖੀ ਕਲਾਂ) is a village located in Faridkot district of Punjab, India.

== Demographics ==
As per the population census of 2011, the village has population of 4300 of which 2292 are males while 2008 were females. The geographical area of village is 1691 Hectares/16.91 KM^{2}. The Postal code of village is 151203. The Nearest Railway Station is Pipli-Pakhi Kalan, 3.24 km which is about 3.24 Kilometers away.
