= Daggo Romana =

Village in Punjab, India

- Village
- Interactive map of Daggo Romana
- Coordinates: 30.604°N 74.69°E
- Country: India
- State: Punjab
- District: Faridkot

Government
  - Type: Sarpanch
  - Body: Gram panchayat

Population (2011)
  - Total: 1,420

Languages
  - Official: Punjabi
- Time zone: UTC+5:30 (IST)
- Postal code: 151213
- Vehicle registration: PB
- Nearest city: Faridkot

Daggo Romana is a village located in Faridkot district of Punjab State.

== Demographics ==
The Village has a population of 1420 of which 750 are males while 670 are females as per the population census of 2011. The total geographical area of the village is about 434 hectares.
