= Dhimanwali =

Village in Faridkot, Punjab, India

Dhimanwali ਢੀਮਾਂਵਾਲੀ
- Village
- Interactive map of Dhimanwali
- Coordinates: 30.598960°N 74.737763°E
- Country: India
- State: Punjab
- District: Faridkot

Government
  - Type: Sarpanch
  - Body: Gram panchayat

Population (2011)
  - Total: 2,927

Languages
  - Official: Punjabi
- Time zone: UTC+5:30 (IST)
- Postal code: 151209
- Nearest city: Faridkot

Dhimanwali (Punjabi: ਢੀਮਾਂਵਾਲੀ) is a village located in Kotkapura tehsil of Faridkot district of Punjab State. The Village has a population of 2927 of which 1557 are males while 1370 are females as per the population census of 2011. The total geographical area of the village is about 761 hectares. The postal code of the village is 151209.
