= Machaki Khurd =

Village in Punjab, India

Machaki Khurd ਮਚਾਕੀ ਖੁਰਦ
- Village
- Interactive map of Machaki Khurd
- Coordinates: 30.705940°N 74.674308°E
- Country: India
- State: Punjab
- District: Faridkot

Government
  - Body: Gram panchayat

Population (2011)
  - Total: 3,491

Languages
  - Official: Punjabi
- Time zone: UTC+5:30 (IST)
- Postal code: 151212
- Vehicle registration: PB
- Nearest city: Faridkot

Machaki Khurd (Punjabi: ਮਚਾਕੀ ਖੁਰਦ) is a village located in the Faridkot district in the Indian state of Punjab. The village has a population of 1,185 as per the census of 2011. The pin code of the village is 151212.
