= Chandbaja =

Village in Punjab, India

Chand baja ਚੰਦਬਾਜਾ
- village
- Interactive map of Chand baja
- Coordinates: 30.740884°N 74.862071°E
- Country: India
- State: Punjab
- District: Faridkot

Government
  - Type: Sarpanch
  - Body: Gram panchayat

Population (2011)
  - Total: 2,566

Languages
  - Official: Punjabi
- Time zone: UTC+5:30 (IST)
- Postal code: 151212
- Vehicle registration: PB
- Nearest city: Faridkot

Chandbaja (Punjabi: ਚੰਦਬਾਜਾ) is a village located in the district Faridkot of Punjab, India. The village has a population of 2566 of which 1353 are males while 1213 are females as per the population census of year 2011. The postal code of the village is 151213.
