= Sangatpura =

Village in Faridkot District, Punjab, India

- Village
- Location in Punjab, India Sangatpura (India)
- Coordinates: 30.714656382263286°N 74.54580900620286°E

Government
  - Type: Sarpanch
  - Body: Gram panchayat

Area
  - Total: 522 ha (1,290 acres)

Population (2011)
  - Total: 937
  - Density: 180/km^{2} (465/sq mi)

Languages
  - Official: Punjabi
- Time zone: UTC+5:30 (IST)
- PIN: 151212
- Telephone code: +91-
- Nearest cities: Ghuduwala, Sadiq

Sangatpura (Punjabi: ਸੰਗਤਪੁਰਾ) is a village in Faridkot district of Punjab, India.

== Demographics ==
The population of this village is 937 of which 488 are males while 449 females as per population census of 2011. The total geographical area of village is 360 Hectares/3.6 km^{2}.

== Educational Institutes ==
- Govt. Primary School
