= Chaina, Faridkot =

Village in Punjab, India

Chaina
- Village
- Location in Punjab, India
- Coordinates: 30.421°N 74.841°E
- Country: India
- State: Punjab
- District: Faridkot

Government
  - Type: Sarpanch
  - Body: Gram panchayat

Population (2011)
  - Total: 2,971

Languages
  - Official: Punjabi
- Time zone: UTC+5:30 (IST)
- Postal code: 151202
- Vehicle registration: PB
- Nearest city: Kotkapura

Chaina is a village located in the Jaito tehsil of Faridkot district in the Indian state of Punjab.

== Demographics ==
The Village has a population of 2971 of which 1574 are males while 1397 are females as per the census of 2011. Total geographical area of the village is about 1232 hectares according to census of 2011.
