= Kauni, Faridkot =

Village in Faridkot, Punjab, India

Kauni ਕਾਉਣੀ
- Village
- Interactive map of Kauni
- Coordinates: 30.743311°N 74.543245°E
- Country: India
- State: Punjab
- District: Faridkot

Government
  - Type: Sarpanch
  - Body: Gram panchayat

Population (2011)
  - Total: 3,237

Languages
  - Official: Punjabi
- Time zone: UTC+5:30 (IST)
- Postal code: 151203
- Vehicle registration: PB04
- Nearest city: Faridkot

Kauni (Punjabi: ਕਾਉਣੀ) is a village located in Faridkot district of Punjab State. The Village has a population of 3237 of which 1669 are males while 1568 are females as per the population census of 2011. The postal code of the village is 151203. The total geographical area of the village is about 1,362 hectares.
