= Bargari, Faridkot =

Village in Punjab, India

Bargari, Punjab
- Village
- Interactive map of Bargari, Punjab
- Location in Punjab, India Bargari, Punjab (India)
- Coordinates: 30.521894°N 74.952959°E
- Country: India
- State: Punjab
- District: Faridkot

Government
  - Type: Local Government
  - Body: State Government of Punjab, Government of India

Population (2011)
  - Total: 8,408

Languages
  - Principal: Punjabi,
- Time zone: UTC+5:30 (IST)
- PIN: 151208
- Telephone code: 01635
- Vehicle registration: PB- 04

Bargari is a village in Faridkot district of Punjab.

== Location ==
Bargari is between Kotkapura and the Bathinda stretch of National Highway 54 in Faridkot district of Punjab.

== Nearby cities and towns ==
- Jaitu
- Bathinda
- Kotkapura
- Faridkot
