= Golewala =

Village in Punjab, India

Golewala ਗੋਲੇਵਾਲਾ
- Village
- Interactive map of Golewala
- Coordinates: 30.78671277480459°N 74.70094745811284°E
- Country: India
- State: Punjab
- District: Faridkot

Government
  - Type: Sarpanch
  - Body: Gram panchayat

Population (2011)
  - Total: 6,100

Languages
  - Official: Punjabi
- Time zone: UTC+5:30 (IST)
- Postal code: 151213
- Vehicle registration: PB
- Nearest city: Faridkot

Golewala (Punjabi: ਗੋਲੇਵਾਲਾ) is a village located in the Faridkot district in the Indian state of Punjab.

== Demographics ==
The Village has a population of 6100 as per the population census of 2011. The postal code of the village is 151213. Total geographical area of the village is about 2595 hectares according to census of 2011.

Golewala Village Census Data
Particulars	Male	Female	Total
Total No. of Houses	--	--	1072
Population	3174	2926	6100
Schedule Caste	1035	924	1959
Literacy	70.12 %	64.43 %	67.38 %
Total Workers	1815	222	2,037
Area of Village	2,595 Hectares		
