= Pindi Balochan =

Village in Punjab, India

- Village
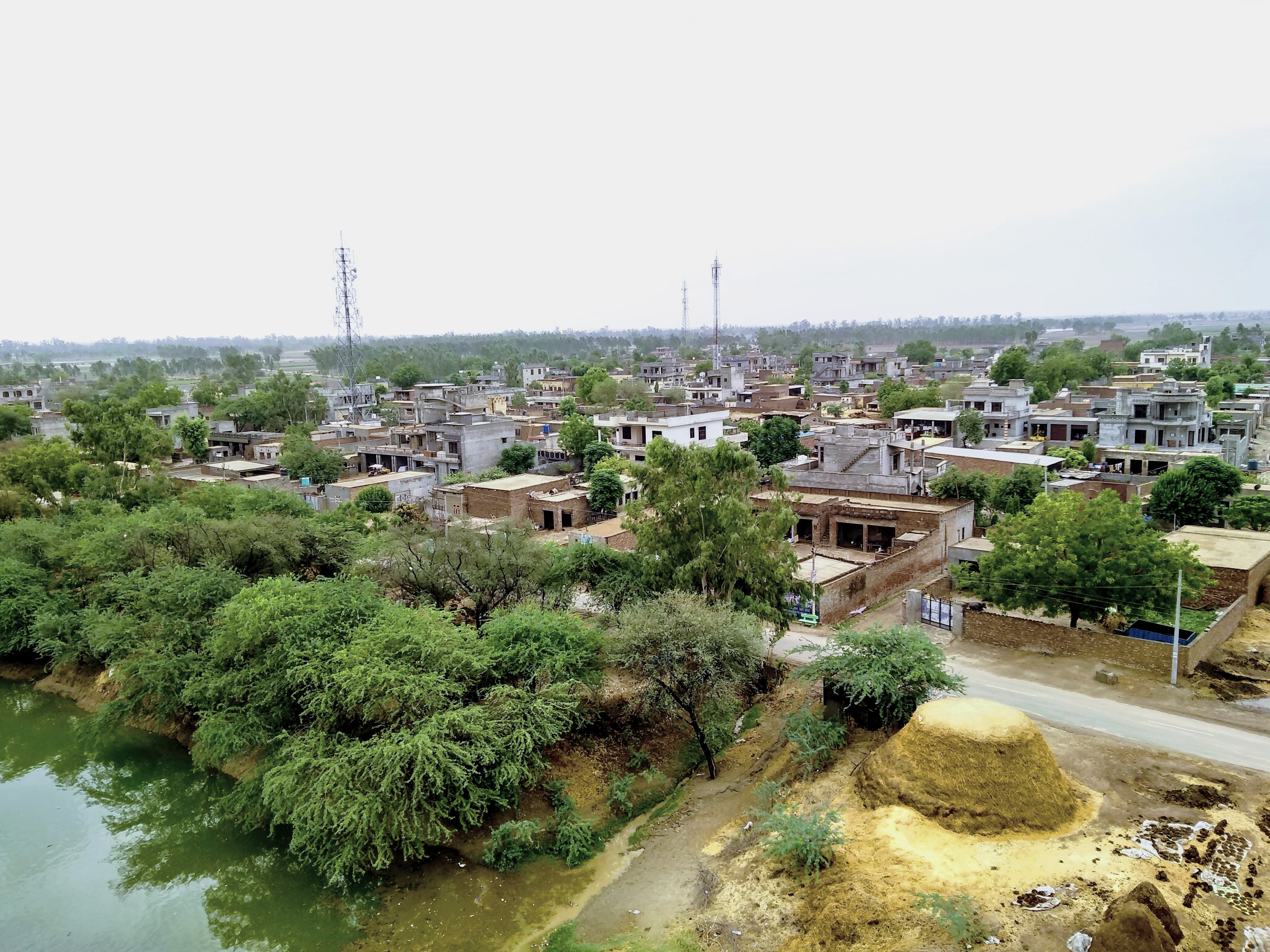
- View from water tower

- Location in Punjab, India Pindi Balochan (India)
- Coordinates: 30°41′16″N 74°30′03″E
- Country: India
- State: Punjab
- District: Faridkot

Government
  - Body: Gram Panchayat

Area
  - Total: 10.77 km^{2} (4.16 sq mi)

Population (2011)
  - Total: 1,632
  - Density: 151.5/km^{2} (392.5/sq mi)

Languages
  - Official: Punjabi
- Time zone: UTC+5:30 (IST)
- Postal code: 151212
- Nearest city: Guruharsahi

Pindi Balochan is a village in Faridkot district of Punjab (India). It is situated on the outskirts of Faridkot, Muktsar and Ferozepur three districts. The village Pindi belongs to tehsil Faridkot.

== Demographics ==
The area of village is 1077 hectares, according to the 2011 census the total population of this village was 1632. The post office near this village is situated 3 kilometers away, PIN code is 151212. The nearest railway station is Guru Harsahai. The Gang canal passes through this village which goes to Rajasthan. A branch of HDFC Bank is also situated in the village. There is one government elementary school and two private schools named Navyug Public School and Taj Public School are in the village.

== Gallery ==
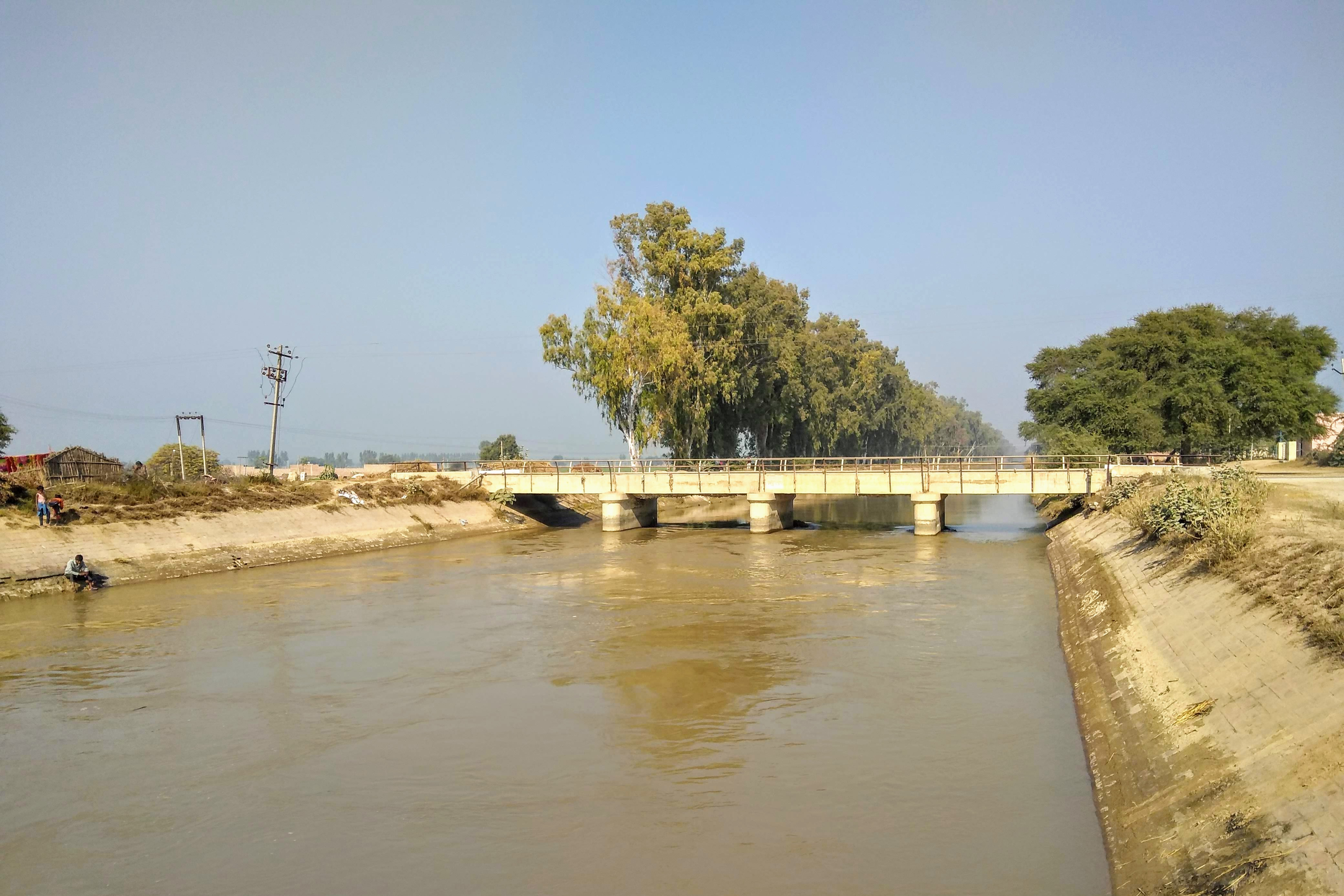
Gang canal in village (2018)

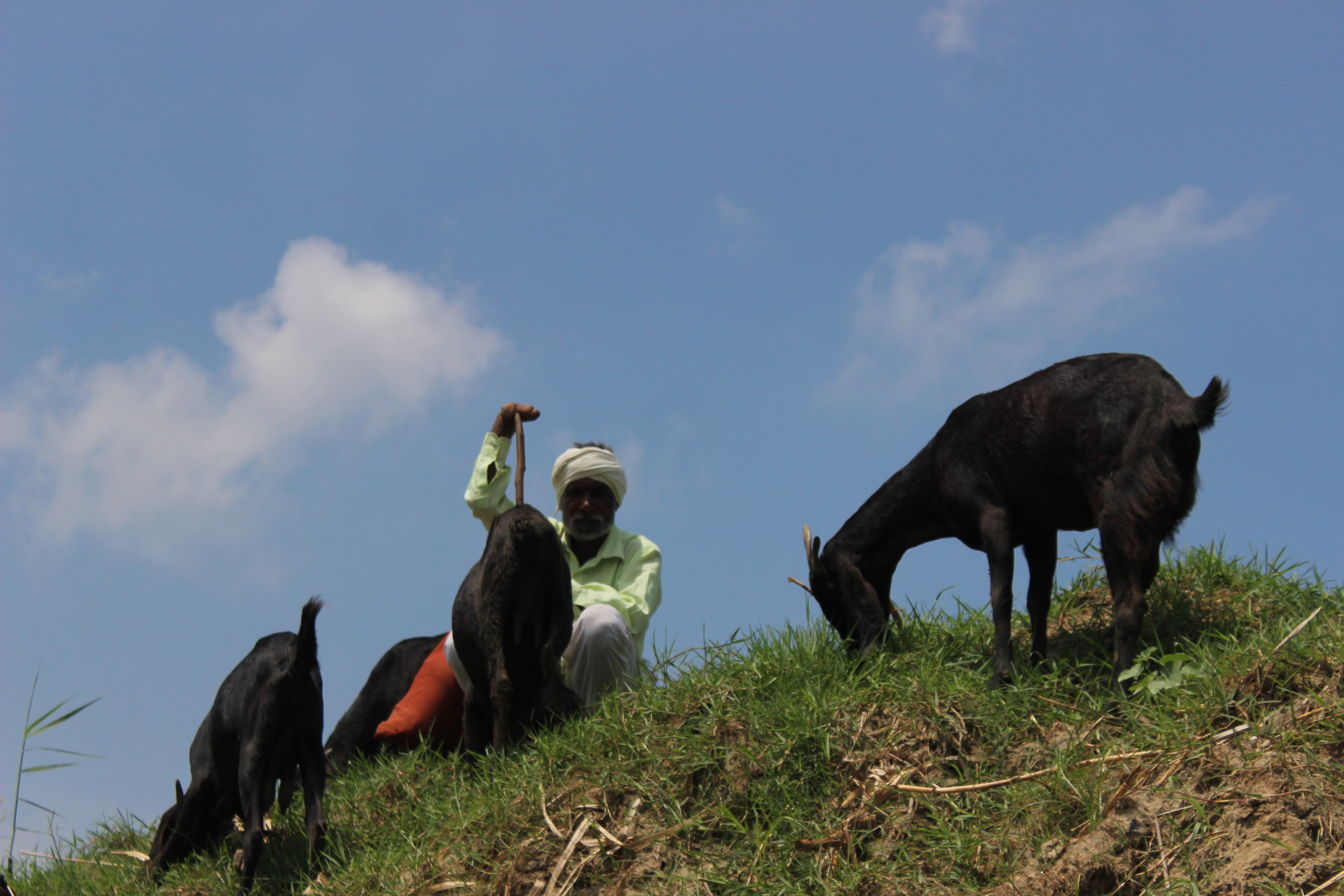
Shepherd in Pindi Balochan

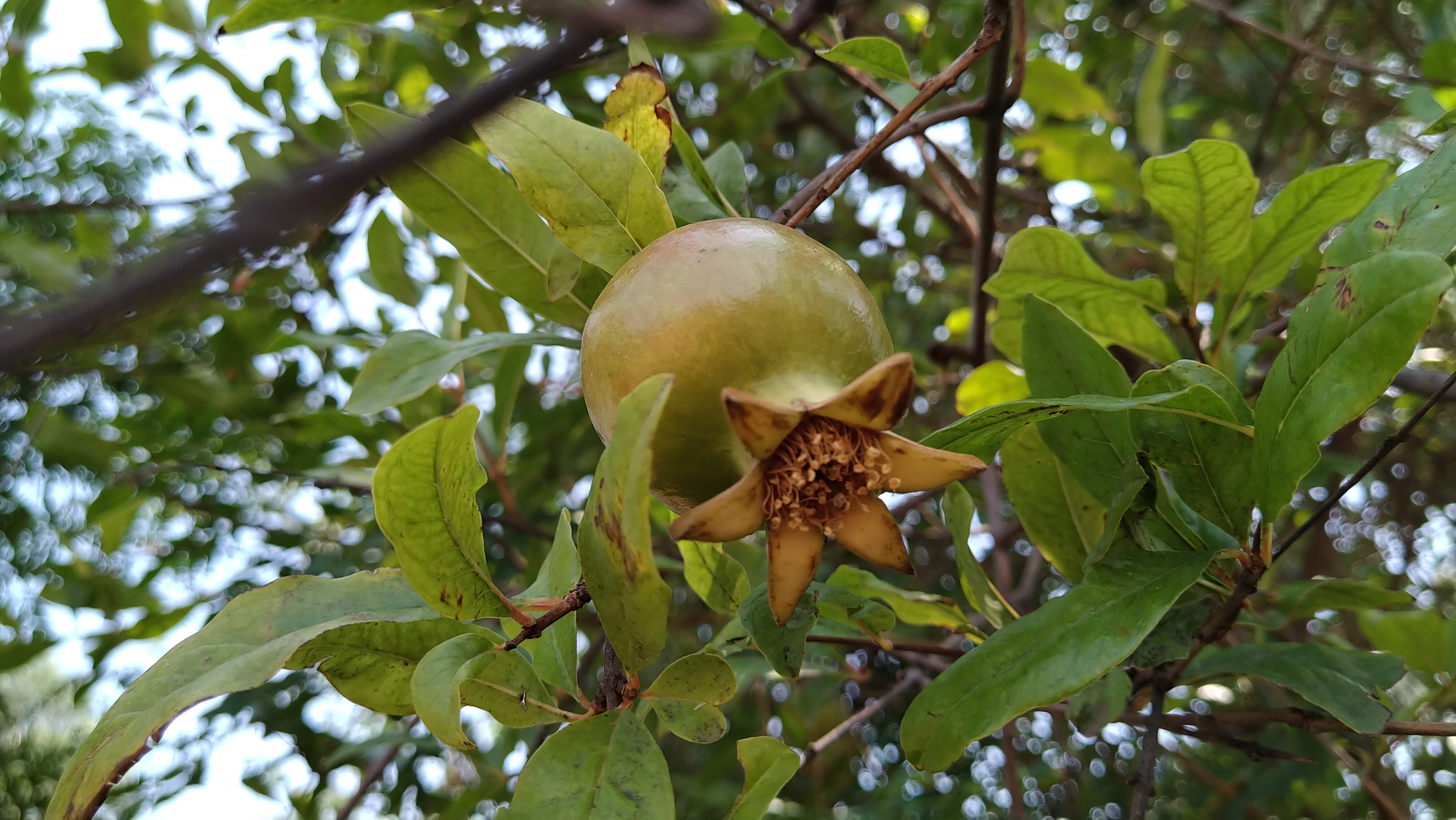
Pomegranate tree in Pindi
