= Machaki Mal Singh =

Human settlement in India

Machaki Mal Singh is a small village located 7 km from Fardikot in the Indian state of Punjab. It is situated on the banks of the Indira Gandhi Canal.
