= Bhisiana =

- Census town
- Location in Punjab, India Bhisiana (India)
- Coordinates: 30.2873°N 74.7694°E
- Country: India
- State: Punjab
- District: Bathinda

Population (2001)
  - Total: 4,775

Languages
  - Official: Punjabi
- Time zone: UTC+5:30 (IST)

Bhisiana is a census town in Bathinda district in the state of Punjab, India.

== Demographics ==
As of 2001 India census, Bhisiana had a population of 4775. Males constitute 59% of the population and females 41%. Bhisiana has an average literacy rate of 75%, higher than the national average of 59.5%; with male literacy of 78% and female literacy of 69%. 15% of the population is under 6 years of age.

== Bhisiana Air port ==
Bhisiana air force base is one of the most strategically important bases in India, including a UAV unit.
