= Ahel, Faridkot =

Village in Faridkot District, Punjab, India

Ahel
- Village
- Location in Punjab, India Ahel (India)
- Coordinates: 30.712365°N 74.503527°E

Population (2011)
  - Total: 1,267

Languages
  - Official: Punjabi
- Time zone: UTC+5:30 (IST)
- PIN: 151212
- Telephone code: +91-
- Nearest cities: Sadiq, Jand Sahib

Ahel (Punjabi: ਅਹਿਲ) is a village in Punjab, India. It located 29 km away in the south from Faridkot, Punjab. It is Basically Sandhu community's village, but with the time more communities migrated from other places. The population as per 2011 census was 1267 people.
