= Sadiq (town) =

Town in Punjab, India

- Town
- Location in Punjab, India Sadiq (India)
- Coordinates: 30.707911°N 74.582511°E

Population (2011)
  - Total: 7,384

Languages
  - Official: Punjabi
- Time zone: UTC+5:30 (IST)
- PIN: 151212
- Telephone code: +91-
- Nearest places: Ghuduwala, Jand Sahib

Sadiq (Punjabi: ਸਾਦਿਕ) is a town and a sub-tehsil in Faridkot district of Punjab. It is 18 km (11 mi) from Faridkot City, 26 km (16 mi) from Ferozepur, 27 km (17 mi)from Sri Muktsar Sahib and 20 km (12 mi) from Guru Har Sahai. This tehsil includes 71 villages.

== Demographics ==
As of the 2011 India census, it had a population of 7,384, of which 3,852 were males and 3,532 were females, with total 1,435 families residing. The total geographical area of village is 1287 hectares. Its pin code is 151212.
