= List of things named after Guru Gobind Singh =

A number of places are named after the tenth guru of Sikhs, Guru Gobind Singh.

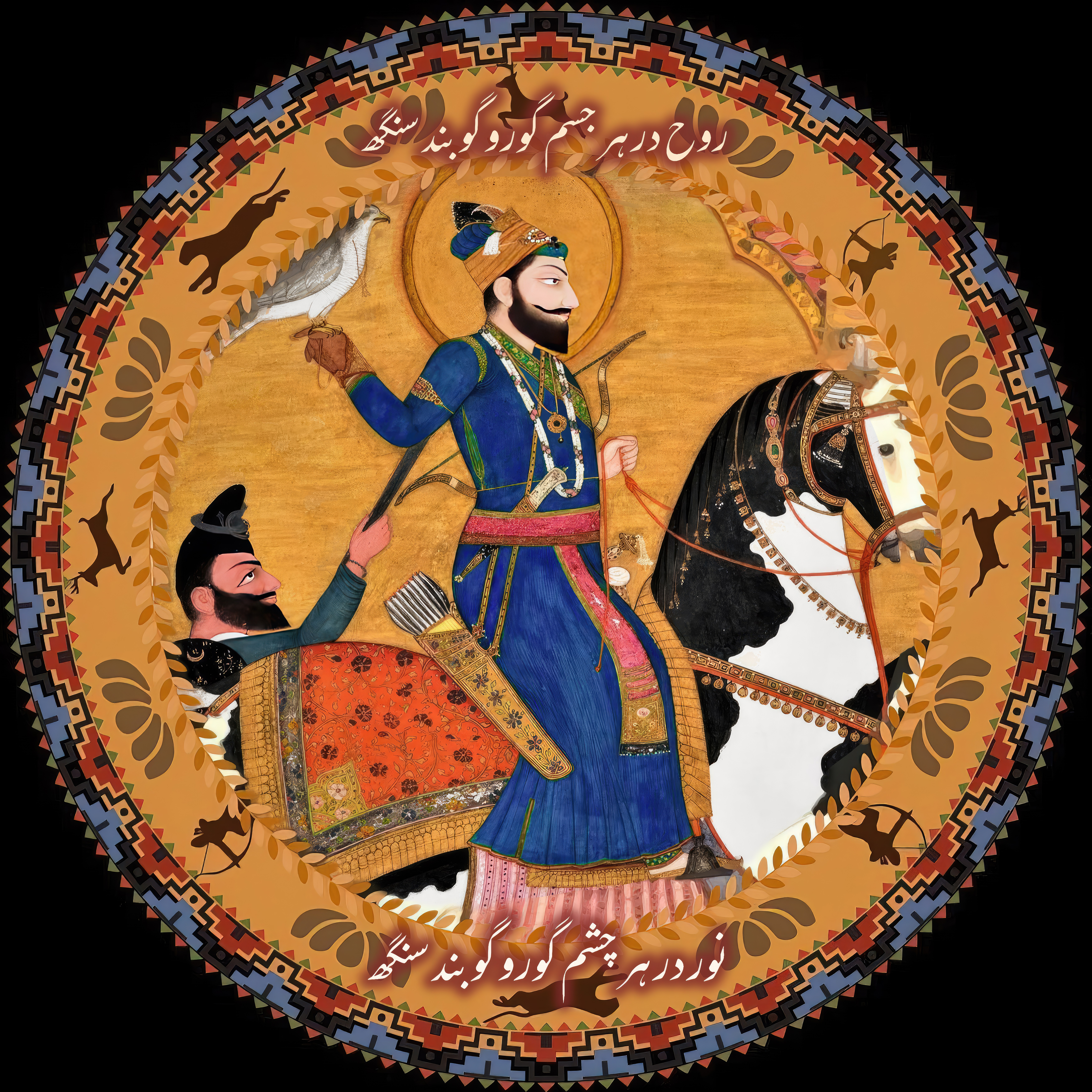
Portrait of Guru Gobind Singh Ji - The tenth guru of Sikhs

== India ==
=== Bihar ===
- Guru Gobind Singh Hospital, Patna Sahib (Bihar)
- Sri Guru Gobind Singh College, Patna

=== Chandigarh ===
- Shri Guru Gobind Singh College, Chandigarh
- Guru Gobind Singh College for Women, Chandigarh

=== Delhi ===
- Guru Gobind Singh Indraprastha University, New Delhi
- Sri Guru Gobind Singh College of Commerce, New Delhi
- Kalgidhar National Public Senior Secondary School, New Delhi
- Guru gobind Singh Marg, Delhi

=== Gujarat ===
- Guru Gobind Singh Hospital, Jamnagar, Gujarat, India

=== Haryana ===
- Shree Guru Gobind Singh Tricentenary University, Gurgaon
- Guru Gobind Singh College of Pharmacy, Yamunanagar
- Guru Gobind Singh Government Polytechnic, Cheeka

=== Himachal Pradesh ===
- Kalgidhar Trust, Baru Sahib (Himachal Pradesh)
- Gobind Sagar, a man-made reservoir situated in Bilaspur District, Himachal Pradesh.

=== Jharkhand ===
- Guru Gobind Singh Educational Society's Technical Campus, Kandra (v) Chas Bokaro Steel City, Jharkhand-827013

=== Karnatka ===
- Guru Gobind Singh College, Bangalore (Karnatka)

=== Madhya Pradesh ===
- Guru Gobind Singh Khalsa Higher Secondary School -(GGSKHSS) is a secondary school located in Jabalpur, Madhya Pradesh, India.
- Guru Gobind Singh Khalsa School, Jabalpur
- Shri Guru Gobind Singh Law College, Indore

=== Maharashtra ===
- Guru Gobind singh Endowment Chair for Research in Sikhism, (History Deptt. - Mumbai University)
- Shri Guru Gobind Singh Ji Airport, Hazur Sahib, Nanded
- Guru Gobind Singh Stadium, Nanded
- Guru Gobind singh Marg, Mulund Colony, Mumbai
- Guru Gobind Singh Industrial Estate, Goregaon (E), Mumbai
- Guru Gobind singh Foundation, Nasik
- Guru Gobind Singh Educational Institute in Kamptee Road, Nagpur
- Shri Guru Gobind Singhji (SGGS) Institute of Engineering and Technology, Nanded
- Guru Gobind Singh College of Engineering & Research Centre, Nasik
- Shri Guru Gobind Singhji Institute of Engineering and Technology, Nanded
- Guru Gobind Singh Polytechnic, Nasik
- Guru Gobind Singh Polytechnic, Nasik

=== Punjab ===
- Guru Gobind singh Study Circle, Ludhiana (UNESCO Peace Award Winner)
- Guru Gobind Singh Super Thermal Power Plant
- Guru Gobind Singh Marg
- Guru Gobind Singh Medical College, Faridkot
- Guru Gobind Singh Refinery, Phulokheri, Bathinda
- Guru Gobind Singh Bhawan, Punjabi University, Patiala
- Guru Gobind Singh Stadium, Jalandhar
- Mandi Gobindgarh, steel town of Punjab, India
- Guru Gobind Singh College Of Engineering & Technology, Talwandi Sabo, Bathinda
- Guru Gobind Singh College, Sanghera
- Guru Gobind Singh College of Education (For Women), Giddarbaha
- Guru Gobind Singh Polytechnic College, Handowal Kalan
- Kalgidhar Institute of Higher Education, Malout
- Trai Shatabdi Guru Gobind Singh Khalsa College, Amritsar
- Guru Gobind Singh Public School, Madahar Kalan, Shri Muktsar Sahib, Punjab

=== Uttar Pradesh ===
- Guru Gobind Singh Sports College, Lucknow

== Other countries ==
=== Canada ===
- Guru Gobind Singh Children's Foundation

=== England ===
- Gobind Marg, a street in Bradford, West Yorkshire, UK, where the Guru Gobind Singh Gurdwara is situated
- Guru Gobind Singh Khalsa College, Chigwell, Essex, England

=== United States ===
- Guru Gobind Singh Sikh Center, Plainview, New York, United States
- Guru Gobind Singh Foundation, North Potomac, Maryland, United States of America
