= Wagh (disambiguation) =

Wagh is an ancient village in Pakistan.

Wagh or WAGH may also refer to:

- WAGH, a radio station in Alabama, US
- Wagh (surname)
- Wagh River, in India
- Wagh El Birket, a district of Cairo, Egypt
- K. K. Wagh Institute of Engineering Education & Research in India
