= J. B. Joyce & Co =

Clockmaker in Shropshire, England

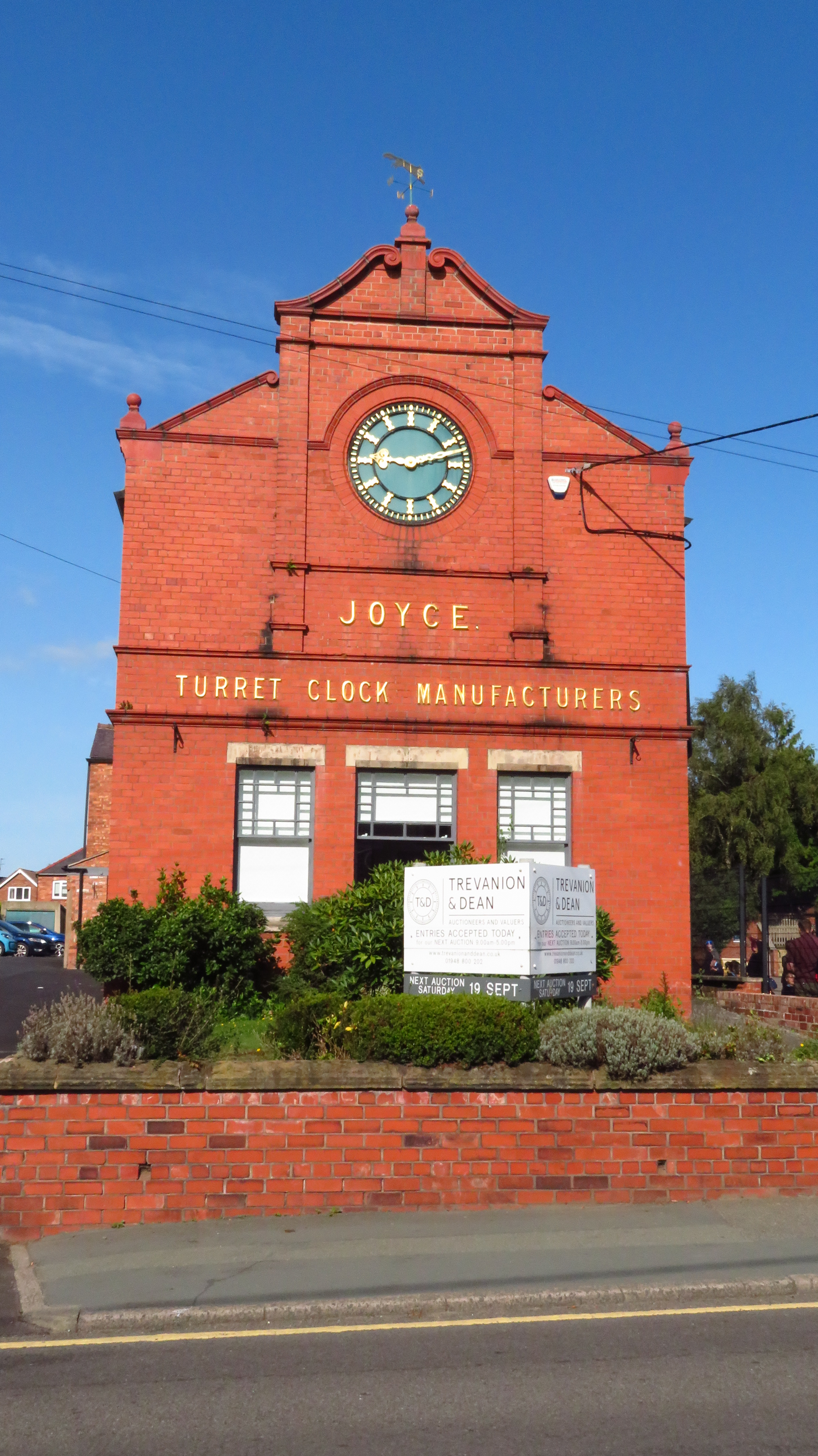
- Former factory of J. B. Joyce & Co
- Industry: Clock manufacturing
- Founded: Shropshire, England 1690 (336 years ago)
- Founder: William Joyce
- Defunct: 2012
- Headquarters: Shropshire, England
- Products: Tower clocks; post clocks; bracket clocks

J. B. Joyce & Co, clockmakers, were founded in Shropshire in England. The company claim to be the oldest clock manufacturer in the world, originally established in 1690, and have been part of the Smith of Derby Group since 1965. The claim is challenged by another English firm of clockmakers, Thwaites & Reed, who claim to have been in continuous manufacture since before 1740, with antecedents to 1610.

== History ==
William Joyce began in the North Shropshire village of Cockshutt making longcase clocks. The family business was handed down from father to son and in 1790 moved to High Street, Whitchurch, Shropshire. In 1834 Thomas Joyce made large clocks for local churches and public buildings. In 1849 the company copied the Big Ben escapement designed by Lord Grimthorpe. J. B. Joyce also installed synchronous electric clocks in a number of railway stations, including Liverpool's Lime Street Station, Aberystwyth in Wales, and Carnforth in Lancashire. In 1904 J. B. Joyce moved to Station Road, Whitchurch. John Edgar Howard Smith (1907–1983), a former managing director of Smith of Derby Group, designed the first and subsequent synchronous electric movements for J. B. Joyce, and their associated electro-mechanical bell striking units.

In 1964, Norman Joyce, the last member of the Joyce family, retired and sold the company to Smith of Derby. During the 1970s, many of the mechanical clocks were changed to use the electric motors made by the Smith parent company. However, J. B. Joyce continued to operate as a separate company, with mainly heritage work being carried out in the factory up to 2012, when a timed-bid auction was held to sell off surplus equipment, tools, and clock parts, at the Station Road premises. Interior designers, collectors of historic items, and aficionados of J. B. Joyce, joined to bid for a "piece of horological history".

== Notable clocks ==
=== United Kingdom ===
England
- Greenall's Brewery Clock Tower, Stockton Heath, Warrington, Cheshire (1845)
- St Michael and All Angels, Middlewich (1847)
- Market House, Shrewsbury (1855)
- Hereford railway station (1857)
- St James’ Church, Bradford (1857)
- Carnforth railway station, Lancashire
- Tynemouth Clock Tower (1861)
- St Mary's Church, Handsworth, Sheffield (1867)
- St James the Greater Church, Norton, Sheffield (1868)
- St Peter and St Paul’s Church, Sheffield (1869)
- Worcester Cathedral, Worcester, Worcestershire (1869-71)
- St Mary’s Church, Sutterton, Lincolnshire (1871)
- Chester Cathedral (1873)
- The Royal Exchange, Manchester (1875)
- St John's Church, Cotebrook (1876)
- St John's, Worcester (1877)
- Chichester Cathedral (1878)
- Liverpool Lime Street railway station, Liverpool
- Preston railway station, Lancashire (1880)
- Parish Church, Castle Donington (1880)
- All Saints’ Church, Ladbroke, Southam (1882)
- Salisbury Cathedral (1883)
- Abberley Clock Tower (1884)
- Tewkesbury Abbey (1887)
- Lichfield Cathedral (1891)
- Tom Tower, Christ Church, Oxford (1889)
- St John the Baptist Church, Coventry (1889)
- The Market House, Rothwell, Northamptonshire (1895-96)
- St Andrew's Church, Folkingham 1897
- Southwell Minster (1898)
- St Chad’s Church, Hanmer, Wrexham (1891)
- Jubilee Clock Tower, Churchill, North Somerset (1898)
- Eastgate Clock, Chester, Cheshire (1897)
- Dukinfield Town Hall, Dukinfield, Lancs (1901)
- Joseph Chamberlain Memorial Clock Tower, University of Birmingham, Edgbaston (1909)
- Shrewsbury Abbey (1909)
- Christ Church, Erith 1915

Scotland

- Glasgow University (1888)
- Kirk of St Nicholas, Aberdeen (1890)

Wales

- Bangor Cathedral (1842)
- Denbigh Town Hall (1850)
- Town Clock, Tredegar (1858)
- St Davids Cathedral (1871)
- Rhyl Town Hall (1879)
- Aberystwyth railway station, Aberystwyth

=== Worldwide ===
- General Post Office, Sydney, Australia 1891
- St George's College Clock Tower, Mussoorie, Uttarakhand, India
- Custom House, Shanghai, People's Republic of China (Shipped to Shanghai in 1927)
- City Hall, Cape Town, South Africa
- Post office "Station C" clock, Heritage Hall, Vancouver, Canada
- Victoria Clock Tower, Faridkot, Panjab (India)

=== Gallery ===
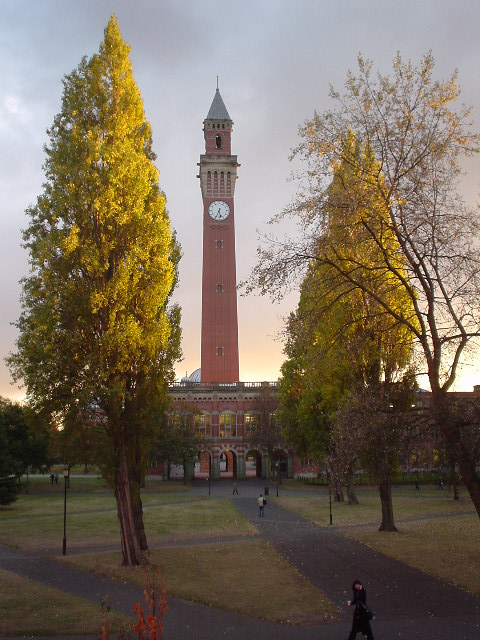
Joseph Chamberlain Memorial Tower, Birmingham

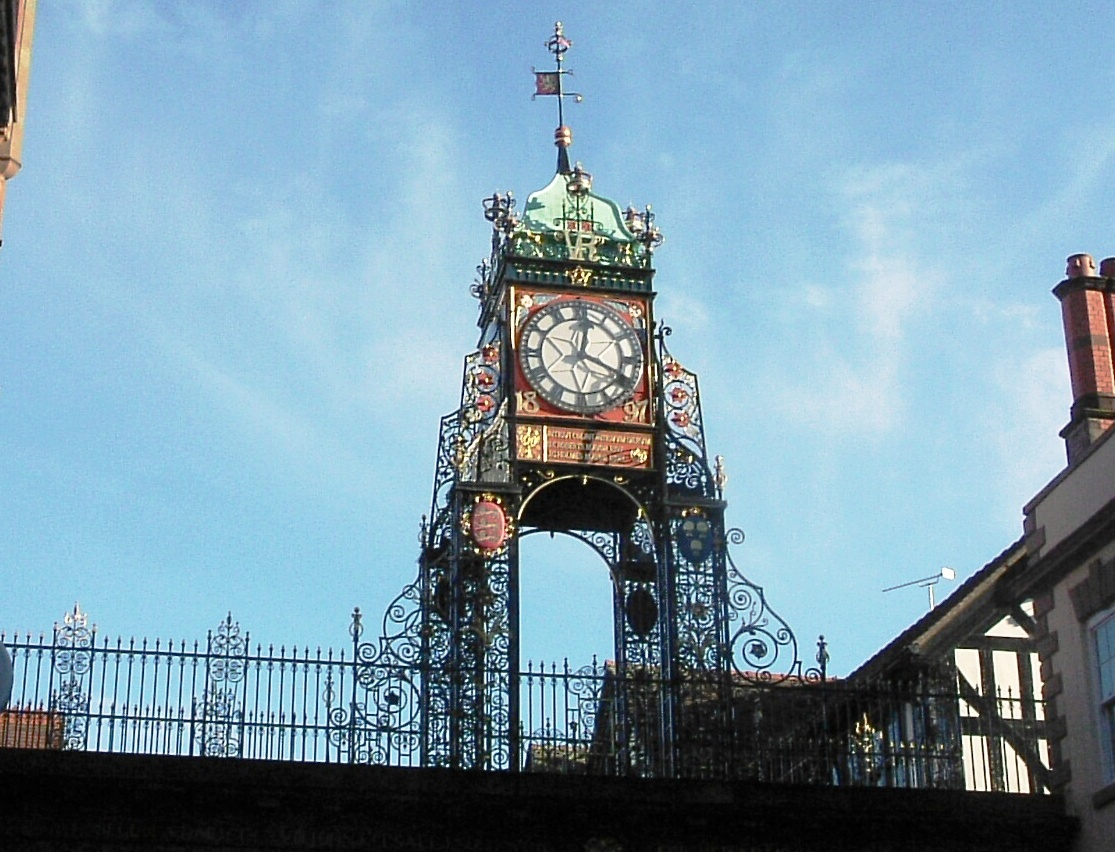
Eastgate, Chester

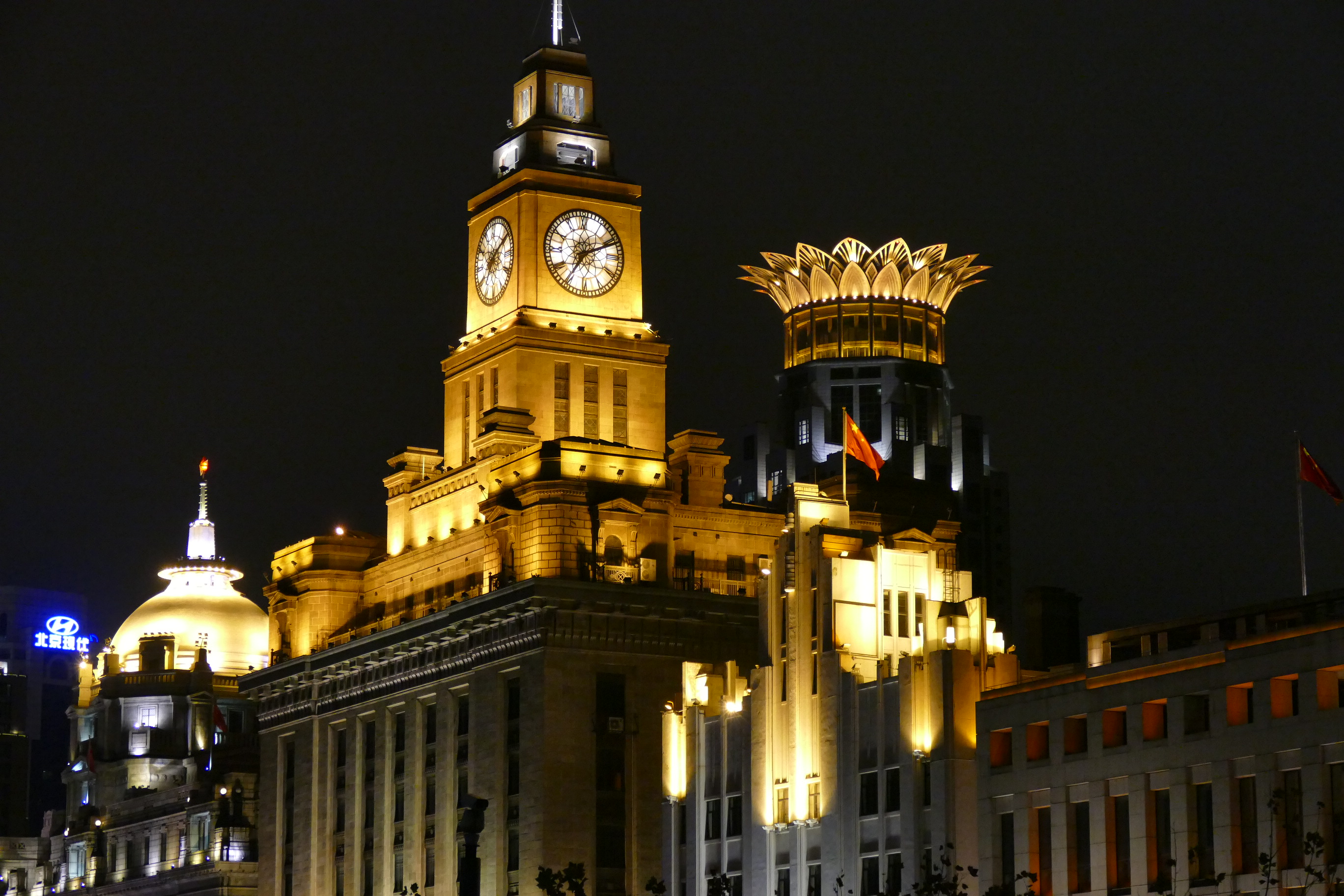
Custom House, Shanghai

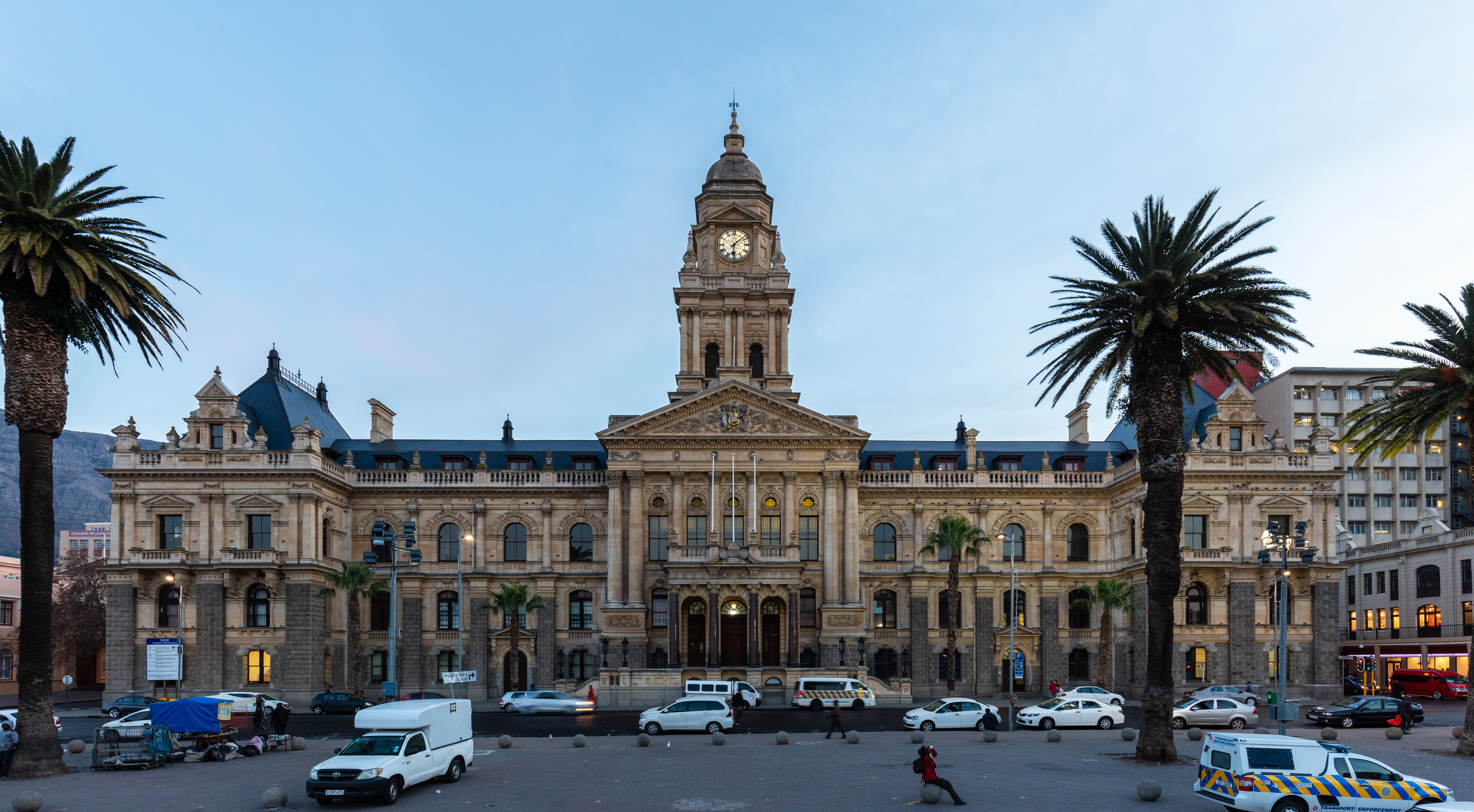
Cape Town City Hall, Cape Town

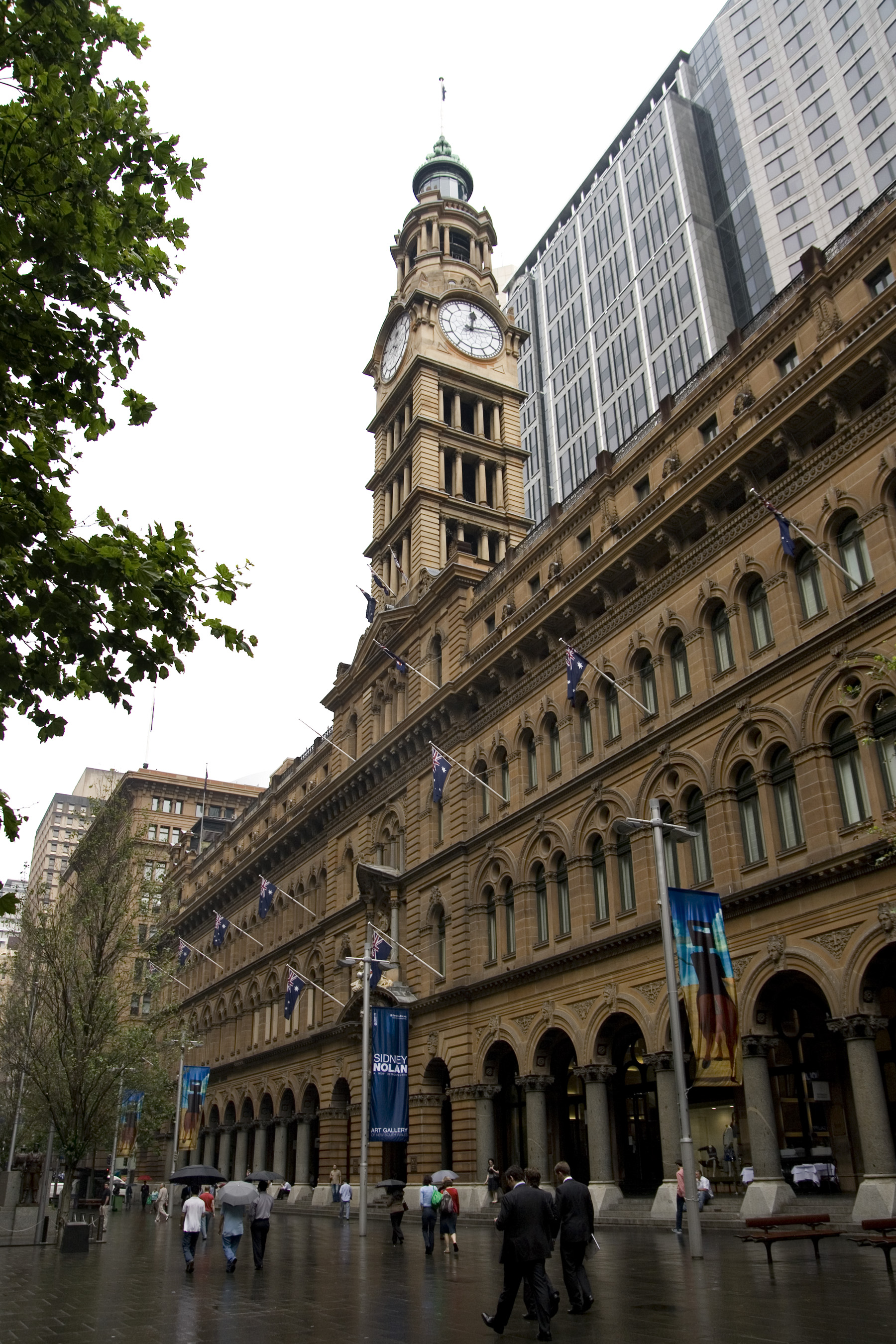
General Post Office, Sydney

== See also ==
- List of oldest companies
- Clock tower
- List of clocks
- Smith of Derby Group
