= Ghuduwala =

Village in Faridkot District, Punjab, India

Ghuduwala ਘੁੱਦੂਵਾਲਾ
- Village
- Location in Punjab, India Ghuduwala (India)
- Coordinates: 30.697914042738148°N 74.55369461856061°E

Government
  - Type: Sarpanch
  - Body: Gram panchayat

Area
  - Total: 522 ha (1,290 acres)

Population (2011)
  - Total: 1,042
  - Density: 200/km^{2} (517/sq mi)

Languages
  - Official: Punjabi
- Time zone: UTC+5:30 (IST)
- PIN: 151212
- Telephone code: +91-
- Nearest cities: Sadiq, Jand Sahib

Ghuduwala (Punjabi: ਘੁੱਦੂਵਾਲਾ) is a village in Faridkot district of Punjab, India. It is located right between Ferozepur, Sri Muktsar Sahib, Faridkot, and Jand Sahib. The village falls in Faridkot tehsil.

== Demographics ==
The population of this village is 1042 of which 555 are males while 487 females as per population census of 2011. The nearest post office to this village is Jand Sahib 2 km away, pin code is 151212. The total geographical area of village is 522 Hectares/5.22 km^{2}.

District	Post Office	Pin Code	Population	Area	Nearby	Police Station
Faridkot	Jand Sahib	151212	1,042	500 Hectare	Sadiq, Jand Sahib	Police Station Sadiq (3 km away)

== Educational Institutes ==
- SBRS College for Women
- SBRS Pub Sen. Sec. School, Ghuduwala.
- PST Memorial Public School
- Govt. Primary School, Ghuduwala
