= Jand Sahib =

Village in Punjab, India

- Village
- Location in Punjab, India Jand Sahib (India)
- Coordinates: 30.689439°N 74.527481°E

Languages
  - Official: Punjabi
- Time zone: UTC+5:30 (IST)
- PIN: 151212
- Telephone code: +91-
- Nearest cities: Ghuduwala, Sadiq

Jand Sahib (Punjabi: ਜੰਡ ਸਾਹਿਬ) is a village in Faridkot district, known for the historic Gurudwara of the Sikhs. The history of this Gurudwara is believed to be related to Guru Gobind Singh Ji. It is located 25 km west of Faridkot City. The Postal Code of Jand Sahib is 151212.

== Schools ==
- Govt. Senior Secondary School, Jand Sahib
- Akal Academy, Jand Sahib

== Photo gallery ==
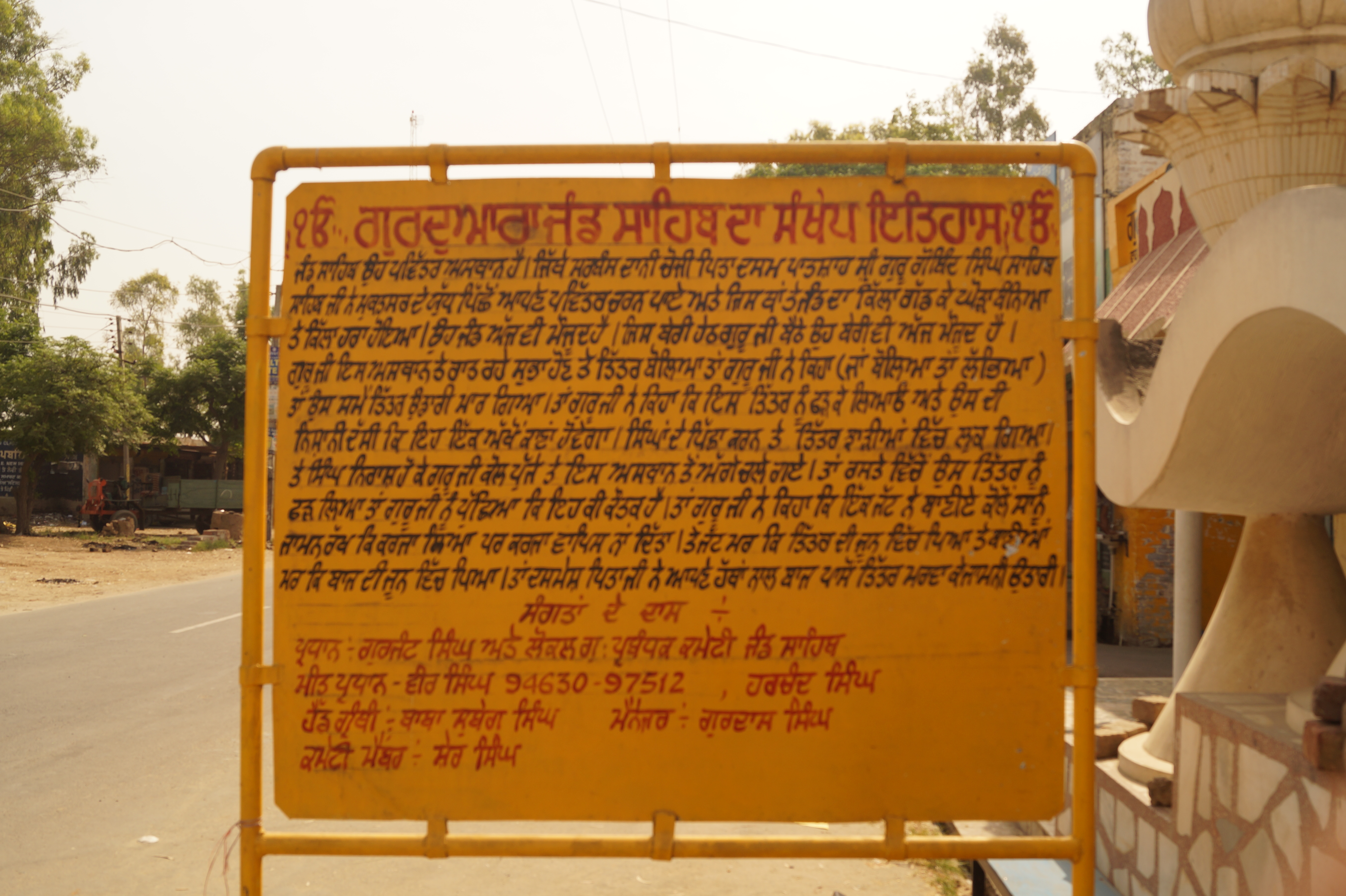
History of Gurudwara Jand Sahib

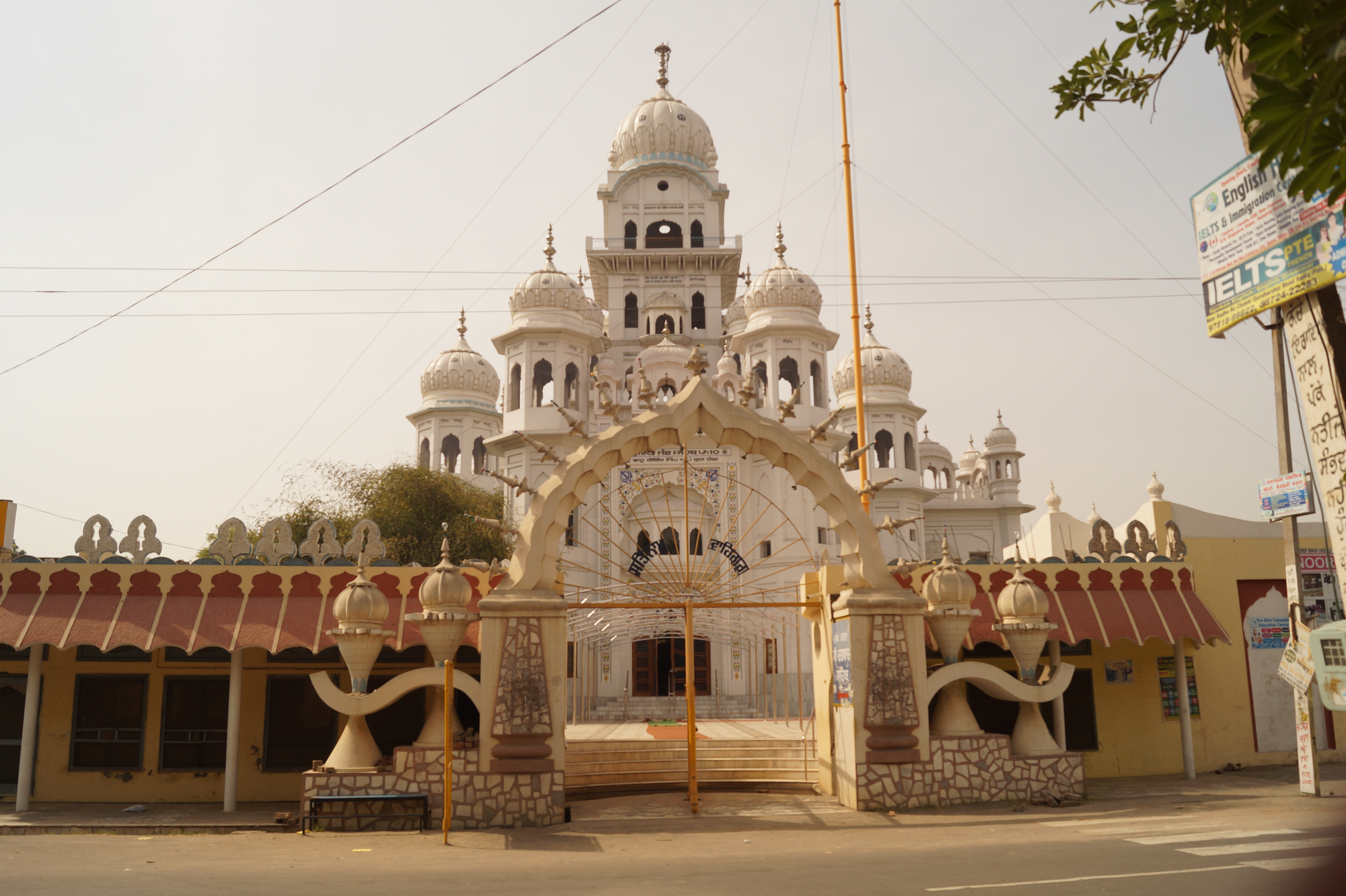
Photo of Gurudwara Sahib

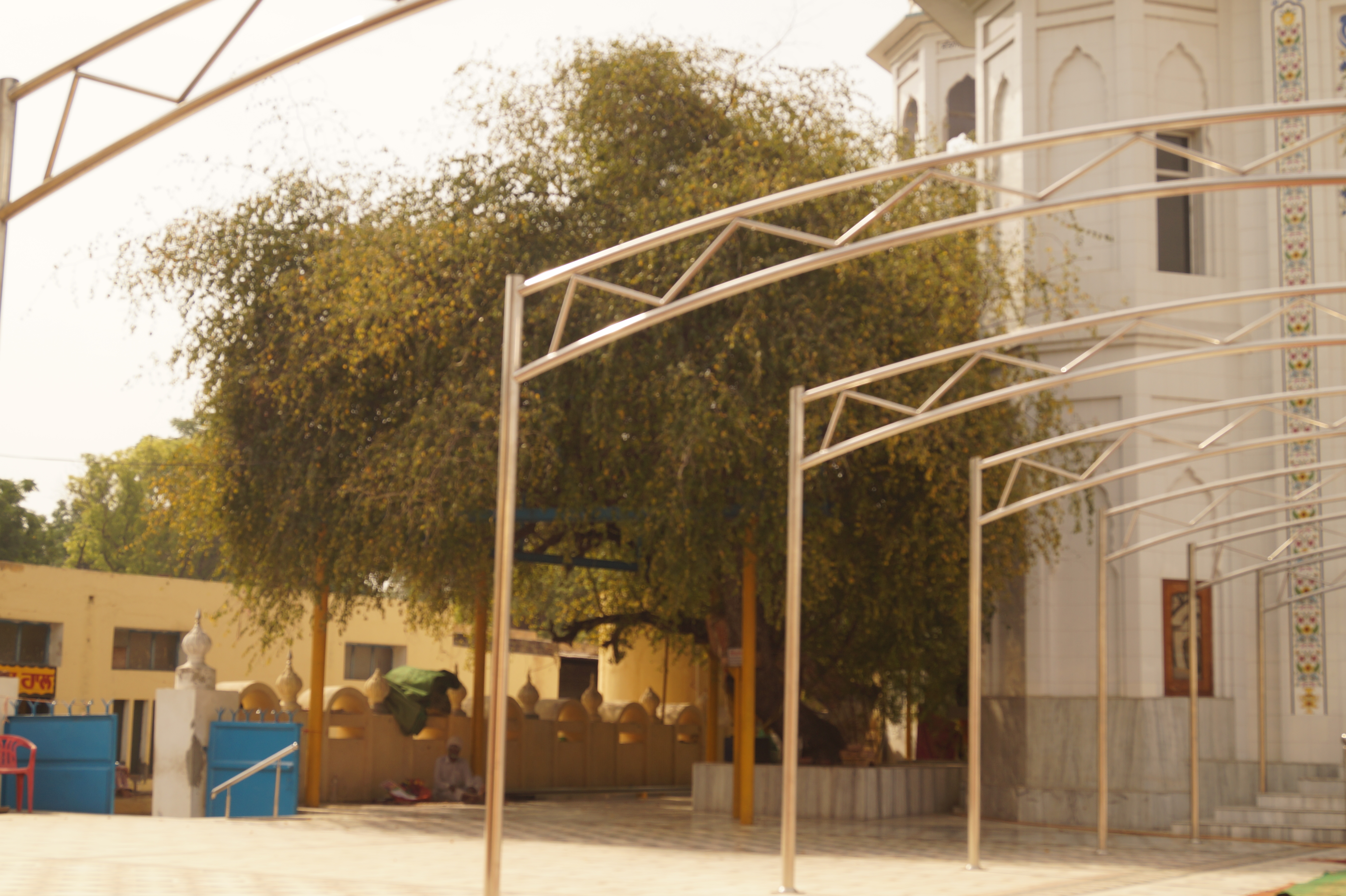
Historic Jand tree

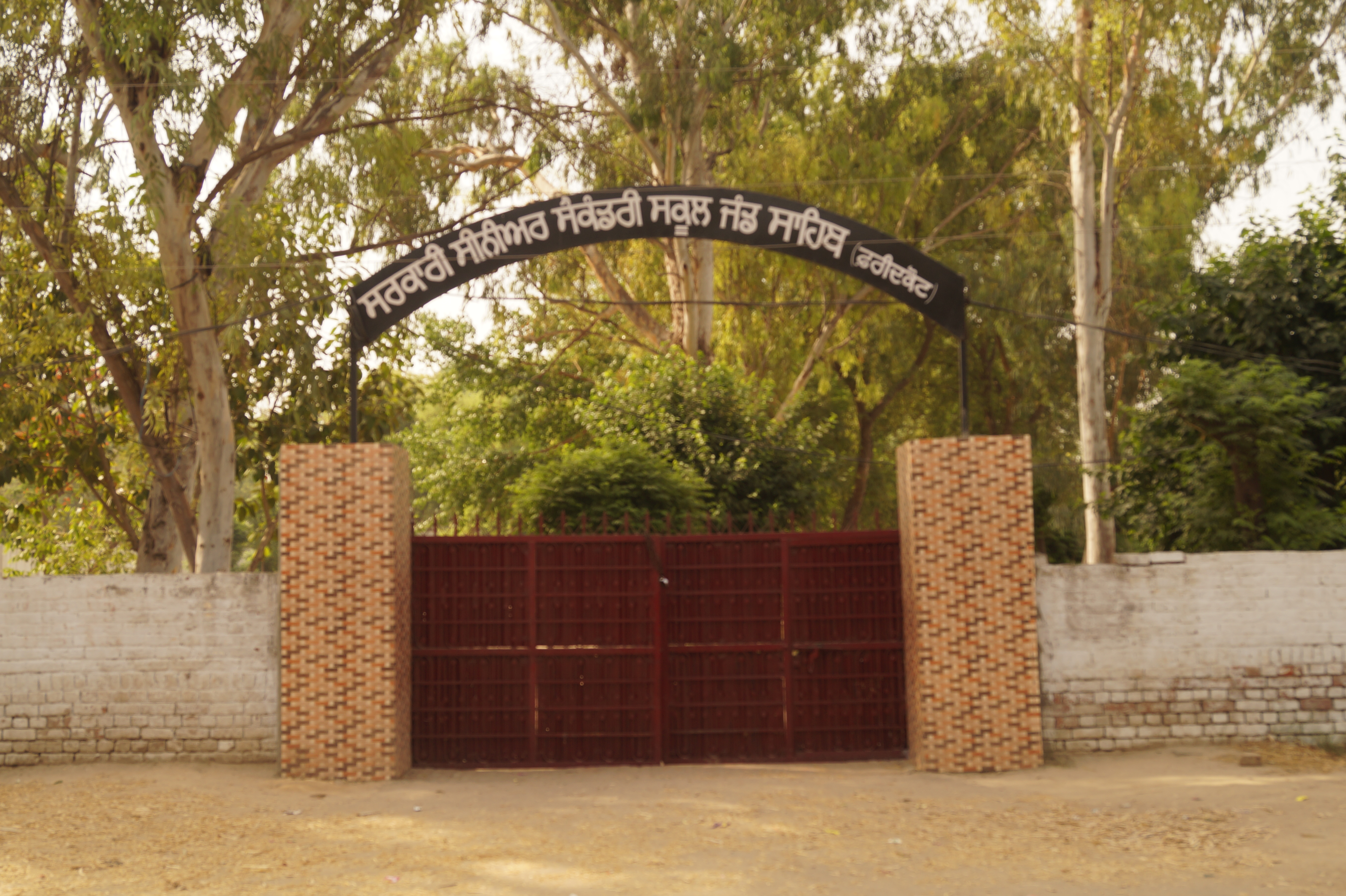
Govt. Senior Sec. School, Jand Sahib

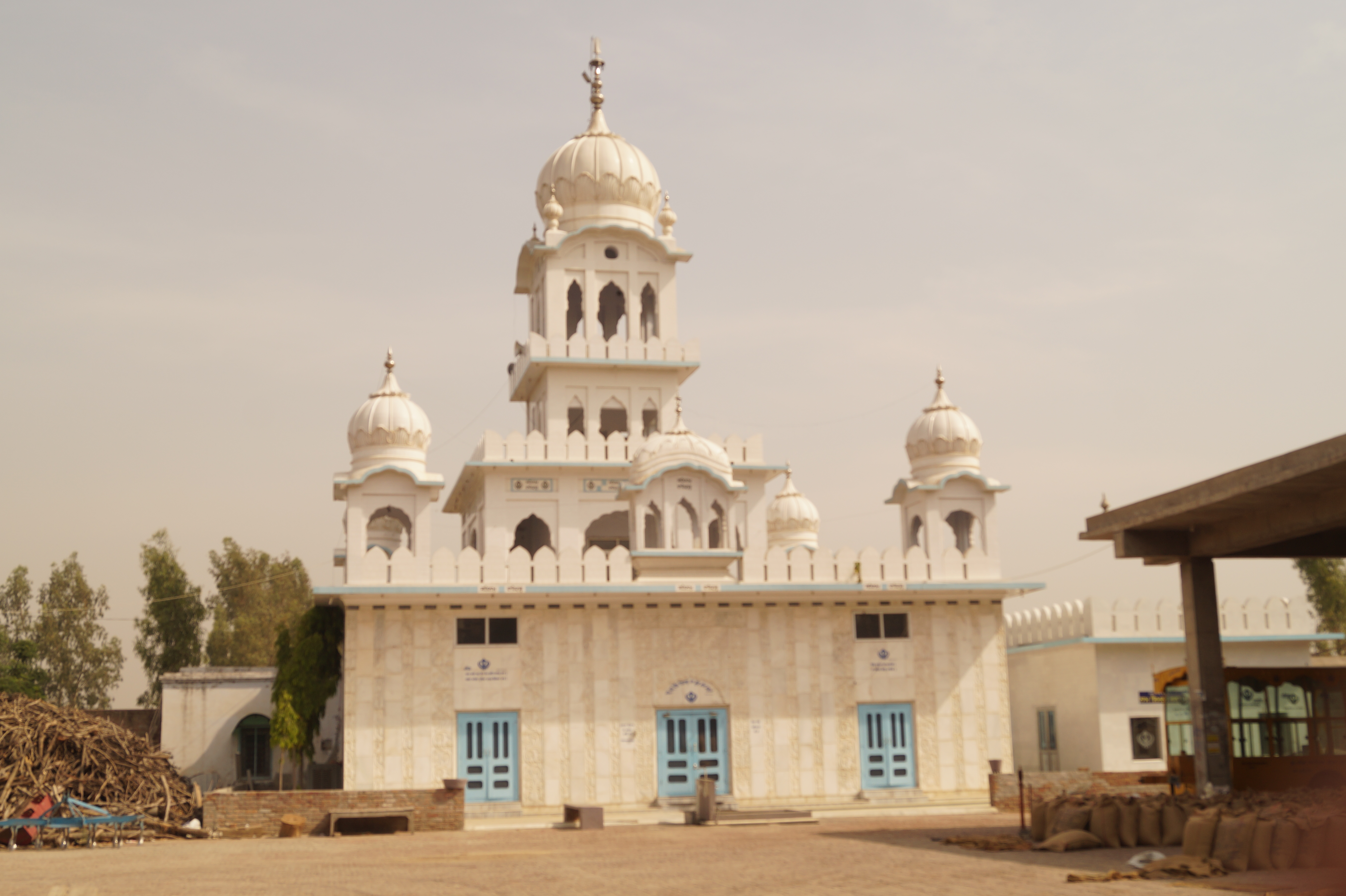
Another image of Gurudwara Sahib
