= Education in Nashik =

Nashik has been the educational hub of North Maharashtra. The city has two state run universities: Yashwantrao Chavan Maharashtra Open University (YCMOU) (located near Gangapur village on the outskirts of Nashik) and the Maharashtra University of Health Sciences.

KK Wagh Engineering College, Nashik.

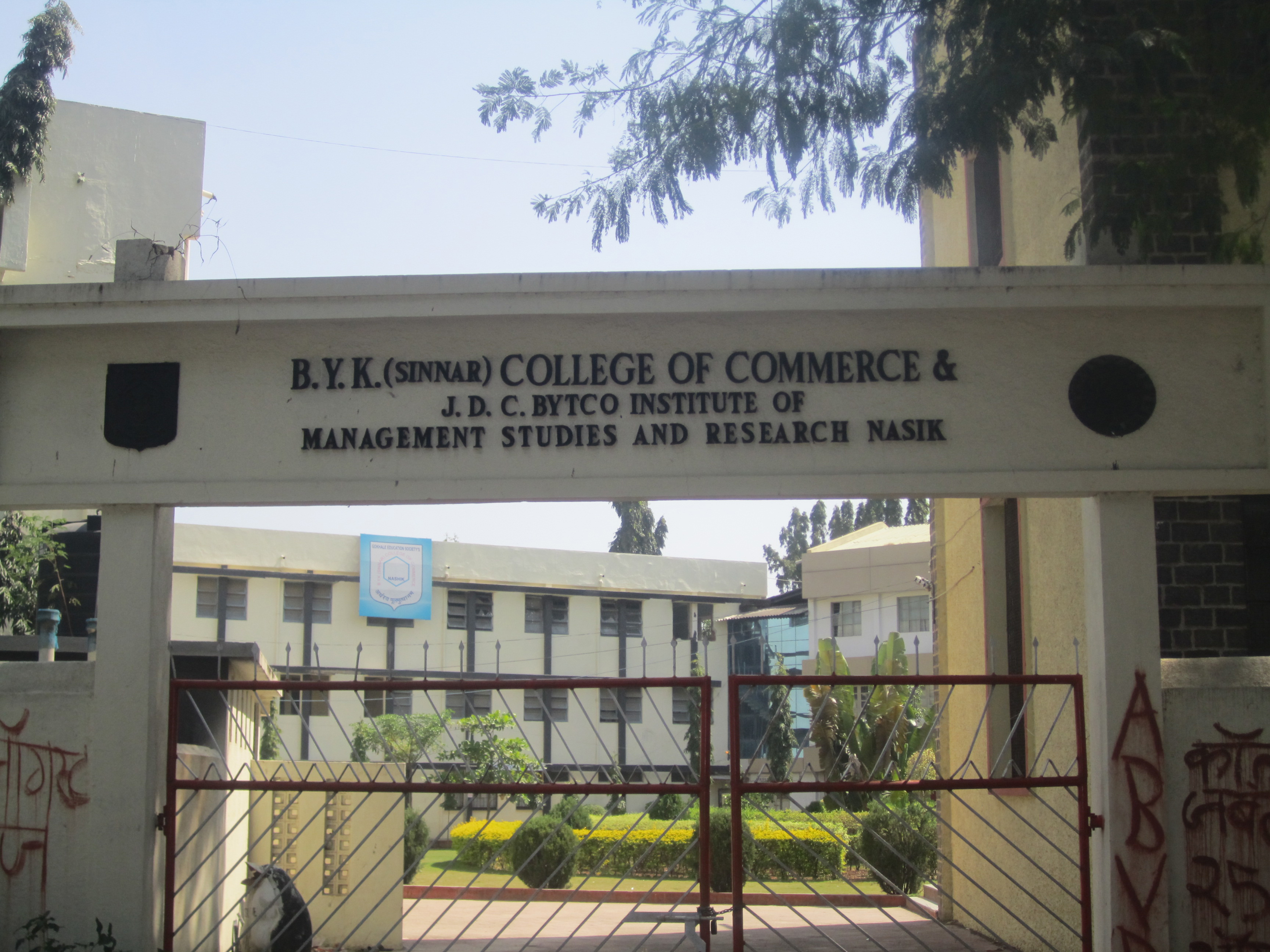
BYK College

== Colleges ==
- KRT Arts, B. H. Commerce and A.M.Science College (K.T.H.M)
- K.V.N Naik College
- BYK College
- Symbiosis Institute of Operations Management

== Engineering colleges ==
- K. K. Wagh Institute of Engineering Education & Research
- NDMVP's College of Engineering
- Guru Gobind Singh College of Engineering and Research Center (GCOERC)
- Sandip Foundation
- K.V.N Naik College of Engineering
- SNJB'S College of Engineering, Chandwad, Nashik
- Gokhale Education Society's R. H. Sapat College of Engineering, Management Studies and Research
- G.N Sapkal Engineering College, Nashik
- Indian Railways Institute of Electrical Engineering, Nashik ( IREEN )
- Karmaveer Adv.baburao Ganpatrao Thakare College of Engineering
- Nashik District Maratha Vidya Prasarak Samaj's K.B.T. College of Engineering
- Shatabdi Institute Of Engineering, Nashik
- SND College of Engineering & Research Centre, Yeola, Nashik
- Matoshri College of Engineering, Eklahare, Nashik

== Diploma in Engineering colleges ==
- K. K. Wagh Polytechnic
- K.V.N. Naik S.P. Sanstha's Polytechnic
- NDMVPS Samajs Rajarshee Shahu Maharaj Polytechnic
- Guru Gobind Singh Polytechnic
- Sandip polytechnic
- SNJB'S polytechnic Nashik
- Matoshri Aasarabai Polytechnic
- Brahma Valley Polytechnic

== Other ==
- Divyadaan: Salesian Institute of Philosophy

== Schools ==
- Rangubai Junnare English Medium School
