= Guru Gobind Singh Hospital, Patna City =

Guru Gobind Singh Hospital
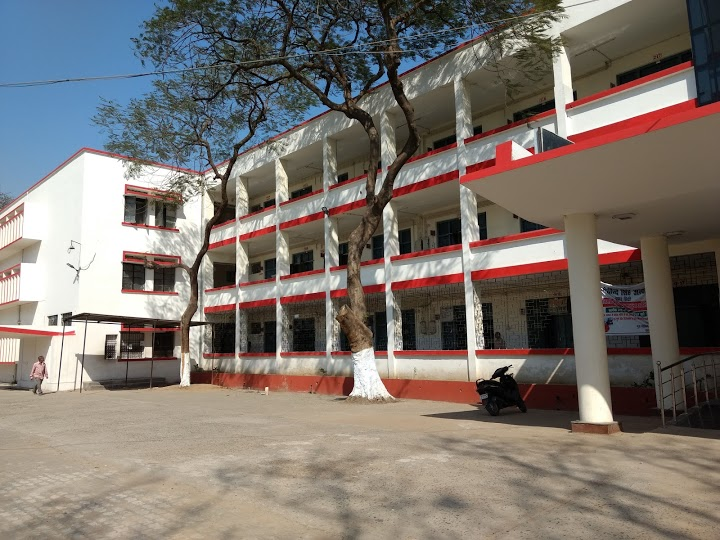

Geography
- Location: Main road, Ashok Rajpath, Khamji Begum Colony, Sadikpur, Patna City, Patna, Bihar 800006

Organisation
- Type: Government Funded Hospital

Services
- Beds: 312

History
- Founded: 1935

Guru Gobind Singh Hospital (GGSH) is located in Patna City (Patna Sahib), Patna. The hospital has been attached by the state health administration to the AIIMS Patna till the latter's complex to accommodate patients comes up in 2014. Patna high court directed to construct a boundary wall for the hospital spread on 68 acres at an estimated cost of Rs. 1.87 crore.

== See also ==
- List of places named after Guru Gobind Singh
- Takht Sri Patna Sahib
- Patna Sahib railway station
- Patna Sahib (Lok Sabha constituency)
