= Clock Tower, Faridkot =

Building in Faridkot City, India

Coordinates: 30°40′35″N 74°45′30″E

Victoria Clock Tower, Faridkot
- Ghanta Ghar
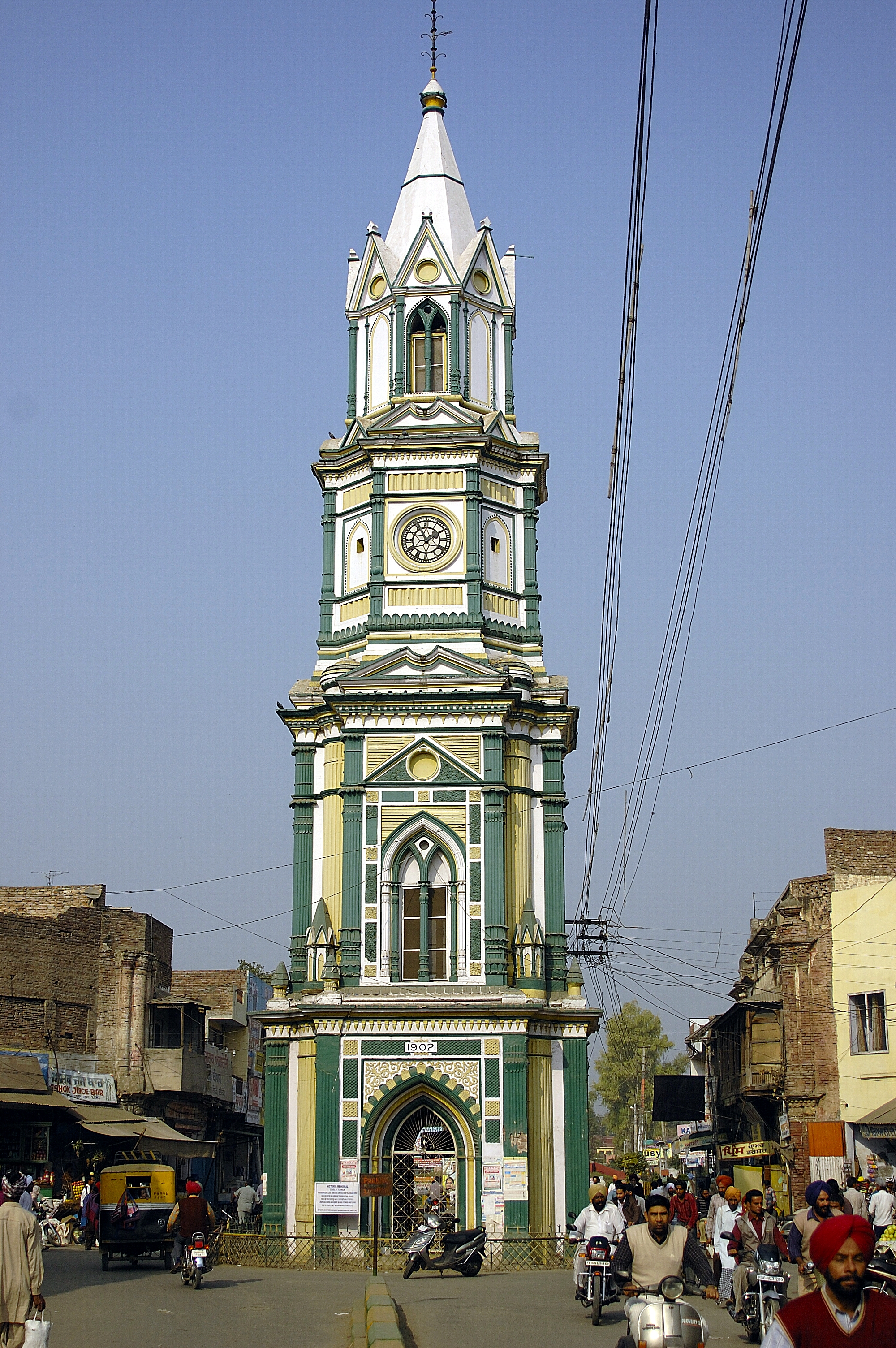

General information
- Location: Faridkot, India
- Completed: 1902

Clock Tower, Faridkot, popularly known as Ghanta Ghar or Victoria Clock Tower, is a historic clock tower located in the centre of the city of Faridkot in the Indian state of Punjab. It is regarded as an important example of Gothic Revival architecture in the former princely state of Faridkot.

== History ==
The tower was constructed in 1902 by Raja Balbir Singh in memory of Queen Victoria of the United Kingdom, who died on 22 January 1901. Construction of the monument was completed in 1902, a date that remains inscribed on the structure. The tower is mentioned in Aina-i-Brar Bans, a historical chronicle of the Faridkot ruling family published in 1902.

== Architecture ==
The Clock Tower is a free-standing masonry structure designed in the Gothic Revival style. It features four clock faces positioned on the cardinal directions, allowing the time to be viewed from different parts of the city. The tower served an important civic function during an era when personal watches were uncommon and public clocks were essential for daily life.

The bell installed in the tower was manufactured by Taylor of Loughborough, one of Britain's most renowned bell foundries. The clock mechanism was produced by J. B. Joyce & Company of the United Kingdom and supplied through the Anglo-Swiss Watch Company of Calcutta. These imported components illustrate the technological and commercial links between the princely state and the British Empire.

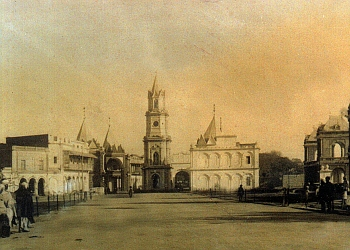
Photograph of the gothic-styled Victoria Clock Tower of Faridkot State, ca.1915.
