= Guru Gobind Singh Medical College =

Medical College in Faridkot City, Punjab, India

Coordinates: 30.6833°N 74.7357°E

- Established: 1973; 53 years ago
- Affiliations: Baba Farid University of Health Sciences
- Principal: Dr. Seema Grover Bhatti
- Location: Faridkot, Punjab, India
- Website: ggsmch.org

Guru Gobind Singh Medical College is a public medical college located in Faridkot, Punjab, India.

Giani Zail Singh, president of India (1982–1987) was one of the few people involved in bringing the medical college to the Faridkot city, when he was the Chief minister of Punjab in 1972–1977. The first batch came to GGS Medical College Faridkot during the year 1973 for MBBS course. Since then this medical College has trained over 100 doctors each year.

In year 2013, many allied health science subjects has started being taught at this medical college. One among them is Bachelor of Audiology and Speech Language Pathology (BASLP). GGS Medical College currently runs both undergraduate and postgraduate degree course and trains 10 audiologists and speech therapists every year.

== History ==
Guru Gobind Singh Medical College is a Punjab Government institution established in 1973. This college was transferred to Baba Farid University of Health Sciences, Faridkot as its constituent Medical College in October, 2006. Earlier Medical Council of India recognized the College 50 MBBS admissions per year in year 2010. Further the college is permitted increase in MBBS seats to 100 from 50 for the academic year 2013- 14 onwards in year 2013.

== Education and medical facilities ==
=== Education ===
In addition to MBBS, this institute also offers post-graduation courses of MD, MS in the specializations of Medicine, Community Medicine, Forensic Medicine, Surgery, Pediatrics, Respiratory Medicine, Ophthalmology, Dermatology, Immuno-Haematology, Blood Transfusion, Pharmacology, Pathology, Microbiology, Biochemistry, Physiology, Anatomy, Anesthesiology, Psychiatry, Orthopedics, Venerology & Leprosy, Radiotherapy and Otorhinolaryngology. Courses are taught for both theory and practical training.

=== Medical care facilities ===
Hospital has 1000 beds for in-patients admission. There are various OPD's, which remains open on weekdays from 8:00 am to 2:30 pm. OPD's are available for General Medicine, Pediatrics, Obstetrics & Gynaecology, Orthopedics, Diet, ENT, Ophthalmology, Neurology and Cancer.

=== Critical care facility ===
The college has critical care facilities for the patients of the neighboring area. A Surgical and Neuro-surgical critical care unit with beds was created in year 2009. Currently there is a 60 bedded critical care unit in the hospital as per details below:

Critical Care Facilities
Department	No. of Beds
Medicine/Chest & TB (MICU)	19
Surgery/Neurosurgery (SICU)	18
Paediatrics (PICU)	6
Neonatal Intensive Care Unit (NICU)	12

All these units are equipped with beds, monitors and ventilators and other supportive equipment to provide critical care to patients.

=== Super-specialization ===
The college has super-specialization facilities in the areas of Urology, Cardiology, Neurology, Neurosurgery, Nuclear Medicine and Plastic Surgery. Three storied building for super-specialty wing is in final stages of construction. Cardiac Cath Laboratory is also established in the college of the hospital.

Rs.15.00 Crores were allocated by the Government of India for establishment of a separate Unit under Mother & Child Health Care Scheme of NRHM. Construction of a three storied building is in progress.

=== Diagnostic and testing facilities ===
This college has Departments of Radiotherapy and Nuclear Medicine with equipment like Cobalt -60 Teletherapy, HDR Brachytherapy, Conventional Simulator, Two Linear Accelerators with IGRT & IMRT, SPECT-CT and PET-CT to provide comprehensive care to the cancer patients under one roof. This is the only facility of its kind in a Government institution in North India.

The department of Radio-diagnosis is equipped with 1.5 tesla M.R.I., 16 slice CT Scan, Mammography, Color Doppler and latest Digital X –ray machines. The hospital is equipped with Blood Bank facilities.

== Research and publication ==
Apart from teaching and hospital job, the faculties of the college are actively involved in research work. The college offers Ph.D. programs in Biochemistry, Microbiology, Anatomy, Pharmacology, Nuclear Medicine, Radio diagnosis and Radiotherapy. In the recent years, a number of seminars, conferences and workshops have been held in the college by different departments and the faculty members have published about 360 research papers in different National/International Journals. More than 50 research projects are at different stages of completion by different faculty members.

== Student activities ==
Talents of the students is not only seen in academics but also in extracurricular activities. The following activities are carried out regularly by the students:

=== Doctor’s Day celebrations ===
National Doctor's Day is celebrated on 1 July every year. Program is inaugurated by Vice Chancellor of Baba Farid University of Health Sciences or Principal of the college by lightening the lamp. Program starts with prayer to God. A number of cultural activities are performed followed by prize distribution.

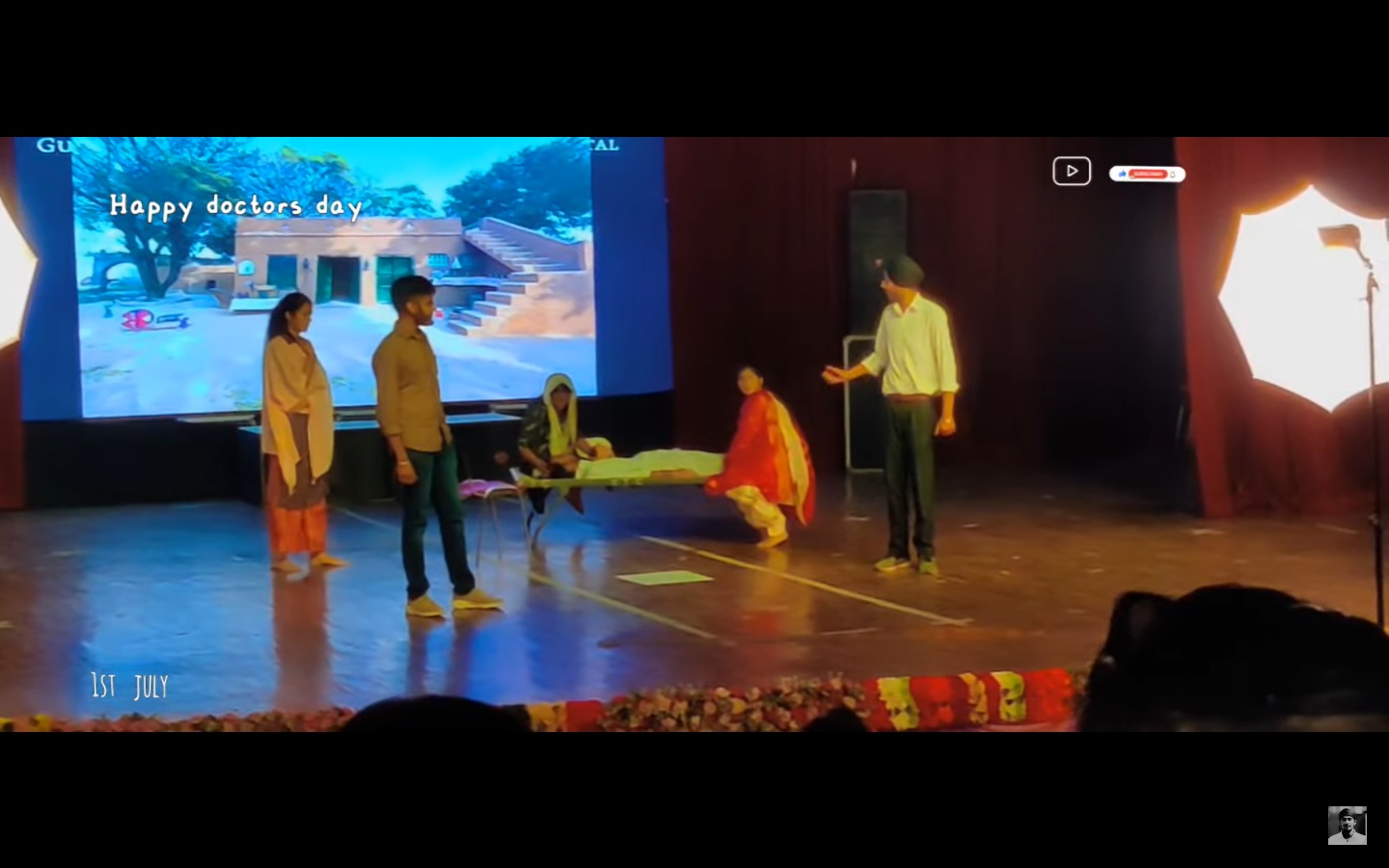
A scene from the play performed at Doctor's Day Function

=== Fresher’s Welcome Party ===
Fresher's Welcome Party is given by 2nd Prof. students to newly admitted students. A function is organized in college auditorium. Where new students perform various Art performance such as singing, dance, playing musical instruments, comedy acts etc. Function is concluded by refreshment and award distribution for good performance in various events.

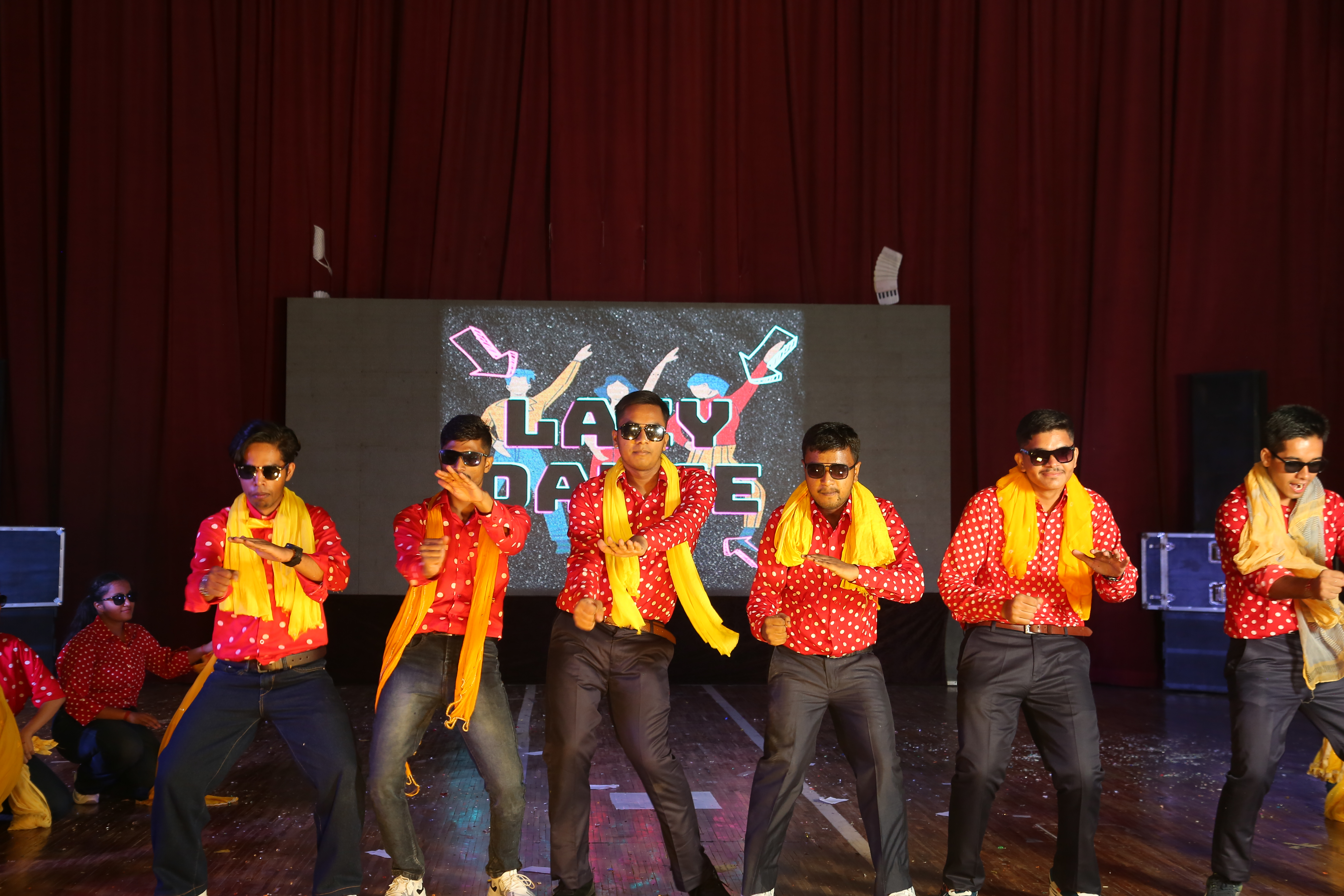
Lazy Dance performance during the Fresher's Welcome Party held on 20 August 2022.

=== Community Medicine ===
MBBS students have adopted families from nearby villages and colonies to provide healthcare facilities. Students monitor the living conditions, health status, eating and drinking habits of these families. On basis of collected data, suggestions are given to improve the present conditions.

== See also ==
- List of places named after Guru Gobind Singh
- Baba Farid University of Health Sciences, Faridkot
