= Wagh (surname) =

Wagh is a Marathi surname used by the Maratha caste, which literally means 'tiger'.

People with Wagh surname:

- Amey Wagh (born 1987), Indian Marathi actor
- Anutai Wagh (1910–1992), Indian educator
- Dhondia Wagh (died 1800), Indian soldier and adventurer
- Chitra Wagh (born 1975), Member of Legislative Council Maharashtra
- Dilip Wagh, Indian politician
- Dushyant Wagh (born 1987), Indian actor
- Girish Wagh, Indian businessman
- Kshitij Wagh, Indian playback singer and a composer
- Mark Wagh (born 1976), English cricketer
- Mayuri Wagh, Indian Marathi actress
- Pratap Wagh, Indian politician
- Saleel Wagh, Indian Marathi poet and philosopher
- Sharvari Wagh (born 1997), Indian actress
- Sneha Wagh (born 1987), Indian actress
- Shrikant Wagh (born 1988), Indian cricketer
- Smita Wagh, Indian politician
- Vishnu Wagh (1964–2019), Indian poet, writer, dramatist, journalist and politician
- Vitthal Wagh (born 1945), Indian Marathi poet, writer and artist
