= St Mary's Church, Sutterton =

St Mary's Church
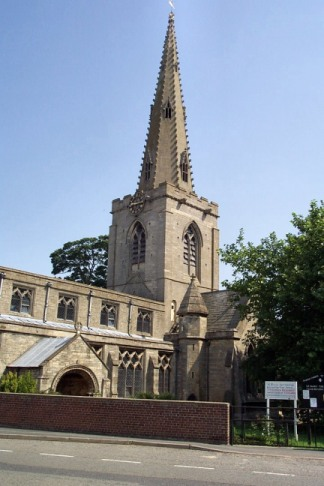
- St Mary's Church
- 52.90213°N 0.09106°W
- OS grid reference: TF 28492 35558
- Location: Sutterton
- Country: England
- Denomination: Church of England

History
- Status: Church
- Founded: 12th century

Architecture
- Heritage designation: Grade I
- Designated: 26 January 1967
- Style: Norman, Early English

Administration
- Diocese: Lincoln
- Parish: Sutterton, Lincolnshire

Clergy
- Vicar: Rev. C Robertson

St Mary's Church (or The Church of Saint Mary the Blessed Virgin) is an Anglican church and Grade I Listed building in Sutterton, Lincolnshire, England.

== Architecture ==
The present stone church is cruciform in shape and dates to the second half of the 12th century. It is predominantly constructed with Barnack stone ashlars.

Over time the building has been altered to keep up with the fashions of the time and generally to enhance its status. In Victorian times there was significant re-building, particularly of the chancel and south transept. In 1862 this was overseen by the architect Edward Browning of Stamford. Much of the original stone and special features were re-incorporated so that the building did not become overwhelmingly "victorianised".

Notably, the original arch and surround of the carved Norman north door was left in place. D Stocker, in the Corpus of Romanesque Sculpture in Britain and Ireland, has suggested that the decoration around the arch of the north doorway is one of the richest Romanesque survivals in the county and that it recalls the decoration on the north portal on the west facade of Lincoln Cathedral.

Alterations took place in the remainder of the 19th century including the installation of the pews, the tiled floors and walls in the chancel and the mosaic reredos.

The church is Grade I listed.

== 14th-century figures ==
The chancel houses three recumbent 14th-century stone figures, representing John Boneworth, who was priest in the parish in 1400, together with his mother and father. They were recently moved from the south transept.

== Bells ==
There is a peal of eight bells, with the heaviest weighing just over twelve cwt. The bells date from the 18th century, but two were recast in 1937. In addition there is a sanctus or priest's bell thought to have been made by Simon Hathfield of London in about 1353.

The bells were re-hung on an iron frame with ball bearings by Taylors of Loughborough in 1937.
