= Guru Gobind Singh Polytechnic, Nasik =

Guru Gobind Singh Polytechnic, Nashik
- Motto: Gyanam Paramam Dhyeyam
- Type: Private institution affiliated to the Maharashtra State Board of Technical Education, India
- Established: 1978
- Affiliations: Maharashtra State Board of Technical Education
- President: S. Birdi Gurdev Singh
- Principal: Prof.Shrihari Upasani
- Location: Nashik, Maharashtra, India; 19.957643°N 73.777755°E

Guru Gobind Singh Foundation was set up in 1978 by the prominent and illustrious Punjabi residents of Nasik with the primary objective of providing quality education to the students irrespective of their caste, creed, religion or nationality so as to promote morality, patriotism, self-respect and self-confidence.

== Courses ==
GGSP offers diploma engineering studies in five disciplines:

- Civil Engineering
- Mechanical Engineering (Shift 1 & 2)
- Electronics and Telecommunication Engineering
- Computer Engineering
- Electrical Engineering
- Mechatronics Engineering

== Campus ==
The campus is nestled in an spacious 12 acres education complex, with Ultra-modern Laboratories, Workshops, Classrooms, vast Playgrounds Gymnasium and Cafeteria.

== Admission ==
Admission to the diploma courses is through the CAP rounds conducted by DTE, Maharashtra (Based on SSC scores).
