= KTHM College, Nashik =

College in Nashik, Maharashtra

MVPS Samaj's KTHM College, Nashik
- Motto: बहुजन हिताय बहुजन सुखाय
- Type: College
- Established: 1969 (42 Years ago)
- Academic affiliations: Savitribai Phule Pune University
- Principal: Dr. Smt. K. M. Ahire
- Location: Nashik
- Website: kthmcollege.ac.in

The K.R.T. Arts, B.H. Commerce & A.M. Science College, Nashik, popularly known as KTHM College, Nashik was established in 1969 and is affiliated to University of Pune. The college is situated on a campus on the bank of river Godavari. Maratha Vidya Prasaraka Samaj, Nashik the parent organization of KTHM is the second largest educational institute in Maharashtra.

== Academics ==
The college offers degree in Arts, Humanities, Politics, Commerce, Science and Computer Science. The college offers undergraduate and postgraduate courses in arts, science and commerce including professional courses in computer science, animation and journalism. Short term courses like Video Production, Foreign Languages are also offered. College also offers the junior college courses in arts, commerce, science and in various vocational streams.

The college also provides facility for distance education and has established study centers of Indira Gandhi National Open University (IGNOU) and Yashwantrao Chavan Maharashtra Open University (YCMOU), Nashik.
