= Guru Gobind Singh Children's Foundation =

Children's charity

- Founded: 1999
- Type: Charity
- Location: Scarborough, Toronto, Ontario, Canada
- Region served: Worldwide
- Website: ggscf.com

The Guru Gobind Singh Children's Foundation is a foundation run by children/youth with a vision to help other children meet their basic needs, while adding meaning to their lives, and carrying out the work in the spirit of the teachings of Sikh Gurus.

== Background ==
The Guru Gobind Singh Children's Foundation (GGSCF) was established by children and youth in 1999 as a way to celebrate the 300th Anniversary of the Khalsa and to honour the tenth Guru of the Sikhs.

A youth group in Scarborough Gurdwara took up the initiative to establish the foundation in 1993 when a 50km charity relay run-a-thon was organized for the Hospital for Sick Children. Some of the younger children, repeated the run in 1997 in support of the Canadian Cancer Society. The spirit from this run was then captured and energies were directed into the celebrations of the 300th anniversary of the Khalsa that was about two years away. At a meeting held on May 18, 1998 some 50 children/youth and some parents helped to choose the name of the foundation and set a general direction. It was decided that a foundation, which could help those in need on an ongoing basis rather than having one-off events, that would be recognized in the larger community, and where the children and youth could focus their energies and do sewa as a way of showing the world the spirit of our Gurus was needed. On July 3 to 5, 1998 an Akhand Path was held to obtain the Guru's blessings for the effort.

On January 23, 1999 the GGSCF held its first event to celebrate the 300th anniversary of the Khalsa in the form of a dinner where plans for the 500km charity relay run-a-thon from Toronto to Ottawa were presented. From July 11 to 17, 1999 the children with the help of older youth and parents completed the relay run that started at Dixie Gurdwara and finished on the steps of Parliament Hill in Ottawa. Over 300 children took part, of which 51 children and youth ran all seven days. On the journey over the 582km route to Parliament Hill the children and youth showed the spirit of the Sikh Gurus and thereby established the GGSCF with the blessings of WaheGuru.

The Foundation continues organize and participate in events to aid the local Canadian and global communities. Its contributions have been acknowledged by Canadian leaders, like Ontario' Premier and Liberal Leader Kathleen Wynne, international celebrities, like Fauja Singh, and global NGOs, like UNICEF.

== Mission ==
1. Organize interesting, challenging, and enjoyable charity fundraising events with a focus on "…children helping children…"
2. Provide long term financial aid to support children in poverty through existing charities.
3. Organize participation of children and youth in local charity events that focus on helping children, those in poverty, the physically challenged, those that provide medical treatment or education, or those that support environmental work and thereby make our communities and world a better place for the children of tomorrow.
4. Establish an administrative system that allows the children and youth to plan and develop the running of the Foundation with a view to providing continuing personal growth of the participants.
5. Grow the Foundation by fostering the spirit of community service and responsibility in accordance with the teachings of Sikh Gurus and under the principle "that we are all children of one God."

== Children's Run Across Canada ==
Since 1999 it has been a goal for the children and youth of the Guru Gobind Singh Children's Foundation to organize a run across Canada. In 2008 preparations were underway to make this dream a reality. The organization began planning the run which was to begin in St. John's, Newfoundland and end in Vancouver, British Columbia. The total distance to cover along the chosen route totalled 6779km. The run was to take place in the year 2009, marking the 10th Anniversary of the organization.

On July 1, 2009, Canada Day, the epic journey began in St. John's, Newfoundland. In total there were one hundred runners and volunteers who took part and ran relay format for 61 days. Along the way the runners met with local communities and experienced the beauty of Canada. The run ended in Stanley Park, Vancouver, British Columbia on August 30, 2009.

The Children's Run Across Canada raised money for children's hospitals in Canada and a health project in Liberia, Africa. In total $154,000 was raised by the children and youth through donations and pledges.
