= Gokhale Education Society's R. H. Sapat College of Engineering, Management Studies and Research =

University in Nashik, India

- Former names: Gokhale Education Society's College of Engineering
- Motto in English: Value Embedded Quality Technical Education
- Type: Private Un-aided
- Established: 2009-10
- Affiliations: Savitribai Phule Pune University, All India Council for Technical Education
- Budget: INR 9,53,18,571
- Chairman: Dr. M.S.Gosavi
- Principal: Dr. Prafulla C. Kulkarni
- Students: 2400
- Location: Nashik, Maharashtra, India; 19°57′51.5″N 73°48′07.3″E
- Website: Official Web Site

Gokhale Education Society's R. H. Sapat College of Engineering, Management Studies and Research is an All India Council for Technical Education (AICTE) approved technical institute for higher learning, offering graduate, post graduate and doctoral level education facilities in Engineering and computer Science, located at Nashik, near Pune, India. The college campus of 10 acres is in the heart of the city, on College Road.

== Background ==
The institute is affiliated to Savitribai Phule Pune University. Gokhale Education Society was established by Trimbak Appa Kulkarni, in memory of his mentor, Gopal Krishna Gokhale, Indian freedom fighter and known to be the spiritual guide of Mahatma Gandhi, on 19 February 1918, three years to the death of the leader, to provide holistic education to the poor and the needy. The Society now manages 17 centres and 121 institutions in Nashik, Thane and Mumbai, said to be tutoring 125,000 students with the help of 4000 staff.

The R. H. Sapat College of Engineering, Management Studies and Research, situated on 10 acres of land in Nashik with a built-up area of 14,295 square feet (1,328.0 m^{2}), is one of the institutions among GES centres. The college is ISO-9001:2000 certified and provides graduate, post graduate and research facilities in engineering and computer science.

== Facilities ==
R. H. Sapat College is equipped with facilities such as a workshop, central library, laboratories, internet, audio visual and medical facilities, sports and gymnasium, cafeteria, hostel and staff quarters.

== Courses ==
The College offers various AICTE approved courses, in affiliation with Pune University such as:

- Bachelor of Engineering (B. E.) in Civil, Computer, Electrical, Electronics and Telecommunication and Mechanical Engineering
- Master of Engineering (M. E.) in Computer, Mechanical Engineering Design, Digital Systems and Power Electronics and Drives
- Master in Computer Application (M.C.A.)

The College also offers research platforms on the above subjects.
