= Faridkot, India =

City in Punjab, India

Faridkot Farīdkōṭ (Punjabi)
- City
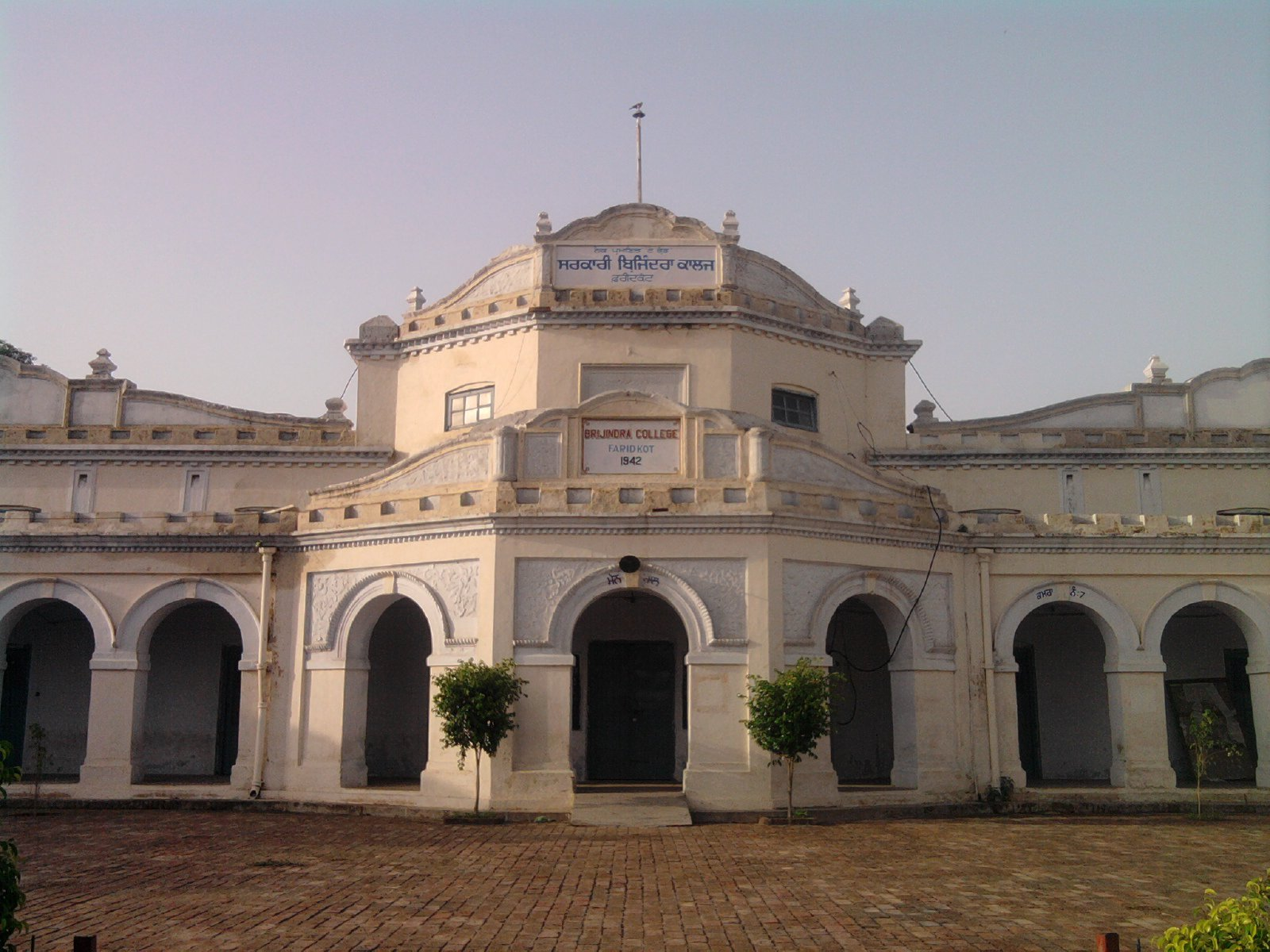
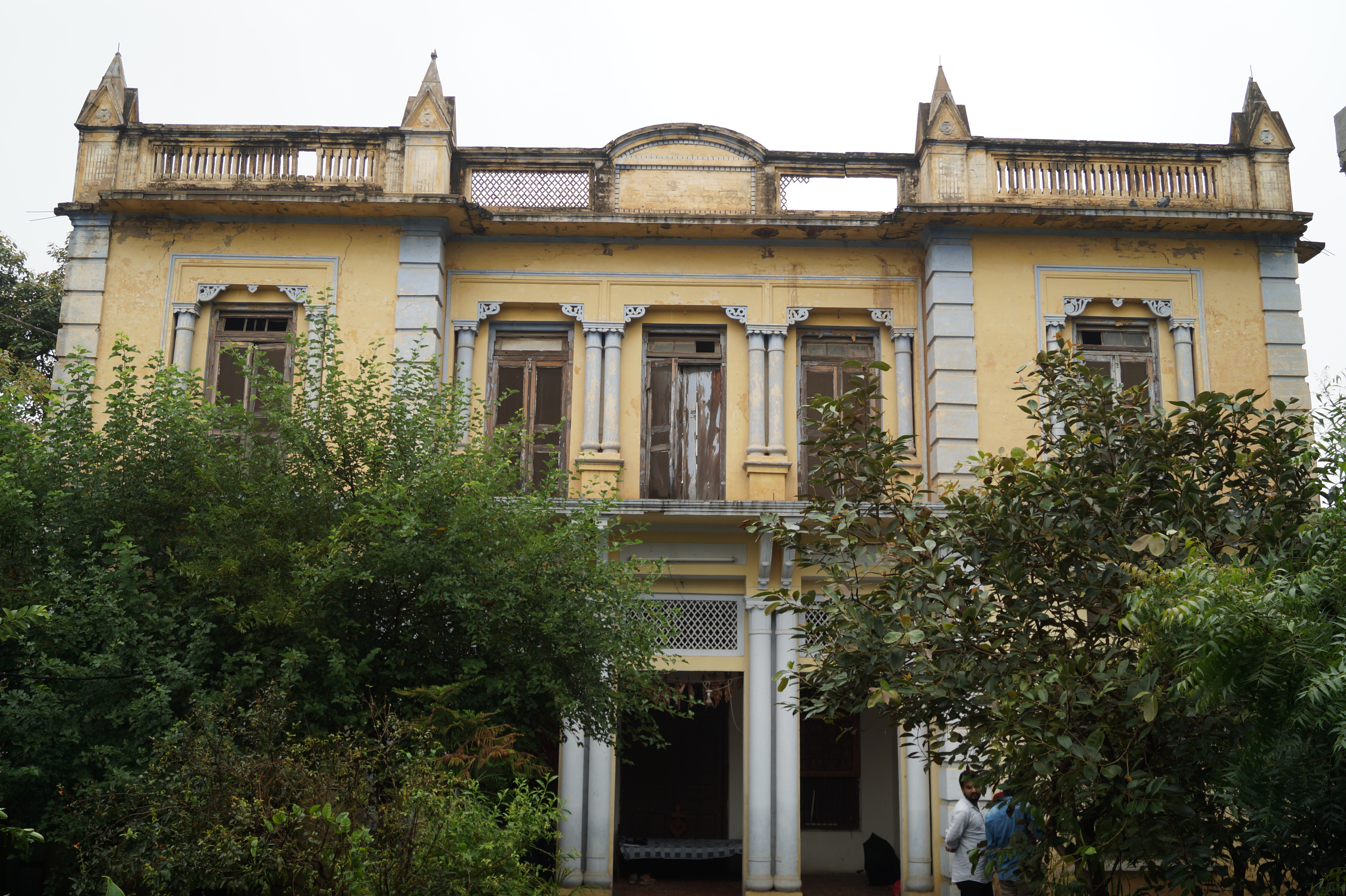
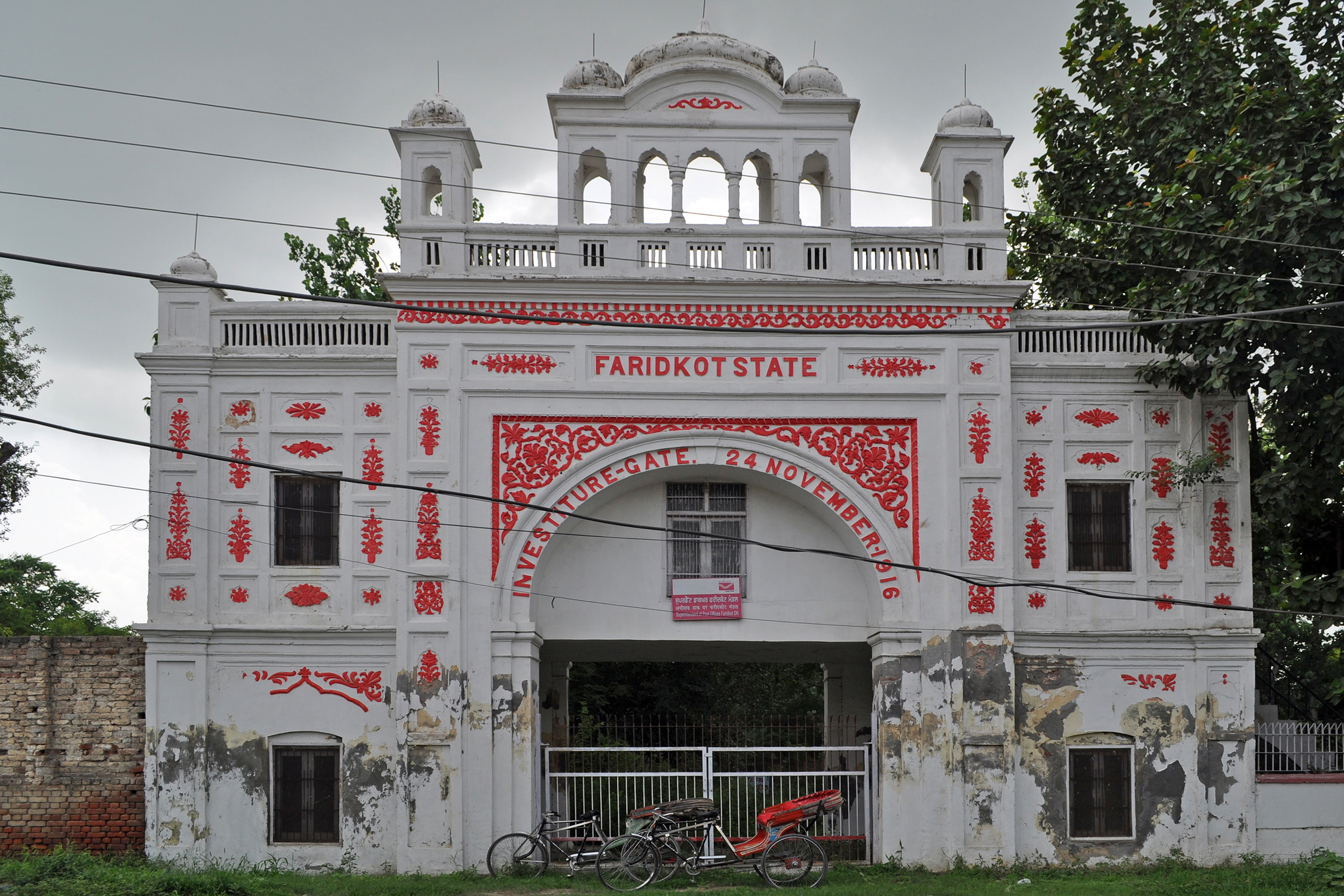
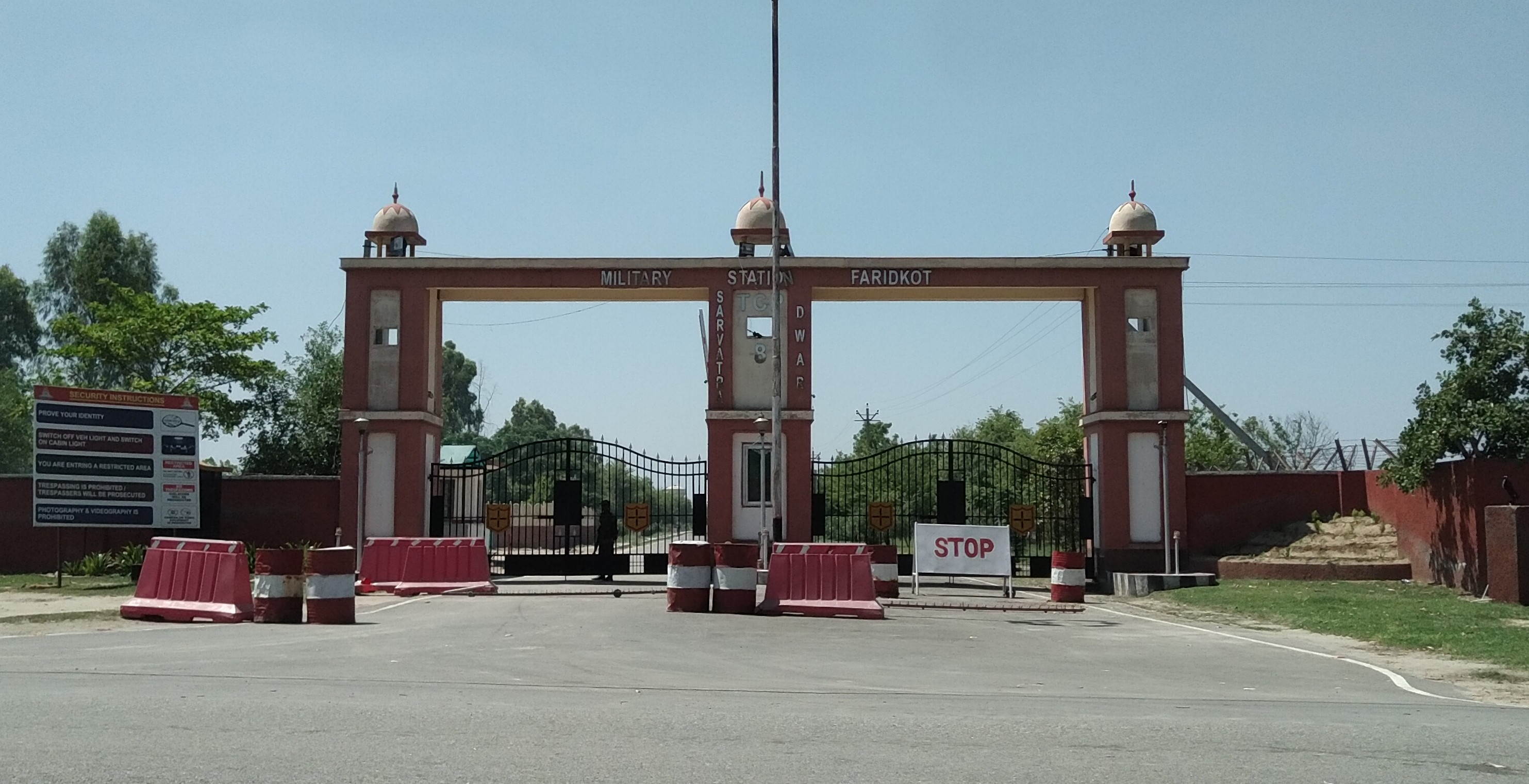
- Clockwise from top: Government Brijindra College in Faridkot, House in faridkot, Investiture Gate, Military Station
- Interactive map of Faridkot
- Location within Punjab Location within India
- Coordinates: 30.67°N 74.76°E
- Country: India
- State: Punjab
- District: Faridkot
- Established: 13th Century
- Founder: Raja Mokalsi

Government
  - Type: Municipal Council
  - Deputy Commissioner: Rahul Chaba IAS

Area
  - Total: 18.14 km^{2} (7.00 sq mi)
- Elevation: 196 m (643 ft)

Population (2011)
  - Total: 87,695
  - Density: 4,842/km^{2} (12,540/sq mi)
- Demonym: Faridkotian

Languages
  - Official: Punjabi
- Time zone: UTC+5:30 (IST)
- PIN: 151203
- Telephone code: +91-1639
- Vehicle registration: PB-04
- Sex ratio: 1000/890 ♂/♀
- Literacy: 72%
- Website: www.faridkot.nic.in

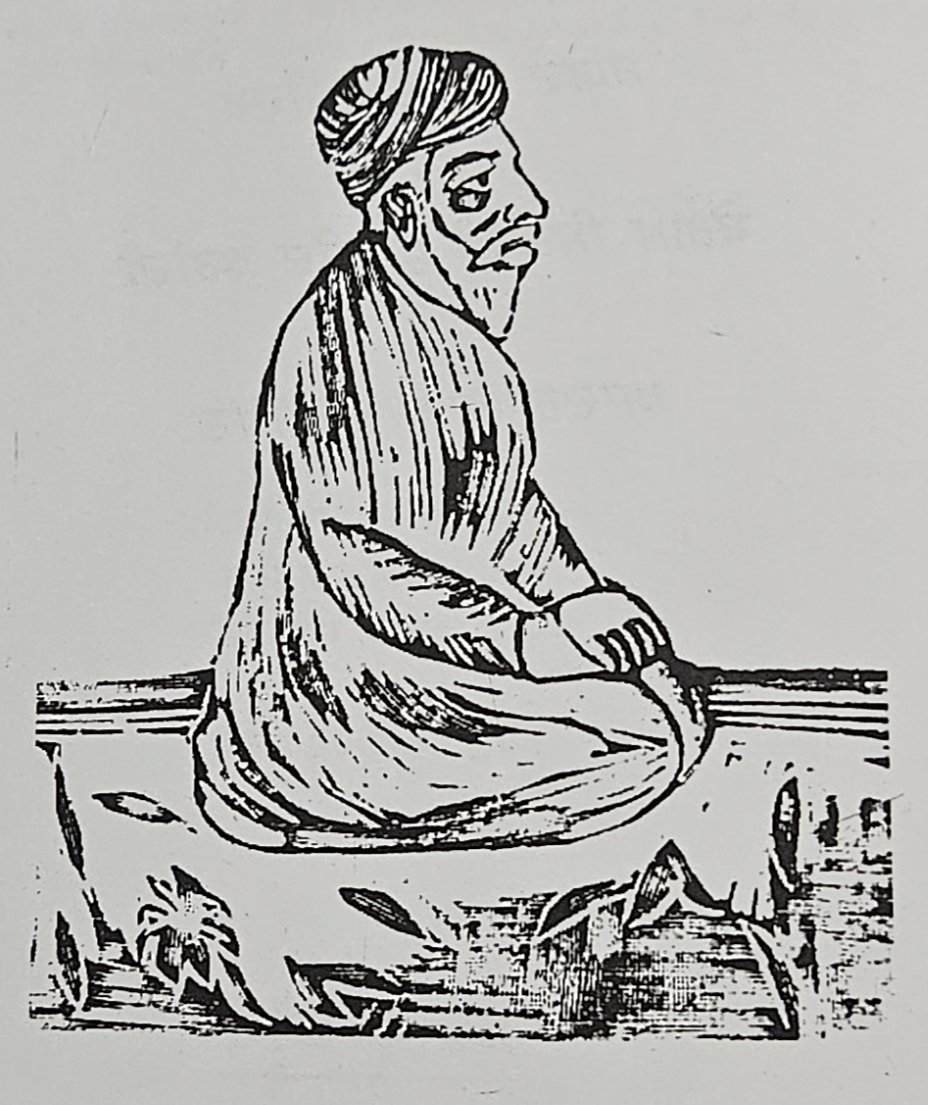
Mural depicting Baba Farid, dated to 1295 by G. B. Singh

Faridkot is a city in the south-western part of the state of Punjab, India. It serves as the headquarters for both the Faridkot district and the Faridkot Division. The division was established in 1995 at Faridkot which includes Faridkot, Bathinda, and Mansa district.

== Etymology ==
The city is named in the honor of Baba Farid, a revered 13th century Sufi saint whose shrine is located in Pakpattan, Pakistan. The town of Faridkot was founded during this century as Mokalhar (also spelt as Mokulhar) by Raja Mokalsi (also spelt as 'Moalsi'), the grandson of Rai Munj, a Bhatti Chief of Bhatnair, Rajasthan. According to a popular folklore, the Raja renamed Mokalhar to Faridkot after Baba Farid paid a visit to the town.

== History ==
=== Early history ===
Raja Mokalsi Manj, (Note: The name of Raja Mokalsi is alternatively rendered as 'Moalsi' or 'Mokulsi'.) a Bhatti Rajput chief from Rajasthan, established the town of Mokalhar in around 1200, which later became Faridkot after a visit to the locality by Baba Farid, possibly after an incident where Farid was briefly detained and then released by Raja Mokalsi's soldiers. The historic fort of Quila Mubarak has existed since the times of Baba Farid. Faridkot remained the capital during the reign of Mokalsi's son Jairsi and Wairsi.

An alternative theory is that the settlement of Faridkot was established by Bhallan of the Burai clan of the Jats during the reign of Akbar in the 16th century.

=== Faridkot State ===
Mughal authority in the Punjab region experienced a decline in the 18th century, which allowed for powerful Sikh chiefs to carve out their own kingdoms, with some of the ones in the Malwa region of Punjab being Patiala, Faridkot, and Nabha. The foundation of the modern city as a princely state was laid in 1763 by Hamir Singh. Sometime in 1803–1808, the city was briefly under the rule of Maharaja Ranjit Singh till 1809. It was restored to the reigning Brar family through British intervention via the Treaty of Amritsar (1809). Due to the Sikh Empire's attempted annexation of Faridkot State, many of the Sikh states located in the cis-Sutlej region of Punjab began allying themselves with the British East India Company to keep their powerful northern rival in-check. The Sikh chiefs believed that the Sikh Empire was their immediate threat and only recognized the British as a long-term threat that could be handled at a later time. Faridkot was restored to its local ruler Gulab Singh on 3 April 1809 as a result of the treaty. The town started to expand more earnestly beginning in the year 1837, when it became a capital of the state. During the First Anglo-Sikh war, the ruler of Faridkot, Pahar Singh, aided the British against the Lahore State, who in-turn gifted him the raja title and territory. When the policy of lapse was abolished in 1857, the princely-states were assigned a resident, however Faridkot did not have a resident assigned to it owing to its diminutive size, rather it was part of a provincial circle under a British representative.

Raja Harinder Singh, last ruler of Faridkot, established many educational institutions and constructed many prominent structures within the city. During the reign of the Faridkot rulers, many structures of various types were built in the city, such as the Faridkot Fort (including its decorated Shish Mahal), Raj Mahal, Clock Tower, and Grand Secretariat building. Some other historical buildings in the city are the Civil Secretariat, Darbar Gunj, Raj Mahal, Shahi Samadhan, Panchvati, Thakur Dwara, Gurudwara Godri Sahib, and Tilla Baba Farid. The last two rulers of the state came to the throne when they were minors, therefore affairs of the state were vested in a Council of Regency (1906–16) and Council of Administration (1918–34) until the monarch came of age. The arid region's economy relied mainly on rainwater to support is limited agriculture and the state's income was small compared to others. The economic fortunes of the region improved when the British constructed an irrigation system in 1885 by creating a branch of the Sirhind Canal that was fed by the Sutlej River.

=== Post-independence ===
After the merger between Faridkot State with Patiala & East Punjab States Union (PEPSU) in 1948, the city went into decline as it no longer was a capital of a princely-state but now an administrative headquarter of a subordinate unit. After the death of Raja Harinder Singh, his properties came to be managed by the Maharawal Khewaji Trust.

==== Creation of district ====
During the tenure of Giani Zail Singh, Faridkot was carved out as a separate district on 7 August 1972 out of the areas of erstwhile Bathinda District (Faridkot Tehsil) and Ferozepur District (Moga and Muktsar Tehsils), becoming the 12th district of the state. Further, in November 1995 the Faridkot District was trifurcated when two of its sub divisions viz. Muktsar and Moga were given the status of independent districts under the leadership of CM Harcharan Singh Brar of Muktsar. On 26 January 1996, Faridkot became the fourth revenue division of Punjab.

== Government body ==
The Municipal Council Faridkot came into existence in the year 1948 and now has a Class -I status. Uma Grover is the current President of the council and Gurdit Singh Sekhon of AAP is the member of Legislative Assembly from the town elected in 2017 headed by Mla Jastaj singh and rano maaj

== Geography ==
The average elevation of the city is 196 metres (643 ft). The town is located on the Punjab Plains, which in a macro regional context forms a part of greater Satluj Ganga plain. It is a low-lying flat area. The surface of the district is depositional plain which was formed by alleviation by the rivers flowing in these plains. Sirhind Feeder and Indira Gandhi Canal pass through the district. The topography of the district is plain, with only 1.4% of its area under forest cover.

== Demographics ==
As of 2011 India census, Faridkot had a population of 618,008 which constitute about 2% of the total population of Punjab. Males constitute 327,121 of the population and females 290,887.The population density in this district is 424 persons per km^{2}. Faridkot has an average literacy rate of 70.6%: male literacy is 75.9%, and female literacy is 64.8%.

Religious groups in Faridkot City (1881–2011) (Note: 1881–1941: Data for the entirety of the town of Faridkot, which included Faridkot Municipality.)
Religious group	1881		1901		1911		1921		1931		1941		2011	
Religious group	Pop.	%	Pop.	%	Pop.	%	Pop.	%	Pop.	%	Pop.	%	Pop.	%
Islam	3,241	49.16%	5,109	49.1%	5,464	46.81%	6,261	50.89%	8,605	51.35%	10,228	50.2%	470	0.54%
Hinduism	1,862	28.24%	3,358	32.27%	4,027	34.5%	3,649	29.66%	3,830 (Note: 1931–1941: Including Ad-Dharmis)	22.85%	4,742	23.27%	43,112	49.16%
Sikhism	1,226	18.6%	1,626	15.63%	1,854	15.88%	2,024	16.45%	3,865	23.06%	4,608	22.62%	42,652	48.64%
Jainism	264	4%	306	2.94%	327	2.8%	354	2.88%	434	2.59%	740	3.63%	741	0.84%
Christianity	—N/a	—N/a	6	0.06%	1	0.01%	16	0.13%	25	0.15%	50	0.25%	415	0.47%
Buddhism	—N/a	—N/a	0	0%	0	0%	0	0%	0	0%	—N/a	—N/a	65	0.07%
Others	0	0%	0	0%	0	0%	0	0%	0	0%	7	0.03%	240	0.27%
Total population	6,593	100%	10,405	100%	11,673	100%	12,304	100%	16,759	100%	20,375	100%	87,695	100%

== Transport ==
Faridkot city is well connected by road through National Highway 54. Faridkot railway station, located in the city lies on Bhatinda – Firozpur line. Many trains connect Faridkot to other major cities in Punjab and other states. The nearest airport, Bathinda Airport is located near Bathinda.

== Climate ==
The climate of Faridkot is mostly dry, characterized by a very hot summer, a short rainy season and a bracing winter. The cold season is from November to March. it is followed by the summer season which lasts up to the end of June. The period from July to the middle of September constitutes the southwest monsoon season. The later half of September and October is the post-monsoon or transition period. The temperature increases rapidly beginning with the end of March till June, which is the hottest month, with the mean daily minimum temperature about 41 °C or 105.8 °F and the mean daily minimum about 26.5 °C or 79.7 °F. The temperature is intensively hot during this period. The maximum temperature can go beyond 47 °C or 116.6 °F on some days. With the onset of the monsoon by the end of June or early July, there is an appreciable drop in the day temperature. After October, both the day and night temperatures decrease rapidly till January which is the coolest month. The mean daily maximum temperature in January is about 20 °C or 68 °F and the mean daily minimum about 4.5 °C or 40.1 °F.

The average annual rainfall in the district is 433 millimetres or 17 inches; about 71 percent of the annual rainfall in the district is received during the monsoon months July to September. Some rainfall occurs during the pre-monsoon months, mostly in the form of thundershowers. Weather is moderately cloudy during the monsoon season. During the rest of the year the skies are mostly clear. Wind speed is normally slow and flows in north to northwest, some times in southeast direction, throughout the year.

== Festivals ==
Every year, a Farid Mela festival, Aagman Purab, is held to commemorate the arrival of Baba Farid in Faridkot. The festival is held every year from 15–23 September by the Faridkot District Cultural Society. On 23 September, a grand parade departs from Tilla Baba Farid (Sikh Temple) and reaches Godari Sahib (Sikh Temple).

== Education ==
The city houses Baba Farid University of Health Sciences, which is the premier medical university of Punjab. Guru Gobind Singh Medical College and Hospital was established in the year 1978.Dasmesh Institute of Research & Dental Sciences is another medical school in the city. Government Brajindra College was set up in 1942 and Desh Bhagat Pandit Chetan Dev Government College of Education established in 1945 by the Faridkot Royalty. Dasmesh Public School, Faridkot, Baba Farid Public School, St. Mary's Convent School, Mount Litera Zee School, Dashmesh Global School, Baba Farid Law College, Delhi International School, Sangat Sahib Bhai Pheru Khalsa Sr. Sec. School, Balbir School and Dr. Mohinder Brar Sambhi Government Girls Sr. Sec. School are prominent schools in the town besides several other educational institutes. Kendriya Vidyalaya and New Model Sen. Sec School is also located in the town. Adesh Institute of Engineering and Technology is also situated in the city.

There are 96 private English language schools in the city.

== Economy ==
The local economy consists of industries like cotton ginning and baling, power-loom weaving, steel rolling, and metal founding. Manufacturing consists of agricultural implements, machine tools, bicycles, and sewing machines.

== Religious sites ==
- Gurdwara Tilla (Chilla) Baba Farid – believed to have been the resting place of Farid for forty days when he was going to Pakpattan.

== Hospitals ==
- Guru Gobind Singh Medical College, Faridkot
- Sant Baba Karnail Dass Medical Charitable Hospital, Vivek Ashram
- Dasmesh Institute of Research & Dental Sciences, Faridkot
- Civil Hospital, Faridkot
- Madhu Nursing Home, Faridkot
- Balbir Hospital, Faridkot
- Preet Hospital, Faridkot
- Sukhmani Hospital and Heart Care Centre

== Notable people ==
- Giani Zail Singh, a former President of India
- Sukhbir Singh Badal, a former Deputy Chief Minister of Punjab
- Muhammad Sadiq, a Member of Parliament (Lok Sabha)
- Sadhu Singh, a Member of Parliament (Lok Sabha)
- Kushaldeep Singh Dhillon, a former MLA
- Mantar Singh Brar, a former MLA
- Rupinder Pal Singh, a hockey player
- Ihana Dhillon, an actress
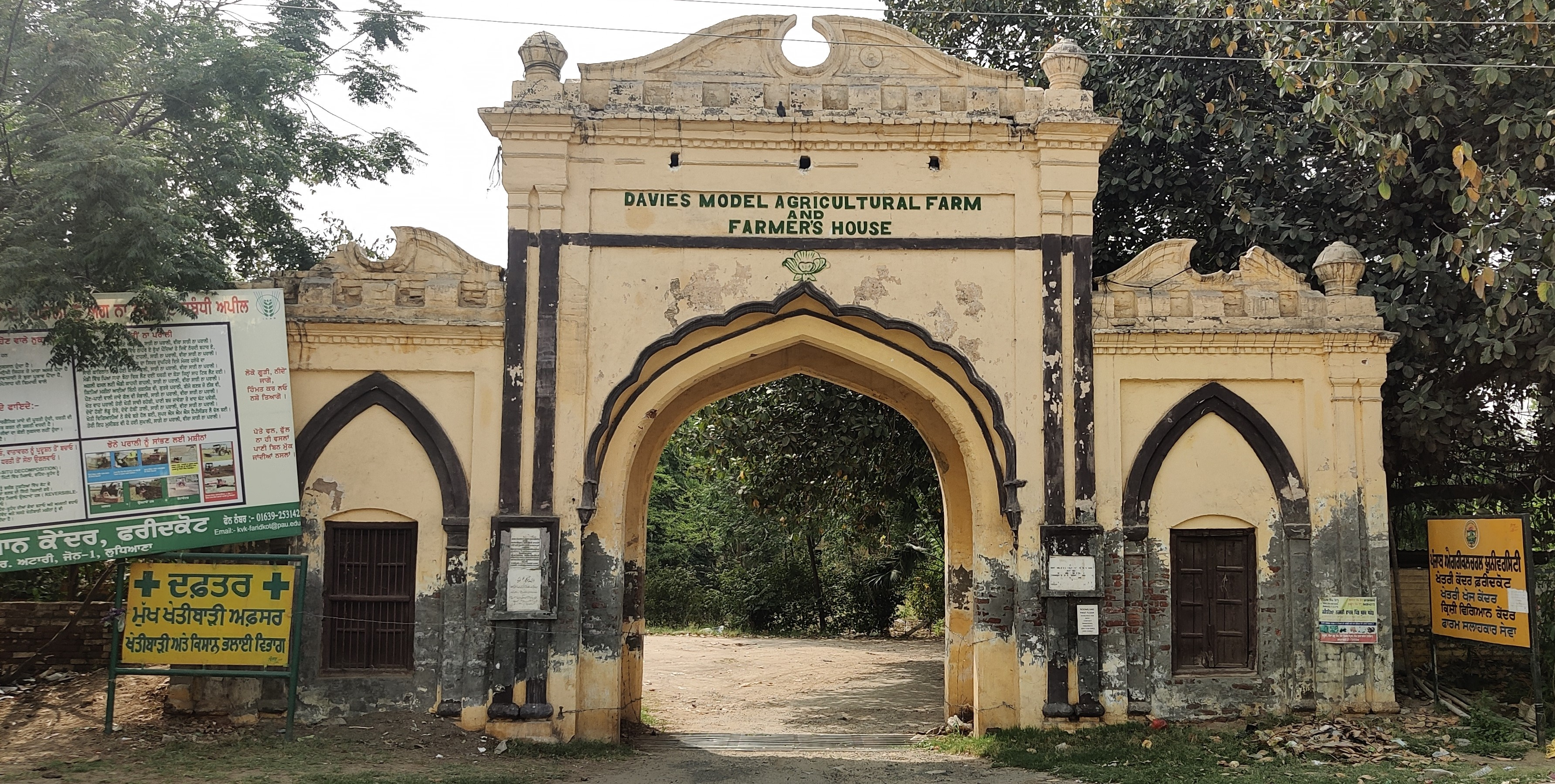
Entrance of Farmer's House Faridkot

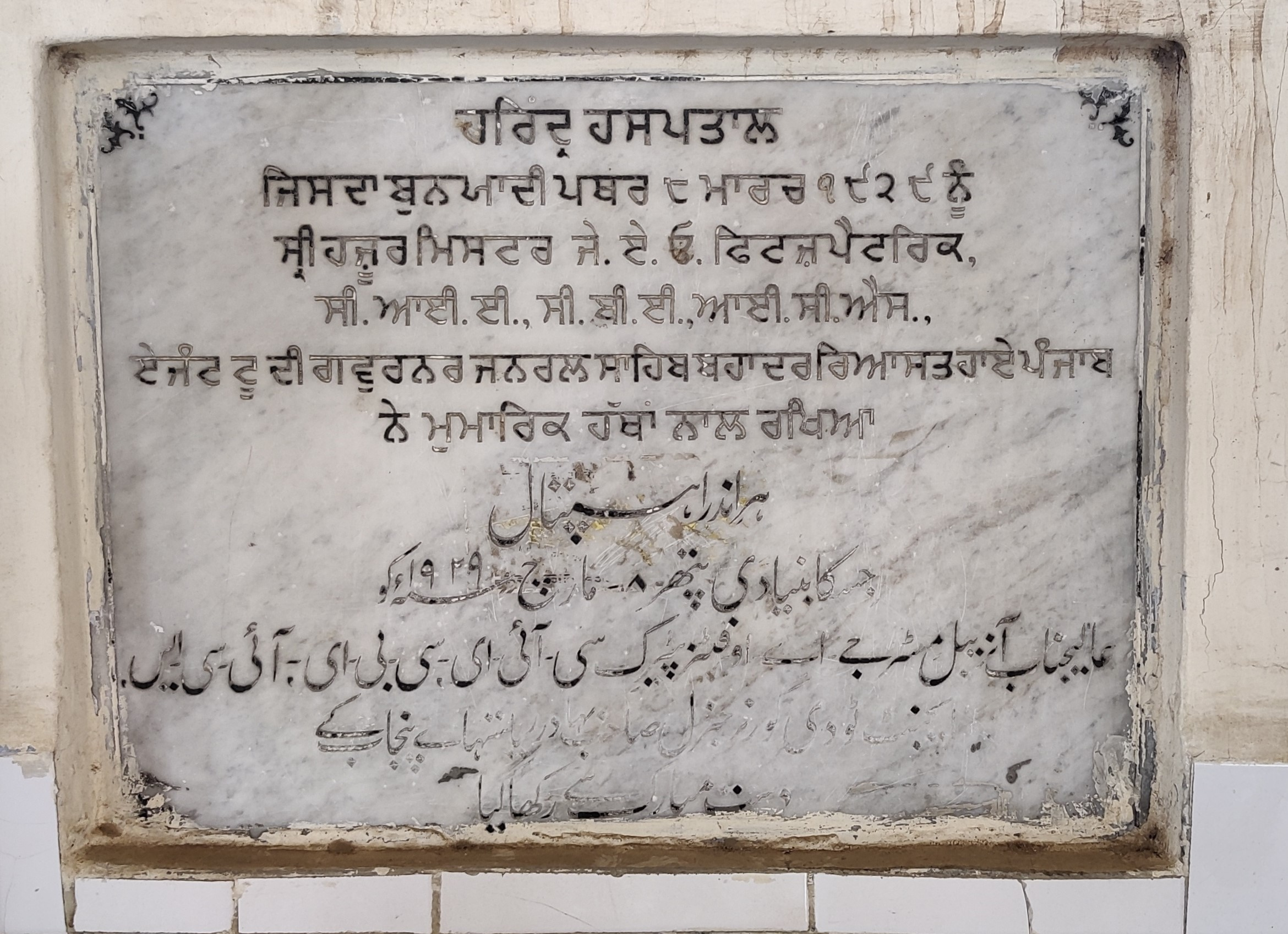
Foundation Stone of Harindra - Civil Hospital Faridkot

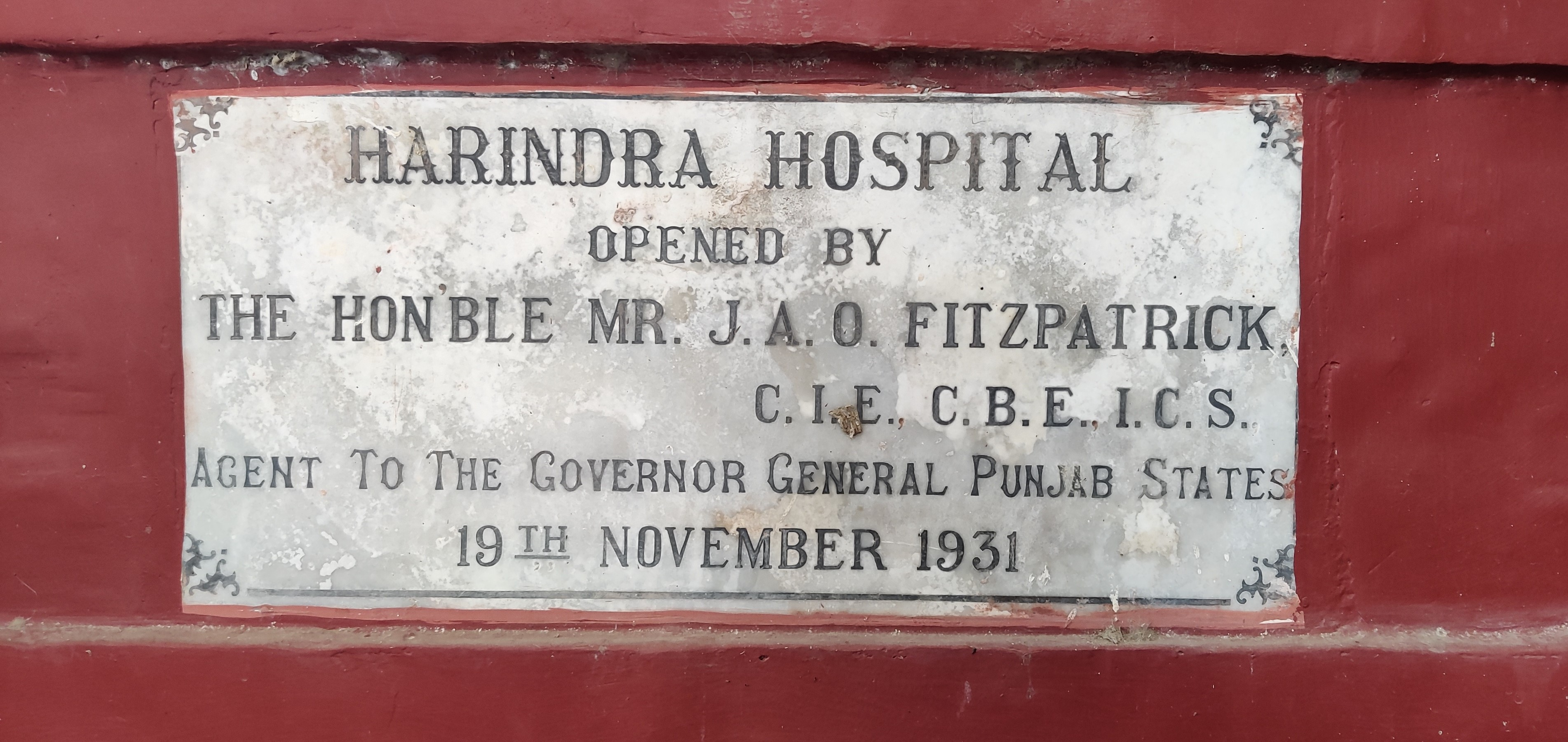
Foundation Stone of Harindra - Civil Hospital Faridkot

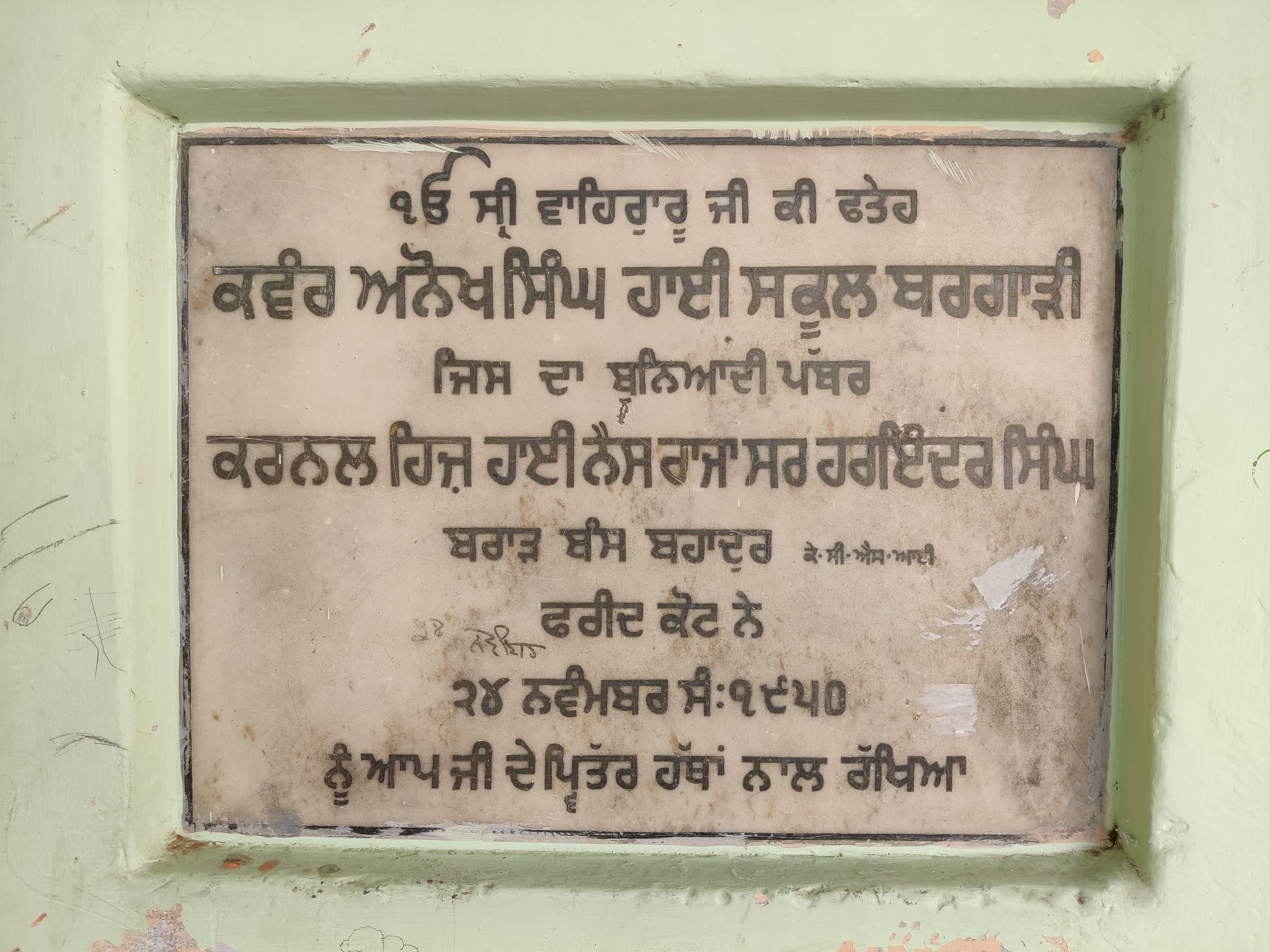
Foundation stone of Govt. School of Bargari (Faridkot)

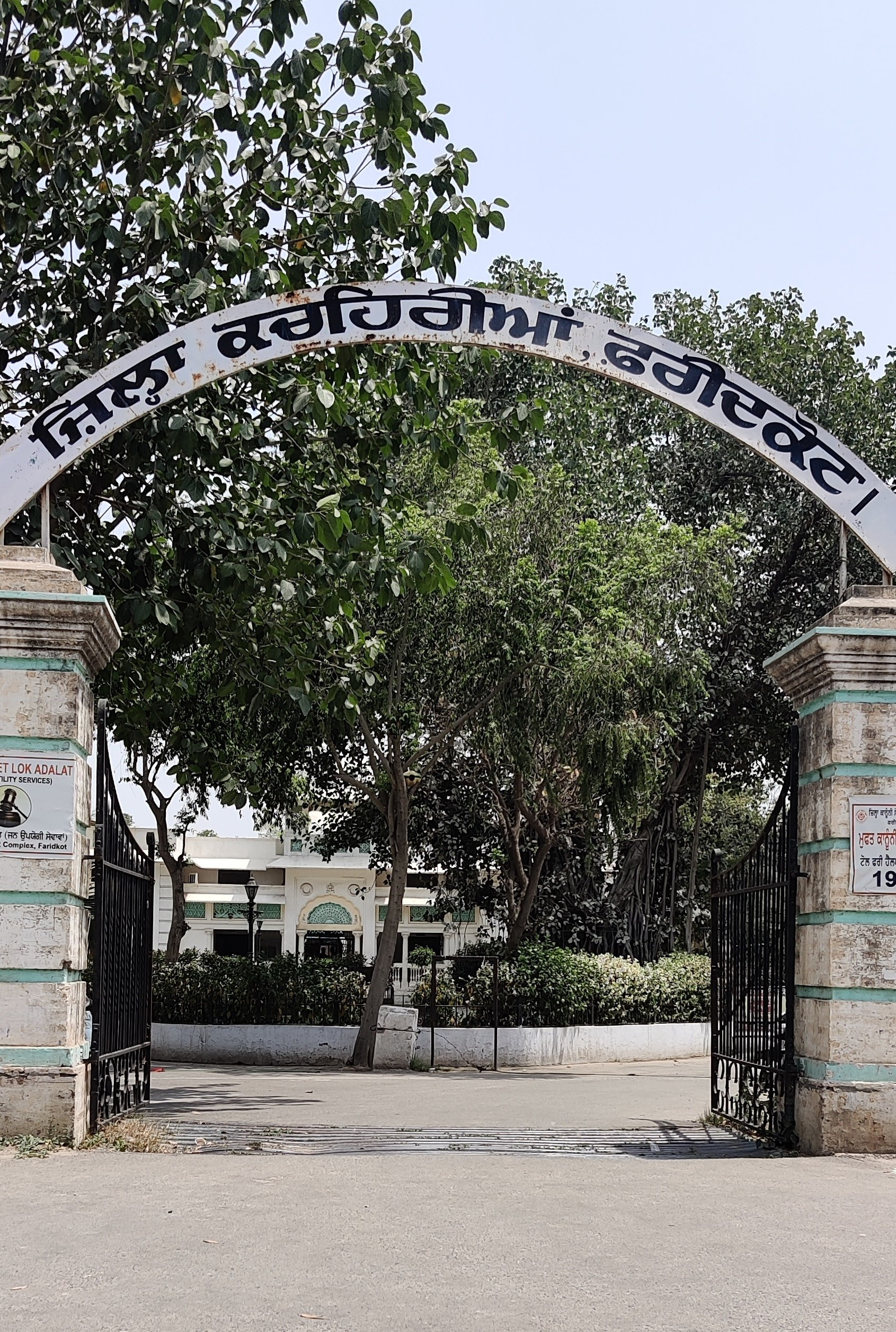
Entrance of District Court Faridkot

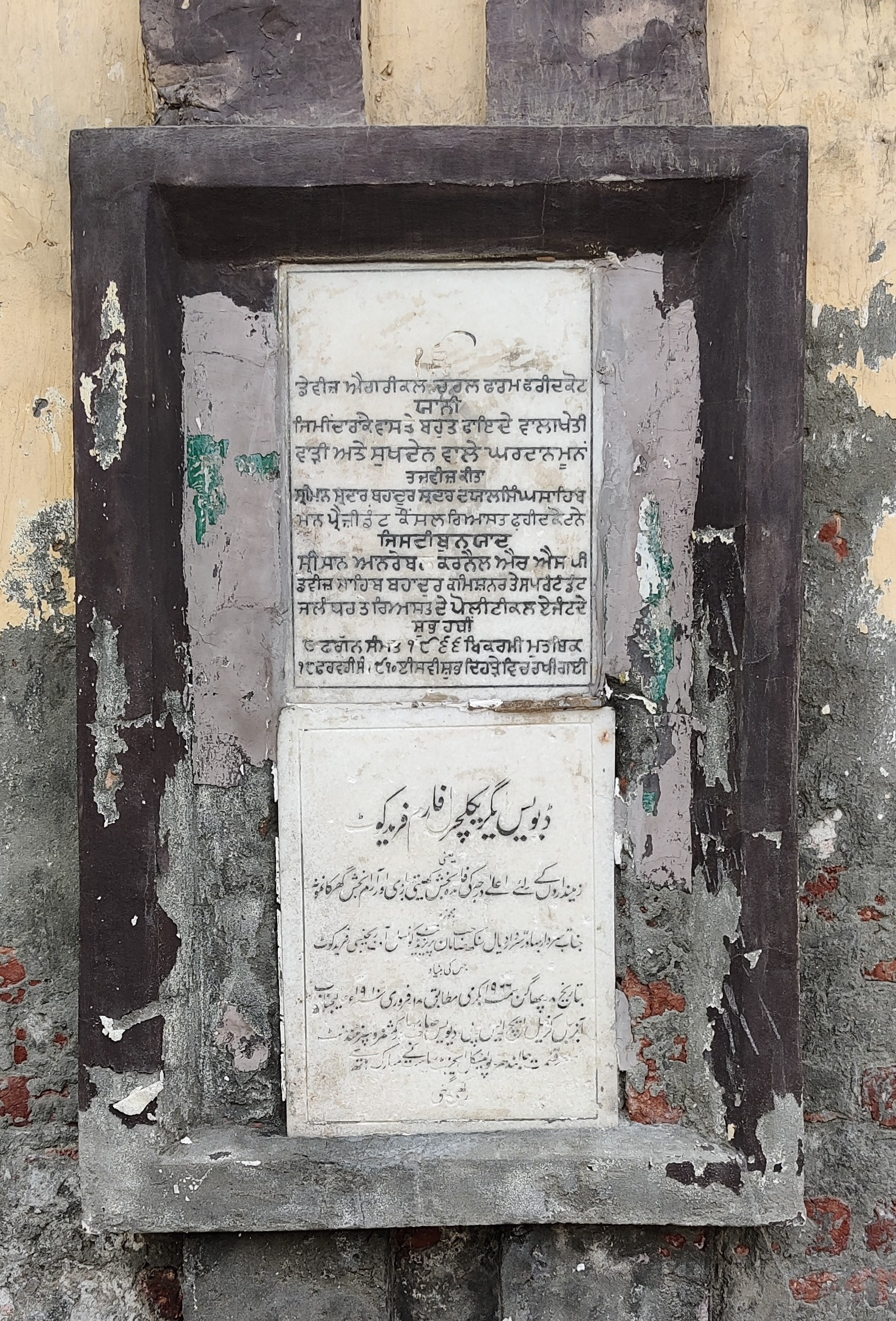
Foundation Stone of Davies Model Agricultural Farm and Farmers's House Faridkot

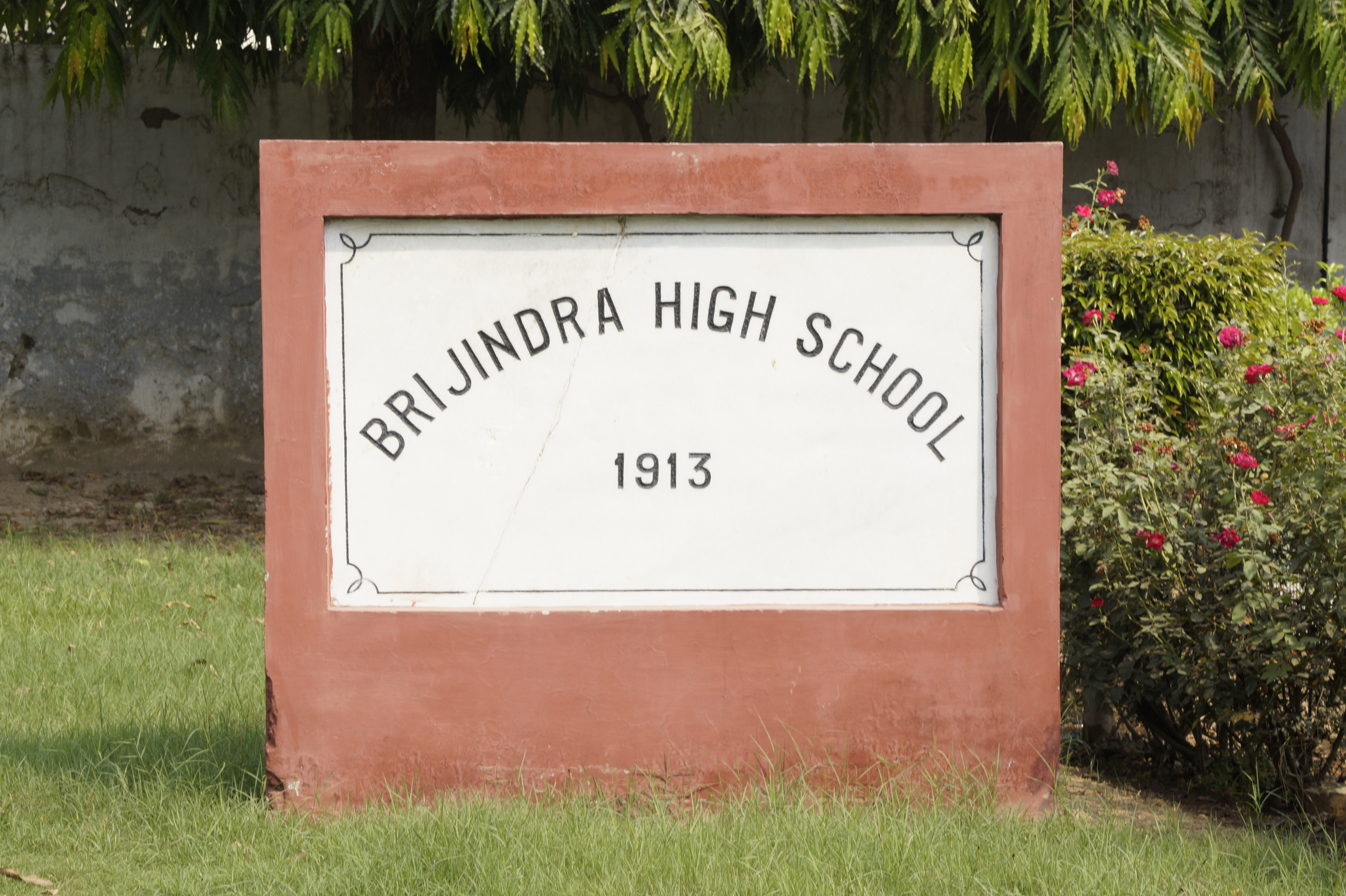
Govt. Brijindra College Faridkot

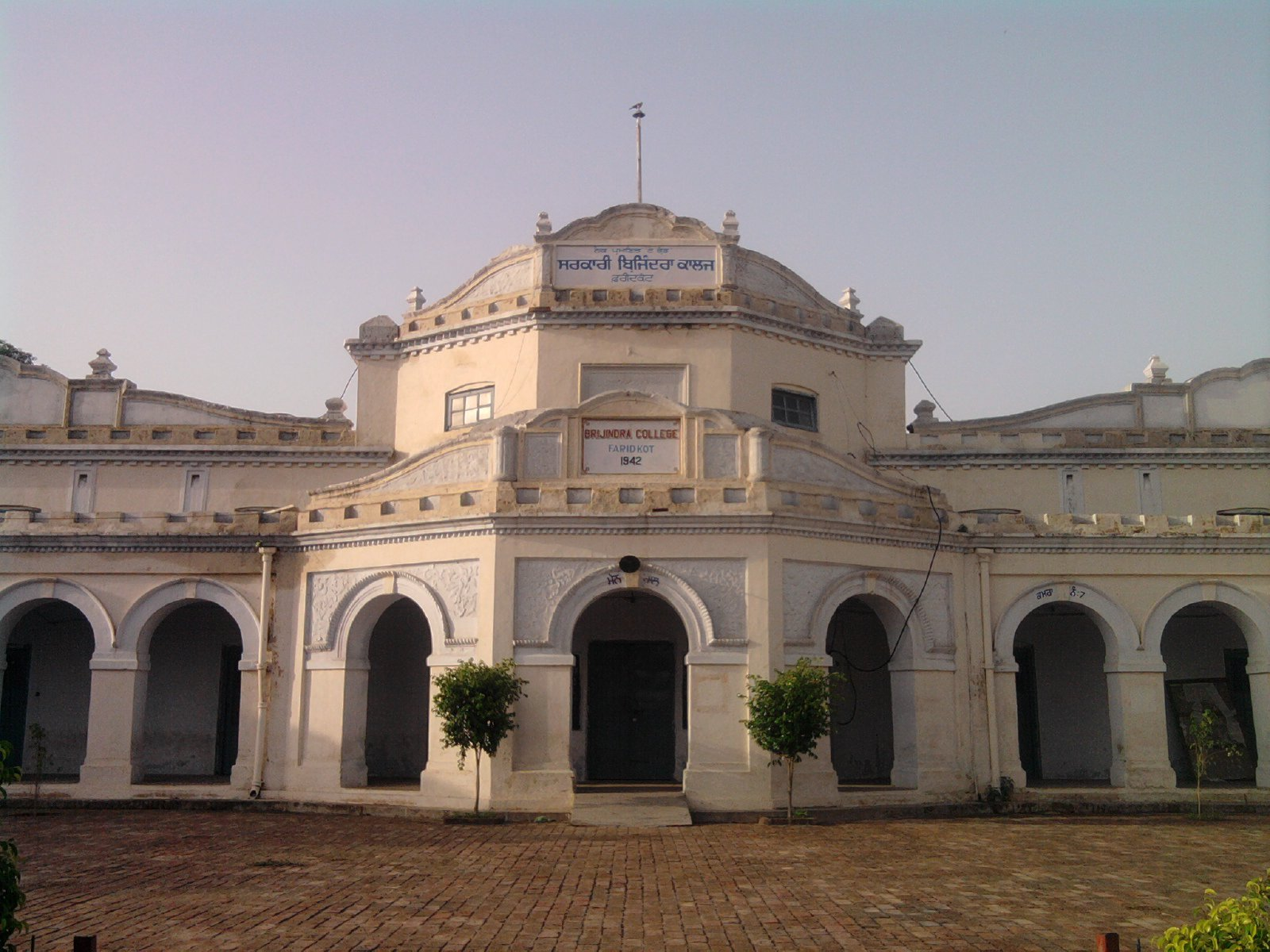
Govt.Brijindra College Faridkot

== See also ==
- Faridkot State
- Patiala State
- Bathinda
- Bathinda district
