= Dhaliwal =

Dhaliwal may refer to:

== Villages in Punjab, India ==
- Dhaliwal, Nakodar, Jalandhar district
- Dhaliwal Bet, Kapurthala district
- Dhaliwal Dona, Kapurthala district
- Mand Dhaliwal, Kapurthala district

== Other uses ==
- Dhaliwal (surname)

== See also ==
- Dhariwal (disambiguation)
