= Bhagsar =

Village in Punjab, India

Coordinates: 29°07′N 73°27′E

Bhagsar is a town situated 14 km west of Muktsar, Punjab, India.

== Origin of name ==
There was a water pond near Muktsar, where groups of people from far off places used to come to graze their cattle. One such group was of the "Brar" clan who used to come from Doda Pargana. They considered it a fortunate place as it had water all throughout the year and the pond was surrounded by a large number of trees which included 52 Pipal trees. The word Bhagsar is derived from two words "BHAG" meaning fortune and "SAR" meaning a water, thereby meaning the fortunate water. Earlier, it was also known as "BHAGPURI DHAB". Dhab also means a water reservoir.

== History ==
Bhup Singh and Kapoor Singh were the founders of the village and later on Rai Singh s/o Alla Singh also joined them. Three pattis in the village are named after 3 brothers Alla Singh, Kapoor Singh and Bhup (Bamu) Singh. The village allotment deed was signed by S. Sher Singh, King of Faridkot state after receiving 1 camel & 1 mohar as nazrana on 18 Phagun 1893 Bikarmi Samat i.e. 2–3 March 1837. After 8 yrs of founding the village, Jai Singh brother of Rai Singh was killed by his cousin from a resident of Bamu patti. The descendants of Rai Singh shifted and founded another village Lakhewali. A year before the settlement, Rai Singh came back to Bhagsar and claimed his land rights in the village and also kept his share in land at Lakhewali. The place where this fight took place is on the eastern side of the village where a shrine has been erected in his memory. Bhagsar village was part of Faridkot princely State during its inception. In 1964, consolidation (murbabandi) took place. The village became part of Ferozpur District in Nov, 1884. The subdivision headquarters of the village was Fazilka until 1949-50 and after that it was in Muktsar subdivision. In 1972, it was made part of the newly created Faridkot district with Muktsar as subdivision headquarters. In the year 1995, another district Muktsar was carved, and it was made part of it. At present, the village falls in Malout (reserve) assembly constituency and Firozpur Lok Sabha (Parliamentary) constituency. The tehsil and block headquarters are at Muktsar. The sub tehsil is at Lakhewali. It falls under Lakhewali police Station. It is situated between 30°26′30″06 N latitude and 74°24′09″02 E longitude and is 195.18 metres above sea level. The postal PIN code is 152026.

== Demographics ==
The population of the village bhagsar consists of different castes among which Brar Jats (The founders) are prominent followed by Dhaliwals. The Dhaliwals (Relatives of Alla patti) came from Chand Bhan village near Jaitu. Along with them too came another family of BRARs. There are few households of Bhullars and Dhillons. The village has large population of different Schedule Castes and Backward classes. The prominent caste among schedule castes are Majbi Sikhs, Bavaria, Julahas, Ramdasias, Khatiks & Chamihars. The Khatiks came from Alwar district of Rajasthan in 1899 and started making bricks in the village. The Backward classes consists of Naies, Khati, Mehra and Bhatth. The total population as per the 2011 census is about 7650 with 1504 households. The total area of the village is 7142 acres out of which 6898 is under cultivation. The hadbast no. of the village is 51. There are 5 polling booths in the village with 2476 male 2222 female and total of 4698 voters as on 1 January 2012. The majority population follows path of Sikhism.

== Schools ==
- 1899 - Primary school, For Boys & girls
- 1957 - Middle school
- 1958 - Middle school(Girls)
- 1959 - High school(co-ed)
- 1991 - Senior Secondary
- 1995 - High school for Girls
- 2001 - Senior Secondary for Girls
- 2010 - Model School (Co-ed)

Besides the above government and government aided schools, St. Thomas school is a school up to class 10 run by Christian Missionaries.

Punjab National Bank established its branch in the village on 16.10.1974. The bank code is 1234 & RTGS code is PUNB0123400. As the village is very large, it has two Gurudwaras, one on the canal Bank and another in Bhamu patti. The village also has a church, a Dera & Baba Tirkara.
