= Qila Mubarak =

Qila Mubarak may refer to three distinctive historical sites associated with Sikh and Indo-Islamic architectural heritage. These forts were primarily established by the rulers of the Phulkian dynasty.

- Qila Mubarak, Bathinda historical monument in the city of Bathinda in Punjab, India
- Qila Mubarak, Patiala, fortress of Sikh architecture in Patiala, Punjab, India.
- Qila Mubarak, Faridkot

== See also ==
- Qila Rai Pithora, fortified complex in present-day Delhi, which includes the Qutb Minar complex.
