= Soneri Mahal =

17th-century palace in Aurangabad

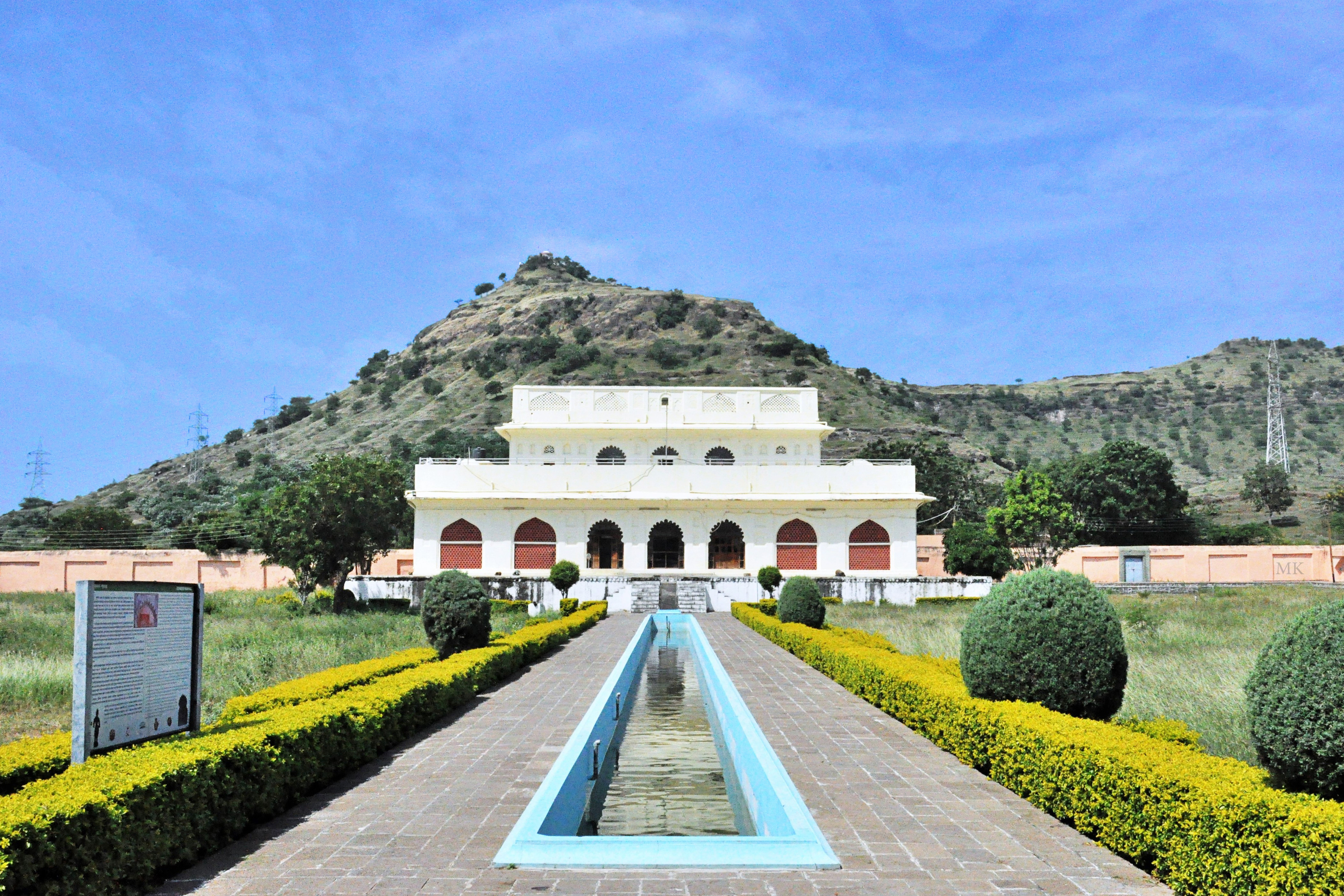

- Location in Maharashtra, India Soneri Mahal (India)
- 19°54′24″N 75°18′32″E
- Location: Jaisingpura, Aurangabad, Maharashtra, India

History
- Founder: Pahadsingh (Envoy of Shah Jahan)
- Built: 1651 (375 years ago)

Site notes
- Architectural styles: Mughal and Rajput architecture

Soneri Mahal (Marathi pronunciation: [soˑneˑriˑ m(ə)ˑhaːlˑ]; lit. "Golden Palace"), is a historic monument located in Aurangabad, Maharashtra, India, situated in the Satmala mountain range. It is near Dr. Babasaheb Ambedkar Marathwada University, and currently serves as the home of the Maharashtra State Museum for Aurangabad.

== History ==
Historical records indicate that Mughal emperor Shah Jahan sent Pahad Singh and Juzar Singh to the Deccan region. During Aurangzeb's rule, Pahad Singh demonstrated his loyalty to the Mughal Empire, eventually relocating to Aurangabad during this period.

The palace was constructed sometime in the 1650s AD. In 1934, the estimated value of the palace was assessed, and it was sold to the then Nizam of Hyderabad, Mir Mahbub Ali Pasha, for 26,400 rupees.

== Architecture ==
The main building is situated along the ridge of a hill and is surrounded by trees, gardens, and fields. The palace is believed to have originally featured paintings made with real gold, which inspired its name. The entrance is a robust structure fortified with defensive features. The Hathikhana Gate, adorned with ornate arches and intricate carvings, serves as the main access point to the palace.

A central pathway extends from this gate to the main palace, flanked by gardens on both sides. At the center of the pathway lies a large rectangular water reservoir, which was meticulously reconstructed by craftsmen in 2001–2002. This restoration adhered to the principles of Mughal architecture, aiming to preserve the historical authenticity of the site.

The Soneri Mahal is a rectangular, symmetrical structure built on a raised platform. The ground floor features a columned balcony along with four additional openings, providing both aesthetic appeal and ventilation. The second floor houses a central hall, also flanked by four openings, enhancing its balanced design. A staircase, positioned along the south–north axis in the southern section of the building, leads upward, culminating in a decorative pinnacle. Constructed using stone, brick, and lime plaster, the Soneri Mahal showcases a blend of durability and architectural elegance.

The monument is a notable example of the fusion of Rajput and Mughal architectural styles. It is a protected monument under the Ancient Monuments and Archaeological Sites and Remains Act, 1962, and it stands as a valuable piece of Maharashtra's architectural heritage. It has been the venue for several events, including the Ajanta-Ellora festival, and more recently as a part of India's G20 tourism drive in Aurangabad. The palace also has a library, and a small history museum displaying old statues, coins, and ancient manuscripts.

=== Museum ===
The first-floor gallery of the palace, which was established in 1979, houses the Regional Museum. This museum showcases a diverse collection of ancient artifacts across various categories. It includes ancient sculptures, paintings, coins, pottery, arms, and armour, and more. It houses terracotta artifacts, wooden sculptures, and glass paintings, among other items, which were excavated from various sites in and around Marathwada. The second floor of the museum currently houses the office of the Assistant Curator of the Archaeology Department, Government of Maharashtra.

=== Lala Hardaul Samadhi ===
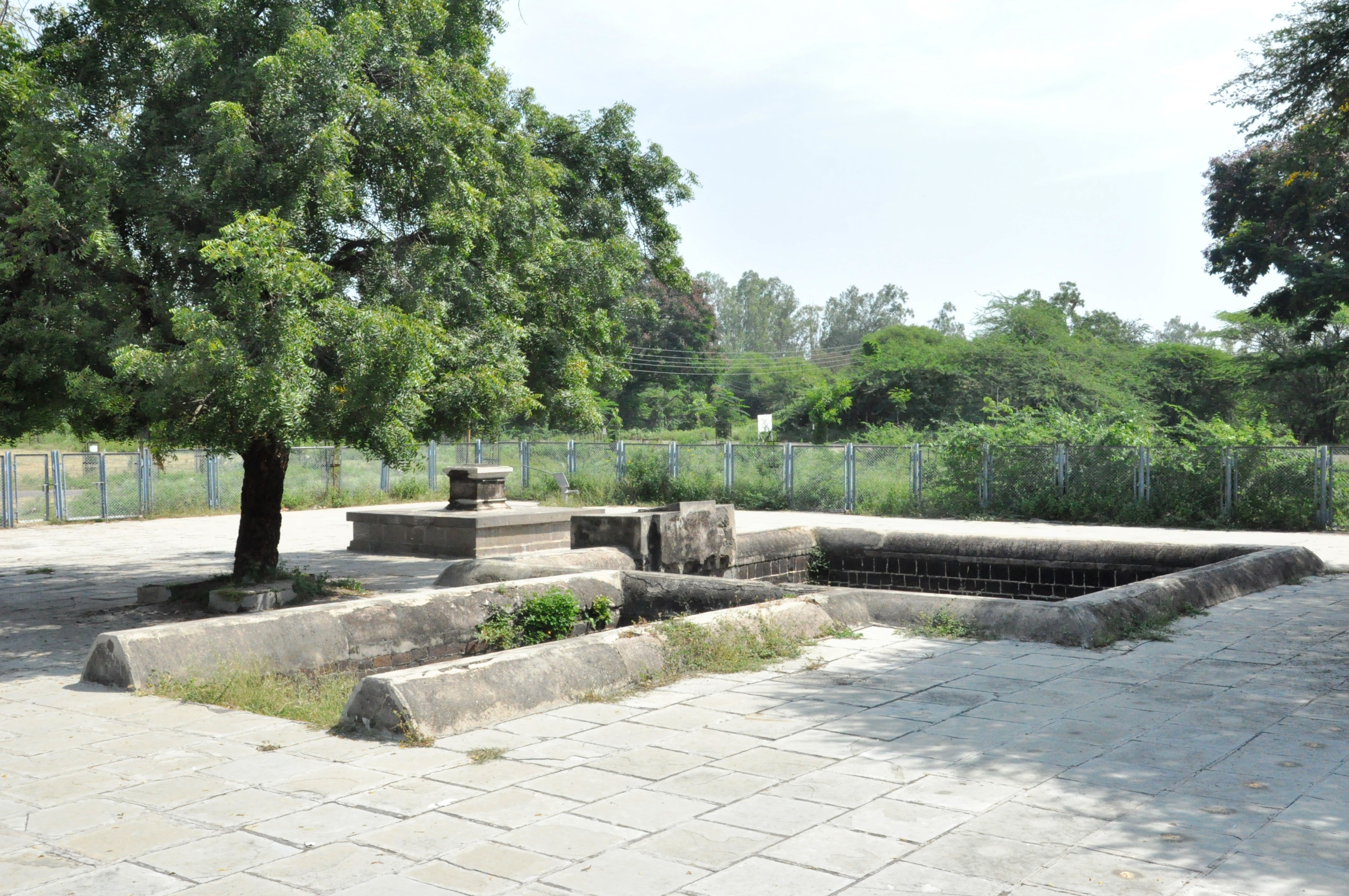
Lala Hardaul Samadhi, Soneri Mahal

Lala Hardaul was a freedom fighter and skilled warrior, the son of Bundelkhand's Orcha Naresh Veersingh. A samadhi (memorial) dedicated to him is located 50 meters from the palace. The memorial is in the form of a square platform. This location in Bundelkhand's history is known for the extraordinary valor and bravery of Lala Hardaul. He is said to have fiercely resisted the Mughal authority, instilling fear in their ranks.

Hardaul's bravery and courage are still celebrated in the Bundelkhand region. His untimely demise is attributed to his consumption of poison on the occasion of the Vijayadashami festival in 1631, fearing his impending capture by Mughal forces. His memorial contains an inscription in both Marathi and Urdu, which mentions him by name.

Due to his significant role in Indian history, the memorial has been declared a State Protected Monument by the Archaeology Department of the Government of Maharashtra and was recently renovated.

== Gallery ==
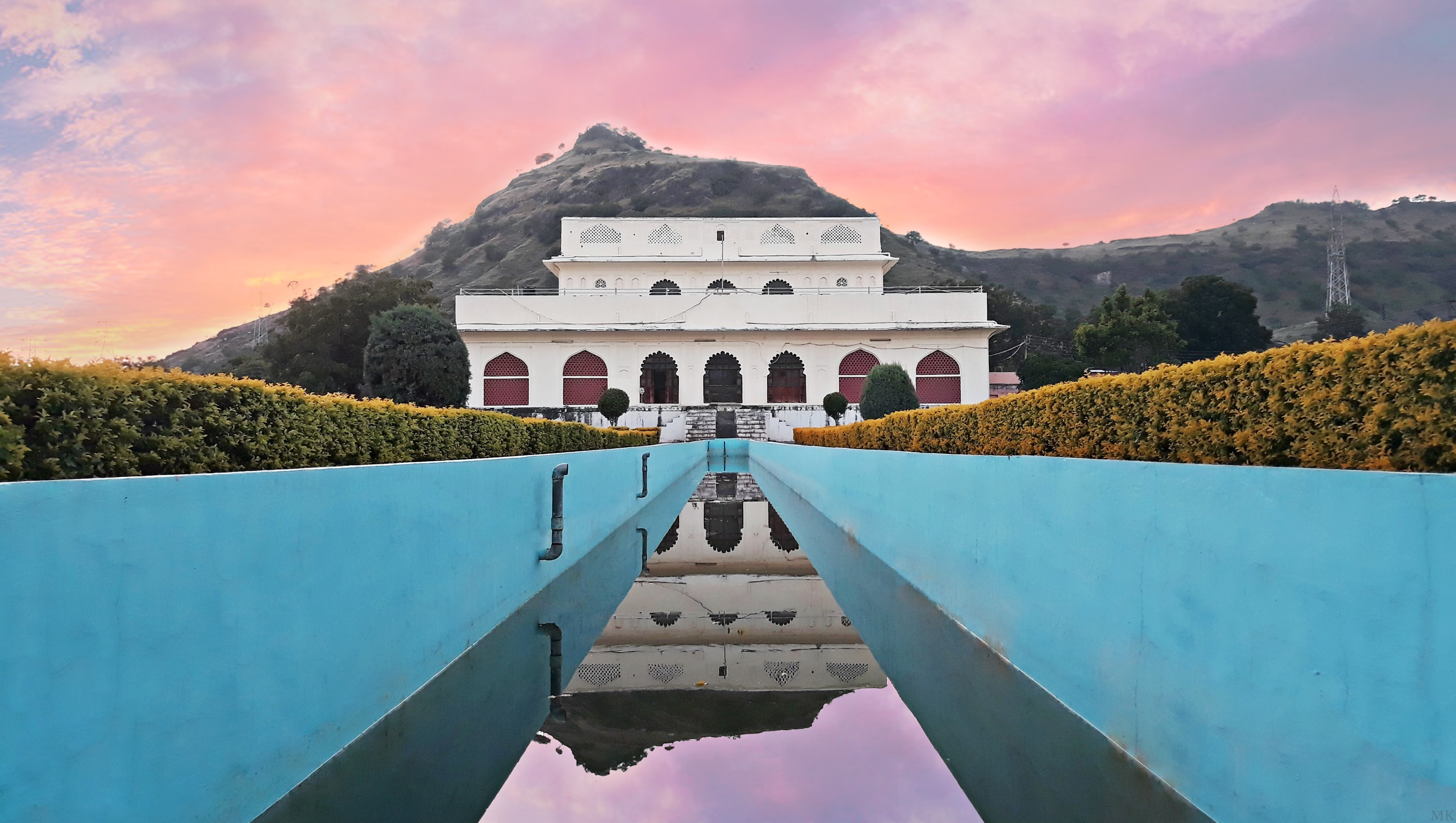
At sunset

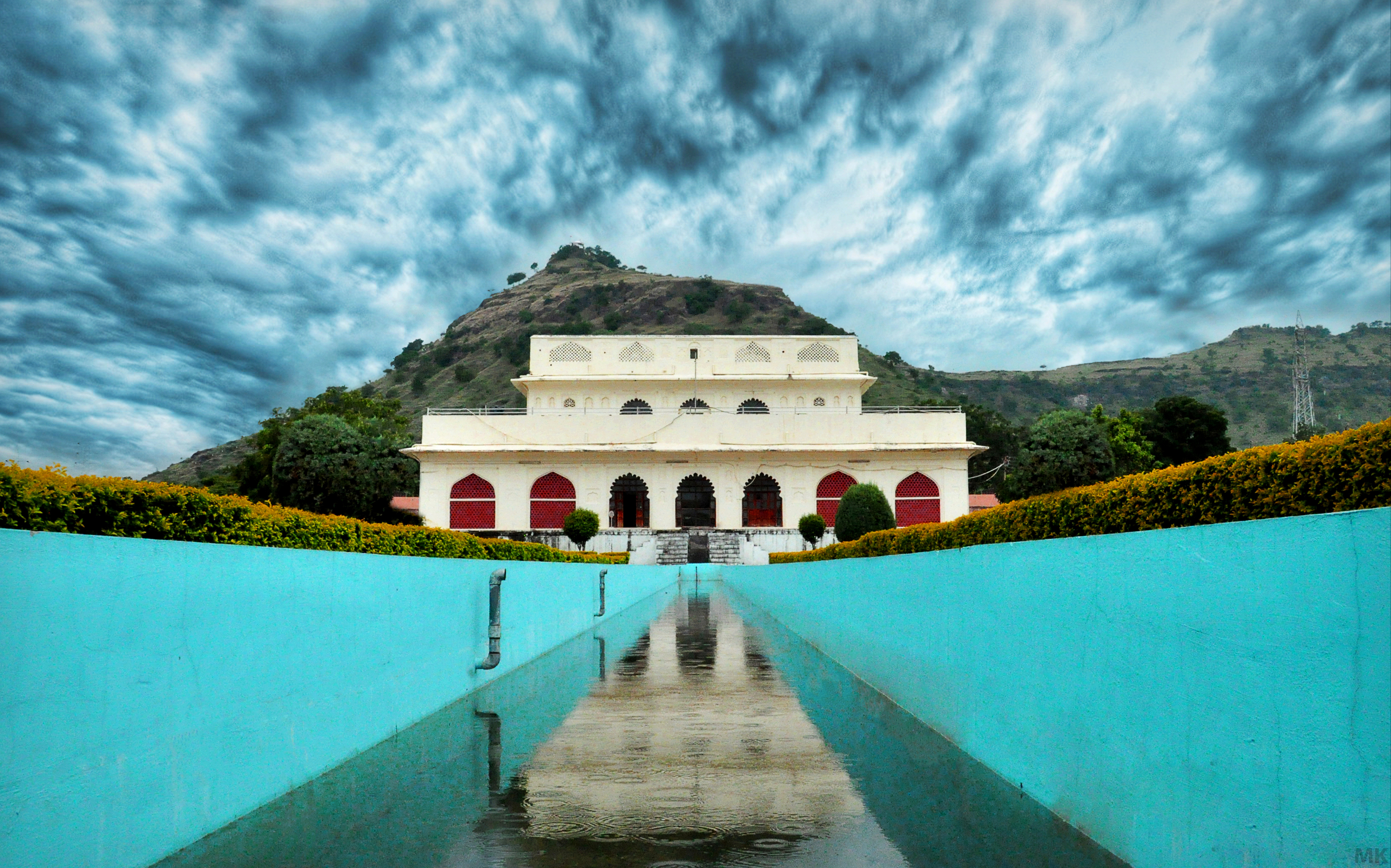
During the day

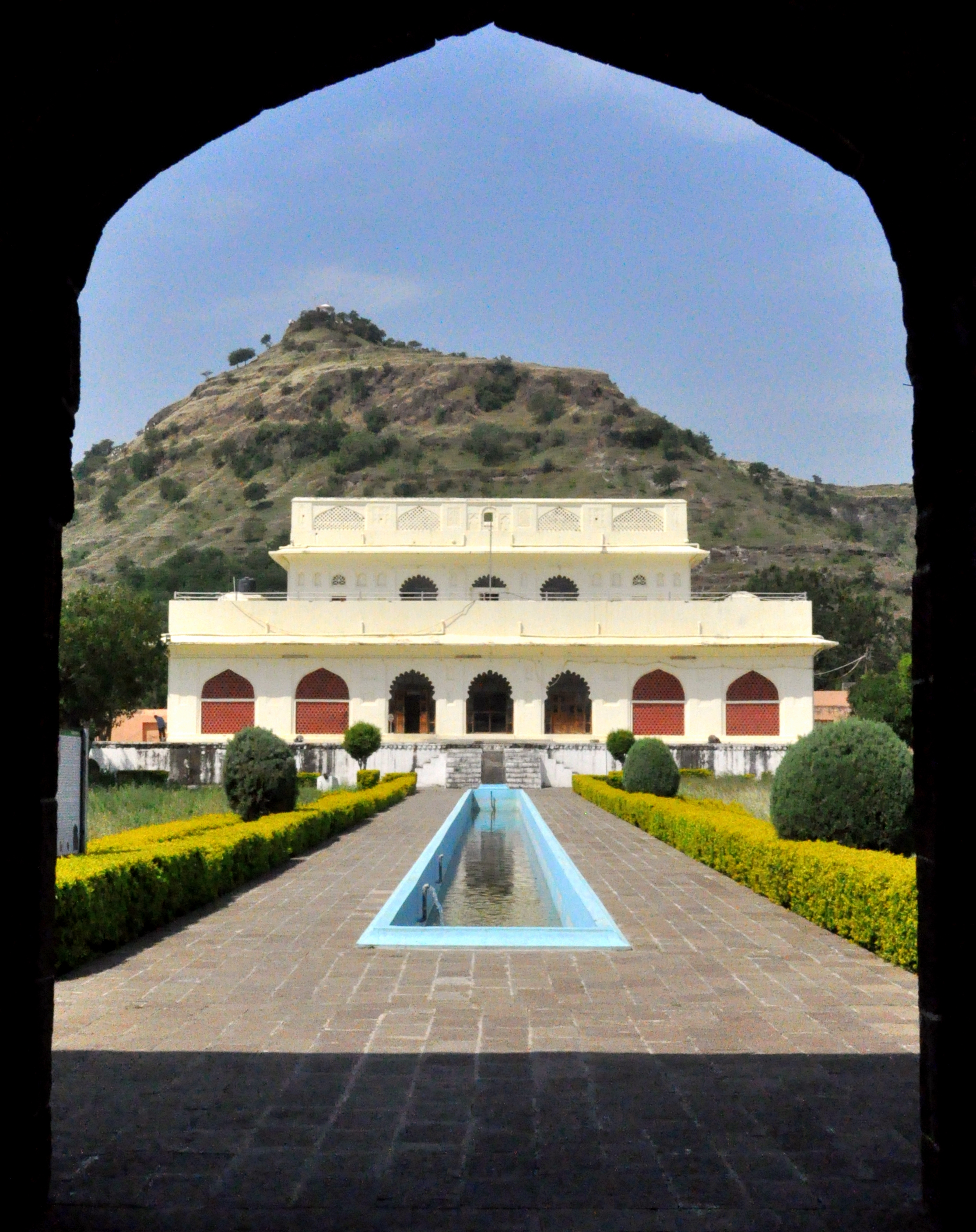
View from the Hathikhana gate

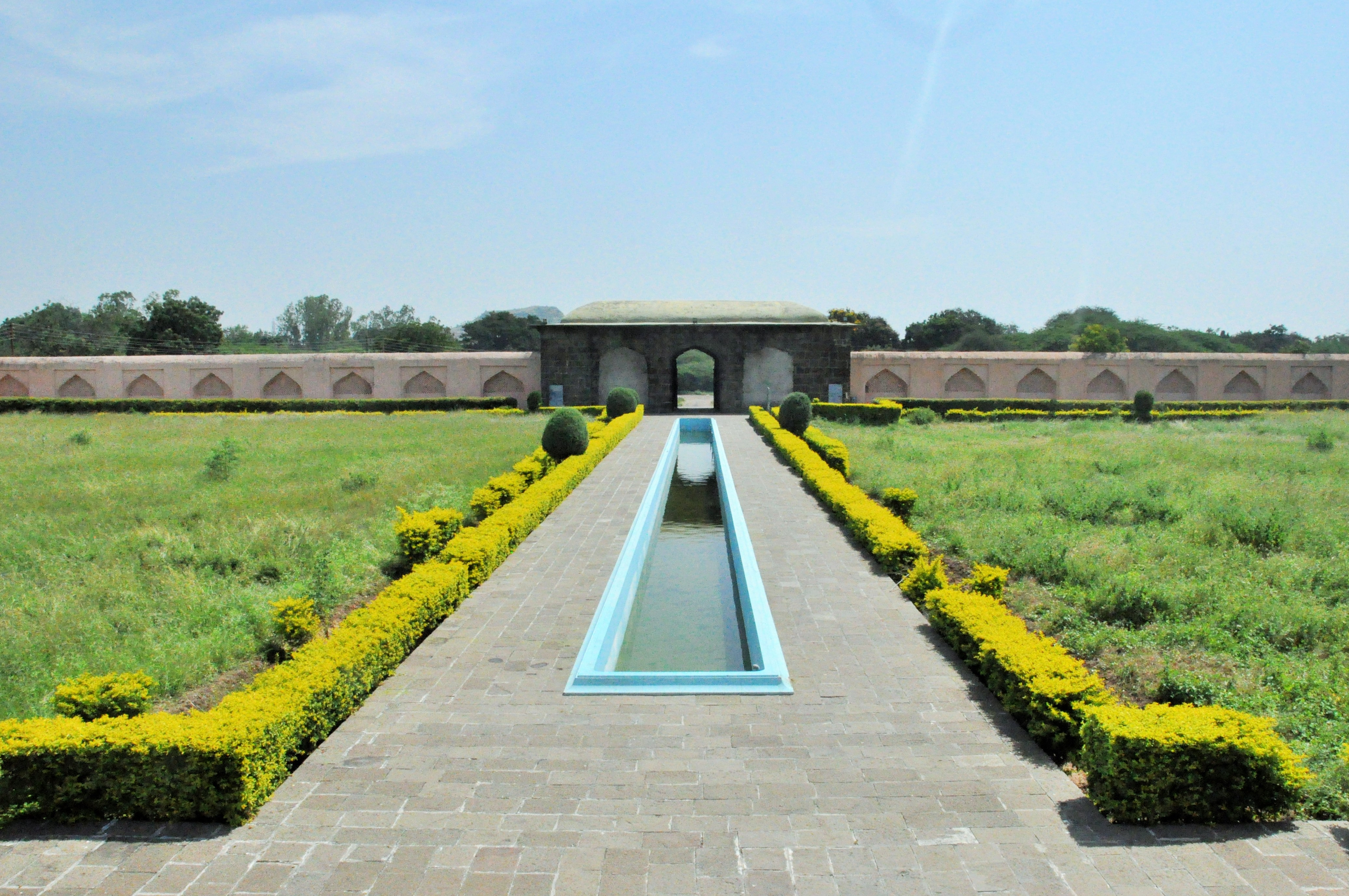
The Hathikhana fountain
