= Dhariwal =

Dhariwal may refer to:

- Dhariwal (clan)
- Dhariwal, India, a town in Gurdaspur district, Punjab, India
- Dhariwal, Pakistan
- Dhariwal Infrastructure Limited, a subsidiary of Calcutta Electric Supply Corporation
  - Dhariwal Power Station or CESC Chandrapur Thermal Power, a coal-based thermal power plant near Tadali, Maharashtra, India

== See also ==
- Dhaliwal (disambiguation)
