= Mahian Wala Kalan =

Coordinates: 30°56′27″N 74°57′04″E

Mahian Wala Kalan is a village in Zira tehsil of Firozpur district, Punjab, India. The population of village is near 3000. The village has 1603 voters which is ranked second in Zira constituency.

The village includes an Indian Government school named "Jawahar Navodaya Vidyalaya", also a girls' college established by the village Bhagat Duni Chand committee, and NRIs. The college is named "Bhagat Duni Chand Girls College". The pind has a stadium, cemetery, primary public school, and Oriental Bank of Commerce branch, and its own Post Office. It is a well established pind, mainly inhabited by Gill, Dhaliwal and Brars.
