= Madhoshi =

- Directed by: Tanveer Khan
- Written by: Tanveer Khan
- Produced by: Anil Sharma
- Starring: Bipasha Basu; John Abraham; Priyanshu Chatterjee; Naina Dhaliwal
- Cinematography: Damodar Naidu
- Music by: Roop Kumar Rathod
- Distributed by: Shweta International
- Release date: 24 September 2004
- Country: India
- Language: Hindi

Madhoshi (English: Intoxication) is a 2004 Indian Hindi-language psychological thriller film. It was directed by Tanveer Khan in his directorial debut, and stars Bipasha Basu, John Abraham, Shweta Tiwari and Priyanshu Chatterjee.

== Plot ==
Anupama Kaul is a woman whose sister lives in New York. One day she gets a call from her sister, and while they are talking on the phone, her sister is killed by the September 11 attacks. Anupama is devastated. A few years later, Anu is happily engaged to Arpit Oberoi, then Arpit leaves for America for business reasons, and Anu is wooed by a man named Aman. Anupama accidentally meets Aman, who tells her he is a secret agent appointed on a special mission to kill terrorists. Gradually, Anupama gets attracted to Aman's hardworking and caring character. When Arpit comes back from America, Anu tells him that she is in love with Aman and she can't marry Arpit. Then Arpit starts asking questions: Who is Aman? Where does he live? She can answer these questions, but there's no evidence to support her answers, which leads Arpit to ask, "Does he even exist?" The truth is, Aman doesn't exist. He is just a figment of Anupama's imagination. Her friends and family try to explain to her that Aman doesn't exist. Anupama refuses to listen. Anupama is shown to a psychiatrist, who tells Anupama her mind is affected by her sister's death she heard on the phone and is in schizophrenia. Anupama's close friend tells her parents that she saw a boy similar to Aman. Then, suddenly, Aman comes, and everyone can see him. On Anupama's and Aman's wedding day, Aman confesses that he is really Arpit and that he got plastic surgery. The only way that his face looks exactly like Aman's is that Arpit got the drawings from Anupama's sketchbook. Anupama hears this confession, for which Arpit now tells her there is no other way than this for him to get her married for their two families' friendly relationship. Anupama's best friend asks her to show proof. Anupama shows pictures of her and Aman at the movies when Arpit is still in America without even taking a second glance at the pictures. Her friend shows the pictures to her, and she sees that Aman wasn't there. After six months, at a conference for psychiatrists, doctors declare Anupama as the 1st patient cured of schizophrenia. She tells the audience that it is all because of Arpit, who has gone back to his original face. They walk out of the conference hall, but Anupama sees Aman. They enter their car, and Anupama tells the driver to drive. Aman is seen running with the car and eventually left behind. Anupama turns around to look at Aman one last time, only to see him turn to dust. She puts her head on Arpit's shoulders and credits roll.

== Cast ==
- Bipasha Basu as Anupama "Anu" Kaul
- John Abraham as Aman Joshi / Arpit Oberoi (after plastic surgery)
- Priyanshu Chatterjee as Arpit Oberoi
- Shweta Tiwari as Tabbasum
- Rajeev Verma as Rajeev Kaul, Anupama's father
- Smita Jaykar as Sumitra Rajeev Kaul, Anupama's mother
- Anang Desai as Vishal Oberoi, Arpit's father
- Nandita Puri as Mrs. Oberoi, Arpit's mother
- Vikram Gokhale as Dr. Pradhan
- Palak Tiwari as Anupama's friend
- Juhi Babbar as Vaishali, Anupama's older sister
- Adi Irani as Anupama’s brother-in-law
- Dolly Bindra
- Murali Sharma
- Naina Dhaliwal
- Greg Roman as Kirus
- Dinesh Kaushik as Nakul

== Soundtrack ==
Madhoshi

Soundtrack album by Roop Kumar Rathod
- Released: 22 July 2004
- Genre: Feature film soundtrack
- Label: T-Series

The soundtrack is composed by Roop Kumar Rathod and lyrics were provided by Shakeel Azmi. It consists of 4 songs crooned by singers such as Udit Narayan, Alka Yagnik, Sadhana Sargam, Sukhwinder Singh, Sunidhi Chauhan, Sonu Nigam and Roop Kumar Rathod.

Track No	Song	Singer(s)
1	O Jaane Jaana	Udit Narayan and Sadhana Sargam
2	Pyar Ka Khumar	Alka Yagnik
3	Yeh Ishq Hai Gunah	Sunidhi Chauhan and Sukhwinder Singh
4	Madhoshi	Roop Kumar Rathod
5	Chale Bhi Aao	Sonu Nigam

== Critical response ==
Taran Adarsh of Bollywood Hungama gave the film 1.5 stars out of 5, writing, "On the whole, MADHOSHI could've found all-round appreciation had the makers chosen a better climax. At the box-office, the film won't find many takers, partly due to its inappropriate ending and partly due to its clash with a number of films in the same week." Anupama Chopra writing for India Today gave a negative review stating, "Each plot twist contends for Bollywood's worst ever - Chatterjee does a face/off with incredible ease and then reverts to his original face once Basu is cured; a thoughtful psychiatrist listens to two minutes of the patient's history and solemnly declares: she is suffering from schizophrenia. Basu, statuesque in bustiers and ethnic skirts, quivers in her best imitation of Hindi movie madness. It's death by cinema."

Rujuta Paradkar of Rediff.com gave the film 3 out of 5, writing, "Madhoshi takes recourse in the tried and the tested Bollywood formula of imitating several Hollywood scripts in a desperate attempt to create something 'different.' " and gave the film three stars stating "Yet, I would, very generously, give Madhoshi three stars -- after all, anything is possible in Bollywood!."

== See also ==
- List of cultural references to the September 11 attacks
