= Dhaliwal Dona =

- Village
- Location in Punjab, India Dhaliwal Dona (India)
- Coordinates: 31.357847°N 75.414807°E
- Country: India
- State: Punjab
- District: Kapurthala

Government
  - Type: Panchayati raj (India)
  - Body: Gram panchayat

Population (2011)
  - Total: 1,504
- Sex ratio 782/722♂/♀

Languages
  - Official: Punjabi
  - Other spoken: Hindi
- Time zone: UTC+5:30 (IST)
- PIN: 144601
- Telephone code: 01822
- ISO 3166 code: IN-PB
- Vehicle registration: PB-09
- Website: kapurthala.gov.in

Dhaliwal Dona is a village in Kapurthala district of Punjab State, India. It is located 5 kilometres (3.1 mi) from Kapurthala, which is both its district and sub-district headquarters. The village is administrated by a Sarpanch. who is an elected representative of village.

== Demography ==
According to the 2011 Census of India, Dhaliwal Dona has a total number of 313 houses and population of 1,504 of which include 782 males and 722 females. Literacy rate of Dhaliwal Dona is 73.56%, lower than state average of 75.84%. The population of children under the age of 6 years is 169 which is 11.24% of total population of Dhaliwal Dona, and child sex ratio is approximately 837, lower than state average of 846.

66 per cent of the population were designated as Schedule Castes.

== Air travel ==
The closest airport to the village is Sri Guru Ram Dass Jee International Airport.
