= Sukhdarshan Dhaliwal =

Punjabi poet

Sukhdarshan Dhaliwal (1950–2015) was a Punjabi-American poet, who has published three collections of poetry in Punjabi and one collection of ghazals in English.

== Biography ==
Sukhdarshan Dhaliwal was originally from the village of Lohara, Punjab. He later lived in Shawnee, Kansas. He was a contemporary author of ghazal poetry in English, Punjabi, and Urdu. He started writing Punjabi poetry in the mid-1980s. In 1986, he published “Hanjua’n Di Aawaaz”, a collection of poems about 1984 and Sikhism. In 1990, he published another book of Punjabi poems, “Sat Rangey Lafaz”. In addition to his books, several of his ghazals in Punjabi were issued on CD in a collection titled Roo-B-Roo (Face to Face) sung by Jagjit Singh Zirvi. In December, 2005 he started writing ghazals in the English language. Sukhdarshan was influenced by Urdu/Hindi ghazals, and Sufi Punjabi Music. In 2008, he published “Sach de Sanmukh”, a collection of Punjabi poems. In 2009, he published a collection of ghazals written in English, "Ghazals At Twilight".

In 2005, he also started a Punjabi Cultural Society in the Kansas City Area to celebrate the poetry, song, and dance traditions of his homeland in the United States. He continued to work in the Kansas City Punjabi community to promote Punjabi cultural events.

Sukhdarshan Dhaliwal died on January 26, 2015, at the age of 65.

== Bibliography ==
- Hanjua'n di Aawaaz (Punjabi Poems)(Sikh Serving America Publishing, 1987)
- Sat Rangey Lafaz (Punjabi Poems) (Navjug Publishing, Delhi, 1990)
- Sach De Sunmukh (Punjabi Poems) (Ravi Sahit Parkashan Publishing, Amritsar, India, 2007 ISBN 978-81-7143-445-9)
- Ghazals At Twilight (English) SD Publications, 2009 ISBN 978-0-615-29501-5
