= Pahar Singh =

Raja of the princely state of Faridkot

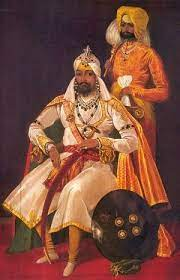
Painting of Pahar Singh (seated) with a fly-whisk (chaur sahib) attendant

Pahar Singh (1799 – April 1849) was the Raja of the Princely state of Faridkot, ruling from 1827 to 1849. (Note: His personal name is alternatively spelt as 'Padad' or 'Pahada'.)

== Biography ==
Pahar Singh succeeded to the gaddi (throne) of Faridkot after the passing of Attar Singh. His reign lasted 22 years and was marked by peace and prosperity. He found many villages and dug wells in Faridkot. Pahar Singh had four wives, including Chand Kaur.

Pahar Singh is noted for paying particular attention to the common-folk of his dominion, ensuring their welfare. Pahar Singh kept advisors around him to look-after the needs of the civilians in the state and to provide him valuable advice. Some of the useful advisors that Pahar Singh employed were sardars Meenha Singh, Ghamand Singh, and Koma Singh. Furthermore, Pahar Singh awarded his brothers, Sahib Singh and Mehtab Singh, a jagir grant consisting of villages for them to rule-over. Under Pahar Singh, the jungles that surrounded Faridkot were deforested to clear the land for development. A canal branch linking to the Sutlej was constructed, which provided valuable irrigation to the state. However, this initially built canal eventually dried-up and there was an inadequate amount of funds in the state's treasury for the construction of a new one. Therefore, Pahar Singh assisted the local zamindars (landlords) with the construction of a well instead.

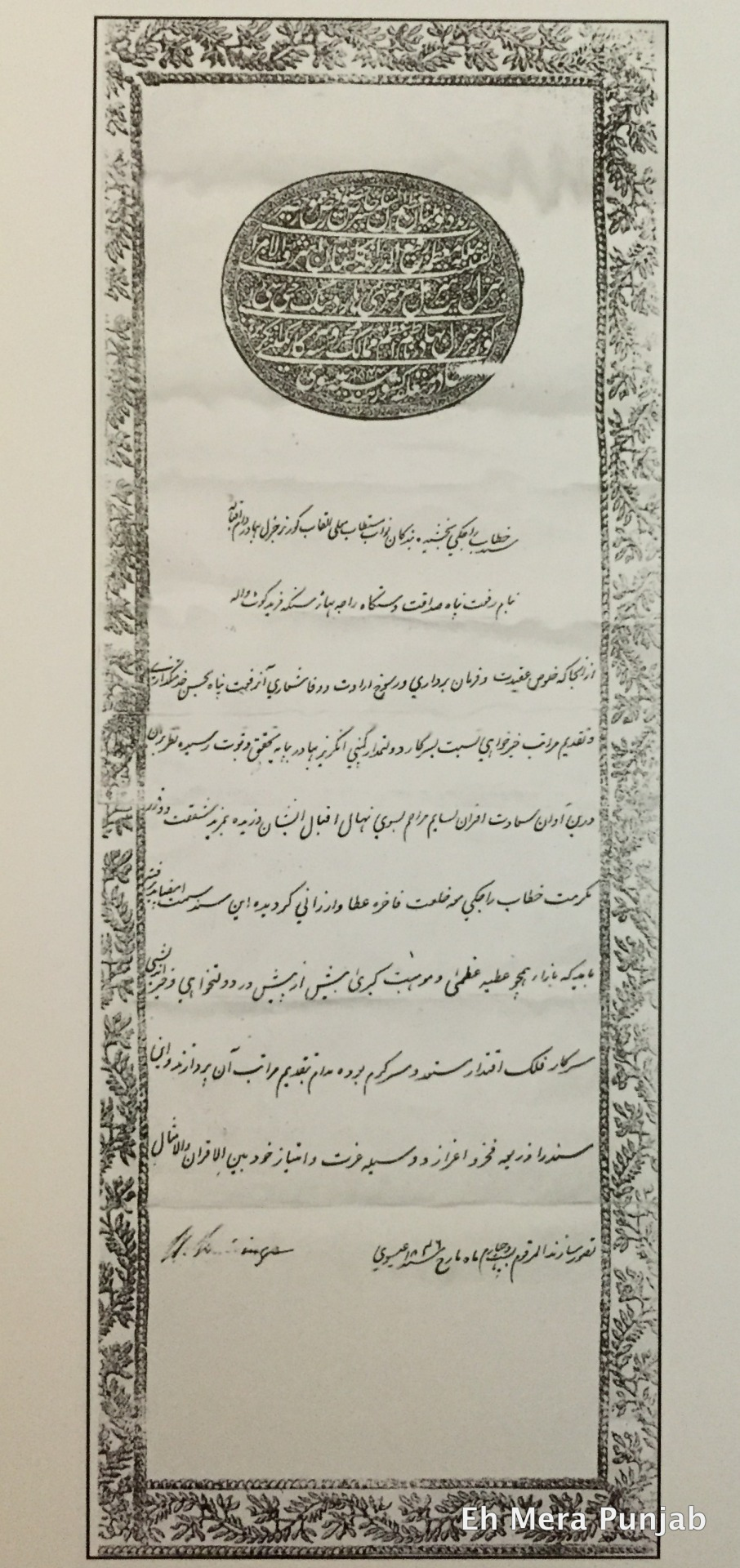
Sanad document of investiture of Raja Pahar Singh of Faridkot State from the British East India Company, ca.1837–1849

The relations between Faridkot State and Lahore State were cold. Diwan Mohkam Chand of the Lahore Darbar and the diwan of Lahore, coveted the state and wished to absorb it. Pahar Singh developed friendly ties with the British in-light of this. Pahar Singh helped the military forces of the British East India Company in the First Anglo-Sikh War in 1845–46 against the Sikh Empire. During the Battle of Ferozeshah, intel provided by Pahar Singh helped the British forces against the Lahore State. During the First Anglo-Sikh War in 1845 the chief, Raja Pahar Singh, was allied with the British, and was rewarded with an increase of territory. Pahar Singh had provided the British valuable assistance during the Battle of Mudki. During the Battle of Ferozeshah, the British were accepting their defeat and stepped-back, but the Sikh forces under Lal Singh and Tej Singh had also done the same, leaving valuable weaponry behind such as cannons and other resources at the battleground. After witnessing this, Pahar Singh reported to the British general Bradford about the situation. Due to the request of Pahar Singh, they were able to take possession of the cannons and other items left behind at the abandoned battlefield. Pahar Singh was bestowed with the raja title by the British in 1846 as a reward for the helped he provided them. Due to this, he was awarded the title of Raja and granted half of the land which was seized from the Raja of Nabha by the British Government.

Pahar Singh married Chand Kaur, who was the daughter of Samand Singh of Deena Wale. Chand Kaur gave birth to a son, Wazir Son. Pahar Singh would marry another woman who was from a Muddki royal lineage. His second-wife would give birth to princes Deep Singh and Anokh Singh. Pahar Singh died at the age of 50. Both Deep Singh and Anokh Singh had died in childhood, leaving Wazir Singh behind as the rightful heir to the Faridkot throne.

He died in April 1849 and was succeeded by his only surviving son, Wazir Singh.
