= Dhaliwal (surname) =

- Jat Sikh clan
- Location: Punjab, India
- Language: Punjabi
- Religion: Sikhism

Dhaliwal, also known as Dhariwal, is a surname and clan found among the Jat Sikhs of Punjab, India. Historically, they were influential Sardars (Sikh chiefs) under the Singh Krora Misl during the Sikh Confederacy in India.

== List of people with surname ==
Notable people with this surname, not necessarily connected to the clan, include:

- Daljit Dhaliwal (born 1962), British television presenter
- Harj Dhaliwal, Canadian politician
- Herb Dhaliwal (born 1952), Canadian politician
- Jagmeet Singh Jimmy Dhaliwal (born 1979), Canadian politician
- Jagwinder Dhaliwal (born 1981), British singer
- Mandeep Dhaliwal, Canadian politician
- Naina Dhaliwal (born 1984), Indian model
- Nirpal Singh Dhaliwal (born 1974), British journalist and novelist
- Ranj Dhaliwal (born 1976), Canadian author
- Sarindar Dhaliwal (born 1953), Canadian artist
- Sohraab Dhaliwal (born 1991), Indian cricketer
- Sukh Dhaliwal (born 1960), Canadian businessman and politician
- Sukhdarshan Dhaliwal (born 1950), Punjabi–American poet
- Vicky Dhaliwal (born 1988), Indian Punjabi-language lyricist

== See also ==
- Dhaliwal (disambiguation)
- Dharan (clan)
