= Mand Dhaliwal =

- Village
- Location in Punjab, India Mand Dhaliwal (India)
- Coordinates: 31.474857°N 75.297485°E
- Country: India
- State: Punjab
- District: Kapurthala

Government
  - Type: Panchayati raj (India)
  - Body: Gram panchayat

Population (2011)
  - Total: 6
- Sex ratio 4/2♂/♀

Languages
  - Official: Punjabi
  - Other spoken: Hindi
- Time zone: UTC+5:30 (IST)
- PIN: 144804
- Telephone code: 01822
- ISO 3166 code: IN-PB
- Vehicle registration: PB-09
- Website: kapurthala.gov.in

Mand Dhaliwal is a village in Kapurthala district of Punjab State, India. It is located 21 kilometres (13 mi) from Kapurthala, which is both district and sub-district headquarters of Mand Dhaliwal.

== Demography ==
According to the report published by Census India in 2011, Mand Dhaliwal has 1 house with the total population of 6 persons of which 4 are male and 2 females. Literacy rate of Mand Dhaliwal is 83.33%, higher than the state average of 75.84%. The population of children in the age group 0–6 years is 0 which is 0.00% of the total population. Child sex ratio is 0, lower than the state average of 846.

== Population data ==
| Particulars | Total | Male | Female |
|---|---|---|---|
| Total No. of Houses | 1 | - | - |
| Population | 6 | 4 | 2 |
| Child (0-6) | 0 | 0 | 0 |
| Schedule Caste | 0 | 0 | 0 |
| Schedule Tribe | 0 | 0 | 0 |
| Literacy | 83.33 % | 100.00 % | 50.00 % |
| Total Workers | 2 | 2 | 0 |
| Main Worker | 2 | 0 | 0 |
| Marginal Worker | 0 | 0 | 0 |
