= Dhaliwal Bet =

- Village
- Location in Punjab, India Dhaliwal Bet (India)
- Coordinates: 31.472438°N 75.318624°E
- Country: India
- State: Punjab
- District: Kapurthala

Government
  - Type: Panchayati raj (India)
  - Body: Gram panchayat

Population (2011)
  - Total: 3,370
- Sex ratio 1732/1638♂/♀

Languages
  - Official: Punjabi
  - Other spoken: Punjabi
- Time zone: UTC+5:30 (IST)
- PIN: 148004
- Telephone code: 01822
- ISO 3166 code: IN-PB
- Vehicle registration: PB-09
- Website: kapurthala.gov.in

Dhaliwal Bet is a village in Kapurthala district of Punjab State, India. It is located 21 kilometres (13 mi) from Kapurthala, which is both district and sub-district headquarters of Dhaliwal Bet. The village is administrated by a Sarpanch who is an elected representative of village as per the constitution of India and Panchayati raj (India). Dhaliwal Bet is among the villages named after the Dhaliwal gotra/community in Punjab. Historical accounts suggest that its founders were part of the Dhaliwal lineage, with origins traced to the Gupta era and migrations through Rajasthan to Punjab.

== Demography ==
According to the report published by Census India in 2011, Dhaliwal Bet has a total number of 747 houses and population of 3,370 of which include 1,732 males and 1,638 females. Literacy rate of Dhaliwal Bet is 73.54%, lower than state average of 75.84%. The population of children under the age of 6 years is 312 which is 9.26% of total population of Dhaliwal Bet, and child sex ratio is approximately 835, lower than state average of 846.

== Caste ==
The village has schedule caste (SC) constitutes 35.07% of total population of the village and it doesn't have any Schedule Tribe (ST) population,

== Population data ==
Particulars	Total	Male	Female
Total No. of Houses	747	-	-
Population	3,370	1,732	1,638
Child (0-6)	312	170	142
Schedule Caste	1,182	628	554
Schedule Tribe	0	0	0
Literacy	73.54 %	75.86 %	71.12 %
Total Workers	1,246	967	279
Main Worker	1,024	0	0
Marginal Worker	222	87	135

== Air travel connectivity ==
The closest airport to the village is Sri Guru Ram Dass Jee International Airport.
