= Qila Mubarak, Faridkot =

Fort in Faridkot, India

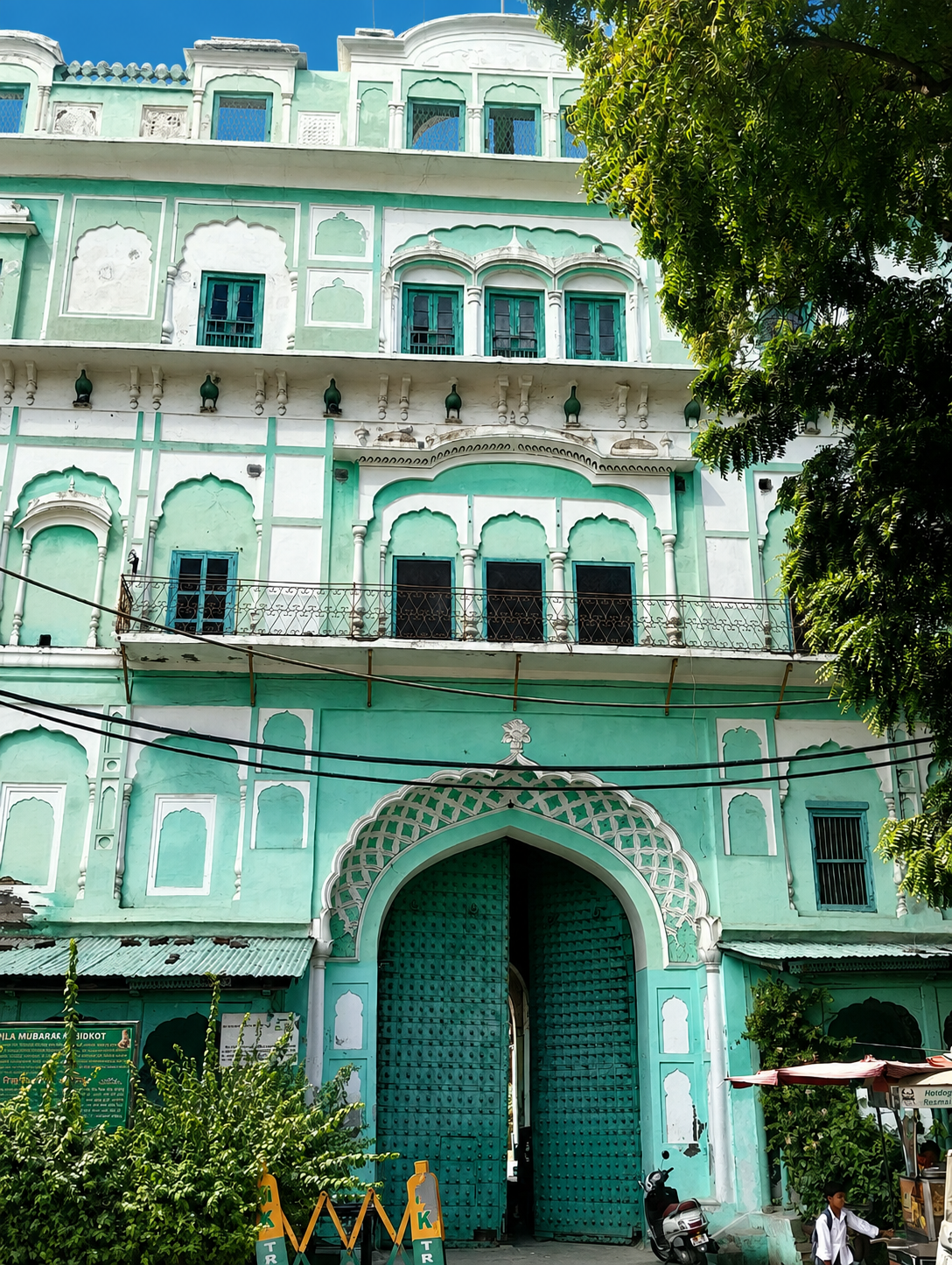
Qila Mubarak, Faridkot

Qila Mubarak, or Faridkot Fort, is a historic qila fortress located in Faridkot, Punjab, India that is spread over ten acres. It was associated with the princely-state of Faridkot. It is one of the few forts in familial possession that still survives in the region. The fortress was closed to public access for decades while its ownership was legally disputed. It is in poor condition.

== History ==
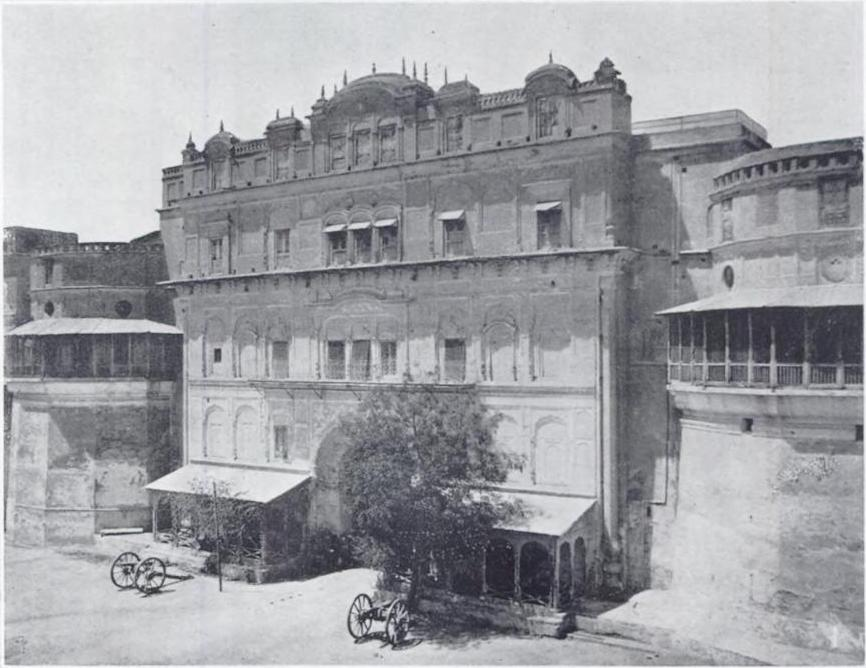
Photograph of the fortress' gate, published in 'Indian States: A Biographical, Historical, and Administrative Survey' by J. W. Bond and Arnold Wright (first published in London, 1922)

According to the district government, the fortress was originally constructed by Raja Mokalsi and renovated and extended by the successive rulers Raka Hamir Singh, Raja Bikram Singh, and Raja Balbir Singh. (Note: The name of Raja Mokalsi is alternatively rendered as 'Moalsi' or 'Mokulsi'.) The fortress was initially associated with the Kapura dynasty and later with the Brar dynasty. As per Raj Kumar Aggarwal, Mokalsi founded the settlement of Mokulhar in around 1200, which was renamed 'Faridkot' after a visit by Baba Farid. The early history of the fortress is unknown, however the settlement of Faridkot is tied to Baba Farid in 1215 as per local lore. According to the Gazetter of Faridkot State (Lahore, 1914), Mokalsi had constructed a fortress on square-shaped land. The Kapura dynasty traced their origin in the region to the 13th century and the fortress may have been raised between the 14th and 16th centuries. Raja Hamir Singh is credited with his renovations of the complex in 1775 that reconstructed the fortress. According to Balbir Singh, chairman of the Maharawal Khewaji Trust, residential colonies used to exist within the fort's boundary. In 1890, Raja Bikram Singh and Raja Balbir Singh built the present main structure of the fortress and other structures within it. The murals found in the Chitrashala room of the Shish Mahal of the complex were painted by Pahari artists in ca.1875–1900.

Raja Harinder Singh, last ruler of Faridkot, wished to house a museum in the fort's Shish Mahal but it never came to be. After the death of Raja Harinder Singh, last ruler of Faridkot State, the fort started being managed by the Maharawal Khewaji Trust. The district administration came to occupy the fortress but never paid rent. There was around a 30-year-old legal court case by the heirs of Raja Harinder Singh of Faridkot and the Maharawal Khewaji Trust over possession of the fortress, during which the fort was inaccessible to the public while its owner was being determined by the courts. The ownership of the fort was legally challenged in 1992 by the heir and in 2022, it was ruled that the two former princesses of Faridkot State, Amrit Kaur and Deepinder Kaur, were the true owners, with the claimed will of the late raja being declared a forgery.

== Architecture ==
The structure was constructed using Nanakshahi bricks and lime-mortar. Its openings are arched while the ramparts are 20-feet high and protected by burj (bastion) watchtowers. All of the constituent buildings of the complex are enclosed by high-bastioned walls. The gateway to enter the fort is located on its eastern-side. The fort features an entrance with multiple levels, consisting of a large, wooden gate, is crowned by the Sheesh Mahal sprawled across an entire floor. The entrance is a multi-level deori. Its Durbar Hall has cooling properties during hot weather and contains an elaborate plaster-of-Paris-and-woodwork ceiling. The Shish Mahal can be accessed via a stairway from the wall to the west of the gateway and consists of a three-aisled hall with smaller rooms. Its walls are decorated with glass-mirror work, consisting of geometric and botanical designs. One of the rooms of the Shish Mahal is the Chitrashala ("picture gallery"), where murals can be found, depicting religious, mythological, natural, and secular scenes. Many frescoes depicting Krishna can be found due to the Faridkot rulers tracing their ancestry to him. There are also European-influences to its architecture.

== Sections ==
The fort complex consists of various buildings, including havelis and palaces. The fort consists of:

- Durbar Hall
- Royal Palace
- Tosha Khana
- Modi Khana - military barracks located north of the entrance
- Treasury
- Moti Mahal - was later used to house the Maharwal Khewaji Trust.
- Mahal Mubarak
- Shish/Sheesh Mahal - located over an entire floor of the complex on an upper-story of the gateway, containing concave and convex glasswork, mirror-work, and wall-paintings in Rajasthani-style. Was used as a prayer-room by the former ruling dynasty. Built and painted during the 19th century.
- Garden
- Vintage car collection
- A gurdwara - north of the entrance
- Two baradaris

== Status ==
The fortress is in a poor and decaying condition. The front-street of the fortress is being developed into a heritage-street, near the gurdwara dedicated to Baba Farid. Old artefacts are preserved within the fortress. The Maharawal Khewaji Trust had planned to convert the fort into a museum that would display photographs, weapons, books, vintage cars, military vehicles, and state coaches. The trust had gotten the Shish Mahal of the complex restored. The Durbar Hall was said to have been restored by a Delhi-based company in the 2000s. Except for the burj towers, Shish Mahal, and the Moti Mahal, the rest of the fortress requires urgent restoration, including its main building. The wooden chhajjas built around the main building on the first floor are dangerous due to their poor-condition. The fort has not been afforded any special status by the Archeological Survey of India.

== Gallery ==
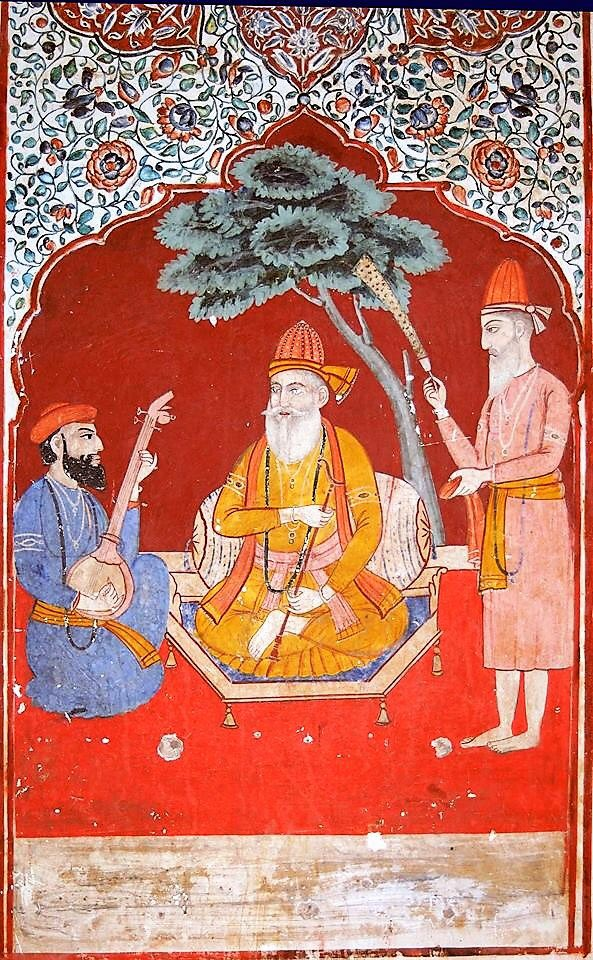
Guru Nanak, Bhai Mardana, and Bhai Bala under a tree with a red backdrop, painting from the Shish Mahal

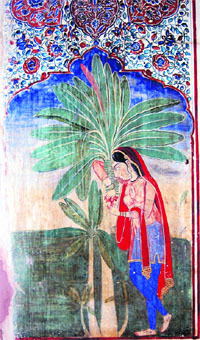
Mural of Virahini Nayika standing with her arm around a plantain tree, adorning the chitrashila of the Sheesh Mahal of Faridkot State
