= Naina Dhaliwal =

Indian actress (born 1984)

- Born: 16 September 1984 (age 42); Ludhiana, Punjab, India
- Modeling information
- Hair color: Black
- Eye color: Brown

Naina Dhaliwal (born 16 September 1984) is an Indian model and actress who has appeared in Bollywood films. Dhaliwal won the Gladrags Mrs. India contest in 2004 and represented India at the Miss Globe 2005 contest in Palm Springs, California.

Born and brought up in Ludhiana, Punjab, Dhaliwal completed her basic education from Christian Convent School, Kapurthala and graduated with a degree in humanities from Ramgarhia College.

== Filmography ==
- Madhoshi (2004)
- Anthony Kaun Hai? (2006)
- www.Love.com (2010)
- Cabaret (2011)
- Amavas (2011)
- Dand — The Punishment (2011)
- Jackpot — The Money Game(2012)
