= SRS =

SRS or SrS may stand for:

== Organizations and companies ==
=== Companies ===
- Sperry Rail Service, a rail inspection contractor
- Stanford Research Systems, a test and measurement instruments manufacturer
- SRS Cinemas, an Indian cinema chain
- SRS Labs, an American audio technology engineering company

=== Academic organizations ===
- Sea Ranger Service, a social enterprise managing ocean areas
- Sea Research Society, for diving and underwater archaeology
- Scoliosis Research Society
- Sleep Research Society, a US-based academic society
- Society for Renaissance Studies, a UK-based academic society
- Surveillance and Response Support, a unit of the European Centre for Disease Prevention and Control
- Suffolk Records Society, in the UK

=== Political parties ===
- Serbian Radical Party (Srpska radikalna stranka), a political party in Serbia
- Special Repair Service, a British construction organization in World War II

=== Other ===
- Savez Radio-Amatera Srbije, a Serbian amateur radio organization
- Socialist Revolutionary Party, or "Essers", from the late Imperial and early Soviet periods
- Southwick Regional School, a public high school in Massachusetts, United States
- Spanish Riding School, an Austrian equestrian institution
- Sri Ram Sena, an Indian Hindutva militant organization

== Mathematics, science, and technology ==
=== Science ===
- Shock response spectrum, a graphical representation of vibrations
- Spontaneous Raman spectroscopy
- Stimulated Raman spectroscopy, the inelastic scattering of photons
- String rewriting system, in computer science and mathematical logic
- Strontium sulfide (SrS), an inorganic compound
- Synchrotron Radiation Source, an X-ray facility in Cheshire, England

=== Medicine ===
- Sex reassignment surgery, also called gender-affirming surgery
- Silver–Russell syndrome, a growth disorder
- Slipping rib syndrome, a painful condition affecting the ribs
- Slow-reacting substance of anaphylaxis, a type of secretion
- Social Responsiveness Scale, a measure of autistic traits
- Somatostatin receptor scintigraphy, used to find carcinoid and other types of tumors
- Snyder–Robinson syndrome, a genetic disorder
- Spontaneous reporting system, a reporting system for drug adverse reactions
- Stereotactic radiosurgery

=== Mathematics ===
- Simple random sample, a method of sampling in statistics
  - Stratified random sample, a related method of sampling

=== Software ===
- Sender Rewriting Scheme, an email mechanism
- Sequence Retrieval System, bioinformatic software by LION Bioscience AG
- Software requirements specification, a document of a software system to be developed
- Street Racing Syndicate, a video game
- Spaced repetition software, a learning tool

=== Technology ===
- Cirrus SRS, a light-sport aircraft
- Sound Retrieval System, an audio processing technology
- Space research service, a radiocommunication service using spacecraft or other objects in space
- Spatial reference system, used to locate geographical entities by coordinate
- Supplemental restraint system, a type of automobile airbag

== Other uses ==
- Sample Registration System, Indian demographic survey
- Savannah River Site, a US Department of Energy nuclear facility
- Selhurst railway station, London, England, National Rail station code
- Social Reporting Standard, a method of reporting business responsibility
- Stealth Recon Scout, a sniper rifle made by Desert Tech
- Standard RPG System, a Japanese role-playing game system
- SRS (sailing), a handicapping system
- 1st Strategic Reconnaissance Squadron, in the US Air Force
- Security Response Section, a unit of South Australia Police
- Tsuutʼina language (ISO 639 alpha-3 language code)
