= Battle of Muktsar =

1705 conflict in the Mughal-Sikh Wars

- Part of Mughal-Sikh Wars
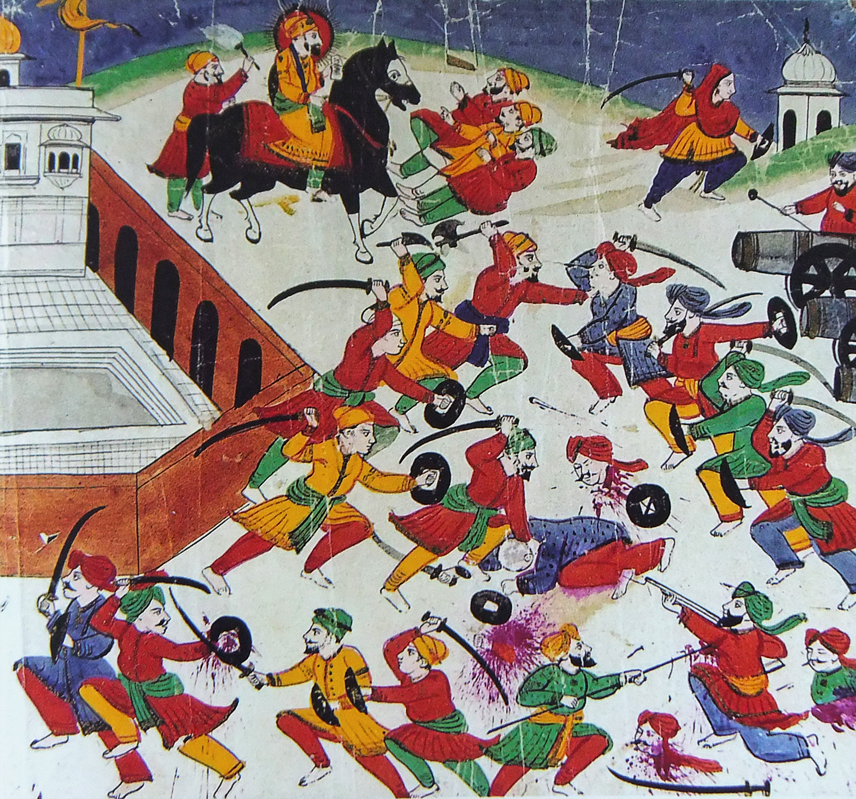
Date	29 December 1705
Location	Near the pool of Khidrānā (later Muktsar) now Sri Muktsar Sahib
Result	Sikh victory

Belligerents
Mughal Empire	Khalsa (Sikhs)

Commanders and leaders
Nawab Wazir Khan	Guru Gobind Singh; Mata Bhag Kaur (WIA); Mahan Singh †; Kapura Singh Brar

Strength
7,000– 12,000	40 mukte and Mata Bhag Kaur 1300 soldiers under Kapura Singh Brar and Daan Singh Brar

Casualties and losses
3,000 killed	40 mukhte, 260 other soldiers

The Battle of Sri Muktsar Sahib (Muktsar) or Battle of Khidrāne Dee Dhāb took place on 29 December 1705, (29 Poh) following the siege of Anandpur Sahib. In 1704, Anandpur Sahib was under an extended siege by the allied forces of the Mughals and the Hill States of Shivalik.

== History ==
During the siege 40 Sikhs, led by Maha Singh, wrote letters of bedava (abandonment of a Sikh from his Guru) to Guru Gobind Singh. They arrived in the village of Jhabal where a Sikh woman named Mata Bhag Kaur, upon hearing their tale of desertion, motivated them into returning to Guru ji at Anandpur Sahib.

The 40 deserters with Mai Bhag Kaur returned to seek out Guru Gobind Singh ji, and joined him near Khidrāne Dee Dhāb preparing for battle against the Mughals. They fought the Mughals and died in the following battle. The guru, finding the dying Maha Singh on the battlefield after the battle, forgave him and his compatriots, tore up their letters of bedava, and blessed them for their service. The place was later renamed Muktsar, literally meaning The Pool of Liberation. Mai Bhago survived the battle and stayed on with Guru Gobind Singh ji as one of his bodyguards. The Mela Maghi is held at the holy city of Sri Muktsar Sahib every year in memory of the forty Sikh martyrs.

== See also ==
- Women in Sikhism
