= Rattan Lal Mittal =

- Born: 23 April 1937; Kotkapura, Faridkot district, Punjab, India
- Died: 26 August 2026 (aged 89)
- Occupation: Orthopedic surgeon
- Awards: Padma Shri (2021)

Rattan Lal Mittal (23 April 1937-26 August 2026) was a orthopaedic surgeon. He was known for performing pro bono complex clubfoot surgeries.

Mittal was from Kotakpura, Faridkot district, Punjab, India. He was a professor and head of the Orthopaedic Department at Government Medical College, Patiala. He served as a director at Research and Medical Education department of Punjab Government.

He received Padma Shri in 2021 for his contribution in the field of medicine. A tribute was paid in Punjab Legislative Assembly on 22 October 2026.
