= Ulrike Knobloch =

German economist

Ulrike Knobloch (born 1961), is a German economist at the Berlin School of Economics and Law. Knobloch deals with gender studies or gender science topics for theoretical economics that takes in real-world problems in social systems.

Knobloch studied economics at the University of Freiburg, graduating with a diploma and taking in additional courses in philosophy. She did her Ph.D. at the University of St. Gallen in economic-ethic, connecting ethical implications with gender issues. Knobloch went on to conduct research in various universities and has also worked for banks. From 2016 to 2024, she was a professor of economics and gender at University of Vechta. Since 2025, she has been professor of economics at the Berlin School of Economics and Law and member of the Harriet Taylor Mill-Institute.

== Publications ==
- Biesecker, A., Jochimsen, M., & Knobloch, U. (1997). Vorsorgendes Wirtschaften. Ökologisches Wirtschaften, 12(3-4).
- Knobloch, U. (1994): Theorie und Ethik des Konsums. Reflexion auf die normativen Grundlagen sozialökonomischer Konsumtheorien. Bern et al.: Haupt Verlag.
