= Maharaja Ranjit Singh Armed Forces Preparatory Institute =

Armed forces preparatory institute in Punjab, India

- Maharaja Ranjit Singh Armed Forces Preparatory Institute
- Abbreviation: Maharaja Ranjit Singh AFPI
- Formation: April 2011; 15 years ago
- Purpose: Training for service into the armed forces
- Region served: Punjab, India
- Website: https://afpipunjab.org

The Maharaja Ranjit Singh Armed Forces Preparatory Institute, also known as the Maharaja Ranjit Singh AFPI or the MRSAFPI, is an institute that trains young boys from Punjab for permanent commission through the National Defence Academy into the armed forces. The institute began training in April 2011, and was established in Sector 77 Mohali by the Government of Punjab, India. The institute is designed to train 96 boys at any one time. The training period is two years. There are two batches of 48 cadets at a time trained at the institute.It is infamously known for its ragging culture.

== History ==
The institute began training in April 2011 with an intake capacity of 40 students. The institute was originally created in 2011 on the orders of Parkash Singh Badal, who was disturbed by the ever-reducing number of Punjab youth inducted into training institutions and commissioned as officers. (In the past, cadets from Punjab had made up a significant part of the academy strength, but this eventually diminished to about six or eight boys per course.) Inspired by the success of the institute, the Punjab Government created the Mai Bhago Armed Forces Preparatory Institute, named after Mai Bhago, in July 2015 to prepare girls to become commissioned officers.

In June 2017, the first six cadets of the institute, from the first batch which had trained from 2011 to 2013, were commissioned as officers from the Indian Military Academy.

In June 2019, institute alumni were recognized in the batch of officers who were then commissioned into the Indian Air Force.

In December 2019, Amarinder Singh announced that the State Government would bear the cost of educating poor students at the AFPI, who would only need to pay their own school fee.

In 2019, 25 former cadets of the institute joined the National Defence Academy (India) or the Indian Military Academy; they also received "Achiever Awards" in a ceremony on 18 December 2019. In March 2021, five cadets from the institute, who underwent training from 2018 to 2020 as part of the 8th AFPI course, were selected to join the National Defence Academy. As of then, 14 cadets of the 8th AFPI course had already joined the NDA the previous year, and 202 cadets from the AFPI had joined same service academy till Feb 2023.

== Entrance procedure ==
The admissions process begins when the institute publishes advertisements inviting applications in newspapers in November. Applications are sent online by the first week of January. Entrance tests are held in January, and candidates who do well are called for interviews in January and February; following this is a medical examination. Finally, all selected candidates are required to attend the institute in April.

The institute conducts an entrance test in January every year. It includes grade 10 Math and English as syllabus. A merit list is prepared on the performance of written test and 150 names are short listed for the interview. After the test, a 1-day interview is conducted. The basic aim of the interview is to choose the best out of the good. There is no study required for the interview. In the interview general ability and mental level of the candidate is tested. The candidates who are selected in the interview have to go for their medical conducted by the institute. Basic aim of medical is to check for internal disabilities if any. After the medical a final merit list is prepared showing the names of 48 selected cadets.

== Squadron ==
After the admission to the institute, a cadet is given his squadron and number.

== Training ==
The four major aspects of training at AFPI are:

1. Academics - all cadets study Plus 1 and Plus 2 in the non medical stream (Physics, Chemistry, Math, English and Physical Education / Computer Science). For this purpose AFPI has a contractual arrangement with Shemrocks a local school in Mohali.
2. Physical Fitness-Cadets do PT equivalent to 1st Term NDA standards (Basic Tests); 2nd Term standards (Higher tests); and 3rd Term standards (Excellence Tests). Drill is also taught at AFPI. All important games are played to include Hockey, Football, Basketball, Volleyball, Cross Country, Boxing, Lawn Tennis. Squash, Golf and Swimming. Shooting is also taught at an indoor shooting range. Equitation training is likely to be introduced shortly.
3. Personality Development and OLQ-Leadership, Soft skills, Communication skills, art of study, Know the armed forces, War movies, Debates, Group discussions, presentations, visit to military units.
4. Preparation for the NDA entrance test and SSB interviews.

== Finances ==
All training and administrative expenses are borne by the State Government of Punjab. The cadet only has to pay school fees for the school in which he is doing his academics.

== Results ==
In March 2013, the first course passed out. Seven cadets have joined NDA /NAVAC. 5th course has completed training. Till now 149 cadets have joined NDA / NAVAC and more than 248 cadets have joined different defence Academies. It produced an average of 25 cadets each year.

== Governance and faculty ==
The Chief Minister of Punjab is the chairman of the institute's governing body. The director of the institute is major general Baljit Singh Grewal, and the Psychologist of the institute is Gp Capt Arun Kumar Srivastva. The institute's administrative staff are:

- Warden: Nb Sub Balwinder Singh
- Accountant: Sub Maj Balkar Singh
- Head clerk: Hav Dharmpal Singh
- Library clerk: Mr. Amandeep Singh
- Drill Instructor: Sub Swaran Singh
- PTI: Hony Capt Rajinder Singh
- PTI: Hav Gurmail Singh
- Driver: Hav Kuldip Singh
- Driver: Hav Parmjeet Singh

== See also ==
- National Defence Academy (India)
- Ranjit Singh
