= Motle Wala =

Village in Punjab, India

Motle Wala ਮੋਤਲੇ ਵਾਲਾ
- Village
- Location in Punjab, India Motle Wala (India)
- Coordinates: 30.570640°N 74.672055°E
- Country: India
- States: Punjab
- District: Sri Muktsar Sahib

Government
  - Type: Gram Panchayat
  - Body: Sarpanch

Languages
  - official: Punjabi (Gurmukhi)
- Time zone: UTC+5:30 (IST)
- PIN: 152025
- Nearest city: Sri Muktsar Sahib

Motle Wala is a village in Sri Muktsar Sahib District of Punjab, India. The village has population of 1157 as per the population census of 2011.
