= Sri Muktsar Sahib =

Sri Muktsar Sahib Srī Muktsar Sāhib (Punjabi) Muktsar
- City
- Sri Muktsar Sahib
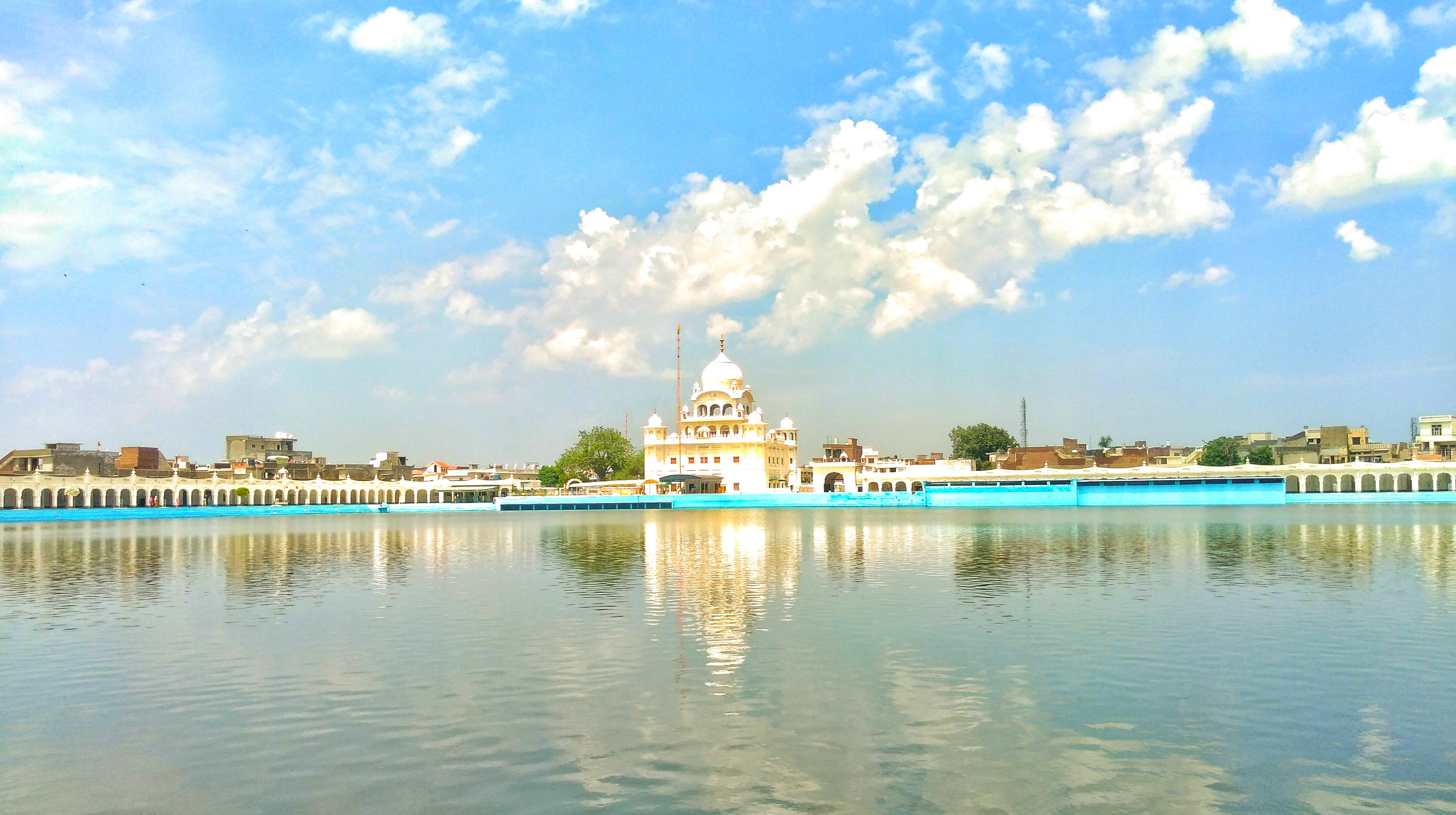
- Gurdwara Tutti Gandi Sahib, Sri Muktsar Sahib
- Nickname: Muktsar
- Location of Sri Muktsar Sahib in Punjab Sri Muktsar Sahib (India)
- Coordinates: 30°28′31.231″N 74°30′53.636″E
- Country: India
- State: Punjab

Government
  - Body: Municipal council of Sri Muktsar Sahib

Area
  - Total: 12.66 sq mi (32.80 km^{2})
- Elevation: 648.5 ft (197.67 m)

Population (2011)
  - Total: 117,085
  - Rank: 14th largest city in Punjab
- Demonym: Muktsari
- Time zone: UTC+5:30 (Indian Standard Time)
- PIN: 152026
- Landline telephone area code: 01633
- Vehicle registration: PB-30
- Website: muktsar.nic.in

Sri Muktsar Sahib (/ʃriː ˈmʊktsər ˈsɑːhɪb/ shree MUUKT-sər SAH-hib), often referred to as simply Muktsar, is a historical city and district headquarters in Punjab, India. The 2011 census of India put the total population of Sri Muktsar Sahib municipality at 117,085, making it the 14th largest city of Punjab, in terms of population. The second Guru of the Sikhs, Guru Angad (Nanak II) was born in the village Matte-di-Sarai (Sarainaga) in the same district. Earlier the city was called Khidrana/Khidrane di dhab, the city was named Muktsar after the Battle of Muktsar in 1705 and the district headquarters in 1995. The government officially changed the name of the city to Sri Muktsar Sahib in 2012, though the city is still primarily referred to by its unofficial name – Muktsar.

== History and etymology ==
=== Early history ===
The modern day Sri Muktsar Sahib city was historically a semi-desert terrain named Khidrana or Khidrane de dhab, situated near a lake. Not much is known about the early history of the present area of the city. This may partly be due to the river Sutlej. The Sutlej is notorious for shifting its course, and it is stated to have flowed as far east as Sri Muktsar Sahib within historical times. While shifting its course it is said to have leveled down everything that came its way, leaving behind ruins and mounds of earth and pottery debris. The present area of Sri Muktsar Sahib is almost entirely destitute of ancient buildings and contains no places mentioned in early records. Legends connected with Raja Sálbán attach to one or two other ruined sites near Sri Muktsar Sahib such as that at Sarainaga, 10 miles (16 km) to the east of Sri Muktsar Sahib.

=== Medieval history ===
Rao Burar had two sons, Paur and Dhul, with the younger’s progeny having held almost the whole of the region of Sri Muktsar Sahib. Many of these Brar Jats followed the Sikh Gurus and later embraced the Sikh faith, during the times of Guru Gobind Singh. These Brar Jats under Chaudary Kapura are known to have fought against the imperial Mughal armies alongside Guru Gobind Singh and the Chali Mukhte.

=== Battle of Muktsar ===
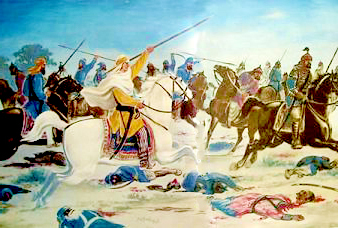
Mai Bhago & 40 Soldiers during the Battle of Muktsar (1705)

In 1705, after battle of Chamkaur against the Mughals, Guru Gobind Singh started looking out for a suitable place from where he could re-group his forces and battle the Mughal forces, who were now supported by the Dogra hill chiefs. Assisted by an experienced guide of a Brar chief, the guru reached Khidrane Di Dhab where he finally decided to meet the enemy. He received news of imperial troops, at least 10,000 strong, under Wazir Khan, subedar of Sirhind pursuing him. Earlier, in 1704, when Guru Gobind Singh's Army was treacherously surrounded in Anandpur Sahib by the Moghul forces, supported by Dogra hill chiefs, Sikhs had run out of provisions. Some historians believe that 40 Sikhs from Majha region of Jhabal had deserted the Guru. Historians believe that the Guru asked them to write a formal declaration stating they no longer wish to fight alongside Guru Gobind Singh. However, realizing their mistake of deserting him, and under the motivation of Mai Bhago, these 40 deserters came back to join the Guru's forces at Sri Muktsar Sahib. Guru Gobind Singh also sent reinforcements, though the number of Sikh soldiers is disputed. Historians like Latif have put it at 12,000, although the Sikh chroniclers say they were far fewer, some say as few as forty. They showered arrows from his strategic position on the mound, down upon the imperial army, killing a number of them. The resistance of the Sikhs became fierce. The enemy became restive for want of water. It was not possible for them to reach the lake of Khidrana. As it was semi-desert terrain and the summer heat was reaching its peak, the Guru knew of its importance and based his defenses around the water reservoir. The only water they could get was fifteen miles behind them. Thirst and oppressive heat, and the tough resistance offered by the Sikhs, compelled the Mughal army to retreat. Guru Gobind Singh won this last Mughal-Khalsa battle, which had resulted in heavy casualties. At the end of the battle, when he was looking for survivors, Mai Bhago, who was lying wounded, told him how the forty deserters had laid down their lives fighting in the battlefield. Mai Bhago recovered and remained in the Guru's presence after the battle of Sri Muktsar Sahib. When Guru Gobind Singh along with his Sikhs, was collecting the dead bodies for cremation, he found one man, named Mahan Singh, still clinging to life. On seeing the Guru, he made an effort to rise; the Guru at once took him in his embrace, and sat down with him. Mahan Singh, tearful and exhausted, requested the guru to destroy the document disclaiming his being a Sikh of the Guru. Before Mahan Singh died, Guru Gobind Singh took the document and tore it up. It is a legendary belief that this gave "mukti", meaning freedom, to those 40 Sikhs and hence, the city got its modern-day name Muktsar, where the word "sar" is derived from the word "sarovar", meaning reservoir, with reference to the Kidrana reservoir.

=== Post battle of Muktsar ===
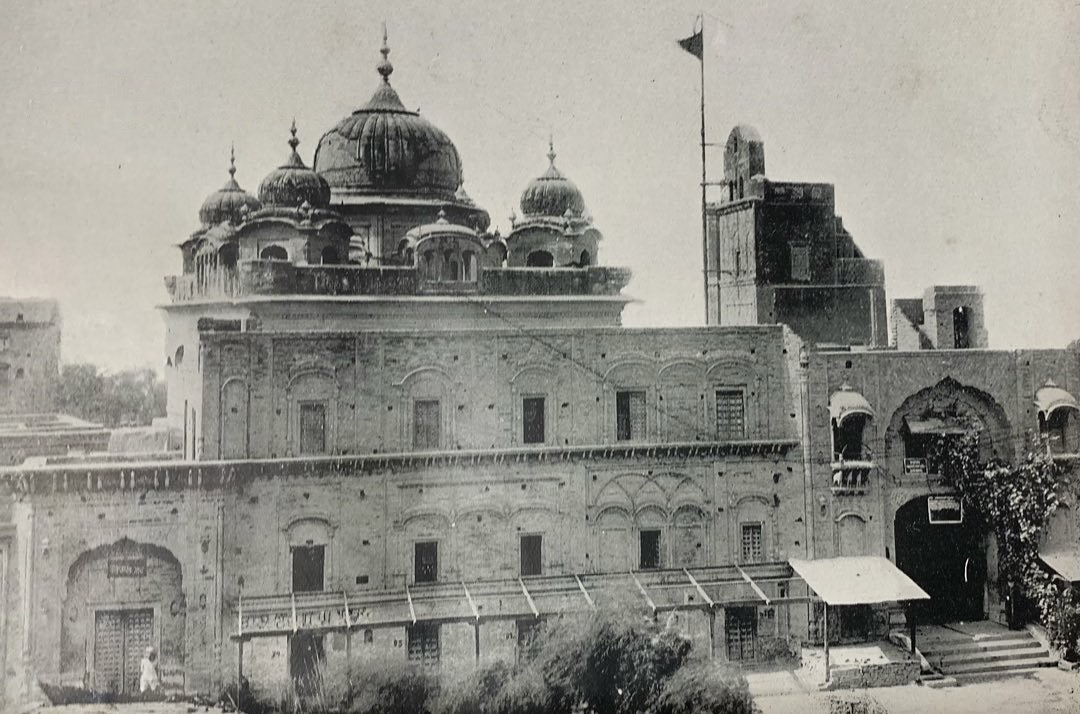
Photograph of the gurdwara at Sri Muktsar Sahib, ca.1924

In the days of the persecution of the Sikhs, Jassa Singh often took refuge in the jungles of Sri Muktsar Sahib.

The territories of Sri Muktsar Sahib, Kotkapura, Mari and Mudki together with the Faridkot State, originally formed one territory, with its capital at Kotkapura. In 1807, Dewan Mokham Chand conquered the whole of this territory from Tegh Singh, and added it to the Lahore demesne. Mohkam Chand established thanas at Sri Muktsar Sahib, Kotkapura and Mari and since that time, the villages subject to these thanas have been known as separate territories.

Ram Singh, leader of the Namdhari sect, visited Sri Muktsar Sahib in 1861 on the occasion of Mela Maghi to deliver his message. However, the priests of Sri Muktsar Sahib Gurudwara refused to pray for Ram Singh, unless he agreed, by way of penalty for his "un-Sikh" ways, to pay the entire cost of masonry for the local tank.

=== Modern history ===
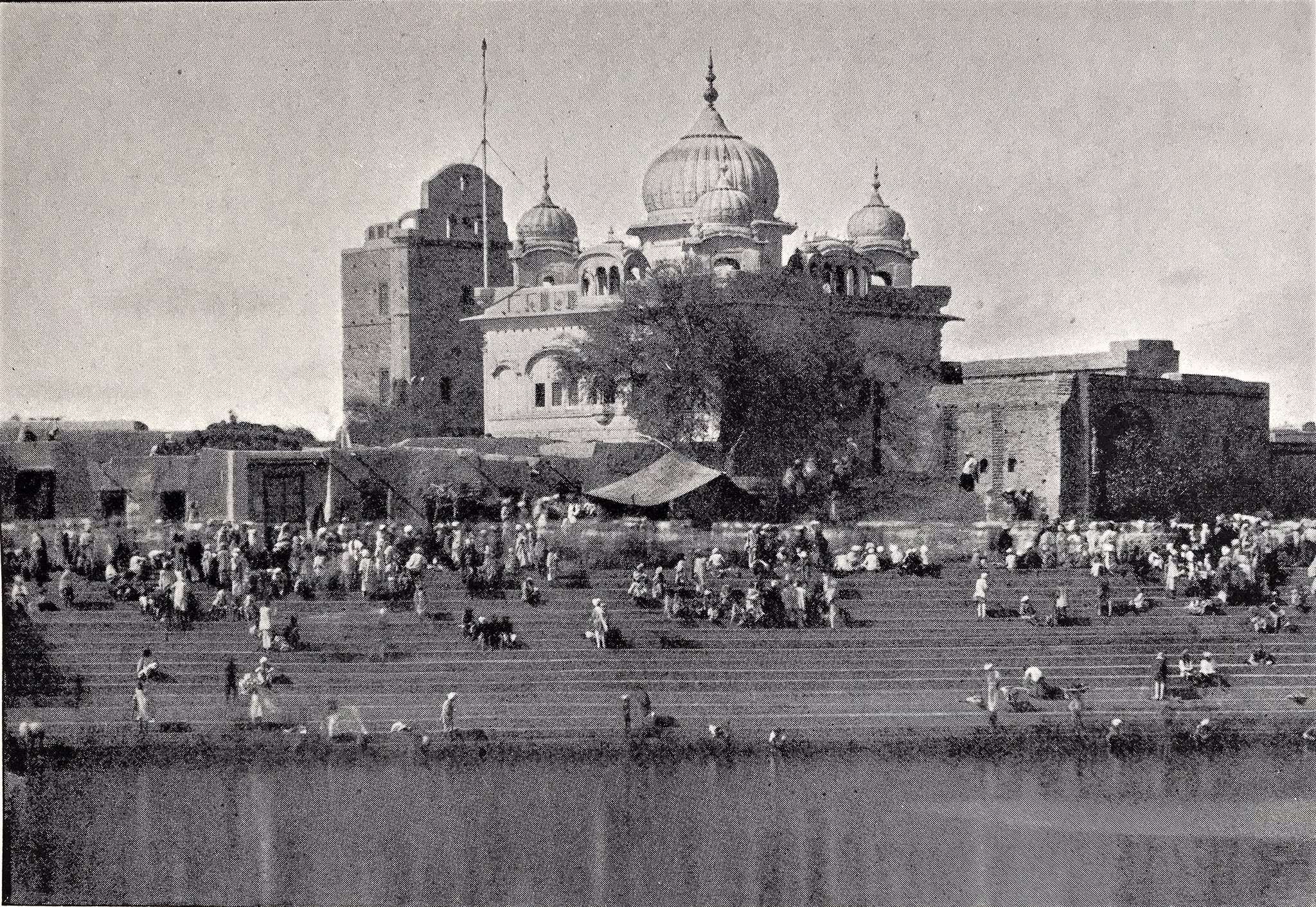
Historical photograph of Darbar Sahib, Muktsar in the 1920's.

After India gained independence from the British in August 1947, there was an aggressive exodus of the non-Muslims from West Punjab and that of Muslims from the East Punjab. A large number of refugees from the Bahawalpur state and from Montgomery and Lahore districts entered India through the border along the Firozpur district, of which Sri Muktsar Sahib was a part of. According to the 1951 Census, 349,767 refugees from Pakistan settled in the Firozpur district including the erstwhile Sri Muktsar Sahib and Moga tehsils.

The Sri Muktsar Sahib city remained a tehsil of Ferozepur district from August 1947 to August 1972, and then it became a tehsil of the newly carved out district, Faridkot. In November 1995, Sri Muktsar Sahib became a district city. In February 2012, the city was officially renamed to Sri Muktsar Sahib from Muktsar.

== Geography ==
Sri Muktsar Sahib is located in the south-western part of the Punjab state in north India. The city is spread over an area of 12.66 square miles (32.80 square Km). The geographical coordinates of the city are 30° 29' 0" North, and 74° 31' 0" East. Nearby cities include Bathinda 33 miles (53 km) to the south east, Ferozepur 32 miles (52 km) to the north, Faridkot 31 miles (50 km ) to the north east and Abohar 35 miles (56 km) to the south west. The state capital, Chandigarh, lies 249 km (155 miles) east to Sri Muktsar Sahib. The city of Ludhiana is 92 miles (148 km) and Amritsar lies 104 miles (167 km) away. The Indian capital, New Delhi, lies 247 miles (398 km) south east to Sri Muktsar Sahib.

=== Topography ===
The average land elevation of the city is 648.52 feet (197.67 metres) above sea level. Lithologically, Sri Muktsar Sahib is a part of the vast Indo-Gangetic alluvial plain, composed of alternate bands of sands, silt and clay with pebbles. Sandy plains, sand dunes and topographic depressions are the common landforms.

=== Pedology ===
The soil of Sri Muktsar Sahib varies from sandy to loam in texture, and is low in organic carbon, phosphorus, zinc and other micro nutrients, but high in potassium. The salt affected soil of Sri Muktsar Sahib has been categorized as sodic soil and saline sodic soil. The villages surrounding the city produce high yields of cotton, wheat, paddy and seed oil.

=== Climate ===
Climatically, the Western Himalaya in the north and the Thar Desert in the south and south-west mainly influence the climatic conditions. Since the city lies far away from the Sivalik Hills, and any of the major rivers, it experiences an extreme climate situation. Summers are extremely hot, and winters very cold. The city experiences four distinct seasons – spring (February – March), summer (April – August), fall/autumn (September – October) and winter (November – January), along with the monsoon season setting in towards the later half of the summer. Summers, from early April to mid October, are typically very hot and humid, with an average daily June high temperature of 104 °F (40 °C). The season experiences heat indices easily breaking 110 °F (43 °C). Winters are very cold and foggy with few sunny days, and with a December daytime average of 37.4 °F (3 °C). The Western Disturbance brings some rain in winters that further adds to the chill. Spring and autumn are mild and pleasant seasons with low humidity. The monsoon season usually starts in the first week of July and continues till August. Thunderstorms are not uncommon during the Monsoon. The mean annual rainfall fluctuates around 397.7 mm. Rainfall in 2023 being 385.7mm, around 3% lower than normal. About 75 per cent of the annual rainfall in the city is received during the monsoon season.

== Demographics ==
Languages spoken in Sri Muktsar Sahib (2011)
1. Punjabi (84.5%)
2. Hindi (14.8%)
3. Others (0.70%)

Sri Muktsar Sahib is the 14th most populated city of the Punjab. According to the 2011 census of India, Sri Muktsar Sahib urban city has a population of 117,085, of which males constitute 61,725 (52.87%) and females 55,022 (46.99%). The total number of households in the city is 23,644. The population under the age of 6 is recorded as 13,981, of which 7,646 are males and 6,335 females. The total number of literates in the city are 78,606, with 44,089 males and 34,517 females. 36,084 people work full-time in the city, of which a majority of them are males, constituting at 31,081 (86.14%) and only 5,003 (13.86%) females. The number of marginal workers is 4,213. The number of non-workers in Sri Muktsar Sahib is 76,450. The city has a Scheduled Caste population of 38,381, of which 20,118 are males and 18,263 females

=== Religion ===
Religion in Sri Muktsar Sahib City
Religion	Percent
Hinduism	55.56%
Sikhism	42.77%
Islam	1.09%
Christianity	0.34%
Other or not stated	0.24%

The predominant religions among the city's population are Sikhism and Hinduism; Sri Muktsar Sahib also has a few adherents of Buddhism, Jainism, Islam and Christianity. The Muslim population represents only 1.09% of the city's population.

The table below shows the population of different religious groups in Sri Muktsar Sahib city, as of 2011 census.

Population by religious groups in Sri Muktsar Sahib city, 2011 census
Religion	Total	Female	Male
Hindu	64,865	30,399	34,466
Sikh	49,934	23,713	26,221
Muslim	1,267	571	696
Christian	398	200	198
Jain	150	72	78
Buddhist	79	38	41
Other religions	9	6	3
Not stated	45	23	22
Total	116,747	55,022	61,725

== Culture ==
The contemporary lifestyle of the city is still strongly grounded in the traditional Punjabi culture, though the residents have customised the modernisation, retaining the elements of their original culture. People often tend to be conservative in thoughts, opinions and clothes as compared to bigger cities. Since Sri Muktsar Sahib lacks any major industry interaction or activity, it is largely not impacted by the modern cosmopolitan culture. The city has a share of troubles as small towns are low on priority list of everyone. However, the traditional Punjabi culture in Sri Muktsar Sahib is rich, emphasising family values and respect for elders. Regional as well as national festivals – Lohri, Holi, Gurpurbs and Diwali – are celebrated with great fervour. Weddings in the city are an elaborate, expensive arrangement, with the rituals extending for days, accompanied with songs, music, dance, traditional dresses and food. Traditional dance forms include bhangra and giddha. Sri Muktsar Sahib is well renowned for Muktsari kurta pajama and Muktsari jutti.

=== Languages and dialect ===
Punjabi is the main language spoken in the city, and is typically spoken with a Malwai dialect. People also understand Hindi, though it is spoken with a Punjabi accent. Rajasthani is another dialect spoken in the city because of its proximity to the State of Rajasthan. Since some migrants from other states like Uttar Pradesh and Bihar come to Sri Muktsar Sahib for manual unskilled jobs, the number of Hindi speakers has increased. A small segment of the city's population can comprehend English.

=== Cuisine ===
Wheat, in the form of rotis and parathas, forms the staple food of the city, which is eaten with cooked vegetables or legumes, usually in a spicy curry, using cooking oil. The common vegetables include potato, cauliflower, eggplant, okra and carrot. The popular legumes often cooked in the form of curry are lentil, chickpea, pigeon pea, black gram, peas and beans. Rice and dairy products are also an important component of the local food. Paneer – milk solids pressed under a weight and cut into cubes – is an expensive dairy food, eaten as curry with peas or other vegetables. The food is often supplemented by dairy products, such as yogurt or clarified butter, chutneys, pickles, papad onion, cucumbers or tomatoes. The local cuisine is well classified into two categories: vegetarian and non-vegetarian. However, meat is expensive, so most people cannot afford to eat meat or fish everyday, and even affluent people eat relatively little meat by western standards. Western style breakfast of toast, eggs, or prepared breakfast cereals is gaining popularity in the city compared to traditional Punjabi cuisine. The most popular method of cooking is using LPG gas stoves and traditionally, the household cooking is done mostly by women.

The city has many restaurants that serve the local cuisine, Chinese food, South Indian food, fast food, pizza and ice cream. Chai, samosa, golgappa, dahi bhalla, aloo tikki, pakora, chow mein and kulcha are cheap fast-selling items that are sold by both unlicensed and licensed food vendors, including mobile vendors, though the hygiene of the food is sometimes questionable. Burgers have managed to creep in as a cheap street fare, though it is very different from a typical American burger. Sri Muktsar Sahib does not have any significant presence of a major international food chain store or a fine dining restaurant.

=== Entertainment and performing arts ===
Entertainment avenues are virtually non-existent in Sri Muktsar Sahib. The city is not exposed to western culture of nightclubs, pubs or clubs. In July 2015, the first multiplex was opened in Sri Muktsar Sahib with 3 screens and 590 seats, this cinema is being run as a franchise from SRS Cinemas by Rajpal theater. There are no museums or performing arts centers in the city.

=== Parks ===
The major park in the city is Guru Gobind Singh Park, which has a sidewalk in a circular loop, that can be used for jogging. Mai Bhago park, located just behind Guru Gobind Singh Park, is a war memorial as a reminiscence for the battle of Sri Muktsar Sahib in the memory of Mai Bhago and 40 Muktas. However, the park is ill-maintained. The city has another small park in the Mukt-e-minar complex, which houses the world's tallest khanda. It is located along the District Administrative Complex.

== Economy ==
The city is virtually non-industrialized, lacking any significant industrial unit or factory. Before independence, Sri Muktsar Sahib only had a few units producing small hand-held agricultural tools. Today, the only large scale industry near the city is Satia Paper Mills Limited, which is located about 7 km from the city center in Rupana village. The city has well-defined trade unions for most of the professions. The paper & card board workers union was officially registered in Sri Muktsar Sahib in February 1986, the plumber union and also the cycle rickshaw puller union in September 1996 and mistri mazdoor (general manual labor) union in June 1998.

Sri Muktsar Sahib have SBD shopping mall and the retail industry is largely unorganized. Though major retail chains have opened stores in Sri Muktsar Sahib - Vishal Mega Mart, More, Reliance Smart and three Smart Point stores, the local population typically buys FMCG goods, groceries, fresh produce like vegetables, eggs, milk and meat from small unorganized retail vendors, including small shops and unlicensed mobile vendors, rather than from organized retail stores.

== Law and government ==
=== Local self government ===
The city is based on a municipal council form of government The Municipal Council is an institution which acts within the frame work set up by the Punjab Government and draws its powers from legislative enactment. It is managed by persons elected from among the public. In many respects, these institutions are independent but work under the oversight of the Punjab Government. The sources of income of the municipality include house tax, toll tax, water and sewerage rate, license fee, building fee, professional tax, entertainment tax, liquor tax and some minor taxes. The Sri Muktsar Sahib municipality was constituted in April 1876 by the British Raj. The civic amenities provided by the municipal council include water supply, street lights, drainage, brick pavement of streets, cleanliness of the town and disposal of refuse. The municipal council maintains 28 miles (45 km) of roads. About 75 per cent of the town has sewerage facilities. Street lights have been installed in about 90 per cent of the town. The municipal council runs a public library and a reading room. It also maintains two parks.

=== Administration ===
The city's administration is managed by a Civil Sub Divisional Officer, reporting to the deputy commissioner of the Sri Muktsar Sahib district. This position is responsible for co-ordinating the work of departments, the development activities, the revenue administration and the law and order of the city. Also, this position responds to the grievances of the public and attends to the problems arising out of natural calamities. The job profile for this position is also to act as the assistant collector under the Punjab Land Revenue Act and Punjab Tenancy Act. The profile is the appellate authority in cases decided by the subordinate revenue officers. A Sub-Divisional Magistrate placed by the State Government is the Executive Magistrate of Sri Muktsar Sahib, who reports to the District Magistrate and is responsible for the maintenance of law and order within the limits of local jurisdiction, and also hears court cases. The other administrative positions include tehsildar, naib tehsildar, kanungo and patwari.

=== Police ===
The law and order situation of Sri Muktsar Sahib is directly managed by the Deputy Superintendent of Police, also known as Assistant Commissioner of Police and is an officer of Indian Police Service cadre, who reports to the Senior Superintendent of the District Sri Muktsar Sahib Police. Sri Muktsar Sahib police, which forms a part of Punjab Police, functions from two police stations: Police Station – City and Police Station – Sadar.

== Places of interest ==
=== Gurudwaras ===
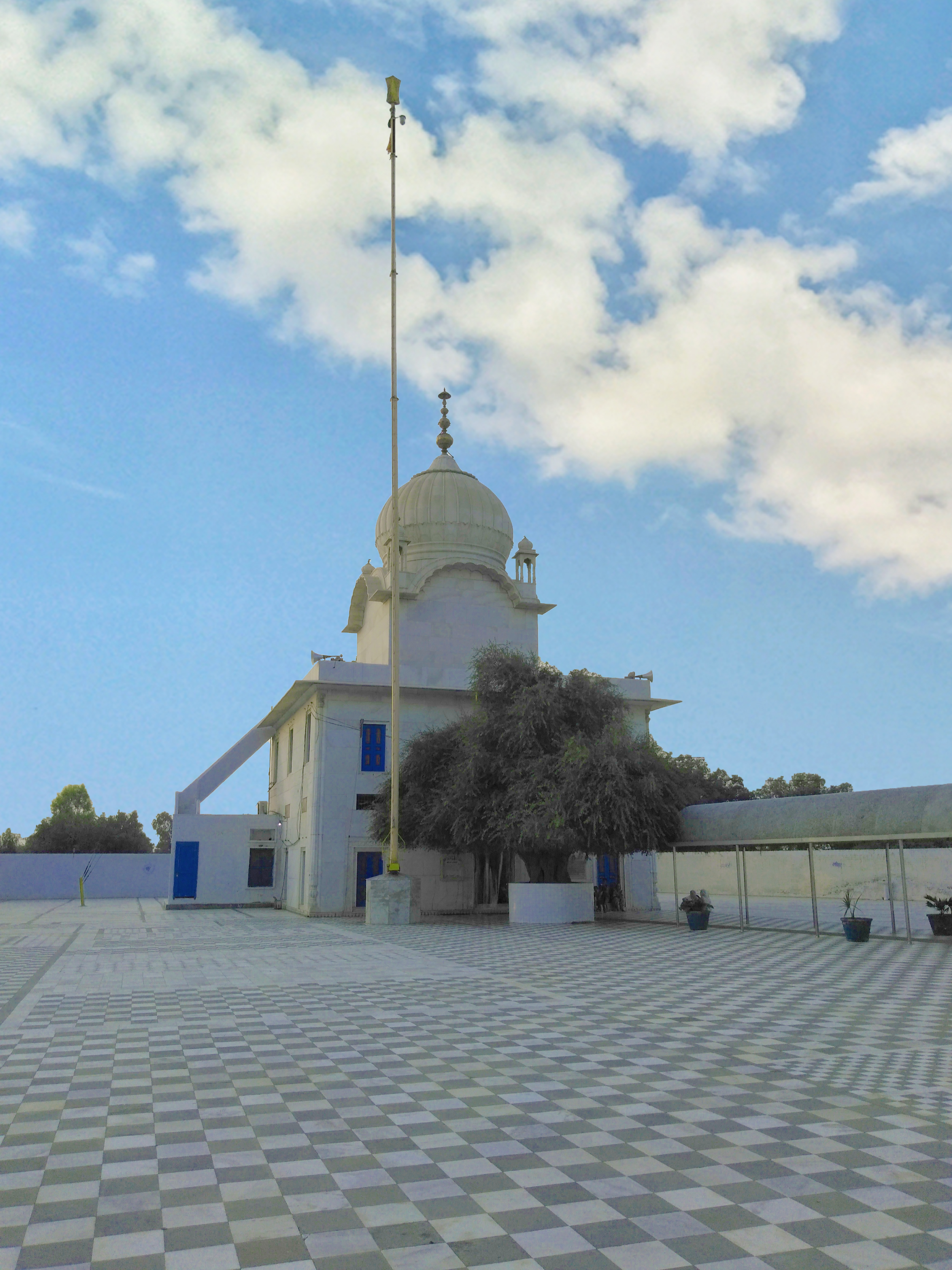
Gurdwara Tibbi Sahib, Sri Muktsar Sahib

The main gurudwara in Sri Muktsar Sahib is Gurudwara Tuti Gandi Sahib, which was built by the first Sikh residents of the city that settled in the city after 1743. The gurudwara has a large holy pool, and the darbar sahib is located on the western bank of the pool. The building has been renovated several times. The holy shrine was built in the memory of the 40 muktas who died fighting for the 10th Sikh guru, Guru Gobind Singh. Tuti gandi, which literally translated means "broken ties", which is referred to Guru Gobind Singh nullifying the document that he was no longer the Guru of the 40 Sikhs, in the context of the battle of Sri Muktsar Sahib. Though the gurudwara attracts several visitors a day, there is a massive devotee footfall on Mela Maghi, celebrated on 13 January every year. The gurudwara also celebrates other religious occasions like the birthdays of Guru Nanak Dev, Guru Gobind Singh and the martyrdom of Guru Arjun Dev and Diwali, when the gurudwara is often illuminated. Shri Kalgidhar Niwas with forty rooms is available here for the devotees to stay during their visit. In the same premises, near the southeastern corner of the pool, is Gurudwara Tambu Sahib, which was built by Maharaja Mohinder Singh of Patiala. 50 metres away from the sarovar lies the Gurudwara Shahidganj Sahib. Built by Raja Wazir Singh of Faridkot, it is believed that it was here that Guru Gobind Singh cremated the bodies of the martyrs. Gurudwara Tibbi Sahib is also associated with the battle of Sri Muktsar Sahib. It was this strategic spot that the guru chose to get a good view of the area, as that spot was located on a small hill, or a tibbi as called in Punjabi

Located around 200 meters east of Gurudwara Tibbi Sahib, is the Gurudwara Rakabsar Sahib, where, according to Sikh chronicles, the stirrup, or rakab in Punjabi, of Guru Gobind Singh's horse snapped. Another gurudwara associated with Guru Gobind Singh in Sri Muktsar Sahib is Gurudwara Sri Datansar Sahib, where he killed a Muslim enemy, when he was attacked while brushing his teeth with a datan, a traditional Indian toothbrush. Gurudwara Taran Taran Sahib, located on Sri Muktsar Sahib-Bathinda road, is also associated with Guru Gobind Singh, where he halted while moving towards Rupana, after winning the battle of Sri Muktsar Sahib.

=== Hindu temples ===
The city has Hindu temples, the prominent ones include Durga Mandir, Shiv Mandir and Mahadev Mandir.

=== Mosque ===
The city has a historical mosque called Jamia Masjid. Also known as Angooran wali maseet, it was built in November 1894 by Nawab Maulvi Razav Ali Mian Badruddin Shah. It features minarets and domes.

=== Church ===
Little Flower Catholic Church in Adarsh Nagar.

=== Jain temple ===
Digamber Jain temple is located in Rambara Bazaar.

=== Mela Maghi ===
An annual event celebrated in the month of January every year, the mela is organized as a tribute to the 40 Sikhs who died fighting for Guru Gobind Singh in the battle of Sri Muktsar Sahib in 1705. Though the mela extends for more than a fortnight, the main event is held on 14 January, a day after Lohri, and is considered as one of the most important of all religious gatherings of the Sikhs. Sikhs consider it to be a pious occasion to take a dip in the holy pond of the Sri Muktsar Sahib gurdwaras on that day. Despite the biting cold, devotees came in droves from Punjab and neighbouring areas, including Haryana and Rajasthan, to pay obeisance at Gurdwaras here. Apart from the religious activities, several political parties hold rallies in the city during the mela. The Mela celebrates the unique diversity of Punjabi tradition and culture in an ambiance representing the ethos of rural India. Several temporary stalls line the road selling a variety of wares from kirpans to kitchen-ware to refurbished clothing. A makeshift amusement park is created, which features circus, giant wheel, merry-go-round, wall of death, toy train and similar rides, along with food stalls.

=== Mukt-e-minar ===
In May 2005, the then chief minister of Punjab, Amrinder Singh, inaugurated Mukt-e-minar, which is the world's tallest khanda. An 81-foot double-edged-sword-shaped structure, it has 40 rings around it, symbolizing the 40 Sikhs that died during the battle of Sri Muktsar Sahib. The memorial was dedicated to the 300th anniversary of the last Mughal-Khalsa battle, where the Khalsa forces defeated the enemy.

== Sports ==
Sri Muktsar Sahib has a stadium called Guru Gobind Singh Stadium, with the facilities for athletics, tennis, basketball, football and kabaddi. The stadium is replete with a standard 400m competitive running track. The stadium also houses a large indoor sports stadium nearby, though presently it is in a state of neglect.

== Education ==
The city's public school system, managed by the Government of Punjab, is administered by Punjab School Education Board, through government schools. The city also has a large number of private schools affiliated with Central Board of Secondary Education, Punjab School Education Board and Council for the Indian School Certificate Examinations.

Sri Muktsar Sahib has a number of colleges for higher education offering degrees in the major streams like arts, commerce, science, law and medical science. Notable colleges in Sri Muktsar Sahib include Government College, Guru Nanak College and Bhai Maha Singh College. The city also has a Punjab University regional centre.

== Transportation ==
=== Buses ===
The intercity buses in Sri Muktsar Sahib are operated by state-run and private bus companies. The government bus operators are Punjab Roadways and PRTC, which provide free travel to women residents of Punjab. Direct buses are available linking Sri Muktsar Sahib to almost all the major cities of Punjab & adjoining states, including the state capital, Chandigarh and the national capital, New Delhi.

=== Rail ===
Sri Muktsar Sahib has a railway station but the city is not well-connected within the Indian Railways. Direct trains are available to Delhi, Bathinda, Ferozepur, Fazilka, and Rewari, among others. Sri Muktsar Sahib acts as a transit point with no trains originating or terminating at the city.

=== Air ===
The nearest airport to Sri Muktsar Sahib, located at a distance of 41 km, is Bathinda Airport, which is a domestic airport. The nearest international airport is Sri Guru Ram Das Ji International Airport, Amritsar, situated 183 km away.

== Notable people born in Sri Muktsar Sahib city ==
1. Gurkeerat Singh: Indian cricketer who plays for Punjab in domestic cricket, and for RC Bangalore in Indian Premier League.

2. Deep Sidhu: Was an Indian actor who used to work in Hindi and Punjabi language films.

3. Ashfaq Ahmed: Was a writer, playwright and broadcaster based in Pakistan.

4. Deepinder Goyal: Co-founder and CEO of Zomato, a multinational restaurant aggregator and food delivery company.
