= Mela Maghi =

Sikh festival

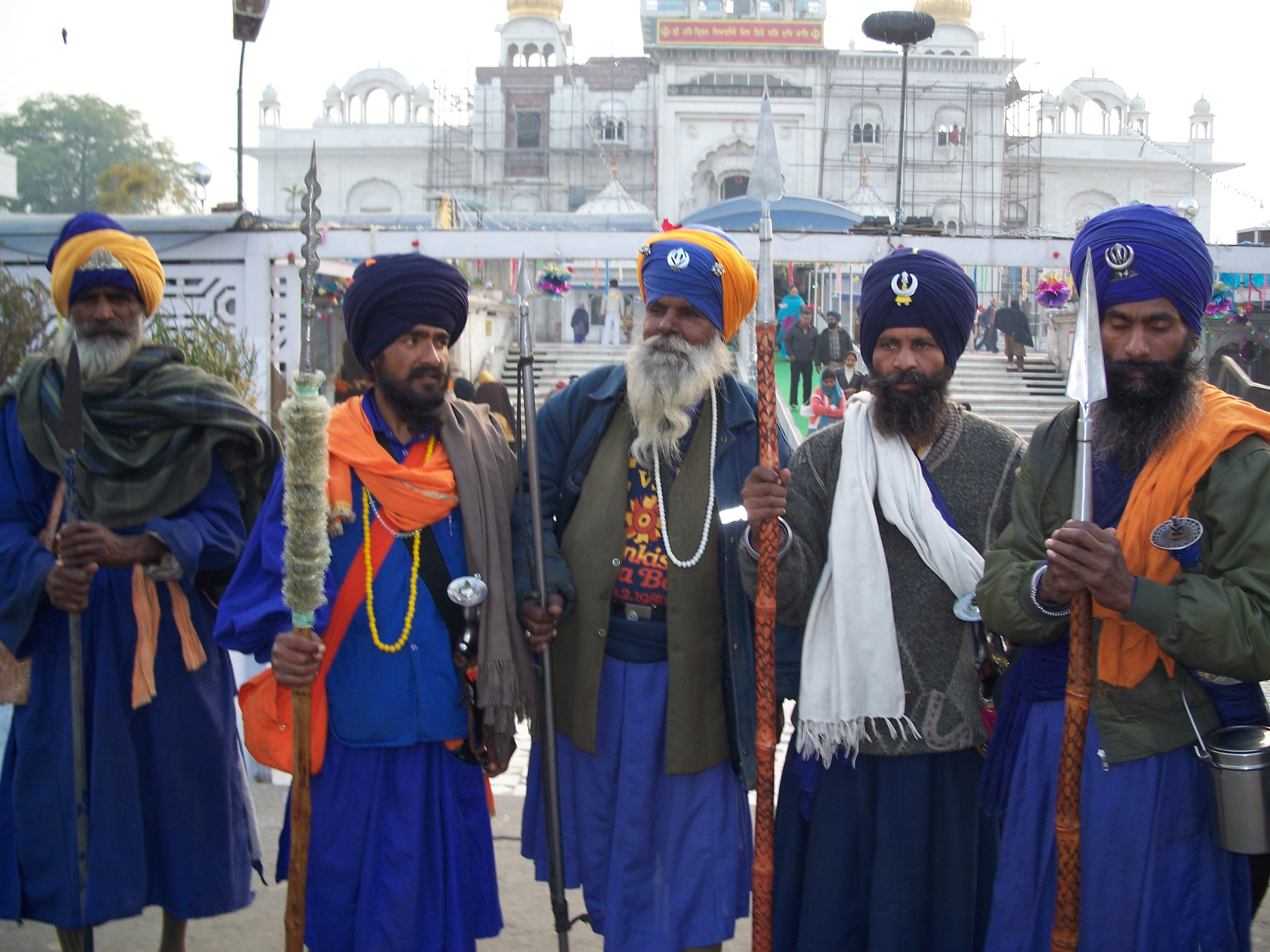
A group of Nihangs who are the chief guests at Maghi mela

Mela Maghi (Punjabi: ਮੇਲਾ ਮਾਘੀ (Gurmukhi)), held at the holy city of Sri Muktsar Sahib each year in January or the month of Magh according to Nanakshahi calendar and it is one of the most important melas or fairs of India and the most important of all religiously significant gatherings of the Sikhs.

== History ==
In Sikhism, the Magha mela – along with Diwali and Vaisakhi – were three festivals recognized by Guru Amar Das who urged Sikhs to gather for a community festival (1552–1574 CE). It is popularly known as Maghi, and it now marks the memory of the forty martyrs during a Muslim-Sikh war (1705 CE) during the time of the Guru Gobind Singh. The largest Maghi gathering is found in Muktsar. According to Pashaura Singh and Louis Fenech, Guru Amar Das built Goindwal Sahib as a Sikh pilgrimage site (tirath). He also built a baoli – stepped water tank – at Goindwal for ritual bathing.

Shri Guru Gobind Singh ordained Maghi as one of the three festivals that would be celebrated by the Sikhs. The other two are Baisakhi and Bandhi chor divas (Diwali)

After the battle of Sri Muktsar Sahib which took place on 3rd May 1705, (21 Vaisakh 1762 Bikrami calendar) Maghi came to be associated with the forty Sikhs and the battle of Sri Muktsar Sahib.

The Maghi fair is held to honour the memory of the forty Sikh warriors killed during the Battle of Muktsar in 1705. Muktsar, originally called Khidrana, was named as Muktsar ("the pool of liberation") following the battle. These forty Sikhs, led by their leader Mahan Singh, had formally deserted Sri Guru Gobind Singh ji in the need of hour, and signed a written memorandum to the effect. When Mai Bhago, a valiant and upright lady, heard of this cowardly act, she scolded the Singh's and inspired them refresh with spirit of bravery for which Sikhs are known. Hence, the unit returned and joined the Guru who was already engaged in action at Khidrana. All forty of them attained martyrdom. The memorandum (bedawa) was torn-down by the Guru himself just before Mahan Singh died.

People gather from all over Punjab, even other parts of India to join the festival which is in fact spread over many days. Merchants display their wares for sale, which include from trinkets to high-end electronics, the weapons Nihangs bear and especially agricultural machinery (since most around are farmers). The country's biggest circuses, Apollo and Gemini, are there as a matter of rule, merry-go-rounds and giant wheels, and the famous Well of Death (trick motorcycling inside consortium of wood planks) are the special attraction for children.

While children enjoy the rides, the area also has several shops selling a variety of goods. These include crockery, home decor, keyrings, posters, toys, utensils, makeup and clothing. The shops generally offer inexpensive products of varying quality. Shopping is therefore accessible at relatively low prices. Electronic Payment options are limited with many vendors accepting cash.

It is also an important occasion from the political point of view, as all the significant politicos, including the chief minister are there on the main day. All major political leaders/ parties hold separate stages to throw political dirt at one another. Such arrangement needs extremely tight police -up which is met by calling out forces, sometimes even CRPF and BSF battalions from neighboring areas.

== See also ==
- List of Sikh festivals
- Maghi
