= Social Reporting Standard =

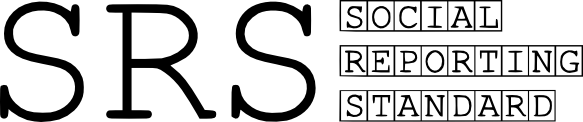
SRS-Logo

The Social Reporting Standard (SRS) provides a standardized reporting guideline for initiatives and projects in the non-profit sector. The term SRS is inspired by the Financial Reporting Standards of for-profit companies.

Unlike traditional businesses, social enterprises and non-profit organisations are not primarily focused on maximizing profits, but rather on social issues. Therefore, the application of Financial Reporting Standards for such organisations is not appropriate. Thus, the development of the SRS, which takes into account the unique goals of not-for-profit organisations, is essential.

Generally speaking, all reporting guidelines in the social sector can be regarded as SRS. Such a concept for reporting standards (accounting and legal) in the social sector has been developed by several experts in the German social sector. Thus far the SRS has received broad support and is widely used. The Social Reporting Standard (SRS) approach is an open non-commercial project.

== Background ==
Similar to the reporting and annual financial statements of for-profit organisations, social entrepreneurs, non-profit organisations, and other organisations with social objectives also regularly report on their activities. For example, they commonly report to the public, their donors, investors and sponsors, authorities, or to their partners.

While for-profit organisations are required to report in accordance with laws of generally accepted principles such as the German "Handelsgesetzbuch (HGB)” (comparable with the US GAAP or the International Financial Reporting Standards (IFRS)), consistent reporting standards for socially oriented organisations, however, have not yet been established. Consistent reporting enables social businesses’ stakeholders to compare information. Comparability is a very important element in addressing potential investors and also relevant for other stakeholders. Complex norms for sustainability reporting standards such as that of the Global Reporting Initiative are not, within reasonable effort, realizable for social organisations to complete. For these reasons, many organisations therefore have to create separate reports in accordance with each individual investor's guidelines, which can lead to wasting valuable resources.

Hence in contrast to for-profit investors, the donors, investors, and financiers in the non-profit sector lack standardized basis for information that they can use for the selection, assessment, and comparison of different projects. As a result, funds and resources are often not applied to areas where they could have the biggest impact. Social businesses often struggle with the acquisition of capital needed to attain their socially oriented objectives.

=== Emergence and participating organisations ===
The starting point in developing the SRS stemmed from research findings of TU Munich and the University of Hamburg.

The SRS is a joint project of Ashoka Germany, Auridis gGmbH, BonVenture Management GmbH, Phineo gAG, Schwab Foundation for Social Entrepreneurship, Spenden.de, TU Munich, and the University of Hamburg with the assistance of PricewaterhouseCoopers Germany. The Vodafone Foundation Germany along with the Federal Ministry of Family Affairs, Senior Citizens, Women and Youth supports research projects for the further development of SRS. In addition, the creation of an English Version of SRS has been supported by the Social Impact Analysts Association (SIAA).

The reporting standard is an open project under the Creative Commons licence and all interested social organisations in Germany can participate. In addition to further developing the standard, a dialogue on entrepreneurial thinking and impact-oriented actions to increase common welfare should also be established. For this purpose the involved organisations founded the Social Reporting Initiative e.V. association in September 2011.

=== Objectives ===
The SRS provides a new reporting framework for stakeholders in the social sector. In particular, it helps to document and communicate the results chain of individual projects. Moreover, several fundamental reporting elements such as organisational structure and finances are systematically captured in the SRS report, which creates a comprehensive picture of the organisation. Another objective of SRS is to promote an impact-orientation of social organisations. This should help focus the competition for donations and funding on a program's impact. Hence, focusing on the effectiveness and impact of program's will become a major issue. The efforts for reporting organisations and recipients of information can be kept minimal by: First, having a clearly defined reporting framework used by a multitude of organisations, donors, investors, and other stakeholders. And second, by using consistent approaches of measuring impact.

== Composition and structure ==
A report according to SRS 2014 consists of three central sections, namely Parts A, B and C. Depending on the organisation and the activity type and complexity, the report can be filled out multiple times.

- Part A describes the purpose of the report and gives an overview and description of the report's scope as well as contact information for the organisation.
- Part B describes each activity and its impact. It focuses on the social problem and the approach to solve it. Central component is the section about the impact on society. Resources used, services provided, and societal effects are contrasted. Furthermore, plans, opportunities, and risks are to be described. Lastly, an introduction given of the participating individuals.
- Part C includes a holistic profile of the organisation and gives an overview on the financials including revenues and expenditures.

Most SRS users report on a single activity provided by an organisation, whereas some organisations report on several activities. In some cases a single activity is implemented by an association of several organisations. Since SRS is modular structured, it is possible to use the standard for different constellations. This enables investors and donors to easily and quickly understand the connections between the different organisations and their activities, allowing them to arrange their support accordingly.

An activity in this sense can be defined as the sum of all actions of an organisation to solve a social problem. Activities are therefore definable programs, projects, and plans including advisory services, courses and training's, services, conferences, technical and other products, publications, awards, lobbying activities, online platforms etc. Sample SRS reports can be viewed and downloaded on the SRS website.

== Application and distribution ==
The SRS was first published in 2010 and has been used by an increasing number of users since then (a current list of adopters is available on the SRS website)). In 2014, a new version of the guidelines was published. Findings from user workshops and phone consultations regarding the SRS 2012 as well as feedback from numerous users were taken into account. The basic concept has proven itself successful and remains unchanged, however, the SRS 2014 is optimized with regards to user-friendliness and significance. Ashoka accepts a report following the SRS guidelines instead of an application form. By now, the major part of Ashoka fellows report in the SRS format. Ashoka itself uses SRS for their own annual reporting, too. BonVenture accepts reports according to SRS as an application for equity and credits. The impact indicators are used in an involvement for planning and evaluating social impact. For in-depth assessments of an organisation the Phineo analysis method recommends the SRS. For the selection process of “Germany’s social entrepreneur of the year” the network of the Schwab Foundation accepts SRS as an application. Network members of the foundation can submit their annual report in the SRS format.

Members of the Vodafone Foundation also use SRS for their annual reporting. Applications for social business angels can also be done via SRS. Startsocial accepts SRS reports as applications, too. The announcements of the Act for Impact program of the Vodafone Foundation Germany and the Social Entrepreneurship Academy are also done according to SRS standards.

SRS is, among others, recommended by "VENRO" (umbrella organisation of development non-governmental organisations in Germany). Also within the scope of the Social Business Initiative of the European Commission, which manages 90 million Euros, the SRS will play a key role in the future as best practice. Within the scope of better place lab Trend reports SRS has been identified as a leading instrument for the documentation of impact.

The SRS can be used by all organisations with social purposes. SRS guidelines primarily address small and medium-sized organisations with social purposes (e.g. social entrepreneurs) and were developed for them in particular. Respectively, the SRS can be used as a reporting tool by all foundations, especially by beneficiary foundations, venture philanthropists, charities and governmental foundations of social services. In the summer of 2013, the SRS was presented at conferences organised by some of Germany's non-statutory welfare services organisations. The first organisations from the welfare sector, “Diakonisches Werk Rosenheim” and in particular “Diakonische Jugendhilfe Oberbayern”, should be mentioned. They are using the SRS for all of their facilities. The first foundation to use the SRS for its annual report was the “Albert-Schweitzer-Foundation”.

The SRS was presented at the Vision Summit 2012, which by now has over 1,000 participants and has been named an internationally leading conference for social innovation, social entrepreneurship, corporate social responsibility, eco business, and social impact business. Additionally, an introduction to the SRS and its use was given during workshops at the summit. The SRS was once more introduced through workshops at the Vision Summit in 2014 in Berlin. Moreover, in April and May 2012 a user consultation session was offered for the first time for actors in this field (sponsored by the Federal Ministry for Family Affairs, Senior Citizens, Women and Youth). Since then, these consultations have been offered several times a year. In February 2013, a multi-stakeholder conference on the “promotion of social innovation in Germany” took place. Over 200 representatives from politics, business and science as well as social entrepreneurs participated in this conference. The Social Reporting Initiative e.V. organised a workshop on organisations’ impact documentation, introducing and discussing SRS.

== International distribution ==
Currently the guidelines are offered in German, English and Spanish. Initiated through the conference ThinkSocial.Act Business in December 2013 in Athens, the SRS guidelines have been translated into Greek. There have been numerous workshops organised in the Czech Republic and meanwhile a Czech version of the guidelines is also available. A translation of the guidelines in French and Hungarian is planned.

== See also ==
- Social entrepreneurship
- Social business
- Social return on investment
- Non-profit organisation

== Literature ==
- Barbara Roder: Reporting im Social Entrepreneurship: Konzeption einer externen Unternehmensberichterstattung für soziale Unternehmer. Gabler 2010.
- Achleitner A., Bassen A., Roder B., Lütjens L.: Ein Standard für die Berichterstattung von Social Entrepreneurs In: Ökologisches Wirtschaften 4 (2009).
- Ann-Kristin Achleitner, Wolfgang Spiess-Knafl, Andreas Heinecke, Mirjam Schöning, Abigail Noble: The Social Investment Manual. An Introduction for Social Entrepreneurs (2011).
- Bittner, Phillip: Wie wirke ich? Hilfe für Social Enterprises (2014)
- Scheck, Barbara: A Standard for Social Impact Reporting (May 2014)
- Wörrlein, Lena M.: Ein Standard für wirkungsorientierte Berichterstattung – der Social Reporting Standard In: npoR 1 (2015)
- Wörrlein, Lena M.: Was bringt’s eigentlich? In: Couragiert-Magazin 4 (2014)
- Hölscher P., Hinze F.: Wirkungsketten knüpfen und belegen In: Sozialwirtschaft 1 (2015)
