= Chabhal Kalan =

- Town
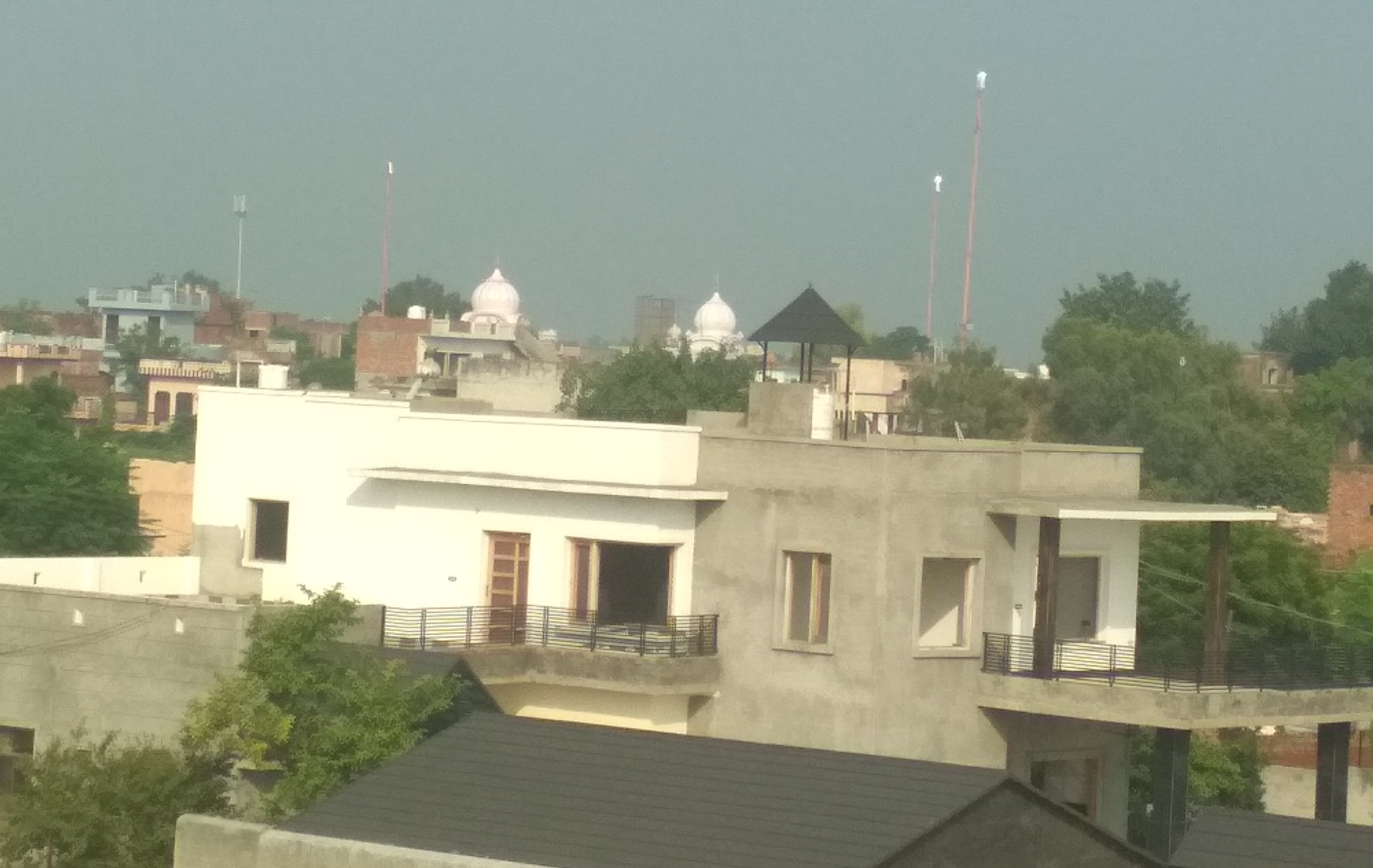
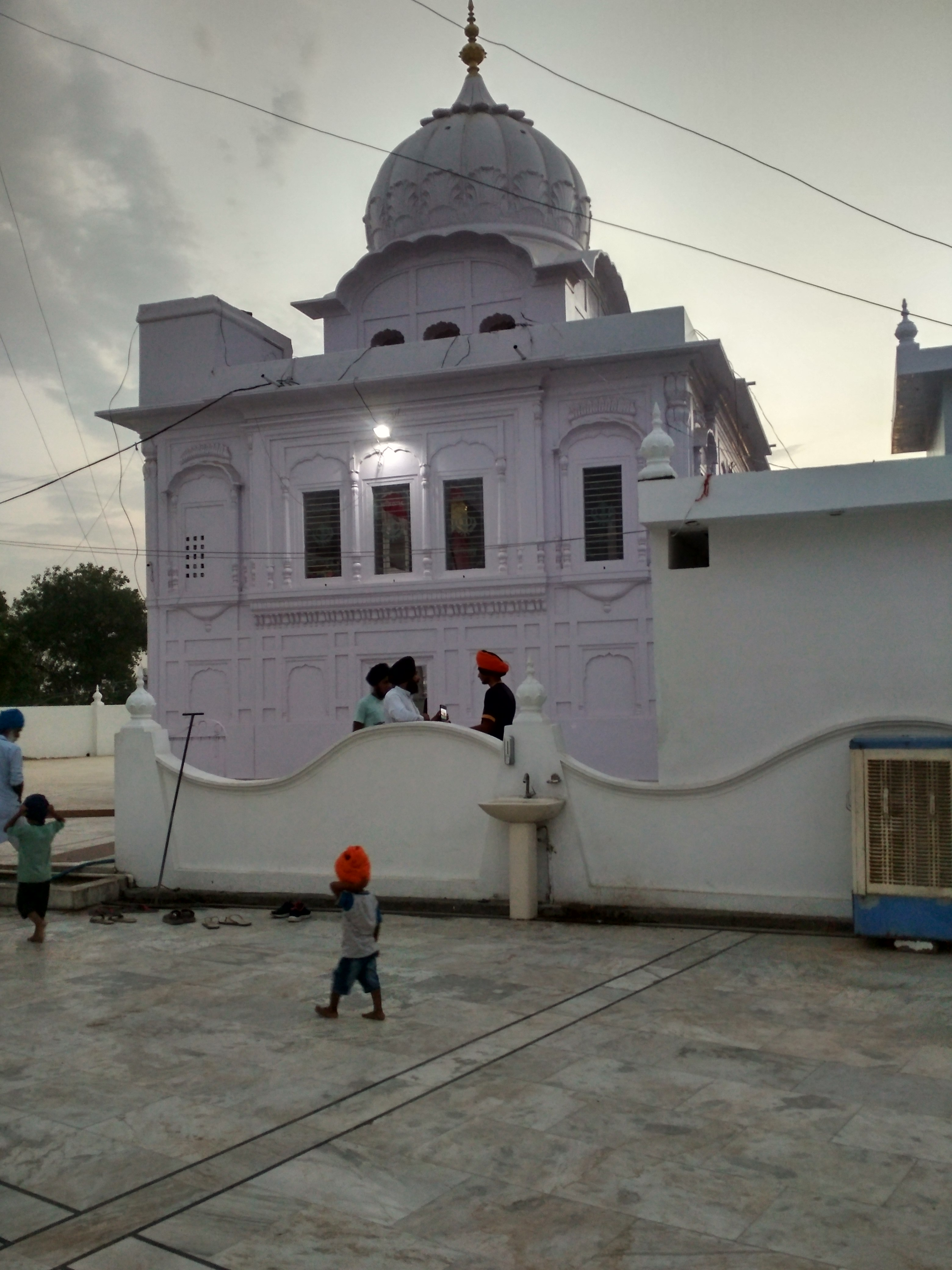
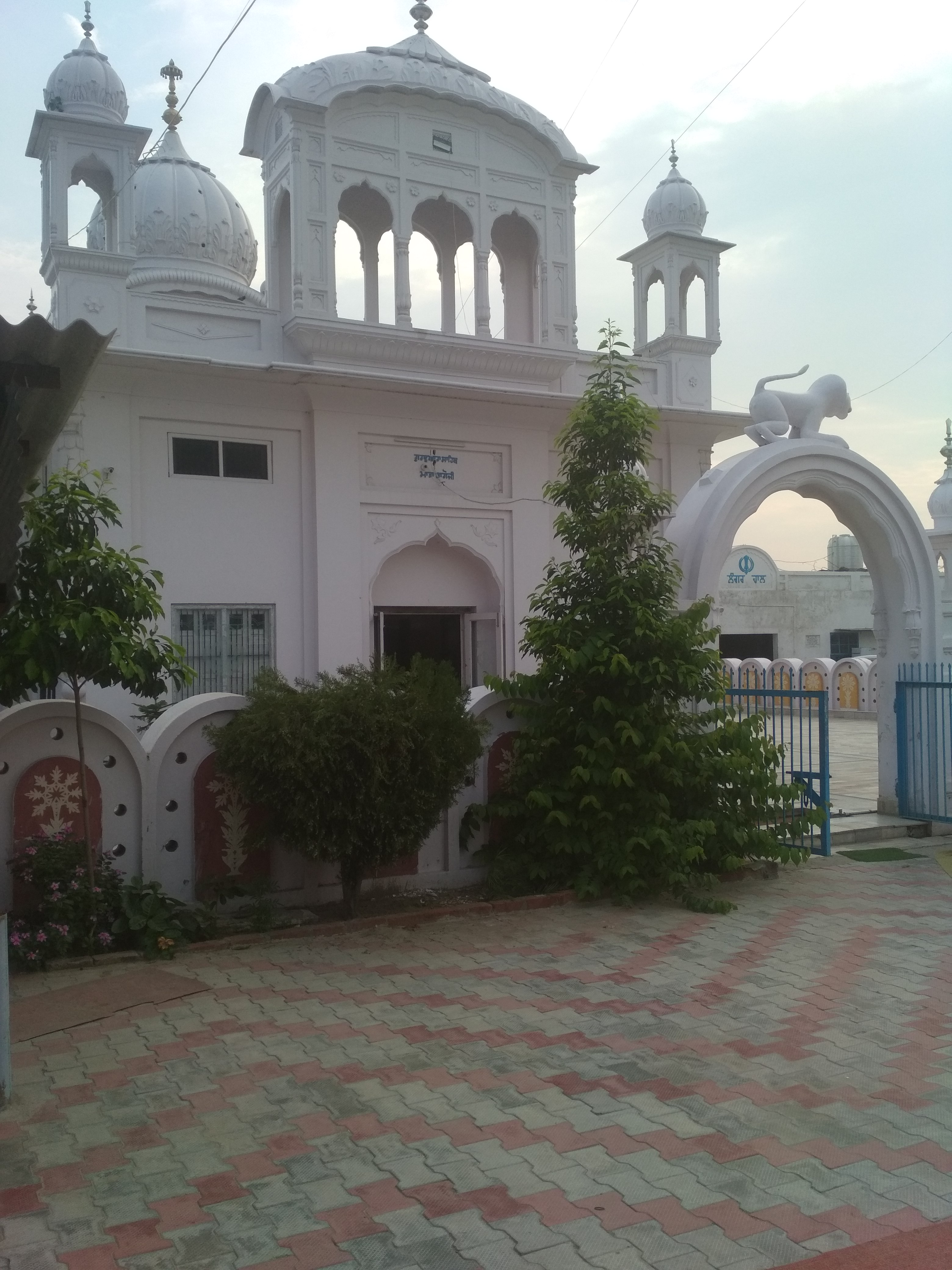
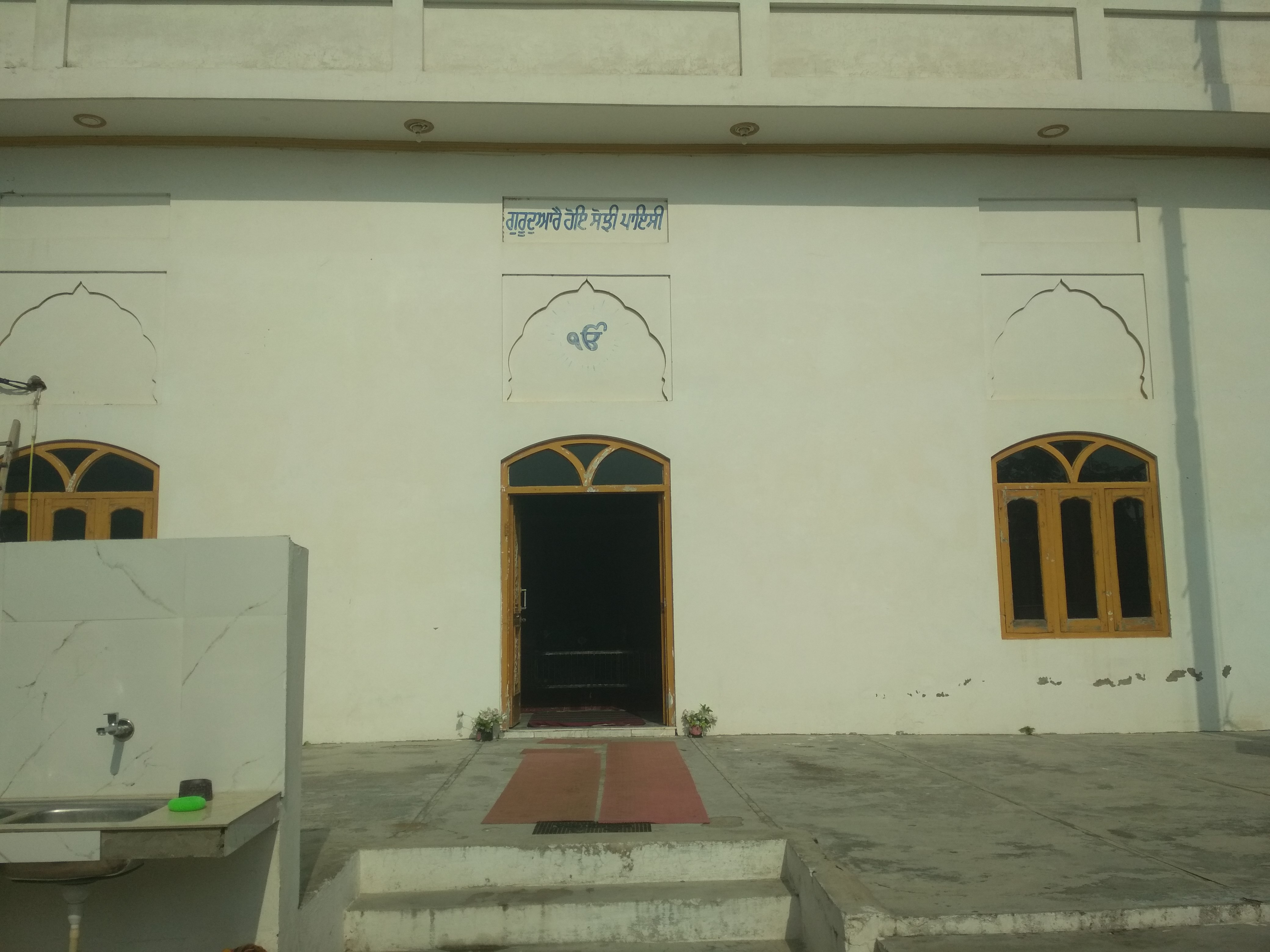
- Jhabal Kalan Skyline, Gurdwara Bibi Veero Ji, Gurdwara Mata Bhag Kaur, Gurdwara Baghel Singh

- Location in Punjab, India Chabhal Kalan (India)
- Coordinates: 31.479832°N 74.794289°E
- Country: India
- State: Punjab
- District: Tarn Taran

Languages
  - Official: Punjabi
- Time zone: UTC+5:30 (IST)
- Climate: Sub Tropical (Köppen)

Chabhal Kalan (also known as Jhabal Kalan) is a town and a nagar panchayat in Tarn Taran district of the Majha region of Indian state of Punjab. Guru Hargobind Sahib, the sixth Guru of the Sikhs, also visited Chabhal Kalan. The town is located 13 miles (21 km) away from Amritsar city.

== History ==
It was the birthplace of Maharaja Baghel Singh, Mai Bhago Ji, and Bhai Langah Dhillon Under the Mughal empire the village contributed a third of the toral 9 Lac revenue collected by its main divisional pargana - Patti, Punjab. The village was in a jagir (feudal fief) given by Akbar to Bibi Bhani. as a wedding present.

== Notable people ==
- Mai Bhago (1670-1720), Sikh female warrior
- Baghel Singh (c. 1730 – c. 1802), general
- Karam Singh (1884–1930), historian
