= Special Repair Service =

The Special Repair Service (SRS) was a British civilian organisation that operated during the Second World War under the control of the Ministry of Works. Its function was to travel anywhere in Great Britain to carry out essential building and structural repair work.

SRS teams were usually the first on the scene of any new government construction job, laying the foundations and setting up camps for the main labour force. SRS men usually travelled by rail, but the organisation also operated Flying Squads, which travelled in lorries with caravan bodies in which they lived until permanent accommodation was available.

The service recruited only men born before 1910 (although younger men were eligible if they had been certified unfit for military service) who had previous experience in the building industry. They signed on for a year at a time and were paid top building industry rates.
