= Kotkapura =

- City
- Location in Punjab, India
- Coordinates: 30.5833°N 74.9°E
- Country: India
- State: Punjab
- District: Faridkot
- Established: 1661
- Founder: Kapura

Area
  - Total: 17.25 km^{2} (6.66 sq mi)
- Elevation: 208 m (682 ft)

Population (2011)
  - Total: 91,979
  - Density: 5,332/km^{2} (13,810/sq mi)

Languages
  - Official: Punjabi, Hindi
- Time zone: UTC+5:30 (IST)
- PIN: 151204
- Vehicle registration: PB-79

Kotkapura is a historic city in Faridkot district, Punjab, India. 15 km from Faridkot City, 50 km from Bathinda, 40 km from Moga and 30 km from Muktsar in the state of Punjab, India. It is the largest city in the Faridkot district and has a large cotton market. It takes around 15 minutes by bus from Faridkot, 4 hours by road from Chandigarh and 2 hours from Ludhiana, and 8 hours from New Delhi to reach the city. It is a central city on route to Ganganagar, Ludhiana, Bathinda, Firozpur, etc. Kotkapura takes its name from its founder, Nawab Kapur Singh, and the word 'Kot', meaning a small fort – literally the 'Fort of Kapura'.

Kotkapura, like many other small cities in India, is undergoing modernization. Shastri Market or Maheshwari Street established by Bansi Dhar Maheshwari (1875-1935) is one of the most populous and largest markets in Punjab. KotkKapura has also been called the 'City of White Gold' due to its cotton market, which was once the largest cotton market in Asia.

The city is known for its "Dhodha Sweet" and "Atta Chicken" both of which are exported outside India. Kotkapura was also famous for its ever-closed railway crossing gate on the Kotkapura–Muktsar highway. However, a flyover has saved the town from this notorious landmark.

== History ==
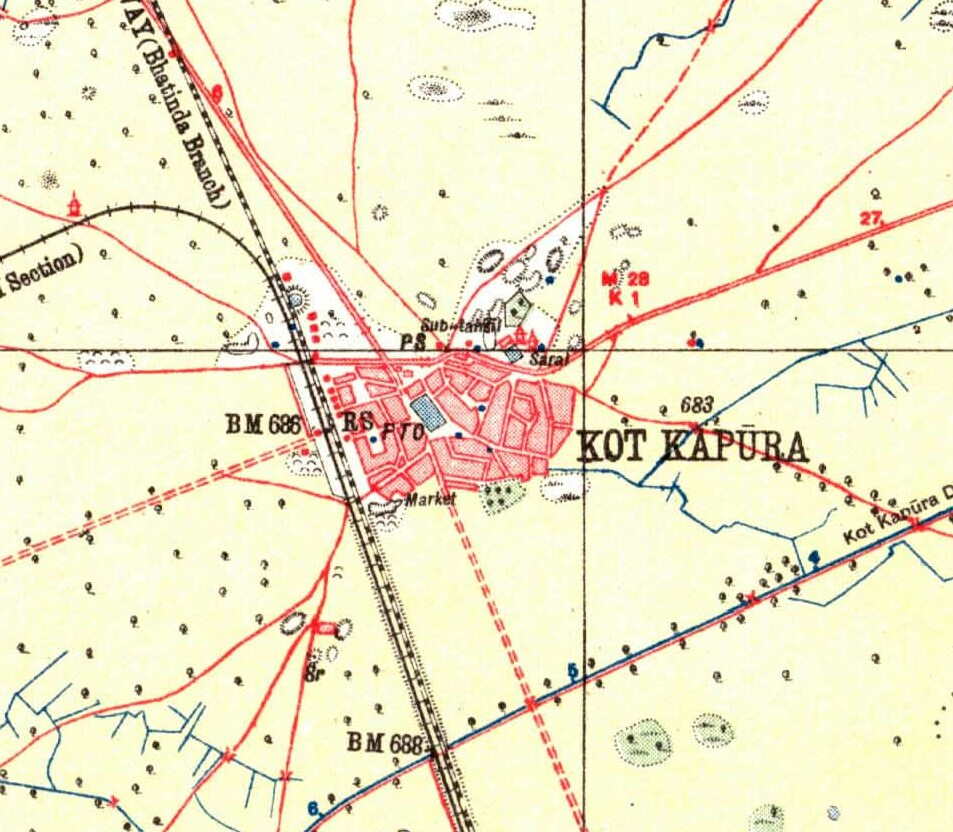
Settlement of Kot Kapura, Survey of India geographical block-map for 45 J)14 Ferozepore District (1913).

Bhallan Brar, founder of the Faridkot principality, was an ardent follower of Guru Har Gobind, the 6th Sikh Guru. He helped Guru Har Gobind in the Battle of Mehraj, but died issue-less in 1643. He was succeeded by his nephew, Kapura Singh Brar, who founded the town of Kot Kapura in 1661 and then subsequently was handed over to the Khemka family to govern the township and also crowned the khemka as its province. Khemka family trust takes care of the complete township till now. Nawab Kapura was the chaudhry of eighty-four villages. Guru Gobind Singh, the 10th Guru of the Sikhs, en route from Machhiwara, after staying at Dina and after short stopovers at various other places, reached Kotkapura and asked Nawab Kapura Brar for his fort to fight the pursuing Mughal army. Kapura was a Sikh, but did not want to earn the ire of the Mughals by helping Guru Gobind Singh openly in his war with them; otherwise, the famous last battle of Muktsar (Khidrane Di Dhaab; now a historic town) between Guru Gobind Singh and the Mughal army would have been fought at Kot Kapura. However, Nawab refused the fort to the guru. Guru Gobind Singh was displeased with Chaudary Kapura for not assisting him and went onward to Dhilwan Kalan, where Sodhi Kaul provided him assistance. Kapura was eventually hanged by Isa Khan Main, a Punjabi Muslim warlord. A mural formerly painted on a wall of Gurdwara Guru Sar, Bargarhi depicted a meeting between Guru Gobind Singh and Rai Jagga, a local chieftain of Kot Kapura.

== Climate ==
The climate of the Kotkapura is, on the whole, dry and is characterized by a very hot summer, a short rainy season, and a cold winters. Average annual rainfall is in a range of 20 to 40 mm (0.79 to 1.57 in). Summer temperatures can be as high as 45 °C (113 °F); and winter temperatures as low as 5 °C (41 °F). The weather is generally dry but also highly humid from mid May to end of August due to farmers irrigating the fields. There is no meteorological observatory in the district. Some rainfall occurs during the pre-monsoon months, mostly in the form of thunder-showers and in the cold season. The skies are mostly clear or lightly clouded during the whole year. Winds are generally light in the area, and are northerly to north-westerly, at times south-easterly, throughout the year. But, during the summer and monsoon seasons winds from directions between north-east and south-east blow on many days. The climate is mainly dry, characterized by a very hot summer, a short rainy season and a bracing winter.

Climate data for Kotkapura
Month	Jan	Feb	Mar	Apr	May	Jun	Jul	Aug	Sep	Oct	Nov	Dec	Year
Mean daily maximum °C (°F)	22 (72)	25 (77)	31 (88)	38 (100)	43 (109)	44 (111)	41 (106)	38 (100)	38 (100)	36 (97)	30 (86)	24 (75)	34 (93)
Mean daily minimum °C (°F)	5 (41)	6 (43)	11 (52)	13 (55)	22 (72)	22 (72)	21 (70)	18 (64)	21 (70)	17 (63)	11 (52)	8 (46)	15 (58)
Average rainfall mm (inches)	0 (0)	27 (1.1)	51 (2.0)	0 (0)	0 (0)	12 (0.5)	78 (3.1)	51 (2.0)	72 (2.8)	0 (0)	5 (0.2)	5 (0.2)	301 (11.9)
Average rainy days	4	5	6	6	7	8	16	15	9	2	2	2	82
Source: World Weather Online

== Demographics ==
The city is home to about 92 thousand people out of which 53% are Male and 47% are female. Punjabi is the most widely spoken language in the city with some people speaking Hindi and its dialects. Hindus contribute 52% of the total population and are the largest religious community followed by Sikhs which contribute 47% to the total population. Literacy Rate of the city is around 77%.

The table below shows the population of different religious groups in Kot Kapura city, as of 2011 census.

Population by religious groups in Kotkapura city, 2011 census
Religion	Total	Female	Male
Hindu	47,940	22,567	25,373
Sikh	42,953	20,329	22,624
Muslim	508	215	293
Christian	280	125	155
Jain	108	51	57
Buddhist	42	19	23
Other religions	30	15	15
Not stated	118	60	58
Total	91,979	43,381	48,598

== Environment and health ==
A South African Board Certified Candidate Clinical Metal Toxicologist, visiting Faridkot city in Punjab, India, instrumental in having hair and urine samples taken (2008/9) of 149/53 children respectively, who affected with birth abnormalities including physical deformities, neurological and mental disorders. These samples were shipped to Microtrace Mineral Lab, Germany.

At the onset of the action research project, it was expected that heavy metal / chemistry toxicity might be implicated as reasons why these children were so badly affected. Surprisingly, high levels of uranium were found in 88% of the samples, and in the case of one child, the levels were more than 60 times the maximum safe limit.

A study, carried out amongst intellectually disabled children in the Malwa region of Punjab, revealed 87% of children below 12 years and 82% beyond that age having uranium levels high enough to cause diseases, also uranium levels in samples of three kids from Kotkapura and Faridkot were 62, 44 and 27 times higher than normal.

An investigation carried out The Observer newspaper, in 2009, revealed the possible that cause of contamination of soil and ground water in Malwa region of Punjab, to be the fly ash from coal burnt at thermal power plants, which contains high levels of uranium and ash as the region has state's two biggest coal-fired power stations.

Unscientific farming practices, that emerged after the introduction of Green Revolution, are also alleged to be a reason for growing incidence of not just cancer but also, high rates of spontaneous abortions, reproductive ailments, genetic deformities, anaemia, diarrhoea, vomiting, fluorosis and a host of skin ailments including rashes and boils.

A 2007 epidemiological study found that the surface waters of Malwa region are contaminated with arsenic, cadmium, chromium, selenium and mercury primarily due to the discharge of untreated waste water from surrounding industries. With increasing poisoning of the soil, the region once hailed as the home to the Green revolution, now due to excessive use of chemical fertilizer, is being termed the "Other Bhopal", and "even credit-takers of the Revolution have begun to admit they had been wrong, now that they see wastelands and lives lost to farmer suicides in this 'granary of India'".

== Transport ==
=== Railways ===
Kotkapura Junction railway station serves the city as its Railway Station. It is connected with the cities of Bathinda, Ferozepur, Fazilka and Muktsar through railway lines. Many long route trains pass through Kotkapura on its way to other major cities.

=== Roadways ===
Kotkapura's Bus Stand is a hub for buses to nearby cities. The Punjab Roadways (Punbus) and PRTC and other Private Companies buses connects this city to other major cities of Punjab. Cycle rickshaw and E-Rickshaws are the major form of transport within the city. State Highway 16 which connects Moga and Malout passes through the city.

=== Air ===
Sri Guru Ram Dass Jee International Airport in Amritsar and Bathinda domestic airport are the nearest, about 90 km away.
