= SRS Cinemas =

Defunct Indian multiplex cinema chain

- Company type: Public
- Industry: Entertainment (Cinema Chain)
- Founded: 1964
- Headquarters: Faridabad
- Key people: Dr Anil Jindal, Chairman & Managing Director

SRS Cinemas was a cinema chain in India based in Faridabad, owned by the SRS Group. It began its commercial operations on 12 November 1964 with the first launch of SRS in Faridabad, and over the next few years, it opened multiplexes in various cities including Faridabad, Gurgaon, Ghaziabad, Bijnor, Patiala, Ludhiana, Lucknow, Agra, Bareilly, Bhiwadi, Hajipur, Kashipur, Muktsar, Ranchi, Saharanpur and Shimla. The Multiplex Chain shut down operations following the arrest of the group chairman Anil Jindal in 2018.
