= Kapura Singh Brar =

Founder of Kot Kapura town

Nawab Kapura Singh Brar (1625–1708), also known as Kapura Chaudry, was a Jat leader the accredited progenitor of both the Faridkot and Kot Kapura minor Phulkian houses. Also responsible for founding the town of Kot Kapura in 1661. He provided assistance to Guru Gobind Singh after the guru's escape from Chamkaur in 1705.

== Life ==
Kapura Singh was born in Panjgrain, Punjab, to Chaudury Lala Brar in 1625. Chaudury Lala Brar was the younger brother of Nawab Bhallan Chand Brar, the head of the Brar clan and an ardent follower of Guru Hargobind. Bhallan died issueless in 1634, being succeeded by Kapura, his nephew.

During his reign over the Brar clan and jagirdari territories in the area around Kot Kapura, the fort of Kot Kapura was constructed in 1661. Kapura also engaged in incessant warfare with the neighbouring Rajput clans over historic territory disputes and due to his conquest of their jagirdari holds. Kapura did not assist Guru Gobind Singh by warding off the imperial armies in-pursuit of the guru after the Battle of Chamkaur, as he was fearful of Mughal reprisal, which drew displeasure from the Sikh guru. Thus, the guru went to Dhilwan Kalan where he was aided by Sodhi Kaul. However, when the guru was encamped in the territory controlled by the Brars, Kapura paid a visit to the guru's camp and was shocked by the veneration of weapons practiced by the Sikhs, with the guru explaining the importance of weapon-adoration to Kapura in-response.

Kapura Singh supported Guru Gobind Singh in the Battle of Muktsar, originally known as the battle of Khidrana, with men and military vantage. After this, Kapura Singh was baptised by Guru Gobind Singh in 1705. He was given a khanda and shield.

== Death ==
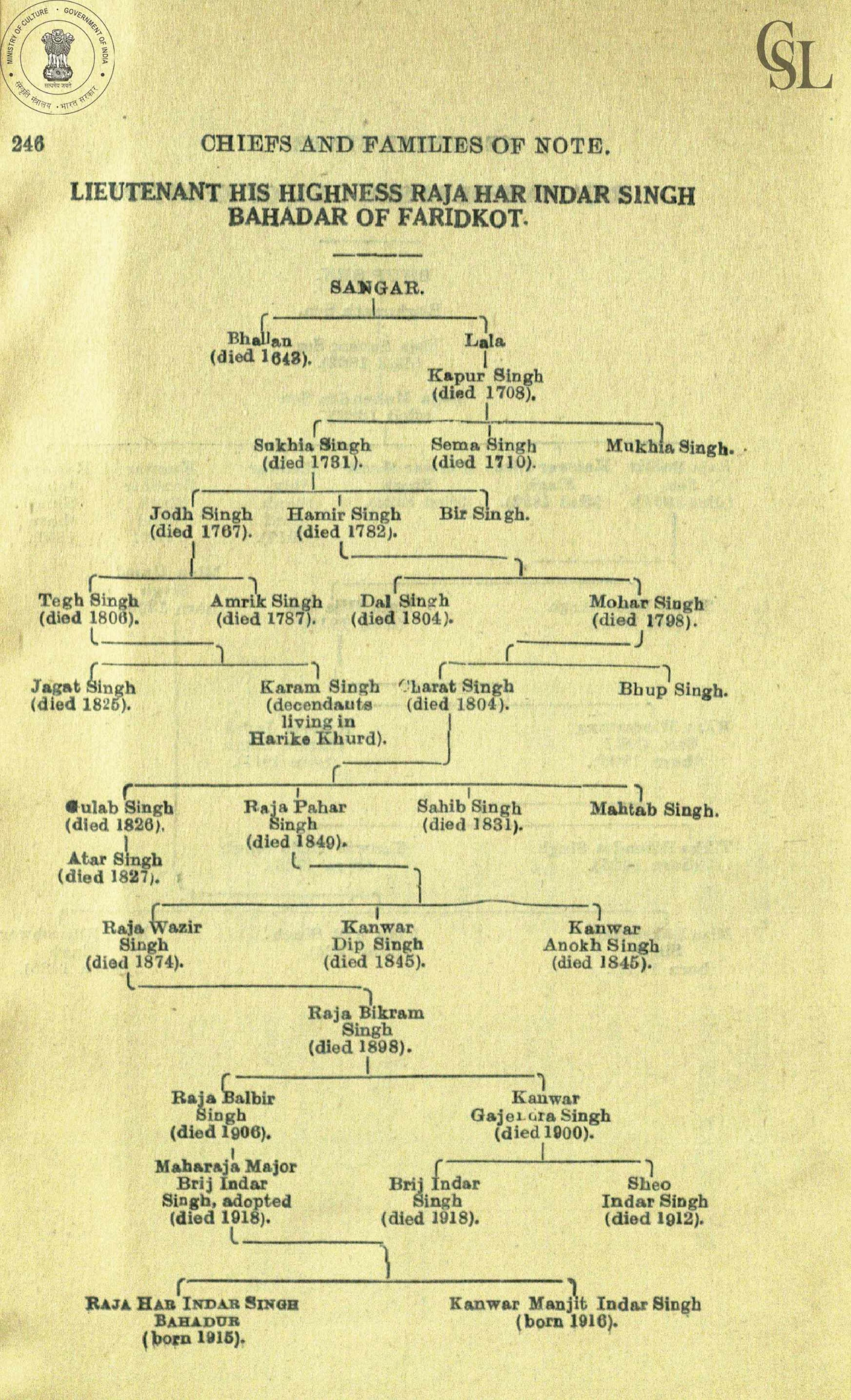
Genealogical pedigree (family-tree) of the ruling family of Faridkot State, Punjab, revised pedigree-table (1940). They are descended from Kapura.

Kapura Singh Brar was killed by a Manj Rajput chief, Rai Isa Khan Manj, in 1708. An on-going feud between the Phulkian houses and multiple Rajput houses had led to numerous prior altercations and conflicts, ultimately leading to the defeat of Kapura Singh as well. This assassination was avenged by Kapura Singhs's sons Sukhia Singh, Mukhia Singh and Sema Singh. Kapura was succeeded by his elder son Sukhia Singh Brar.
