= Mai Bhago =

Sikh warrior woman (1670–1720)

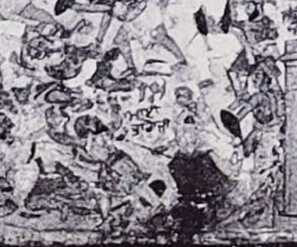
- Mai Bhago in-battle, from a mural depicting the Battle of Muktsar (also known as the 'Battle of Khidrana') from Gurdwara Baba Atal Rai, circa 19th century (no longer extant)
- Born: 1670; Chabhal Kalan, Punjab
- Died: 1720 (aged 49–50); Nanded, Maharastra
- Spouse: Bhai Nidhan Singh of Patti
- Father: Bhai Malo Shah
- Religion: Sikhism

Mai Bhago also known as Mata Bhag Kaur, was a Sikh woman who led Sikh soldiers against the Mughals in 1705. She was an exceptionally skilled warrior on the battlefield and is revered as a warrior saint in Sikhism. She was known for rallying the 40 Sikhs (Chali Mukte) who abandoned Guru Gobind Singh at the siege of Anandpur Sahib and bringing them back to fight.

== Biography ==
=== Early life ===
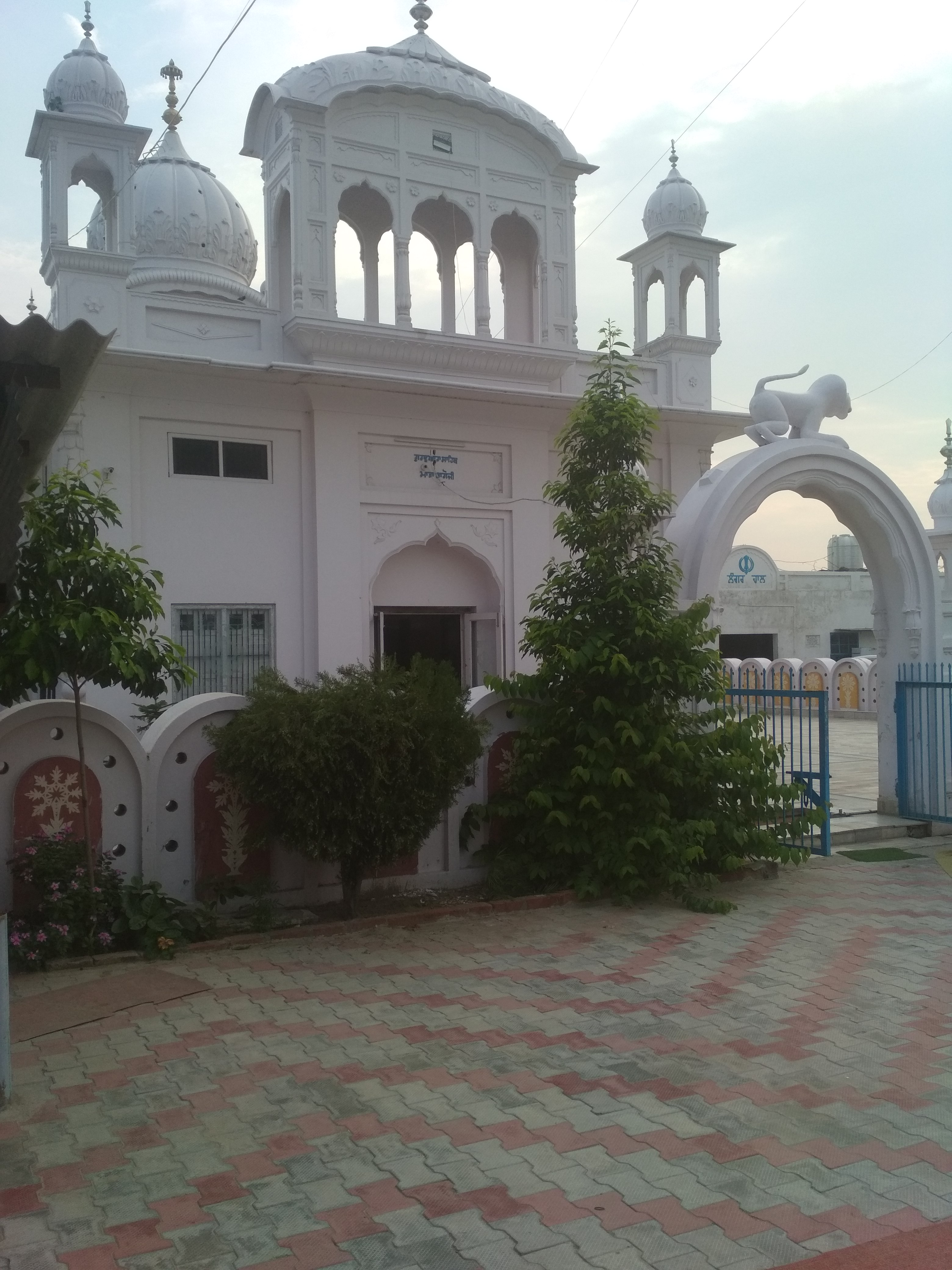
Gurdwara Mai Bhago

Mai Bhago was born into Jat family, her family's ancestral village of Chabhal Kalan, in a sikh family at Jhabal Kalan, in the present-day Tarn Taran district of the Punjab . Mai Bhago was a staunch Sikh by birth and had her upbringing in a devout Sikh family. Mai Bhago's father, Malo Shah, was enrolled in Guru Hargobind's army and like her father Mai Bhago learned Shaster vidya (training in arms). Mai Bhago was the granddaughter of Bhai Pero Shah who was younger brother of the famous Bhai Langah the chief of 84 villages who had converted to Sikhism during the time of Guru Arjan Dev (1563–1606), the fifth Sikh Guru. She had two brothers Dilbagh Singh and Bhag Singh. When she was young her parents took her to Anandpur Sahib to do darshan (glimpse) of Guru Gobind Singh. She married Bhai Nidhan Singh of Patti.

=== Mughal confrontation ===
In attempt to capture the Guru the large Mughal army led by Wazir Khan (of Sirhind) under the orders of Emperor Aurangzeb proceeded to Anandpur Sahib alongside the Mughal Armies of Lahore and Kashmir.

==== Disbandment of the Chali Mukte (40 "liberated" Sikhs) ====
On around 1704 the Mughal hill chiefs had surrounded Anandpur Sahib and were demanding it be evacuated stopping provisions for food and the siege lasting a few months. They announced that any Sikh who would say that "he/she is not anymore a Sikh of Guru Gobind" would be left untouched while others would be "done to death". A group of 40 Sikhs (Chali Mukte), led by Mahan Singh Rataul, told Guru Gobind Singh that they were not his Sikhs anymore. The Guru told them that they would have to write a document that said "We are not your Sikhs anymore" and sign it. All forty Sikhs (except one: 'Bedava') wrote their names on this document, and left Guru Gobind Singh.

==== Mai Bhago's retaliation ====
Mai Bhago was distressed to hear that some of the Sikhs of her neighbourhood, who had gone to Anandpur to fight for Guru Gobind Singh, had deserted him under adverse conditions. She criticised them openly; hearing her taunts, these Sikhs were ashamed of their betrayal. Mai Bhago rallied the deserters, and persuaded them to meet with the Guru and apologize to him. She set off with them (and some other Sikhs) to seek out the Guru, who were traveling across the Malwa.

==== Unfolding events at Anandpur Sahib ====
===== The Guru leaving Anandpur fort =====
A messenger arrived with an oath signed by Aurangzeb on a copy of the Quran, assuring the Guru that if he came out of the fort, permanent peace would be negotiated on honourable terms. The oath of the Emperor was further supported by an oath signed by all the Generals of the Mughal army and the Hill Chiefs. Guru Gobind Singh did not trust these assurances, but to show the real face of the Mughals, the Guru nevertheless decided to leave the fort.

===== Separation of the Guru's family =====
Meanwhile, Guru Gobind Singh evacuated the fort of Anandpur. His children had already been separated in the retreat by the betraying Mughal army and the Hill Chiefs. The two youngest ones, Sahibzada Zorawar Singh and Sahibzada Fateh Singh, had gone along with their grandmother Mata Gujari Kaur (mother of Guru Gobind Singh Ji) while the elder two, Sahibzada Ajit Singh and Sahibzada Jhujhar Singh, had gone with their father. At the battle of Chamkaur, the Guru's elder sons were killed and attained martyrdom. The Guru left Chamkaur on the order of the Panj Pyare. Guru Gobind Singh's forces travelled day and night through the jungles of the Malva region with the imperial Mughal forces of Aurangzeb in constant pursuit.

==== Battle of Muktsar at Khidrana ====
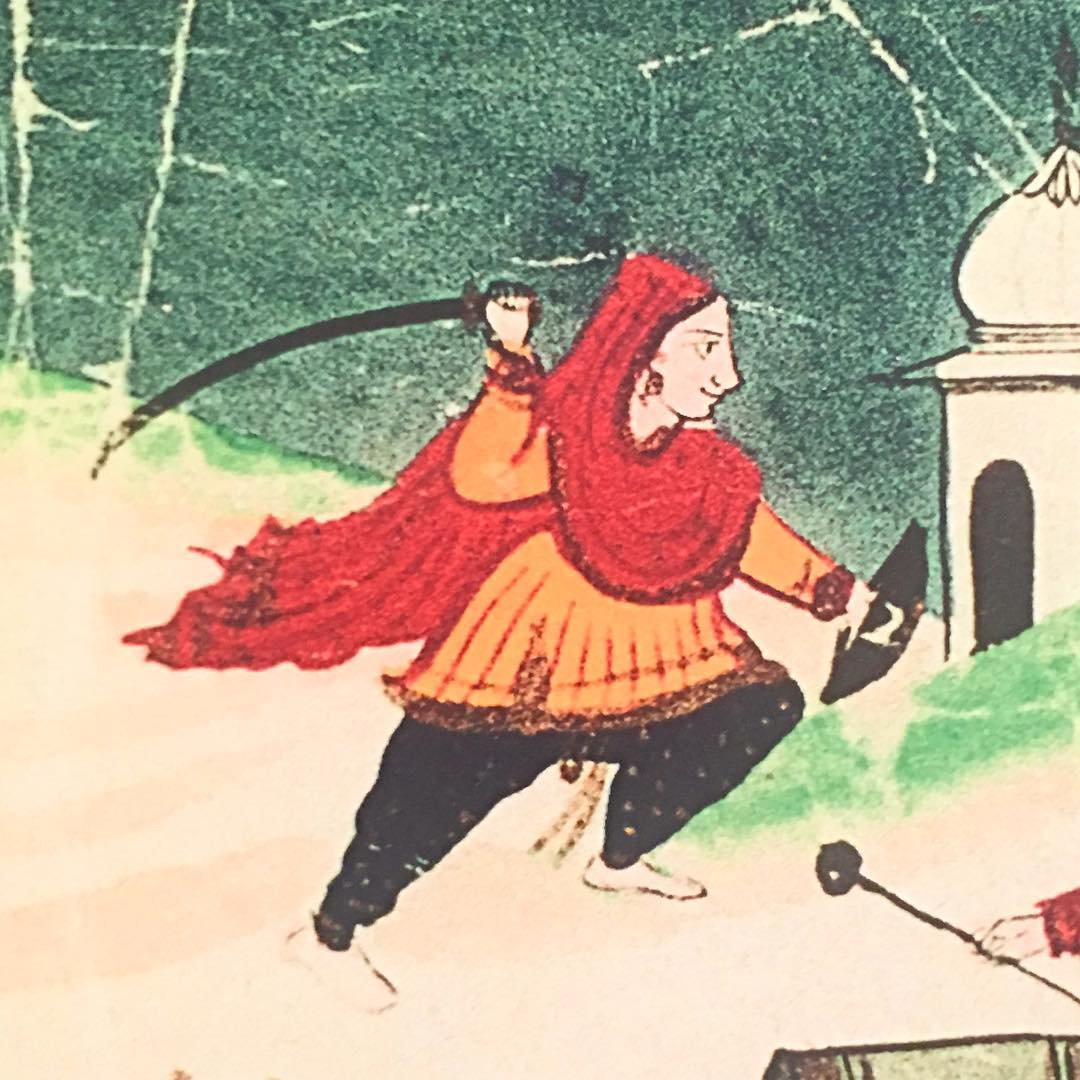
Detail from a painting showing Mai Bhago in the Battle of Muktsar, Sikh school, Punjab Plains, late 19th century

The Guru had reached the village of Khidrana, when Mai Bhago and the men reached khidrana. She led stopped near the dhab, or pool, of Khidrana, the only source of water in the area which was overtaken by the Mughal imperial army pursuing the Guru.

Mai Bhago and her men attacked the pursuing Mughals' army of 10,000 soldiers. Mai Bhago & the 40 liberated ones eventually forced the imperial Mughal army to retreat. while the Guru's forces showered arrows onto the Mughals from nearby high ground. When Guru Gobind Singh visited the battlefield, he found all dead except Mai Bhago and the previous leader of the deserters, Mahan Singh. Mahan Singh, who had been seriously wounded, died as the Guru took him into his lap. All forty of the Sikhs who came to redeem themselves died as well as Mai Bhago's brothers and husband and attained martyrdom in this pitched battle. Some sources say Mai Bhago's children were martyred there too.

Guru Gobind Singh blessed those forty dead as the Chali Mukte, Forty Liberated Ones. He took into his care Mai Bhago, who had suffered serious injury in the battle.

=== Mai Bhago Kaur residing with the Guru ===
Mai Bhago stayed with Guru Gobind Singh at Talwandi Sabo. She may have adopted the garb of a Nihang. When the Guru went to Hazur Sahib she became one of ten other bodyguards of the Guru arming herself with a large lance (weighing about 102 pounds) and musket and did so in male attire.

=== Mai Bhag Kaur at Janwada ===
After the death of Guru Gobind Singh Ji at Nanded in 1708, Mai Bhag Kaur retired further south. She settled down at Janwada, 11 km from Bidar in Karnataka, setting up her dera where she immersed in meditation and taught Gurmat (The Guru's way) living a long life. Her hut in Janwada has now been converted into a place of worship and learning, Gurdwara Tap Asthan Mai Bhago. At Nanded, too, a hall within the compound of Takht Sachkhand Sri Hazur Sahib marking the site of her former residence is known as Bunga Mai Bhago.

== Legacy ==
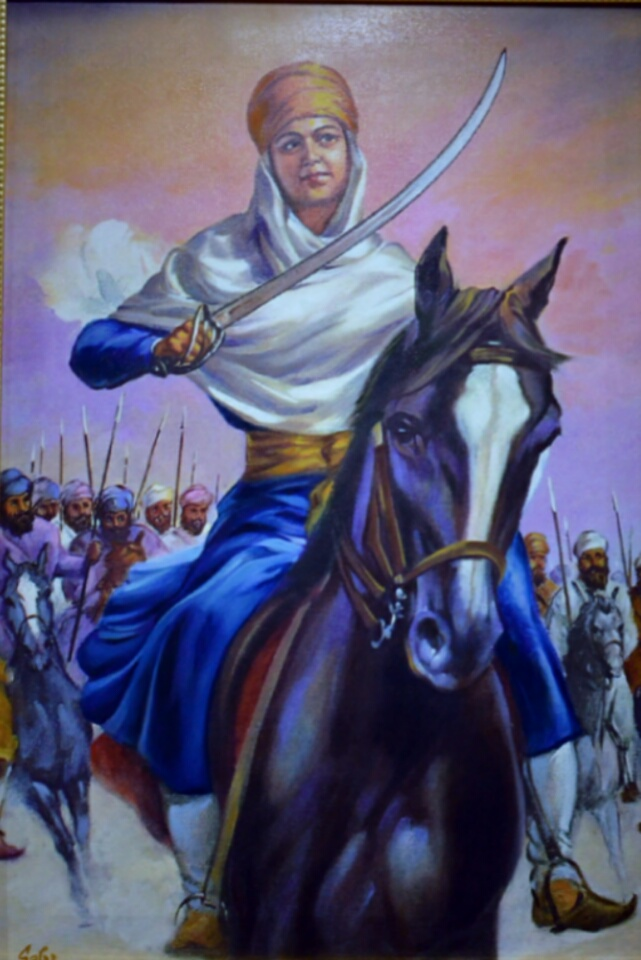
20th century painting of Mai Bhago

Mohan Singh, Jathedar of Hazur Sahib, in 1788 built a Bunga (fortified tower) in the memory of Mai Bhag Kaur. The weapons of Mai Bhago are kept in the Hazur Sahib Gurudwara complex at Abchalnagar Nanded, India.

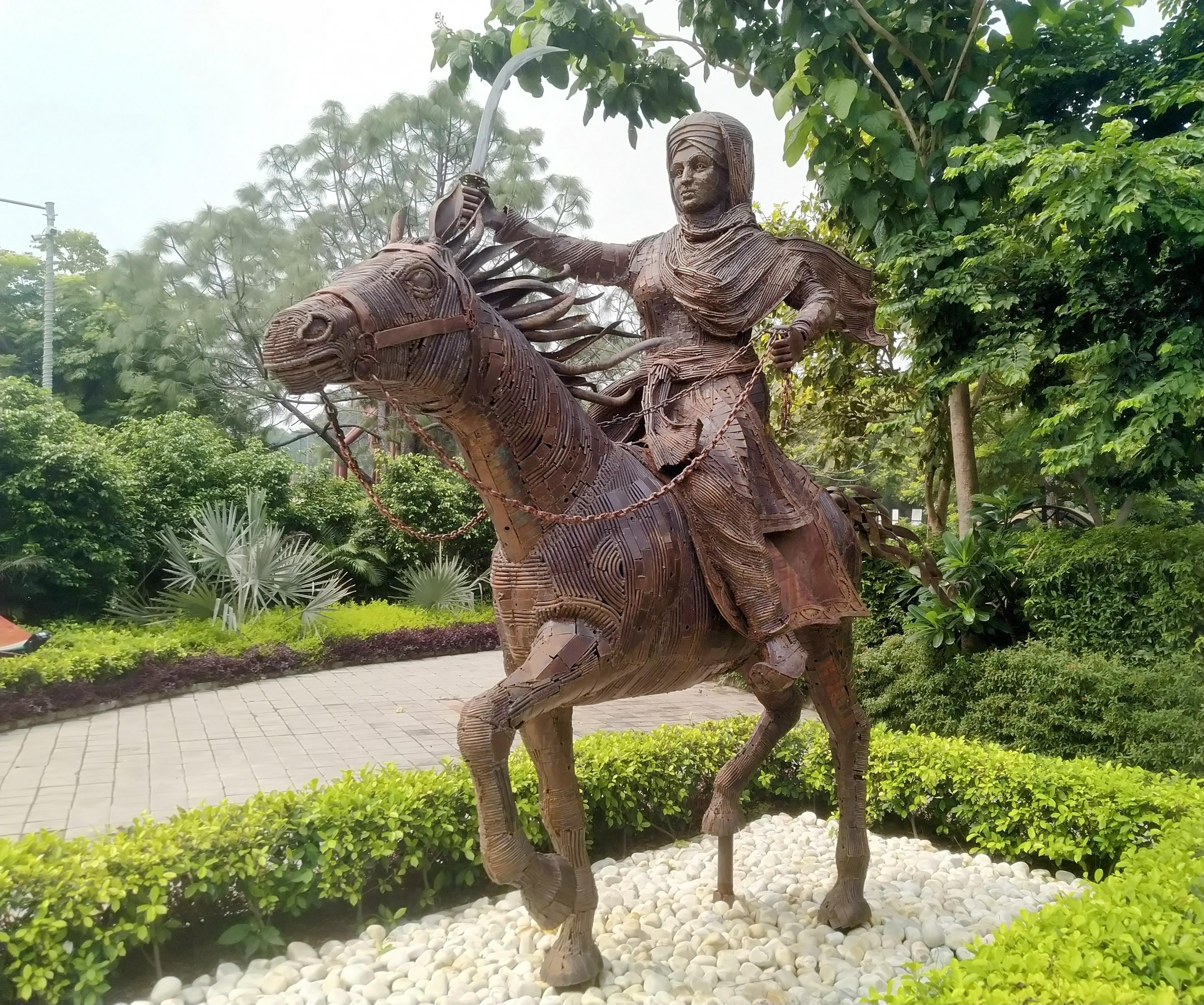
Statue of Mai Bhago in Shahidi park, New Delhi

Modern artwork of Mai Bhago often depict her wearing a turban in-battle. She has become the idealized woman for Sikh women.

== See also ==
- Women in Sikhism
