= Ökologisches Wirtschaften =

Academic journal

- Frequency: quarterly
- Publisher: oekom
- First issue: 1986
- Website: https://www.oekologisches-wirtschaften.de/
- ISSN: 1430-8800 (print); 2625-5421 (web)

Ökologisches Wirtschaften is an academic journal for socioeconomics and ecological economics.

The journal was introduced in 1986 by Institut für ökologische Wirtschaftsforschung (IÖW) and Vereinigung für ökologische Wirtschaftsforschung (VÖW). Since 1996 it has been published four times a year with a focus on a specific topic by Oekom-Verlag, Munich.

The journal relates new research approaches to practical experience in politics and business. Discussions of the conflict between economy, ecology and society, and new ideas for a future-oriented, sustainable economy are presented.

In the archive, all articles published since 1986 are available online.

== See also ==
- journal Ecological Economics
