= Shiromani Akali Dal (disambiguation) =

The Shiromani Akali Dal (SAD) is a political party in India.

Shiromani Akali Dal may also refer to:

== Political parties in Punjab ==
- Shiromani Akali Dal
- Shiromani Akali Dal (Amritsar), a splinter group of the Shiromani Akali Dal, formed in 1994.
- Akali Dal (Waris Punjab De), a political party formed by the supporters of Amritpal Singh, launched on 14 January 2025.
- Shiromani Akali Dal (Punar Surjit), a splinter group of the Shiromani Akali Dal, formed in 2025.
- Akali Dal (1920), formed by Ravi Inder Singh.

== Parties outside Punjab ==
- Shiromani Akali Dal Delhi, a splinter group which was formed in 1999 in Delhi.
- Haryana State Akali Dal, a splinter group which was formed in May 1999 in Haryana.

== Defunct parties ==
=== 1960s ===
- Akali Dal – Sant Fateh Singh Group, formed in 1962, merged back into Shiromani Akali Dal in 1968.
- Akali Dal – Master Tara Singh Group, formed in 1962, merged back into Shiromani Akali Dal in 1968.

=== 1980s ===
- Akali Dal – Jagdev Singh Talwandi Group, split in 1980, merged back into Shiromani Akali Dal in 1995.
- Akali Dal – Parkash Singh Badal Group, split in 1986, merged back into Shiromani Akali Dal in 1995.
- United Akali Dal, formed in 1985, merged into Shiromani Akali Dal (Amritsar) in 1994.

=== 1990s ===
- Shiromani Akali Dal (Panthic), split in 1991, merged with Indian National Congress in 1997.
- Akali Dal – Babbar Group, formed in 1992, merged into Shiromani Akali Dal (Amritsar) in 1994.
- Akali Dal – Kabul Singh Group, formed in 1992, merged into Shiromani Akali Dal (Amritsar) in 1994.
- Akali Dal – Manjit Singh Group, formed in 1992, merged into Shiromani Akali Dal (Amritsar) in 1994.
- Akali Dal – Sukhjinder Singh Group, formed in 1992, merged back into Shiromani Akali Dal in 1995.
- Shiromani Akali Dal (Democratic), formed in 1996, merged back into Shiromani Akali Dal in 2004.
- Sarb Hind Shiromani Akali Dal, split in 1999, merged back into Shiromani Akali Dal in 2003.

=== 2000s ===
- Shiromani Akali Dal (Longowal), split in 2004, merged back into Shiromani Akali Dal in 2007.

=== 2010s ===
- People's Party of Punjab, split in 2011, merged into Indian National Congress in 2016.
- Shiromani Akali Dal (Longowal), split again in 2014, merged into Indian National Congress.
- United Akali Dal, split again in 2014, merged into SAD (D) in 2020.
- Shiromani Akali Dal (Taksali), split in 2018, merged with Shiromani Akali Dal (Democratic) in 2021.

=== 2020s ===
- Shiromani Akali Dal (Democratic), re-established in 2020, merged with Shiromani Akali Dal (Taksali) in 2021.
- Shiromani Akali Dal (Sanyukt), formed in 2021 as merger of SAD (D) and SAD (T), merged back into SAD in 2024.
