= Badal ministry =

Badal ministry may refer to these cabinets headed by Indian politician Parkash Singh Badal as chief minister of Punjab:

- First Badal ministry (1970–1971)
- Second Badal ministry (1977–1980)
- Third Badal ministry (1997–2002)
- Fourth Badal ministry (2007–2012)
- Fifth Badal ministry (2012–2017)
