= Bir Devinder Singh =

Indian politician (1949/1950 – 2023)

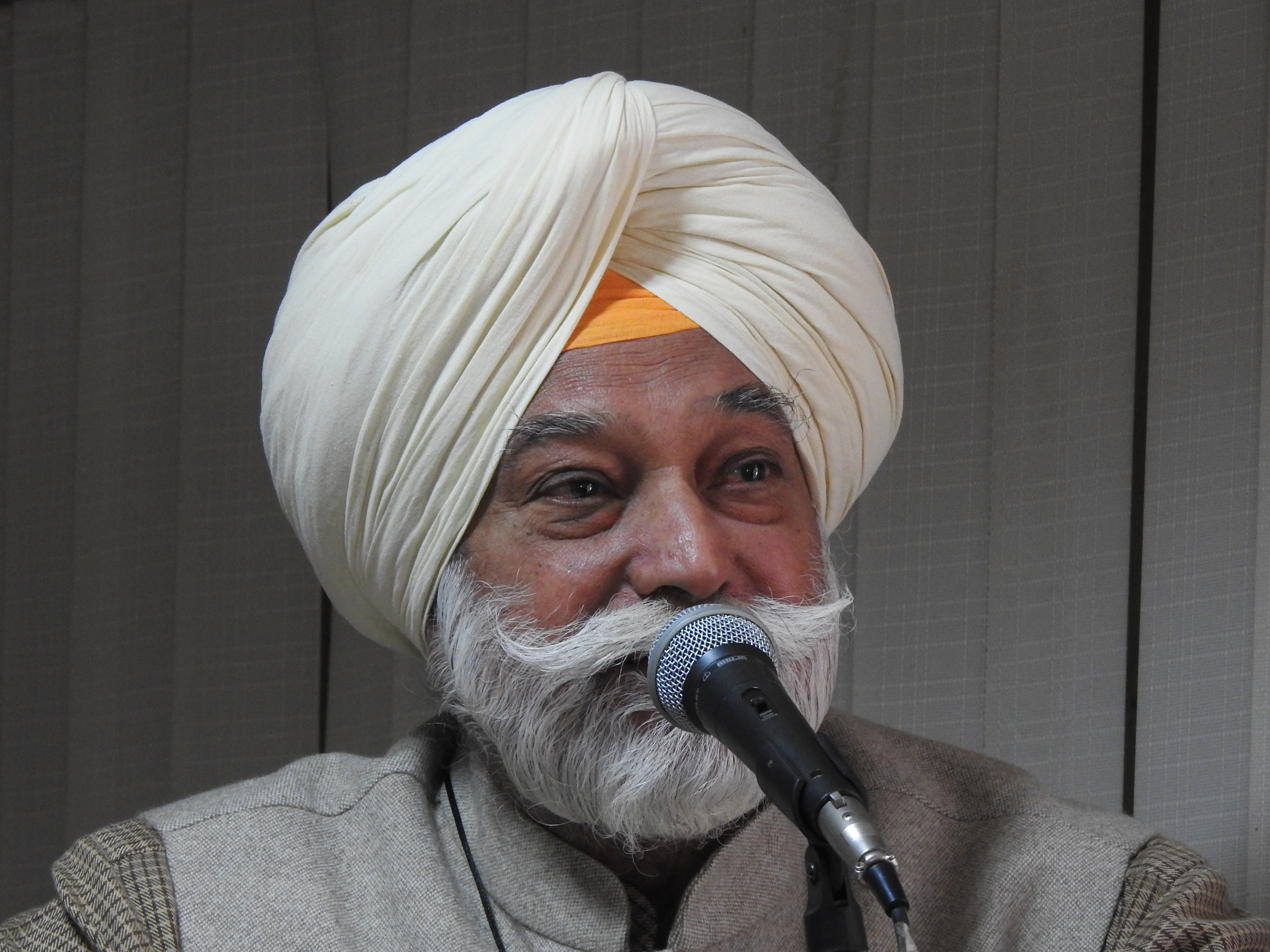

Deputy speaker of the Punjab Legislative Assembly
- In office 2003–2004

Personal details
- Born: 1948
- Died: 30 June 2023 (aged 73) Chandigarh, India
- Party: All India Sikh Students Federation (1971–1977) Indian National Congress (1978–1986, 1999–2008, 2014–2016); Shiromani Akali Dal (2008–2010); People's Party of Punjab (2010–2012); Shiromani Akali Dal (Taksali) (5 February 2019 – July 2020) Shiromani Akali Dal (Sanyukt) (July 2020 – December 2021)
- Occupation: Politician

Bir Devinder Singh (1949/1950 – 30 June 2023) was an Indian politician from the state of Punjab. He was the deputy speaker of the Punjab Legislative Assembly between 2003 and 2004.

== Politics ==
After graduating as a leader of All India Sikh Students Federation, Bir Devinder Singh was chosen by the Congress to fight election from Sirhind in 1980 which he won.

In 2002 on a Congress ticket he was made a Deputy Speaker.

B. D. Singh represented the Kharar assembly constituency from 2002 to 2007. He also represented Sirhind Constituency from 1980 to 1985. He was declared the best parliamentarian for the Legislative Assembly term from 2002 to 2007.

Singh was from the Indian National Congress. He was expelled from the party allegedly because he raised his voice against the corruption done by Congress Chief Capt Amarinder Singh.

Singh joined Shiromani Akali Dal (Taksali) on 5 February 2019.

== Death ==
Singh died from cancer on 30 June 2023, at the age of 73.
