= First Amarinder Singh ministry =

State government in Punjab, India, from 2002 to 2007

- Ministry of Punjab
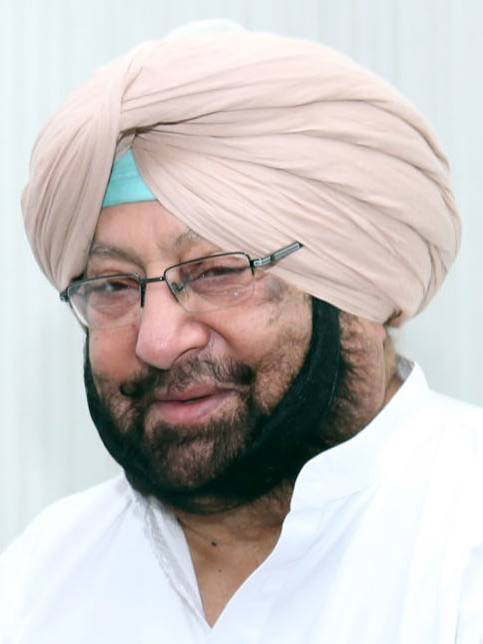
- Amarinder Singh; Chief Minister of Punjab
- Date formed: 27 February 2002
- Date dissolved: 1 March 2007

People and organisations
- Head of state: Governor J. F. R. Jacob
- Head of government: Amarinder Singh
- No. of ministers: 20
- Total no. of members: 20
- Member parties: INC
- Status in legislature: Majority government

History
- Election: 2002
- Outgoing election: 2002
- Legislature term: 5 years
- Predecessor: Second Badal ministry
- Successor: Fourth Badal ministry

The First Amarinder Singh ministry was the Council of Ministers headed by Amarinder Singh in the state of Punjab, India. It was formed after the victory of the Indian National Congress in the 2002 Punjab Legislative Assembly election. Amarinder Singh was sworn in as the Chief Minister of Punjab on 27 February 2002.

The ministry initially consisted of 13 Cabinet Ministers and six Ministers of State sworn in on March 5. In January 2004, after internal differences within the Punjab Congress, former Chief Minister Rajinder Kaur Bhattal was appointed as Deputy Chief Minister. Several changes were made to the Council of Ministers during the tenure of the government.

The ministry remained in office until the defeat of the Congress in the 2007 Punjab Legislative Assembly election, after which the Fourth Badal ministry headed by Parkash Singh Badal assumed office.

== Tenure ==
The Amarinder Singh government came to power promising administrative reforms, economic revival and action against corruption. The government focused on agricultural diversification, industrial revival and improving governance.

Soon after assuming office, the government replaced several senior bureaucrats appointed during the previous administration. Y. S. Ratra was appointed Chief Secretary and M. S. Bhullar was appointed Director General of Police.

The government also constituted committees on agriculture, finance and industrial revival. The S. S. Johl Committee was established to recommend reforms in Punjab agriculture and reduce dependence on the wheat-paddy cycle.

In January 2004, Rajinder Kaur Bhattal was appointed Deputy Chief Minister as part of efforts by the Congress high command to resolve factional disputes within the state unit.

== Council of Ministers ==
S.No	Name	Constituency	Department	Party
1.	Amarinder Singh; Chief Minister of Punjab		Home Affairs and Justice; Jails; Sports and Youth Services Welfare; General Administration; Civil Aviation; Vigilance; Power; Information and Public Relations; Agriculture; Defence Services Welfare; Removal of Grievances; Relief and Rehabilitation; Information Technology; Industries and Commerce; Environment; Other departments not allocated to any Minister	INC
Deputy Chief Minister
2.	Rajinder Kaur Bhattal; Deputy Chief Minister		Medical Education and Research; Higher Education; Languages; Technical Education	INC
Cabinet Ministers
3.	Lal Singh		Rural Development and Panchayats; Irrigation; Power	INC
4.	Raghunath Sahai Puri		Housing and Urban Development	INC
5.	Jagmohan Singh Kang		Animal Husbandry; Dairy Development; Tourism; Fisheries	INC
6.	Sardul Singh		Excise and Taxation; Printing and Stationery	INC
7.	Amarjit Singh Samra		Revenue; Rehabilitation; Relief and Resettlement; NRI Affairs	INC
8.	Mohinder Singh Kaypee		Transport	INC
9.	Avtar Henry		Food and Supplies; Public Health	INC
10.	Ramesh Chander Dogra		Health and Family Welfare	INC
11.	Partap Singh Bajwa		Public Works Department (B&R); Cultural Affairs; Archives and Museums	INC
12.	Harnam Dass Johar		School Education	INC
13.	Surinder Singla		Finance; Planning; Institutional Finance and Banking	INC
14.	Jagjit Singh		Local Government; Parliamentary Affairs; Elections	INC
15.	Jasjit Singh Randhawa		Cooperation; Horticulture	INC
Ministers of State
16.	Rakesh Pandey		Science and Technology; Industrial Training	INC
17.	Gurkanwal Kaur		Welfare of Scheduled Castes and Backward Classes; Social Security; Development of Women and Children	INC
18.	Hira Raj Josan		State Forests	INC

== Major decisions ==
=== Agricultural diversification committee ===
The government appointed agricultural economist S. S. Johl to head the Committee on Reorganising Agriculture and Diversification. The committee examined ways for Punjab to reduce its dependence on the wheat-paddy cycle and create links between agriculture and industry.

=== Industrial revival ===
A committee headed by former Chief Secretary Ajit Singh Chatha was established to examine the revival of industries in Punjab.

=== Administrative reforms ===
The government announced measures aimed at reducing corruption, including proposals requiring elected representatives to declare their assets.

== See also ==
- Government of Punjab, India
- Punjab Legislative Assembly
- Second Badal ministry
- Fourth Badal ministry

Political offices
Preceded by Second Badal ministry	Government of Punjab; 2002–2007	Succeeded by Fourth Badal ministry
