= Lambi Assembly constituency =

Legislative Assembly constituency in Punjab State, India

Coordinates: 30.06°N 74.61°E

Lambi
- Constituency No. 83 for the Punjab Legislative Assembly

Constituency details
- Country: India
- State: Punjab
- District: Sri Muktsar Sahib
- Lok Sabha constituency: Bathinda
- Total electors: 165,263
- Reservation: None

Member of Legislative Assembly
- 16th Punjab Legislative Assembly
- Incumbent Gurmeet Singh Khudian
- Party: Aam Aadmi Party
- Elected year: 2022

Lambi Assembly constituency (Sl. No.: 83) is a Punjab Legislative Assembly constituency in Sri Muktsar Sahib district, Punjab state, India. A voter-verified paper audit trail was used in Lambi in the 2017 Assembly polls. It is part of the Bathinda Lok Sabha constituency, which is represented by Harsimrat Kaur Badal. The total number of voters in this constituency is 155,556 and there are 168 polling stations.

Parkash Singh Badal has been a record four times chief minister of Punjab. He has won five consecutive times from Lambi constituency from 1997 to 2017.

== List of MLAs ==
Most successful parties from Lambi Vidhan Sabha
1. SAD (8 Times) (57.1%)
2. INC (3 Times) (21.4%)
3. CPI (2 Times) (14.3%)
4. AAP (1 Time) (7.14%)

Members of Punjab Legislative Assembly Lambi.

Year	Name	Portrait	Party
1962	Ujagar Singh		Indian National Congress
1967	S. Chand		Indian National Congress
1969	Dana Ram		Communist Party of India
1972	Dana Ram		Communist Party of India
1977	Gurdas Singh Badal		Shiromani Akali Dal
1980	Hardipinder Singh		Shiromani Akali Dal
1985	Hardipinder Singh		Shiromani Akali Dal
1987	President's Rule		Governor of Punjab
1992	Gurnam Singh Abulkhurana		Indian National Congress
1997	Parkash Singh Badal		Shiromani Akali Dal
2002	Parkash Singh Badal		Shiromani Akali Dal
2007	Parkash Singh Badal		Shiromani Akali Dal
2012	Parkash Singh Badal		Shiromani Akali Dal
2017	Parkash Singh Badal		Shiromani Akali Dal
2022	Gurmeet Singh Khudian		Aam Aadmi Party

== Election results ==
=== 2027 ===
Punjab Assembly election, 2027: Lambi
Party	Candidate	Votes	%	±%
AAP				
AD (WPD)				New entry
INC				
BSP				
SAD				
BJP				
NOTA	None of the above			
Majority				
Turnout				

=== 2022 ===
Punjab Assembly election, 2022: Lambi
Party	Candidate	Votes	%	±%
AAP	Gurmeet Singh Khuddian	66,313	48.87	▲32.88
SAD	Parkash Singh Badal	54,917	40.47	▼9.48
INC	Jagpal Singh Abul Khurana	10,136	7.47	▼32.81
SAD(A)	Jaswinder Singh	1,318	0.97	▲0.57
NOTA	None of the above	1,226	0.9	▲0.07
BJP	Rakesh Dhingra	1,116	0.82	New
Majority		11,396	8.4	▼8.74
Turnout		135,697		
Registered electors		165,825		
AAP gain from SAD		Swing		

=== 2017 ===
Punjab Assembly election, 2017: Lambi
Party	Candidate	Votes	%	±%
SAD	Parkash Singh Badal	66,375	49.54	−6.17
INC	Capt. Amarinder Singh	43,605	32.54	−2.9
AAP	Jarnail Singh	21,254	15.86	−
NOTA	None of the above	1,101	0.82	−
PLP	Gurmeet Singh Ranghreta	730	0.54	+0.25
Majority		22,770	17.00	−3.27
Turnout		1,34,089	85.77	−1.46
Registered electors				
SAD hold		Swing	-6.17	

=== 2012 ===
Punjab Assembly election, 2012: Lambi
Party	Candidate	Votes	%	±%
SAD	Parkash Singh Badal	67,999	55.71	
INC	Maheshinder Singh	43,260	35.44	
PPoP	Gurdas Singh Badal	5,352	4.38	
BSP	Parveen Kumari	1,773	1.45	
IND.	Puran Singh	1,239	1.02	
Majority		24,739	20.27	
Turnout		1,22,174	87.23	
SAD hold		Swing		

== See also ==
- Punjab Legislative Assembly
- List of constituencies of the Punjab Legislative Assembly
- Sri Muktsar Sahib district
