= Fifth Badal ministry =

Government of Punjab, India from 2012 to 2017

- Ministry of Punjab
- Parkash Singh Badal; Chief Minister of Punjab
- Date formed: 16 March 2012
- Date dissolved: 16 March 2017

People and organisations
- Head of government: Parkash Singh Badal
- No. of ministers: 17
- Member parties: SAD; BJP
- Status in legislature: Coalition government
- Opposition party: Indian National Congress

History
- Election: 2012
- Outgoing election: 2017
- Legislature term: 5 years
- Predecessor: Fourth Badal ministry
- Successor: Second Amarinder Singh ministry

The Fifth Badal ministry was the Council of Ministers headed by Parkash Singh Badal in the state of Punjab, India. It was formed after the victory of the alliance between the Shiromani Akali Dal and the Bharatiya Janata Party in the 2012 Punjab Legislative Assembly election. Parkash Singh Badal was sworn in as the Chief Minister of Punjab on 16 March 2012.

The ministry consisted of members from the Shiromani Akali Dal and the Bharatiya Janata Party. Sukhbir Singh Badal served as Deputy Chief Minister during the tenure of the government.

The ministry remained in office until the defeat of the SAD–BJP alliance in the 2017 Punjab Legislative Assembly election, after which the Second Amarinder Singh ministry assumed office.

== Tenure ==
The Fifth Badal ministry came to power after the SAD–BJP alliance won the 2012 Punjab Legislative Assembly election. Parkash Singh Badal became Chief Minister of Punjab for his fifth term.

The government continued the coalition arrangement between the Shiromani Akali Dal and the Bharatiya Janata Party. Sukhbir Singh Badal served as Deputy Chief Minister and held several important portfolios during the tenure of the ministry.

The ministry remained in office until 16 March 2017, when the Second Amarinder Singh ministry was formed following the 2017 Punjab Legislative Assembly election.

== Council of Ministers ==
S.No	Name	Constituency	Department	Party
1.	Parkash Singh Badal; Chief Minister of Punjab		Personnel; General Administration; Power; Cooperation; Science, Technology and Environment; Vigilance; Employment Generation; Other departments not allocated to any Minister	SAD
Deputy Chief Minister
2.	Sukhbir Singh Badal; Deputy Chief Minister		Home Affairs and Justice; Governance Reforms; Excise and Taxation; Welfare; Civil Aviation; Housing and Urban Development; Investment Promotion; Sports and Youth Services	SAD
3.	Bikram Singh Majithia		Revenue	SAD
4.	Parminder Singh Dhindsa		Finance	SAD
5.	Bhagat Chunni Lal		Local Government; Health	BJP
6.	Madan Mohan Mittal		Parliamentary Affairs	BJP
7.	Surjit Kumar		Forest and Wildlife	BJP
8.	Sikander Singh Maluka		Higher Education and Languages; School Education	SAD
9.	Daljit Singh Cheema		Education	SAD
10.	Sarwan Singh Phillaur		Tourism	SAD
11.	Adesh Partap Singh Kairon		Information Technology; Taxation	SAD
12.	Ajit Singh Kohar		Transport	SAD
13.	Gulzar Singh Ranike		Dairy	SAD
14.	Tota Singh		Agriculture	SAD
15.	Jagir Kaur		Social Welfare; Development of Women and Children Welfare	SAD
16.	Surjit Singh Rakhra		Water Supply	SAD
17.	Sharanjit Singh Dhillon		Irrigation	SAD

== Major decisions ==
=== Coalition government ===
The Fifth Badal ministry continued the coalition government of the Shiromani Akali Dal and the Bharatiya Janata Party after winning the 2012 Punjab Legislative Assembly election.

=== Administrative changes ===
During its tenure, the government introduced administrative measures and continued policies of the previous SAD–BJP government.

== See also ==
- Government of Punjab, India
- Punjab Legislative Assembly
- Fourth Badal ministry
- Second Amarinder Singh ministry

Political offices
Preceded by Fourth Badal ministry	Government of Punjab; 2012–2017	Succeeded by Second Amarinder Singh ministry
