= 2015 Guru Granth Sahib desecration controversy =

The 2015 Guru Granth Sahib desecration (also known as the 2015 Sri Guru Granth Sahib sacrilege) refers to a series of desecration incidents of the Sikh Guru Guru Granth Sahib and subsequent protests that took place in Punjab, India in October 2015, although it is known as the 2015 Guru Granth Sahib desecration it started from 2014 and continued until 2021. The first incident of desecration was reported from Bargari, Faridkot district, where 110 torn Angs (pages) of the holy Book were found on 12 October. On the early morning of 14 October, two Sikhs were protesting and were shot dead by the police.

== Events ==
=== Initial events ===
On the afternoon of 1 June 2015, the Guru Granth Sahib, the Sikh holy scripture, was taken from a gurdwara in a village called Burj Jawahar Singh Wala in Faridkot district, Punjab. On 5 June, several Sikh leaders, including Baljit Singh Daduwal, gave an ultimatum to the police to find the culprits. On 11 June, members of various Sikh religious organisations held a protest in the village accusing the police of inaction. They tried to gherao (surround) the local police station. A large police unit was deployed to prevent it and 17 Sikhs were critically injured and taken to a nearby hospital due to 'Lathi Charges' from the police.

On the morning of 12 October 2015, more than 110 Angs of the Guru Granth Sahib were found lying on the ground in front of a gurdwara in Bargari, Faridkot district. The residents of the town and nearby villages declared a bandh. The members of some Sikh religious organisation arrived in the town and in the evening a protest march carrying the torn Angs was held. In nearby Kotkapura, protestors blocked a major highway intersection. Large numbers of police personnel were deployed to prevent violence. The protestors refused to unblock the highways, despite requests from the local police chiefs, demanding that the perpetrators to be arrested.

=== Other incidents and protests ===
Between 13 and 16 October 2015, several more incidents of desecration were reported from various places in Punjab. 35 Angs of the Guru Granth Sahib were found torn in Mishriwala village of Ferozepur district. When a member of the Shiromani Gurdwara Parbandhak Committee (SGPC) went to the village to get details, his car was vandalised by the Dalit-Majhabi-Sikh villagers. When he tried to escape on a motorcycle, the villagers also set fire to the motorcycle. 39 Angs of the Gur Granth Sahib were found torn in Bath village in Tarn Taran district. Two days later, a protester in the village died of a cardiac arrest during a protest march. In Kohrian village in Faridkot, a 3-inch cut was found 745 Angs of the Guru Granth Sahib. The villagers filed a complaint and decided against escalating the issue. In Sarai Naga village in Muktsar district, Angs of a copy of the Panj Granth, a smaller text containing selected verses from the Guru Granth Sahib, were found torn. In Gadani in Nawanshahr, three Saroops were found burnt. The police managed to keep peace in the region. In Kotli Ablu village in Muktsar, a gurdwara caught fire and its Bir of the Guru Granth Sahib were burnt to ashes. In Kohrian village of Sangrur district, some Angs of Guru Granth Sahib were reported torn.

On 13 October 2015, in Buttar Kalan village in Moga district, protesters clashed with the police. Seven policemen were injured, among them, one received spinal injuries. On 14 October 2015, around 6000 protesters gathered in Kotkapura and held a peaceful sit-in protest to demand action. In the early morning hours, the police started using water cannons and lathi charge to scatter the crowd. They fired some rounds at the mob. Two protesters died in the firing. More than 160 protesters were critically injured in clashes, and 21 policemen were also injured. The Inspector General of Bhatinda, Jatinder Jain, was among those injured. The Senior Superintendent of Police of Faridkot, S. S. Mann, said that some of the protestors were armed with sharp weapons and told the government to put a ban on the Sikh Kirpan. The protesters also destroyed 10 vehicles of which 5 belonged to the police.

On 15 October 2015, the Punjab government announced the formation of a Judicial Commission headed retired Punjab and Haryana High Court judge Zora Singh to investigate the first incident of desecration.

On 16 October 2015, the Deputy Chief Minister of Punjab Sukhbir Singh Badal ordered the withdrawal of charges against the arrested protesters. He said that they were provoked to act in that manner. He also announced a reward of ₹1 crore for any information about the culprits. Also on 16 October, in face of the protests, the Akal Takht revoked the pardon given to Gurmeet Ram Rahim Singh, the leader of Dera Sacha Sauda, on 24 September 2015. He had been accused of blasphemy by appearing before a congregation while dressed as Guru Gobind Singh in 2007. Later, the police ruled out the role of Dera Sacha Sauda followers in the incidents saying that all 22 Dera Sacha Sauda followers were mentally unstable.

The protests spread over the Malwa region in Punjab. On 18 October 2015, the protesters blocked one location in every district from morning to afternoon. The protesters were seen carrying black flags, placards, swords and sticks.

By October 2021 there have been 272 Guru Granth Sahib desecration cases and 12 arrests.

=== Arrests ===
On 19 October 2015, Jagdeep Singh, 30, a gurdwara granthi (priest) was arrested from Nijjapura village in Amritsar district. He had called the police and told them that three men had entered their gurdwara at night and tore pages of the holy book. However, on interrogation he admitted to lying. Also on 19 October, a woman Balwinder Kaur, 53, was arrested for alleged desecration of the holy book in Ghawaddi, Ludhiana. She had allegedly entered the gurdwara early in the morning and desecrated pages of Guru Granth Sahib. She had served in the gurdwara for two decades. Balwinder later admitted to tearing the pages. Sikandar Singh, a sevadar (servitor), was charged with destroying evidence.

On 20 October 2015, 10 companies of the central paramilitary forces were deployed across four districts. Also on 20 October, in Gurusar Mehraj of Bathinda district another desecration of the holy book was reported. On the same day, in Nagoke of Tarn Taran district a man was caught by the village attempting to commit desecration of the holy book. He was beaten up and handed over to three members of the Satkar Committee, a vigilante group, and the man later identified as one Malkit Singh, 34, could not be traced by the police. The same day Deputy Chief Minister Sukhbir Singh Badal announced that the World Kabaddi Cup that was to be held in Punjab in November has been cancelled. A series of arrests took place on 20 October. A granthi (priest) Jagdish Singh and his wife Lakhwinder Kaur were arrested from Nijjarpura village in Jandiala for damaging gutkas and pothis.

Also on 20 October 2015, the police said that they arrested two brothers, Rupinder Singh and Jaswinder Singh, of Panjgarayin village in Fardikot for their suspected role in the original desecration in Bargari. The police also said that they had telephone transcripts to prove that they had received funding and instructions from their foreign handlers in Australia and Dubai. However, on 22 October, the two callers came forth with their explanations. The caller from Melbourne, Australia, Sukhjit Singh, said that he had sent A$150 (about ₹7,400) meant for the people injured in the clashes with the police. Hardip Singh Khalsa, who was a truck driver in Dubai, said that he and some other Sikhs in Dubai had collected ₹100,000 for 4 people injured in the clashes. ₹25,000 of the sum was meant for Rupinder Singh.

On 25 October, two more pages of Guru Granth Sahib were found desecrated in Ghurial, Adampur. The villagers accused a 50-year-old priest Avtar Singh Tari, and his nephew Ajit Singh of the crime and trashed them. They were rescued and arrested by the police. Also on 25 October, Suresh Arora was appointed the new Director General of Police (DGP) replacing Sumedh Singh Saini.

On 1 November, the case was handed over to the Central Bureau of Investigation (CBI). The Deputy Chief Minister said that the two brothers, Rupinder Singh and Jaswinder Singh, had refused to undergo a polygraph test. Various Sikh groups demanded their release.

On 2 November 2015, the two brothers, Rupinder Singh and Jaswinder Singh, were released from the police custody. They claimed that were tortured by the police to force them to admit to their crime. They said that they actually arrested on 17 October morning, but their arrest was reported only on 20 October. The police denied torturing them.

=== Reactions ===
==== Political reactions ====
Also on 18 October, Amarinder Singh of Indian National Congress (INC) political party demanded the resignation of Chief Minister Prakash Singh Badal and imposition of President's rule in Punjab. On 18 October 2015, Ramanjit Singh Sikki, an MLA belonging to INC, resigned in protest. Around this time, various politicians resigned from the ruling-party Shiromani Akali Dal (SAD). They included Mangat Rai Bansal, Rajinder Singh Sidhu, and Jathedar Sukhdev Singh Bhaur. Various members of the Shiromani Gurdwara Parbandhak Committee (SGPC) also submitted their resignations in protest, accusing the government of failing to protect the holy books.

==== Sikh diaspora ====
On 19 October 2015, about 1000 Canadian Sikhs held a candlelight vigil in British Columbia to mark their protest against the desecrations and the police action in Punjab. Canadian Minister Rob Nicholson said that the media blackout and police action against peaceful protestors was appalling. Some symbols of the separatist Khalistan movement were displayed at the meeting.

On 22 October 2015, a group of Sikh protesters gathered in front of the Indian High Commission in central London to protest the events in Punjab. A small group of protesters turned to violence and a policeman was injured. About 20 protesters were arrested and charged with affray. In the US, several Sikh organisation, including American Sikh Council (ASC), North American Punjabi Association (NAPA) and Indian National Overseas Congress (INOC), condemned the desecration and killing of the protesters. They urged the central and state governments to bring the culprits to justice.

== Aftermath ==
On 20 November 2015, the Punjab Cabinet approved an amendment to the Section 295A of the Indian Penal Code. The new Section 295AA carried a maximum sentence of life in prison for sacrilege of Guru Granth Sahib. The bill was passed on 22 March 2016.
