= Second Amarinder Singh ministry =

State government in Punjab, India, from 2017 to 2021

- Ministry of Punjab
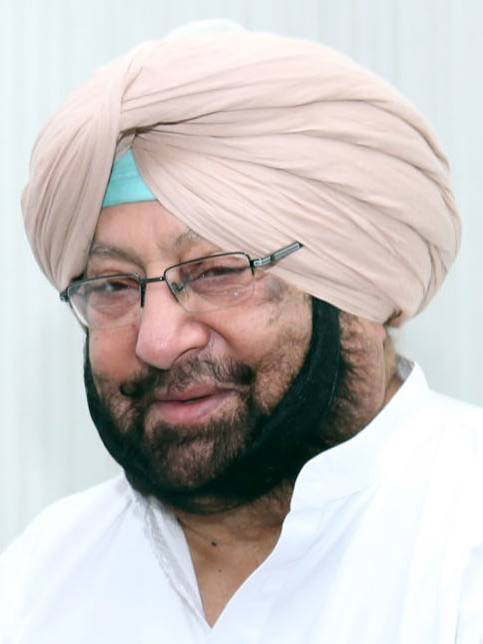
- Amarinder Singh; Hon'ble Chief Minister of Punjab
- Date formed: 16 March 2017
- Date dissolved: 18 September 2021

People and organisations
- Head of state: Governor V. P. Singh Badnore
- Head of government: Amarinder Singh
- No. of ministers: 18
- Ministers removed: 1
- Total no. of members: 17
- Member parties: INC
- Status in legislature: 2/3rd Majority

History
- Election: 2017
- Outgoing election: 2017
- Legislature term: 5 years
- Predecessor: Parkash Singh Badal Ministry (2012-2017)
- Successor: Channi ministry

Captain Amarinder Singh's second cabinet started from March 2017. Amarinder Singh is the leader of INC was sworn in the Chief Ministers of Punjab on 16 March 2017. His ministry had 17 Cabinet ministers including the Chief Minister as well as two women. The following is the list of ministers with their portfolios in the Government of Punjab.

Captain Amarinder Singh resigned from the post of Chief Ministers of Punjab after claiming that he felt humiliated three times by the Congress leadership in the past two months.

== Tenure ==
In June 2021, MLA and deputy leader of the opposition in Punjab assembly, Saravjit Kaur Manuke held hunger strike along with AAP activists to protest against the inaction of the Punjab government in the payment of post-matric scholarship amount of Dalit students. AAP convener Bhagwant Mann said that the protest by AAP members had forced the Punjab government then led by CM Amarinder Singh to release the funds amounting to 200 crore as 40% share of the amount that Punjab government had to pay.

== Council of Ministers ==
S.No	Name	Constituency	Department	Party
1.	Amarinder Singh; Chief Minister	Patiala Urban	Administrative Reforms.; Agriculture and Farmers’ Welfare.; Horticulture.; Conservation of Land and Water.; Civil Aviation.; Defence Services Welfare.; Excise & Taxation.; General Administration.; Home Affairs & Justice.; Hospitality.; Investment Promotion.; Information & Public Relations.; Legal & Legislative Affairs.; Personnel.; Environment.; Vigilance.; Wildlife.; Science & Technology.; Government Reforms.; Information Technology.; Power.; New and Renewable Energy Sources.; Other departments not allocated to any Minister.	INC
Cabinet Ministers
2.	Brahm Mohindra	Patiala Rural	Local Government.; Parliamentary Affairs.; Elections.; Removal of Grievances.	INC
3.	Manpreet Singh Badal	Bathinda Urban	Finance.; Planning.; Programme Implementation.	INC
4.	Om Parkash Soni	Amritsar Central	Medical Education & Research.; Freedom Fighters; Food Processing.	INC
5.	Sadhu Singh Dharamsot	Nabha	Forests.; Printing and Stationery.; Welfare of SCs and BCs.	INC
6.	Tripat Rajinder Singh Bajwa	Fatehgarh Churian	Rural Development.; Panchayats.; Animal Husbandry.; Fisheries and Dairy Development.; Higher Education.	INC
7.	Rana Gurmit Singh Sodhi	Guru Har Sahai	Sports & Youth Affairs.; NRI Affairs.	INC
8.	Charanjit Singh Channi	Chamkaur Sahib	Technical Education & Industrial Training.; Employment Generation.; Tourism and Cultural Affairs.	INC
9.	Aruna Chaudhary	Dinanagar	Social Security.; Women & Child Development.	INC
10.	Razia Sultana	Malerkotla	Water Supply & Sanitation (Public Health).; Transport.	INC
11.	Sukhjinder Singh Randhawa	Dera Baba Nanak	Cooperation.; Jails.	INC
12.	Sukhbinder Singh Sarkaria	Raja Sansi	Water Resources.; Mines & Geology.; Housing and Urban Development.	INC
13.	Gurpreet Singh Kangar	Rampura Phul	Revenue.; Rehabilitation.; Disaster Management.	INC
14.	Balbir Singh Sidhu	S.A.S. Nagar	Health and Family Welfare.; Labour.	INC
15.	Vijay Inder Singla	Sangrur	Public Works Department.; School Education.	INC
16.	Sunder Sham Arora	Hoshiarpur	Industries.; Commerce.	INC
17.	Bharat Bhushan Ashu	Ludhiana West	Food & Civil Supplies.; Consumer Affairs.	INC

=== Former Ministers ===
S.No	Name	Constituency	Department	Party
1.	Navjot Singh Sidhu	Amritsar East	Local Government.; Tourism & Cultural Affairs.	INC

== Major decisions ==
=== Reducing the number of the post of Patwari ===
On 5 December 2019, the Council of Ministers in the Amarinder Singh government took a decision to reduce the number of posts of patwari in the revenue department from 4,716 to 3,660. The decision was not publicly disclosed.

== See also ==
- Government of Punjab, India
- Punjab Legislative Assembly
- Charanjit Singh Channi ministry

Political offices
Preceded by Fifth Badal ministry	Government of Punjab; 2017–2021	Succeeded by Channi ministry
