= Fourth Badal ministry =

- Ministry of Punjab

- Parkash Singh Badal; Chief Minister of Punjab
- Date established: 1 March 2007
- Date dissolved: 14 March 2012

Leadership and composition
- Head of government: Parkash Singh Badal
- Member parties: SAD; BJP
- Status in legislature: Majority coalition government

Formation and history
- Election: 2007
- Outgoing election: 2007
- Legislature term: 5 years
- Predecessor: First Amarinder Singh ministry
- Successor: Fifth Badal ministry

The Fourth Badal ministry was the Council of Ministers headed by Parkash Singh Badal in the state of Punjab, India. It was formed after the victory of the alliance between the Shiromani Akali Dal and the Bharatiya Janata Party in the 2007 Punjab Legislative Assembly election. Parkash Singh Badal was sworn in as the Chief Minister of Punjab on 1 March 2007.

The ministry consisted of members from the Shiromani Akali Dal and the Bharatiya Janata Party. In 2009, Sukhbir Singh Badal was appointed as Deputy Chief Minister.

The ministry remained in office until the completion of its term in 2012, after which the Fifth Badal ministry headed by Parkash Singh Badal assumed office.

== Tenure ==
The Fourth Badal ministry came to power after the SAD–BJP alliance won the 2007 Punjab Legislative Assembly election. Parkash Singh Badal returned as Chief Minister of Punjab for his fourth term.

The government was a coalition administration consisting of ministers from both alliance partners. During the tenure of the ministry, Sukhbir Singh Badal was appointed Deputy Chief Minister in 2009.

The ministry continued in office until 14 March 2012, when the Fifth Badal ministry assumed office after the 2012 Punjab Legislative Assembly election.

== Council of Ministers ==
S.No	Name	Constituency	Department	Party
1.	Parkash Singh Badal; Chief Minister of Punjab		Chief Minister; Other departments not allocated to any Minister	SAD
Deputy Chief Minister
2.	Sukhbir Singh Badal; Deputy Chief Minister		Deputy Chief Minister	SAD
Cabinet Ministers
3.	Parminder Singh Dhindsa		Public Works Department	SAD
4.	Bikram Singh Majithia		Science and Technology	SAD
5.	Ajit Singh Kohar		Revenue and Rehabilitation	SAD
6.	Gulzar Singh Ranike		Sports and Youth Services	SAD
7.	Bhagat Chunni Lal		Local Government; Health	BJP
8.	Sucha Singh Langah		Agriculture	SAD

== Major decisions ==
=== Coalition administration ===
The Fourth Badal ministry was formed as a coalition government between the Shiromani Akali Dal and the Bharatiya Janata Party following the 2007 Punjab Legislative Assembly election.

=== Appointment of Deputy Chief Minister ===
In 2009, Sukhbir Singh Badal was appointed Deputy Chief Minister during the tenure of the government.

== See also ==
- Government of Punjab, India
- Punjab Legislative Assembly
- First Amarinder Singh ministry
- Fifth Badal ministry

Political offices
Preceded by First Amarinder Singh ministry	Government of Punjab; 2007–2012	Succeeded by Fifth Badal ministry
