= Third Badal ministry =

State cabinet ministry

The following is the list of ministers of the Third Badal ministry with their portfolios in the Government of Punjab.

== Council of Ministers ==
Portfolio	Minister	Took office	Left office	Party	Ref
Chief Minister; Other departments not allocated to any Minister	Parkash Singh Badal	12 February 1997	26 February 2002	SAD	
Education	Tota Singh	12 February 1997	26 February 2002	SAD	
Irrigation; Power	Sikandar Singh Maluka	12 February 1997	26 February 2002	SAD	
-	Madan Mohan Mittal	12 February 1997	26 February 2002	SAD	
-	Sarwan Singh Phillaur	12 February 1997	26 February 2002	SAD	

Political offices
Preceded by	Government of Punjab; 1997–2002	Succeeded by First Amarinder Singh ministry
