= Second Badal ministry =

Government of Punjab, India from 1977 to 1980

- Ministry of Punjab, India
- no
- Date formed: 23 June 1977
- Date dissolved: 17 February 1980

People and organisations
- Chief Minister: Parkash Singh Badal
- No. of ministers: 8
- Member parties: SAD

The Second Badal ministry was the Council of Ministers in Punjab, India, headed by Parkash Singh Badal as Chief Minister. Badal was sworn in as chief minister on 23 June 1977. His ministry was dismissed on 17 February 1980.

== Council of Ministers ==
Name	Office	Portfolio	Took office	Left office	Party
Parkash Singh Badal	Chief Minister	Other departments not allocated to any minister	23 June 1977	17 February 1980	SAD
Sardar Atma Singh	Cabinet Minister	Development	23 June 1977	17 February 1980	SAD
Balwinder Singh Bhunder	Cabinet Minister	Agriculture; Forest; Soil Conservation	23 June 1977	17 February 1980	SAD
Balwant Singh Thind	Cabinet Minister	Finance	23 June 1977	17 February 1980	SAD
Jaswinder Singh Brar	Cabinet Minister	Cooperation	23 June 1977	17 February 1980	SAD
Jiwan Singh Umranangal	Cabinet Minister	Revenue	23 June 1977	17 February 1980	SAD
Sukhdev Singh Dhindsa	Minister of State	Transport; Sports; Tourism; Cultural Affairs; Civil Aviation	23 June 1977	17 February 1980	SAD
Dalip Singh Talwandi	Minister of State		23 June 1977	17 February 1980	SAD
