= Gurnam Singh Abulkhurana =

Indian politician (1931–2021)

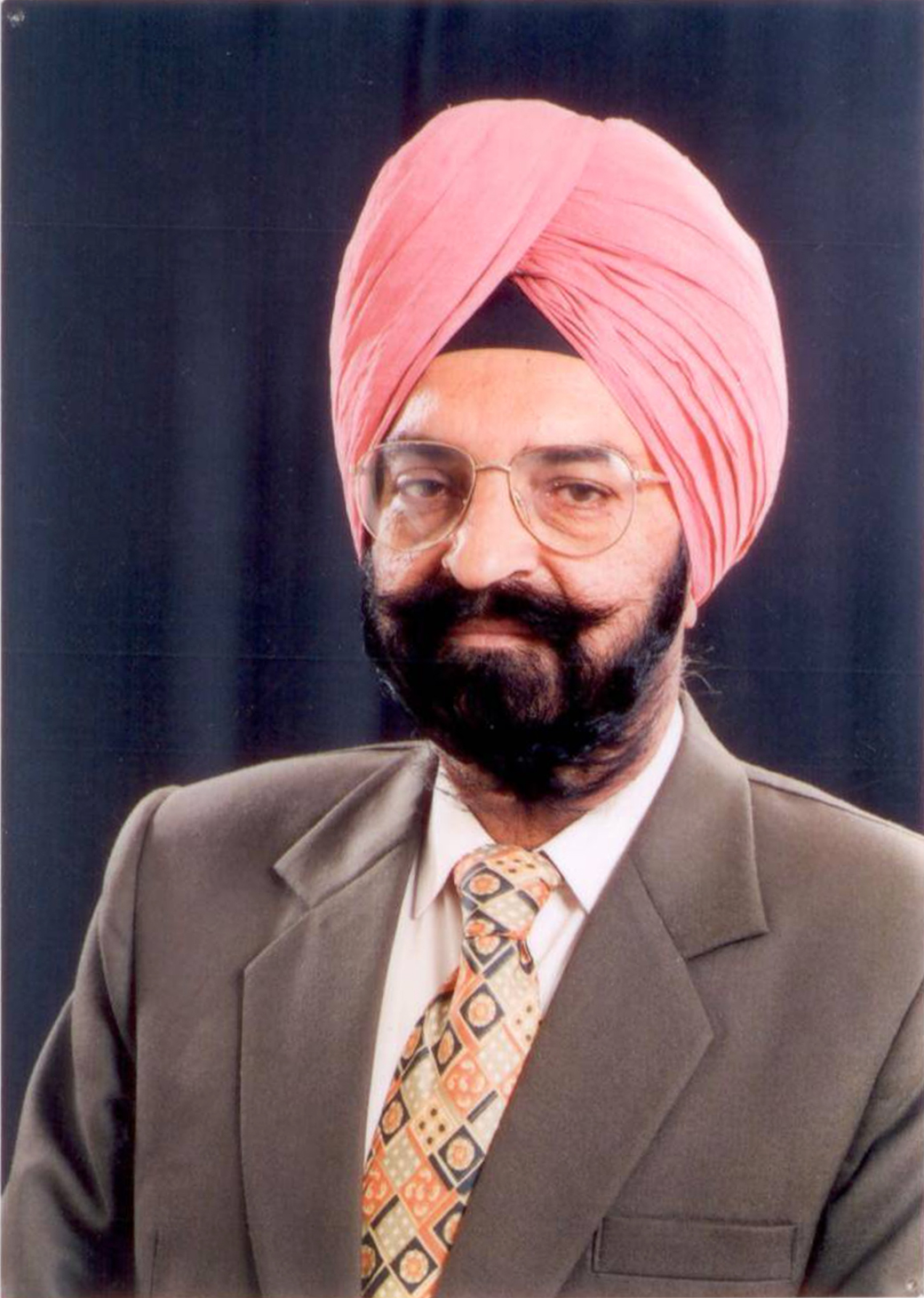
- Gurnam Singh Abulkhurana, Year 1999.

State Minister, Punjab
- In office 1992–1997

MLA, Punjab
- In office 1992–1997
- Preceded by: President's Rule
- Succeeded by: Parkash Singh Badal
- Constituency: Lambi

Personal details
- Born: 16 April 1931
- Died: 23 March 2021 (aged 89) Chandigarh, India
- Party: INC

Gurnam Singh Abulkhurana (16 April 1931 – 23 March 2021) was an Indian politician and was a member of the Legislative Assembly representing Lambi in Punjab.

He was a Minister of Irrigation and Revenue in Government of Punjab from 1992–1997. He has three sons and a daughter. His son Jagpal Singh Abulkhurana is a congress party general secretary.

Abulkhurana died on 23 March 2021 in Chandigarh, India.
