= Des Raj Dhugga =

Indian politician

MLA, Punjab
- In office 2002 - 2012
- Preceded by: Sohan Singh
- Succeeded by: Constituency underwent Boundary delimitation
- Constituency: Garhdiwala
- In office 2012 - 2017
- Preceded by: Balbir Singh Bath
- Succeeded by: Balwinder Singh Laddi
- Constituency: Sri Hargobindpur

Personal details
- Born: 30 May 1964 (age 61) Dhugga Kalan Village, Hoshiarpur
- Party: Shiromani Akali Dal (till 2021); Shiromani Akali Dal (Sanyukt) (2021-till now)
- Spouse: Smt. Kuljit Kaur
- Children: One Son
- Parent(s): Sh. Bhulla Ram and Smt. Karm Kaur
- Website: http://www.punjabassembly.nic.in/index.php/members/detail/13

Des Raj Dhugga is an Indian politician and belongs to the ruling Shiromani Akali Dal. He was a member of Punjab Legislative Assembly and represented Sri Hargobindpur.

== Family ==
His father's name is Bhulla Ram.

== Political career ==
Dhugga first became a member of Punjab Legislative Assembly on the Congress ticket from Garhdiwala in 2002, which was reserved for candidates belonging to scheduled castes. He retained his seat in the 2007 Vidhan Sabha elections. In 2012 Garhdiwala underwent Boundary delimitation and Sri Hargobindpur was converted from general category seat to a reserve category seat. Dhugga successfully contested from Sri Hargobindpur in 2012. He was made chief parliamentary secretary in 2007 Badal government. He continued on this position after the 2012 Punjab elections and was given the department of Animal Husbandry and Fisheries.

In 2021 he joined the Shiromani Akali Dal (Sanyukt) and then became the President of its SC wing.
