= Akali Dal – Jagdev Singh Talwandi Group =

- President: Jagdev Singh Talwandi
- Founded: 1980
- Dissolved: 1995
- Split from: Shiromani Akali Dal
- Merged into: Shiromani Akali Dal
- Ideology: Sikhism
- Colours: Orange

Akali Dal – Jagdev Singh Talwandi Group was a Sikh-centric political party and faction that was created after a split in the Shiromani Akali Dal.

== History ==
The separate faction was first founded by Jagdev Singh Talwandi, former president of Shiromani Akali Dal, after a power struggle with Parkash Singh Badal in 1980. It temporarily merged into the United Akali Dal faction in 1985, but the attempts at broader Akali unification failed, resulting in the continuation of the Talwandi faction. Jagdev Singh Talwandi’s faction was a signatory of the 1994 Amritsar Declaration, which attempted to unite all Akali factions behind a common platform. The party merged into the mainstream Shiromani Akali Dal in 1995, along with most Akali factions apart from Shiromani Akali Dal (Simranjit Singh Mann). Shiromani Akali Dal formed a strong government under the leadership of Parkash Singh Badal, and Jagdev Singh Talwandi was chosen as the Jathedar of Shiromani Gurdwara Parbandhak Committee in 2000.
