= Shiromani Akali Dal Delhi =

Splinter group of the Shiromani Akali Dal, India

Shiromani Akali Dal Delhi is a splinter group of the Shiromani Akali Dal. SADD emerged as a separate party on 22 February 1999 when a section of the Delhi unit of the Badal-led SAD revolted against the suspension of Ranjit Singh as the Akal Takht jathedar. SADD sided with Gurcharan Singh Tohra on this issue.. The convener of the new party was Avtar Singh Autopins. SADD president is Paramjit Singh Sarna and general secretary is S. Balbir Singh (Vivek Vihar).

In the 2002 Delhi Sikh Gurudwara Management Committee elections SADD contested with the support of Tohra and his Sarb Hind Shiromani Akali Dal. When re-approachment took place between Tohra and Badal, SADD distanced itself from Tohra and aligned more closely with the Indian National Congress.

In the 2003 DSGMC elections SADD contested supported by Congress. SADD won the elections that year.
