= Sarb Hind Shiromani Akali Dal =

- Leader: Gurcharan Singh Tohra
- Founded: May 30, 1999
- Dissolved: 2003

The Sarb Hind Shiromani Akali Dal (SHSAD) was a Sikh political party in India, formed after a split in the Shiromani Akali Dal. The party was led by Gurcharan Singh Tohra.

SHSAD was founded by Tohra after he was expelled by the SAD Political Affairs Committee on May 14, 1999. SHSAD was officially constituted on May 30, 1999. The party contested the 1999 Lok Sabha election and won 4.15% of the vote in Punjab. All in all the party had fielded 7 candidates in Punjab.

SHSAD contested the 2002 Punjab Vidhan Sabha election as a constituent of the Panthic Morcha, an alliance of Sikh parties.

Tohra reconciled with SAD in 2003. A unity declaration between Tohra and the SAD leader Parkash Singh Badal was signed in Patiala on June 13, 2003. Whilst SHSAD had been unsuccessful in winning seats in elections, the SAD-SHSAD split influenced elections by dividing the Akali vote and enabling the Indian National Congress to win elections in Punjab. After the merger of SHSAD and SAD, SAD emerged victorious in the 2004 Lok Sabha election in Punjab.

== See also ==
- Splinter groups of the Akali Dal
