= Akali Dal – Parkash Singh Badal Group =

- President: Parkash Singh Badal
- Founded: 1986
- Dissolved: 1995
- Split from: Shiromani Akali Dal
- Merged into: Shiromani Akali Dal
- Ideology: Sikhism
- Colours: Navy Blue

Akali Dal – Parkash Singh Badal Group was a Sikh-centric political faction that was created after a major split in the Shiromani Akali Dal.

== History ==
The separate faction was established as a protest move against Chief Minister of Punjab Surjit Singh Barnala, who approved Operation Black Thunder in 1986, which removed Sikh militants from the Golden Temple. This operation was highly disproved of by the public, due to which 27 Shiromani Akali Dal MLAs led by Parkash Singh Badal and Captain Amarinder Singh split from the mainstream party and a separate group. It temporarily merged into the United Akali Dal faction in 1987 as per orders of the Akal Takht, but the attempts at broader Akali unification failed, resulting in the continuation of the Badal faction. Parkash Singh Badal’s faction was famously one of the only factions to not be a signatory of the 1994 Amritsar Declaration, which attempted to unite all Akali factions behind a common platform. The party merged into the mainstream Shiromani Akali Dal in 1995, after Parkash Singh Badal consolidated control over the party and became President, leading to the formation of a strong government in 1997.
