= Sardar Atma Singh =

Indian politician

Sardar Atma Singh (born 28 January 1912, date of death unknown) was an Indian politician of the Shiromani Akali Dal party and the former Development Minister of Punjab, India.

== Early life ==
Sardar Atma Singh was born in the village of Sheikwala in the district of Sheikpura on 28 January 1912. He was one of six children born to Sardar Thanda Singh and Bibi Pal kaur. Although he had only graduated from high school, he was able to attain the title of Gyani. (A Gyani or Giani is an honorific Sikh title given to people learned in the Sikh religion and who often lead congregations in prayers, such as Ardas, or in singing (kirtan)). He married Bibi Tej kaur and had two daughters.

== Political career ==
Atma Singh was a former Cabinet Minister in Punjab and a prominent veteran Akali Dal Leader, as well as a social and religious group activist. He contested elections in 1952 and 1954 for Pepsu Assembly and for Punjab Vidhan SaBha nine times and won seven times from 1952 onwards to 1985. He was declared best Parliamentarian of Punjab Vidhan SaBha. He had won the election in 1954 while he was in jail.

The constituency in Punjab Vidha Sasha which was flood-ravaged. He was instrumental in getting Dhussi Bandh (embankment) to construct alongside River Ber to protect the area from floods. He also undertook the overall development of the region and facilitated widespread prosperity, infrastructure, and development. He made a major contribution in the field of education by establishing two schools: Nandbana Sahib Public High School and Sri Guru Harkrishan Senior Secondary Public School in the Sultanpur Lodhi in his early fifties. He was also founding President of Guru Nanak Khalsa College at Sultanpur Lodhi, which was established in 1969 the education (Bandra) Bombay in 1937 in close collaboration with Dr. Bhimrao Ramji Ambedkar, the architect of the Indian Constitution. He regarded education and skill formation the most effective tools for the upliftment and empowerment of the downtrodden and the disadvantaged.
