= Lambi, Punjab =

Lambi
- Village
- Location in Punjab, India Lambi (India)
- Coordinates: 30°03′25″N 74°36′28″E
- Country: India
- State: Punjab
- District: Sri Muktsar Sahib

Population (2011)
  - Total: 5,053

Languages
  - Official: Punjabi
- Time zone: UTC+5:30 (IST)
- PIN: 152113

Lambi is a Panchayat village in Malout tehsil of Sri Muktsar Sahib district in the state of Punjab, India.

Ex Chief Minister of Punjab Parkash Singh Badal has record five consecutive wins from 1997 to 2017 contesting from Lambi Assembly Constituency.

== Geography ==
Lambi is located between Malout and Mandi Dabwali on National Highway No. 9 in Punjab State.

== Demographics ==
As per 2011 Census of India Lambi had a total population of 5,053 of which 2,602 (53%) were males and 2,451 (47%) were females. Population below 6 years was 563. The literacy rate was 62.14% of the population over 6 years. The sex ratio was 942 females per thousand males.

== Transportation ==
=== Road ===
Lambi is well connected by road network by virtue of being located on NH 9.

=== Railway ===
Nearest railway stations to Lambi are Gidderbaha railway station, Malout railway station and Mandi Dabwali (Hry) railway station.

== Postal services ==
Lambi post office is a Sub Office of Indian Postal Service. The Pin code of Lambi village is 152113.
