= United Akali Dal =

- President: Baba Joginder Singh (1989), Bhai Mokham Singh (2014)
- Secretary: Gurdeep Singh Bathinda
- Founded: 1985–(1st time); 2014–(2nd time)
- Dissolved: 1994–(1st time); 25 June 2020-(2nd time)
- Preceded by: United Sikh Movement, Insaf Lehar
- Succeeded by: Shiromani Akali Dal (Amritsar)-(1st time); Shiromani Akali Dal (Democratic)-(2nd time)
- Headquarters: Amritsar
- Youth wing: Youth United Akali Dal
- Ideology: Sikhism
- Colours: Orange

United Akali Dal was a Sikh-centric political party that was re-established on 22 November 2014 at Amritsar by leaders of United Sikh Movement and Insaf Lehar have played leading role in setting up this party. It originally was a major Akali-faction in the 1980s run by Baba Joginder Singh and Simranjit Singh Mann.

== First existence ==
United Akali Dal was founded by Baba Joginder Singh, the father of Jarnail Singh Bhindranwale, and Simranjit Singh Mann, in 1985. Akali Dal – Jagdev Singh Talwandi Group and Akali Dal – Parkash Singh Badal Group had temporarily merged into United Akali Dal in 1987 under the orders of the Akal Takht. Captain Amarinder Singh was also involved in this merger. However, failures in unity resulted with these factions once again splitting into separate entities. The party was commonly understood as the "Akali Dal (Mann)" faction, and contested the 1989 Indian general election and won most seats in Punjab. It was after this election that Simranjit Singh Mann was released from prison. The party merged into Shiromani Akali Dal (Amritsar) after its establishment in 1994.

== Second existence ==
On 22 November 2014, the United Akali Dal was re-established at Amritsar. Bhai Mokham Singh of Damdami Taksal was the leader of this restored party. On 25 June 2020, Bhai Mokham Singh and his party members dissolved the party and merged into the new Shiromani Akali Dal (Democratic), led by Sukhdev Singh Dhindsa.
