= Gurdas Singh Badal =

Indian politician and parliamentarian (1931–2020)

Gurdas Singh Badal (6 August 1931 – 15 May 2020) was an Indian politician and parliamentarian. He was born in Abul Khurana, Firozpur district. He was the younger brother of Parkash Singh Badal. He was elected to the seventh Lok Sabha from Fazilka constituency in 1967 as member of Shiromani Akali Dal. He was a member of the Indian National Congress.

== Family ==
He was the son of late Raghuraj Singh Badal, and the younger brother of former Chief Minister of Punjab, Parkash Singh Badal. His son Manpreet Singh Badal was the Finance Minister of Punjab. His wife Harmandar Kaur died in March 2020.

== Political career ==
He was member of the Punjab Legislative Assembly from March 1967 – April 1969. He was elected to the 5th Lok Sabha from 15 March 1971 – 18 January 1977 from Fazilka constituency representing the Shiromani Akali Dal.

Later in his life he sported a green turban and supported the Indian National Congress.

He handled Badal’s entire election campaign in the family’s pocket borough of Lambi in Muktsar district. For people of Malwa, the region of Punjab that has traditionally been the Akali stronghold, Gurdas was Akali Dal and Akali Dal was Gurdas. It is often said that he was the man behind the Badal’s rise from village sarpanch to the chief minister of Punjab.

He was known to be the wind under his brother's wings and his election manager. Parkash Singh Badal had reared Gurdas Singh Badal's son to politics and both their children were able to become famous politicians. Even after a schism occurred between the Sukhbir Singh Badal and Manpreet Singh Badal, which the former won, their relationship did not deteriorate and remained.

== Death ==
He died from cardiac arrest on 15 May 2020 at Fortis Hospital in Mohali. He was cremated with state honors.
