= Labh Singh Saini =

Labh Singh Saini (1895–1947), known as Babu Labh Singh, Akali politician and notable freedom fighter, was born in 1895 and was the son of Lahiran. He spent his early youth at Quetta and passed his Matriculation examination from the high school there. In 1914, he took up service in the army as a clerk. For this reason, he was sometimes also known as Babu Labh Singh. He resigned his job as a protest against the killing of Sikhs at Nankana Sahib on 20 February 1921, and joined the campaign for the reform of Gurdwara management.

== Freedom-fighter ==
He was arrested in 1922 in connection with the Guru ka Bagh agitation. On 18 April 1924, he courted arrest at Jaito and was detained in Nabha jail. He was released along with other Akali prisoners after the passage in 1925 of the Sikh Gurdwaras Act. In 1926, he was elected president of the district unit of the Jalandhar Akali Jatha. In 1928, he participated in a protest march against the Simon Commission, and in 1930 he, along with a batch of 100 Sikh volunteers from his district, participated in the Civil Disobedience movement launched by the Indian National Congress. He was taken into custody in Delhi, but was released after the Gandhi–Irwin Pact was signed in 1931. He was arrested under the Defence of India Rules during the Quit India Movement. He organized from 25 to 27 November 1944 at Jandiala, in Jalandhar district, a massive Sikh conference to celebrate the silver jubilee of the Shiromani Akali Dal. In 1945, he was elected president of the Shiromani Akali Dal which office he held until his death on 9 March 1947 at Jalandhar.

== Akali Dal president ==
As the leader of the Shiromani Akali Dal, Labh Singh, condemned Indian communists for their role in the partition and passionately advocated for the Prisoners of War (POW) status for Azad Hind Fauj (Indian National Army) captives

He was stabbed along with Narinder Nath Khanna, N.F 169, quilla Mohalla Jalandhar by a Muslim fanatic while leading a peace march after communal disturbances in the town. The Civil Hospital and a Gurudwara in Rainak Bazar at Jalandhar commemorate his memory.

== See also ==
- Sikhism
- Dewan Chand Saini
