= Shiromani Akali Dal (Panthic) =

Shiromani Akali Dal (Panthik)
- Founder: Captain Amarinder Singh
- Founded: 1991
- Dissolved: 1997
- Split from: Shiromani Akali Dal
- Merged into: Indian National Congress

Shiromani Akali Dal (Panthic) was a defunct Indian political party in Punjab.It is one of several hard-line splinter group, formed as a result of the split in Shiromani Akali Dal in 1991. SAD(P) was formed in 1990. It is led by Jasbir Singh Rode. The party was a Sikh-centered political party in the Indian state of Punjab.

In January 1992 SAD (Panthik) merged with the Shiromani Akali Dal (Longowal). Amarinder however felt marginalized, and in February 1997 the SAD (Panthik) was re-launched. On 12 September 1997 SAD (Panthik) merged with the Indian National Congress and Amarinder Singh became the president of Punjab Pradesh Congress Committee (PCC) replacing Rajinder Kaur Bhattal.
