= Ranjit Singh Brahmpura =

Indian politician (1937–2022)

Member of Parliament, Lok Sabha
- In office 1 September 2014 – 23 May 2019
- Preceded by: Rattan Singh Ajnala
- Succeeded by: Jasbir Singh Gill
- Constituency: Khadoor Sahib

Cabinet Minister, Government of Punjab
- In office 1997–2002
- In office 2007–2012

Member of the Punjab Legislative Assembly
- In office 1977–1980
- Preceded by: constituency established
- Succeeded by: Surinder Singh Kairon
- Constituency: Naushehra Pannuan
- In office 1997–2012
- Preceded by: Harbhajan Singh
- Succeeded by: constituency went under delimitition
- Constituency: Naushehra Pannuan

Personal details
- Born: 8 November 1937 Colony of Singapore
- Died: 13 December 2022 (aged 85) Chandigarh, India
- Party: Shiromani Akali Dal (until 2018) (2021–2022)
- Other political affiliations: Shiromani Akali Dal (Taksali) (until 2021); Shiromani Akali Dal (Sanyukt) (2021)
- Spouse: Late Smt. Manjit Kaur
- Children: 4, Hardeep Singh BRAHMPURA, Kuldeep Kaur, Paramdeep Kaur Bhullar, Kawaljeet Kaur Bhullar
- Occupation: Agriculturist
- As of 3 July, 2019

Ranjit Singh Brahmpura (8 November 1937 – 13 December 2022) was an Indian politician who was a Member of Parliament, Lok Sabha for Khadoor Sahib constituency, he won the 2014 Indian general election being a Shiromani Akali Dal candidate. He is often referred to as Majhe Da Jarnail (meaning General of Majha in Punjabi). He has previously served as Cabinet Minister in Government of Punjab twice, and MLA four times in Punjab. He was a part of the Shiromani Akali Dal led by Sukhbir Singh Badal until 2019 when he left the party, fighting injustice and for what he believed was right. On 23 December 2021, he rejoined Shiromani Akali Dal.

Party political offices
Preceded by Rattan Singh Ajnala	Leader of the Shiromani Akali Dal Party in the 16th Lok Sabha; 2014–2018	Incumbent
