= Akali Dal (1920) =

Shiromani Akali Dal (1920) ਸ਼੍ਰੋਮਣੀ ਅਕਾਲੀ ਦਲ (1920)
- President: Ravinder Singh
- Secretary: Jathedar Boota Singh Ranshihnke
- Headquarters: 296, Sector 10-A, Chandigarh
- Ideology: Sikhism
- ECI status: Recognised State Party

Website
- Official Page

The Shiromani Akali Dal (1920) is a political party in India led by former Speaker of Punjab Vidhan Sabha, Ravi Inder Singh. It was formed under the twin leadership of Master Tara Singh and Sardar Kharak Singh.

== See also ==
- Splinter groups of the Akali Dal
