= Madan Mohan Mittal =

Indian politician

MLA, Punjab
- In office 1992 - 2002
- Constituency: Nangal
- In office 2012 -2017
- Constituency: Anandpur Sahib

Minister for Industry & Commerce, Technical Education & Industrial Training
- In office 2012 – 2017
- Chief Minister: Parkash Singh Badal

Minister for Health & Family Welfare
- In office 2012 – 2017
- Chief Minister: Parkash Singh Badal

Minister for Parliamentary Affairs
- In office 2012 – 2017
- Chief Minister: Parkash Singh Badal

Personal details
- Born: 17 March 1939 (age 87) Ghanaur Distt. Patiala
- Party: Shiromani Akali Dal SAD
- Spouse: Sneh Mittal
- Children: Vivek Mittal, Arvind Mittal,

Madan Mohan Mittal is an Indian lawyer, politician, and a leader of Shiromani Akali Dal Badal in Punjab. He served as the Minister for Parliamentary Affairs, Health & Family Welfare and Social Security & Development of Women & Children in the government headed by Parkash Singh Badal. Punjab Government. He is a member of SAD . He had done a lot of welfare work of his constituency Anandpur Sahib. He laid the foundation of a famous flyover project near nangal.He is a Senior Leader Shiromani Akali Dal in Punjab

== Political career ==
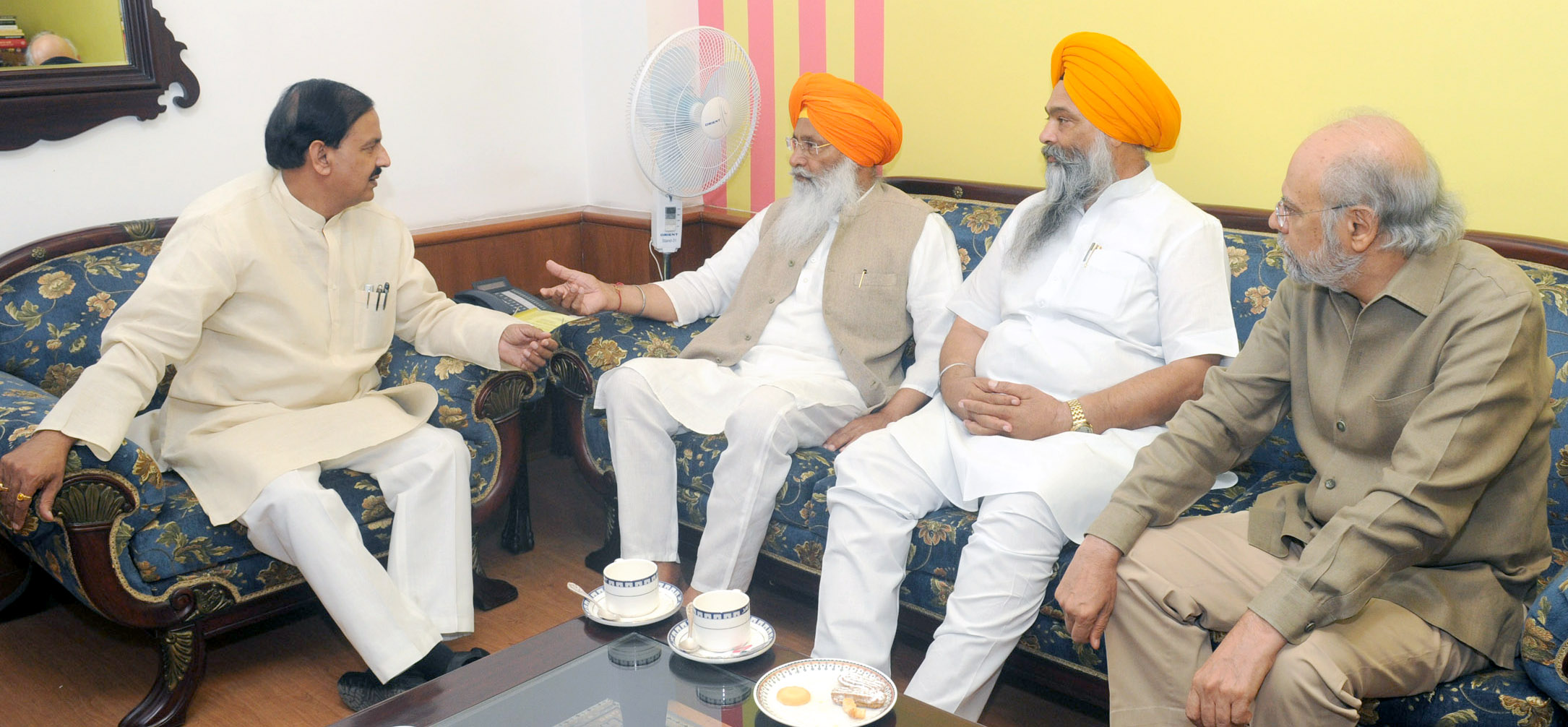
The Minister for Industries of Punjab, Shri Madan Mohan Mittal meeting the Minister of State for Culture (Independent Charge), Tourism (Independent Charge) and Civil Aviation, Dr. Mahesh Sharma, in New Delhi on June 01, 2015.

He successfully contented election from Nangal in 1977 and 1992 as a BJP candidate. In 1997, he was re-elected from Nangal. In 2012, and he successfully contested from Anandpur Sahib. He was a cabinet minister holding the portfolio of Parliamentary Affairs, Health & Family Welfare, and Social Security & Development of Women & Children. he is now in Shiromani Akali dal
