= Sukhdev Singh Dhindsa =

Indian politician (1936–2025)

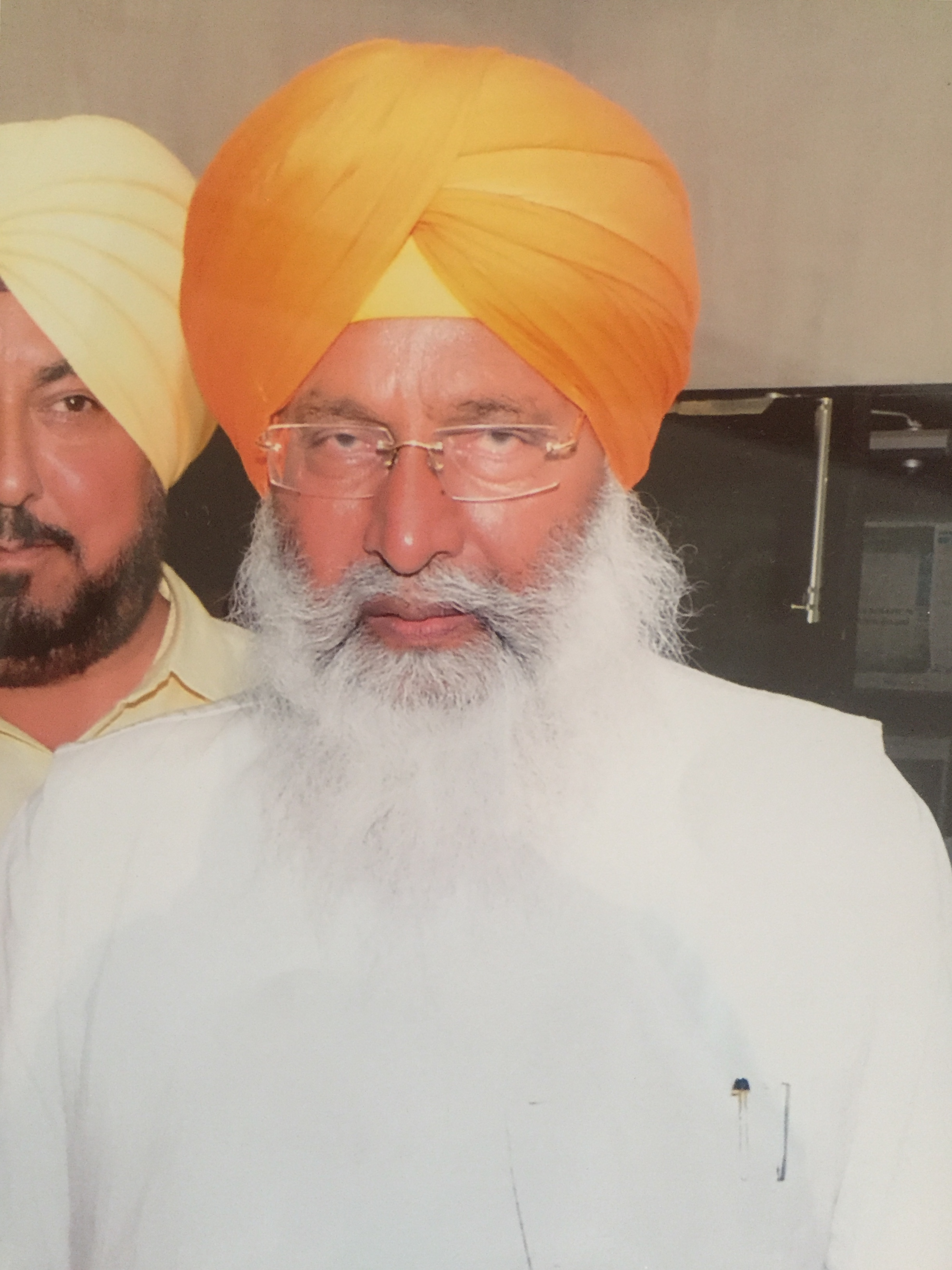
- Dhindsa in 2018

Member of Parliament, Rajya Sabha
- In office 9 April 2010 – 9 April 2022
- Succeeded by: Harbhajan Singh
- Constituency: Punjab

Member of Parliament, Lok Sabha
- In office 13 May 2004 — 16 May 2009
- Preceded by: Simranjit Singh Mann
- Succeeded by: Vijay Inder Singla
- Constituency: Sangrur

Personal details
- Born: 9 April 1936 Ubhawal, Sangrur district, Punjab Province, British India
- Died: 28 May 2025 (aged 89) Mohali, Punjab, India
- Party: Shiromani Akali Dal (Sanyukt)
- Other political affiliations: Shiromani Akali Dal (until 2021)
- Spouse: Harjit Kaur
- Children: 1 son and 2 daughters, including Parminder Singh Dhindsa
- Awards: Padma Bhushan (2019)

Sukhdev Singh Dhindsa (9 April 1936 – 28 May 2025) was an Indian politician who was a member of the Rajya Sabha. He was a onetime President of Shiromani Akali Dal (Sanyukt), which was formed by the merger of Shiromani Akali Dal (Democratic) and Shiromani Akali Dal (Taksali) led by him and Ranjit Singh Brahampura respectively. He returned to the Shiromani Akali Dal political party by merging his party back into it in March 2024. He had previously been a member of 14th Lok Sabha of India, representing the Sangrur constituency of Punjab. He was awarded the Padma Bhushan in the awards list of 26 January 2019. However, he returned it in December 2020 during the farmer protests.

President Ram Nath Kovind presenting the Padma Bhushan Award to Sukhdev Singh Dhindsa, at the Civil Investiture Ceremony-I, at Rashtrapati Bhavan, in New Delhi on 11 March 2019.

Dhindsa was union minister of sports and chemicals and fertilisers in the Third Vajpayee Ministry from 2000 to 2004. He was member of the Rajya Sabha from 1998 to 2004. His son Parminder Singh Dhindsa was finance minister of Punjab from 2012 till 2017.

== Political career ==
Dhindsa started his political journey as an active student leader during his graduation years at Govt. Ranbir College Sangrur. He was the first elected Secretary of Ranbir College Students' Council and subsequently elected as the president of council too. After graduating he was elected as the Sarpanch (youngest in whole district) of his native village Ubhawal in Sangrur district. Amongst the elected Sarpanches he became the chairman of Block Samiti Sangrur. Later he was elected as managing director of District Cooperative Bank, Sangrur. In 1972 Dhindsa won Dhanaula Assembly Constituency seat as an independent candidate and later joined Shiromani Akali Dal under the guidance and motivation of Sant Harchand Singh Longowal. He again was elected as an MLA from Sunam on the Shiromani Akali Dal ticket and inducted as Minister of State (Independent Charge) holding the portfolios of Transport, Sports, Tourism, Cultural Affairs and Civil Aviation. In 1980 he again was re-elected to the Punjab Vidhan Sabha from Sangrur seat. In 1985 he became MLA from Sunam. Later in 1986, differences brewed in Surjit Singh Barnala's Government on the issue of Operation Black Thunder, and Dhindsa chose to go with the faction of Parkash Singh Badal in retaliation to Operation Black Thunder.

== Death ==
Dhindsa died on 28 May 2025, at the age of 89.

Lok Sabha
Preceded by Simranjit Singh Mann	Member of Parliament for Sangrur; 2004 – 2009	Succeeded by Vijay Inder Singla
