= Shiromani Akali Dal (Sanyukt) =

Defunct political party in India

- Abbreviation: SAD(S)
- President: Sukhdev Singh Dhindsa
- General Secretary: Karnail Singh Peer Mohammed and Manmohan Singh Sathiala
- Spokesperson: Anish
- Rajya Sabha Leader: Sukhdev Singh Dhindsa
- Founder: Ranjit Singh Brahmpura, Sukhdev Singh Dhindsa
- Founded: 17 May 2021 (5 years, 88 days ago)
- Dissolved: 5 March 2024
- Merger of: Shiromani Akali Dal (Democratic) and Shiromani Akali Dal (Taksali)
- Merged into: Shiromani Akali Dal
- Women's wing: Shiromani Akali Dal (Sanyukt) Istri wing
- Ideology: Sikh interests
- Political position: Center-right
- Colours: Orange
- ECI status: Registered
- Alliance: National Democratic Alliance (2022-2024)

Election symbol
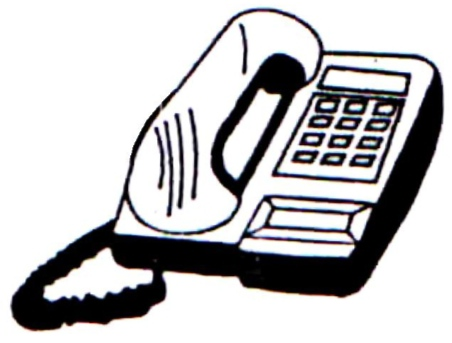

The Shiromani Akali Dal (Sanyukt) (lit. 'Supreme Akali Party (United)', SAD(S)) was a centre-right Sikh-centric political party in Punjab, India, formed by former Shiromani Akali Dal leaders Sukhdev Singh Dhindsa and Ranjit Singh Brahmpura.

The party was formed in April 2021 by the merger of two political parties of Punjab Shiromani Akali Dal (Taksali) and Shiromani Akali Dal (Democratic). Notable leaders included Ranjit Singh Talwandi, Harsukhinder Singh Bubby Badal, Manmohan Singh Sathiala, Parminder Singh Dhindsa, Paramjit Kaur Gulshan, Harjit Kaur Talwandi and Des Raj Dhugga.

== Overview ==
Shiromani Akali Dal (Sanyukt) was formed with the merger of Shiromani Akali Dal (Democratic) formed by Sukhdev Singh Dhindsa in 2020 and Shiromani Akali Dal (Taksali) by Ranjit Singh Brahmpura in 2018. Both formed their faction parties after they left the Shiromani Akali Dal (Badal). The party contested 2022 Punjab Legislative Assembly election with BJP and PLC in Punjab.

On 22 June 2021 Party made its first expansion by announcing Paramjit Kaur Gulshan as Patron and Harjit Kaur Talwandi as President of Women's wing and Des Raj Singh Dhugga as President of its Schedule Caste's wing and party also named 24 Districts Presidents.

== List of President ==
S. No	Name	Portrait	Tenure		
1	Sukhdev Singh Dhindsa		17 May 2021	5 March 2024	5 years, 89 days

== See also ==
- 2022 Punjab Legislative Assembly election
