= Shiromani Akali Dal (Democratic) =

- Abbreviation: SAD(D)
- Leader: Sukhdev Singh Dhindsa
- Founder: Kuldip Singh Wadala (1996), Sukhdev Singh Dhindsa (2020)
- Founded: 1996–(1st time); 2020–(2nd time)
- Dissolved: 2004-(1st time); 19 April 2021-(2nd time)
- Split from: Shiromani Akali Dal
- Merged into: Shiromani Akali Dal (Taksali)
- Succeeded by: Shiromani Akali Dal (Sanyukt)
- Ideology: Sikhism, Akali Dal
- Colours: Orange
- Alliance: None

Shiromani Akali Dal (Democratic), was splinter group of the Badal-led Shiromani Akali Dal. SAD(D) was formed in 1996 under the leadership of Kuldip Singh Wadala who would become the first president of the party. The party for a couple of years allied with various political parties across India that had similar platforms to challenge governments on certain issues. Ahead of the 2004 Lok Sabha elections, SAD(D) had re-merged with the Badal-led Shiromani Akali Dal again.

The party was re-established in 2020 under the same name and banner and under the leadership of Sukhdev Singh Dhindsa and his son Parminder Singh Dhindsa. Dhindsa and many workers and leaders of the Shiromani Akali Dal and Shiromani Akali Dal (Taksali) came together and re established the party, blaming the Badals and other leaders that are close to them for ruining the image of the Shiromani Akali Dal and saying that they have forgotten the Akali values. Dhindsa says that his faction of the Akali Dal is true Akali Dal that will uphold the Akali values that the Badals have forgotten. He also mentioned how the Badals ruined the chances of the Akali Dal regaining power, he said that this party will recover the Party, Movement, and Punjab. Ever since formation, this party has been gaining popularity, many smaller parties in Punjab and political families have joined this party. In mid May 2021, Shiromani Akali Dal (Democratic) and Shiromani Akali Dal (Taksali) both merged to form Shiromani Akali Dal (Sanyukt). This party no longer is existing.
