= Shiromani Akali Dal (Taksali) =

- Abbreviation: SAD(T)
- Leader: Ranjit Singh Brahmpura
- Founder: Ranjit Singh Brahmpura, Rattan Singh Ajnala, Sewa Singh Sekhwan, and Manmohan Singh Sathiala
- Founded: 16 December 2018
- Dissolved: 19 April 2021
- Split from: Shiromani Akali Dal
- Merged into: Shiromani Akali Dal (Democratic)
- Succeeded by: Shiromani Akali Dal (Sanyukt)
- Youth wing: President: Harsukhinder Singh Bubby Badal
- Ideology: Sikhism
- Colours: Navy Blue
- Alliance: PDA (2018-2019); AAP+ (2019)

Shiromani Akali Dal (Taksali) was an Indian political party which was formed by Ranjit Singh Brahmpura, Rattan Singh Ajnala and Sewa Singh Sekhwan on 16 December 2018.

== History ==
On 4 November 2018, Shiromani Akali Dal expelled Sewa Singh Sekhwan, a former Minister. On 12 November 2018, the party expelled Ranjit Singh Brahmpural MP from Khadoor Sahib, former MP Rattan Singh Ajnala, Ravinder Singh Brahmpura, and Amarpal Singh Ajnala.

All were expelled from the party because they accused the party president, Sukhbir Singh Badal, and the former minister Bikram Singh Majithia, of "destroying the reputation of the party, Akal Takht and of the Shiromani Gurudwara Prabandhak Committee". Harsukhinder Singh Bubby Badal led the party's youth wing and rabidly opposed his close relatives, the Badal family. He bid farewell to his family, accusing them of being "anti-Panthic," particularly Bikram Singh Majithia, whom he accused of "trying to take over Shiromani Akali Dal through the back door."

=== Election ===
The newly formed party simultaneously declared that it would contest all Lok Sabha seats of Punjab in 2019 Indian general election and 2022 Punjab Legislative Assembly election.

Shiromani Akali Dal (Taksali) became a member of the Punjab Democratic Alliance in 2018, but due to differences on seats sharing, the alliance was short lived. It then attempted to form an alliance with Aam Aadmi Party for Lok Sabha election in Punjab. However, it failed to make consensus with the Aam Aadmi Party on seat sharing and decided to contest election alone.

In 2019 Indian general election, the party unsuccessfully contested only one 1 seat, Anandpur Sahib.

=== Decline ===
On 13 February 2020, Rattan Singh Ajnala and Amarpal Singh Ajnala rejoined Shiromani Akali Dal in presence of Sukhbir Singh Badal. On 7 July 2020, Sukhdev Singh Dhindsa, Parminder Singh Dhindsa, Sewa Singh Sekhwan, alongside other members left the party and made their own group. Only two of the original four party founders, Ranjit Singh Brahmpura and Manmohan Singh Sathiala remained. This coincided with the 100th year anniversary of the foundation of Shiromani Akali Dal.

In April 2021, the party merged with Sukhdev Singh Dhindsa's Shiromani Akali Dal (Democratic) to form a new party, Shiromani Akali Dal (Sanyukt).
