= Amarinder Singh =

15th Chief Minister of Punjab, India

Captain (Retd.) Amarinder Singh
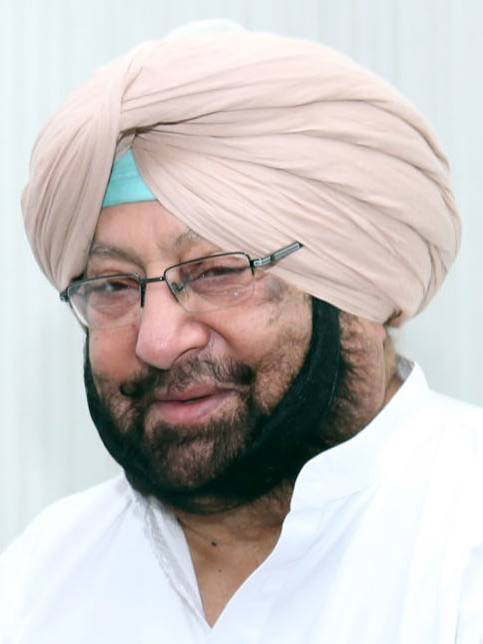
- Singh in 2017

15th Chief Minister of Punjab
- In office 16 March 2017 – 19 September 2021
- Governor: V. P. Singh Badnore; Banwarilal Purohit
- Preceded by: Parkash Singh Badal
- Succeeded by: Charanjit Singh Channi
- In office 26 February 2002 – 1 March 2007
- Governor: J. F. R. Jacob; O. P. Verma; Akhlaqur Rahman Kidwai (additional charge); Sunith Francis Rodrigues
- Deputy: Rajinder Kaur Bhattal (from 6 January 2004)
- Preceded by: Parkash Singh Badal
- Succeeded by: Parkash Singh Badal
Additional ministries
In office 16 March 2017 – 18 September 2021
Ministries and Departments	Minister of Administrative Reforms, Agriculture and Farmers' Welfare, Horticulture, Conservation of Land and Water, Excise & Taxation, General Administration, Home Affairs & Justice, Legal & Legislative Affairs, Vigilance, Personnel, Civil Aviation, Defence Services Welfare, Hospitality, Investment Promotion, Information & Public Relations, Environment, Wildlife, NRI Affairs; Government of Punjab, India
Preceded by	Parkash Singh Badal
Succeeded by	Charanjit Singh Channi

Member of the Legislative Assembly, Punjab
- In office 11 March 2017 – 15 March 2022
- Preceded by: Preneet Kaur
- Succeeded by: Ajit Pal Singh Kohli
- Constituency: Patiala
- In office 2002–2014
- Preceded by: Surjit Singh Kohli
- Succeeded by: Preneet Kaur
- Constituency: Patiala Town
- In office 1992–1997
- Preceded by: Hardial Singh Rajla
- Succeeded by: Jagtar Singh Rajla
- Constituency: Samana
- In office 1985–1992
- Preceded by: Avtar Singh
- Succeeded by: Harminder Singh
- Constituency: Talwandi Sabo

Member of Parliament, Lok Sabha
- In office 26 May 2014 – 23 November 2016
- Preceded by: Navjot Singh Sidhu
- Succeeded by: Gurjeet Singh Aujla
- Constituency: Amritsar
- In office 1980–1984
- Preceded by: Gurcharan Singh Tohra
- Succeeded by: Charanjit Singh Walia
- Constituency: Patiala

Personal details
- Born: 11 March 1942 (age 84) Patiala, Patiala State, Punjab States Agency, British India (present-day Punjab, India)
- Party: Bharatiya Janata Party
- Other political affiliations: Punjab Lok Congress; Indian National Congress; Shiromani Akali Dal (Panthic); Akali Dal – Parkash Singh Badal Group; United Akali Dal; Shiromani Akali Dal
- Spouse: Preneet Kaur (m. 1964)
- Children: 2, including Raninder Singh
- Parents: Yadavindra Singh (father); Mohinder Kaur (mother)
- Website: Official website

Military service
- Allegiance: India
- Branch/service: Indian Army
- Years of service: 1963–1966
- Rank: Captain
- Unit: Sikh Regiment
- Battles/wars: Indo-Pakistani War of 1965
- Pretender information
- Title(s): Maharaja of Patiala
- Throne(s) claimed: Patiala
- Pretend from: 17 June 1974–present
- Monarchy abolished: Sovereign monarchy 1947 (Instrument of Accession); Titular monarchy 1971 (26th Amendment of the Indian Constitution)
- Predecessor: Yadavindra Singh

Amarinder Singh (born 11 March 1942) is an Indian politician, military historian, former royal and Indian Army veteran who served as the 15th Chief Minister of Punjab. His father, Yadavindra Singh, was the last Maharaja of the princely state of Patiala and a member of the historical Phulkian dynasty. Before starting his political career, Singh was an officer in the Indian Army, where he served from 1963 to 1966.

In his long political career, Singh has served in numerous positions, including as a Member of the Legislative Assembly in Punjab and as a Member of Parliament, Lok Sabha. He also served as the president of the Punjab Pradesh Congress Committee thrice. Singh served as the Chief Minister of Punjab from 2002 to 2007 and 2017 to 2021. As of November 2022, Singh also serves as the chairman of the Punjab Urdu Academy. On 19 September 2022, he merged his party, Punjab Lok Congress, which he formed after leaving the Indian National Congress, with the Bharatiya Janata Party (BJP), and he joined the BJP on the same day.

== Early life and education ==
Singh was born on 11 March 1942 in Patiala, Patiala State, Punjab Province, British India. He was born into a royal Punjabi Jat Sikh family of the Sidhu clan to parents Maharaja Sir Yadavindra Singh and Maharani Mohinder Kaur of Patiala. His father, Yadavindra, was the last Maharaja of Patiala. Singh's family belongs to the historical Phulkian dynasty. In his youth, Singh held the tile of Yuvraj, which meant crown prince; however, royal titles were abolished by the Government of India in 1971 by the 26th Amendment to the Constitution of India.

Singh attended the Loreto Convent in Kaithu, Shimla and Lawrence School in Kasauli, Solan District, before going to The Doon School in Dehradun.

== Army career ==
Singh served in the Indian Army from June 1963 to December 1966 after graduating from the National Defence Academy and the Indian Military Academy. He was commissioned into the Sikh Regiment. He served as the aide-de-camp to the General Officer Commanding-in-Chief Western Command, Lieutenant General Harbaksh Singh, from December 1964. He left the army in early 1965 to look after his family but returned to service with the start of the 1965 Indo-Pakistan War.

His father and grandfather, Maharaja Bhupinder Singh, served in the Indian Army and the British Indian Army, and Singh stated, in 2010, that the Army will always be his first love.

== Political career ==
=== Early career ===
Singh was inducted into the Indian National Congress (INC) by Rajiv Gandhi, his friend from school and who later became Prime Minister of India, and was first elected to the Lok Sabha in 1980. In 1984, he resigned from Parliament and from the INC as a protest against the Army's actions during Operation Blue Star. Subsequently, he joined the Shiromani Akali Dal and The Sikh Forum, was elected to the state legislature from Talwandi Sabo and became a minister in the Punjab state government for Agriculture, Forest, Development and Panchayats.

In protest of Operation Black Thunder which was approved by Chief Minister of Punjab Surjit Singh Barnala, 27 MLAs led by Parkash Singh Badal and Amarinder Singh split from the mainstream Shiromani Akali Dal and formed Akali Dal – Parkash Singh Badal Group in 1986.

He was temporarily a part of the United Akali Dal, which supported Khalistan. He was contesting alongside politicians like Simranjit Singh Mann, Baba Joginder Singh Rode (father of Jarnail Singh Bhindranwale) and Parkash Singh Badal.

In 1992, Singh broke away from the Akali Dal – Parkash Singh Badal Group and formed a splinter party, Shiromani Akali Dal (Panthic). His party later merged with the Congress in 1998, after a crushing defeat in the Vidhan Sabha election in which Singh was defeated from his own constituency, getting only 856 votes, and after Sonia Gandhi took over the reins of the party. He was defeated by Prem Singh Chandumajra from the Patiala Constituency in 1998 by a margin of 33,251 votes.

=== Punjab Pradesh Congress Committee and state politics ===
Singh's served as the President of Punjab Pradesh Congress Committee (PPCC) on three occasions from 1999 to 2002, 2010 to 2013 and 2015 to 2017. Singh's second term as the PPCC president was also noted for the influence wielded by his first cousin, Arvind Khanna, the son of Singh's paternal aunt, Naginder Kumari Khanna. Khanna used his wealth to fund Singh's political activities and took control of his office and the PPCC's political strategy.

Singh has been a member of the Punjab Vidhan Sabha for five terms representing Patiala (Urban) thrice, Samana and Talwandi Sabo once each. In 2012, his brother Malvinder left the INC after being denied the candidature from Samana for the Punjab Assembly elections; however, he rejoined the party in 2014.

=== Chief Minister of Punjab, first term ===
He became the Chief Minister of Punjab in 2002, and his term continued until 2007.

=== Punjab Opposition ===
In September 2008, a special committee of the Punjab Vidhan Sabha, during the tenure of a government led by the Akali Dal and Bharatiya Janata Party coalition, expelled him on the count of regularities in the transfer of land related to the Amritsar Improvement Trust. In 2010, the Supreme Court of India held his expulsion unconstitutional on the grounds that it was excessive and unconstitutional.

=== Member of Parliament ===
He defeated senior Bharatiya Janata Party leader Arun Jaitley by a margin of 102,770 votes in 2014 general elections from Amritsar seat. On 27 November 2015, Amarinder Singh was appointed President of Punjab Congress in the run up to Punjab elections slated for 2017.

=== Chief Minister of Punjab, second term ===
On 11 March 2017 Congress Party won the 2017 Punjab Legislative Assembly election under his leadership. Amarinder Singh was sworn in as the 26th Chief Minister of Punjab on 16 March 2017 at Punjab Raj Bhavan, Chandigarh. The oath of office was administered by the Punjab governor, V.P. Singh Badnore. He was appointed president of the Jat Mahasabha in 2013.

During his tenure as chief minister, he came into conflict with a faction of the Congress headed by Navjot Singh Sidhu, and was criticised for being inaccessible to Congress MLAs, living in a farmhouse on the outskirts of Chandigarh instead of coming to the civil secretariat building. He also received criticism for not resolving the Bargari sacrilege case and for a perception that he had been insufficiently zealous in prosecuting previous CM Parkash Singh Badal for involvement in the case. In 2019, Singh was criticised for reportedly naming Maharaja Bhupinder Singh Sports and Science University after his grandfather; however, it was also reported that the university's name was decided by a majority of the Punjab government's cabinet ministers and that Singh himself had objected to naming it after Bhupinder Singh.

On 18 September 2021, he resigned as the Chief Minister of Punjab, as a consequence of conversations with the Congress' leadership that suggested the Punjab Congress MLAs were lacking confidence in his leadership. Singh publicly blamed Sidhu for the internal tension that led to the resignation, calling him "dangerous", "incompetent", and a "total disaster" and that he would fight any attempt to name Sidhu as the next Chief Minister of Punjab. Singh also stated that he was humiliated by the Congress' leadership on how they removed him from office. He was eventually succeeded by Charanjit Singh Channi as the new chief minister.

Singh left the Congress Party, and on 28 October 2021, announced that he would be forming a new party soon and that he would be allying with the Bharatiya Janata Party.

=== Punjab Lok Congress ===
Punjab Lok Congress (PLC; English: Punjab People's Congress) is an Indian regional political party, in Punjab founded by Singh on 2 November 2021 after he resigned as Chief Minister of Punjab and had quit the INC. The party was formed following a split in INC. Singh announced that his party will contest on all 117 seats in the 2022 Punjab Legislative Assembly election. The party failed to win any seat in the elections.

=== 2022 Punjab Assembly election ===
In the 2022 Punjab Legislative Assembly election, Singh lost from the Patiala Assembly constituency to Aam Aadmi Party's Ajit Pal Singh Kohli. Singh's party, PLC, lost election deposits in all but one of the 28 seats it had contested and garnered 0.54% of the total votes polled.

=== Bharatiya Janata Party ===
A few months after his election failure, Singh, along with his party merged, into the Bharatiya Janata Party on 19 September 2022 after meeting with Home Minister Amit Shah a few days before. During the 2024 Indian General Election, Singh was absent from the BJP's electoral campaigns in Punjab due to health related reasons. In October 2024, after a one and a half year absence from active politics, Singh made a public visit to the grain market in Khanna. In November 2024, Singh criticised Prime Minister of Canada Justin Trudeau, stating that his support for Khalistan movement separatists in Canada led to the deterioration in India-Canada relations.

== Corruption charges ==
In 2025, the Enforcement Directorate (ED) initiated an investigation into Captain Amarinder Singh and his son, Raninder Singh, for alleged possession of undisclosed foreign assets, including a Swiss bank account. The probe is based on information shared by French authorities with India's Income Tax Department under the Indo-French Double Taxation Avoidance Agreement (DTAA). The Punjab and Haryana High Court dismissed their petitions to prevent the ED from accessing related income tax documents, allowing the investigation to proceed. The court ruled that the ED, as a statutory authority under the Foreign Exchange Management Act (FEMA), is entitled to examine judicial records during its investigation, and that such access does not violate the DTAA.

== Books ==
He has also written books on war and Sikh history which include A Ridge Too Far, Lest We Forget, The Last Sunset: Rise and Fall of Lahore Durbar and The Sikhs in Britain: 150 years of Photographs. Among his most recent works are Honour and Fidelity: India's Military Contribution to the Great War 1914 to 1918 released in Chandigarh on 6 December 2014, and The Monsoon War: Young Officers Reminisce – 1965 India-Pakistan War- which contains his memoirs of the 1965 Indo-Pakistani war.

== Awards and recognition ==
The author Khushwant Singh released a biographic book titled, Captain Amarinder Singh: The People's Maharaja in 2017.

== Personal life and family ==
Singh has one son, Raninder Singh, and one daughter, Jai Inder Kaur. Both his children are politicians. His wife, Preneet Kaur, served as a Member of Parliament and was Minister of State in the Ministry of External Affairs from 2009 to 2012. His son, Raninder, is married to Reshma Kaur, a businesswoman and the daughter of Kuldip Singh Dhingra, an owner of the paint company Berger Paints. Singh's grandson Angad, the son of his daughter Jai Inder, married Aparajita Kumari, the daughter of Virbhadra Singh, former Chief Minister of Himachal Pradesh. His other grandson, Nirvan, the son of his daughter Jai Inder, married Mriganka Singh, the daughter of politician Vikramaditya Singh and the granddaughter of Karan Singh, a politician and former Governor of Jammu and Kashmir. Singh's granddaughter Seherinder Kaur, the daughter of his son Raninder Singh, married businessman Aditya Narang.

Singh's elder sister, Heminder Kaur, was married to former Minister of External Affairs, K. Natwar Singh. He is also related to Shiromani Akali Dal (Amritsar) leader and former Indian Police Service officer Simranjit Singh Mann. Mann's wife and Singh's wife, Preneet Kaur, are sisters.

Lok Sabha
Preceded by Gurcharan Singh Tohra	Member of Parliament for Patiala; 1980–1984	Succeeded by Sardar Charanjit Singh Walia
Preceded by Navjot Singh Sidhu	Member of Parliament for Amritsar; 2014–2017	Succeeded by Gurjeet Singh Aujla
Political offices
Preceded by Parkash Singh Badal	Chief Minister of Punjab; 26 February 2002 – 1 March 2007	Succeeded by Parkash Singh Badal
Preceded by Parkash Singh Badal	Chief Minister of Punjab; 16 March 2017 – 18 September 2021	Succeeded by Charanjit Singh Channi
State Legislative Assembly
Preceded by Preneet Kaur (INC)	Member of the Punjab Legislative Assembly from Patiala Assembly constituency 2017 – 2022	Succeeded by Ajit Pal Singh Kohli (AAP)
