= Shiromani Akali Dal =

Political party in India

- President: Sukhbir Singh Badal
- General Secretary: Balwinder Singh Bhundar.
- Lok Sabha Leader: Harsimrat Kaur Badal
- Founded: 14 December 1920 (105 years ago)
- Headquarters: Block #6, Madhya Marg; Sector 28, Chandigarh
- Newspaper: Akali Awaaz
- Student wing: Student Organisation of India; Ranbir Singh Rana Dhillon
- Youth wing: Sarabjit Singh Jhinjar
- Women's wing: Istri Akali Dal
- Labour wing: Shiromani Akali Dal SC wing
- Peasant's wing: Shiromani Akali Dal BC wing
- Ideology: Conservatism; Punjabiyat; Punjabi nationalism Federalism
- Political position: Centre-right to right-wing
- Colours: Navy Blue
- ECI status: State Party
- Alliance: SAD+BSP (2021–2023); SAD+INLD (2021–present); NDA (1998–2020)
- Seats in Rajya Sabha: 0 / 245
- Seats in Lok Sabha: 1 / 543
- Seats in Punjab Legislative Assembly: 2 / 117

Election symbol

Website
- www.shiromaniakalidal.com

The Shiromani Akali Dal (SAD; transl. Supreme Eternal Party) is a centre-right and Sikh-centric state-level political party in Punjab, India. It is the second-oldest party in India, after Congress, being founded in 1920. Although there are many parties with the description Akali Dal, the party that is recognised as "Shiromani Akali Dal" by the Election Commission of India is the one led by Sukhbir Singh Badal. The party has a moderate Punjabi agenda. On 26 September 2020, it left the National Democratic Alliance over the farm bills.

== History ==
=== British India ===
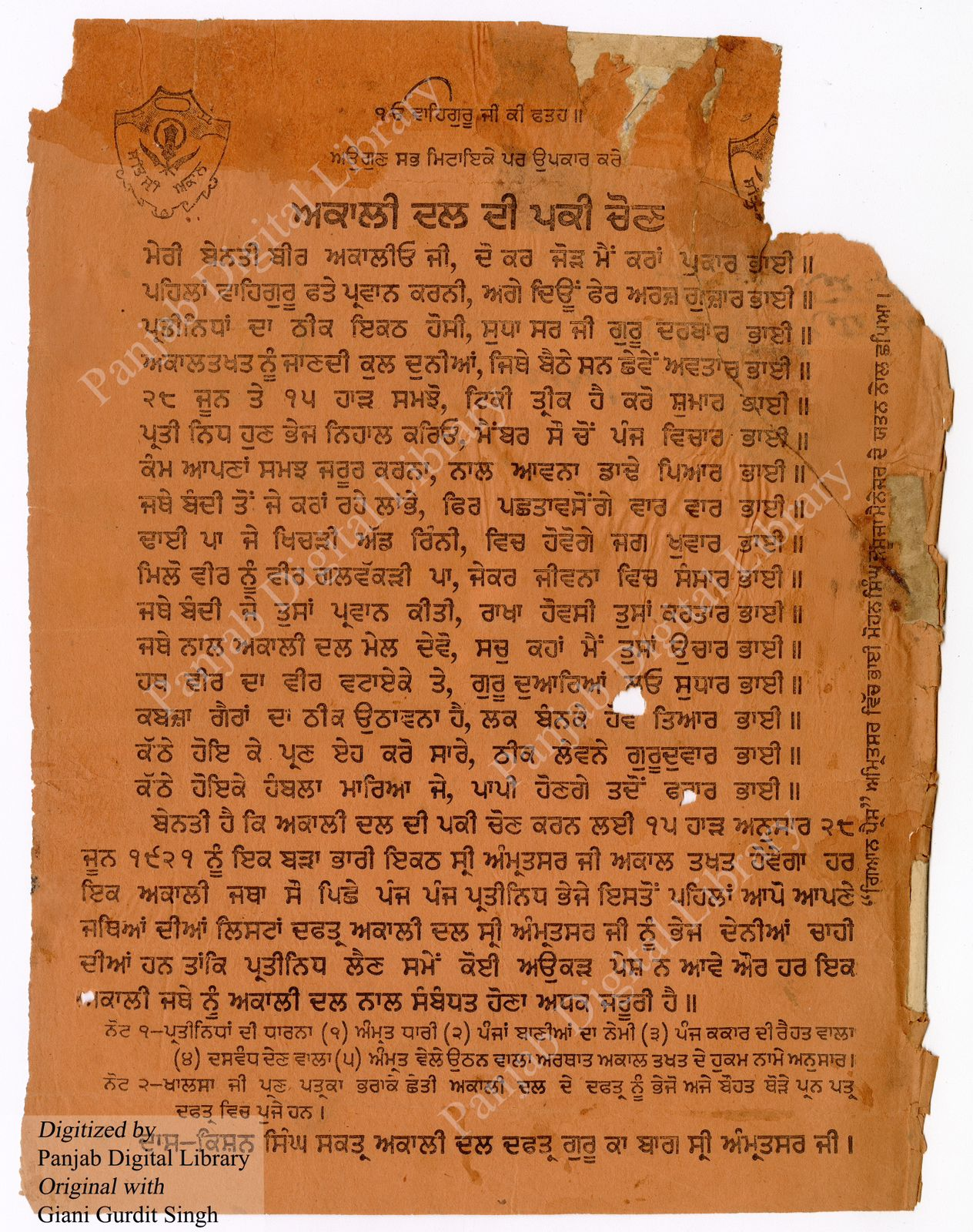
Poster released in 1921 by the Secretary Akali Dal, appealing to all Akali factions to unite or face extinction, Amritsar, circa June 1921. Digitised by the Panjab Digital Library.

Akali Dal was formed on 14 December 1920 as a task force of the Shiromani Gurudwara Prabandhak Committee, the Sikh religious body. The Akali Dal considers itself the principal representative of Sikhs. Sardar Sarmukh Singh Chubbal was the first president of a unified proper Akali Dal, but it became popular under Master Tara Singh. Akali movement influenced 30 new Punjabi newspapers launched between 1920 and 1925.

In the provincial election of 1937, the Akali Dal won 10 seats. The Khalsa Nationalists won 11 seats and joined the coalition government headed by the Unionist leader Sikander Hyat Khan. The Akalis sat in opposition and made occasional forays into reaching an understanding with the Muslim League, which never reached fruition.

In the provincial election of 1946, the Akali Dal won 22 seats and joined the coalition government headed by the Unionist Khizar Hayat Khan Tiwana, along with the Indian National Congress. The Muslim League was unable to capture power, despite having won the largest number of seats, which perhaps suited it fine as it strengthened its Pakistan demand. The Muslim League launched a civil disobedience campaign, bringing down the Tiwana government by March 1947. The rest of the period till Indian independence was filled by Governor's Rule.

As with other Sikh organisations, Master Tara Singh and his Akali Dal strongly opposed the partition of India, which he thought would create an environment of possible persecution.

=== Post Independence India ===
In the 1950s, the party launched the Punjabi Suba movement, demanding a state with majority of Punjabi speaking people, out of undivided East Punjab under the leadership of Sant Fateh Singh. In 1966, the present Punjab was formed. Akali Dal came to power in the new Punjab in March 1967, but early governments didn't live long due to internal conflicts and power struggles within the party. Later, party strengthened and party governments completed full term.

=== List of breakaway parties or other Akali factions ===
Year(s)	Party	Abbr.	Leader	Status
1962-1968	Akali Dal – Sant Fateh Singh Group	AD – SFS	Sant Fateh Singh	Defunct (merged back into Shiromani Akali Dal)
1962-1968	Akali Dal – Master Tara Singh Group	AD – MTS	Master Tara Singh	Defunct (merged back into Shiromani Akali Dal)
1980-1995	Akali Dal – Jagdev Singh Talwandi Group	AD (T)	Jagdev Singh Talwandi	Defunct (merged back into Shiromani Akali Dal)
1985-1994 (1st time)	United Akali Dal (Known as "Akali Dal – Mann Group")	UAD	Baba Joginder Singh, Simranjit Singh Mann	Defunct (merged into Shiromani Akali Dal (Amritsar))
1986-1995	Akali Dal – Parkash Singh Badal Group	AD (B)	Parkash Singh Badal	Defunct (consolidated power over main Shiromani Akali Dal)
1991-1997	Shiromani Akali Dal (Panthic)	SAD (P)	Captain Amarinder Singh	Defunct (merged into Indian National Congress)
1992-1994	Akali Dal – Babbar Group	AD (Babbar)	Jasmer Singh Bala	Defunct (merged into Shiromani Akali Dal (Amritsar))
1992-1994	Akali Dal – Manjit Singh Group	AD (M)	Manjit Singh (AISSF)	Defunct (merged into Shiromani Akali Dal (Amritsar))
1992-1994	Akali Dal – Kabul Singh Group	AD (K)	Kabul Singh	Defunct (merged into Shiromani Akali Dal (Amritsar))
1992-1995	Akali Dal – Sukhjinder Khaira Group	AD (S)	Sukhjinder Singh Khaira	Defunct (merged back into Shiromani Akali Dal)
1994	Shiromani Akali Dal (Amritsar)	SAD (A)	Simranjit Singh Mann	active
1996-2004 (1st time)	Shiromani Akali Dal (Democratic)	SAD (D)	Kuldip Singh Wadala	Defunct (merged back into Shiromani Akali Dal)
1999-2003	Sarb Hind Shiromani Akali Dal	SHSAD	Gurcharan Singh Tohra	Defunct (merged back into Shiromani Akali Dal)
1999	Shiromani Akali Dal Delhi	SADD	Paramjit Singh Sarna	active
2004-2007 (1st time)	Shiromani Akali Dal (Longowal)	SAD (L)	Surjit Kaur Barnala	Defunct (merged back into Shiromani Akali Dal)
2011-2016	People's Party of Punjab	PPoP	Manpreet Singh Badal	Defunct (merged into Indian National Congress)
2014	Akali Dal (1920)	AD (1920)	Ravi Inder Singh	active
2014 (2nd time)	Shiromani Akali Dal (Longowal)	SAD (L)	Surjit Kaur Barnala	Defunct (merged into Indian National Congress)
2014-2020 (2nd time)	United Akali Dal	UAD	Bhai Mokham Singh	Defunct (merged into Shiromani Akali Dal (Democratic))
2018-2021	Shiromani Akali Dal (Taksali)	SAD (T)	Ranjit Singh Brahmpura	Defunct (merged into Shiromani Akali Dal (Sanyukt))
2020-2021 (2nd time)	Shiromani Akali Dal (Democratic)	SAD (D)	Sukhdev Singh Dhindsa	Defunct (merged into Shiromani Akali Dal (Sanyukt))
2021-2024	Shiromani Akali Dal (Sanyukt)	SAD (S)	Sukhdev Singh Dhindsa	Defunct (merged back into Shiromani Akali Dal)
2025	Shiromani Akali Dal (Punar Surjit)	SAD (PS)	Giani Harpreet Singh	active
2025	Akali Dal (Waris Punjab De) (Note: Although AD(WPD) technically did not split from SAD and was instead formed as an entirely new entity, it is fair to include it in this section as many rebel SAD leaders have joined AD(WPD).)	AD (WPD)	Amritpal Singh	active

== Ideology ==
Shiromani Akali Dal's main goals are the protection of Sikh rights, Punjab's waters, and opposition to the Sutlej Yamuna link canal.

=== 1996 Moga Conference ===
In 1996, at a historic conference in Moga, Shiromani Akali Dal adopted a moderate Punjabi agenda and shifted party headquarters from Amritsar to Chandigarh.

== Party Presidents ==
Following is the list of presidents of the party as given on the party website.

S. No.	Name	Portrait	Term Start	Term End	Duration
1	Sarmukh Singh Jhabal	--	17 February 1919	27 March 1920	1 year, 39 days
2	Kharak Singh		--	--	--
3	Master Tara Singh		--	--	--
4	Gopal Singh Qaumi		--	--	--
5	Tara Singh Thethar	--	--	--	—-
6	Teja Singh Akarpuri		--	1945	--
7	Babu Labh Singh	--	1945	9 March 1947	2 years, 67 days
8	Udham Singh Nagoke		--	--	--
9	Giani Kartar Singh	--	--	--	—-
10	Pritam Singh Gojran (Gujjran Sangrur)	--	--	--	—-
11	Hukam Singh	--	--	--	—-
1968: Reunification of Akali Dal – Master Tara Singh Group and Akali Dal – Sant Fateh Singh Group
12	Fateh Singh	--	--	--	—-
13	Achar Singh	--	--	--	—-
14	Bhupinder Singh	--	--	--	—-
15	Mohan Singh Tur		--	1978	--
16	Jagdev Singh Talwandi		1978	1980	2 years, 0 days
17	Harchand Singh Longowal		1980	20 August 1985	5 years, 231 days
18	Surjit Singh Barnala		27 September 1985	1996	10 years, 96 days
1995: Reunification of Akali Dal – Parkash Singh Badal Group, Akali Dal – Jagdev Singh Talwandi Group, Akali Dal - Tohra Group, Akali Dal – Sukhjinder Khaira Group, and Shiromani Akali Dal (Longowal) (Note: Shiromani Akali Dal (Longowal) referred to the main Shiromani Akali Dal which had the official ECI name and scale symbol, and was under Surjit Singh Barnala’s presidency.)
19	Parkash Singh Badal		1996	2008	12 years, 0 days
20	Sukhbir Singh Badal		2008	29 August 2024	16 years, 241 days
2024: Factional split
21	Balwinder Singh Bhunder		29 August 2024	12 April 2025	226 days
22	Sukhbir Singh Badal		12 April 2025	Present	1 year, 166 days

== Current Members in Houses ==
House	Current Members	Leader
Union Parliament
Lok Sabha	1	Harsimrat Kaur Badal
State Legislature
Punjab Legislative Assembly	1 / 117	Ganieve Kaur Majithia

== List of Union Leaders ==
No.	Portrait	Name	Term in office		Duration	Portfolio	Prime Minister
1		Parkash Singh Badal	26 March 1977	27 March 1977	1 day	Minister of Communications	Morarji Desai
1		Parkash Singh Badal	28 March 1977	17 June 1977	81 days	Minister of Agriculture and Irrigation	Morarji Desai
2		Surjit Singh Barnala	18 June 1977	28 July 1979	2 years, 40 days	Minister of Agriculture and Irrigation	Morarji Desai
2		Surjit Singh Barnala	19 March 1998	13 October 1999	1 year, 208 days	Minister of Chemicals and Fertilizers	Atal Bihari Vajpayee
2		Surjit Singh Barnala	19 March 1998	13 October 1999	1 year, 208 days	Minister of Food and Consumer Affairs	Atal Bihari Vajpayee
3		Sukhbir Singh Badal	20 March 1998	13 October 1999	1 year, 207 days	Minister of State in the Ministry of Industry	Atal Bihari Vajpayee
4		Sukhdev Singh Dhindsa	22 November 1999	26 November 1999	4 days	Minister of Works and Estates (Merged with Ministry of Urban Development)	Atal Bihari Vajpayee
4		Sukhdev Singh Dhindsa	7 November 2000	22 May 2004	3 years, 197 days	Minister of Chemicals and Fertilizers	Atal Bihari Vajpayee
4		Sukhdev Singh Dhindsa	27 May 2000	7 November 2000	164 days	Minister of Mines	Atal Bihari Vajpayee
4		Sukhdev Singh Dhindsa	2 February 2000	7 November 2000	279 days	Minister of Youth Affairs and Sports	Atal Bihari Vajpayee
5		Harsimrat Kaur Badal	27 May 2014	30 May 2019	5 years, 3 days	Minister of Food Processing Industries	Narendra Modi
5		Harsimrat Kaur Badal	31 May 2019	18 September 2020	1 year, 110 days	Minister of Food Processing Industries	Narendra Modi

== List of Chief Ministers ==
Sr. No.	Portrait	Chief Minister	Constituency	In Office		Duration
Sr. No.	Portrait	Chief Minister	Constituency	From	To	Duration
1		Gurnam Singh (1899–1973)	Qila Raipur	17 February 1969	27 March 1970	1 year, 38 days
2		Surjit Singh Barnala (1925–2017)	Barnala	29 September 1985	11 June 1987	1 year, 255 days
3		Parkash Singh Badal (1927–2023)	Gidderbaha	27 March 1970	14 June 1971	1 year, 79 days
3		Parkash Singh Badal (1927–2023)	Gidderbaha	20 June 1977	17 February 1980	2 years, 242 days
3		Parkash Singh Badal (1927–2023)	Lambi	12 February 1997	26 February 2002	5 years, 14 days
3		Parkash Singh Badal (1927–2023)	Lambi	1 March 2007	14 March 2012	5 years, 13 days
3		Parkash Singh Badal (1927–2023)	Lambi	14 March 2012	16 March 2017	5 years, 2 days

== List of Deputy Chief Ministers ==
Sr. No.	Name (constituency) (birth-death)	Portrait	Term of office			Chief Minister	Appointed by
1	Sukhbir Singh Badal ( - ) (born 1962)		21 January 2009	1 July 2009	161 days	Prakash Singh Badal	S. F. Rodrigues
2	Sukhbir Singh Badal (Jalalabad) (born 1962)		10 August 2009	14 March 2012	2 years, 217 days	Prakash Singh Badal	S. F. Rodrigues
2	Sukhbir Singh Badal (Jalalabad) (born 1962)		14 March 2012	16 March 2017	5 years, 2 days	Prakash Singh Badal	Shivraj Patil

== General Elections ==
General Elections Results
Year	General Election	Seats Won	Change in # of Seats	Percentage of Vote	Vote Swing
1945	6th Central Legislative Assembly	2	Steady	—	—
1951	1st Lok Sabha	4	▲2	0.99%	—
1957	2nd Lok Sabha	0	▼4	—	—
1962	3rd Lok Sabha	3	▲3	0.72%	—
1967	4th Lok Sabha	3	Steady	—	—
1971	5th Lok Sabha	1	▼2	0.87%	—
1977	6th Lok Sabha	9	▲8	1.26%	—
1980	7th Lok Sabha	1	▼8	0.71%	—
1984	8th Lok Sabha	7	▲6	17.9%	—
1989	9th Lok Sabha	0	▼7	—	—
1991	10th Lok Sabha	0	Steady	—	—
1996	11th Lok Sabha	8	▲8	0.76%	—
1998	12th Lok Sabha	8	Steady	0.81%	—
1999	13th Lok Sabha	2	▼6	25.58%	—
2004	14th Lok Sabha	8	▲6	34.28%	—
2009	15th Lok Sabha	4	▼4	0.96%	—
2014	16th Lok Sabha	4	Steady	20.30%	▼13.55%
2019	17th Lok Sabha	2	▼2	27.45%	▲13.9%
2024	18th Lok Sabha	1	▼1	13.42%	▼14.03%

== In state elections ==
=== Punjab Provincial Assembly Elections ===
Legislative Assembly elections
Election Year	Leader	seats contested	seats won	+/- in seats	Overall votes	% of overall votes	+/- in vote share	Sitting side
1937	Master Tara Singh	81	11 / 175	Steady	1,788,856	5.58	Steady	Others
1946	Master Tara Singh	81	20 / 175	▲9	3,550,212	10.94	▲5.36	Others

=== Punjab Legislative Assembly Elections ===
Legislative Assembly elections
Election Year	Leader	seats contested	seats won	+/- in seats	Overall votes	% of overall votes	+/- in vote share	Sitting side
1952	Gopal Singh Khalsa	48	13 / 126	▲13	620,455	12.44	▲12.44	Opposition
1957	Contested with Congress and 28 Akali leaders won.							
1962	Gurnam Singh	46	16 / 154	▲16	799,925	11.87	▲11.87	Opposition
1967	Sant Fateh Singh (SFSG)	59	24 / 104	▲24	871,742	20.48	▲20.48	Opposition
1967	Master Tara Singh (MTSG)	61	2 / 104	▲2	178,746	4.20	▲4.20	Opposition
1969	Gurnam Singh	65	43 / 104	▲43	1,381,916	29.36	▲29.36	Government
1972	Jaswinder Singh Brar	72	24 / 104	▼19	1,344,437	27.64	▼1.72	Opposition
1977	Parkash Singh Badal	70	58 / 117	▲34	1,776,602	31.41	▲3.8	Government
1980	Harchand Singh Longowal	73	37 / 117	▼21	1,683,266	26.92	▼4.49	Opposition
1985	Surjit Singh Barnala	100	73 / 117	▲23	2,630,270	38.01	▲11.09	Government
1992	Boycotted the elections							
1997	Parkash Singh Badal	92	75 / 117	▲75	3,873,099	37.64	▲37.64	Government
2002	Parkash Singh Badal	92	41 / 117	▼34	3,196,924	31.08	▼6.56	Opposition
2007	Parkash Singh Badal	93	48 / 117	▲7	4,689,018	37.09	▲6.01	Government
2012	Parkash Singh Badal	94	56 / 117	▲8	4,828,612	34.73	▼2.36	Government
2017	Parkash Singh Badal	94	15 / 117	▼41	3,898,161	25.2	▼9.4	Others
2022	Sukhbir Singh Badal	97	1 / 117	▼12	2,861,286	18.38	▼6.86	Others

=== Haryana Legislative Assembly Elections ===
Legislative Assembly elections
Election Year	Leader	seats contested	seats won	+/- in seats	Overall votes	% of overall votes	+/- in vote share	Sitting side
2009	Charanjeet Kaur Mallour	2	1 / 90	Steady	9,490,092	0.98	Steady	Opposition
2014	Balkaur Singh	5	1 / 90	Steady	12,426,968	0.6	▼0.38	Coalition
2019	Rajinder Singh Desujodha	3	0 / 90	▼1	12,520,177	0.38	▼0.22	Extra-parliamentary

=== Delhi Legislative Assembly Elections ===
Legislative Assembly elections
Election Year	Leader	seats contested	seats won	+/- in seats	Overall votes	% of overall votes	+/- in vote share	Sitting side
2013	Manjinder Singh Sirsa	4	1 / 70	Steady	7,699,800	1	Steady	Government
2015	Manjinder Singh Sirsa	1	0 / 90	▼1	8,978,269	0.5	▼0.5	Extra-parliamentary

== Core Committee ==
Sr. No.	Name (constituency) (birth)	Portrait	Term of office		
1	Sarabjeet Singh Jhinjer ( - ) (born 1982)		8 June 2023	16 July 2024	1 year, 38 days

== See also ==
- Splinter groups of the Akali Dal
- Sikhism
- Tara Singh
- Babu Labh Singh
- Akali (disambiguation)
- Akali Dal (Waris Punjab De)
- Shiromani Akali Dal (Punar Surjit)
- List of political parties in India

== Bibliography ==
- Jalal, Ayesha (1994) [First published 1985], The Sole Spokesman: Jinnah, the Muslim League and the Demand for Pakistan, Cambridge University Press, ISBN 978-0-521-45850-4
- Jalal, Ayesha (2002), Self and Sovereignty: Individual and Community in South Asian Islam Since 1850, Routledge, ISBN 978-1-134-59937-0
- Talbot, Ian (1998), Pakistan: A Modern History, St. Martin's Press, ISBN 978-0-312-21606-1
- Harjinder Singh Dilgeer. Sikh Twareekh. Sikh University Press, Belgium, 2007. 5 volumes (in Punjabi)
- Harjinder Singh Dilgeer. Sikh History. Sikh University Press, Belgium, 2010–11. 10 volumes
- Harjinder Singh Dilgeer. Shiromani Akali Dal (1920-2000). Sikh University Press, Belgium, 2001.
- Harjinder Singh Dilgeer. NAVAN MAHAN KOSH (DILGEER KOSH, ਦਿਲਗੀਰ ਕੋਸ਼). Sikh University Press, England, 2021.
