= Parkash Singh Badal =

Indian politician (1927–2023)

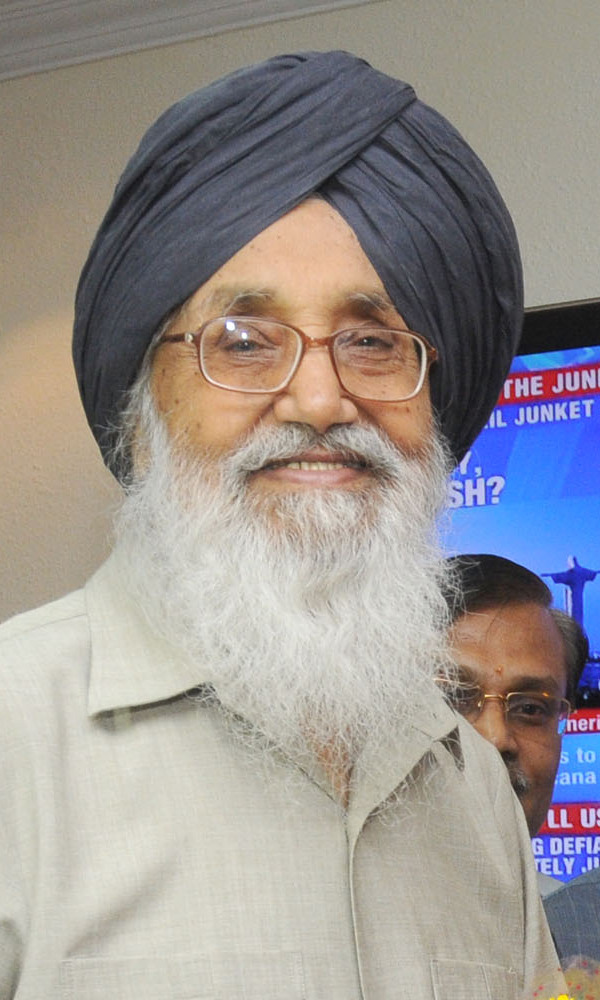
- Badal in 2014

8th Chief Minister of Punjab
- In office 1 March 2007 – 16 March 2017
- Governor: Sunith Francis Rodrigues,Shivraj Patil,Kaptan Singh SolankiV. P. Singh Badnore
- Deputy: Sukhbir Singh Badal (from 2009)
- Preceded by: Amarinder Singh
- Succeeded by: Amarinder Singh
- In office 12 February 1997 – 26 February 2002
- Governor: B. K. N. Chhibber,J. F. R. Jacob
- Preceded by: Rajinder Kaur Bhattal
- Succeeded by: Amarinder Singh
- In office 20 June 1977 – 17 February 1980
- Governor: Mahendra Mohan Choudhry,Ranjit Singh Narula,Jaisukhlal Hathi
- Preceded by: President's rule
- Succeeded by: President's rule
- In office 27 March 1970 – 14 June 1971
- Governor: D. C. Pavate
- Preceded by: Gurnam Singh
- Succeeded by: President's rule

Leader of the Opposition in Punjab Assembly
- In office 2 October 1972 – 30 April 1977
- Preceded by: Jaswinder Singh Brar
- Succeeded by: Balram Jakhar
- In office 7 June 1980 – 7 October 1983
- Preceded by: Balram Jakhar
- Succeeded by: Gurbinder Kaur Brar
- In office 26 February 2002 – 1 March 2007
- Preceded by: Chaudhary Jagjit Singh
- Succeeded by: Rajinder Kaur Bhattal

11th Union Minister of Agriculture and Irrigation, Government of India
- In office 28 March 1977 – 17 June 1977
- Prime Minister: Morarji Desai
- Preceded by: Jagjivan Ram
- Succeeded by: Surjit Singh Barnala

Personal details
- Born: 8 December 1927 Abul Khurana, Punjab Province, British India
- Died: 25 April 2023 (aged 95) Mohali, Punjab, India
- Party: Shiromani Akali Dal
- Other political affiliations: National Democratic Alliance (1998–2020); Akali Dal – Parkash Singh Badal Group (1986-1995); United Akali Dal (1987); Akali Dal – Sant Fateh Singh Group (1962-1968); Indian National Congress (1957)
- Spouse: Surinder Kaur (m. 1959; died 2011)
- Children: 2, including Sukhbir
- Relatives: Badal family, Majithia family, Kairon family
- Profession: Politician

Parkash Singh Badal (8 December 1927 – 25 April 2023) was an Indian politician and Sikh rights advocate who served as the 8th Chief Minister of Punjab from 1970 to 1971, from 1977 to 1980, from 1997 to 2002, and from 2007 to 2017, the longest serving Chief Minister of Punjab till date. He was also Leader of the Opposition in the Punjab Legislative Assembly from 1972 to 1977, 1980 to 1983 and from 2002 to 2007 and the 11th Union Minister of Agriculture and Farmers' Welfare in the Morarji Desai ministry from 1977 to 1977. He was the patron of Shiromani Akali Dal (SAD), a Sikh-centered regional political party, and the president of the party from 1995 to 2008, when he was replaced by his son Sukhbir Singh Badal. As the patron of SAD he exercised a strong influence on the Shiromani Gurdwara Parbandhak Committee and Delhi Sikh Gurdwara Management Committee.

== Early life and family ==
Parkash Singh Badal was born on 8 December 1927 in Abul Khurana, near Malout. He belonged to a Jatt Sikh family of Dhillon Clan, who were generally apolitical and worked in their fields. His father was a landlord named Raghuraj Singh Badal. In 1959, he married Surinder Kaur. The couple had two children, Sukhbir Singh Badal and Parneet Kaur, who is married to Adesh Pratap Singh Kairon. Surinder Kaur died in 2011 after a long illness due to cancer.

His younger brother Gurdas Singh Badal had also been in politics in both, the Shiromani Akali Dal and the Indian National Congress. His nephew Manpreet Singh Badal served as Finance Minister of Punjab.

Badal graduated from the Panjab University and FC College, Lahore and became a member of the Shiromani Gurdwara Parbandhak Committee at a young age. During the Partition of India he was not able to board any train and was left to fend for himself in Lahore, Pakistan. He was later escorted by a party of Indian soldiers as his father requested Brigadier Mohinder Singh Chopra to help him.

== Political career ==
Badal started his political career in 1947. He was Sarpanch of the Village Badal and later chairman of Block Samiti, Lambi before rising into Punjab politics. He was elected to Punjab Vidhan Sabha in 1957 for the first time from the Shiromani Akali Dal political party, when he was hardly thirty years of age. He was re-elected in 1969, serving as Minister for Community Development, Panchayati Raj, Animal Husbandry, Dairying and Fisheries. He was Leader of Opposition in 1972, 1980 and 2002. He had been elected in Vidhan Sabha for a total of 10 times, in 1957 and in each election since 1969, except for the February 1992 election, in which he led a boycott of state elections by the Akalis. In 1997 elections he won from Lambi Assembly constituency and had been a consecutive winner in four terms. He was a union minister in Prime Minister Morarji Desai's government in 1977, serving as Minister of Agriculture and Irrigation.

=== Chief Minister of Punjab ===
Badal served as Punjab Chief Minister for five terms, the first time in 1970 when he became the youngest chief minister of an Indian state. He completed his last term in March 2017.

==== First term (1970-1971) ====
Badal first became Chief Minister of Punjab in March 1970 and headed a coalition government of Akali Dal - Sant Fateh Singh and Jana Sangh. In June 1970 Jana Sangh withdrew support from the Badal government over their difference about the place of Hindi in Punjab. Later, in early July, seven of Akali Dal (Sant) defected to rival Akali Dal headed by ex-CM Gurnam Singh. An early session of the assembly was called on 24 July to prove the majority of Badal's government. However, the motion of no confidence was not admitted due to lack of requisite support of one-fifth of MLAs. Congress decided to stay neutral and did not support the no-confidence motion.

==== Second term (1977-1980) ====
Badal became CM for the term 20 June 1977 to 17 February 1980 with the support and alliance of Janata Party. He led major developments in infrastructure and kept harmony in the state despite the fiery tensions that were running during the Emergency from 1975-1977.

==== Third term (1997–2002) ====
Badal became CM for the term 12 February 1997 to 26 February 2002. He had put a complete end to all human rights violations in Punjab by the Punjab Police- along with the dreaded Black Cats and bounty system.

==== Fourth term (2007–2012) ====
In the 2007 Punjab state election Shiromani Akali Dal-Bharatiya Janata Party coalition government won 67 out of 117 seats and Parkash Singh Badal was sworn in as chief minister for the fourth time. He held 10 portfolios, which included the ministries for Home, Housing & Urban Development, Excise & Taxation, Power, Personnel, General Administration, Vigilance, Employment, Legal & Legislative Affairs and NRIs Affairs. Badal launched many schemes such as free ambulance service, Talwandi Sabo thermal plant, etc. Through a new transportation policy, he reduced taxes on air-conditioned buses, making it less expensive for companies to operate luxury buses. This also increased profits of a bus company owned by his son, Sukhbir Singh Badal, which soared to 1.7 million U.S. dollars.

==== Fifth term (2012–2017) ====
In the 2012 election, Shiromani Akali Dal and Bharatiya Janata Party combined won 68 seats out of 117, despite a tradition of anti-incumbency in Punjab. Badal again became the chief minister of Punjab on 14 March 2012 after being sworn in by the governor of Punjab, Shivraj Patil. He is also the oldest chief minister ever and is the only person who has been both the youngest and the oldest chief minister of his state. In the 2012–2017 government he held the portfolios of Personnel, General Administration, Power, Cooperation, Science Technology, and Environment, Vigilance and Employment Generation.

Badal opposed FDI, and sided with political ally BJP.

=== Detentions, protests and issues ===
==== Detentions ====
When he had become the Chief Minister of Punjab, Parkash Singh Badal had constructed "beautiful jails", with the reasoning that he and his followers visit jails so often that he must make them pleasant to the eye.

Badal was first detained in the Karnal jail in connection with Civil Liberties Agitation later under the Maintenance of Internal Security Act during the Indian Emergency. As the Emergency progressed, conditions in jail became relaxed between prisoners.

He was then imprisoned in 1982 over protesting against the Sutlej Yamuna link canal which would have made the Punjab land barren of water resources.

He was jailed for sedition against the Indian Government in June 1984 when he had asked for Sikh soldiers to mutiny against the Indian Government after Operation Blue Star.

In August 1992, he was again lodged in Tajpur Road Jail from 28 August 1992 to 1 September 1992 for protesting against the false encounters perpetrated by Kanwar Pal Singh Gill.

In December 1992, the then Jathedar of Akal Takht, Gurdev Singh Kaunke, of Jagraon's Kaunke Kalan area, had disappeared after he was arrested by the Punjab Police. Badal staged a protest against police over the disappearance of Jathedar and was arrested and lodged again in Ludhiana jail from 1 to 13 January 1993.

He was under house arrest multiple times from 1984-1995, over 50 times in total as noted by Bhai Ajmer Singh.

==== Janata Party ====
Whilst in jail, Badal began to speak to the other political prisoners about forming an opposition group to Indira Gandhi’s Congress and the idea of the Janata Party was made, a party that works for the people. On 6 February 1976 Badal hosted a lunch for about 409 political detenus which marked the beginning of a dialogue.

In the 1977 elections, the Janata Party came to power with an alliance with the Shiromani Akali Dal, running under a platform of democracy and retaining civil liberties.

Indira Gandhi would lose her home seat of Rae Bareilly to Raj Narain, with the Congress Party not even receiving one seat in states like Punjab, Haryana, Bihar (including Jharkhand), Uttar Pradesh (including Uttarakhand) and Himachal Pradesh.

==== Separatism ====
He was a part of the Dharam-Yudh Morcha and was a close associate of Sant Jarnail Singh Bhindranwale, even attending his Dastarbandi ceremony.

During the Dharam-Yudh Morcha he went undercover and reached the Indian Parliament and had burnt copies of Article 25B of the Indian Constitution over the demand for a separate identity for Sikhs.

In protest of Operation Black Thunder which was approved by Chief Minister of Punjab Surjit Singh Barnala, 27 Shiromani Akali Dal MLAs led by Parkash Singh Badal and Captain Amarinder Singh split from the mainstream Shiromani Akali Dal and formed Akali Dal – Parkash Singh Badal Group in 1986.

He was a part of the United Akali Dal, which supported Khalistan. He was contesting alongside politicians like Simranjit Singh Mann, Baba Joginder Singh Rode (father of Jarnail Singh Bhindranwale) and Captain Amarinder Singh.

Badal had said that the militants of the Damdami Taksal and other terrorist outfits were "engaged in a struggle of the Panth". During the Khalistan Movement he had shifted to political protests and armed insurrection; he stated, "Barnala is a traitor. He is a tyrant worse than the Moghuls. Even Mrs Gandhi's despotic regime pales before his misdeeds. At the behest of the Centre, he is finishing the Sikh youth and attacking the Sikh holy shrines. Neither God nor Sikhs shall pardon him. The Delhi Darbar is out to finish the Sikhs. We must fight back. I shall go to each Sikh youth's house killed by the security forces, visit Sikhs detained in jails. We shall do everything possible to stop the massacre of Sikh youth."

He had protection from the Khalistan Commando Force in 1992 as various militants saw him as an ally; he used to go to various Bhog ceremonies of militants as well.

On the militants' orders he had boycotted the 1992 Punjab elections, no one from his party had contested and the only ones participating were the Indian National Congress, Shiromani Akali Dal (Kabul) and Bhartiya Janata Party, and even those only in Hindu rural or Urban areas, as the candidates feared the militant's gun. Only 25 percent of the population voted due to the boycott and insurgency.

In 1993 Badal had signed the memorandum submitted to the United Nations, demanding Khalistan, which also carried Tohra's signature. The memorandum stated, "Like all free people of the world, the Sikh nation, in accordance with the UN declaration on granting of independence to colonial countries and peoples, seeks an independent and sovereign state to break the shackles of apartheid, slavery, colonialism and a retrograde political system and structure."

He publicly shed his separatist ideologue in 1998.

==== Protests ====
In the 1950s till the late 1960s he provided the Punjabi Suba Movement's protestors with food and resources to continue their movement against the Indian Government. He also joined the protests.

He protested and was joined when protesting against the Indian Emergency against Indira Gandhi.

When he was the chief minister in 2015, demanded the premature release of 13 Sikhs, including assassins of former Punjab chief minister Beant Singh although was not able to.

Throughout his career he tried his best to make a widespread issue over the Dharmi Faujis not receiving their pensions, although the Sikh population did not take notice and overlooked or dismissed the issue completely.

Ever since the Sutlej-Yamuna Link (SYL) issue came up in 1982, Punjab Chief Minister Parkash Singh Badal has been vocal in disapproving it and leading from the front in safeguarding the rights of Punjab's farmers. He believed that successive Congress governments at the Centre have been doing "grave injustice" to the state forcing Punjab to share the water in the name of SYL Canal. Under his leadership, Punjab government took a path-breaking decision of adopting the Punjab Sutlej Yamuna Link Canal (Transfer of Proprietary Rights) Bill, 2016 in the assembly. With this decision taken on 14 March 2016, the process of denotifying (and dismantling) the 121-km long Sutlej Yamuna Link Canal that was constructed in Punjab to carry water to Haryana has begun. Parkash Singh Badal has expressed candidly many times that Punjab does not have a single drop of spare water for anybody and Akali Dal is opposed to the agreement which it believed would rob the water of the state. Chief Minister Badal, in his latest move, has sent a cheque of Rs.390 crore back to Haryana Chief Minister Manohar Lal Khattar received from Haryana nearly four decades back.

Badal returned the second-highest civilian award, the Padma Vibhushan award to support the 2020–2021 Indian farmers' protest on 3 December 2020.

==== Issues ====
Parkash Singh Badal along with his wife Surinder Kaur, son Sukhbir Singh and seven others were booked under various provisions of the Prevention of Corruption Act in 2003. After a seven-year-long case all accused were acquitted by a local court in Mohali in 2010 due to a lack of incriminating evidence.

In May 2016, the Aam Aadmi Party had surrounded Parkash Singh Badal's house on the issue of farmer suicides and an alleged Rs 12,000-crore wheat scam, Badal, who was the chief minister then, emerged from his home with folded hands. To everyone's surprise, Badal invited them to discuss things over lunch, although the rivalry continued they stopped protests at his residence.

== Death ==
Badal died on 25 April 2023, aged 95, after a brief illness at Fortis hospital in Mohali, Punjab.

== Awards ==
=== Panth Rattan ===
On 11 December 2011, Badal was bestowed upon the title of Panth Rattan Fakhr-e-Qaum (literally "Jewel of the religion, pride of the community") by the Akal Takht. He was awarded this title at Golden Temple complex in the presence of Jathedars of all five Takhts in the form of a "siropa" (robe of honour), a sword and a silver plaque with inscription of the citation of Panth Rattan Fakhr-e-Qaum. Badal was awarded this title for his service towards the Sikh Panth by creating many memorials pertaining to Sikhism such as Virasat-e-Khalsa, besides being imprisoned for long time and having faced atrocities during various movements.

Former SGPC secretary general Manjit Singh Calcutta argued that the award is given posthumously. In response, Akal Takht Jathedar Giani Gurbachan Singh cited the example of Master Tara Singh, who was given the award during his lifetime.

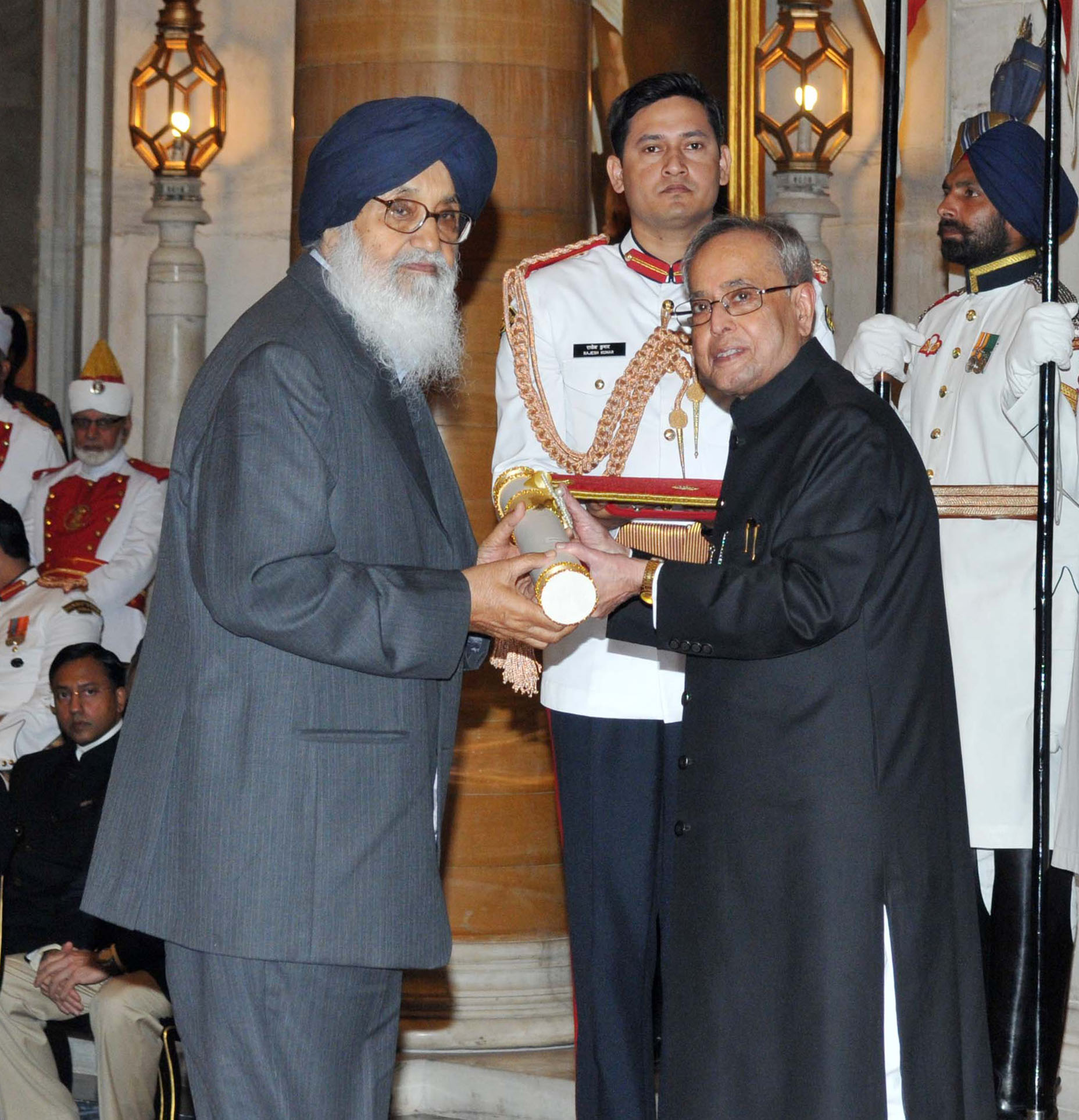
Parkash Singh Badal (left) receiving Padma Vibhushan award from President of India Pranab Mukherjee (right) on 30 March 2015.

=== Padma Vibhushan ===
He was given the Padma Vibhushan due to his contributions toward politics, agriculture, infrastructure and service to India by the Indian Government headed by Narendra Modi in March 2015.

== Electoral performance ==
He lost the 1967 and 2022 assembly elections and won election 11 times to the assembly (one time from Malout, five times from Godderbaha, and fives times from Lambi) and one time in the Lok Sabha elections.

Punjab Assembly election, 1957
Party	Candidate	Votes	%	±%
INC	Parkash Singh Badal	39,255		
Independent	Ujjagar Singh	13,571		
Majority				
INC gain from				

Punjab Assembly election, 1967: Giddarbaha
Party	Candidate	Votes	%	±%
INC	Harcharan Singh Brar	21,692		
SAD	Parkash Singh Badal	21,635		

Punjab Assembly election, 1969: Giddarbaha
Party	Candidate	Votes	%	±%
SAD	Parkash Singh Badal	30,625		
INC	Mohinder Singh	19,418		

Punjab Assembly election, 1972: Giddarbaha
Party	Candidate	Votes	%	±%
SAD	Parkash Singh Badal	30,557		
INC	Mohinder Singh	21,246		

1977 Indian general election: Faridkot
Party	Candidate	Votes	%	±%
SAD	Parkash Singh	282,713	59.20	New entry
INC	Avtar Singh	182,012	38.11	New entry
Independent	Jeeta Ram	9,889	2.07	Steady
Independent	Hari Chand	2,933	0.61	Steady
Majority		100,701	21.09	New entry
Turnout		487,098	75.39	New entry
SAD win (new seat)				

Punjab Assembly election, 1985: Giddarbaha
Party	Candidate	Votes	%	±%
SAD	Parkash Singh Badal	36,438	54.6%	
INC	Jagmeet Singh	27,173	40.7%	

Punjab Assembly election, 1997: Qila Raipur
Party	Candidate	Votes	%	±%
SAD	Parkash Singh Badal	38,532	44.74	New entry
CPI(M)	Tarsem Jodhan	27,500	31.93	▼14.61
SAD(A)	Simranjit Singh Mann	15,377	17.85	
INC	Jagdev Singh Jassowal	4,716	5.48	▼22.24
Majority		11,032	12.81	▼6.01
Turnout		86,125	71.54	▲67.70
Registered electors		120,385		
SAD gain from CPI(M)		Swing	13.41	

Punjab Assembly election, 2002: Lambi
Party	Candidate	Votes	%	±%
SAD	Parkash Singh Badal	50,545	54.2	−3.1
Independent	Maheshinder Singh	26,616	28.6	
INC	Gurnam Singh	12,800	13.7	−12.5
BSP	Parveen Kumari Bagri	2,068	2.2	−13.1
Majority		93,233	25.7	−5.0
Turnout		130,612	71.4	−4.4
SAD hold		Swing		

Punjab Assembly election, 2007: Lambi
Party	Candidate	Votes	%	±%
SAD	Parkash Singh Badal	56,282	51.4	−2.8
INC	Maheshinder Singh	47,095	43	+29.3
BSP	Harnek Singh	2,252	2.1	−11.6
SP	Raju Kumar	1,223	1.1	
Majority		109,608	8.4	−17.3
Turnout		125,606	87.3	+15.9
SAD hold		Swing		

Punjab Assembly election, 2012: Lambi
Party	Candidate	Votes	%	±%
SAD	Parkash Singh Badal	67,999	55.71	
INC	Maheshinder Singh	43,260	35.44	
PPoP	Gurdas Singh Badal	5,352	4.38	
BSP	Parveen Kumari	1,773	1.45	
IND.	Puran Singh	1,239	1.02	
Majority		24,739	20.27	
Turnout		1,22,174	87.23	
SAD hold		Swing		

Punjab Assembly election, 2017: Lambi
Party	Candidate	Votes	%	±%
SAD	Parkash Singh Badal	66,375	49.54	−6.17
INC	Capt. Amarinder Singh	43,605	32.54	−2.9
AAP	Jarnail Singh	21,254	15.86	−
NOTA	None of the above	1,101	0.82	−
PLP	Gurmeet Singh Ranghreta	730	0.54	+0.25
Majority		22,770	17.00	−3.27
Turnout		1,34,089	85.77	−1.46
Registered electors				
SAD hold		Swing	-6.17	

Punjab Assembly election, 2022: Lambi
Party	Candidate	Votes	%	±%
AAP	Gurmeet Singh Khuddian	66,313	48.87	▲32.88
SAD	Parkash Singh Badal	54,917	40.47	▼9.48
INC	Jagpal Singh Abul Khurana	10,136	7.47	▼32.81
SAD(A)	Jaswinder Singh	1,318	0.97	▲0.57
NOTA	None of the above	1,226	0.9	▲0.07
BJP	Rakesh Dhingra	1,116	0.82	New
Majority		11,396	8.4	▼8.74
Turnout		135,697		
Registered electors		165,825		
AAP gain from SAD		Swing		

== See also ==
- Bathinda
- Prakash Singh Badal ministry (1977–1980)
- Simranjit Singh Mann

Lok Sabha
Preceded by Kartar Singh Kalra	Member of Parliament for Faridkot; 1971–1977	Succeeded by Gurbrinder Kaur Brar
Political offices
Preceded by Gurnam Singh	Chief Minister of Punjab; 27 March 1970 – 14 June 1971	Succeeded by President's rule
Preceded by Jagjivan Ram	Minister of Agriculture; 24 March 1977 – 20 June 1977	Succeeded by Surjit Singh Barnala
Preceded by President's rule	Chief Minister of Punjab; 20 June 1977 – 17 February 1980	Succeeded by President's rule
Preceded by Rajinder Kaur Bhattal	Chief Minister of Punjab; 12 February 1997 – 26 February 2002	Succeeded by Amarinder Singh
Preceded by Amarinder Singh	Chief Minister of Punjab; 1 March 2007 – 11 March 2017	Succeeded by Amarinder Singh

Lok Sabha
Preceded by Kartar Singh Kalra	Member of Parliament for Faridkot; 1971–1977	Succeeded by Gurbrinder Kaur Brar
Political offices
Preceded by Gurnam Singh	Chief Minister of Punjab; 27 March 1970 – 14 June 1971	Succeeded by President's rule
Preceded by Jagjivan Ram	Minister of Agriculture; 24 March 1977 – 20 June 1977	Succeeded by Surjit Singh Barnala
Preceded by President's rule	Chief Minister of Punjab; 20 June 1977 – 17 February 1980	Succeeded by President's rule
Preceded by Rajinder Kaur Bhattal	Chief Minister of Punjab; 12 February 1997 – 26 February 2002	Succeeded by Amarinder Singh
Preceded by Amarinder Singh	Chief Minister of Punjab; 1 March 2007 – 11 March 2017	Succeeded by Amarinder Singh
