= 4th Punjab Assembly =

Law governing body of Punjab

Fourth Punjab Legislative Assembly
- Punjab Legislative Assembly

Type
- Type: Unicameral

History
- Founded: 20 March 1967
- Disbanded: 28 August 1968
- Preceded by: Third Punjab Legislative Assembly
- Succeeded by: Fifth Punjab Legislative Assembly

Leadership
- Speaker: Joginder Singh Mann
- Deputy Speaker: Jagjit Singh Chauhan (1967)
- Baldev Singh (1967-1968)
- Leader of House (Chief Minister): Gurnam Singh (1967)
- Lachhman Singh Gill (1967-1968)
- Leader of the Opposition: Gian Singh Rarewala (1967)
- Gurnam Singh (1967-1968)

Structure
- Seats: 104
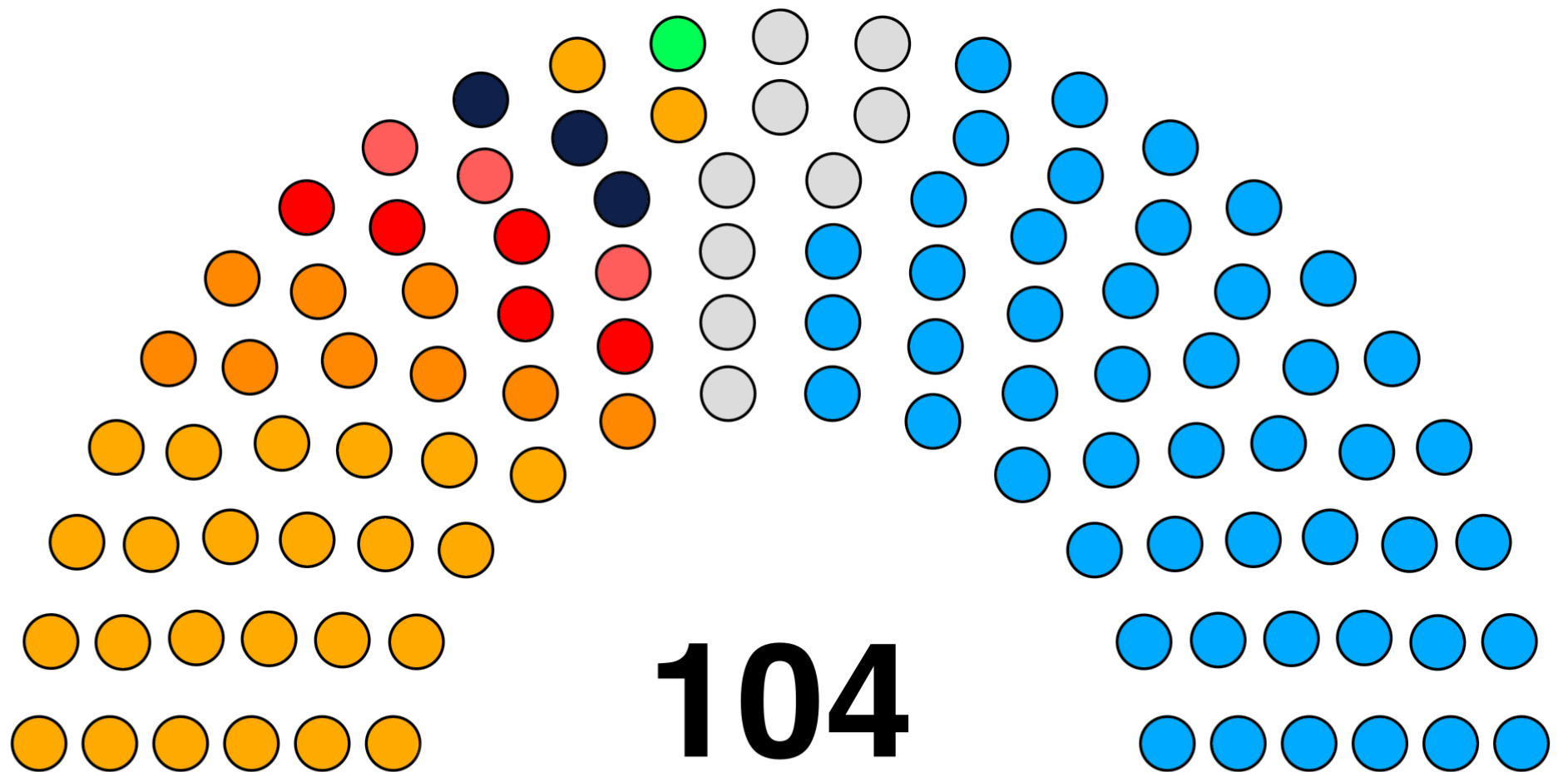
- Political groups: Mar. 1967-Nov. 1967; Government (53) (Note: The given members of parties were at the time of the formation of the Government. The numbers changed later on due to defections, resignations, mergers or splits): PUF (53); ADS (24); BJS (9); CPI (5); CPIM (3); RPI (3); ADM (2); SPI (1); IND (6); Opposition (51): INC (48); Ind (3)
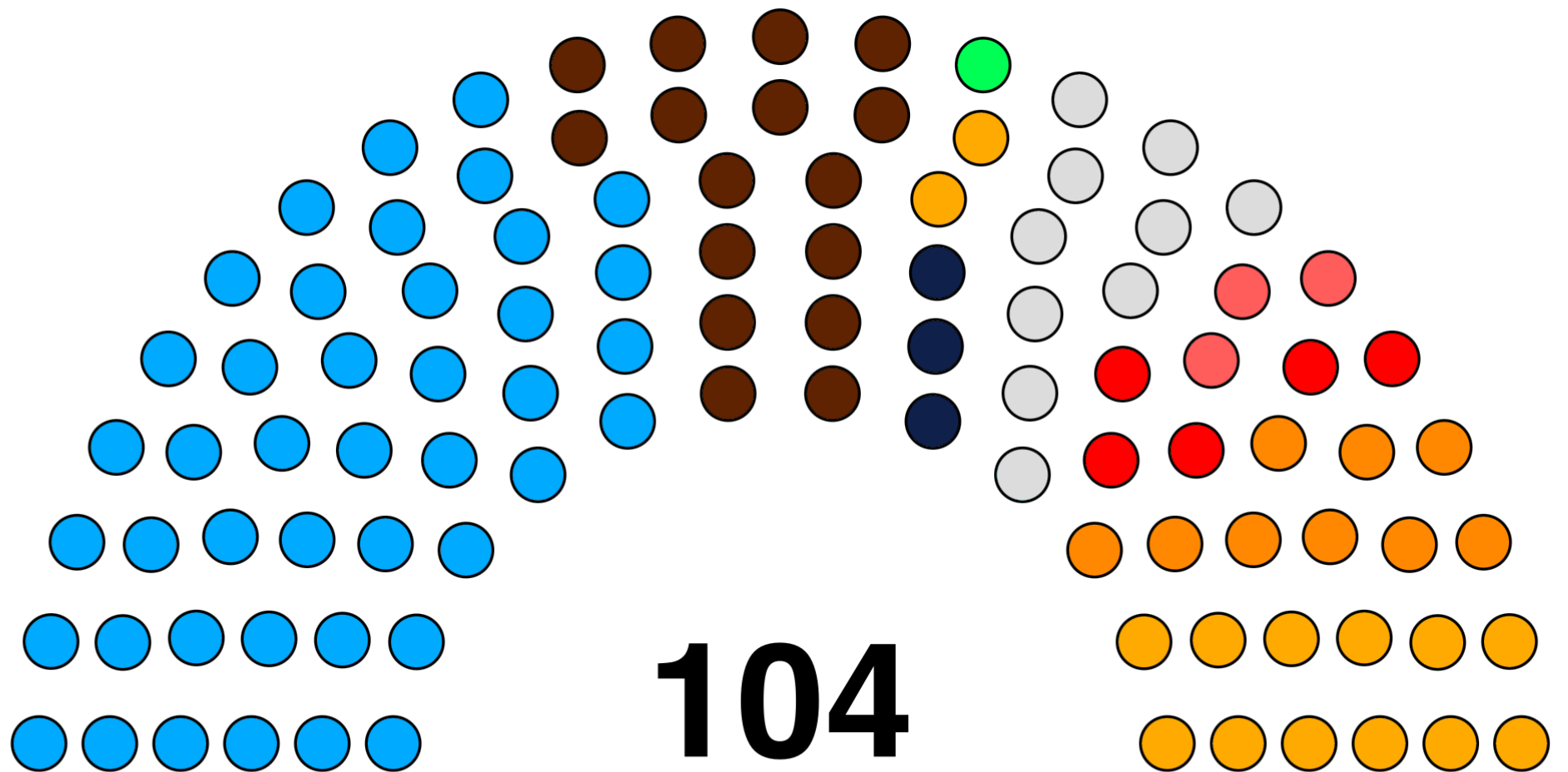
- Political groups: Nov. 1967-Aug. 1968; Government (66): INC (43); PJP (16); RPI (3); ADM (2); SPI (1); IND (1) (Note: The Independent was Harcharan Singh Hudiara who, on 26 May 1967, formed his new political outfit named Akali Dal (Hudiara)); Opposition (38): ADS (12); BJS (9); CPI (5); CPIM (3); IND (9)
- Length of term: 1967-1969

Elections
- Voting system: first-past-the-post
- Last election: 1967
- Next election: 1969

The 1967 Punjab Legislative Assembly election was the Fourth Vidhan Sabha (Legislative Assembly) election of the state. This was the first hung assembly. Indian National Congress emerged as the largest party with 48 seats in the 104-seat legislature in the election. The Akali Dal - Sant Fateh Singh became the second, holding 24 seats. On 28 August 1968, Assembly dissolved prematurely and president rule was imposed. (Note: President's rule may be imposed when the "government in a state is not able to function as per the Constitution", which often happens because no party or coalition has a majority in the assembly. When President's rule is in force in a state, its council of ministers stands dissolved. The office of chief minister thus lies vacant, and the administration is taken over by the governor, who functions on behalf of the central government. At times, the legislative assembly also stands dissolved.)

== History ==
Fourth General election of Punjab Legislative Assembly resulted in hung assembly. With 48 seats Congress was the largest party but short of 5 seats to form Government. By winning five legislators from among Independents, Congress could have easily formed a stable Government. With the defeat of its leader Giani Gurmukh Singh Musafir, there was a search for new leadership among the elected Congress. Soon after the elections, two parallel moves were initiated from the Congress for the formation of ministry in Punjab. The supporters of one group led by Swaran Singh sent out feelers to the Akali Dal - Sant Fateh Singh Group for the Congress-Akali Coalition ministry; the other move was initiated by Darbara Singh to bring the Maharaja of Patiala Yadavindra Singh and his group into the Congress fold with the Chief Ministership as a bait. The Congress Parliamentary Board had already decided that neither an outsider was to be elected as Party leader nor was the congress to form the coalition ministry with the help of other Parties. So the moves proved futile.

== United Front government ==
14 March 1967 "People's United Front" a combination of all opposition parties and six Independents was formed at a convention at Khanna. The Front claimed the majority in the state legislature. Gurnam Singh, a retired Judge of High Court, was elected as its leader. As a leader of the Front. Gurnam Singh called on the Governor and pressed his claim to form a government. The people United front formed its ministry on 8 March 1967.

Upheavals

On 5 April 1967 the United front government suffered defeat in the state vidhan sabha when the amendment to the motion of thanks to the Governor moved by the leader of the Congress opposition was adopted. The amendment sought to regret the omission in the Governor's address of the assurance to the use of Punjabi language up to the secretariat level. Amendment was carried out by 53 votes to 49 in a 104-member house, including the speaker. It was than expected that either the United Front would quit office or seek vote of confidence in the house. The opposition made and uproarious demand for the resignation of the United front ministry, failing which, the dismissal of the ministry. Gurnam Singh vigorously contended that the acceptance of the opposition amendment did not amount to rejection of any of the policies of the government. He held the view that the government was more genuinely interested in the adoption of Punjabi more than the Congress Party.

Congress party continuously tried to topple the Front's Government. However, a set back for Congress on 4 May 1967, 3 Congress legislators defected to Akali Dal - Sant Fateh Singh Group and 2 more joined Front on 9 May 1967.

No-confidence motion

On 25 May 1967 a No-confidence motion against the United front Minister was admitted. Lachhman Singh Gill charged the Congress and state vidhan sabha with using 'corrupt methods' to manoeuvre defections and alleged that that Congress had spent rupees one lakh in just 8 days to purchase members. On the next day the United front government won over the confidence of the house by securing 57 votes in favour and 46 against and the house was adjourned sine die. On the same day, Harcharan Singh Hudiara announced the formation of Akali Dal. This became the third Akali Dal in the state, the other two having been led by Sant Fateh Singh and master Tara Singh. The formation of the third Akali Dal and the eclipse of Sant Fateh Singh by the Rebel leader Harcharan Singh Hundiara, was reminiscent of the Sant's own ouster to Tara Singh.

Fall of Government

On 22 November 1967 before the Punjab Legislative Assembly met for its winter session Lachhman Singh Gill revolted and defected along with 16 legislators from the United Front and formed new party named Punjab Janta Party. On the same day, Sant Fateh Singh, the president of the Akali Dal rushed to Chandigarh in a bid to bring about a rapprochement between Gurnam Singh and Lachhman Singh but did not succeed in his efforts. Ultimately, on the same day Gurnam Singh tender the resignation of his ministry. Governor accepted the resignation but ask the Gurnam Singh to continue in office till and alternative arrangements was made. After 3 days, Lachhman Singh Gill formed new Government.

== Janta-Congress government ==
When Gurnam Singh submitted his resignation to Governor, he advised him to dissolve the Assembly but Governor rejected the advice. Lachhman Singh Gill's Punjab Janta Party formed his Government with Congress and other parties on 25 November 1967.

Conflicts

Within less than a month of Gill Ministry coming to power, discontentment in Congress ranks came to the surface. The ten Dalit legislators of Congress were discontented because their counterparts, all the three legislators of the Republican Party of India were able to secure berths in the Ministry.

On 6 March 1968, a motion of no-confidence was admitted against Speaker Joginder Singh Mann (Akali Dal - Tara Singh) in the house. The motion was backed by 56 members. The Congress and the Janta members voted for admission. The motion expressed lack of confidence in the Speaker for his failure to maintain dignity and decorum of the House and for his failure in getting his order enforced.

== Constitutional crisis ==
The no-confidence motion against Speaker failed to stand as the prior condition under Article 179(c) of Indian Constitution not fulfilled as the objection raised by leader of opposition Gurnam Singh. Thus, the removal of Speaker failed and Speaker adjourned the Assembly for two months and this cause serious Constitutional crisis as it was the Budget Session of the Assembly and budget had got to be passed.

The crisis was solved by the interference of the Governor of Punjab and Supreme Court of India. But this already cause a damage on the relationship of Punjab Janta Party and Indian National Congress, the main coalition partner in Government.

== Upheavals ==
The Congress party was a faction ride party. Of the two dissident factions, one was led by Gian Singh Rarewala, leader of Congress Legislative Party, and the other was led by Mohan Singh. The feud became sharpened between the two on the question of withdrawing the support from Gill Government. Rarewala group was in favour of withdrawing the support and persuaded the Congress High Command to do the same. While, Mohan Singh faction sought the intervention of High Command to compel the Rarewala group to get their plan approved by the whole party. Zail Singh, the Punjab Pradesh Congress Committee chief made lone efforts to restore the solidarity in the Party.

Gill didn't lag behind in the manoeuvres. He created a split in the Congress, by using the threat of dissolution of the state assembly and was able to rally support for himself. Gill in order to keep throne intact, also held discussions with Congress High Command and suggested three alternatives, namely:-

- The Congress should continue its support to his ministry till November 1968 in order to provide him with ammunition to fight the Akali Dal – Sant Fateh Singh Group in the forthcoming Shiromani Gurdwara Prabandhak Committee elections.
- He was prepared to join Congress Party with prior condition that as the Leader of Congress Legislative Party, he should be re-elected and
- He was even prepared to quit and was prepared to support a Congress Ministry, along with his Party colleagues.

However, none of the alternatives was acceptable to the central leadership.

== Dissolution of Assembly ==
The month of August proved fatal for the Gill ministry. On 11 August 1968, Pro Gill faction held a closed-door meeting. They decided to sponsor a resolution in the forthcoming Congress assembly party through which it was claimed, that an appeal would be made to Independent and the other legislators of the Gill group to join the Congress and also decided to request the central Congress leaders not to withdraw support to the Gill ministry till the next meeting of the Punjab Congress legislative party.

On the following day a meeting of the Congress parliamentary board was held. After the meeting of the Congress Working Committee the consensus at the meeting emerged in favour of withdrawal of the Congress support to Gill Ministry. However, a decision on the timing and the mode of the bringing about such a withdrawal was left to Indira Gandhi and S. Nijalingappa the Prime Minister and the Congress Party President respectively.

The Congress High Command also rejected the Punjab Congress leader's plea for forming an alternative Congress ministry in the State of Punjab with the support of eleven non-Congress legislators, which were purported to be prepared to join Congress unconditionally. The High Command, was not in favour of forming a Congress Ministry with the support of defectors, as this would have brought an odium for which the Central leadership was unprepared.

On 21 August, Brish Bhan, the Deputy leader of the Punjab Congress Legislature Party informed Gill of the withdrawal of the Congress support to the Ministry. At 9:30 a.m. Brish Bhan, called Governor of Punjab and handed over to him the letter intimating the withdrawal of Congress support to the Ministry and requested the Governor to ask for Gill's resignation or dismiss hin in the event of his failure to quit office.

The Chief Minister called on the Governor at 12:30 p.m. and tendered the resignation of his Ministry. In his brief resignation letter Gill said:

I have read in newspaper that the Congress Parliamentary Board had decided to withdraw the support of the Congress from my Ministry. This reduces the majority of my Party in legislature. Since I no longer command the majority in the legislature. I hereby tender my resignation and that of my Council of Ministers.

As no other factions or Parties were in position to form Government in Punjab, on 23 August 1968, President's rule was imposed in Punjab and State Assembly was dissolved.
