= 1967 Punjab Legislative Assembly election =

1967 Punjab Legislative Assembly Election
- 1967

All 104 seats in the Punjab Legislative Assembly, 53 seats needed for a majority
- Turnout: 71.18%
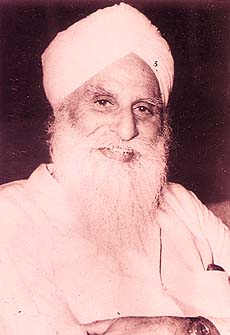

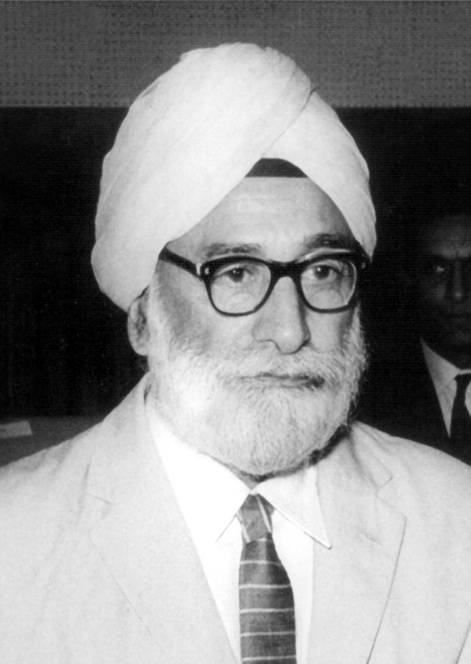

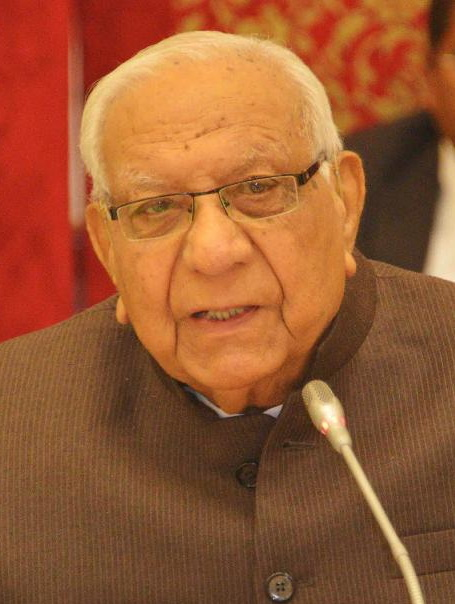
	First party	Second party	Third party
Leader	Giani Gurmukh Singh Mussafir	Gurnam Singh	Balram Das Tandon
Party	INC	Akali Dal (SFS)	ABJS
Leader's seat	Amritsar West (lost)	Qila Raipur (won)	Amritsar Central (won)
Last election	90	New	8
Seats won	48	24	9
Seat change	▼42	▲24	▲1
Popular vote	1,594,160	871,742	418,921
Percentage	37.45%	20.48%	9.84%
Swing	▼6.27%	▲20.48%	▲0.12%
CM before election
Gurmukh Singh
INC
Elected CM
Gurnam Singh
AD(SFS)

Elections to the Punjab Legislative Assembly were held in 1967, to elect members of the 104 constituencies in Punjab, India. It resulted in a hung Assembly with the Indian National Congress as the largest party with 48 seats.

1968 Indian Punjab political crisis

== Voter statistics ==
Title	MEN	WOMEN	TOTAL
No. of electors	3406064	2904999	6311063
No. of electors who voted	2502570	1989796	4492366
Polling percentage	73.47%	68.50%	71.18%

S.No.	Title	Data
1.	No. of valid votes	24468090
2.	No. of votes rejected	1391425
3.	No. of polling stations	6866
4.	Average no. of electors per polling station	919
5.	Men contestants	594
6.	Women contestants	8
7.	Total contestants	602
8.	Elected men	102
9.	Elected women	2

== Political parties ==
=== List of participating political parties in Punjab assembly election in 1967 ===
S. No.	Party abbreviation	Party
National Parties
1.	INC	Indian National Congress
2	CPI	Communist Party Of India
3	CPM	Communist Party Of India (Marxist)
4.	BJS	Bharatiya Jan Sangh
5	PSP	Praja Socialist Party
6	RPI	Republic Party of India
7	SSP	Sanghata Socialist Party
8	SWA	Swatantra Party
State Parties
9	ADM	Akali Dal Master Tara Singh Group
10	ADS	Akali Dal Sant Fateh Singh Group
Independents
11	IND	Independents

== Results ==
Party (Note: Parties in green box formed a coalition government)	Contested	Seats won	Change in seats	Popular vote	%
Akali Dal - Sant Fateh Singh Group	59	24	▲24	8,71,742	20.48
Bharatiya Jana Sangh	49	9	▲1	4,18,921	9.84%
Communist Party of India	19	5	▼4	2,21,494	5.20%
Communist Party of India (Marxist)	13	3	▲3	1,38,857	3.26%
Republican Party of India	17	3	▲3	76,089	1.79%
Akali Dal - Master Tara Singh Group	61	2	▲2	1,78,746	4.20%
Socialist Party	8	1	▼3	30,591	0.72%
Independents	235	9	▼9	6,83,369	16.05%
Indian National Congress	102	48	▼42	15,94,160	37.45%
Others	19	0		43,144	1.02%
Total	602	104		42,57,113	

== Results by constituency ==
Constituency			Winner			Runner Up			Margin
No.	Name	Category	Candidate	Party	Votes	Candidate	Party	Votes	Margin
1	Muktsar	(SC)	Guruev Singh	Akali Dal (SFS)	18028	Matu Ram	INC	15939	2089
2	Gidderbaha	GEN	Harcharan Singh Brar	INC	21692	Parkash Singh Badal	Akali Dal (SFS)	21635	57
3	Malout	GEN	Gurmit Singh	INC	13046	Pritam Singh	Akali Dal (SFS)	11562	1484
4	Lambi	(SC)	S. Chand	INC	11982	Dana Ram	CPI	8327	3655
5	Abohar	GEN	Satya Dev	ABJS	21724	Chandi Ram	INC	15029	6695
6	Fazilka	GEN	Radha Krishan	INC	20048	Aad Lal	ABJS	13011	7037
7	Jalalabad	GEN	Prem Singh	CPI	20046	Lajinder Singh	INC	19378	668
8	Guru Har Sahai	GEN	B. Singh	Independent	15361	Daulat Rai	INC	14189	1172
9	Firozpur	GEN	Gardhara Singh	INC	15419	Balmukand	ABJS	9029	6390
10	Firozpur Cantonment	GEN	M. Singh	INC	12127	R. Singh	Akali Dal (SFS)	10560	1567
11	Zira	GEN	Harcharan Singh	Akali Dal (SFS)	21494	Metab Singh	INC	20622	872
12	Dharamkot	GEN	Lachhman Singh Gill	Akali Dal (SFS)	15204	R. Singh	INC	16733	5901
13	Nihal Singh Wala	(SC)	Munsha Singh	CPI	15204	Saggar Singh	INC	10720	4484
14	Moga	GEN	Nachhatar Singh	INC	16847	Roop Lal	SSP	11433	5414
15	Bhagha Purana	GEN	C. Singh	Akali Dal (SFS)	22170	C. Singh	INC	17027	5143
16	Khadoor Sahib	GEN	Jathedar Mohan Singh Nagoke	INC	22443	A. Singh	Akali Dal (SFS)	21565	878
17	Patti	GEN	R. Kaur	INC	26273	Jaswant Singh	Independent	13677	12596
18	Valtoha	GEN	H. Singh	Akali Dal (SFS)	21249	U. Singh	INC	15985	5264
19	Attari	(SC)	S. Singh	INC	15844	Darshan Singh	CPI(M)	11624	4220
20	Tarn Taran	GEN	H. Singh	Akali Dal (SFS)	24496	N.S.S. Puri	INC	20610	3886
By Polls in 1967	Tarn Taran	GEN	Manjinder Singh	SAD	30081	Dilbag Singh	INC	15880	14201
21	Beas	GEN	S. Singh	INC	20401	K. Singh	Independent	12148	8253
22	Jandiala	(SC)	A. Singh	INC	16005	Tara Singh	Akali Dal (SFS)	12499	3506
23	Amritsar East	GEN	Dr. Baldev Prakash	ABJS	19750	I. Nath	INC	15124	4626
24	Amritsar South	GEN	Harbans Lal Khanna	ABJS	17023	Kirpal Singh	SSP	16320	703
25	Amritsar Central	GEN	Balram Das Tandon	ABJS	22404	J.I. Singh	INC	13256	9148
26	Amritsar West	GEN	Satya Pal Dang	CPI	23339	G.G.S. Mussafir	INC	13368	9971
27	Verka	(SC)	K. Singh	Akali Dal (SFS)	14940	G. Singh	INC	13354	1586
28	Majitha	GEN	Parkash Singh Majitha	SWA	28002	Parkash Kaur	INC	18584	9418
29	Ajnala	GEN	Dalip Singh	CPI(M)	20932	I. Singh	INC	12385	8547
30	Fatehgarh Sahib	GEN	N. Singh	Akali Dal (SFS)	18570	J. Singh	INC	17081	1489
31	Batala	GEN	Mohan Lal	INC	18528	Rattan Lal	ABJS	13722	4806
32	Sri Hargobindpur	GEN	Satnam Singh	INC	15278	Karam Singh	Akali Dal (SFS)	11722	3556
33	Qadian	GEN	S. Singh	INC	18126	B. Singh	CPI	6748	
34	Dhariwal	GEN	S. Singh	INC	15067	U. Singh	Independent	10752	
35	Gurdaspur	GEN	P. Chandra	INC	16741	M. Singh	Akali Dal (SFS)	13546	
36	Dina Nagar	(SC)	J. Muni	INC	13464	S. Pal	ABJS	12309	
37	Narot Mehra	(SC)	S. Singh	INC	16452	R. Chand	ABJS	13764	
38	Pathankot	GEN	C. Ram	ABJS	18142	B. Lal	INC	14958	
39	Balachaur	GEN	B. Ram	INC	20687	D. Chand	Independent	19466	
40	Garhshankar	GEN	Capt. R. Singh	INC	20412	D. Singh	CPI	13478	
41	Mahilpur	(SC)	G. Singh	INC	18973	K. Singh	Akali Dal (MTS)	10477	
42	Hoshiarpur	GEN	B. Singh	SSP	16027	Balkrishan	INC	12669	
43	Sham Chaurasi	(SC)	G. Dass	INC	14656	Devraj	CPI(M)	11241	
44	Tanda	GEN	J. Singh	RPI	11969	A. Singh	INC	10697	
45	Dasuya	GEN	R.P. Dass	Independent	15539	D. Singh	Independent	11958	
46	Mukerian	GEN	B. Nath	Independent	17451	R. Ram	INC	12382	
47	Kapurthala	GEN	K. Singh	INC	18976	B.H. Singh	Independent	12083	
48	Sultanpur	GEN	B. Singh	INC	17743	A. Singh	Akali Dal (MTS)	15211	
49	Phagwara	(SC)	S. Ram	INC	14943	G. Ram	Independent	11547	
50	Jullundur North	GEN	L.C. Suberwal	ABJS	19613	G. Saini	INC	15374	
51	Jullundur South	GEN	Manmohan	ABJS	19138	Yashpal	INC	14222	
52	Jullundur Cantonment	GEN	R. Singh	Independent	11763	B. Raj	Independent	9473	
53	Adampur	GEN	D. Singh	INC	17485	K. Singh	CPI	16989	
54	Kartarpur	(SC)	P. Ram	RPI	18708	G. Singh	INC	16000	
55	Jamsher	(SC)	D. Singh	INC	11808	M. Singh	Independent	9185	
56	Nakodar	GEN	D. Singh	Independent	11755	U. Singh	INC	8437	
57	Nur Mahal	GEN	D. Singh	INC	23230	T. Singh	CPI	16451	
58	Bara Pind	GEN	H.S. Surjit	CPI(M)	18078	P. Singh	INC	15946	
59	Banga	(SC)	H. Ram	Akali Dal (SFS)	16368	J. Ram	INC	15293	
60	Nawanshahr	GEN	D. Singh	INC	22048	H. Singh	Akali Dal (SFS)	14094	
61	Phillaur	GEN	A. Singh	INC	17267	G. Singh	CPI(M)	9510	
62	Jagraon	GEN	G. Singh	INC	20660	D. Singh	Akali Dal (SFS)	18173	
63	Raikot	GEN	Jathedar Jagdev Singh Talwandi	Akali Dal (SFS)	28912	S. Singh	INC	16947	
64	Qila Raipur	GEN	G. Singh	Akali Dal (SFS)	25488	A. Singh	INC	20034	
65	Dakha	(SC)	J. Singh	INC	18060	B. Singh	Akali Dal (SFS)	16903	
66	Ludhiana North	GEN	K. Chand	ABJS	22785	T. Dass	INC	12055	
67	Ludhiana South	GEN	V.A. Vishwanath	ABJS	14482	J. Pall	INC	11194	
68	Kum Kalan	GEN	G.M. Singh	INC	17655	M. Singh	Akali Dal (SFS)	16921	
69	Payal	GEN	G. Singh	INC	24505	B. Singh	Akali Dal (SFS)	20027	
70	Khanna	(SC)	G. Singh	RPI	16617	B. Singh	INC	12371	
71	Samrala	GEN	J. Singh	Akali Dal (SFS)	27719	A. Singh	INC	20320	
72	Nangal	GEN	S. Parasher	INC	10733	B. Singh	ABJS	7737	
73	Anandpur	GEN	J. Singh	INC	12016	S. Singh	Akali Dal (SFS)	9768	
74	Rupar	GEN	G. Singh	INC	21314	S. S. Josh	CPI	13288	
75	Morinda	(SC)	P. S. Azad	INC	18852	R. Singh	CPI(M)	12377	
76	Kharar	GEN	B. Singh	Akali Dal (SFS)	15429	N. S. Talib	INC	14830	
77	Banur	GEN	P. Singh	INC	18595	P. Singh	Independent	18086	
78	Rajpura	GEN	S. Parkash	INC	11623	K. Singh	Akali Dal (MTS)	7932	
79	Raipur	GEN	S. Kapur	INC	19073	B. Singh	SWA	13337	
80	Patiala	GEN	S. Singh	Akali Dal (MTS)	13778	O. Parkash	ABJS	11541	
81	Dakala	GEN	Y. Singh	Independent	28827	R. Singh	CPI	3297	
82	Samana	(SC)	B. Lal	Independent	14549	H. Singh	INC	12228	
83	Nabha	GEN	N. Singh	Independent	24135	G. Singh	INC	14629	
84	Amloh	(SC)	B. Singh	INC	14629	S. Singh	Akali Dal (SFS)	13146	
85	Sirhind	GEN	J. Singh	Akali Dal (MTS)	13871	R. Singh	Akali Dal (SFS)	12028	
86	Dhuri	GEN	T. Singh	INC	17829	J. Singh	CPI(M)	16556	
87	Malerkotla	GEN	H. H. N. I. A. Khan	INC	22090	N. Mohammad	Akali Dal (SFS)	15307	
88	Sherpur	(SC)	K. Singh	Akali Dal (SFS)	23490	L. Singh	INC	10200	
89	Barnala	GEN	S. Singh	Akali Dal (SFS)	24271	R. Singh	INC	10119	
90	Bhadaur	(SC)	B. Singh	CPI	14748	G. Singh	INC	8287	
91	Dhanaula	GEN	H. Singh	CPI(M)	21192	B. H. Singh	INC	11228	
92	Sangrur	GEN	J. Singh	Akali Dal (SFS)	14233	G. Singh	INC	13437	
93	Sunam	GEN	G. Singh	Akali Dal (SFS)	20027	N. Ram	ABJS	8671	
94	Lehra	GEN	B. Bhan	INC	26377	B. Lal	Independent	10340	
95	Sardulgarh	GEN	H. Singh	Akali Dal (SFS)	22167	K. Singh	INC	19050	
96	Budhlada	GEN	G. Singh	INC	19621	T. Singh	Akali Dal (SFS)	16977	
97	Mansa	GEN	J. Singh	CPI	14466	H. Singh	INC	11864	
98	Talwandi Sabo	GEN	D. Singh	Akali Dal (SFS)	21148	G. Singh	INC	10106	
99	Pakka Kalan	GEN	K. Singh	Akali Dal (SFS)	19968	T. Singh	INC	15865	
100	Bhatinda	GEN	F. Chand	Independent	26356	H. Lal	INC	14921	
101	Phul	GEN	H. Singh	INC	19826	B. Singh	CPI	17925	
102	Nathana	(SC)	H. Singh	Akali Dal (SFS)	21061	K. Singh	INC	7615	
103	Kotkapura	GEN	H. Singh	Akali Dal (SFS)	23907	M. Singh	INC	14185	
104	Faridkot	(SC)	B. Singh	Akali Dal (SFS)	16273	S. Singh	INC	12771	

== Government formation ==
After result Gurnam Singh formed the government by making an alliance called People's United Front with other political parties, but in November 1967 Lashman Singh Gill with 16 MLAs defected and with the support of Indian National Congress formed government which lasted till August 1968.

== See also ==
- Fourth Punjab Legislative Assembly
- Politics of Punjab, India
