= 1968 Punjab, India political crisis =

Political crisis in Indian state of Punjab

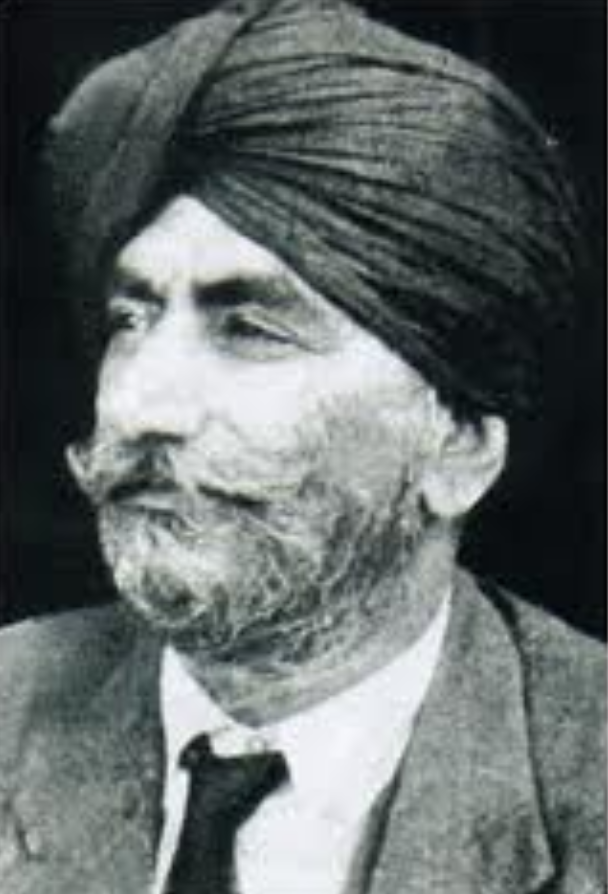
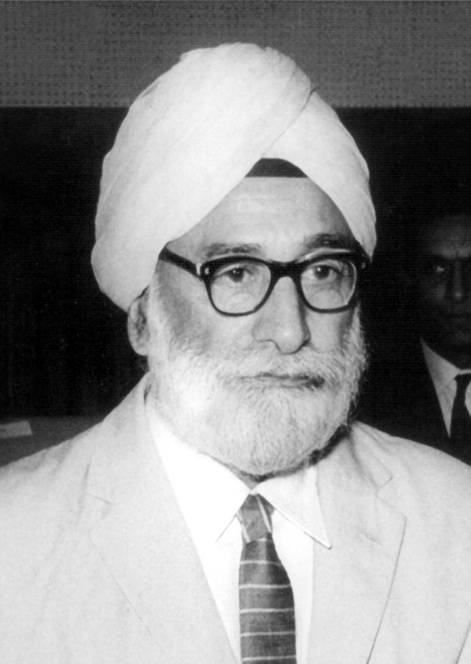
- Date: 6 March 1968 - 30 July 1968 (146 days)
- Location: Punjab, India
- Type: Parliamentary crisis
- Cause: No-confidence motion against Speaker of Punjab Legislative Assembly, Joginder Singh Mann.
- Participants: Joginder Singh Mann (Speaker); Lachhman Singh Gill (Chief Minister); Gurnam Singh (Leader of Opposition)
- Outcome: Speaker's removal failed; Ideological split in between Punjab Janta Party and Indian National Congress; Fall of Janta-Congress coalition government; Imposition of President's rule in Punjab

On 6 March 1968, the legislators from Punjab Janta Party and Indian National Congress moved a no-confidence motion against Speaker of Punjab Legislative Assembly, Joginder Singh Mann and the later development cause a Constitutional crisis in Punjab.

== Background ==
After fall of the People's United Front government, Lachhman Singh Gill's Punjab Janta Party formed the Government with Congress and other parties on 25 November 1967.

On 6 March 1968, a motion of no-confidence was admitted against Speaker Joginder Singh Mann (Akali Dal - Tara Singh) in the house. The motion was backed by 56 members. The Congress and the Janta members voted for admission. The motion expressed lack of confidence in the Speaker for his failure to maintain dignity and decorum of the House and for his failure in getting his order enforced.

== Crisis ==
Speaker's removal failed

The following day, when the Assembly was in session, the Leader of Opposition, Gurnam Singh, challenged the constitutionality of the no-confidence motion moved against the Speaker. He questioned its validity on the ground that, under Article 179(c) of the Constitution of India, a 14-days notice for the removal of the Speaker was required. Moreover, there was no provision for expressing want of confidence in the Speaker. He asserted that under the rules there could be a resolution to remove him. But the two motions expressed lack of confidence in the Speaker. So their tabling as well as the permission granted by the House for discussion was unconstitutional.

The Speaker took the hint and declared that a no-confidence motion admitted against him on previous day was unconstitutional, as it violated Article 179(c), and deemed to have not been moved. The ruling was followed by unruly scenes. The Speaker then adjourned the House for two months. The Speaker claimed that:-

Since I found no hope of the ruling Janta Party and the Congress showing the signs of permitting the House to work in a smooth manner, I felt convinced that it was of no use wasting the public time and money. Therefore, I adjourned the House for two months.

Constitutional crisis

The abrupt and adjournment created a serious Constitutional problem in the State. It was a Budget Session of the Assembly and for the budget for 1968-69 had got to passed before the end of the Financial year 1967-68 (31 March 1968). If it was not done, all government activities would come to a standstill from April next. This cause a great cause of concern for the Lachhman Singh Gill's led coalition Government.

On 11 March, the Speaker ordered prorogation of the State Assembly and this was authenticated by the Chief Secretary to the Government. On 13 March, the Governor of Punjab, D. C. Pavate, issued an Ordinance to regulate the procedure for transacting the financial business. The ordinance also barred the Speaker from adjourning the House on his own. On the following day, Governor summoned the Assembly to meet on 18 March ar 2:00 p.m., but the members received the notification relating to the summoning of the State Assembly on 18 March.

On 18 March, when house met, Gurnam Singh raised a point of order that the re-summoning of the House by the Governor was unconstitutional ad bad in law on the following grounds:

- The Chief Secretary had no authority to authenticate the Governor's order relating to the prorogation of the House
- When the house was in session, the Governor could not issue Ordinance on 13 March.
- The re-summoning could be effective only from the day (March 18) on which members received the gazette notification.

The Speaker accepted Gurnam Singh's contention and alleged that the House had been summoned for 14 March, but prorogued on 18 March. He further added that the order re-summoning the House was also illegal and void. He, therefore, adjourned the House and left the hall after giving his ruling and the Assembly staff also withdrew.

Passing of Bills

After few minutes Sergeant-at-arms announced the arrival of the Deputy Speaker and the proceedings of the House, began with the Deputy Speaker occupying a front seat. Within a seconds several men jumped onto the Speaker's rostrum from behind. These men tried to remove tried to remove the opposition members and scuffle followed. Within fifteen minutes the rostrum was cleared and the Deputy Speaker occupied the Chair of Speaker. Amidst deafening noise and thumping of tables, shouting of slogans, all Financial business of the House including passing of Supplementary Budget for 1968-69 relating to Appropriation Bills were purported to have been passed. On 22 March, the Punjab Governor, gave his assent to the two Appropriation Bills.

Court's involvement

On 2 April, the Punjab and Haryana High Court admitted two writ petitions filed by the opposition leafers, challenging the validity of the Punjab Governor's order proroguing the State Assembly, the 'Punjab Legislative (Regulation of Procedure) - in relation to Financial Business - Ordinance 1968'; the 'Punjab Appropriation Bills' and the sittings of State Assembly and the State Council on 18 and 20 March respectively. On 10 April, High Court unanimously held the two acts to be ultra vires of the Constitution and invalid.

Lachhman Singh Gill government filed an appeal to the Supreme Court of India against the judgment of the High Court. On 13 May, the SC allowed 'interim stay' against the judgment of the High Court thereby enabling the State of Punjab to make collections till 21 May. On 30 July, Supreme Court set aside the judgment of the High Court, which halt the crisis permanently.

== Collapse of coalition government ==
However, Government secured a win in the Court but failed to remove Speaker and this cause widened the gap between two parties i.e. Punjab Janta Party and Indian National Congress. With more differences, ultimately, Congress withdrawed the support to Gill's government. On 21 August 1969, Lachhman Singh Gill resigned form the Chief Minister post. As no other party was in position to form Government, on 23 August, President's rule was imposed and the Assembly dissolved prematurely.

== See also ==
- 2021 Punjab, India political crisis
