= Chief Minister of Punjab, India =

Head of government of Punjab, India

Chief Minister of Punjab
- Emblem of Punjab

- Flag of India
- Incumbent; Bhagwant Maan since 16 March 2022
- Chief Minister's Office; Government of Punjab
- Style: The Honourable (formal); Mr. Chief Minister (informal)
- Type: Leader of the Executive
- Status: Head of government
- Abbreviation: CMoPunjab
- Member of: State Cabinet; Legislative Assembly
- Reports to: Governor of Punjab; Punjab Legislative Assembly
- Residence: 7, Sector-2, Chandigarh
- Seat: Punjab Civil Secretariat, Capitol Complex, Chandigarh
- Appointer: Governor of Punjab; by convention based on appointees ability to command confidence in the Punjab Legislative Assembly
- Term length: At the confidence of the assembly; Chief minister's term is for five years and is subject to no term limits.
- Precursor: Premier of the Punjab; Chief Minister of PEPSU
- Inaugural holder: Gopi Chand Bhargava
- Formation: 15 August 1947 (79 years ago)
- Deputy: Deputy Chief Minister of Punjab
- Salary: ₹230,000 (US$2,400)/monthly; ₹2,760,000 (US$29,000)/annually
- Website: https://punjab.gov.in/

The chief minister of Punjab is the head of the government of Punjab. As per the Constitution of India, the Governor of Punjab is the state's head, but de facto executive authority rests with the chief minister. Following elections to the Punjab Legislative Assembly, the governor usually invites the party (or coalition) with a majority of seats to form the government. The governor appoints the chief minister, whose council of ministers are collectively responsible to the assembly. Given that he has the confidence of the assembly, the chief minister's term is for five years and is subject to no term limits.

== History ==
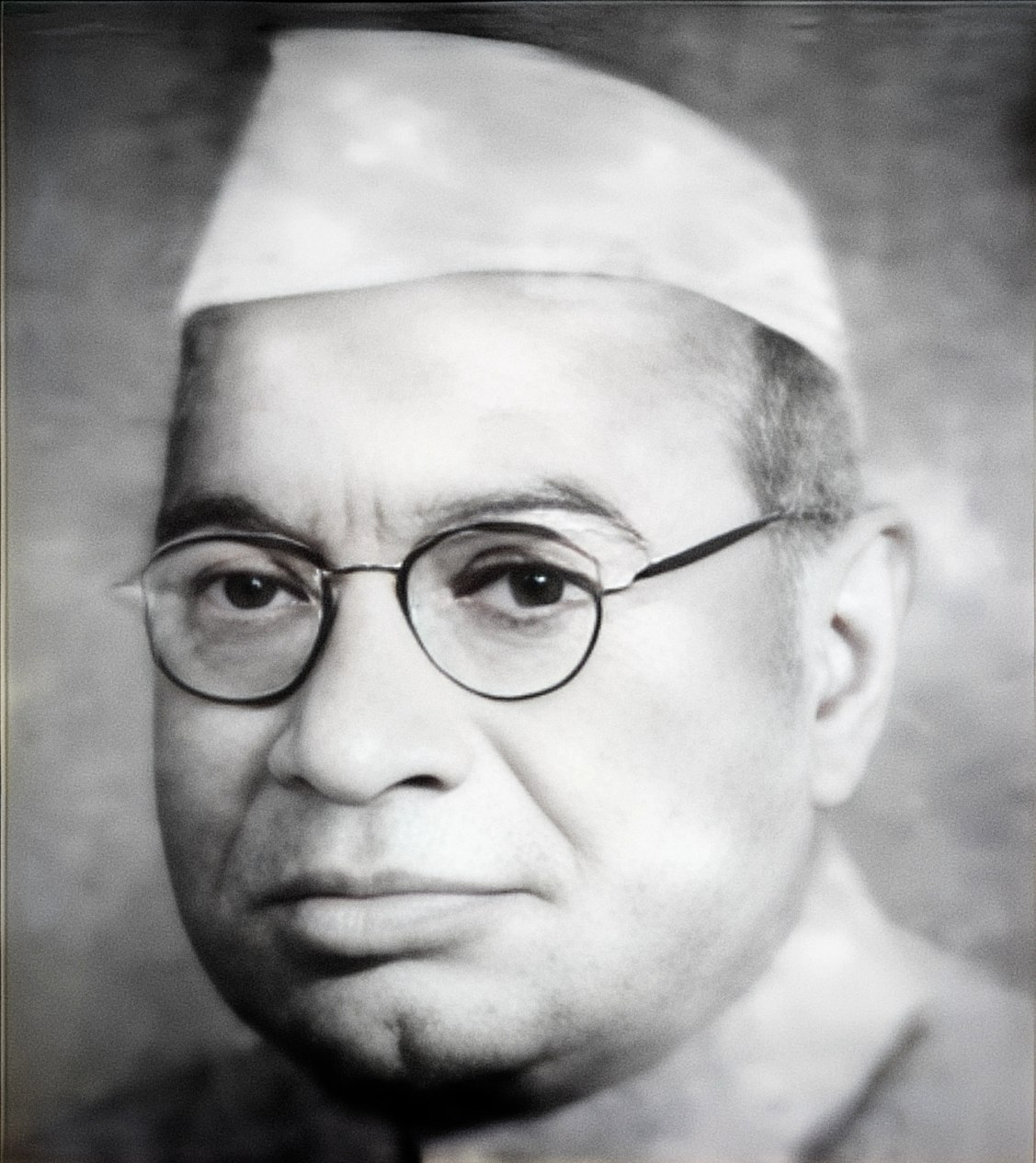
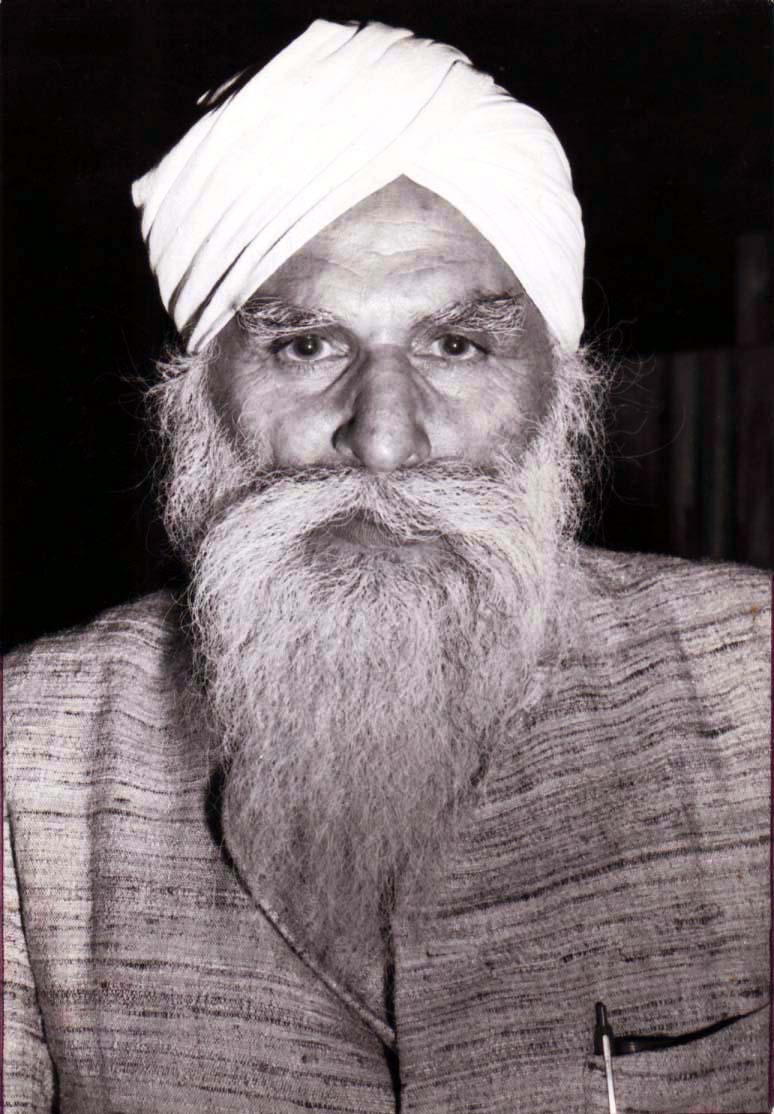
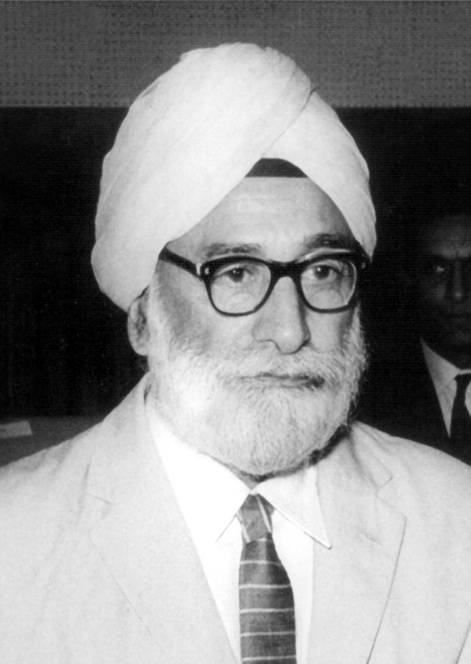
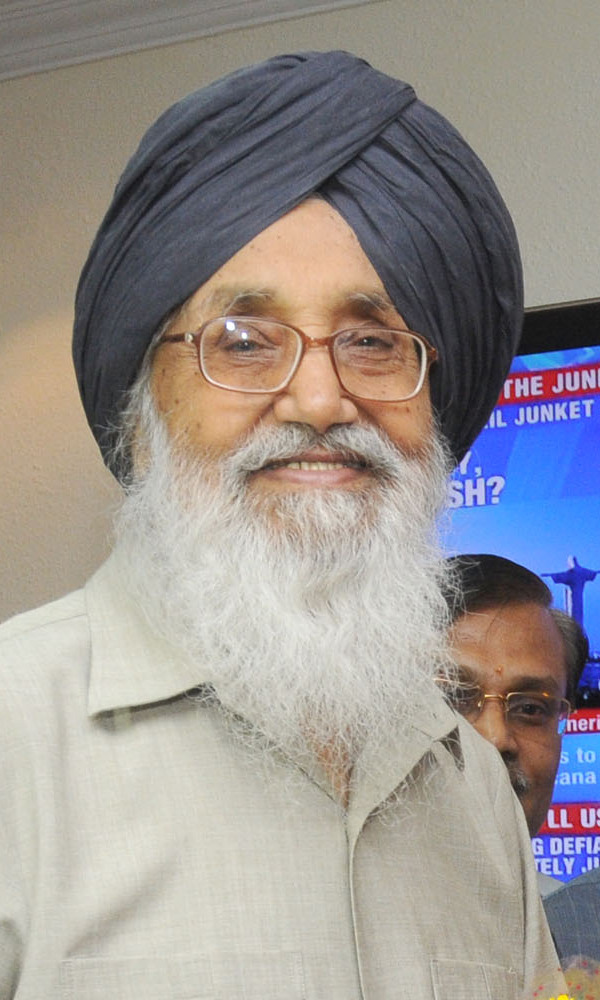
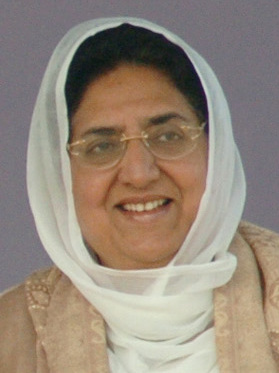
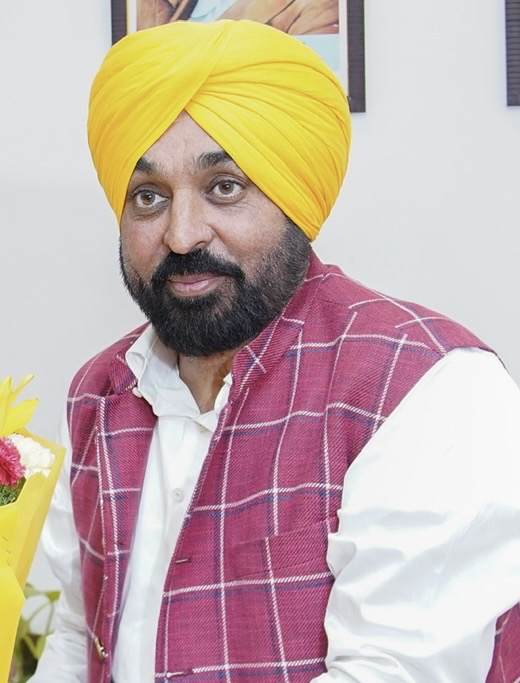
- Top left: Gopi Chand Bhargava was the first chief minister of Punjab after Independence.
- Top centre: Gurmukh Singh Musafir was the first chief minister after reorganization of Punjab in 1966.
- Top right: Gurnam Singh was the first non-congress chief minister of Punjab.
- Bottom left: Parkash Singh Badal is the longest serving chief minister of Punjab, served a period of more than 18 years.
- Bottom centre: Rajinder Kaur Bhattal is the first and only female chief minister till now and shortest serving chief minister of Punjab
- Bottom right: Bhagwant Mann is the incumbent and the first chief minister from a party other than Congress and Akali Dal which won majority on its own in Punjab assembly.

=== Punjab Province (1937-1947) ===
The province of Punjab was then headquartered in Lahore.Under the Government of India Act 1935, a bicameral legislature was set up with a legislative assembly and a legislative council with a government headed by the Prime Minister. The Unionist Party won the Punjab Provincial Assembly elections, 1937 and Sir Sikandar Hayat Khan became the Premier of Punjab and hold the position up to his death in 1942. Khan was succeeded by Sir Khizar Tiwana. In 1946 elections were held the Unionist Party stood fourth place but with the support of Indian National Congress and Shiromani Akali Dal formed the government under Sir Khizar Tiwana. Tiwana later resigned on 2 March 1947 against the decision of Partition of India.

=== Patiala and East Punjab States Union (1948-1956) ===
Patiala and East Punjab States Union or PEPSU was an Indian state formed by the union of the post-partition province of Punjab on the Indian side of the border with eight princely states, which were allowed to maintain their native monarchs. The state was inaugurated on 15 July 1948 and formally became a state in 1950. Among these princely states, six were salute states:- Patiala, Jind, Kapurthala, Nabha, Faridkot and Malerkotla. The other two states were Nalagarh and Kalsia. PEPSU was earlier headed by the Premier, from 1952 the chief minister become the head of the government. On 1 November 1956, PEPSU was merged mostly into East Punjab (Punjab from 1950) following the States Reorganisation Act, 1956.

=== East Punjab (1947-1966) ===
The state of East Punjab was formed in 1947 later it was renamed Punjab in 1950. It consisted of the parts of the Punjab Province of British India that went to India following the partition of India. Since 1947, Punjab has had fifteen chief ministers. The first was Gopi Chand Bhargava of the Indian National Congress party, who was sworn in on 15 August 1947, when India gained independence from the British. He was succeeded by fellow Congressman Bhim Sen Sachar, who was then subsequently replaced after 188 days by former Chief Minister Gopi Chand Bhargava. After a brief term, President Rajendra Prasad placed the Punjab Legislative Assembly under suspension for nine months to help the state government gets its act together. In 1952, the first state elections took place for the Legislative Assembly. The results of the election saw the return of the Congress government with former Chief Minister Bhim Sen Sachar as its leader. After he resigned in 1956, Partap Singh Kairon became chief minister. Serving until 1964, Kairon remains one of Punjab's longest-serving chief ministers. He was followed by the returning Chief Minister Gopi Chand Bhargava, who briefly held office as acting chief minister for only 15 days. In July 1964, Ram Kishan assumed the office and served for two years. His tenure was followed by the President's rule which lasted for 119 days. On 1 November 1966, the state of Haryana was partitioned from Punjab and some other districts were given to the state of Himachal Pradesh.

=== Punjab (Since 1966) ===
The first chief minister of the newly re-configured state was Gurmukh Singh Musafir who led a Congress government from the Vidhan Parishad, one of only two to have done so. In the 1967 elections, he was voted out of power in favour of the Akali Das Sant Fateh Singh Group whose leader Gurnam Singh became the first non-Congress chief minister. Gurnam Singh's government was succeeded by three short-lived Akali Dal governments—Lachhman Singh Gill's government for less than a year and a little more than a year under the returning Gurnam Singh and Parkash Singh Badal. After 272 days under President's rule, the Congress party returned to power under the future President Zail Singh. In 1977, Parkash Singh Badal became the chief minister for the second time. Darbara Singh became chief minister in 1980 and remained in office for three years before a long period under President's rule. A brief interlude under Surjit Singh Barnala followed, after which three Congress-led governments took office—led by Beant Singh from 1992 to 1995, Harcharan Singh Brar from 1995 to 1996 and Rajinder Kaur Bhattal from 1996 to 1997. Upon taking office, Rajinder Kaur Bhattal became the first female chief minister of Punjab and overall the 8th female chief minister in India.

Parkash Singh Badal assumed office for the third time in 1997 and became the first chief minister, since Kairon's resignation in 1964, to serve a full term. Badal was succeeded by Congressman Amarinder Singh, who also successfully served a full term. In 2017 he became CM for the second time but failed to complete his tenure due to internal political factionalism and Charanjit Singh Channi became the first Dalit chief minister of Punjab just 6 months before the expiry of the 15th assembly.

Since 1947, only 4 chief ministers had completed their five years term. Partap Singh Kairon, Zail Singh, Parkash Singh Badal and Amarinder Singh. No other chief minister had completed their single full term.

== Office ==
The office of the chief minister of Punjab is located at Punjab Civil Secretariat, Sector – 1, Chandigarh.

== Oath ==
The chief minister is required to make and subscribe in the presence of the governor of Punjab before entering office, the oath of office and secrecy, as per the Third Schedule of the Constitution of India.

Oath of office:

I, <name>, do swear in the name of God/solemnly affirm that I will bear true faith and allegiance to the Constitution of India as by law established, [that I will uphold the sovereignty and integrity of India,] that I will faithfully and conscientiously discharge my duties as a (Chief) Minister for the State (of Punjab) and that I will do right to all manner of people in accordance with the Constitution and the law without fear or favour, affection or ill-will

— Constitution of India, Third Schedule, Part V

Oath of secrecy:

I, <name>, do swear in the name of God/solemnly affirm that I will not directly or indirectly communicate or reveal to any person or persons any matter which shall be brought under my consideration or shall become known to me as (Chief) Minister for the State (of Punjab) except as may be required for the due discharge of my duties as such Minister.

— Constitution of India, Third Schedule, Part VI

Mostly the chief minister of Punjab takes oath in Punjabi language, which is also mentioned in the Punjabi version of Indian Constitution. A. Oath of Office (Padd di Saunh) "Main, [Name], Ishwar di saunh khanda han / sachcha vishwas dilaunda han ki main kanoon valon sthapit Bharat de Samvidhan (Constitution) prati sachchi shradha te nishtha rakhanga. Main Bharat di prabhusatta (sovereignty) te akhandta (integrity) nu barqrar rakhanga. Main [State Name] de Mukkh Mantri (Chief Minister) vajeon apne farzan nu imaandari te poori nishtha naal nibhavanga, te main bina kise darr, pakhpaat, lalach ya vaer-virodh de, Samvidhan ate kanoon de mutabiq sabhi loka naal nayaa (justice) karanga."

B. Oath of Secrecy (Gupat-ta di Saunh) "Main, [Name], Ishwar di saunh khanda han / sachcha vishwas dilaunda han ki jo vi mamla [State Name] de Mukkh Mantri vajeon mere vichar layi lyaya javega ya mainu pata laggega, usnu main kise vi vyakti ya vyaktian nu, pratyaksh (directly) ya apratyaksh (indirectly) roop vich udon tak sanjha (reveal) nahi karanga, jado tak ki mere farzan nu poora karan layi ajeha karna zaroori na hove."

== Leader of the House ==
A Minister designated by the Government to supervise the management of government business in the Legislative Assembly is known as the Leader of the House. The Rules of Procedure of the Rajya Sabha and Lok Sabha define "Leader of the House". In both Houses, the leader of the house is a crucial official who directly affects how business is done. A House deputy leader may also be appointed by him. Government meeting scheduling and House business are under the purview of the Leader of the House. In addition, the Leader of the House serves as the legislative chair of the majority party. Rather than the Constitution, the Rules of the House specify the duties of the head of the house.

=== Role and Function ===
One important parliamentary official who has direct authority over the way the Legislative assembly operates is the Leader of the House. All of the government's policies are centered around him, particularly as they relate to the House's internal operations and measures pertaining to the conduct of its business. The Chief Whip resolves the specifics with the Leader of the House's agreement, although the Leader of the House is ultimately in charge of how government activity is organized. The Leader of the House suggests dates for the House's summons and prorogation with the Chair's approval. He is in charge of organizing the formal proceedings of the Parliamentary Session, including the introduction of legislation and motions.

=== Leader of House of Punjab Assembly ===
Since the formation of the Punjab Legislative assembly, the leader of the house of assembly is served by the Chief minister of Punjab. However there were two certain occasions when the Chief minister was the not the member of the house of legislative assembly and thus during that period of time, the role of the leader of house is served by person other than the chief minister. When Gopi Chand Bhargava became the acting chief minister of the Punjab in the year of 1964 after the resignation of the then chief minister Partap Singh Kairon, the role of the leader of the house was fulfilled by the Kairon even after his resignation. Second time, when Gurmukh Singh Musafir become the chief minister after the reorganization of Punjab in 1966, the predecessor chief minister Ram Kishan served as the leader of the house during the chief minister-ship of the Musaffir. In all other cases, the chief minister of Punjab also serves as the Leader of the House.

== Predecessors ==
=== Punjab Province (1937–1947) ===
Color key

- Unionist Party (2)

No	Portrait	Name (Birth–Death) (Constituency)	Term of office		Time in office	Party (Alliance/ Partner)	Assembly (Election)	Appointed by (Governor)
No	Portrait	Name (Birth–Death) (Constituency)	Took office	Left office	Time in office	Party (Alliance/ Partner)	Assembly (Election)	Appointed by (Governor)
1		Sikandar Hayat Khan (1882-1942) (West-Punjab Landlord)	5 April 1937	26 December 1942^{[d]}	5 years, 265 days	Unionist Party (Khalsa National Party)	1st (1937)	Herbert William Emerson
Vacant (26 - 30 December 1940) (4 days)
2		Malik Khizar Hayat Tiwana (1900-1975) (Khushab)	30 December 1942	19 March 1945	2 years, 79 days	Unionist Party (Khalsa National Party)	1st (1937)	Bertrand Glancy
(i)	Governor; Rule		19 March 1945	21 March 1946	1 year, 2 days	-		Viscount Wavell
(2)		Malik Khizar Hayat Tiwana (1900-1975) (Khushab)	21 March 1946	2 March 1947	346 days	Unionist Party (Indian National Congress-Shiromani Akali Dal)	2nd (1946)	Bertrand Glancy
(ii)	Governor; Rule		2 March 1947	15 August 1947^{[pd]}	166 days	-		Earl Mountbatten

=== Patiala and East Punjab States Union (1948–1956) ===
Color key

- Indian National Congress (2)
- Independent (1)

Key

- No.: Incumbent number
- ^{†} Assassinated
- ^{d} Died in Office
- ^{pd} Position Dissolved
- ^{R} Resigned
- Acting Chief Minister

No	Portrait	Name (Birth–Death) (Constituency)	Term of office		Time in office	Party (Alliance/ Partner)	Assembly (Election)	Appointed by (Rajpramukh)
No	Portrait	Name (Birth–Death) (Constituency)	Took office	Left office	Time in office	Party (Alliance/ Partner)	Assembly (Election)	Appointed by (Rajpramukh)
Interim Government (1948–1949)
-		Gian Singh Rarewala (1901-1979) ( – ) (Acting)	15 July 1948	13 January 1949	182 days	IND	Interim Government	Yadavindra Singh
Premier (1949-1952)
1		Gian Singh Rarewala (1901-1979) ( – )	13 January 1949	23 May 1951^{[R]}	2 years, 130 days	IND	Not Yet Created	Yadavindra Singh
2		Raghbir Singh (1895-1955) ( – )	23 May 1951	21 April 1952	1 year, 333 days	Indian National Congress	Not Yet Created	Yadavindra Singh
Chief Minister (1952–1956)
1		Raghbir Singh (1895-1955) (Patiala Sadar)	21 April 1952	22 April 1952^{[R]}	1 day	Indian National Congress	1st (1952)	Yadavindra Singh
2		Gian Singh Rarewala (1901-1979) (Amloh)	22 April 1952	5 March 1953	317 days	IND (UDF)	1st (1952)	Yadavindra Singh
(i)		Vacant (Note: President's rule may be imposed when the "government in a state is not able to function as per the Constitution", which often happens because no party or coalition has a majority in the assembly. When President's rule is in force in a state, its council of ministers stands dissolved. The office of chief minister thus lies vacant, and the administration is taken over by the governor, who functions on behalf of the central government. At times, the legislative assembly also stands dissolved.) (President's rule)	5 March 1953	8 March 1954	1 year, 3 days	-		Rajendra Prasad
(1)		Raghbir Singh (1895-1955) (Patiala Sadar)	8 March 1954	12 January 1955^{[d]}	310 days	Indian National Congress	2nd (1954)	Yadavindra Singh
3		Brish Bhan (1908-1988) (Kalayat)	12 January 1955	1 November 1956^{[pd]}	1 year, 294 days	Indian National Congress	2nd (1954)	Yadavindra Singh

== Chief ministers of Punjab (1947–present) ==
Key

- No.: Incumbent number
- ^{†} Assassinated
- ^{d} Died in Office
- ^{pd} Position Dissolved
- ^{R} Resigned
- Acting Chief Minister

Color keys for the party of the chief minister

- Aam Aadmi Party (1)
- Akali Dal – Sant Fateh Singh Group (1)
- Indian National Congress (12)
- Punjab Janata Party (1)
- Shiromani Akali Dal (3)

S.No.	Portrait	Name (birth-death) (Constituency)	Tenure			Party (Coalition)	Election	Assembly	Appointed by (Governor)
S.No.	Portrait	Name (birth-death) (Constituency)	Took office	Left office	Term in office	Party (Coalition)	Election	Assembly	Appointed by (Governor)
Before reorganisation of Punjab (1947–1966)
1		Gopi Chand Bhargava (1889-1966) (University)	15 August 1947	13 April 1949^{[R]}	1 year, 241 days	Indian National Congress	1946	Interim Assembly	Chandulal Madhavlal Trivedi
2		Bhim Sen Sachar (1894-1978) (Lahore City)	13 April 1949 (Note: Bhargava resigned from the post of chief minister on 6 April 1949 but hold the office until Sachar succeeded him on 13 April.)	18 October 1949^{[R]}	188 days	Indian National Congress	1946	Interim Assembly	Chandulal Madhavlal Trivedi
(1)		Gopi Chand Bhargava (1889-1966) (University)	18 October 1949	20 June 1951	1 year, 245 days	Indian National Congress	1946	Interim Assembly	Chandulal Madhavlal Trivedi
(i)		Vacant (President's rule) (Note: Assembly Dissolved prematurely)	20 June 1951	17 April 1952	302 days	-			
(2)		Bhim Sen Sachar (1894-1978) (Ludhiana City South)	17 April 1952	22 July 1953^{[R]}	3 years, 281 days	Indian National Congress	1952	First	Chandulal Madhavlal Trivedi
(2)		Bhim Sen Sachar (1894-1978) (Ludhiana City South)	22 July 1953 (Note: Sachar resigned from the post of Chief Minister due to the differences with cabinet minister Sri Ram Sharma, but on same day re-sworn as Chief Minister.)	23 January 1956^{[R]}	3 years, 281 days	Indian National Congress	1952	First	Chandeshwar Prasad Narayan Singh
3		Partap Singh Kairon (1901-1965) (Sujanpur)	23 January 1956	9 April 1957	8 years, 150 days	Indian National Congress	1952	First	Chandeshwar Prasad Narayan Singh
3		Partap Singh Kairon (1901-1965) (Sujanpur)	9 April 1957	11 March 1962	8 years, 150 days	Indian National Congress	1957	Second	Chandeshwar Prasad Narayan Singh
3		Partap Singh Kairon (1901-1965) (Sujanpur)	12 March 1962	21 June 1964^{[R]}	8 years, 150 days	Indian National Congress	1962	Third	Narhar Vishnu Gadgil
-		Gopi Chand Bhargava (1889-1966) (MLC) (Acting)	21 June 1964 (Note: Bhargava's one of the three terms was as caretaker Chief Minister serving for 15 days due to the resignation of Partap Singh Kairon.)	6 July 1964	15 days	Indian National Congress	1962	Third	Pattom A. Thanu Pillai
4		Ram Kishan (1913-1971) (Jalandhar North East)	7 July 1964	5 July 1966	1 year, 363 days	Indian National Congress	1962	Third	Pattom A. Thanu Pillai
(ii)		Vacant (President's rule) (Note: Assembly suspended to facilitate state's bifurcation)	5 July 1966	1 November 1966	119 days	-			
After reorganisation of Punjab (Since 1966)
5		Gurmukh Singh Musafir (1899-1976) (MLC)	1 November 1966	8 March 1967	127 days	Indian National Congress	1962	Third	Dharma Vira
6		Gurnam Singh (1899-1973) (Qila Raipur)	8 March 1967	25 November 1967^{[R]}	262 days	Akali Dal – Sant Fateh Singh Group (PUF)	1967	Fourth	Dharma Vira
7		Lachhman Singh Gill (1917-1969) (Dharamkot)	25 November 1967	23 August 1968^{[R]}	272 days	Punjab Janata Party (INC)	1967	Fourth	D. C. Pavate
(iii)		Vacant (President's rule)	23 August 1968	17 February 1969	178 days	-			
(6)		Gurnam Singh (1899-1973) (Qila Raipur)	17 February 1969	27 March 1970^{[R]}	1 year, 38 days	Shiromani Akali Dal (UFP till 1970) (BJS; 1970-71)	1969	Fifth	D. C. Pavate
8		Parkash Singh Badal (1927-2023) (Gidderbaha)	27 March 1970	14 June 1971	1 year, 79 days	Shiromani Akali Dal (UFP till 1970) (BJS; 1970-71)	1969	Fifth	D. C. Pavate
(iv)		Vacant (President's rule)	14 June 1971	17 March 1972	277 days	-			
9		Zail Singh (1916-1994) (Anandpur Sahib)	17 March 1972	30 April 1977	5 years, 44 days	Indian National Congress (CPI)	1972	Sixth	Mahendra Mohan Choudhry
(v)		Vacant (President's rule)	30 April 1977	20 June 1977	51 days	-			
(8)		Parkash Singh Badal (1927-2023) (Gidderbaha)	20 June 1977	17 February 1980	2 years, 242 days	Shiromani Akali Dal (JP & CPI)	1977	Seventh	Mahendra Mohan Choudhry
(vi)		Vacant (President's rule)	17 February 1980	6 June 1980	110 days	-			
10		Darbara Singh (1916-1990) (Nakodar)	6 June 1980	6 October 1983	3 years, 122 days	Indian National Congress	1980	Eighth	Jaisukh Lal Hathi
(vii)		Vacant (President's rule) (Note: Assembly was under suspension from 6 October 1983 to 26 June 1985 and then dissolved on 26 June 1985.)	6 October 1983	29 September 1985	1 year, 358 days	-			
11		Surjit Singh Barnala (1925-2017) (Barnala)	29 September 1985	11 June 1987	1 year, 255 days	Shiromani Akali Dal	1985	Ninth	Arjun Singh
(viii)		Vacant (President's rule) (Note: Assembly was under suspension from 11 June 1987 to 6 March 1988 and then dissolve on 6 March 1988.)	11 June 1987	25 February 1992	4 years, 259 days	-			
12		Beant Singh (1922-1995) (Jalandhar Cantonment)	25 February 1992	31 August 1995^{[†]}	3 years, 187 days	Indian National Congress	1992	Tenth	Surendra Nath
13		Harcharan Singh Brar (1922-2009) (Muktsar)	31 August 1995	21 November 1996^{[R]}	1 year, 82 days	Indian National Congress	1992	Tenth	B. K. N. Chhibber
14		Rajinder Kaur Bhattal (b. 1945) (Lehra)	21 November 1996	11 February 1997	82 days	Indian National Congress	1992	Tenth	B. K. N. Chhibber
(8)		Parkash Singh Badal (1927-2023) (Lambi)	12 February 1997	26 February 2002	5 years, 14 days	Shiromani Akali Dal	1997	Eleventh	B. K. N. Chhibber
15		Amarinder Singh (b. 1942) (Patiala Urban)	26 February 2002	1 March 2007	5 years, 3 days	Indian National Congress	2002	Twelfth	J. F. R. Jacob
(8)		Parkash Singh Badal (1927-2023) (Lambi)	1 March 2007	14 March 2012	10 years, 15 days	Shiromani Akali Dal	2007	Thirteen	Sunith Francis Rodrigues
(8)		Parkash Singh Badal (1927-2023) (Lambi)	14 March 2012	16 March 2017	10 years, 15 days	Shiromani Akali Dal	2012	Fourteenth	Shivraj Patil
(15)		Amarinder Singh (b. 1942) (Patiala Urban)	16 March 2017	20 September 2021^{[R]}	4 years, 188 days	Indian National Congress	2017	Fifteenth	V. P. Singh Badnore
16		Charanjit Singh Channi (b. 1963) (Chamkaur Sahib)	20 September 2021	16 March 2022	177 days	Indian National Congress	2017	Fifteenth	Banwarilal Purohit
17		Bhagwant Mann (b. 1973) (Dhuri)	16 March 2022	Incumbent	4 years, 232 days	Aam Aadmi Party	2022	Sixteenth	Banwarilal Purohit

== Statistics ==
=== List of chief minister by their tenure ===
Rank	Chief Minister	Party	Start	End	Tenure length (term)	Tenure length (total)	Reason for exit
1	Prakash Singh Badal	Shiromani Akali Dal	27 March 1970	14 June 1971	1 year, 79 days	18 years, 350 days	Loss of majority
1	Prakash Singh Badal	Shiromani Akali Dal	20 June 1977	17 February 1980	2 years, 242 days	18 years, 350 days	Government dismissed
1	Prakash Singh Badal	Shiromani Akali Dal	12 February 1997	26 February 2002	5 years, 14 days	18 years, 350 days	Loss of election
1	Prakash Singh Badal	Shiromani Akali Dal	1 March 2007	16 March 2017	10 years, 15 days	18 years, 350 days	Loss of election
2	Amarinder Singh	Indian National Congress	26 February 2002	1 March 2007	5 years, 3 days	9 years, 191 days	Loss of election
2	Amarinder Singh	Indian National Congress	16 March 2017	20 September 2021	4 years, 188 days	9 years, 191 days	Resigned
3	Partap Singh Kairon	Indian National Congress	23 January 1956	21 June 1964	8 years, 150 days		Resigned
4	Zail Singh	Indian National Congress	17 March 1972	30 April 1977	5 years, 44 days		Government dismissed
5	Bhagwant Mann	Aam Aadmi Party	16 March 2022	Incumbent	4 years, 232 days		Incumbent
6	Bhim Sen Sachar	Indian National Congress	13 April 1949	18 October 1949	188 days	4 years, 104 days	Resigned
6	Bhim Sen Sachar	Indian National Congress	17 April 1952	23 January 1956	3 years, 281 days	4 years, 104 days	Resigned
7	Beant Singh	Indian National Congress	25 February 1992	31 August 1995	3 years, 187 days		Assassinated
8	Gopi Chand Bhargava	Indian National Congress	15 August 1947	13 April 1949	1 Year, 241 days	3 years, 136 days	Resigned
8	Gopi Chand Bhargava	Indian National Congress	18 October 1949	20 June 1951	1 year, 245 days	3 years, 136 days	Government dismissed
8	Gopi Chand Bhargava	Indian National Congress	21 June 1964	6 July 1964	15 days	3 years, 136 days	Resigned
9	Darbara Singh	Indian National Congress	6 June 1980	6 October 1983	3 years, 122 days		Government dismissed
10	Ram Kishan	Indian National Congress	7 July 1964	5 July 1966	1 year, 262 days		Government dismissed
11	Gurnam Singh	Akali Dal Sant Fateh Singh Group	8 March 1967	25 November 1967	262 days	1 year, 300 days	Loss of majority
11	Gurnam Singh	Shiromani Akali Dal	17 February 1969	27 March 1970	1 year, 38 days	1 year, 300 days	Resigned
12	Surjit Singh Barnala	Shiromani Akali Dal	29 September 1985	11 June 1987	1 year, 255 days		Government dismissed
13	Harcharan Singh Brar	Indian National Congress	31 August 1995	21 November 1996	1 year, 82 days		Resigned
14	Lachhman Singh Gill	Punjab Janata Party	25 November 1967	23 August 1968	272 days		Loss of majority
15	Charanjit Singh Channi	Indian National Congress	20 September 2021	16 March 2022	177 days		Loss of election
16	Gurmukh Singh Musafir	Indian National Congress	1 November 1866	8 March 1967	127 days		Loss of election
17	Rajinder Kaur Bhattal	Indian National Congress	21 November 1996	11 February 1997	82 days		Loss of election
-	President rule	N/A	20 June 1951	17 April 1952	302 days	9 years, 223 days	N/A
-	President rule	N/A	5 July 1966	1 November 1966	199 days	9 years, 223 days	N/A
-	President rule	N/A	23 August 1968	17 February 1969	178 days	9 years, 223 days	N/A
-	President rule	N/A	14 June 1971	17 March 1972	277 days	9 years, 223 days	N/A
-	President rule	N/A	30 April 1977	20 June 1977	51 days	9 years, 223 days	N/A
-	President rule	N/A	17 February 1980	6 June 1980	110 days	9 years, 223 days	N/A
-	President rule	N/A	6 October 1983	29 September 1985	1 year, 358 days	9 years, 223 days	N/A
-	President rule	N/A	11 June 1987	25 February 1992	4 years, 259 days	9 years, 223 days	N/A

== See also ==
- List of current Indian chief ministers
- List of governors of Punjab (India)
- List of deputy chief ministers of Punjab, India
