= People's United Front (Punjab) =

- Abbreviation: PUF
- Chairman: Gurnam Singh
- Founder: Gurnam Singh
- Founded: 4 March 1967
- Dissolved: 25 November 1967
- Seats in Punjab Legislative Assembly (in 1967): 53 / 104

People's United Front was a Post Poll Alliance of 7 Political parties and Independents formed in a Convention at Khanna on 4 March 1967, in Punjab after the election of 1967.

== Background ==
In 1962 Shiromani Akali Dal was divided into Akali Dal - Sant Fateh Singh and Akali Dal - Tara Singh. In 1967, the 4th General election was held in Punjab and no Party got Majority in the newly elected house. Indian National Congress was single largest party with 48 seats. On 4 March 1967, Gurnam Singh was elected as its leader and he called on Governor of Punjab and pressed his claim to form Government and on 8 March 1967, United Front formed its Government in Punjab

== Members ==
The members who joined the Front were as follow:

S. No.	Party	Legislators
1	Akali Dal - Sant Fateh Singh Group	24
2	Bharatiya Jana Sangh	9
3	Communist Party of India	5
4	Communist Party of India (Marxist)	3
5	Republican Party of India	3
6	Akali Dal - Master Tara Singh Group	2
7	Socialist Party	1
8	Independent	6
Total		53

== Common Minimum Programme ==
The People's United Front was formed on the basis of 11-Points CMP and these were:

- 1 - To provide clean and good administration,
- 2 - To make Punjab strong and prosperous,
- 3 - To exempt land revenue for holding up to five acres,
- 4 - To rehabilitate and develop industry and trade,
- 5 - To raise food production by providing incentives to peasants,
- 6 - To provide tax relief to people in urban areas,
- 7 - To ameliorate the lot of Schedule Caste and Backward Classes and distribute surplus cultivable land to the landless,
- 8 - To increase the emoluments and improve living conditions of Government employees,
- 9 - To appoint tribunal to investigate all charges of corruption and nepotism in high places,
- 10 - To fix sales tax at source and to lessen the hardship experienced by the trading community at the hands of the 'inspector raj' and
- 11 - To guarantee adequate wages and dearness allowance and improve the working conditions of the workers.

== Upheavals ==
On 5 April 1967 the United front government suffered defeat in the state vidhan sabha when the amendment to the motion of thanks to the Governor moved by the leader of the Congress opposition was adopted. The amendment sought to regret the omission in the Governor's address of the assurance to the use of Punjabi language up to the secretariat level. Amendment was carried out by 53 votes to 49 in a 104-member house, including the speaker. It was than expected that either the United Front would quit office or seek vote of confidence in the house. The opposition made and uproarious demand for the resignation of the United front ministry, failing which, the dismissal of the ministry. Gurnam Singh vigorously contended that the acceptance of the opposition amendment did not amount to rejection of any of the policies of the government. He held the view that the government was more genuinely interested in the adoption of Punjabi more than the Congress Party.

== No-confidence motion ==
On 25 May 1967 and No-confidence motion against the United front Minister was admitted. Lachhman Singh Gill charged the Congress and state vidhan sabha with using 'corrupt methods' to manoeuvre defections and alleged that that Congress had spent rupees one lakh in just 8 days to purchase members. On the next day the United front government won over the confidence of the house by securing 57 votes in favour and 46 against and the house was adjourned sine die. On the same day, Harcharan Singh Hudiara announced the formation of Akali Dal. This became the third Akali Dal in the state, the other two having been led by Sant Fateh Singh and master Tara Singh. The formation of the third Akali Dal and the eclipse of Sant Fateh Singh by the Rebel leader Harcharan Singh Hundiara, was reminiscent of the Sant's own ouster to Tara Singh.

== Fall of Government ==
On 22 November 1967 before the Punjab Legislative Assembly met for its winter session Lachhman Singh Gill revolted and defected along with 16 legislators from the United Front and formed new party named Punjab Janta Party. On the same day, Sant Fateh Singh, the president of the Akali Dal rushed to Chandigarh in a bid to bring about a rapprochement between Gurnam Singh and Lachhman Singh but did not succeed in his efforts. Ultimately, on the same day Gurnam Singh tendered the resignation of his ministry. Governor accepted the resignation but asked the Gurnam Singh to continue in office till an alternative arrangement was made. After 3 days, Lachhman Singh Gill formed new Government. After this, Alliance ceased to work.

== See also ==
- Fourth Punjab Legislative Assembly
- United Front (Punjab)
