= Akali Dal – Sant Fateh Singh Group =

- Chairman: Sant Fateh Singh
- Founded: 1962
- Dissolved: 7 October 1968
- Merged into: Shiromani Akali Dal

Akali Dal – Sant Fateh Singh Group was one of several hard-line splinter groups founded by Sant Fateh Singh. Akali Dal – Sant Fateh Singh was formed in 1962. It is led by Sant Fateh Singh. The party was a Sikh-centered political party in the Indian state of Punjab. The party was created due to disagreement between Master Tara Singh and Sant Fateh Singh. The party gained control of the Shiromani Gurdwara Prabandhak Committee in October 1962. In the Gurdwara elections in January 1965, the party annexed 90 of the seats, while Master Tara Singh's party could manage only 45. In 1967 during Punjab Legislative Assembly election Party got 24 seats and with the support of other Parties and Independents under the leadership of Gurnam Singh formed People's United Front and the government but resigned after defection by Lachhman Singh Gill and then both factions merged and formed Shiromani Akali Dal on 7 October 1968 at Khadur Sahib.

The party was able to win three seats in 1967 Indian general election.

== Chief Minister ==
No.	Name	Term of office (Assembly election)			Party (coalition with)	Appointed by (Governor)
6	Gurnam Singh (Qila Raipur)	8 March 1967	25 November 1967	262 days	Akali Dal - Sant Fateh Singh (PUF)	Dharma Vira

== See also ==
- Akali Dal - Master Tara Singh Group
