= Patiala Assembly constituency =

Constituency of the Punjab legislative assembly in India

Coordinates: 30.35°N 76.39°E

Patiala
- Constituency No. 115 for the Punjab Legislative Assembly
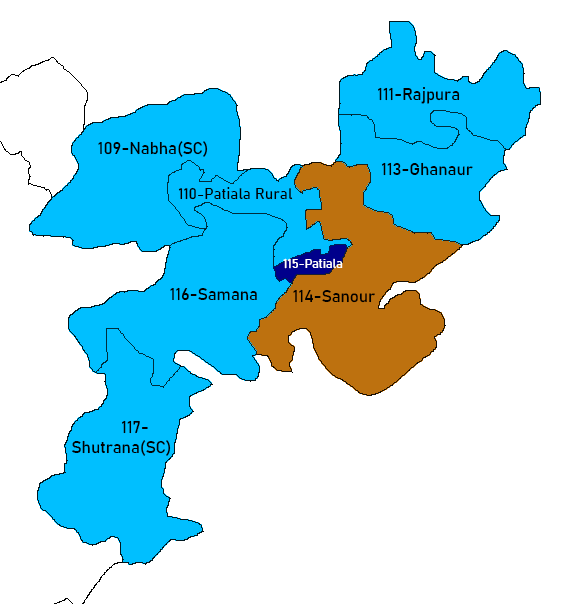

Constituency details
- Country: India
- State: Punjab
- District: Patiala
- Lok Sabha constituency: Patiala
- Total electors: 161,609
- Reservation: None

Member of Legislative Assembly
- 16th Punjab Legislative Assembly
- Incumbent Ajit Pal Singh Kohli
- Party: AAP
- Elected year: 2022

Patiala Assembly constituency, also known as Patiala Urban (Sl. No.: 115), is a Punjab Legislative Assembly constituency in Patiala district, Punjab state, India.

== Members of the Legislative Assembly ==
Most successful parties from Patiala Vidhan Sabha
1. INC (10 Times) (52.6%)
2. SAD (5 Times) (26.3%)
3. AAP (1 Time) (5.26%)
4. AD – MTS (1 Time) (5.26%)
5. IND (1 Time) (5.26%)
6. INC (I) (1 Time) (5.26%)

Election	Name	Political party (Alliance)
As part of PEPSU Legislative Assembly (1951–56)
1952	Jaswant Singh	Shiromani Akali Dal
1954	Manmohan Kaur	Shiromani Akali Dal
As part of Punjab Legislative Assembly (1956–Present)
1957	Surinder Singh	Indian National Congress
1958^	Bhalindra Singh	Independent politician
1962	Ram Partap	Indian National Congress
1967	Jathedar Sardara Singh Kohli	Akali Dal – Master Tara Singh Group
1969	Ravel Singh	Shiromani Akali Dal
1972	Prem Chand	Indian National Congress
1977	Jathedar Sardara Singh Kohli	Shiromani Akali Dal
1980	Brahm Mohindra	Indian National Congress (Indira)
1985	Brahm Mohindra	Indian National Congress
1987	President's Rule	
1992	Brahm Mohindra	Indian National Congress
1997	Surjit Singh Kohli	Shiromani Akali Dal
2002	Amarinder Singh	Indian National Congress
2007	Amarinder Singh	Indian National Congress
2012	Amarinder Singh	Indian National Congress
2014^	Preneet Kaur	Indian National Congress
2017	Amarinder Singh	Indian National Congress
2022	Ajit Pal Singh Kohli	Aam Aadmi Party

^Bypoll

== Election Results ==
=== 2027 ===
Punjab Assembly election, 2027: Patiala
Party	Candidate	Votes	%	±%
AAP	Ajit Pal Singh Kohli			
AD (WPD)				New entry
INC				
BSP				
SAD				
BJP				New entry
NOTA	None of the above			
Majority				
Turnout				

=== 2022 ===
Punjab Assembly election, 2022: Patiala
Party	Candidate	Votes	%	±%
AAP	Ajit Pal Singh Kohli	48,104	46.49	▲27.31
PLC	Amarinder Singh	28,231	27.28	New
SAD	Harpal Juneja	11,835	11.44	▲0.34
INC	Vishnu Sharma	9,871	9.54	▼59.44
NOTA	None of the above	754	0.73	▼0.31
Majority		19,873	19.21	▼30.10
Turnout		103,468	64.00	
Registered electors		161,591		
AAP gain from INC		Swing		

=== 2017 ===
Punjab Assembly election, 2017: Patiala
Party	Candidate	Votes	%	±%
INC	Amarinder Singh	72,586	68.98	
AAP	Dr. Balbir Singh	20,179	19.18	
SAD	Gen J.J. Singh	11,677	11.10	
HSS	Kshama Kant Pandey	291	0.28	
NOTA	None of the above	1,090	1.04	
Majority		52,407	49.31	
Turnout		1,06,436	67.00	
Registered electors		158,855		
INC hold		Swing		

=== 2012 ===
Punjab Assembly election, 2012: Patiala
Party	Candidate	Votes	%	±%
INC	Amarinder Singh	66,041	69.13	
SAD	Surjit Singh Kohli	23,723	24.83	
PPoP	Joga Singh	2,849	2.98	
BSP	Shankar Lal	1,288	1.35	
IND	Rakesh Kumar	638	0.67	
Majority		42,318	44.29	
Turnout		95,539	68.09	
INC hold		Swing		

== See also ==
- Punjab Legislative Assembly
- List of constituencies of the Punjab Legislative Assembly
- Patiala district
- Punjab Lok Congress
- Capt. Amarinder Singh
