= United Front (Punjab) =

- Abbreviation: UF
- Chairman: Gurnam Singh
- Founder: Gurnam Singh
- Founded: 17 February 1969
- Dissolved: 25 March 1970
- Seats in Punjab Legislative Assembly (in 1969): 59 / 104

United Front was a Post Poll Alliance formed after the 1969 Punjab Legislative Assembly election by Akali Dal, Jan Sangh and Left Parties as no single party got absolute majority in Assembly.

== Background ==
Akali Dal formed an alliance with Bharatiya Jana Sangh and 2 Independents who won with the support of Akali Dal. Left Parties, i.e. Communist Party of India and Communist Party of India (Marxist) extended outside support to Akali-Jan Sangh government.

The Chief Minister preferred to call the Coalition Government a 'United Front' Government possibly to keep up the facade of Akali led People's United Front Government (1967). Gurnam Singh formed his ministry with four other members. 2 from Akali Dal (Atma Singh and Sohan Singh) and 2 from Jan Sangh (Balram Das Tandon and Krishan Lal).

== Members ==
The members who joined the Front were as follow:

S. No.	Party	Legislators
1	Shiromani Akali Dal	43
2	Bharatiya Jana Sangh	8
3	Communist Party of India	4
4	Communist Party of India (Marxist)	2
5	Independent	2
Total		59

== Upheavals ==
With the installation of the Coalition Ministry in power, there started a tussle between Gurnam Singh and Sant Chanan Singh (President of SGPC) over the issue of abolition of Punjab Legislative Council. Gurnam Singh publicly declared that the government would bring an official resolution during the budget session in May 1969. Sant Chanan Singh opposed the move because his close associates were the members of the council. Furthermore, Sant wanted Gurnam Singh to include in his ministry a large number of his own men. The CM failure to comply with Sant's order irked the Sant. Gurnam Singh's biggest drawback was that he lacked any hold over the organisation.

In March 1969, about a month after assuming power, the rift between Coalition partners emerged. Differences between Akali Dal and Jan Sangh arose over three vital issues, namely:-

- Language,
- Center-State relations and
- Status of Chandigarh.

== Toppling operation ==
On 25 March 1970, Jathedar Santokh Singh lost the election of Rajya Sabha from Giani Bhupinder Singh (Rebel Akali leader) and this irked the Sant Fateh Singh as he supported Jathedar Santokh Singh and he gave the green signal to Balwant Singh (Finance Minister) to start the toppling operation by refusing to move the Appropriation Bill in the State Assembly.

As the Strategy had already been worked out with the collaboration of the Jan Sangh Chief, Baldev Prakash, the Jan Sangh didn't come to Gurnam Singh's rescue.

On the same day when Speaker called Finance Minister to move Appropriation Bill, he refused to do so. He suddenly announced in the State Assembly, that he would not move the Appropriation Bill. He forgot his constitutional obligations. If he didn't want to carry out his duties, he ought to have resigned. But he did nothing of the kind. By the time, Chief Minister was aware of the manoeuvre, it was too late and the House refused him the permission to move the Appropriation Bill. On this, Gurnam Singh himself moved the bill. This was, however, opposed and voting followed:-

- 22 - Favour [14-Akali (Gurnam faction), 3-Independents, 2-SSP, 1-PJP, 1-PSP, 1-SwP]
- 44 - Against [35-Akali (Sant faction), 7-Jan Sangh and 2-CPIM]
- 32 - Absent [28-Congress and 4-CPI]

After voting against Government by Jan Sangh and CPIM, the Coalition partners, Front ceased to work.

Resignation

On the same day, Governor of Punjab, D. C. Pavate asked Gurnam Singh to resign as he had suffered a defeat on the Finance Bill. Gurnam Singh bluntly told the Governor that he had no intention to resign. Governor reminded him that with his defeat on the Finance Bill, he had practically ceased to be Chief Minister, and that with his resignation his colleagues would automatically cease to be ministers. On 25 March Governor again sent him a letter asking him to resign at once. His Secretary was authorised to inform him orally that the Governor would be required to dismiss him if his resignation didn't not reach him by the next morning.

On next day (26 March), Gurnam Singh submitted his resignation to Governor and Governor accepted his resignation immediately but asked him to continue till an alternative arrangements was made.

== See also ==
- Fifth Punjab Legislative Assembly
- People's United Front (Punjab)
