= Ajit Pal Singh Kohli =

Indian politician

Member of the Punjab Legislative Assembly
- Incumbent
- Assumed office 16 March 2022
- Preceded by: Amarinder Singh
- Constituency: Patiala
- Majority: Aam Aadmi Party

Personal details
- Born: Patiala, Punjab
- Citizenship: Indian
- Party: Aam Aadmi Party

Ajit Pal Singh Kohli is an Indian politician and businessman. He is a former Mayor of and the MLA from Patiala Assembly constituency. He is a leader of the Aam Aadmi Party and serves as the party's state spokesman.

== Political career ==
Ajit Pal Singh Kohli was elected as the MLA in the 2022 Punjab Legislative Assembly election. He represents the Patiala Assembly constituency in the Punjab Legislative Assembly. He defeated the former two-time Chief Minister of Punjab Amarinder Singh in the election by a margin of almost 20,000 votes. He previously served as the Mayor of Patiala Patiala Municipal Corporation from 2007 to 2012. He was appointed one of the nation's youngest mayors at the age of 28.

== Business ==
He holds proprietorship of The Kohli Group of Companies, which is a business conglomerate.

== Educational Background ==
Ajit Pal Singh Kohli attended YPS, Patiala for his school education. He went to St. Stephen's College, Delhi University for his undergraduate degree, followed by an M.A. in Political Science from Punjabi University, Patiala.

== Family background ==
His grandfather, Jathedar Sardara Singh Kohli, who was a prominent senior Taksali-Akali leader in Punjab, served as the Senior Vice President of the SAD. His father, Sardar Surjit Singh Kohli, was appointed to the same position within the SAD in 2021. His grandfather and father both previously served as cabinet ministers in the Government of Punjab, India. The family had a seven-decade-long affiliation with Shiromani Akali Dal before joining Aam Aadmi Party, expressing moral discontent and opposition to the workings of the former. Additionally, his father had resigned from the Punjab cabinet in solidarity with Sardar Gurcharan Singh Tohra, opposing the Badal-led SAD government.

== Social Advocacy ==
He was a founding member and continues to be a part of the Young Progressive Sikh Forum (YPSF), an initiative for helping the underprivileged and empowering them via various welfare initiatives. He is also a member of the Rotary Club. He was highlighted for his service to the indigenous communities of Patiala during the 2020 COVID-19 lockdown.

== Member of Legislative Assembly ==
He represents the Patiala Assembly constituency as MLA in Punjab Assembly.

== Punjab Assembly Committees ==
Committee assignments of Punjab Legislative Assembly

- Member (2022–23) Committee on Local Bodies
- Member (2022–23) Committee on Subordinate Legislation

== Electoral Performance ==
Punjab Assembly election, 2022: Patiala
Party	Candidate	Votes	%	±%
AAP	Ajit Pal Singh Kohli	48,104	46.49	▲27.31
PLC	Amarinder Singh	28,231	27.28	New
SAD	Harpal Juneja	11,835	11.44	▲0.34
INC	Vishnu Sharma	9,871	9.54	▼59.44
NOTA	None of the above	754	0.73	▼0.31
Majority		19,873	19.21	▼30.10
Turnout		103,468	64.00	
Registered electors		161,591		
AAP gain from INC		Swing		

State Legislative Assembly
Preceded by Amarinder Singh (INC)	Member of the Punjab Legislative Assembly from Patiala Assembly constituency 2022 –	Incumbent
