= Narangwal =

Village in Punjab, India

Coordinates: 30°45′N 75°45′E

Narangwal is a village in Ludhiana Punjab, India, where most of the Grewal clan live. The Grewals are mainly Sikhs. The famous school Drishti Dr.R.C.Jain Innovative Public School is in Narangwal.

Sarpanch of the Village- Manjinder Singh Grewal

Numbardaars of the Village-

1. Seat Vacant after Death of S. Gurjit Singh (Patti Bhara Mall)
2. Baljit Kaur Grewal (Patti Raiki)

Famous Personalities of Village Narangwal: 1. Bhai Sahib Bhai Randhir Singh Ji 2. Baba Gurdit Singh Ji Kutia Sahib Wale 3. S. Gurnam Singh (Former Chief Minister of Punjab)

and many more.

== Notable people ==
- Bhai Randhir Singh, Indian Freedom Fighter & Saint
- Gurnam Singh, ex-Chief Minister Punjab
- Jaswinder Singh Grewal, Nehru Planetarium, Ludhiana
- Ram Parsad Singh Grewal, deputy commissioner of Lahore, Delhi and Shimla
