= Randhir Singh (Sikh) =

Indian Sikh leader (1878–1961)

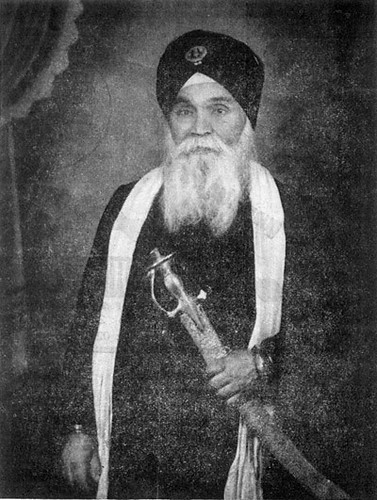
- Photograph of Bhai Randhir Singh posed whilst grasping a sword in his hand
- Born: Basant Singh; 7 July 1878; Narangwal, Punjab, British India
- Died: 13 April 1961 (aged 82)
- Known for: Founder of the Akhand Kirtani Jatha
- Parent(s): Natha Singh; Punjab Kaur

Randhir Singh Narangwal (born as Basant Singh; 7 July 1878 – 13 April 1961) was Sikh leader who started the Gurdwara Sudhaar Movement (lit. 'Gurdwara Improvement Movement') and founded the Akhand Kirtani Jatha. He was also a Punjabi and Hindi-language writer.

== Early life ==
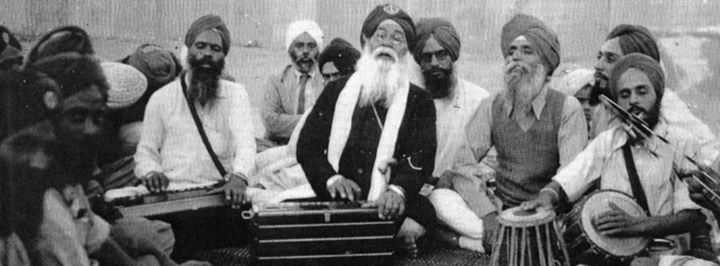
Photograph of Bhai Randhir Singh performing kirtan with followers

Randhir Singh was born as in Narangwal, Ludhiana district, Punjab Province (British India) on 7 July 1878 in a Sikh family to father Natha Singh and mother Punjab Kaur. His father, Natha Singh, worked as a District Inspector of Schools and as a Judge in the High Court of the State of Nabha. His mother, Punjab Kaur, was a direct descendant in the seventh generation of Bhai Bhagtu, a distinguished Sikh of the congregation of Guru Arjan. He completed his schooling in Nabha and higher education from Government and Forman Christian College at Lahore.

== Religious career ==
Singh wrote various books on Sikh theology, philosophy, and the Sikh way of life.

=== Gurdwara Rakabganj wall restoration ===
He was the leader of Sikhs who took part in a strong resistance movement, when in 1914 the British government of India felled a portion of the Rakabganj Gurdwara wall under the beautification plan of the government secretarial buildings in New Delhi. Ultimately the government had to yield against the demand of the Sikhs and the wall was restored.

The whole movement was linked with freedom fighters of the Ghadar Movement 1914-15 and the Lahore Conspiracy Case II.

But Bhai Randhir Singh was charged in 1914 with waging war against the British Crown and had to undergo life-imprisonment from 1914 to 1931.

== Death ==
He died on Vaisakhi, 13 April 1961 and his cremation took place at the lake between Gujjrawal and Narangwal.

== Publications ==
- Gurmat Lekh (1937)
- Gurmat Nam Abhiyas Kamai (1938)
- Jail Chithian (1938)
- Charan Kamal Ki Mauj (1939)
- Kee Sri Guru Granth Sahib Di Puja But Prasti Hai? (1940)
- Anhad Shabad Dasam Duaar (1942)
- Amrit Kallaa
- Gurmat Bibek (1949)
- An-dithi Duniya (1949)
- Karam Philosophy (1951)
- Baba Vayd Rogiaa Da (1952)
- Gurmat Rammjaa (1952)
- Haumai Naavay Naal Virodh Hai
- Temar Aageya Thu Oajara Aerthat Gyan Chanha
- Darshan Jhalkaan
- Granth Prem Sumarg (1953)
- Gurbani diyan Lagaan Matraan dee Vilakhantaa (1954)
- Sant Padh Nirnay (1954)
- Ik Umar Kaidi Da Supna
- Katha Keertan (1957)
- Sikh Itihaas De Partakh Darshan (1958)
- Jhatka Maas Prathai Tat Gurmat Nirnay (1958)
- Sachkhand Darshan (1959)
- Zaharaa zahoor Guru Gobind Singh
- Amrit Ki Hai? (1960)
- Aastak Tei Naastak
- Gagan Oudaree
- Rangle Sajjan
- Jyot Vigaas
- Sikh Kaun Hai?
- Autobiography of Bhai Sahib Randhir Singh - translation by Trilochan Singh (1971)
