= 2021 Punjab, India political crisis =

Political crisis in Indian state of Punjab

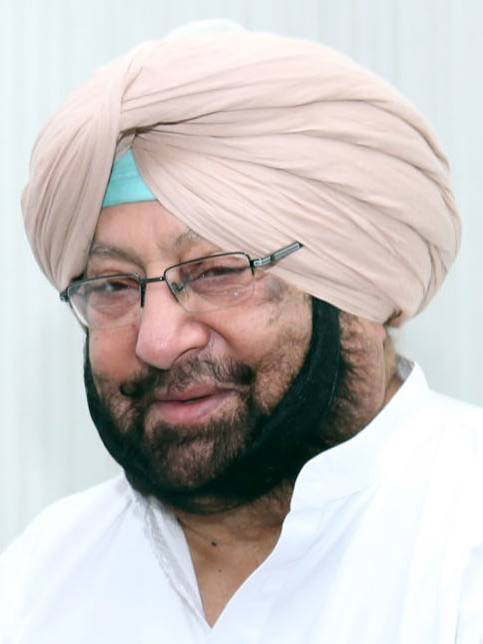
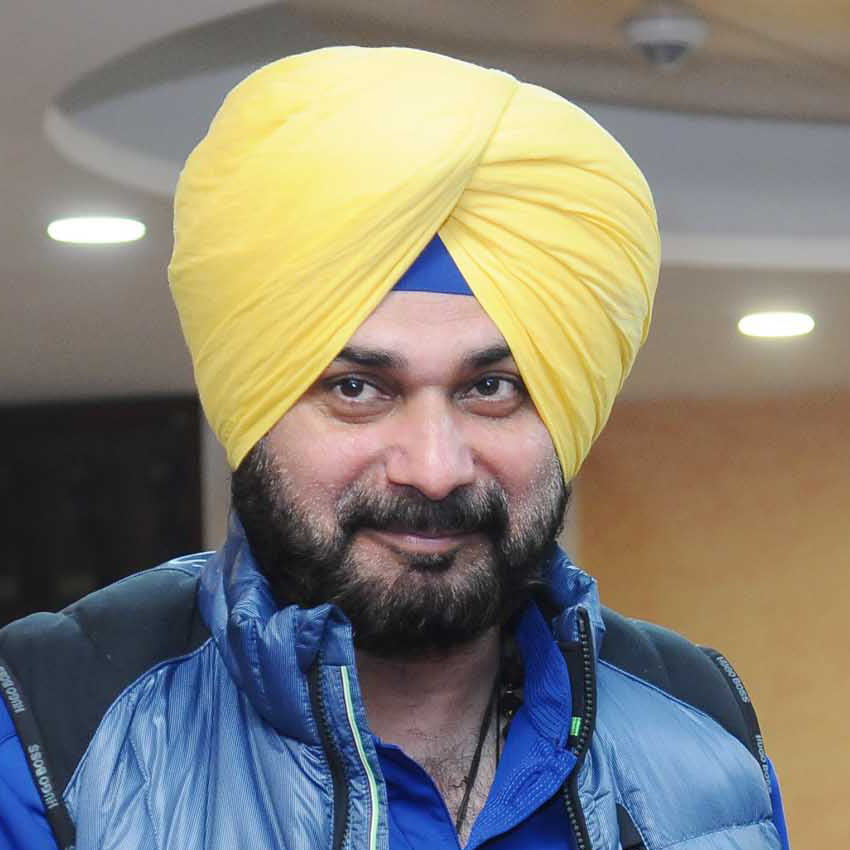
- Date: September 2021
- Location: Punjab, India
- Type: Parliamentary crisis
- Cause: Navjot Singh Sidhu's Pakistan visit and meeting with Imran Khan and Qamar Javed Bajwa; Dispute between Sidhu and Amarinder Singh; Amarinder Singh being blamed by own party colleagues for shielding badals in cases of Sacrilege and Drugs
- Participants: Indian National Congress; Amarinder Singh; Navjot Singh Sidhu; Charanjit Singh Channi; Imran Khan (alleged by Amarinder Singh); Qamar Javed Bajwa (alleged by Amarinder Singh); Inter-Services Intelligence (alleged by Amarinder Singh)
- Outcome: Ideological split in the Indian Punjab state government between Navjot Singh Sidhu and Amarinder Singh; Navjot Singh Sidhu sworn in as the new Punjab Congress chief; Amarinder Singh and his council of ministers resign from the chief minister post; Charanjit Singh Channi made the new chief minister; Navjot Singh Sidhu resigns as the PCC chief; Congress loses 2022 Punjab Legislative Elections to Aam Aadmi Party

On 18 September 2021, several government members of the Punjab Legislative Assembly from Indian National Congress in India attended a Congress Legislative Party (CLP) meeting, which may or may not lead to the change of CM of the Indian National Congress in Punjab.

This led to the resignation of Amarinder Singh from the chief minister post on 18 September 2021 at 4:30 pm.

Apart from Navjot Singh Sidhu, former Punjab Congress unit chiefs Sunil Jakhar and Pratap Bajwa are said to be the frontrunners for the top job in the state, which is scheduled to hold the assembly elections early next year. State ministers Sukhjinder Randhawa, Sukhbinder Singh Sarkaria and Tript Rajinder Singh Bajwa are also said to be the contenders for the chief minister’s post. Names of senior party leaders Ambika Soni, Brahm Mohindra, Vijay Inder Singla, Punjab Congress working president Kuljit Singh Nagra and MP Partap Singh Bajwa are also doing the rounds.

Charanjit Singh Channi was made the next chief minister of Punjab on 19 September 2021.

On 28 September, Navjot Singh Sidhu resigned from the post of PCC chief after APS Deol was appointed as the Punjab advocate general, Iqbal Preet Singh Sahota took charge as the director general of police. Followed by the resignation of new minister Razia Sultana “in solidarity” with him. Gulzar Inder Singh Chahal, who was made the PCC treasurer soon after Sidhu took over, also put in his papers along with the general secretary.

State general secretary Subhash Sharma said Deol was the lawyer of the Behbal Kalan firing accused — ex-DGP Sumedh Saini and suspended IGP Paramraj Umaranangal. “Punjabis are saddened at this as we want a logical conclusion to the sacrilege case,” he said. 10 Days after Sidhu widraw his resignation as Punjab PCC President

According to party insiders, the immediate trigger for Sidhu’s resignation was the inclusion of Rana Gurjit Singh in the Channi cabinet, besides APS Deol's appointment as advocate general. Iqbal Preet Singh Sahota being appointed DGP and the home portfolio going to Sukhjinder Singh Randhawa are his other peeve points, they said.

== Background ==
Amarinder Singh and Navjot Singh Sidhu have been at loggerheads since 2018 when Navjot Singh Sidhu visited Pakistan to attend Imran Khan's swearing-in ceremony and for hugging Pakistan's Chief of the Army Staff of Pakistan Army General Qamar Javed Bajwa. Amarinder Singh, the CM of Punjab was opposed to this and criticized Navjot Singh Sidhu for this. In return, Navjot Singh Sidhu quit from his post and went on a hiatus. In 2021, Navjot Singh Sidhu was made the Punjab Congress Chief which angered Amarinder Singh who wanted Sunil Jakhar to be appointed instead.

It reached a boiling point on 17 September where a CPL meeting was suggested by a large number of Indian National Congress' 80 MLAs. Harish Rawat then announced at that night that a CPL meeting would be held on 18 September where the new chief minister would be decided. Ambika Soni and Sunil Jakhar are in contention whereas it is claimed that Navjot Singh Sidhu will be the new CM face in 2022 before the Vidhan Sabha elections.

Timeline:

2018:

According to reports, Singh was not in the favour of Sidhu when he joined the Congress in 2017 just ahead of the Punjab assembly election. It became a little evident when Sidhu in November 2018 publicly had said, “My captain is Rahul Gandhi, who is also his (Amarinder’s) captain. Wherever I went, it was with his approval."

2019:

Sidhu’s portfolio was changed from the Local Bodies’ to the Ministry of Power and Renewable Energy in this year. However, he did not assume charge of his new department. Singh had cited “inept” handling of local bodies department by Sidhu, which led to the Congress’s poor performance in urban areas, as the reason behind taking away the role. Even the state unit also did not give an election ticket to Sidhu’s wife Navjot Kaur.

The rift became even more evident when reacting to Sidhu’s mannerisms, Singh had said, “Perhaps he is ambitious and wants to be chief minister.”

In the same year, Sidhu resigned from the Punjab Cabinet but what had raised eyebrows at the time was Sidhu’s move to send his resignation letter to Rahul Gandhi.

2020:

Both the leaders met on November 25 over a lunch, triggering speculation that Sidhu may be re-inducted into the state cabinet. A media adviser to the Chief Minister had then said that both leaders spent an hour together at Singh’s residence in Punjab and shared thoughts on various issues.

At that time, it was thought that the tensions between both leaders appeared to have eased when the Chief Minister praised the Amritsar MLA for the way he spoke in the assembly after the Congress government had moved a resolution and brought bills against the farm laws last month.

2021:

Both Singh and Sidhu met on March 18 over a tea for nearly 50 minutes in Mohali after which speculations were rife that the latter will be reinducted into the state cabinet. “It was a good meeting. We have a cordial relation and I am waiting for him to reply. I am sure he will decide on what is in favour of the party and the state," Amarinder Singh has said on being asked about the meeting. He added that he had known Sidhu for decades now and he will do what is good for the party and the state.

However, later in May, Sidhu once again attacked Singh over the 2015 Kotkapura firing, saying the Punjab and Haryana High court’s order to form a new SIT to probe the incident was accepted by the state government to “deflect” people’s attention. “Nefarious intentions are evident, No High Court stopped you in 4-1/2 years! When DGP/CPS appointments are set aside, orders are challenged in Higher Courts in matter of hours. Now, first you attack the High Court, than from backdoor accept same orders to deflect People’s attention," Sidhu had alleged in a tweet.

Sidhu has been targeting the Chief Minister over the alleged delay in delivering justice in the desecration of Guru Granth Sahib and post sacrilege police firing incident.

And in August, Navjot Singh Sidhu's advisers made some statements which angered Amarinder Singh after which Navjot's followers began attacking Amarinder Singh which culminated in more than half of the party's MLAs wanting to oust Amarinder Singh.

== Aftermath ==
This crisis led to the resignation of Amarinder Singh from the chief minister post on 18 September 2021 at 4:30 pm. He met the Punjab governor and submitted his and his council of ministers’ resignation. He then addressed the media at the Raj Bhavan.

The next day, another Congress Legislative Party (CLP) meeting was held and the new chief minister was supposed to be announced by 11 AM. However, no new chief minister has been chosen till now. Ambika Soni, one of the contenders refused to be appointed as the new CM and expressed that the new CM should be from the Sikh community.

=== Formation of Punjab Lok Congress ===
And at other side Captain Amarinder Singh (former Chief Minister of Punjab)formed a new Political party named Punjab Lok Congress and allianced with NDA, also Shiromani Akali Dal Sanyukt alliance with them to contest Punjab Legislative Assembly Elections 2022.

== See also ==
- 1968 Punjab, India political crisis
- Punjab Legislative Assembly
- 2020–2021 Punjab farmers' protest
- 2021 Lynchings for sacrilege in Punjab
