= Punjab Janata Party =

Indian political party

Punjab Janata Party was an Indian political party.

It was formed by Lachhman Singh Gill on 22 November 1967.

Lachhman Singh was a cabinet minister in Gurnam Singh government. Gurnam Singh became the Chief Minister of Punjab after the 1967 Punjab Legislative Assembly election. Lachhman Singh Gill, due to differences with Gurnam Singh, defected with 16 other members and formed Punjab Janata Party.

He formed a minority government with the support of Indian National Congress on 25 November 1967. However, this government lasted for only 9 months. Congress president S. Nijalingappa announced his decision to withdraw support from the government on 21 August 1968. On the same day, Lachhman Singh Gill resigned from the post and President's rule was imposed on 23 August 1968.

In 1969 Assembly election party was only able to win one seat.

== Chief Minister ==
№	Name	Portrait	Term of office (Assembly election)			Party (coalition with)	Appointed by (Governor)
7	Lachhman Singh Gill (Dharamkot)		25 November 1967	23 August 1968	272 days	Punjab Janta Party (INC)	D. C. Pavate
