= Akali Dal – Master Tara Singh Group =

Akali Dal – Tara Singh
- Chairman: Tara Singh
- Founded: 1962
- Dissolved: 7 October 1968
- Merged into: Shiromani Akali Dal

Akali Dal – Master Tara Singh Group was one of several hard-line splinter groups founded by Tara Singh. Akali Dal – Tara Singh was formed in 1962. It was led by Master Tara Singh. The party was a Sikh-centered political party in the Indian state of Punjab. The party was created due to disagreement between Master Tara Singh and Sant Fateh Singh. The party failed to gained control of the Shiromani Gurdwara Prabandhak Committee in October 1962. In the Gurdwara elections in January 1965, the party annexed 45 of the seats, while Sant Fateh Singh's party could manage 90. In 1967 during Punjab Legislative Assembly election Party got only 2 seats and gave their support to Akali Dal Sant Fateh Singh with other Parties and Independents and formed People's United Front and the Government under the leadership of Gurnam Singh but resigned after defection by Lachhman Singh Gill and then both the factions merged and formed Shiromani Akali Dal on 7 October 1968 at Khadur Sahib.
