= 1969 Punjab Legislative Assembly election =

- 1969

All 104 seats in the Punjab Legislative Assembly 53 seats needed for a majority
- Turnout: 72.27%
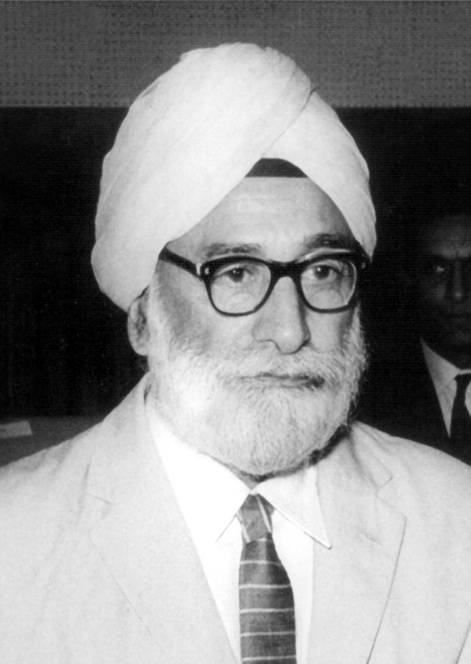

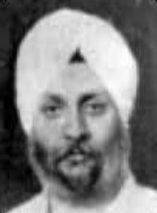

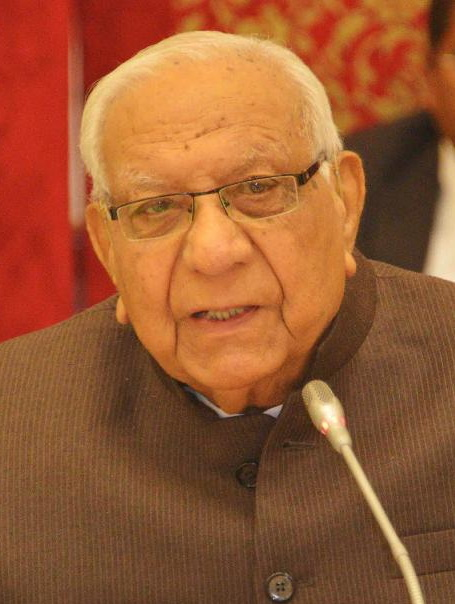
	First party	Second party	Third party
Leader	Gurnam Singh	Harinder Singh	Balram Das Tandon
Party	SAD	INC(R)	ABJS
Leader's seat	Qila Raipur (won)	Ajnala (won)	Amritsar Central (won)
Seats won	43	38	8
Seat change	▲43	▼10	▼1
Popular vote	1,381,916	1,844,360	4,24,008
Percentage	29.36%	39.18%	9.01%
Swing	▲29.36%	▲1.73%	▼0.83%
Chief Minister before election
President's rule
Elected Chief Minister
Gurnam Singh
SAD

Legislative Assembly elections were held in the Indian state of Punjab in 1969. Shiromani Akali Dal emerged as the largest party in the Assembly, winning 43 of the 104 seats. The Bharatiya Jana Sangh was also a part of the government as it was in a pre-poll alliance with the Shiromani Akali Dal party.

== Result ==
Party	Contested	Seats won	Change in seats	Popular vote	%
Shiromani Akali Dal	65	43	▲43	13,81,916	29.36
Indian National Congress	103	38	▼10	18,44,360	39.18
Bharatiya Jana Sangh	30	8	▼1	4,24,008	9.01
Communist Party of India	28	4	▼1	2,27,600	4.84
Communist Party of India (Marxist)	10	2	▼1	1,44,610	3.07
Socialist Party	7	2	▲1	39,109	0.83
Punjab Janata Party	16	1	▲1	79,269	1.68
Praja Socialist Party	3	1	▲1	23,617	0.50
Swatantra Party	6	1	▲1	43,006	0.91
Independents	160	4	▼5	4,18,232	8.89
Others	43	0		81,359	1.72
Total	471	104		47,07,086	
Source: ECI

== Elected members ==
Constituency	Reserved for (SC/None)	Member	Party
Muktsar	SC	Guruev Singh	Shiromani Akali Dal
Giddar Baha	None	Parkash Singh	Shiromani Akali Dal
Malout	None	Gurmit Singh	Shiromani Akali Dal
Lambi	SC	Dana Ram	Communist Party of India
Abohar	None	Satya Dev	Bharatiya Jana Sangh
Fazilka	None	Radha Krishan	Indian National Congress
Jalalabad	None	Lajinder Singh	Indian National Congress
Guru Har Sahai	None	Lachhman Singh	Indian National Congress
Ferozepur	None	Balmukand	Bharatiya Jana Sangh
Ferozepur Cantonment	None	Mohinder Singh	Shiromani Akali Dal
Zira	None	Metab Singh	Indian National Congress
Dharamkot	None	Lachhman Singh	Punjab Janta Party
Nihal Singh Wala	SC	Dalip Singh	Indian National Congress
Moga	None	Roop Lal	Samyukta Socialist Party
Bagha Purana	None	Tej Singh	Indian National Congress
Khadoor Sahib	None	Mohan Singh	Shiromani Akali Dal
P A T T I	None	Surinder Singh	Shiromani Akali Dal
Valtoha	None	Gurdip Singh	Indian National Congress
Atari	SC	Darshan Singh	Communist Party of India
Tarn Taran	None	Manjinder Singh	Shiromani Akali Dal
Beas	None	Hari Singh	Shiromani Akali Dal
Jandiala	SC	Tara Singh	Shiromani Akali Dal
Amritsar East	None	Gian Chand	Indian National Congress
Amritsar South	None	Kirpal Singh	Praja Socialist Party
Amritsar Central	None	Balram Dass	Bharatiya Jana Sangh
Amritsar West	None	Satya Pal	Communist Party of India
Verka	SC	Gurmej Singh	Indian National Congress
Majitha	None	Shashpal Singh	Shiromani Akali Dal
Ajnala	None	Harinder Singh	Indian National Congress
Fatehgarh	None	Santokh Singh	Indian National Congress
Batala	None	Bikaramajit Singh	Bharatiya Jana Sangh
Sirihargobindpur	None	Karam Singh	Shiromani Akali Dal
Qadian	None	Satnam Singh	Shiromani Akali Dal
Dhariwal	None	Pritam Singh	Shiromani Akali Dal
Gurdaspur	None	Mohinder Singh	Shiromani Akali Dal
Dina Nagar	SC	Gian Chand	Bharatiya Jana Sangh
Narot Mehra	SC	Sunder Singh	Indian National Congress
Pathankot	None	Ram Singh	Indian National Congress
Balachaur	None	Tulsi Ram	Indian National Congress
Garhshankar	None	Rattan Singh	Indian National Congress
Mahilpur	SC	Kartar Singh	Shiromani Akali Dal
Hoshiarpur	None	Balbir Singh	Samyukta Socialist Party
Sham Chaurasi	SC	Guran Dass	Indian National Congress
Tanda	None	Amir Singh Kalkat	Indian National Congress
Dasuya	None	Devinder Singh	Shiromani Akali Dal
Mukerian	None	Kewal Krishan	Indian National Congress
Kapurthala	None	Bawa Harnam Singh	Shiromani Akali Dal
Sultanpur	None	Atma Singh	Shiromani Akali Dal
Phagwara	SC	Sadhu Ram	Indian National Congress
Jullundur North	None	Gurdial Saini	Indian National Congress
Jullundur South	None	Man Mohan Kalia	Bharatiya Jana Sangh
Jullundur Cantonment	None	Saroop Singh	Indian National Congress
Adampur	None	Kulwant Singh	Communist Party of India
Kartarpur	SC	Gurbanta Singh	Indian National Congress
Jamsher	SC	Darshan Singh Kaypee	Indian National Congress
Nakodar	None	Darbara Singh	Independent
Nurmahal	None	Balwant Singh	Shiromani Akali Dal
Bara Pind	None	Umrao Singh	Indian National Congress
Banga	SC	Jagat Ram	Indian National Congress
Nawan Shahr	None	Dilbag Singh	Indian National Congress
Phillaur	None	Surjit Singh Atwal	Indian National Congress
Jagraon	None	Nahar Singh	Indian National Congress
Raikot	None	Jagdev Singh	Shiromani Akali Dal
Qila Raipur	None	Gurnam Singh	Shiromani Akali Dal
Dakha	SC	Basant Singh	Shiromani Akali Dal
Ludhiana North	None	Sardari Lal	Indian National Congress
Ludhiana South	None	Joginder Paul	Indian National Congress
Kum Kalan	None	Partap Singh	Shiromani Akali Dal
Payal	None	Beant Singh	Independent
Khanna	SC	Naurang Singh	Shiromani Akali Dal
Samrala	None	Kapur Singh	Shiromani Akali Dal
Nangal	None	Bam Dev	Bharatiya Jana Sangh
Anandpur Sahib	None	Sadhu Singh	Indian National Congress
Ropar	None	Ravi Indar Singh	Shiromani Akali Dal
Morinda	SC	Raja Singh	Shiromani Akali Dal
Kharar	None	Sarjit Singh	Shiromani Akali Dal
Banur	None	Balbir Singh	Independent
Rajpura	None	Harbans Lal	Bharatiya Jana Sangh
Raipur	None	Jasdev Singh	Shiromani Akali Dal
Patiala	None	Ravel Singh S/o Tara Singh	Shiromani Akali Dal
Dakala	None	Basant Singh	Swatantra Party
Samana	SC	Pritam Singh	Shiromani Akali Dal
Nabha	None	Narinder Singh	Independent
Amloh	SC	Dalip Singh	Shiromani Akali Dal
Sirhind	None	Randhir Singh	Shiromani Akali Dal
Dhuri	None	Sant Singh	Indian National Congress
Malerkotla	None	Nawab Iftikhar Ali Khan	Shiromani Akali Dal
Sherpur	SC	Kundan Singh	Shiromani Akali Dal
Barnala	None	Surjeet Singh	Shiromani Akali Dal
Bhadaur	SC	Bachan Singh	Indian National Congress
Dhanaula	None	Hardit Singh	Communist Party of India
Sangrur	None	Gurbakshs Singh	Indian National Congress
Sunam	None	Gurbachan Singh	Shiromani Akali Dal
Lehra	None	Harchand Singh	Shiromani Akali Dal
Sardulgarh	None	Kirpal Singh	Indian National Congress
Budhlada	None	Parshotam Singh	Shiromani Akali Dal
Mansa	None	Sant Lakha Singh	Shiromani Akali Dal
Talwandi Sabo	None	Ajit Singh	Indian National Congress
Pakka Kalan	None	Trilochan Singh	Indian National Congress
Bhatinda	None	Teja Singh	Shiromani Akali Dal
Phul	None	Babu Singh	Communist Party of India
Nathana	SC	Hardit Singh	Shiromani Akali Dal
Kot Kapura	None	Harcharan Singh	Indian National Congress
Faridkot	SC	Bhagat Singh	Shiromani Akali Dal

== See also ==
- Fifth Punjab Legislative Assembly
- Politics of Punjab
- Elections in Punjab
- List of constituencies of the Punjab Legislative Assembly
- 1969 elections in India
