= Gurmukh Singh Musafir =

Indian politician (1899–1976)

Giani Gurmukh Singh Musafir
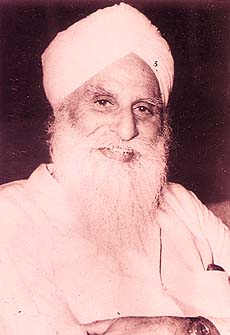

Jathedar of the Akal Takht
- In office 1930–1931
- Preceded by: Jawaher Singh Mattu Bhaike
- Succeeded by: Vasakha Singh Dadehar

5th Chief Minister of Punjab
- In office 11 November 1966 – 8 March 1967
- Preceded by: Ram Kishan
- Succeeded by: Gurnam Singh

Member of Parliament, Lok Sabha
- In office 1952–1966
- Succeeded by: Yagya Dutt Sharma
- Constituency: Amritsar, Punjab

Member of Parliament, Rajya Sabha
- In office 1968–1976
- Constituency: Punjab

Personal details
- Born: Gurmukh Singh; 15 January 1899 Adhwal, Punjab, British India present-day Adhwal, Rawalpindi Tehsil, Pakistani Punjab
- Died: 18 January 1976 (aged 77) Delhi, India
- Party: Indian National Congress, Shiromani Akali Dal
- Spouse: Ranjit Kaur

Gurmukh Singh Musafir (15 January 1899 – 18 January 1976) was an Indian politician and Punjabi language writer. He was the 5th Chief Minister of Punjab from 1 November 1966 to 8 March 1967.

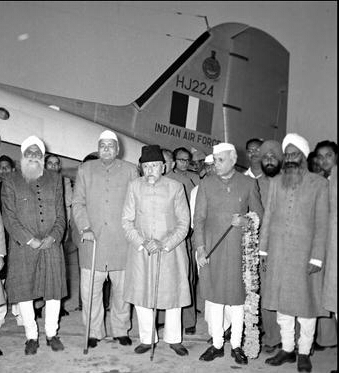
Giani Gurmukh Singh Musafir (left) with Govind Ballabh Pant, Abul Kalam Azad, Jawaharlal Nehru and Partap Singh Kairon on 6 February 1956.

He was awarded the Sahitya Akademi Award in Punjabi, given by Sahitya Akademi, India's National Academy of Letters in 1978 for his short story collection, Urvar Par and was posthumously decorated with Padma Vibhushan, the second highest Indian civilian award given by Government of India.

== Early life ==
Musafir was born on 15 January 1899 at Adhwal, in Campbellpore (now called Attock district of Punjab province in British India (presently Rawalpindi District of Punjab Province in Pakistan) - in a small land-holding farming family of Khatri of Chadha clan.

He completed primary education from the village primary school and then went to Rawalpindi to pass the middle school examination. In 1918, he became a teacher at Khalsa High School, Kallar. His four years there as a teacher earned him the epithet Giani, Musafir being the pseudonym he had adopted. In 1922, he gave up teaching and joined the Akali agitation for Gurudwara reform. For taking part in the Guru ka Bagh agitation in 1922, he underwent imprisonment.

He was appointed to the highest religious office of Sikhism Jathedar of the Akal Takht from 12 March 1930 to 5 March 1931.

== Political career ==
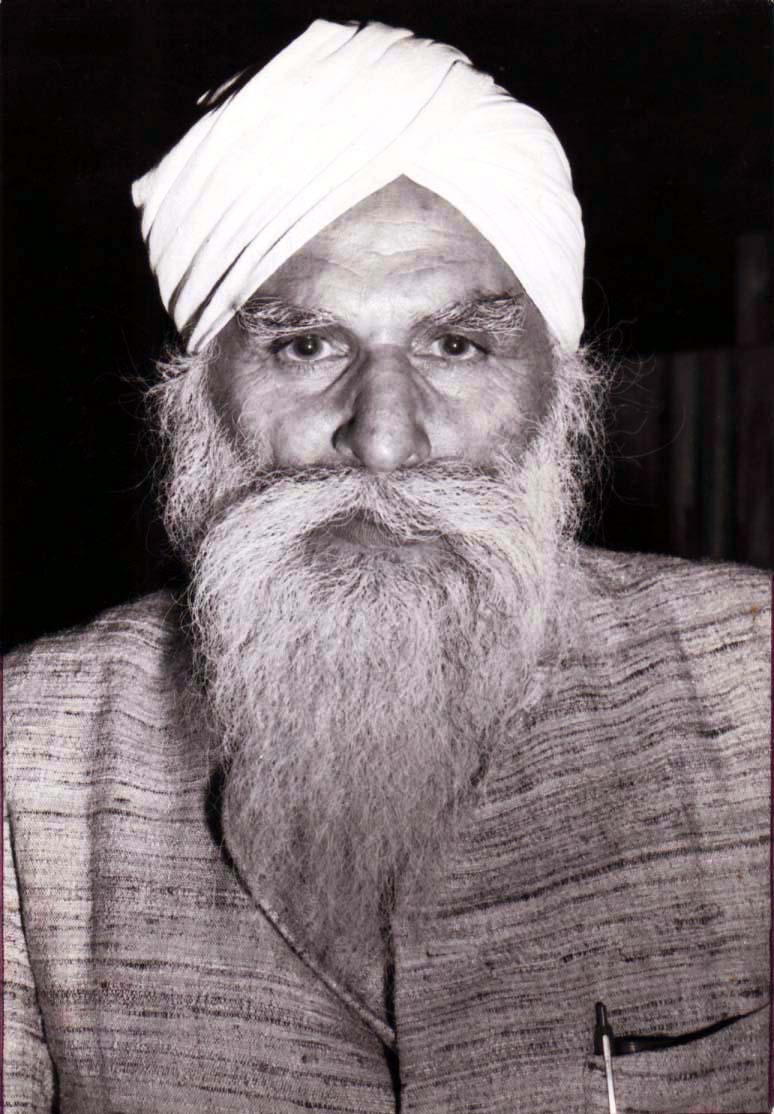

Musafir joined the freedom movement in the early 1920s and courted arrest several times till 1947. He courted arrest in the Civil disobedience movement in 1930. He became the head of Akal Takht, central seat of religious authority for the Sikhs. He held this office from 12 March 1930 to 5 March 1931. He also served for a time as secretary of the Shiromani Gurdwara Parbandhak Committee as well as general secretary of the Shiromani Akali Dal. He also courted arrest as part of Satyagraha and Quit India movements.

In 1949, he became the President of the Punjab Pradesh Congress Committee. He held the office of the President for 12 years and was also an elected member of the Congress Working Committee. He was elected to the Lok Sabha in 1952, 1957 and 1962, representing Amritsar constituency. In 1966, he resigned from the Lok Sabha and became the Chief Minister of Punjab state after its re-organization. In 1967, he contested the Vidhan Sabha election from Amritsar constituency, but he was defeated by Satyapal Dang of the Communist Party of India. He was the member of the Rajya Sabha from 1968 to 1974. Musafir died in Delhi on 18 January 1976. He was posthumously awarded Padma Vibhushan in 1976.

Musafir was a member of the Indian delegations to the International Peace Conference in Stockholm in 1954, World Peace Conference in Helsinki in 1965, and the World Peace Conference in Berlin in 1969. He also led the Indian delegations to the World Progressive Writers Conference in Japan in 1961 and the Indian Writers Afro-Asian Conference in Baku in 1965.

== Role in Constituent Assembly of India ==
Musafir was elected to the Constituent Assembly from Congress Party. In the Constituent Assembly he spoke on the issues of citizenship and separate electorates.

== Offices held ==
- Member of A.I.C.C, since 1930
- Member of Constituent Assembly – 1946–52
- Member of Lok Sabha – 1952–57, 1957–62, 1962–66
- President, Punjab Pradesh Congress Committee- 1947–59
- Member, Working Committee A.I.C.C – 1952–57
- Member, Executive Committee of the Congress Party in Parliament – 1952–1966
- Member Jallianwala Bagh Memorial Committee since its inception
- Chairman Reception Committee, Sixty- first session of the Indian National Congress held at Amritsar in 1956
- Member, Legislative Council Punjab – 1966–68
- Chief Minister, Punjab – 1966–67
- Rajya Sabha member in April 1968 and April 1974

== Writer and poet ==
Musafir was also a poet and writer. His writings became profile following the massacre of Jallianwala Bagh when he wrote about the Indian National struggle. While he is more famous for being a politician, noted Punjabi critics like Kartar Singh Duggal, Raghbir Singh Sirjana and Gurbhajan Gill have all spoken about Musafir's contribution to Punjabi literature, particularly his work during the freedom struggle.

His published works include nine collections of poems (Sabar De Bann, Prem Ban, Jivan Pandh, Musdfaridn, Tutte Khambh, Kadve Sunehe, Sahaj Sumel, Vakkhrd Vakkhrd Katrd Katrd and Duur Nerhe); eight of short stories (Vakkhn Duma, Ahlane de Bot, Kandhdn Bol Paidn; Satdl Janvari; Allah Vale, Gutdr, Sabh Achchhd, and Sastd Tamdshd); and four biographical works (Vekhya Sunya Gandhi, Vekhya Sunya Nehru, BaghlJamail and Vehvin Sadi de Shahid). He represented Indian writers at international conferences at Stockholm in 1954, and at Tokyo in 1961.

He recorded the reminiscences of his association with Mohandas Gandhi and Jawaharlal Nehru in two separate volumes – Vekhya Sunya Gandhi (Gandhi as I knew him), "Vekhya Sunya Nehru" (Nehru as I knew him). His book Martyrs of 20th Century is the result of 30 years of research. Most of his poetry and short stories were written while in jail. He also translated Gandhi Gita and James Allen's Byways of Blessedness titled Anand Marg.

== Death ==
On 17 January 1976, Giani Gurmukh Singh experienced a massive heart-attack after dining with his friends in the house of Sir Sobha Singh in New Delhi.
