= Fateh Singh (Sikh leader) =

Sikh leader (1911–1972)

- Born: 27 October 1911; Badiala, Punjab (British India)
- Died: 30 October 1972 (aged 61); Amritsar, Punjab (India)
- Known for: key figure in the Punjabi Suba movement
- Title: Sant
- Political party: Shiromani Akali Dal

Fateh Singh (27 October 1911 – 30 October 1972) was an Indian Sikh religious and political leader, and a key figure in the Punjabi Suba movement. He was revered as Sant Fateh Singh among his followers.

== Early life ==
Fateh Singh was of a Jat background. Fateh Singh was the son of Channan Singh, a resident of Badiala in Bathinda district of Punjab. Fateh Singh did not have any formal schooling, but he started learning to read and write Punjabi language at the age of 13. He expressed deep interest in the Sikh scriptures, as a result of which his father apprenticed him to a Sikh scholar named Ishar Singh. Later, Fateh Singh migrated to the Ganganagar in the princely state of Bikaner (now in Rajasthan). He toured the nearby villages, preaching the Sikh faith. He also promoted education among the citizens, and established several gurdwaras and schools, besides an orphanage.

== Punjabi Suba movement ==
In the 1950s, Singh entered politics when he started supporting the concept of "Punjabi Suba", a separate state for the Punjabi speakers in India. By the late 1950s, Fateh Singh had become the senior vice-president of the Shiromani Akali Dal, and had led several marches supporting the Punjabi Suba movement. On 18 December 1960, he started a fast-unto-death in support of his demand. Several prominent Indian leaders tried to convince him to abandon his fast. He ended his fast on 9 January 1961, after the Indian Prime Minister Jawaharlal Nehru issued a statement indicating the support for establishment of a Punjabi Suba. Paul R. Brass, the Professor Emeritus of Political Science and South Asian Studies at the University of Washington, opines that the Sikh leader Fateh Singh tactically stressed the linguistic basis of the demand, while downplaying the religious basis for the demand—a state where the distinct Sikh identity could be preserved.

In July 1962, Fateh Singh broke away from the prominent Sikh leader Master Tara Singh, and formed his own Akali Dal. On 2 October 1962, his party gained control of the Shiromani Gurdwara Prabandhak Committee. In the Gurdwara elections on 17 January 1965, Fateh Singh's party annexed 90 of the seats, while Master Tara Singh's party could manage only 45.

After a few unsatisfactory meetings with Nehru and then Lal Bahadur Shastri who became prime minister after death of Nehru in 1964, on 16 August 1965, Fateh Singh threatened another fast-undo-death and self-immolation, if a Punjabi Suba was not created. However, after the Indo-Pakistani War of 1965 broke out, he decided to postpone his fast, and asked his followers to support the government in this need of hour.

After the war ended, the Government of India set up a Cabinet Committee consisting of Indira Gandhi, Mahavir Tyagi and Yashwantrao Chavan to consider the Punjabi Suba proposal. On Fateh Singh's request, a Parliamentary Consultative Committee headed by the Lok Sabha speaker Sardar Hukam Singh was also constituted for the same purpose. The report of the Hukam Singh committee was made public on 18 January 1966, recommending the reorganisation of the Punjab state on linguistic basis. When Indira Gandhi became the Prime Minister after Lal Bahadur Shastri's death, she agreed to the Punjabi Suba proposal. On 3 September 1966, the Punjab Reorganization Bill was introduced in the Lok Sahha and the modern Punjab state came into being on 1 November 1966.

However, Fateh Singh was not happy about Chandigarh and some other Punjabi-speaking areas being left out of Punjab. He threatened a fast starting from 17 December 1966 and self-immolation on 27 December 1966, if his demands were not met. Hukam Singh and Giani Gurmukh Singh Musafir (the Chief Minister of the Punjab) persuaded him to end his fast on behalf of Indira Gandhi, and Fateh Singh ended his fast on 27 December 1966.

Fateh Singh's influence began to decline in the late 1960s. He started another fast-unto-death on 26 January 1970, demanding the inclusion of Chandigarh into Punjab, but ended it on 30 January. He announced his retirement from politics on 25 March 1972, and died in Amritsar a few months later, on 30 October 1972.
