= Lachhman Singh Gill =

Indian politician

Sardar Lachhman Singh Gill
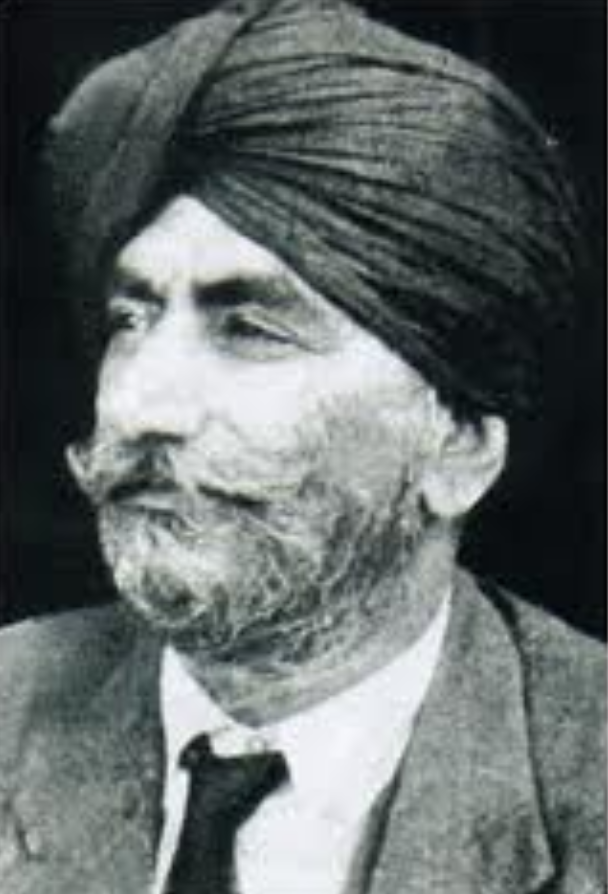

7th Chief Minister of Punjab
- In office 25 November 1967 – 22 August 1968
- Preceded by: Gurnam Singh
- Succeeded by: President's rule

Minister for Education and Revenue
- In office 8 March 1967 – 22 November 1967

Personal details
- Born: 1917 Jagraon, Punjab, British India
- Died: 26 April 1969 (aged 51–52) Chandigarh, India
- Party: Punjab Janta Party (from 1967)
- Other political affiliations: Shiromani Akali Dal (till 1967)

Lachhman Singh Gill (1917 – 26 April 1969) was an Indian politician who served as the 7th Chief Minister of Punjab. He remained in this post from 25 November 1967 to 22 August 1968. He was a member of Shiromani Akali Dal(SAD), a Sikh-centered regional political party in Punjab.

== Early life and career ==
He was born at Chuhar Chakk Village in Moga district in 1917. Before joining politics he worked in the Punjab Works Department, Punjab, he also contracted many buildings in Delhi during the 1940s under the guidance of famed Sikh contractor and businessman, Sardar Bahadur Sir Sobha Singh. He left the contracting business after joining the Punjabi Suba Movement in the 1950s.

He became a member of the executive committee of the Shiromani Gurdwara Parbandhak Committee (SGPC) in 1960. In 1966, he became a member of the Sikh Educational Committee for the management of Sikh colleges. In 1961, he became general secretary of the SGPC.

== Chief Ministership ==
In the 1962 General Elections for Punjab Legislative Assembly he won from Jagraon constituency. He again got elected from Dharamkot in 1967 in the newly restructured Punjab. In the subsequent United front government led by Akali Dal, he was appointed education minister and Justice Gurnam Singh became Chief Minister. On 22 November 1967, Lachhman Singh Gill revolted against the Gurnam Singh government and defected with 16 MLA's. With the support of Congress he formed a minority government on 25 November 1967. However Congress pulled their support on 21 August 1968 and the government fell. President's rule was imposed in Punjab on 23 August. The major decision of Lachhman Singh Gill's government was to make Punjabi the official language of Punjab from 13 April 1968 onward.

== Death ==
He died of a heart attack at Chandigarh on 26 April 1969.

Political offices
Preceded by Justice Gurnam Singh	Chief Minister of Punjab; 25 November 1967 to 22 August 1968	Succeeded by President's rule
