= Gurnam Singh =

Indian politician

Gurnam Singh Grewal

6th Chief Minister of Punjab
- In office 8 March 1967 – 25 November 1967
- Preceded by: Giani Gurmukh Singh Mussafir
- Succeeded by: Lachhman Singh Gill
- In office 17 February 1969 – 27 March 1970
- Preceded by: President's rule
- Succeeded by: Parkash Singh Badal

Leader of opposition in Punjab assembly
- In office 11 March 1962 – 5 July 1966
- Preceded by: Gopal Singh Khalsa
- Succeeded by: President rule
- In office 1 November 1966 – 8 March 1967
- Preceded by: President rule
- Succeeded by: Gian Singh Rarewala
- In office 24 November 1967 – 23 August 1968
- Preceded by: Gian Singh Rarewala
- Succeeded by: Harinder Singh

Personal details
- Born: 25 February 1899 Narangwal, Punjab, British India
- Died: 31 May 1973 (aged 74) Delhi, India
- Party: Shiromani Akali Dal
- Profession: Politician
- Website: https://www.gurnamsingh.org/

Gurnam Singh Grewal (25 February 1899 – 31 May 1973) was an Indian politician and the 6th Chief Minister of Punjab from 8 March 1967 to 25 November 1967, and again between 17 February 1969 to 27 March 1970. He was the first Shiromani Akali Dal Chief minister of Punjab. His ministry fell due to defection of Lachhman Singh Gill, who became the next Chief Minister with the support of the Indian National Congress. He died in an air crash in Delhi on 31 May 1973.

== Early life ==
Singh was born in Narangwal, Ludhiana on 25 February 1899 in a Grewal Jatt family. He graduated from the Forman Christian College, Lahore. He captained the hockey team of Punjab University.

== Law career ==
Singh practiced Law in Lyallpur (Present day Faisalabad, Pakistan). Later he served as the president of the Bar Association, there. During the partition of Punjab, Singh moved to Punjab, India. He was made the judge of the PEPSU and Punjab High Courts in 1950. He retired from this post in 1959.

== Political career ==
In 1959, he joined Shiromani Akali Dal. In 1962, he became the member of Punjab Vidhan Sabha from Raikot. He defeated congress candidate Inder Mohan Singh. Akali Dal president Sant Fateh Singh made Gurnam Singh the head of the legislative wing of the party. He served as the leader of opposition in Punjab Vidhan Sabha from 1962 to 1967. In 1967, he won from Qila Raipur constituency, which he defended in 1969 too. In 1967 he became the first non-Congress Chief Minister of Punjab of Punjab. He led a coalition government of Akali Dal, Jana Sangh and communists. However, his government could not complete the full term. He again became chief minister in 1969. Later he served as High Commissioner of India in Canberra, Australia.

Punjab Legislative Assembly Election, 1962: Raikot
Party	Candidate	Votes	%	±%
SAD	Gurnam Singh	23,195		
INC	Inder Singh	16,947		
Majority		6,248		
Turnout				
Registered electors				
SAD gain from INC		Swing		

== Death ==
Singh died in an air crash in Delhi on 31 May 1973.
