= 1952 Patiala and East Punjab States Union Legislative Assembly election =

- 27 March 1952

All 60 seats in the Patiala and East Punjab States Union Legislative Assembly 31 seats needed for a majority
- Registered: 1,763,531
- Turnout: 58.93%
	Majority party	Minority party
	INC
Party	INC	SAD
Seats won	26	19
Popular vote	28.66	23.44%
CM before election
Raghbir Singh
INC
Elected CM
Gian Singh Rarewala

Indian administrative divisions, as of 1951

Elections to the Patiala and East Punjab States Union Legislative Assembly were held on 27 March 1952. 374 candidates competed for the 50 constituencies in the Assembly. There were 10 two-member constituencies and 40 single-member constituencies.

== Results ==
Summary of results of the 1952 Patiala & East Punjab States Union Legislative Assembly election
Political party	Flag	Seats Contested	Won	% of Seats	Votes	Vote %
Indian National Congress		51	26	43.33	3,88,185	28.66
Shiromani Akali Dal		41	19	31.67	3,17,502	23.44
Bharatiya Jana Sangh		23	2	3.33	43,809	3.23
Kisan Mazdoor Praja Party		15	1	1.67	20,179	1.49
Communist Party of India		14	2	3.33	64,652	4.77
Lal Communist Party Hind Union		5	1	1.67	21,539	1.59
Scheduled Caste Federation		7	1	1.67	47,216	3.49
Independent		188	8	13.33	3,96,956	29.31
Total seats		60	Voters	22,98,385	Turnout	13,54,476 (58.93%)

== Elected members ==
#	Constituency	Member	Party
1	Faridkot	Hazura Singh	Independent
2	Kot Kapura Jaitu	Ranjit Singh	Indian National Congress
2	Kot Kapura Jaitu	Manjitinder Singh	Independent
3	Bhatinda Saddar	Pritam Singh	Shiromani Akali Dal
4	Nahianwala	Harbans Lal	Indian National Congress
5	Rama	Jang Singh	Shiromani Akali Dal
6	Maur	Bhupinder Singh	Shiromani Akali Dal
7	Mansa	Bali Singh	Shiromani Akali Dal
7	Mansa	Harchand Singh	Shiromani Akali Dal
8	Sardul Garh	Inder Singh	Shiromani Akali Dal
9	Bhiki	Bakhshish Singh	Shiromani Akali Dal
10	Budhlada Bareta	Des Raj	Indian National Congress
11	Mahal Kalan	Dhanna Singh	Shiromani Akali Dal
11	Mahal Kalan	Arjan Singh	Communist Party of India
12	Sehna Phul	Gurdial Singh	Shiromani Akali Dal
13	Dhanaula	Sampuran Singh	Indian National Congress
14	Barnala	Raghbir Parkash	Indian National Congress
15	Sherpur	Hira Singh	Shiromani Akali Dal
16	Dhuri	Tirath Singh	Indian National Congress
17	Malerkotla	Iftikharali Khan	Independent
18	Ahmadgarh	Kartar Singh	Shiromani Akali Dal
19	Sangrur	Gajjan Singh	Shiromani Akali Dal
20	Bhawanigarh	Baldev Singh	Shiromani Akali Dal
21	Narwana Klait	Bhale Ram	Indian National Congress
21	Narwana Klait	Kali Ram	Indian National Congress
22	Sunam	Bachan Singh	Lal Communist Party Hind Union
23	Lehra	Pritam Singh	Shiromani Akali Dal
23	Lehra	Brish Bhan	Indian National Congress
24	Uchana	Inder Singh	Indian National Congress
25	Jind	Dal Singh	Indian National Congress
26	Safidon	Inder Singh	Indian National Congress
27	Julana	Ram Singh	Kisan Mazdoor Praja Party
28	Kandaghat	Ranjit Singh	Independent
28	Kandaghat	Lekh Ram	Independent
29	Banur	Harchand Singh	Indian National Congress
29	Banur	Bishan Nath	Indian National Congress
30	Rajpura	Prem Singh	Indian National Congress
31	Patiala City	Jaswant Singh	Shiromani Akali Dal
32	Ghanaur	Kirpal Singh	Indian National Congress
33	Patiala Saddar	Raghbir Singh	Indian National Congress
34	Bhadson	Dara Singh	Shiromani Akali Dal
35	Nabha	Gurbhajnik Singh	Shiromani Akali Dal
36	Samana	Fateh Singh	Indian National Congress
37	Bassi	Gurdial Singh	Shiromani Akali Dal
38	Sirhind	Balwant Singh	Indian National Congress
39	Amloh Payal	Mihan Singh	Scheduled Castes Federation
39	Amloh Payal	Gian Singh	Independent
40	Phagwara	Sadhu Ram	Indian National Congress
40	Phagwara	Hans Raj	Indian National Congress
41	Sultanpur	Atma Singh	Shiromani Akali Dal
42	Kapurthala	Thakar Singh	Indian National Congress
43	Dhilwan	Basawa Singh	Communist Party of India
44	Dadri	Harnam	Indian National Congress
44	Dadri	Nihal Singh	Indian National Congress
45	Badra Satnali	Attar Singh	Independent
46	Kanina	Onkar Singh	Bharatiya Jana Sangh
47	Mohindergarh	Kahan Singh	Bharatiya Jana Sangh
48	Ateli	Manohar Sham	Indian National Congress
49	Narnaul	Ramsaran Chand	Indian National Congress
50	Nangal Chaudhri	Devkinandan	Independent

== United Democratic Front ==
After the elections, Congress party emerged as the single largest party, but in the absence of majority, Gian Singh Rarewala formed the government with the support of Akali Dal, Communist Party of India, Lal Communist Party Hind Union, Kisan Mazdoor Praja Party and Independents on 22 April 1952. The coalition was named as United Democratic Front. Thus, he became the first non-Congress Chief Minister of any state in independent India.

== See also ==
- Patiala and East Punjab States Union Legislative Assembly
- 1951–52 elections in India
- 1952 Punjab Legislative Assembly election
- 1954 Patiala and East Punjab States Union Legislative Assembly election
