= Sangrur Lok Sabha constituency =

Lok Sabha constituency in Punjab

Coordinates: 30.2°N 75.8°E

Sangrur PB-13
- Lok Sabha constituency
- Interactive Map Outlining Sangrur Lok Sabha constituency

Constituency details
- Country: India
- State: Punjab
- Assembly constituencies: Lehra; Dirba; Sunam; Bhadaur; Barnala; Mehal Kalan; Malerkotla; Dhuri; Sangrur
- Established: 1952
- Reservation: None

Member of Parliament
- 18th Lok Sabha
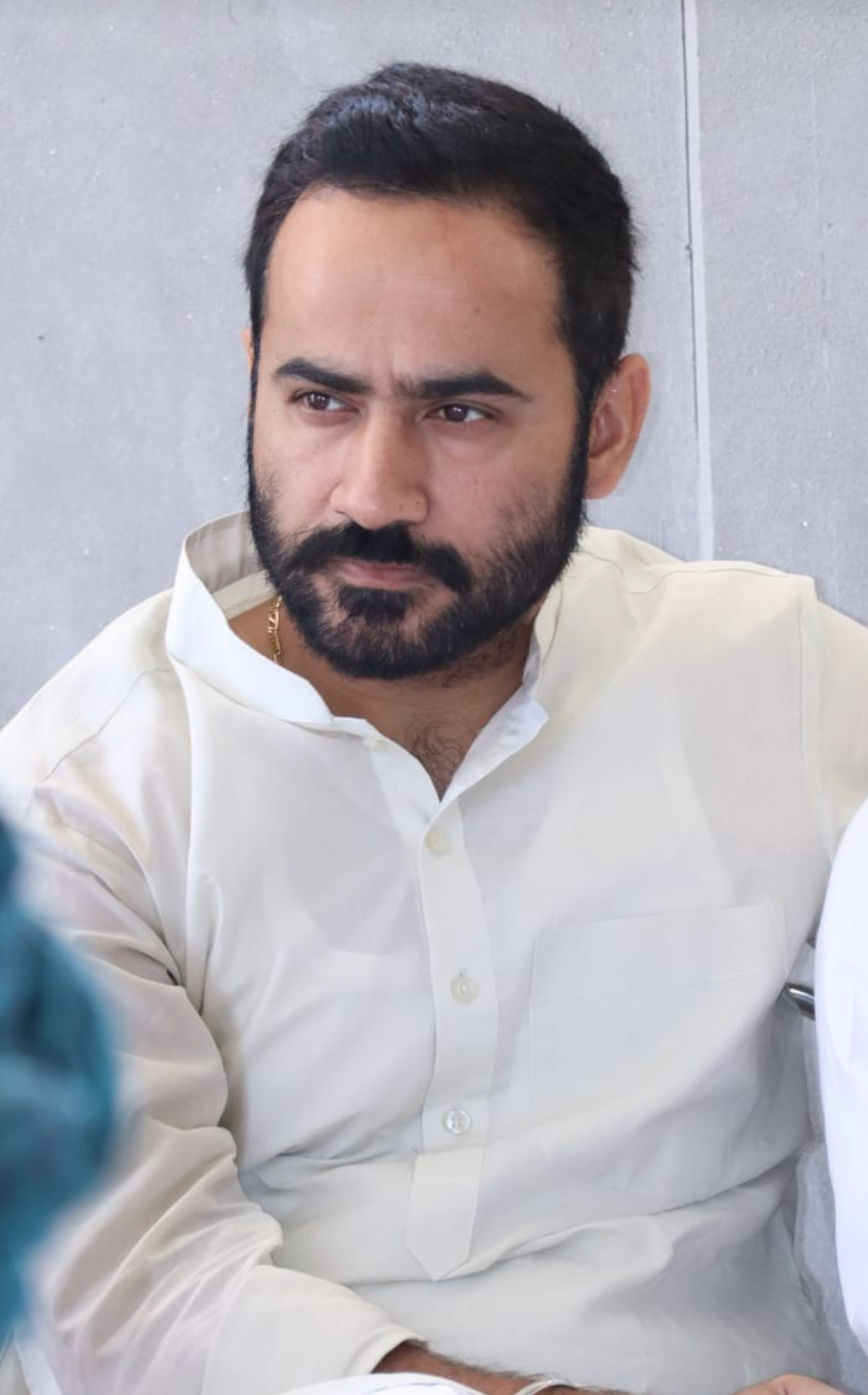
- Incumbent Gurmeet Singh Meet Hayer
- Party: AAP
- Alliance: None
- Elected year: 2024
- Preceded by: Simranjit Singh Mann

Sangrur Lok Sabha constituency is one of the 13 Lok Sabha (parliamentary) constituencies in Punjab state in northern India.

== Assembly segments ==
Presently, Sangrur Lok Sabha constituency comprises the following nine Vidhan Sabha (legislative assembly) segments:

Reserved for SC

Constituency		District	MLA	Party	Leading (in 2024)
Number	Name	District	MLA	Party	Leading (in 2024)
99	Lehra	Sangrur	Barinder Kumar Goyal	AAP	AAP
100	Dirba	Sangrur	Harpal Cheema	AAP	AAP
101	Sunam	Sangrur	Aman Arora	AAP	AAP
102	Bhadaur	Barnala	Labh Singh Ugoke	AAP	AAP
103	Barnala	Barnala	Kuldeep Singh Dhillon	INC	AAP
104	Mehal Kalan	Barnala	Kulwant Singh Pandori	AAP	AAP
105	Malerkotla	Malerkotla	Mohammad Jamil Ur Rehman	AAP	INC
107	Dhuri	Sangrur	Bhagwant Mann	AAP	AAP
108	Sangrur	Sangrur	Narinder Kaur Bharaj	AAP	AAP

== Members of Parliament ==
Most Successful parties from Sangrur Lok Sabha
1. SAD (6 Times) (33.3%)
2. INC(4 Times) (22.2%)
3. AAP (3 Times) (16.7%)
4. SAD (A) (3 Times) (16.7%)
5. CPI (2 Times) (11.1%)

Year	Member	Party
1952	Sardar Ranjit Singh	Indian National Congress
1957	Did not exist	
1962	Sardar Ranjit Singh	Communist Party of India
1967	Nirlep Kaur	Shiromani Akali Dal
1971	Teja Singh Swatantra	Communist Party of India
1977	Surjit Singh Barnala	Shiromani Akali Dal
1980	Gurcharan Singh Nihalsinghwala	Indian National Congress
1984	Balwant Singh Ramoowalia	Shiromani Akali Dal
1989	Rajdev Singh	Shiromani Akali Dal (Amritsar)
1991	Gurcharan Singh Dadhahoor	Indian National Congress
1996	Surjit Singh Barnala	Shiromani Akali Dal
1998	Surjit Singh Barnala	Shiromani Akali Dal
1999	Simranjit Singh Mann	Shiromani Akali Dal (Amritsar)
2004	Sukhdev Singh Dhindsa	Shiromani Akali Dal
2009	Vijay Inder Singla	Indian National Congress
2014	Bhagwant Mann	Aam Aadmi Party
2019	Bhagwant Mann	Aam Aadmi Party
2022^	Simranjit Singh Mann	Shiromani Akali Dal (Amritsar)
2024	Gurmeet Singh Meet Hayer	Aam Aadmi Party

^By-Poll

== Election results ==
=== 2024 ===
General Election 2024: Sangrur
Party	Candidate	Votes	%	±%
AAP	Gurmeet Singh Meet Hayer	364,085	36.06	▲1.27
INC	Sukhpal Singh Khaira	191,525	18.97	▲7.76
SAD(A)	Simranjit Singh Mann	187,246	18.55	▼17.06
BJP	Arvind Khanna	128,253	12.70	▲3.37
SAD	Iqbal Singh Jhundan	62,488	6.19	▼0.06
NOTA	None of the Above	3,820	0.38	▲0.03
Majority		172,560	▲17.09	▲16.21
Turnout		1,009,665		
Registered electors		1,556,601		
AAP gain from SAD(A)		Swing	▲1.27	

=== 2022 by-election ===
Incumbent Sangrur Lok Sabha constituency MP Bhagwant Mann had contested in the Punjab Assembly election and won. AAP won a large majority of 92 out of total 117 seats. Mann was designated as the Chief Minister of Punjab. Before taking the oath as CM of Punjab, Bhagwant Mann resigned from his post of MP Sangrur. By-election to Sangrur Lok Sabha constituency was held on 23 June 2022. Simranjit Singh Mann was declared the winner 26 June 2022.

2022 By-election: Sangrur
Party	Candidate	Votes	%	±%
SAD(A)	Simranjit Singh Mann	253,154	35.61	▲31.24
AAP	Gurmail Singh	247,332	34.79	▼2.61
INC	Dalvir Singh Goldy	79,668	11.21	▼16.22
BJP	Kewal Singh Dhillon	66,298	9.33	New
SAD	Bibi Kamaldeep Kaur Rajoana	44,428	6.25	▼17.58
NOTA	None of the Above	2471	0.35	
Majority		6,245	0.88	
Turnout		7,10,919	45.3%	▼27.1
Registered electors		15,69,240		
SAD(A) gain from AAP		Swing	▲16.92	

=== 2019 ===
General Election 2019: Sangrur
Party	Candidate	Votes	%	±%
AAP	Bhagwant Mann	413,561	37.40	▼11.07
INC	Kewal Singh Dhillon	303,350	27.43	▲9.93
SAD	Parminder Singh Dhindsa	263,498	23.83	▼5.40
SAD(A)	Simranjit Singh Mann	48,365	4.37	
LIP	Jasraj Singh Longia	20,087	1.82	
NOTA	None of the Above	6,490	0.59	▲0.39
Majority		110,211	9.97	▼10.46
Turnout		1,107,256	72.40	
AAP hold		Swing	▼10.5	

=== 2014 ===
General Election 2014: Sangrur
Party	Candidate	Votes	%	±%
AAP	Bhagwant Mann	533,237	48.47	▲48.47
SAD	Sukhdev Singh Dhindsa	321,516	29.23	▼4.90
INC	Vijay Inder Singla	181,410	17.50	▼21.02
BSP	Madan Bhatti	8,408	0.76	
CPI	Sukhdev Ram Sharma	6,934	0.63	
Majority		211,721	19.24	▲14.85
Turnout		1,100,056	77.21	
AAP gain from INC		Swing	▲34.75	

=== 2009 ===
General Election 2009: Sangrur
Party	Candidate	Votes	%	±%
INC	Vijay Inder Singla	358,670	38.52	
SAD	Sukhdev Singh Dhindsa	3,17,798	34.13	
LBP	Balwant Singh Ramoowalia	115,012	12.35	
BSP	Mohmad. Jamil-Ur-Rehman	69,943	7.51	
SAD(A)	Simranjit Singh Mann	33,714	3.62	
Majority		40,872	4.39	
Turnout		931,200	74.41	
INC gain from SAD		Swing	-14.06	

=== 2004 ===
General Election 2004: Sangrur
Party	Candidate	Votes	%	±%
SAD	Sukhdev Singh Dhindsa	286,828	34.2	▲4.50
INC	Arvind Khanna	259,551	31.0	N/A
SAD(A)	Simranjit Singh Mann	216,898	25.9	▼
BSP	Mangat Rai Bansal	38,215	4.6	N/A
Independent	Sukhdev Singh Bari	14,289	1.7	N/A
Independent	Mohamad Shamshad	8,872	1.1	N/A
Majority				
Turnout				=
SAD gain from SAD(A)		Swing		

=== 1999 ===
General Election 1999: Sangrur
Party	Candidate	Votes	%	±%
SAD(A)	Simranjit Singh Mann	298,846	41.7	▲12.90
SAD	Surjit Singh Barnala	212,529	29.7	▲0.90
CPI(M)	Ajit Singh	190,824	26.6	▲21.90
Independent	Nirmal singh	5,738	0.80	N/A
Majority		86,317	12.1	▲1.10
Turnout		7,16,182	62.5	▼3.90
SAD(A) gain from SAD		Swing		

=== 1998 ===
General Election 1998: Sangrur
Party	Candidate	Votes	%	±%
SAD	Surjit Singh Barnala	297,393	39.8	▼8.40
SAD(A)	Simranjit Singh Mann	215,228	28.8	▲7.40
INC	Gurcharan Singh Dadhaboor	187,711	25.1	▲6.10
CPI(M)	Chand Singh Chopra	35,380	4.7	▼16.00
Majority		82,165	11.0	▲1.00
Turnout		7,47,116	66.4	▼5.20
SAD hold				

=== 1996 ===
General Election 1996: Sangrur
Party	Candidate	Votes	%	±%
SAD	Surjit Singh Barnala	238,131	31.4	
SAD(A)	Simranjit Singh Mann	162,479	21.4	
CPI(M)	Chand Singh Chopra	156,770	20.7	
INC	Gurcharan Singh Dadhaboor	140,877	18.6	
Majority		75,652	10.0	
Turnout		757,827	71.6	
SAD gain from INC		Swing		

=== 1992 ===
General Election 1992: Sangrur
Party	Candidate	Votes	%	±%
INC	Gurcharan Singh Dadahoor	43,908	44.33	
CPI(M)	Chand Singh Chopra	38,610	38.98	
BSP	Atma Singh	13,813	13.94	
Independent	Karamjit Singh	1,415	1.43	
Independent	Hardial Singh	1,312	1.32	
Majority		5,298	5.35	
Turnout		99,058	10.35	
INC gain from CPI(M)		Swing		

== See also ==
- Sangrur district Dhuri of Sangrur District was part of Ropar parliament constituency.
- List of constituencies of the Lok Sabha
