= Sunam Assembly constituency =

Legislative Assembly constituency in Punjab State, India

Coordinates: 30.13°N 75.81°E

Sunam
- Constituency No. 101 for the Punjab Legislative Assembly

Constituency details
- Country: India
- State: Punjab
- District: Sangrur
- Lok Sabha constituency: Sangrur
- Established: 1951
- Total electors: 196,952
- Reservation: None

Member of Legislative Assembly
- 16th Punjab Legislative Assembly
- Incumbent Aman Arora
- Party: Aam Aadmi Party
- Elected year: 2022

Sunam Assembly constituency (Sl. No.: 101) is a Punjab Legislative Assembly constituency in Sangrur district, Punjab state, India.

== Members of the Legislative Assembly ==
Most successful parties from Sunam Vidhan Sabha
1. SAD (8 Times) (44.4%)
2. INC (5 Times) (27.8%)
3. AAP (2 Times) (11.1%)
4. AD – SFS (1 Time) (5.56%)
5. IND (1 Time) (5.56%)
6. LCPHU (1 Time) (5.56%)

Year	Member	Party
As part of PEPSU Legislative Assembly (1951–56)
1952	Bachan Singh bakhshiwala	Lal Communist Party Hind Union
1954	Maheshinder Singh	Indian National Congress
As part of Punjab Legislative Assembly (1956–Present)
1957	Pritam Singh	Indian National Congress
1957	Maheshinder Singh	Independent
1962	Brish Bhan	Indian National Congress
1967	Gurbachan Singh	Akali Dal – Sant Fateh Singh Group
1969	Gurbachan Singh	Shiromani Akali Dal
1972	Gurbachan Singh	Shiromani Akali Dal
1977	Sukhdev Singh	Shiromani Akali Dal
1980	Gurbachan Singh	Shiromani Akali Dal
1985	Sukhdev Singh	Shiromani Akali Dal
1992	Bhagwan Dass Arora	Indian National Congress
1997	Bhagwan Dass Arora	Indian National Congress
2002	Parminder Singh Dhindsa	Shiromani Akali Dal
2007	Parminder Singh Dhindsa	Shiromani Akali Dal
2012	Parminder Singh Dhindsa	Shiromani Akali Dal
2017	Aman Arora	Aam Aadmi Party
2022	Aman Arora	Aam Aadmi Party

== Election results ==
=== 2027 ===
Punjab Assembly election, 2027: Sunam
Party	Candidate	Votes	%	±%
AAP				
AD (WPD)				New entry
INC				
BSP				
SAD				
BJP				New entry
NOTA	None of the above			
Majority				
Turnout				

=== 2022 ===
2022 Punjab Legislative Assembly election: Sunam
Party	Candidate	Votes	%	±%
AAP	Aman Arora	94,794	61.28	
INC	Jaswinder Singh Dhiman	19,517	12.7	
SAD	Baldev Singh Maan	12,714	8.3	
SAD(S)	Sanmukh Singh Mokha	11,351	7.4	
SAD(A)	Amritpal Singh Sidhu	10,721	7.0	
NOTA	None of the above	1,505	0.8	
Majority		75,277	48.66	
Turnout		154,684	78.5	
Registered electors		196,949		

=== 2017 ===
2017 Punjab Legislative Assembly election: Sunam
Party	Candidate	Votes	%	±%
AAP	Aman Arora	72,815	47.38	
SAD	Gobind Singh Longowal	42,508	27.66	
INC	Daman Thind Bajwa	30,518	19.86	
NOTA	None of the Above	1,718	0.90	
Majority		30,307	19.7	
Turnout		153,688	83.9	
Registered electors		185,303		

== See also ==
- List of constituencies of the Punjab Legislative Assembly
- Sangrur district
