= Raghbir Singh (politician) =

Indian politician (1895–1955)

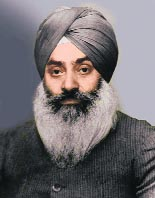

Chief Minister of the Patiala and East Punjab States Union
- In office 8 March 1954 – 7 January 1955
- Preceded by: President's rule
- Succeeded by: Brish Bhan
- Constituency: Patiala Sadar

Premier of PEPSU
- In office 23 May 1951 – 21 April 1952
- Preceded by: Gian Singh Rarewala
- Succeeded by: Gian Singh Rarewala (as Chief Minister)

Personal details
- Born: 1895 Lahore, Punjab Province, British India
- Died: 7 January 1955 (aged 59–60)
- Party: Indian National Congress
- Children: Amarjit Kaur

Raghbir Singh (1895 – 7 January 1955) was an Indian politician and independence activist who served as the 2nd Chief Minister of the former state of the Patiala and East Punjab States Union (PESPU).

Raghbir Singh was born in a village of Lahore in 1895. His lineage included Sardar Sahib Singh and Sardar Lakkha Singh, who were responsible for the early upbringing and education in the use of arms of Maharaja Ranjit Singh of the Sikh Empire.

Singh was introduced into the services of Patiala State by Maharaja Bhupinder Singh and in 1926, he become the Inspector General of Police. Singh played a pivotal role in bringing about a compromise between Patiala Sate and the Akali movement during the uprising of 1942, and he later founded the Lok Sewak Sabha political party. Lok Sewak Sabha later merged into the Indian National Congress and he eventually became the home minister of PEPSU state.

He was appointed as the 2nd Premier of PEPSU after the resignation of Gian Singh Rarewala as Premier; however, in the 1952 assembly election, the Congress failed to get a majority and Rarewala became the first Chief Minister of PEPSU. After a brief period of President's rule in the state, in the 1954 assembly election, the Congress gained a majority and Singh became the 2nd Chief Minister of State and held the office until his death on 7 January 1955. His daughter, Amarjit Kaur, was a Member of Parliament in the Rajya Sabha and married Kunwar Devinder Singh, son of Bhupinder Singh.
