= Kandaghat Assembly constituency =

Former constituency of the Himachal Pradesh legislative assembly in India

Coordinates: 30.97°N 77.10°E

Kandaghat
- Former constituency for the Himachal Pradesh Legislative Assembly

Constituency details
- Country: India
- Region: North India
- State: Himachal Pradesh
- Established: 1952
- Abolished: 1977

Kandaghat Assembly constituency was an assembly constituency in the Indian state of Himachal Pradesh.

It was one of the assembly constituencies in the Patiala and East Punjab States Union during its establishment in 1952.

== Members of the Legislative Assembly ==
=== Patiala and East Punjab States Union ===
Year	Con. No.	Res.	Member	Political party
1952 (Note: It was double member constituency in 1952 and 1954 elections.)	28	None	Ranjit Singh	Independent
1952	28	None	Lekh Ram	Independent
1954	2	None	Roshan Lal	Indian National Congress
1954	2	None	Gian Chand	Indian National Congress

=== Himachal Pradesh ===
Year	Con. No.	Res.	Member	Political party
1967	13	SC	N. Ram	Indian National Congress
1972	14	SC	Bhagwan Singh	Indian National Congress

== Election results ==
=== 1972 ===
1972 Himachal Pradesh Legislative Assembly election: Kandaghat
Party	Candidate	Votes	%	±%
INC	Bhagwan Singh	5,963	61.86	
CPI	Anokhi Ram Betab	1,930	20.02	
Independent	Tulsi Ram	655	6.80	
Independent	Shonk Ram	585	6.07	
INC(O)	Keshav Ram	238	2.47	
Independent	Nathu Ram	188	1.95	
Independent	Charan Singh	80	0.83	
Margin of victory		4,033	41.84	
Total valid votes		9,639		
Rejected ballots		311	3.13	
Turnout		9,950	39.74	
Registered electors		25,038		
INC hold		Swing		

=== 1967 ===
1967 Himachal Pradesh Legislative Assembly election: Kandaghat
Party	Candidate	Votes	%	±%
INC	N. Ram	4,699	51.76	
CPI	A. Ram	2,605	28.70	
Independent	R. Singh	1,215	13.38	
Independent	N. Ram	157	1.73	
PSP	R. Dass	148	1.63	
Independent	B. Singh	142	1.56	
RPI	Shanhroo	112	1.23	
Margin of victory		2,094	23.07	
Total valid votes		9,078		
Rejected ballots		399	4.21	
Turnout		9,477	39.90	
Registered electors		23,754		
INC gain from		Swing		

=== 1954 ===
1954 Patiala and East Punjab States Union Legislative Assembly election: Kandaghat
Party	Candidate	Votes	%	±%
INC	Gian Chand	12,706	32.55	
INC	Roshan Lal	10,950	28.05	
Independent	Ranjit Singh	6,979	17.88	
Independent	Chhauju Ram	6,967	17.85	
Independent	Bejay Kumar	1,429	3.66	
Margin of victory				
Total valid votes		39,031	79.20	
Rejected ballots		0		
Turnout		39,031		
Registered electors		49,283		
INC gain from Independent		Swing		

=== 1952 ===
1952 Patiala and East Punjab States Union Legislative Assembly election: Kandaghat
Party	Candidate	Votes	%	±%
Independent	Ranjit Sing	0	0.00	
Independent	Lekh Ram	9,960	45.79	
ABJS	Vijay Kumar	6,583	30.27	
RSP	Muni Lal	4,019	18.48	
Independent	Sada Nand	1,188	5.46	
Margin of victory				
Total valid votes		21,750		
Rejected ballots		0		
Turnout		21,750	36.01	
Registered electors		60,402		
Independent win (new seat)				
