= Amarjit Kaur =

Indian politician

Member of Parliament, Rajya Sabha
- In office 1976–1988
- Constituency: Punjab

Personal details
- Born: 13 September 1939
- Party: Indian National Congress
- Spouse: Kanwar Divindra Singh
- Parent: Raghbir Singh (father)

Amarjit Kaur is an Indian politician. She was a Member of Parliament and represented Punjab in the Rajya Sabha, the upper house of India's Parliament as a member of the Indian National Congress political party. Her father was Ragbhir Singh, who served as Chief Minister of the former state of Patiala and East Punjab States Union. Kaur's husband was Kanwar Devinder Singh, the son of Maharaja Bhupinder Singh of Patiala. Earlier in her career, Kaur had been elected to municipal councils, was a nominated member of the Patiala Improvement Trust and had twice served as the chairperson of the Central Social Welfare Board, an autonomous organization under the Ministry of Women and Child Development.
