= Malerkotla Assembly constituency =

Legislative Assembly constituency in Punjab State, India

Coordinates: 30.53°N 75.88°E

Malerkotla
- Constituency No. 105 for the Punjab Legislative Assembly

Constituency details
- Country: India
- State: Punjab
- District: Malerkotla
- Lok Sabha constituency: Sangrur
- Total electors: 160,388
- Reservation: None

Member of Legislative Assembly
- 16th Punjab Legislative Assembly
- Incumbent Mohammad Jamil Ur Rehman
- Party: Aam Aadmi Party
- Elected year: 2022

Malerkotla is a Punjab Legislative Assembly constituency in Sangrur district, Punjab state, India.

== Members of the Legislative Assembly ==
Most successful parties from Malerkotla Vidhan Sabha
1. INC (9 Times) (52.9%)
2. SAD (5 Times) (29.4%)
3. AAP (1 Time) (5.88%)
4. INC (I) (1 Time) (5.88%)
5. IND (1 Time) (5.88%)

Year	Member	Party
As part of PEPSU Legislative Assembly (1951–56)
1952	Iftikharali Khan	Independent
1954	Mohd. Iftkhar Ali Khan	Indian National Congress
As part of Punjab Legislative Assembly (1956–Present)
1957	Chanda Singh	Indian National Congress
1962	Yusuf Zaman Begum	Indian National Congress
1967	H. H. N. I. A. Khan	Indian National Congress
1969	Nawab Iftikhar Ali Khan	Shiromani Akali Dal
1972	Sajida Begum	Indian National Congress
1977	Anwar Ahmad Khan	Shiromani Akali Dal
1980	Sajida Begum	Indian National Congress (Indira)
1985	Nusrat Ali Khan	Shiromani Akali Dal
1992	Abdul Ghaffar	Indian National Congress
1997	Nusrat Ali Khan	Shiromani Akali Dal
2002	Razia Sultana	Indian National Congress
2007	Razia Sultana	Indian National Congress
2012	F. Nesara Khatoon	Shiromani Akali Dal
2017	Razia Sultana	Indian National Congress
2022	Mohammad Jamil Ur Rehman	Aam Aadmi Party

== Election results ==
=== 2027 ===
Punjab Assembly election, 2027: Malerkotla
Party	Candidate	Votes	%	±%
AAP				
AD (WPD)				New entry
INC				
BSP				
SAD				
BJP				New entry
NOTA	None of the above			
Majority				
Turnout				

=== 2022 ===
Punjab Assembly election, 2022: Malerkotla
Party	Candidate	Votes	%	±%
AAP	Mohammad Jamil Ur Rehman	65,948	52.32	
INC	Razia Sultana	44,262	35.12	
SAD	Nusrat Ali Khan	8,421	6.68	
PLC	F. Nesara Khatton	3,766	2.99	
NOTA	None of the above	687	0.55	
Majority		21,686	17.2	
Turnout		126,042	78.59	
Registered electors		1,60,388		
AAP gain from INC		Swing		

=== 2017 ===
Punjab Assembly election, 2017: Malerkotla
Party	Candidate	Votes	%	±%
INC	Razia Sultana	58,982	46.7	
SAD	Mohammad Owais	46,280	36.7	
AAP	Mohamad Arshad	17,635	14.0	
NOTA	None of the above	603	0.4	
Majority		12,702	10.1	
Turnout		125,652	84.6	
Registered electors		149,304		

== See also ==
- List of constituencies of the Punjab Legislative Assembly
- Sangrur district
