= Punjab Assembly Committee on Subordinate Legislation =

Indian Legislative committee

Committee on Subordinate Legislation
Committee of the House
- 16th Punjab Assembly
- State: Punjab

Leadership
- Chaiperson: Barinder Kumar Goyal
- Chairperson party: Aam Aadmi Party
- Appointer: Punjab Assembly speaker

Structure
- Seats: 13
- Political Parties: AAP (10); INC (2); IND (1)
- Election criteria: The members are elected every year from amongst its members of house according to the principle of proportional representation.
- Tenure: 1 Year

Jurisdiction
- Purpose: Legislative oversight of the Subordinate Legislation

Rules & Procedure
- Applicable rules: Article 208 of the Constitution of India section 32 of the States Reorganisation Act, 1956; Rules 232(1) and 2(b) of Rules of Procedure and Conduct of Business in Punjab Legislative Assembly

Punjab Assembly Committee on Subordinate Legislation of Punjab Legislative Assembly is constituted annually for a one year period from among the members of the Assembly. This Committee consists of thirteen members.

== Appointment ==
The speaker appoints the committee and its members every year for a one year term according to the powers conferred by Article 208 of the Constitution of India read with section 32 of the States Reorganisation Act, 1956 (37 of 1956), and in pursuance of Rules 232(1) and 2(b) of the Rules of Procedure and Conduct of Business in the Punjab Legislative Assembly.

== Members ==
For the one year period starting May 2022, the Committee on Subordinate Legislation of 16th Punjab Assembly had following members:

Committee on Subordinate Legislation (2022–23)
Sr. No.	Name	Post	Party
1	Barinder Kumar Goyal Vakeel	Chairperson	AAP
2	Ajit Pal Singh Kohli	Member	AAP
3	Avtar Singh Junior	Member	INC
4	Gurdev Singh Dev Mann	Member	AAP
5	Jasbir Singh Sandhu	Member	AAP
6	Karambir Singh Ghuman	Member	AAP
7	Kulwant Singh	Member	AAP
8	Lakhbir Singh Rai	Member	AAP
9	Raman Arora	Member	AAP
10	Ranbir Bhullar	Member	AAP
11	Ravjot Singh	Member	AAP
12	Vikramjit Singh Chaudhary	Member	INC
13	Advocate General, Punjab	Member	N/A

== Chairpersons ==
Tenure	Terms	Name	Political party
2021-22	1	Tarsem Singh D.C.	Indian National Congress
2022-23	1	Barinder Kumar Goyal Vakeel	Aam Aadmi Party

== Previous members ==
For the one year periods in past the Committee on Subordinate Legislation of 15th Punjab Assembly had following members:

=== 2021–2022 ===
Committee on Subordinate Legislation (2021–22)
Sr. No.	Name	Post	Party
1	Tarsem Singh D.C.	Chairperson	INC
2	Amit Vij	Member	INC
3	Arun Narang	Member	INC
4	Balwinder Singh Dhaliwal	Member	INC
5	Balwinder Singh	Member	INC
6	Budh Ram	Member	INC
7	Joginder Pal	Member	INC
8	Kanwarjit Singh	Member	INC
9	Kultar Singh Sandhwan	Member	AAP
10	Pawan Kumar Tinu	Member	INC
11	Raj Kumar	Member	INC
12	Surinder Kumar Dawar	Member	INC
13	Advocate General, Punjab	Member	N/A

=== 2020–2021 ===
Committee on Subordinate Legislation (2020–21)
Sr. No.	Name	Post	Party
1	Tarsem Singh D.C.	Chairperson	INC
2	Amit Vij	Member	INC
3	Avtar Singh Junior	Member	INC
4	Balwinder Singh Bains	Member	INC
5	Harminder Singh Gill	Member	INC
6	Harvinder Singh Phoolka	Member	AAP
7	Manjit Singh	Member	INC
8	N.K.Sharma	Member	INC
9	Parminder Singh Dhindsa	Member	INC
10	Rakesh Pandey	Member	INC
11	Sangat Singh Gilzian	Member	INC
12	Sukhjeet Singh	Member	INC
13	Advocate General, Punjab	Member	N/A

=== 2018–2019 ===
Committee on Subordinate Legislation (2018–19)
Sr. No.	Name	Post	Party
1	Raj Kumar Verka	Chairperson	INC
2	Baljinder Kaur	Member	AAP
3	Dalvir Singh Goldy	Member	INC
4	Darshan Singh Brar	Member	INC
5.	Harjot Kamal Singh	Member	INC
6	Harinder Pal Singh Chandumajra	Member	INC
7	Rajinder Singh	Member	INC
8	Rajinder Beri	Member	INC
9	Ramanjeet Singh Sikki	Member	INC
10	Sarvjit Kaur Manuke	Member	AAP
11.	Sharanjit Singh Dhillon	Member	INC
12	Simarjeet Singh Bains	Member	INC
13	Advocate General, Punjab	Member	N/A

=== 2017–2018 ===
Committee on Subordinate Legislation (2017–18)
Sr. No.	Name	Post	Party
1	Rakesh Pandey	Chairperson	INC
2	Amrik Singh Dhillon	Member	INC
3	Avtar Singh Junior	Member	INC
4	Baljinder Kaur	Member	AAP
5.	Balwinder Singh	Member	INC
6	Fatehjang Singh Bajwa	Member	INC
7	Joginder Pal	Member	INC
8	Kulwant Singh Pandori	Member	AAP
9	Parminder Singh Dhindsa	Member	INC
10	Rajinder Singh	Member	INC
11	Sanjeev Talwar	Member	INC
12.	Sharanjit Singh Dhillon	Member	INC
13	Advocate General, Punjab	Member	N/A
