= Nabha Assembly constituency =

Legislative Assembly constituency in Punjab State, India

Coordinates: 30.38°N 76.15°E

Nabha
- Constituency No. 109 for the Punjab Legislative Assembly

Constituency details
- Country: India
- State: Punjab
- District: Patiala
- Lok Sabha constituency: Patiala
- Total electors: 184,623
- Reservation: SC

Member of Legislative Assembly
- 16th Punjab Legislative Assembly
- Incumbent Gurdev Singh Dev Mann
- Party: Aam Aadmi Party
- Elected year: 2022

Nabha is one of the 117 Legislative Assembly constituencies of Punjab state in India. It is part of Patiala district and is reserved for candidates belonging to the Scheduled Castes.

== Members of the Legislative Assembly ==
Most successful parties from Nabha Vidhan Sabha
1. INC (9 Times) (52.9%)
2. IND (3 Times) (17.6%)
3. SAD (3 Times) (17.6%)
4. AAP (1 Time) (5.88%)
5. INC (I) (1 Time) (5.88%)

Year	Member	Party
As part of PEPSU Legislative Assembly (1951–56)
1952	Gurbhajnik Singh	Shiromani Akali Dal
1954	Shivdev Singh	Indian National Congress
As part of Punjab Legislative Assembly (1956–Present)
1957	Balwant Singh	Indian National Congress
1962	Gurdarshan Singh	Indian National Congress
1967	Narinder Singh	Independent
1969	Narinder Singh	Independent
1972	Gurdarshan Singh	Indian National Congress
1977	Gurdarshan Singh	Indian National Congress
1980	Gurdarshan Singh	Indian National Congress (Indira)
1985	Narinder Singh	Shiromani Akali Dal
1992	Ramesh Kumar	Independent
1997	Narinder Singh	Shiromani Akali Dal
2002	Randeep Singh	Indian National Congress
2007	Randeep Singh	Indian National Congress
2012	Sadhu Singh Dharamsot	Indian National Congress
2017	Sadhu Singh Dharamsot	Indian National Congress
2022	Gurdev Singh Dev Mann	Aam Aadmi Party

== Election results ==
=== 2027 ===
Punjab Assembly election, 2027: Nabha
Party	Candidate	Votes	%	±%
AAP				
AD (WPD)				New entry
INC				
BSP				
SAD				
BJP				
NOTA	None of the above			
Majority				
Turnout				

=== 2022 ===
Punjab Assembly election, 2022: Nabha
Party	Candidate	Votes	%	±%
AAP	Gurdev Singh Dev Mann	82,053	58.0	
SAD	Kabir Dass	29,453	20.80	
INC	Sadhu Singh Dharamsot	18,251	12.78	
BJP	Gurpreet Singh Shahpur	6,444	4.51	
SSP	Barinder Kumar	3,014	2.11	
NOTA	None of the above	1,424	0.8	
Majority		52,600	36.83	
Turnout		142,819	77.1	
Registered electors		185,308		
AAP gain from INC		Swing		

=== 2017 ===
Punjab Assembly election, 2017: Nabha
Party	Candidate	Votes	%	±%
INC	Sadhu Singh Dharamsot	60,861	42.7	
AAP	Gurdev Singh Dev Mann	41,866	29.4	
SAD	Kabir Dass	32,482	22.8	
NOTA	None of the above	1,280	0.7	
Majority		18,995	13.5	
Turnout		141,152	81.1	
Registered electors		175,673		
INC hold				

== See also ==
- List of constituencies of the Punjab Legislative Assembly
- Patiala district
