= Nirlep Kaur =

Indian politician (1927–1987)

Nirlep Kaur (1927–1987) was a politician from Punjab, India. She represented Sangrur in the 4th Lok Sabha.

== Early life ==
Born on 11 August 1927 in Patiala, in a royal family, Nirlep Kaur was the daughter of Sardar Gian Singh Rarewala, who later became the first Chief Minister of Patiala and East Punjab States Union. Kaur attended Sacred Heart Convent School, Lahore.

== Career ==
Kaur contested the 1967 Indian general election for the 4th Lok Sabha on the ticket of Akali Dal – Sant Fateh Singh. She defeated the INC candidate by a margin of 98,212 votes. She and Rajmata Mohinder Kaur of Patiala were the first two women from reorganised Punjab to enter the Indian parliament. She had previously been a secretary for Swatantra Party and the president of Mata Sahib Kaur Vidyalaya in Patiala.

Kaur was the first woman who stood in the election for the president of Shiromani Gurdwara Prabandhak Committee, though she lost. In the 1980 Punjab Legislative Assembly election, she contested from Payal but lost to Beant Singh of the Indian National Congress by a difference of 2,936 votes.

== Personal life ==
On 14 March 1942, she married Sardar Rajdev Singh Akoi, from whom she has three children. Rajdev Singh Akoi was also an owner of The Imperial, a luxury hotel in New Delhi. Her house had the first swimming pool in the city of Chandigarh.
