= Pakistan Communist Party =

- Founder: Teja Singh Swatantar
- Founded: 1947
- Dissolved: 1947
- Ideology: Communism; Marxism-Leninism

The Pakistan Communist Party was a short-lived splinter group of the Communist Party of India, existing for three weeks in the summer of 1947. The party was founded by Teja Singh Swatantar and Fazal Elahi Qurban. The party had a provisional politburo consisting of Swatantar, Qurban and Dutt.

On one hand, the PCP split represented dissatisfaction with the shift of the party line on the national question. In 1942 CPI had, in response to the demand for Pakistan, formulated a position which supported the notion of self-determination of nationalities. By 1947 this line had been reverted and the Muslim demand for Pakistan was now branded as a reactionary movement by CPI. Swatantar and Qurban argued towards the CPI leadership to retain support for self-determination of nationalities. The PCP was built on this position. The founders of PCP were also opposed to the new CPI line on Kashmir.

On the other hand, the launch of PCP was not only about disagreements on the issue of Pakistan and Muslim national self-determination. It also represented a revolt of the old Kirti-Ghadar revolutionaries against the CPI party hierarchy. On 22 June two central CPI leaders (Ajoy Ghosh and B. T. Ranadive) had arrived in Punjab, supposedly to depose Swatantar as Provincial Party Secretary. A few weeks later, on 16 July 1947 the foundation of PCP was declared in a letter sent out to 40 communist parties around the world. The PCP split severely affected the CPI in Punjab at the time.

The CPI leadership reacted strongly to the formation of PCP. On 18 July 1947 a letter was sent to all Party District Committees in Punjab, instructing them to denounce the PCP. Ghosh himself visited the western parts of Punjab, trying to dissuade local party branches from siding with PCP. Nevertheless, it was understood that more than half of the 2,293 CPI members in Punjab were supportive of the PCP. The PCP was mainly based in western Punjab. PCP appealed to CPI branches in the North-West Frontier Province, Sindh and Baluchistan to join the new party. In Sindh the group around Qadir Baksh Nizamani supported the PCP.

Nevertheless, by the time PCP was formed Punjab was engulfed by communal violence in the days before the Partition of India. As riots raged, most Sikh and Hindu communist cadres in the western districts of Punjab left for India. This exodus left the communist movement on the verge of extinction in the lands that would soon form West Pakistan. PCP, whose leadership was predominantly Sikh, quickly became defunct.

== See also ==
- Lal Communist Party Hind Union
