= 1954 Patiala and East Punjab States Union Legislative Assembly election =

1952 Patiala and East Punjab States Union Legislative Assembly election
- 18 February 1954

All 60 seats in the Patiala and East Punjab States Union Legislative Assembly 31 seats needed for a majority
- Registered: 1,896,378
- Turnout: 60.83%
	Majority party	Minority party
	INC
Party	INC	Shiromani Akali Dal (Mann Group)
Seats before	26	New
Seats won	37	10
Seat change	▲11	New
Popular vote	43.27%	20.76%
CM before election
President's rule
Elected CM
Raghbir Singh
INC

Elections to the Legislative Assembly of the Indian state of Patiala and East Punjab States Union were held on 18 February 1954. 279 candidates competed for the 48 constituencies in the Assembly. There were twelve two-member constituencies and 36 single-member constituencies. Out of these, 2 single member constituencies were reserved for SC.

== Results ==
Summary of results of the 1954 Patiala & East Punjab States Union Legislative Assembly election
Political party	Flag	Seats Contested	Won	Net change in seats	% of Seats	Votes	Vote %	Change in vote %
Indian National Congress		60	37	▲9	61.67	6,96,979	43.27	▲14.61
Shiromani Akali Dal (Mann Group)		33	10	New	16.67	3,34,423	20.76	New
Shiromani Akali Dal (Raman Group)		22	2	New	3.33	1,19,301	7.41	New
Communist Party of India		10	4	▲2	6.67	97,690	6.06	▲1.29
Independent		139	7	▼1	11.67	3,42,787	21.28	N/A
		Total seats	60 ( 0)	Voters	26,48,175	Turnout	16,10,909 (60.83%)	

== Elected members ==
#	Constituency	Reserved for (SC/None)	Member	Party
1	Nalagarh	None	Surinder Singh	Indian National Congress
2	Kandaghat	None	Roshan Lal	Indian National Congress
2	Kandaghat	None	Gian Chand	Indian National Congress
3	Banur	None	Harchand Singh	Indian National Congress
3	Banur	None	Kirpal Singh	Indian National Congress
4	Rajpura	None	Prem Singh	Indian National Congress
5	Bassi	None	Achhra Singh	Indian National Congress
6	Sirhind	None	Balwant Singh	Indian National Congress
7	Patiala City	None	Manmohan Kaur	Shiromani Akali Dal
8	Patiala Sadar	None	Raghbir Singh	Indian National Congress
9	Samana	None	Pritam Singh	Independent
9	Samana	None	Surinder Nath	Independent
10	Amloh	None	Gian Singh	Independent
10	Amloh	None	Mihan Singh	Independent
11	Bhadson	None	Amrik Singh	Shiromani Akali Dal
12	Nabha	None	Shiv Dev Singh	Indian National Congress
13	Bhawanigarh	None	Jangir Singh	Shiromani Akali Dal
14	Sangrur	None	Devinder Singh	Indian National Congress
15	Dhanaula	None	Hardit Singh	Communist Party of India
16	Sunam	None	Maheshinder Singh	Indian National Congress
17	Lehra	None	Pritam Singh Gujran	Shiromani Akali Dal
17	Lehra	None	Pritam Singh Sahoke	Shiromani Akali Dal
18	Narwana	None	Albel Singh	Independent
18	Narwana	None	Fakiria	Indian National Congress
19	Kalayat	None	Brish Bhan	Indian National Congress
20	Jind	None	Dal Singh	Indian National Congress
21	Safidon	None	Kali Ram	Indian National Congress
22	Julana	None	Ghasi Ram	Independent
23	Dadri	None	Amir Singh	Indian National Congress
23	Dadri	None	Ram Chand	Indian National Congress
24	Badhra	None	Chandrawati	Indian National Congress
25	Mohindergarh	None	Mangal Singh	Indian National Congress
26	Kanina	None	Lal Singh	Indian National Congress
27	Ateli	None	Manohar Sham Alias Sham Manohar	Indian National Congress
28	Narnaul	None	Ramsaran Chand Mital	Indian National Congress
29	Nangal Chaudhri	None	Nihal Singh	Indian National Congress
30	Bholath	None	Harnam Singh	Shiromani Akali Dal
31	Kapurthala	None	Thakur Singh	Indian National Congress
32	Phagwara	None	Hans Raj	Indian National Congress
32	Phagwara	None	Sadhu Ram	Indian National Congress
33	Sultanpur	None	Atma Singh	Shiromani Akali Dal
34	Faridkot	None	Harindar Singh	Independent
35	Kot Kapura	SC	Kanwar Manjitinder Singh	Indian National Congress
36	Jaitu	None	Hira Singh	Indian National Congress
37	Nehianwala Raman	None	Chet Singh	Indian National Congress
37	Nehianwala Raman	None	Kartar Singh Of Faridkot	Shiromani Akali Dal
38	Bhatinda	None	Harcharan Singh	Indian National Congress
39	Maur	None	Shamsher Singh	Indian National Congress
40	Mansa	SC	Jangir Singh	Communist Party of India
41	Sardulgarh	None	Pritam Singh	Shiromani Akali Dal
42	Budhlada	None	Dharam Singh	Communist Party of India
42	Budhlada	None	Narotam Singh	Shiromani Akali Dal
43	Dhuri	None	Lehna Singh	Indian National Congress
43	Dhuri	None	Parduman Singh	Indian National Congress
44	Malerkotla	None	Mohd. Iftkhar Ali Khan	Indian National Congress
45	Ahmedgarh	None	Chanda Singh	Indian National Congress
46	Sherpur	None	Gurbakhshish Singh	Indian National Congress
47	Barnala	None	Kartar Singh	Shiromani Akali Dal
48	Phul	None	Dhanna Singh	Shiromani Akali Dal
48	Phul	None	Arjan Singh	Communist Party of India

== State Reorganization and Merger ==
On 1 November 1956, Patiala and East Punjab States Union was merged into Punjab under States Reorganisation Act, 1956.

== See also ==
- Patiala and East Punjab States Union Legislative Assembly
- 1954 elections in India
- 1952 Patiala and East Punjab States Union Legislative Assembly election
- 1952 Punjab Legislative Assembly election
- 1957 Punjab Legislative Assembly election
