= Baba Bujha Singh =

Indian revolutionary leader (died 1970)

Baba Bujha Singh Ghadarite, Comrade
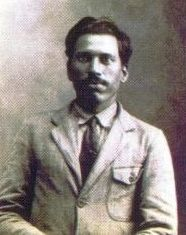
- Baba Bujha Singh in 1930.
- Died: 28 July 1970; Phillaur, Punjab, India
- Cause of death: Killed in fake encounter by Punjab police
- Organization(s): Ghadar Party, Lal Communist Party, Communist Party of India

Baba Bujha Singh (Punjabi: ਬਾਬਾ ਬੂਝਾ ਸਿੰਘ) (died 28 July 1970) was an Indian revolutionary leader. He was an activist of the Ghadar Party and later became a key leader of the Lal Communist Party. Singh later became a symbol of the Naxalite movement in Punjab.

He was one of the leading organizers of the Ghadar Party in Argentina. Baba Bujha Singh returned to India via Moscow.

Baba Bujha Singh would later join the Communist Party of India. Within the Communist Party, he was a prominent figure in the dissident faction that eventually formed the Lal Communist Party in 1948. After the Lal Communist Party was dissolved and largely amalgamated back into the Communist Party of India, Baba Bujha Singh became passive and did not involve himself in party politics.

Baba Bujha Singh deplored the positions adopted by the 20th Congress of the Communist Party of the Soviet Union held in 1956, labelling the congress as 'anti-communist'. He argued that the 1956 congress would eventually lead to the disintegration of the Soviet Union.

He resumed political activism in the wake of the 1967 Naxalbari uprising. Baba Bujha Singh began contacting leftwing dissidents inside the Communist Party of India (Marxist), urging them to rebel against the leadership of the party.

Baba Bujha Singh was arrested on July 28, 1970, and killed in a fake police encounter near Phillaur.

== Legacy ==
After his death, Baba Bujha Singh became an icon of the Naxalite movement in Punjab. There are references to him in Punjabi literature, for example the poet Shiv Kumar Batalvi wrote the poem Budhe Rukh Nu Fansi in his honour. In 2010, Bakhshinder a journalist turned script writer and film maker started the production of a feature film titled Baba Inqlab Singh, on Baba Bujha Singh's life.

The Punjab state headquarters of the Communist Party of India (Marxist-Leninist) Liberation in Mansa is known as Baba Bujha Singh Bhavan.

== Bibliography ==
- Judge, Paramjit S. Insurrection to Agitation: The Naxalite Movement in Punjab. Bombay: Popular Prakashan, 1992
- Sidhu, Ajmer From Ghadar to Naxalbari-Baba Bujha Singh: An Untold Story Online Punjabi Book Store, ISBN 9788179824023
