= Pirmal Singh Dhaula =

Indian politician from Punjab

Member of the Punjab Legislative Assembly
- In office 2017–2021
- Preceded by: Sant Balvir Singh Ghunas
- Succeeded by: Labh Singh Ugoke
- Constituency: Bhadaur

Personal details
- Born: 8 September 1980 (age 45)
- Party: Indian National Congress; Aam Aadmi Party (until 2021)
- Profession: Politician

Pirmal Singh Dhaula (born 8 September 1980) is an Indian politician and a member of Aam Aadmi Party. In the 2017 Punjab Legislative Assembly election, he was elected as the member of the Punjab Legislative Assembly from Bhadaur Assembly constituency. He resigned from his seat in June 2021 and joined the Indian National Congress.

== Constituency ==
Singh Dhaula represents the Bhadaur Assembly constituency. He won the seat as a candidate of the Aam Aadmi Party, beating the incumbent member of the Punjab Legislative Assembly Sant Balvir Singh Ghunas of the Shiromani Akali Dal by 20,784 votes.

State Legislative Assembly
Preceded by Sant Balvir Singh Ghunas (SAD)	Member of the Punjab Legislative Assembly from [[Bhadaur Assembly constituency]] 2017 – 2022	Succeeded by Labh Singh Ugoke
