= Razia Sultana (politician) =

Indian politician

Cabinet Minister, Government of Punjab
- In office 16 March 2017 – 16 March 2022
- Governor: V. P. Singh Badnore; Banwarilal Purohit
- Chief Minister: Charanjit Singh Channi; Amarinder Singh
- Ministry and Departments: Social Security; Women & Child Development; Water Supply & Sanitation; Printing & Stationery

Member of the Punjab Legislative Assembly
- In office March 2017 – 10 March 2022
- Preceded by: Farzana Alam
- Succeeded by: Mohammad Jamil Ur Rehman
- Constituency: Malerkotla
- In office 2002–2007
- Preceded by: Nusrat Ali Khan
- Succeeded by: Farzana Alam
- Constituency: Malerkotla

Personal details
- Born: 3 February 1966 (age 60) Malerkotla, Punjab, India
- Party: Indian National Congress
- Spouse: DGP Muhammad Mustafa

Razia Sultana is an Indian politician and was a cabinet minister in the Government of Punjab. She represented Malerkotla in the Punjab Legislative Assembly of which she was the only Muslim member. She has been elected three times in the Punjab Assembly, in 2002, 2007 and 2017.

== Personal life ==
Sultana was born in a middle class Muslim family at Malerkotla. She is married to IPS officer Muhammad Mustafa who was former DGP of Punjab. The couple have two children.

== Political career ==
In early 2000, Sultana joined active politics in Punjab. She contested and won the elections for Punjab assembly from Malerkotla in 2002 on an Indian National Congress ticket. Sultana was voted back to the state legislature for a second time in 2007. In 2012 Punjab Legislative Assembly election, she lost to F. Nesara Khatoon (Farzana Alam). Sultana regained the seat in 2017 Punjab Legislative Assembly election when she beat her own brother Muhammad Arshad from the Aam Aadmi Party. Sultana is a cabinet minister from the Indian National Congress.

She resigned from her post of cabinet minister in the Punjab Government in Solidarity with Navjot Singh Sidhu on 28 September 2021.

Political offices
Preceded by -	Punjab Cabinet minister for Water Supply & Sanitation; 2017- 2022	Succeeded by Brahm Shankar Jimpa
State Legislative Assembly
Preceded by Farzana Alam (SAD)	Member of the Punjab Legislative Assembly from Malerkotla Assembly constituency 2017 – 2022	Succeeded by Mohammad Jamil Ur Rehman (AAP)
