= Teja Singh Sutantar =

Indian independence activist and politician (1901–1973)

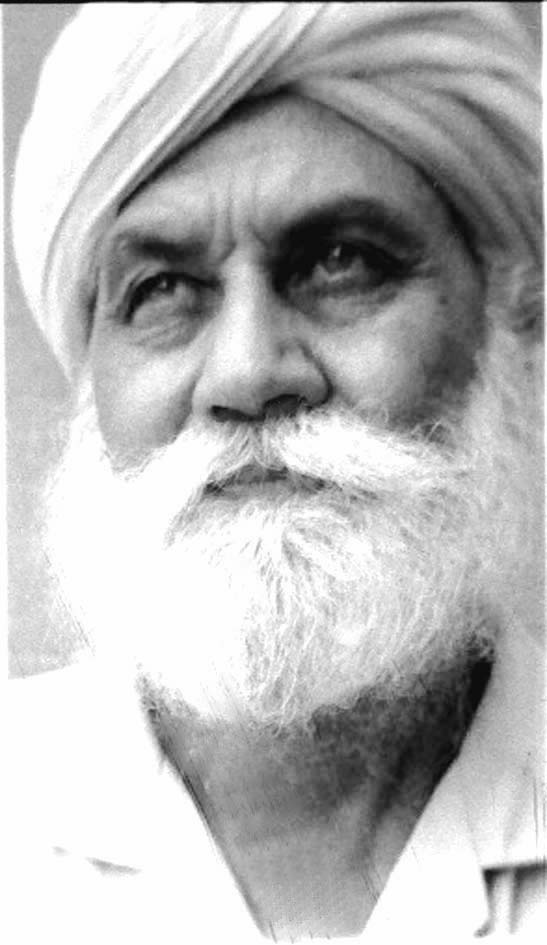
- Teja Singh Sutantar
- Born: Samund Singh; 16 July 1901; Aluna, Punjab Province, British India
- Died: 12 April 1973 (aged 71)
- Occupations: freedom fighter; politician
- Political party: Communist Party of India

Teja Singh Sutantar (16 July 1901 − 12 April 1973), also by his sobriquet Swatantar (lit. 'Free'), was a national revolutionary of India who fought for the independence of India from the British Raj and for the liberation of Punjab peasantry from the clutches of feudal lords. He was a member of the 5th Lok Sabha from Sangrur constituency as a CPI candidate. He also was Member of Punjab Legislative Assembly from 1937 to 1945 and member of Punjab Legislative Council from 1964 to 1969.

He became actively involved in the revolutionary activities during the 1920s when the Ghadar Party was preparing for the second attempt for the overthrow of British government. Sutantar was sent to Turkey in 1924 where he joined the Turkish military academy to attain military knowledge. In and out of prison several times, Sutantar was among the top national Communist leaders jailed by the British administration in the Deoli Detention Centre in the early-1940's.

== Early life ==
Teja Singh Sutantar was born as Samund Singh in 1901 in Aluna a small village in Gurdaspur district. After completing early education, he joined Khalsa College in Amritsar.

== Career ==
Sutantar was a popular Communist leader in the Kirti Kisan Party and later Central Committee member and General Secretary of the Lal Communist Party Hind Union. The party published a magazine, Lal Jhanda, from 1948–1952 under the editorship of Teja Singh Sutantar, managed by Gandharv Sen. Sutantar was among the tallest leaders in undivided Punjab and, post-Partition, on the Indian side who led the struggles of the peasantry, along with the likes of Bhagat Singh Bilga and Baba Bujha Singh. In 1952 Lal Communist Party Hind Union merged into Communist Party of India. He become the president of All India Kisan Sabha from 1968 to 1973. On 12 April 1973 he had a cardiac arrest while taking up the issues of farmers in the Parliament (Lok Sabha). He died there and then and a carry bag of cotton was found with him which when opened, in the presence of then PM, there were two chapatis and a piece of pickle. Every one was amazed at the simplicity of the revolutionary.

== Legacy ==
On 12 April 2023, Punjab Chief Minister Bhagwant Mann unveiled a statue of Teja Singh Sutantar in Nihalgarh village, Sangrur district. The event coincided with the 50th anniversary of Sutantar's passing.
