= Balwant Singh Ramoowalia =

Indian politician (born 1942)

Sardar Balwant Singh Ramoowalia
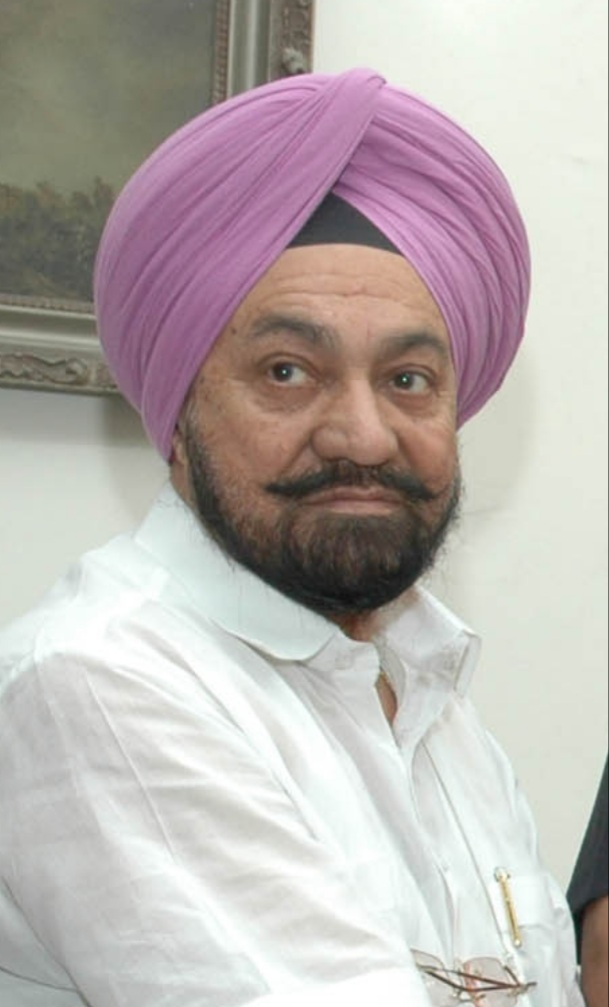

Member of Uttar Pradesh Legislative Council
- In office April 2016 – April 2022

Minister of Social Justice and Empowerment Government of India
- In office 1996–1998
- Preceded by: Kariya Munda
- Succeeded by: Maneka Gandhi

Member of Parliament, Lok Sabha
- In office 1984–1989
- Preceded by: Gurcharan Singh Nihalsinghwala
- Succeeded by: Rajdev Singh
- Constituency: Sangrur

Member of Parliament, Rajya Sabha
- In office 1996–2002
- Constituency: Uttar Pradesh

Minister of Jail Government of Uttar Pradesh
- In office 2015–2017

Personal details
- Born: 15 March 1942 (age 84)
- Party: Samajwadi Party (2015-Present)
- Other political affiliations: Lok Bhalai Party (1999-2011); Shiromani Akali Dal (2011-2015)
- Relations: Spouse Jarnail Kaur Ramoowalia
- Children: Navtej Singh Gill Amanjot Kaur Ramoowalia Navjot Kaur Ramoowalia

Balwant Singh Ramoowalia (born 15 March 1942) is an Indian politician from Samajwadi Party. His father Karnail Singh Paras was a well-known Kavishar. Balwant Singh started his political career with student politics as a general secretary of Student Federation of India in 1963. He went on to join All India Sikh Students' Federation and was its president from 1968 to 1972.

Later he joined Akali Dal and became Member of Parliament from Sangrur. He left Akali Dal to get elected to Rajya Sabha in 1996 and served as the Union Minister for Social Welfare.

== Position held ==
Ramoowalia was

- President of All India Sikh Students Federation, 1968–72
- General Secretary, Students' Federation of India, 1963–64
- Leader of Akali Dal in 8th Lok Sabha
- Member, (i) Senate Punjabi University, Patiala, 1978–80, (ii) Syndicate, Punjabi University, Patiala since 1996, (iii) Board of Indian Airlines, 1991–93, (iv) 6th and 8th Lok Sabha, (v) Public Accounts Committee, 1987–88, (vi) Estimates Committee, 1986–87, (vii) Committee on Public Undertakings, 1988–89, (viii) Business Advisory Committee, 1978–79, (ix) Committee on Petitions, 1978–79, (x) Consultative Committee for the Ministry of Industry, 1985–89, (xi) Consultative Committee for the Ministry of External Affairs, 1978–79 and (xii) Committee on Labour and Welfare
- Union Minister of Social Welfare, 1996–98
- elected to the Rajya Sabha in November, 1996.
- Prison minister in Government of Uttar Pradesh 2015-2017 (Akhilesh Yadav ministry)

== Other associations ==
- Chief Patron, International Punjabi Society
- President, Shiromani Punjabi Sabha
- Member, India International Centre.
- Travels abroad: UK, U.S., Russia, Canada, Netherlands, Australia, Italy, Iraq, Pakistan, Nepal, Sri Lanka, Hong Kong, Japan and Philippines.
- Awarded "Secular Punjabi of the Globe" by the Indo-Canadian Association, Vancouver, British Columbia, Canada.
- Publications: Punjab Di Dhaun Utte Talwar.
