= Bhadaur Assembly constituency =

Legislative Assembly constituency in Punjab State, India

Coordinates: 30.47°N 75.33°E

Bhadaur
- Constituency No. 102 for the Punjab Legislative Assembly

Constituency details
- Country: India
- State: Punjab
- District: Barnala
- Lok Sabha constituency: Sangrur
- Total electors: 157,809 (in 2022)
- Reservation: SC

Member of Legislative Assembly
- 16th Punjab Legislative Assembly
- Incumbent Labh Singh Ugoke
- Party: Aam Aadmi Party
- Elected year: 2022

Bhadaur is a Punjab Legislative Assembly constituency in Barnala district, Punjab state, India. Labh Singh Ugoke represents the constituency in Punjab assembly since 2022.

== Members of the Legislative Assembly ==
Most successful parties from Bhadaur Vidhan Sabha
1. SAD (7 Times) (53.8%)
2. AAP (2 Times) (15.4%)
3. INC (2 Times) (15.4%)
4. BSP (1 Time) (7.69%)
5. CPI (1 Time) (7.69%)

Year	Member	Party
1967	Bachan Singh	Communist Party of India
1969	Bachan Singh	Indian National Congress
1972	Kundan Singh	Shiromani Akali Dal
1977	Kundan Singh	Shiromani Akali Dal
1980	Kundan Singh	Shiromani Akali Dal
1985	Kundan Singh	Shiromani Akali Dal
1992	Nirmal Singh Nimma	Bahujan Samaj Party
1997	Balvir Singh Ghunas	Shiromani Akali Dal
2002	Balvir Singh Ghunas	Shiromani Akali Dal
2007	Balvir Singh Ghunas	Shiromani Akali Dal
2012	Muhammad Sadiq	Indian National Congress
2017	Pirmal Singh Dhaula	Aam Aadmi Party
2022	Labh Singh Ugoke	Aam Aadmi Party

== Election results ==
=== 2027 ===
Punjab Assembly election, 2027: Bhadaur
Party	Candidate	Votes	%	±%
AAP	Labh Singh Ugoke			
AD (WPD)				New entry
INC				
BSP				
SAD				
BJP				New entry
NOTA	None of the above			
Majority				
Turnout				

=== 2022 ===
Assembly Election 2022: Bhadaur
Party	Candidate	Votes	%	±%
AAP	Labh Singh Ugoke	53,967	51.07	New
INC	Charanjit Singh Channi	26,409	21.09	▼8.09
SAD	Satnam Singh	21,183	16.91	▼21.45
SAD(A)	Hans Singh	8,600	12.34	▲10.4
PLC	Dharam Singh Fauji	622	0.5	New
Majority		37,558	29.98	
Turnout		125,247	79.0	
Registered electors		1,57,809		
AAP hold				

=== 2017 ===
Punjab Assembly election, 2017: Bhadaur
Party	Candidate	Votes	%	±%
AAP	Pirmal Singh Dhaula	57,095	44.14	
SAD	Sant Balvir Singh Ghunas	36,311	28.07	
INC	Joginder Singh	26,615	20.57	
SAD(A)	Paramjit Singh	2,095	1.62	
Independent	Bagga Singh	1,157	0.89	
BSP	Karamjit Singh	941	0.73	
CPI(ML)L	Savaran Singh	628	0.49	
Independent	Rajinder Kaur Meemsa	527	0.41	
Independent	Gora Singh	468	0.36	
CPI(M)	Jagdeep Singh	376	0.29	
APP	Gurmit Singh	219	0.17	
NOTA	None of the above	836	0.65	
Majority				
Turnout				
Registered electors		153,195		
AAP gain from INC				

== Previous Results ==
Year	A C No.	Name	Party	Votes	Runner Up	Party	Votes
2012	102	Mohammed Sadique	INC	52825	Darbara Singh Guru	SAD	45856
2007	83	Balvir Singh Ghunas	SAD	38069	Surinder Kaur Balian	INC	37883
2002	84	Balbir Singh Ghunas	SAD	43558	Surinder Kaur	INC	20471
1997	84	Balbir Singh Ghunas	SAD	33207	Mohinder Pal Singh (Pakho)	INC	21680
1992	84	Nirmal Singh Nimma	BSP	1040	Bachan Singh	INC	859
1985	84	Kundan Singh	SAD	29390	Nohinder Pal Singh	INC	12855
1980	84	Kundan Singh	SAD	28996	Bachan Singh	INC (I)	21392
1977	84	Kundan Singh	SAD	24962	Bachan Singh	INC	16269
1972	90	Kundan Singh	SAD	22805	Bachan Singh	INC	17486
1969	90	Bachan Singh	INC	16304	Dhanna Singh	SAD	16106
1967	90	Bachan Singh	CPI	14748	G. Singh	INC	8287
