= Sadhu Singh Dharamsot =

Indian politician

Minister of Forest, Social Welfare, Government of Punjab
- In office 2017–2021
- Cabinet: 2nd Amarinder Singh ministry
- Constituency: Nabha

MLA, Punjab Legislative Assembly
- In office 2017–2022
- Succeeded by: Gurdev Singh Mann (AAP)

Personal details
- Born: 15 January 1960 (age 66) Amloh, Punjab
- Party: Indian National Congress

Sadhu Singh Dharamsot is an Indian politician and former Minister of Forests, Social Welfare in Government of Punjab, India. He is a member of the Indian National Congress. Dharamsot was elected to the Punjab Legislative Assembly from the Nabha constituency of Punjab. Dharamsot had been the five times MLA and former minister in Punjab government.

== Member of Legislative Assembly ==
Dharamsot represented the Nabha Assembly constituency until 2022. He served as the Minister of Forests, Social Welfare in Government of Punjab, India

In the 2022 Punjab Legislative Assembly election he contested from Nabha as a member of the Indian National Congress and was defeated by Aam Aadmi Party's candidate Gurdev Singh Mann by a large margin of 51,554 votes.

== Corruption charges ==
Dharmsot was arrested on 7 June 2022 by the vigilance department of Punjab Police and charged with Prevention of Corruption Act.

State Legislative Assembly
| Preceded by - | Member of the Punjab Legislative Assembly from Nabha Assembly constituency 2017 – 2022 | Succeeded by Gurdev Singh Mann (AAP) |
