= Bawa Harkrishan Singh =

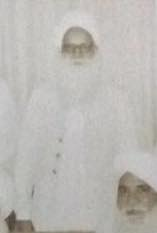
- Bawa Harkrishan Singh in 1956 at Rashtrapati Bhavan

President of Shiromani Gurdwara Prabandhak Committee
- In office 21 May 1955 – 7 July 1955
- Preceded by: Tara Singh
- Succeeded by: Gian Singh Rarewala

Personal details
- Born: 26 July 1892 Dera Ismail Khan, British India (now in Pakistan)
- Died: 20 August 1978 (aged 86) New Delhi

Bawa Harkrishan Singh (26 July 1892 – 20 August 1978) was a politician from Punjab and freedom fighter.

== Early life ==
Singh was born at Dera Ismail Khan on, the son of Bawa Dasaundha Singh. After taking his master's degree in English literature from Forman Christian College, Lahore, in 1912, he joined the Khalsa College at Amritsar, as a lecturer in English. Later, he had a long spell at Khalsa College, Gujranwala, where he remained Principal for many years.

Singh was among the pioneers of the Sikh's Gurdwara Reform Movement of the 1920s. He attended the divan of the Khalsa Baradan in Jallianwala Bagh, Amritsar, on 12 October 1920, and accompanied the group to the Harimandir Sahib and the Akal Takht, which event ushered in the movement for Panthic control of the Sikh's sacred shrines. He was a member of the 9 member provisional committee appointed by the Amritsar deputy commissioner for the management of the Gurdwaras. The Sikhs formed on 15 November 1920 their own 175 member Shiromani Gurdwara Parbandhak Committee.

== Later life ==
Before Independence

Singh took an active part in the Guru ka Bagh agitation of 1922. During the Akali campaign demanding the restoration of the deposed Sikh Maharaja of Nabha State to his throne, both the Shiromani Gurdwara Parbandhak Committee and the Shiromani Akali Dal were outlawed by government. Three Professors of the Khalsa College, Bawa Harkishan Singh, Professor Teja Singh and Professor Nirarijan Singh were taken into custody on 13 October 1923. Professor Teja Singh was released on medical grounds. Professor Nirarijan Singh because of his basic objection to the aims of the movement. Bawa Harkishan Singh served a longer term in jail and was released only when an overall settlement was arrived at with the government. Mehtab Singh, Sardar Bahadur, a senior leader of the agitation, offered to implement the provisions of the Sikh Gurdwaras Act, 1925 as proposed by government. So did some other leaders, among them Bawa Harkishan Singh. The hardliners such as Teja Singh Samundri and Master Tara Singh) who refused to accept the terms suffered further detention. In March 1927 when all detainees were set free the Shiromani Gurdwara Parbandhak Committee set up a forum to formulate the Sikh Rehat Maryada, i.e. code of conduct for the Sikhs. Bawa Harkishan Singh was one of the members of the committee.

The Sikh Gurdwaras Act provided for democratic elections to the Shiromani Gurdwara Parbandhak Committee. This gave birth to factionalism. Singh not only kept himself aloof from these internal acrimonious wranglings but also worked for amity among the groups. He along with some other Sikh leaders formed a society, Gur Sevak Sabha, for this purpose in December 1933. After several months of protracted talks and arguments, the Sabha managed to bring round certain contestants from the Shiromani Akali Dal and the Central Akali Dal to agree on a common list of candidates for the 1936 shrine elections prepared by Sant Vasakha Singh and Sant Javala Singh. The unity so achieved however proved short lived.

== After Independence ==
Singh himself had no political ambitions nor had he ever sought any official position. He was of a shy and retiring nature. However, during the Punjabi Suba movement, he was coopted a member of the Shiromani Gurdwara Parbandhak Committee and, after the arrest of Master Tara Singh on 10 May 1955, elected its president. The morcha or agitation continued with the Jathas or bands of volunteers daily shouting the banned "Punjabi Suba Zindabad" (long live the Punjabi state) slogan and courting arrest. In spite of the restraint shown by the Akalis, police raided the Darbar Sahib complex on 4 July 1955, burst tear gas shells on pilgrims and made many arrests. The morcha continued until the ban on sloganeering was withdrawn on 12 July 1955. Master Tara Singh on release resumed the presidency and Bawa Harkishan Singh again became an unencumbered intellectual committed solely to the Panthic. He remained till the end the adviser and counsellor of the Sikh Panth. At all crucial moments and on all crucial issues, his advice was sought. He never hankered after power or position. Positions of honour and dignity came to him unasked. In 1960, he was nominated a member of the prestigious Punjabi University Commission, but he did not take part in any of the meetings of the commission. He was totally indifferent to fame and exhibition.

Earlier in 1955, he had been called upon to assist a very important Sikh committee in its political negotiations with the Government of India. He was named among the six Sikhs to conduct the talks with the nominees of the government. He kept himself aloof from all active transactions, although he stayed put in Delhi for all those days in Sardar Hukum Singh's residence to make himself available for advice and consultation. The committee on the government side was led by the Prime Minister Jawaharlal Nehru himself, but Bawa Harkishan Singh did not attend any of its sittings. He was of a unique calibre among the Sikhs of his time.

Singh died on 20 August 1978 at the Military Hospital, Delhi Cantt.
