= Rajdev Singh =

Indian politician

Member of Parliament, Lok Sabha
- In office 1989-1991
- Preceded by: Balwant Singh Ramoowalia
- Succeeded by: Gurcharan Singh Dadhahoor
- Constituency: Sangrur, Punjab

Personal details
- Born: 11 October 1951 (age 74) Patiala, Punjab, India
- Party: Shiromani Akali Dal (Simranjit Singh Mann) till 2015; Rashtriya Sikh Sangat; Aam Aadmi Party (2016-2018); Shiromani Akali Dal (Taksali) (11.01.2019-30.04.2019); Bhartiya Lok Sewa Dal (30.04.2019)

Rajdev Singh is an Indian politician and belonged to Shiromani Akali Dal (Taksali).He was elected to the Lok Sabha, lower house of the Parliament of India from Sangrur in Punjab on the ticket of Shiromani Akali Dal (Simranjit Singh Mann)
