= Gurcharan Singh Dadhahoor =

Indian politician

Member of Parliament, Lok Sabha
- In office 1991-1996
- Preceded by: Rajdev Singh
- Succeeded by: Surjit Singh Barnala
- Constituency: Sangrur, Punjab

Personal details
- Born: 15 February 1942 Barnala, Sangrur district, Punjab, British India
- Party: Indian National Congress

Gurcharan Singh Dadhahoor is an Indian politician belonging to the Indian National Congress. He was elected to the Lok Sabha, lower house of the Parliament of India, from Sangrur in Punjab.
