= Dalit Kisan Dal =

Political party in Punjab

Dalit Kisan Dal (Dalit Peasants Party), is a political party in Punjab, India. The party was formed as a splinter group from Lok Bhalai Party 2001, when activists from LBP in Khamano, Machhiwara, Ropar and Samrala broke away. As of 2001 the general secretary of DKD was Bhinder Singh Ranwan, and the party president was Iqbal Singh Kapurthala. The party claims to fight for better conditions for peasants and dalits.
