= Barinder Kumar Goyal =

Indian politician

MLA, Punjab Legislative Assembly
- Incumbent
- Assumed office 2022
- Constituency: Lehra
- Majority: Aam Aadmi Party

Personal details
- Party: Aam Aadmi Party
- Education: BALLB
- Known for: Social services

Barinder Kumar Goyal Vakeel is an Indian politician and the MLA representing the Lehra Assembly constituency in the Punjab Legislative Assembly. He is a member of the Aam Aadmi Party. He contested the election in 1992 and lost. He ran again and won in 2022. He is chairman of the committee on subordinate legislation. On 23 September 2024 he joined the cabinet of Sardar Bhagwant Singh Maan as water resource, mining and soil and water conservation minister. He was elected as the MLA in the 2022 Punjab Legislative Assembly election.

== Member of Legislative Assembly ==
He was Chairman (2022–23) of the Committee on Subordinate Legislation.

== Electoral performance ==
Punjab Assembly election, 2022: Lehra
Party	Candidate	Votes	%	±%
AAP	Barinder Kumar Goyal	60,058	43.59	▲
SAD(S)	Parminder Singh Dhindsa	33,540	24.34	▲
INC	Rajinder Kaur Bhattal	20,450	14.84	▼
SAD	Gobind Singh Longowal	12,038	8.74	▼
SAD(M)	Sher Singh	4,991	3.62	
Independent	Satwant Singh	1,546	1.12	
NOTA	None of the above	1,071	0.78	
Majority		26,518	19.25	
Turnout		137,776	79.63	
Registered electors		173,020		

State Legislative Assembly
Preceded by -	Member of the Punjab Legislative Assembly from Lehra Assembly constituency 2022 –	Incumbent
