= Gurdev Singh Mann =

Indian politician

MLA, Punjab Legislative Assembly
- Incumbent
- Assumed office 2022
- Preceded by: Sadhu Singh Dharamsot (INC)
- Constituency: Nabha
- Majority: Aam Aadmi Party

Personal details
- Party: Aam Aadmi Party

Gurdev Singh Mann is an Indian politician and the MLA representing the Nabha Assembly constituency in the Punjab Legislative Assembly. He is a member of the Aam Aadmi Party. He was elected as the MLA in the 2022 Punjab Legislative Assembly election. He had unsuccessfully contested the 2017 Punjab Legislative Assembly election.

== Member of Legislative Assembly ==
Mann represents the Nabha Assembly constituency since 2022 after winning the election. The Aam Aadmi Party gained a strong 79% majority in the sixteenth Punjab Legislative Assembly by winning 92 out of 117 seats in the 2022 Punjab Legislative Assembly election. MP Bhagwant Mann was sworn in as Chief Minister on 16 March 2022.

In the 2022 Punjab Legislative Assembly election he contested from Nabha as a member of the Aam Aadmi Party and defeated Shiromani Akali Dal's candidate and the sitting MLA of that time, Sadhu Singh Dharamsot by a large margin of 51,554 votes. Dharamsot had been the five times MLA and former minister in Punjab government.

Committee assignments of Punjab Legislative Assembly

- Member (2022–23) Committee on Subordinate Legislation
- Member (2022–23) Committee on Petitions

== Electoral performance ==
Punjab Assembly election, 2022: Nabha
| Party | Candidate | Votes | % | ±% |
|---|---|---|---|---|
| AAP | Gurdev Singh Dev Mann | 82,053 | 58.0 | |
| SAD | Kabir Dass | 29,453 | 20.80 | |
| INC | Sadhu Singh Dharamsot | 18,251 | 12.78 | |
| BJP | Gurpreet Singh Shahpur | 6,444 | 4.51 | |
| SSP | Barinder Kumar | 3,014 | 2.11 | |
| NOTA | None of the above | 1,424 | 0.8 | |
| Majority | | 52,600 | 36.83 | |
| Turnout | | 142,819 | 77.1 | |
| Registered electors | | 185,308 | | |
| AAP gain from INC | | Swing | | |

State Legislative Assembly
| Preceded by Sadhu Singh Dharamsot (INC) | Member of the Punjab Legislative Assembly from Nabha Assembly constituency 2022 – | Incumbent |
