= Punjab Assembly Committee on Petitions =

Committee on Petitions
Committee of the House
- 16th Punjab Assembly
- State: Punjab

Leadership
- Chaiperson: Mohammad Jamil Ur Rahman
- Chairperson party: Aam Aadmi Party
- Appointer: Punjab Assembly speaker

Structure
- Seats: 13
- Political Parties: AAP (7); INC (2); BJP (1)
- Election criteria: The members are elected every year from amongst its members of house according to the principle of proportional representation.
- Tenure: 1 Year

Jurisdiction
- Purpose: Legislative oversight of the Petitions

Rules & Procedure
- Applicable rules: Article 208 of the Constitution of India section 32 of the States Reorganisation Act, 1956; Rules 232(1) and 2(b) of Rules of Procedure and Conduct of Business in Punjab Legislative Assembly

Punjab Assembly Committee on Petitions of Punjab Legislative Assembly is constituted annually for a one year period from among the members of the Assembly. This Committee consists of thirteen members.

== Appointment ==
The speaker appoints the committee and its members every year for a one year term according to the powers conferred by Article 208 of the Constitution of India read with section 32 of the States Reorganisation Act, 1956 (37 of 1956), and in pursuance of Rules 232(1) and 2(b) of the Rules of Procedure and Conduct of Business in the Punjab Legislative Assembly.

== Members ==
For the one year period starting May 2022, the Committee on Petitions of 16th Punjab Assembly had following members:

Committee on Petitions (2022–23)
Sr. No.	Name	Post	Party
1	Mohammad Jamil Ur Rahman	Chairperson	AAP
2	Amandeep Singh Musafir	Member	AAP
3	Amansher Singh (Shery Kalsi)	Member	AAP
4	Ashok Parashar Pappi	Member	AAP
5	Gurdev Singh Dev Maan	Member	AAP
6	Hardeep Singh Mundian	Member	AAP
7	Jangi Lal Mahajan	Member	BJP
8	Jasvir Singh Raja Gill	Member	AAP
9	Labh Singh Ugoke	Member	AAP
10	Manjinder Singh Lalpura	Member	AAP
11	Narinder Kaur Bharaj	Member	AAP
12	Raj Kumar Chabewal	Member	INC
13	Vikramjit Singh Chaudhary	Member	INC

== Chairpersons ==
Tenure	Terms	Name	Political party
2021-22	1	Gurkirat Singh Kotli	Indian National Congress
2022-23	1	Mohammad Jamil Ur Rahman	Aam Aadmi Party

== Previous members ==
For the one year period in the 15th Punjab Assembly the committee had following members:

=== 2021-2022 ===
Committee on Petitions (2021–22)
Sr. No.	Name	Post	Party
1.	Balbir Singh Sidhu	Chairperson	INC
2.	S. Amarjit Singh Sandoya	Member	INC
3.	Sh. Arun Dogra	Member	INC
4.	Sh. Avtar Singh Junior	Member	INC
5.	Shri.Baldev Singh Khaira	Member	INC
6.	S. Gurpreet Singh	Member	INC
7.	S. Jai Krishan Singh	Member	INC
8.	S. Kuljit Singh Nagra	Member	INC
9.	S. Lakhvir Singh Lakha	Member	INC
10.	S. Manpreet Singh Ayali	Member	INC
11.	Smt. Satkar Kaur	Member	INC
12.	S. Sukhjit Singh	Member	INC
13.	S. Sukhpal Singh Bhullar	Member	INC

=== 2019-2020 ===
Committee on Petitions (2019–20)
Sr. No.	Name	Post	Party
1.	S. Gurkirat Singh Kotli	Chairperson	INC
2.	S. Amarjit Singh Sandoa	Member	INC
3.	S. Angad Singh	Member	INC
4.	S. Dalvir Singh Goldy	Member	INC
5.	Sh.Dinesh Singh	Member	INC
6.	S. Gurpreet Singh	Member	INC
7.	S. Harinder Pal Singh Chandumajra	Member	INC
8.	S. Kanwarjit Singh	Member	INC
9.	S. Lakhvir Singh Lakha	Member	INC
10.	S. Navtej Singh Cheema	Member	INC
11.	Smt. Rupinder Kaur Ruby	Member	INC
12.	Sh. Sanjeev Talwar	Member	INC
13.	S. Sukhpal Singh Bhullar	Member	INC

=== 2018-2019 ===
Committee on Petitions (2018–19)
Sr. No.	Name	Post	Party
1.	S. Gurkirat Singh Kotli	Chairperson	INC
2.	S. Dalvir Singh Goldy	Member	INC
3.	Sh.Darshan Lal	Member	INC
4.	S.Dilraj Singh	Member	INC
5.	Sh.Dinesh Singh	Member	INC
6.	S. Gurmeet Singh Meet Haher	Member	INC
7.	S. Gurpreet Singh	Member	INC
8.	S. Kanwarjit Singh	Member	INC
9.	S. Lakhvir Singh Lakha	Member	INC
10.	S. Navtej Singh Cheema	Member	INC
11.	Miss Rupinder Kaur Ruby	Member	INC
12.	Sh. Sanjeev Talwar	Member	INC
13.	S. Sukhpal Singh Bhullar	Member	INC

=== 2017-2018 ===
Committee on Petitions (2017–18)
Sr. No.	Name	Post	Party
1.	S. Darshan Singh Brar	Chairperson	INC
2.	S. Baldev Singh	Member	INC
3.	S. Balwinder Singh	Member	INC
4.	Sh.Darshan Lal	Member	INC
5.	Sh. Fatehjung Singh Bajwa	Member	INC
6.	S. Harinderpal Singh Chandumajra	Member	INC
7.	S. Jagdev Singh	Member	INC
8.	S. Khushaldeep Singh Kiki Dhillon	Member	INC
9.	S.Lakhbir Singh LodhiNagal	Member	INC
10.	Sh. Rajnesh Kumar Babbi	Member	INC
11.	Sardar Santokh Singh	Member	INC
12.	Sardar Sukhjit Singh	Member	INC
13.	Sh. Som Parkash	Member	INC
