= Lok Bhalai Party =

- Abbreviation: LBP
- Leader: Balwant Singh Ramoowalia
- Founder: Balwant Singh Ramoowalia
- Founded: 1999
- Merged into: Shiromani Akali Dal, 2011
- Ideology: Punjabiyat

Party flag

Lok Bhalai Party (LBP) is a defunct Indian regional political party active mainly in Punjab. It was founded by former Union Minister Balwant Singh Ramoowalia in 1999. It merged into Akali Dal (Badal) in November 2011. Later it was relaunched in July 2018.

== Objectives ==
The party is mainly focused on the issues related to Punjabis migrating to other countries. In that respect, it took up causes of people duped by travel agents, issues related to wedding of Punjabi girls with non-resident Indians.

== See also ==
- Political parties of India
- Politics of India
- Dalit Kisan Dal
