= Lal Communist Party Hind Union =

- Secretary-General: Teja Singh Swatantar
- Founded: 5 January 1948
- Dissolved: 1952
- Split from: Communist Party of India
- Merged into: Communist Party of India
- Newspaper: Lal Jhanda
- Ideology: Marxism-Leninism
- Punjab Legislative Assembly (1952): 1 / 126
- PEPSU Legislative Assembly (1952): 1 / 60

The Lal Communist Party Hind Union ('Red Communist Party, Indian Union') was a political party in Punjab, India. The party was led by Teja Singh Swatantar. It led militant agrarian struggles in the PEPSU regions. The Lal Communist Party merged back into the Communist Party of India in 1952.

== Nakodar conference ==
The Lal Communist Party was founded by Kirtis and Ghadarites in January 1948, as they broke away from the Communist Party of India. The founding conference of the party took place in Nakodar, Jalandhar district on 5–8 January 1948. Some 300 delegates participated in the meeting, representing 1,500 party members. The foundation of the Lal Communist Party marked the first major split in the Indian communist movement. The split was due to political differences. The Kirtis, whilst being members of CPI, had retained a sense of Ghadarite romantic idealism, and resisted instructions from the CPI party leadership. The new party reactivated the old Kirti Party district and area committees. It called for armed revolution.

== Leadership ==
The Nakodar conference elected a Central Committee and a Punjab State Committee for the party. The Central Committee consisted of Teja Singh Swantantra (general secretary), Bhag Singh, Ram Singh Dutt, Bujha Singh, Wadhawa Ram, Chhajju Mal Vaid and Gurcharan Singh Sehnsra. The Punjab State Committee consisted of Chain Singh Chain (secretary), Vishnu Dutt, Harbans Singh Karnana, Giani Santa Singh, Ajmer Singh Bharu, Dharam Singh Fakkar, Paras Ram Kangra, Kanwar Lal Singh and Chanan Singh Tugalwal.

The party published the fortnightly Lal Jhanda ('Red Flag') in Hindi, Punjabi and English. Teja Singh Swatantra was the editor of Lal Jhanda and Gandharv Sen its manager.

== Goa ==
A leader of the Lal Communist Party, Pandit Kishori Lal, was sent to Goa along with a group of fighters to take on the Portuguese rule there. One of the volunteers, Karnail Singh Eesru, was killed in that struggle.

== Peasant struggles ==
The Lal Communist Party was stronger in the PEPSU areas in the Punjab State proper. Compared to the CPI in Punjab, the Lal Communist Party had a stronger base amongst poor peasants. The government began to arrest Lal Communist Party leaders, and in response Teja Singh Swatantra and other key leaders went underground. In the underground the party leadership began preparations for militant agrarian struggles. Three areas of action were identified; PEPSU, Pathankot tehsil in Gurdaspur district and some other areas where the party was less influential. Baba Bujha Singh was put in charge of organising the movement in the PEPSU areas.

The party began mobilising militant mass struggles amongst the peasantry, organising large meetings and calling on peasants not to share their crops with landlords. The party built up an armed wing, that began killing landlords in areas of conflict. In 1949 the fighters of the party clashed with police at Kishangarh, a fight in which one sub-inspector was killed. The police forces had to flee the village. The army was sent to put out the armed activities of the party. After two days, with six killed and 26 party members arrested, the party had to surrender.

== 1952 elections ==
The Lal Communist Party contested the Punjab and PEPSU Legislative Assembly elections held on 27 March 1952. The party presented five candidates in PEPSU (Sangrur, Sunam, Lehra and two candidates in the multi-member constituency Phagwara). In Punjab the party presented nine candidates (Balachar, Gharhshankar, Nawanshehr, Nurmahal, Nakodar, Bagha Purana, Patti, Tarn Tarn and Sri Gobind Pur). The election symbol of the party was a railway engine. It managed to win the Sunam seat in the PEPSU assembly and the Bagha Purana seat in the Punjab assembly. Both of the assembly members of the party were named Bachan Singh bakhshiwala (one living in Sunam and one living in Moga).

== Merger with CPI ==
Merger talks between the CPI Punjab unit and the Lal Communist Party began in 1951.

The agrarian struggles of the Lal Communist Party lasted until 1952. In that year the campaign bore fruit, as permanent tenants became land owners. Some non-permanent tenants also became land owners. On the other hand, there was a part of the party leadership that criticised the way Teja Singh Swatantra organised the armed struggle. The critics argued that there couldn't be an armed revolution without a people's uprising. The guerrillas of Lal Communist Party had become involved in daciotry as they robbed a bank in Rae Bareli, which the critics found inappropriate.

The Lal Communist Party approached the CPI to discuss reunification, albeit Teja Singh Swatantra opposed the idea. The CPI leadership responded positively. A party meeting was held at Dalel Singh Wala, which unanimously decided to dissolve the Lal Communist Party and unconditionally join CPI. As the two communist parties processed their merger, the arrest warrants against most of the Lal Communist Party cadres were cancelled in May 1952.

The merger of the two parties was completed in July 1952.

== Aftermath ==
To join CPI, ex-Lal Communist Party members had to apply for membership and author a written confession of self-criticism. Whilst the majority of ex-Lal Communist Party members joined CPI (both in the leadership and grassroots), hundreds of ex-Lal Communist Party members were denied entry into CPI (including Baba Bujha Singh). Amongst the people that did not join CPI, some went into dacoity or religious asceticism.

Within CPI the former Lal Communist Party members continued to act as a faction of its own for some time. However, the ex-Lal Communist Party faction was gradually marginalised by the right-wing tendency in the party leadership. But when CPI was divided in 1964, many former Lal Communist Party cadres stayed with the right-wing CPI. In particular Teja Singh Swatantra continued to be an important leader inside CPI. In the Sangrur, Patiala and Bhatinda districts many former Lal Communist Party activists stayed in CPI. The militant struggles of the Lal Communist Party provided a legacy of the Naxalite movement. Some former Lal Communist Party cadres joined the Naxalites (such as Baba Bujha Singh) and the epicentres of Punjabi Naxalite activity tended to be the former strongholds of the Lal Communist Party.

== See also ==
- Pakistan Communist Party
