= Brish Bhan =

Indian politician

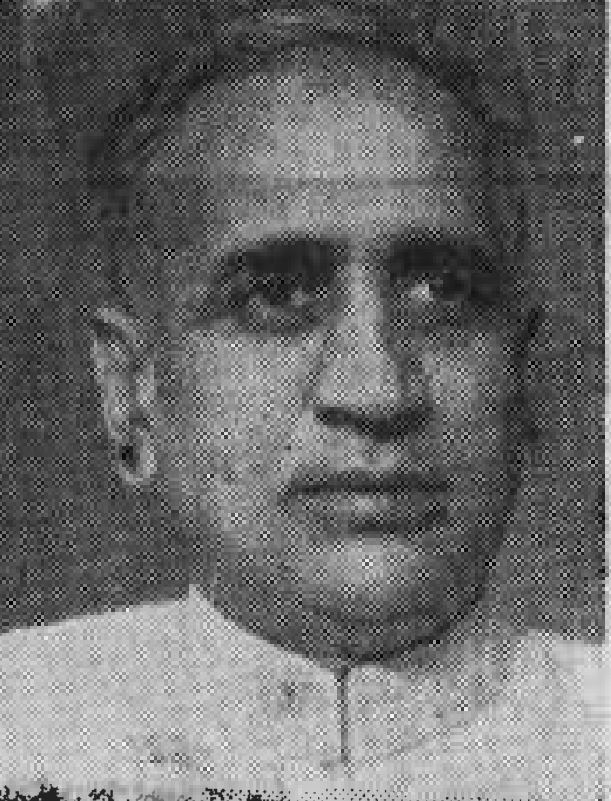

3rd Chief Minister of PEPSU
- In office 12 January 1955 – 1 November 1956
- Preceded by: Raghbir Singh
- Succeeded by: Position abolished
- Constituency: Kalayat

Deputy Chief Minister of PEPSU
- In office 8 March 1954 – 12 January 1955
- Preceded by: Position established
- Succeeded by: Position abolished

Deputy Premier of PEPSU
- In office 23 May 1951 – 21 April 1952

Member of the Punjab Legislative Assembly
- In office 1967–1969
- Constituency: Lehra
- In office 1962–1967
- Constituency: Sunam

Personal details
- Born: 9 September 1908 Moonak, Patiala State, British India
- Died: 29 April 1988 (aged 79) Chandigarh, India
- Party: Indian National Congress
- Children: 3

Babu Brish Bhan (9 September 1908 – 29 April 1988) was an Indian independence activist and politician who served as the final Chief Minister of the Patiala and East Punjab States Union from 1955 to 1956. He was also the only deputy chief minister of the state.

He completed his law from Law College Lahore in 1932. In 1951 and then in 1954 he became the deputy chief minister under the chief ministership of Raghbir Singh. After the death of Raghbir Singh he became the Chief Minister in 1955.

After the merger of the PEPSU with Punjab State on 1 November 1956 following the States Reorganisation Act, he became the member of the Punjab Legislative Assembly in 1962 from Sunam. He later represented Lehra from 1967.

He died on 29 April 1988. The Babu Brish Bhan DAV School at Moonak in Sangrur district is named after him.
