= Labh Singh Ugoke =

Indian politician

Member of Punjab Legislative Assembly
- Incumbent
- Assumed office 2022
- Preceded by: Pirmal Singh Dhaula (AAP)
- Constituency: Bhadaur

Personal details
- Party: Aam Aadmi Party
- Profession: Politician

Labh Singh Ugoke is an Indian politician and the MLA in the Punjab Legislative Assembly representing the Bhadaur Assembly constituency in Punjab, India, since 2022. Prior to entering politics, he owned a mobile repair shop in his village. He is a member of the Aam Aadmi Party.

== Member of Legislative Assembly ==
He represents the Bhadaur Assembly constituency as MLA in Punjab Assembly.

Committee assignments of Punjab Legislative Assembly

- Member (2022–23) Committee on Welfare of Scheduled Castes, Scheduled Tribes and Backward Classes
- Member (2022–23) Committee on Petitions

== Controversy ==
In January 2023, a video circulated in which Ugoke is seen telling a man (who was opposing the conversion of a Primary Health Centre (PHC) into an Aam Aadmi Clinic) that if a non-AAP government were in power, the man would have been 'thrashed' and 'thrown in jail.'

== Electoral performance ==
In 2022 Punjab Legislative Assembly election Ugoke defeated the incumbent Chief minister of Punjab, Charanjit Singh Channi. The Aam Aadmi Party gained a strong 79% majority in the sixteenth Punjab Legislative Assembly by winning 92 out of 117 seats in the 2022 Punjab Legislative Assembly election. MP Bhagwant Mann was sworn in as Chief Minister on 16 March 2022.

Assembly Election 2022: Bhadaur
Party	Candidate	Votes	%	±%
AAP	Labh Singh Ugoke	53,967	51.07	New
INC	Charanjit Singh Channi	26,409	21.09	▼8.09
SAD	Satnam Singh	21,183	16.91	▼21.45
PLC	Dharam Singh Fauji	261	0.21	New
SAD(A)	Hans Singh	8600	12.34	▲10.4
Majority		37,558	29.98	
Turnout				
Registered electors		1,57,809		
AAP hold				

== Personal life ==
His mother Baldev Kaur worked as a sweeper in a government run school.

State Legislative Assembly
Preceded by Pirmal Singh Dhaula (AAP)	Member of the Punjab Legislative Assembly from Bhadaur Assembly constituency 2022 –	Incumbent
