= Mohammad Jamil Ur Rahman =

Indian politician

Mohammad Jamil-Ur-Rahman
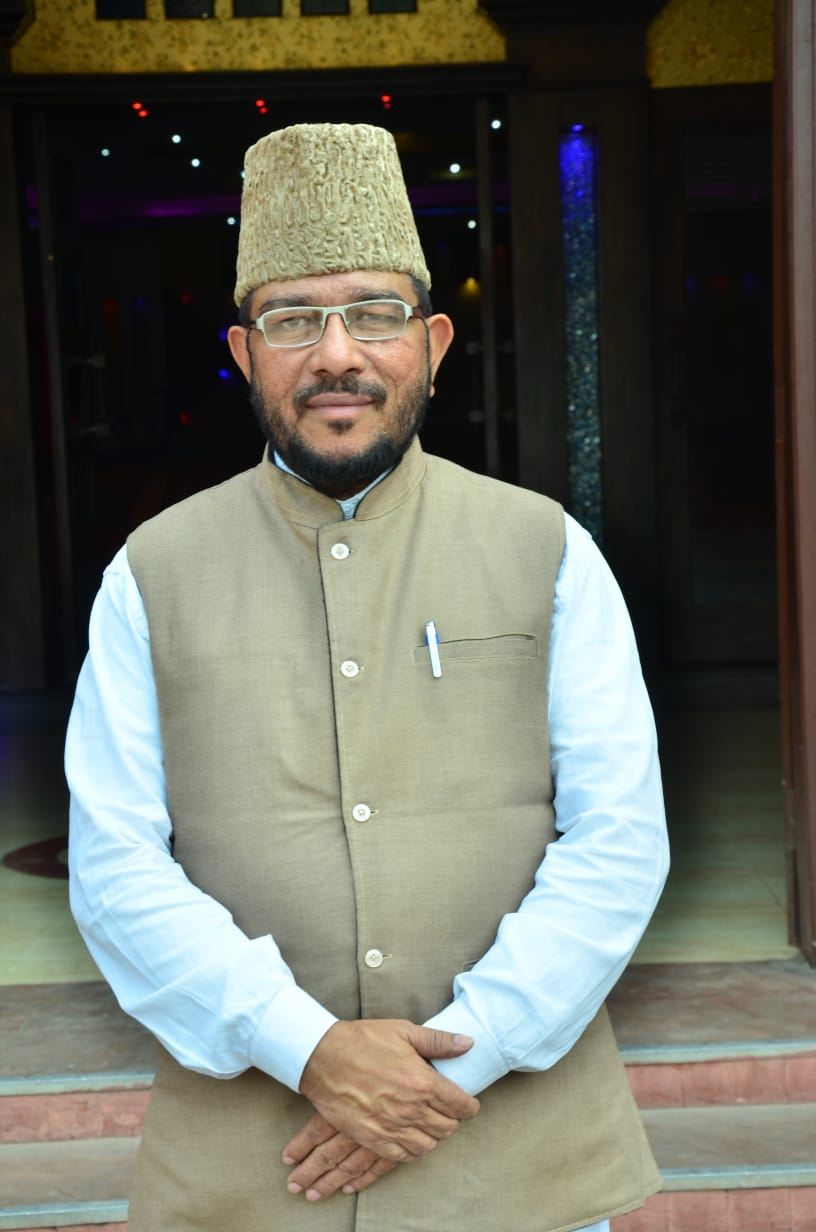

MLA, Punjab Legislative Assembly
- Incumbent
- Assumed office 17 March 2022
- Preceded by: Razia Sultana
- Constituency: Malerkotla
- Majority: Aam Aadmi Party

Personal details
- Born: (06/11/1959) Malerkotla
- Party: Aam Aadmi Party
- Education: MA, B.Ed., PhD
- Alma mater: Government College, Malerkotla, Punjabi University, Patiala
- Occupation: Politician
- Committees: Chairman, Petition Committee, Punjab Legislative assembly 2022-23 | Chairman, Paper Laid and Library Committee, Punjab Legislative assembly 2023-24
- Website: /Mohammad Jamil.rahman

Mohammad Jamil Ur Rahman is an Indian politician and the MLA representing the Malerkotla Assembly constituency in the Punjab Legislative Assembly. He is a member of the Aam Aadmi Party. He was elected as the MLA in the 2022 Punjab Legislative Assembly election. He had completed his PhD on the descendants of Guru Nanak Dev in 2015 from Punjabi University, Patiala.

== MLA ==
The Aam Aadmi Party gained a strong 79% majority in the sixteenth Punjab Legislative Assembly by winning 92 out of 117 seats in the 2022 Punjab Legislative Assembly election. MP Bhagwant Mann was sworn in as Chief Minister on 16 March 2022.

Committee assignments of Punjab Legislative Assembly

- Chairman (2022–23) Committee on Petitions

== Electoral performance ==
Punjab Assembly election, 2022: Malerkotla
Party	Candidate	Votes	%	±%
AAP	Mohammad Jamil Ur Rehman	65,948	52.32	
INC	Razia Sultana	44,262	35.12	
SAD	Nusrat Ali Khan	8,421	6.68	
PLC	F. Nesara Khatton	3,766	2.99	
NOTA	None of the above	687	0.55	
Majority		21,686	17.2	
Turnout		1,26,042	78.59	
Registered electors		1,60,388		
AAP gain from INC		Swing		

State Legislative Assembly
Preceded by -	Member of the Punjab Legislative Assembly from Malerkotla Assembly constituency 2022 –	Incumbent
