= Nihalgarh =

- Village
- Location in Punjab, India Nihalgarh (India)
- Coordinates: 31.538019°N 75.408251°E
- Country: India
- State: Punjab
- District: Kapurthala

Government
  - Type: Panchayati raj (India)
  - Body: Gram panchayat

Population (2011)
  - Total: 479
- Sex ratio 250/229♂/♀

Languages
  - Official: Punjabi
  - Other spoken: Hindi
- Time zone: UTC+5:30 (IST)
- PIN: 144408
- Telephone code: 01822
- ISO 3166 code: IN-PB
- Vehicle registration: PB-09
- Website: kapurthala.gov.in

Nihalgarh is a village in Kapurthala district of Punjab State, India. It is located 20 kilometres (12 mi) from Kapurthala, which is both district and sub-district headquarters of Nihalgarh. The village is administrated by a Sarpanch who is an elected representative of village as per the constitution of India and Panchayati raj (India).

== Demography ==
According to the report published by Census India in 2011, Nihalgarh has 92 houses with the total population of 479 persons of which 250 are male and 229 females. Literacy rate of Nihalgarh is 78.14%, higher than the state average of 75.84%. The population of children in the age group 0–6 years is 49 which is 10.23% of the total population. Child sex ratio is approximately 1130, higher than the state average of 846.

== Population data ==
| Particulars | Total | Male | Female |
|---|---|---|---|
| Total No. of Houses | 92 | - | - |
| Population | 479 | 250 | 229 |
| Child (0-6) | 49 | 23 | 26 |
| Schedule Caste | 228 | 117 | 111 |
| Schedule Tribe | 0 | 0 | 0 |
| Literacy | 78.14 % | 87.67 % | 67.49 % |
| Total Workers | 144 | 130 | 14 |
| Main Worker | 138 | 0 | 0 |
| Marginal Worker | 6 | 4 | 2 |
