= Lehra Assembly constituency =

Legislative Assembly constituency in Punjab State, India

Coordinates: 29.94°N 75.81°E

Lehra
- Constituency No. 99 for the Punjab Legislative Assembly

Constituency details
- Country: India
- State: Punjab
- District: Sangrur
- Lok Sabha constituency: Sangrur
- Total electors: 173,020
- Reservation: None

Member of Legislative Assembly
- 16th Punjab Legislative Assembly
- Incumbent Barinder Kumar Goyal
- Party: Aam Aadmi Party
- Elected year: 2022

Lehra Assembly constituency is a Punjab Legislative Assembly constituency in Sangrur district, Punjab state, India.

Rajinder Kaur Bhattal (INC), who was the first and only female Chief minister of Punjab. She won five consecutive times from Lehra constituency from 1992.

== List of MLAs ==
Most successful parties from Lehra Vidhan Sabha
1. INC (9 Times) (47.4%)
2. SAD (7 Times) (36.8%)
3. AAP (1 Time) (5.26%)
4. CPI (1 Time) (5.26%)
5. IND (1 Time) (5.26%)

| Name | Portrait | Term of office | | Political party (Alliance) |
|---|---|---|---|---|
As part of PEPSU Legislative Assembly (1951–56)
| Pritam Singh | | 1952 | 1954 | Shiromani Akali Dal |
| Brish Bhan | | 1952 | 1954 | Indian National Congress |
| Pritam Singh Gujran | | 1954 | 1956 | Shiromani Akali Dal |
| Pritam Singh Sahoke | | 1954 | 1956 | Shiromani Akali Dal |
Constituency defunct (1956-1962)
As part of Punjab Legislative Assembly (1962–Present)
| Pritam Singh | | 1962 | 1967 | Indian National Congress |
| Brish Bhan | | 1967 | 1969 | Indian National Congress |
| Harchand Singh Longowal | | 1969 | 1970 | Shiromani Akali Dal |
| H. Singh | | 1970 | 1972 | Shiromani Akali Dal |
| Harish Bhan | | 1972 | 1977 | Indian National Congress |
| Chitwant Singh | | 1977 | 1980 | Independent politician |
| Amar Singh | | 1980 | 1985 | Communist Party of India |
| Inderjit Singh | | 1985 | 1987 | Shiromani Akali Dal |
| President's Rule | | 1987 | 1992 | Governor of Punjab |
| Rajinder Kaur Bhattal | | 1992 | 1997 | Indian National Congress |
| Rajinder Kaur Bhattal | | 1997 | 2002 | Indian National Congress |
| Rajinder Kaur Bhattal | | 2002 | 2007 | Indian National Congress |
| Rajinder Kaur Bhattal | | 2007 | 2012 | Indian National Congress |
| Rajinder Kaur Bhattal | | 2012 | 2017 | Indian National Congress |
| Parminder Singh Dhindsa | | 2017 | 2022 | Shiromani Akali Dal |
| Barinder Kumar Goyal | | 2022 | Incumbent | Aam Aadmi Party |

== Election results ==
=== 2027 ===
Punjab Assembly election, 2027: Lehra
| Party | Candidate | Votes | % | ±% |
|---|---|---|---|---|
| AAP | | | | |
| AD (WPD) | | | | New entry |
| INC | | | | |
| BSP | | | | |
| SAD | | | | |
| BJP | | | | New entry |
| NOTA | None of the above | | | |
| Majority | | | | |
| Turnout | | | | |

=== 2022 ===
2022 Punjab Legislative Assembly election: Lehra
| Party | Candidate | Votes | % | ±% |
|---|---|---|---|---|
| AAP | Barinder Kumar Goyal | 60,058 | 43.59 | ▲ |
| SAD(S) | Parminder Singh Dhindsa | 33,540 | 24.34 | ▲ |
| INC | Rajinder Kaur Bhattal | 20,450 | 14.84 | ▼ |
| SAD | Gobind Singh Longowal | 12,038 | 8.74 | ▼ |
| SAD(M) | Sher Singh | 4,991 | 3.62 | |
| IND | Satwant Singh | 1,546 | 1.12 | |
| NOTA | None of the above | 1,071 | 0.78 | |
| Majority | | 26,518 | 19.25 | |
| Turnout | | 137,776 | 79.63 | |
| Registered electors | | 173,020 | | |

=== 2017 ===
2017 Punjab Legislative Assembly election: Lehra
| Party | Candidate | Votes | % | ±% |
|---|---|---|---|---|
| SAD | Parminder Singh Dhindsa | 65,550 | 47.4 | |
| INC | Rajinder Kaur Bhattal | 38,735 | 28.0 | |
| AAP | Jasvir Singh | 25,089 | 18.2 | |
| NOTA | None of the Above | 962 | 0.6 | |
| Majority | | 26,815 | 19.5 | |
| Turnout | | 137,242 | 85.3 | |
| Registered electors | | 162,111 | | |

=== 2012 ===
2012 Punjab Legislative Assembly election: Lehra
| Party | Candidate | Votes | % | ±% |
|---|---|---|---|---|
| INC | Rajinder Kaur Bhattal | 44,706 | 37.27 | |
| SAD | Sukhwant Singh | 41,351 | 34.48 | |
| PPoP | Bhagwant Mann | 26,136 | 21.79 | |
| BSP | Jagjit Singh | 3,232 | 2.69 | |
| Independent | Rajvir Singh | 1,725 | 1.44 | |
| Majority | | 3,355 | | |
| Turnout | | 119,944 | 85.52 | |
| Registered electors | | | | |

== See also ==
- Punjab Legislative Assembly
- List of constituencies of the Punjab Legislative Assembly
- Sangrur district
