= Gian Singh Rarewala =

Indian politician (1901–1979)

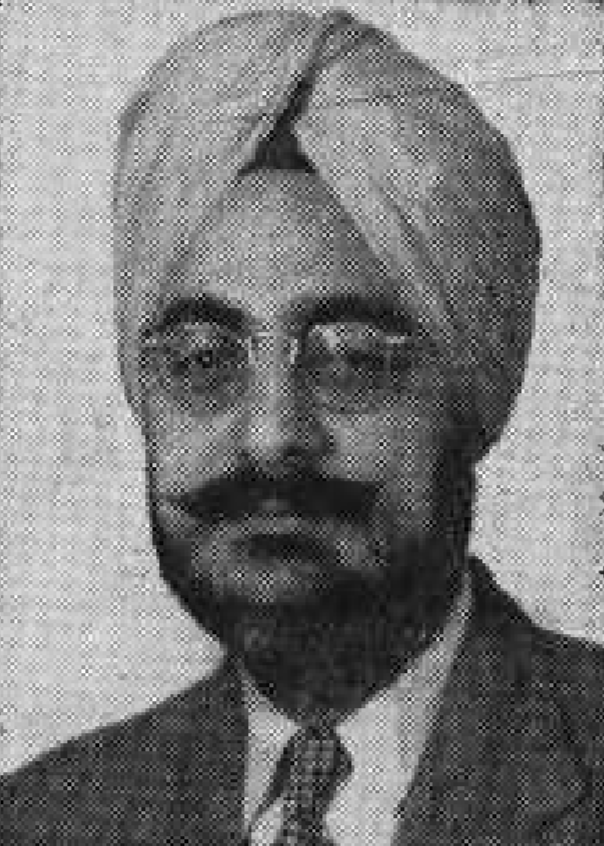

Leader of opposition in Punjab assembly
- In office 9 March 1967 – 24 November 1967
- Preceded by: Gurnam Singh
- Succeeded by: Gurnam Singh
- Constituency: Payal

Chief Minister of the Patiala and East Punjab States Union
- In office 22 April 1952 – 5 March 1953
- Preceded by: Raghbir Singh
- Succeeded by: President's rule
- Constituency: Amloh

1st Premier of PEPSU
- In office 15 July 1948 – 23 May 1951
- Preceded by: Post Established
- Succeeded by: Raghbir Singh

President of Shiromani Gurdwara Parbandhak Committee
- In office 7 July 1955 – 16 October 1955
- Preceded by: Bawa Harkrishan Singh
- Succeeded by: Tara Singh

Personal details
- Born: 16 December 1901 Rara Village, Patiala State (now in Punjab, India)
- Died: 31 December 1979 (aged 78)
- Party: Shiromani Akali Dal (1968-1979)
- Other political affiliations: Independent (till 1956); Indian National Congress (1956-1968)
- Children: Nirlep Kaur

Sardar Gian Singh Rarewala (16 December 1901 – 31 December 1979) was an Indian politician and the first Chief Minister (designated at the time as prime minister) of the former state of the Patiala and East Punjab States Union. He was also a Member of the Punjab Legislative Assembely multiple times.

== Personal life and background ==
Rarewala was born on 16 December 1901, at Rara village, Payal, Patiala State. He was a descendant of Ratan Singh Bhangu, author of Panth Prakash. His sister, Jaswant Kaur, married Maharaja Bhupinder Singh of Patiala. Rarewala studied in Patiala and graduated from Mahindra College in 1924. He joined the judicial service of the princely state of Patiala. Later, he became a High Court judge for Patiala State. He also served as a Revenue Commissioner and Revenue Minister for Patiala state and finally he was the prime minister of Patiala state from 1946 to 1947. His daughter, Nirlep Kaur, was also a politician and served as a Member of Parliament in the Lok Sabha. His son, Gureshwarpreet Singh Rarewala, was a distinguished farmer who won many awards in the field of agriculture, including an award for his poplar plantation. He developed the first farm in the state which had an underground irrigation system. His wife belonged to the royal family of Bhadaur.

== Contributions to Punjabi language ==
Sardar Gian Singh Rarewala played a pivotal role in promoting and institutionalizing the Punjabi language during his administrative and political career. In 1944, while serving as Deputy Commissioner of Patiala and President of the Singh Sabha, he invited Maharaja Yadavindra Singh to a Singh Sabha gathering and urged him to adopt Punjabi as the official language of the state. The Maharaja agreed, and within ten months, Rarewala implemented Punjabi as the medium of instruction in schools, as well as the language of administration and the judiciary alongside English.

As Prime Minister of the Patiala and East Punjab States Union (PEPSU), Rarewala personally kept the Punjabi Department under his charge, reflecting his strong commitment to the language. He presented the PEPSU budgets for 1948–49 and 1949–50 in Punjabi—marking one of the earliest instances of an Indian regional language being used for official budget presentations. Over 600 new administrative and financial terms were coined to support this initiative. Due to printing limitations at the time, the budgets were distributed as cyclostyled copies.

Rarewala also oversaw the development and introduction of Punjabi typewriters and promoted Punjabi stenography for official use. He allocated funds for the production of textbooks and other publications in Punjabi and issued instructions to all government departments to use Punjabi for official communication. These efforts laid a strong foundation for the expanded use of Punjabi in governance and education across the region.

== Political career ==
Rarewala became a representative of Patiala in the Constituent Assembly of India on 28 April 1947. The Patiala and East Punjab States Union (PEPSU) was formed later on 15 July 1948. A caretaker government was formed on 22 August 1948 with Rarewala as its premier. On 13 January 1949 a broad-based ministry was constituted and Rarewala was sworn in as its prime minister. When this ministry was dissolved, Rarewala remained the premier of the caretaker ministry from 18 November 1949 to 23 May 1951.

In 1951, Rarewala was elected to the PEPSU Legislative Assembly from the constituency of Payal as an independent candidate. He became the Chief Minister of the PEPSU on 22 April 1952, heading a United Front ministry. Thus, he became the first non-Congress Chief Minister of any state in independent India. He was in office until 5 March 1953 when the president's rule was imposed and his government was dismissed. He became the president of the Shiromani Gurdwara Prabandhak Committee in 1955. After the merger of the PEPSU with the Punjab state in 1956, he became a member of the Indian National Congress and elected to the Punjab Legislative Assembly in 1957. Rarewala became the Irrigation Minister in the Pratap Singh Kairon Cabinet. He was re-elected to the Punjab Legislative Assembly in 1962 and 1967. In 1967 he was appointed leader of opposition in Punjab assembly.

On 14 December 1968, Rarewala left Congress and joined the Shiromani Akali Dal, likely because of his differences with Morarji Desai. He remained a member until his death. Rarewala died in 1979.
