= Parminder Singh Dhindsa =

Indian politician

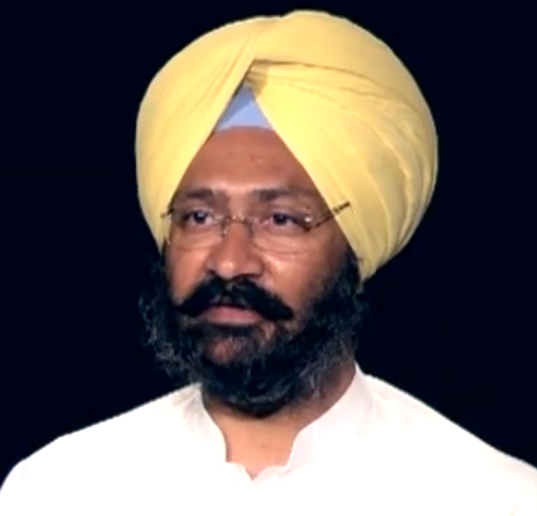

MLA, Punjab
- In office 2017 - 2022
- Preceded by: Rajinder Kaur Bhattal
- Constituency: Lehra
- In office 2000 - 2017
- Preceded by: Bhagwan Das Arora
- Succeeded by: Aman Arora
- Constituency: Sunam

Minister for PWD
- In office 2007 -2012
- Chief Minister: Parkash Singh Badal
- Preceded by: Partap Singh Bajwa
- Succeeded by: Sharanjit Singh Dhillon

Minister for Finance & Planning
- In office 2012 -2017
- Chief Minister: Parkash Singh Badal
- Preceded by: Upinderjit Kaur
- Succeeded by: Manpreet Singh Badal

Personal details
- Born: 7 December 1973 (age 52) Sangrur
- Party: Shiromani Akali Dal (Punar Surjit)
- Other political affiliations: Shiromani Akali Dal(Until 2019)
- Spouse: Gagandeep Kaur Dhindsa
- Children: one son, one daughter
- Website: Official website

Parminder Singh Dhindsa Parminder Singh Dhindsa was born on 7 December 1973 in Sangrur, Punjab, in a respected political family. He is the son of senior leader Sukhdev Singh Dhindsa, who had a long and influential role in both Punjab and national politics. Growing up in such an environment, he naturally developed an understanding of public service, leadership, and the challenges faced by ordinary people. He completed his Bachelor of Commerce from Government College for Men, Chandigarh, and later earned an MBA from Punjabi University, Patiala. His education in commerce and management helped him develop a practical and professional approach towards governance, especially in handling financial matters and planning development work. His father, Sukhdev Singh Dhindsa, is a veteran leader of Punjab politics who rose through the ranks of the Shiromani Akali Dal and became one of its most senior and respected figures. He served multiple terms as a Member of the Rajya Sabha — in 1998, 2004, 2010 and 2016 — representing Punjab at the national level with dedication. He also served as Union Minister of State for Chemicals & Fertilizers from 2000 to 2004 in the government led by Atal Bihari Vajpayee. A close associate of Parkash Singh Badal, he played a key role in strengthening Akali politics, especially in the Malwa region. In 2020, he took a principled stand and formed Shiromani Akali Dal (Sanyukt) after parting ways with the leadership of Sukhbir Singh Badal. His journey reflects decades of public service, strong leadership, and commitment to Punjab’s political and social landscape.

== Beginning of Political Journey ==
Parminder Singh Dhindsa started his political career in 1998 as General Secretary of the Youth Akali Dal. During this time, he worked closely with young party workers and strengthened his connection with grassroots politics. His ability to connect with people at the ground level helped him build a strong political base. In 2000, he entered electoral politics by contesting the Sunam by-election, where he secured a strong victory. This marked the beginning of a long and successful electoral journey. He continued to win from Sunam in 2002, 2007, and 2012, showing consistent public support and trust in his leadership.

== Role in Infrastructure Development as Public Works Minister (2007–2012) ==
In 2007, when the government was formed under Parkash Singh Badal, Dhindsa was appointed as the Public Works Minister. During his tenure, he focused strongly on development, especially improving road infrastructure across Punjab. He worked towards better connectivity between villages and cities, which made transportation easier for people and helped farmers and businesses. His work in this department was seen as practical and result-oriented, contributing to overall development in the state.

== Managing Punjab’s Finances as Finance Minister (2012–2017) ==
In 2012, he was given the important responsibility of Finance and Planning Minister. At that time, Punjab was facing financial challenges, and managing the state’s economy required careful planning. Dhindsa handled this responsibility with a balanced approach. He ensured that welfare schemes for farmers and poor families continued while also trying to control spending and improve revenue. He also represented Punjab at the national level in discussions related to financial policies, where he focused on protecting the state’s interests. His working style during this time was calm, professional, and focused on practical solutions rather than political showmanship.

== Strong Political Presence in 2017 Elections ==
In the 2017 Punjab Assembly elections, he contested from Lehra instead of his traditional Sunam seat. Despite a strong wave against his party, he managed to win the election by defeating former Chief Minister Rajinder Kaur Bhattal with a large margin. This victory showed his personal strength as a leader and the deep trust people had in him, even during difficult political times.

== Stand for Reform and New Political Path (2020–2022) ==
In 2020, Parminder Singh Dhindsa took a firm stand for reforms within the party. He believed that the party should become more democratic, transparent, and connected to the people. Due to these differences, he was expelled from the party. After this, he worked along with his father to form new political groups like Shiromani Akali Dal (Democratic) and later Shiromani Akali Dal (Sanyukt). His focus during this time remained on bringing honesty, discipline, and strong leadership back into politics.

== 2022 Election and Rebuilding Phase ==
In the 2022 Punjab Assembly elections, Dhindsa contested but was defeated. The election saw major changes in Punjab politics, with new leadership gaining strong support. Despite the loss, this phase became an opportunity for him to reassess and focus on rebuilding a stronger political platform with a clear vision for the future.

== Reform Movement and New Leadership Role (2024–Present) ==
In 2024, he briefly returned to the Shiromani Akali Dal, but differences once again led to his expulsion. Following this, he became a key part of a reform movement known as “Sudhar Lehar.” By 2025, this movement developed into a new political party, Shiromani Akali Dal (Punar Surjeet), led by Giani Harpreet Singh. Dhindsa was given the responsibility of Treasurer, where he plays an important role in managing the party’s finances and organizational structure. A major emotional and political moment in his life came in 2025 with the passing of his father, Sukhdev Singh Dhindsa. This marked the end of a significant political era. After this, Parminder Singh Dhindsa took on the responsibility of carrying forward his father’s legacy, continuing the values of public service, dedication, and commitment to Punjab.

== Role in Current Punjab Politics ==
As of 2026, Dhindsa remains actively involved in Punjab politics. He regularly speaks on important issues like development, governance, and law and order. His approach focuses on constructive criticism and offering solutions rather than just political opposition. He is working towards building a strong, honest, and development-focused political alternative in Punjab.

== Contribution Beyond Politics ==
Apart from politics, Dhindsa has also contributed to sports development. He has been serving as President of the Cycling Federation of India since 2011 and is also associated with international cycling bodies. His involvement shows his interest in promoting youth and sports alongside public service.

== Vision and Leadership Style ==
Parminder Singh Dhindsa is seen as a calm, educated, and practical leader. His vision focuses on development, strong governance, financial discipline, and transparency in politics. He believes in combining traditional values with modern thinking to build a better future for Punjab.
