= Patiala and East Punjab States Union =

Former State of India

Coordinates: 31.45°N 77.60°E

- State of India
- 1948–1956
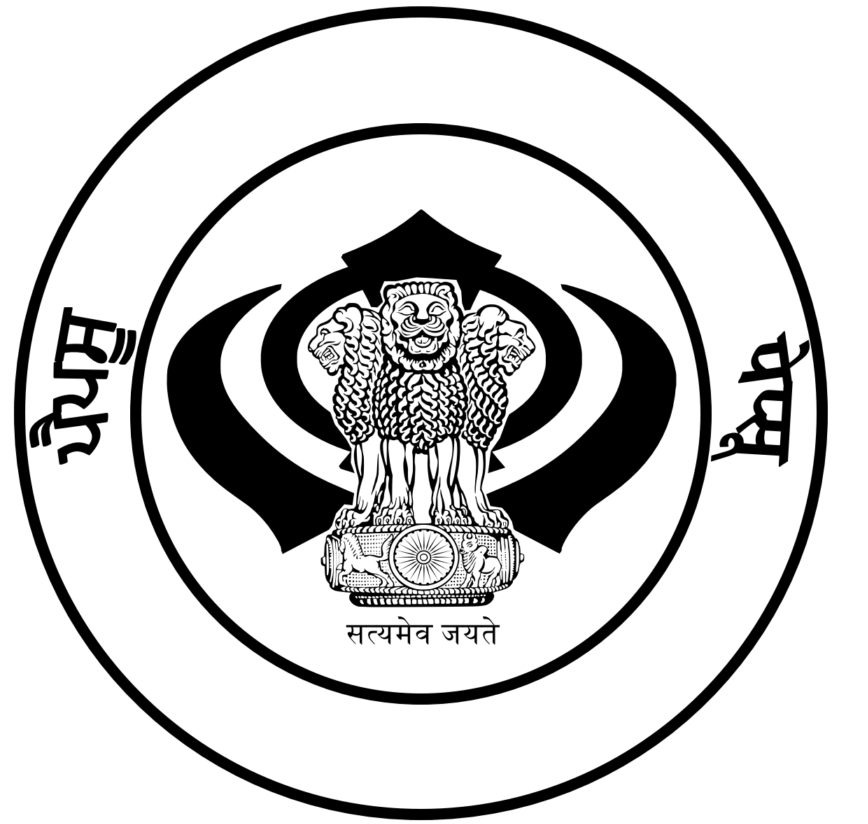
- Emblem

- 1951 map of India. The Patiala and East Punjab States Union is shown forming enclaves in East Punjab.
- Capital: Patiala
- Area
  - 1951: 26,208 km^{2} (10,119 sq mi)
- Population
  - 1951: 3,493,685
  - Type: Democracy
- Legislature: Patiala and East Punjab States Union Legislative Assembly
- History
  - State Established: 15 July 1948
  - State Disestablished: 1 November 1956
Preceded by
Punjab States Agency
Succeeded by
Punjab
Chandigarh
Haryana
Himachal Pradesh
- Today part of: India

The Patiala and East Punjab States Union (PEPSU) was a State of India, uniting eight princely states between 1948 and 1956. The capital and principal city was Patiala. The state covered an area of 26,208 km^{2}. Kasauli, Kandaghat and Chail were also part of the PEPSU.

== History ==
PEPSU was inaugurated on 15 July 1948. It was created by combining eight princely states (7 Punjab States & 1 Punjab Hill State), which maintained their native rulers :

Six salute states:

- Patiala, title Maharaja, Hereditary salute of 17 guns (19-guns local)
- Jind, title Maharaja, Hereditary salute of 13 guns (15-guns personal and local)
- Kapurthala, title Maharaja, Hereditary salute of 13 guns (15-guns personal and local)
- Nabha, title Maharaja, Hereditary salute of 13 guns (15-guns local):
- Faridkot, title Raja, Hereditary salutes of 11 guns
- Malerkotla, title Nawab, Hereditary salute of 11 guns

Two non-salute states:

- Kalsia, title Raja (till 1916 Sardar)
- Nalagarh, title Raja.

PEPSU formally became a state of India in 1950.

=== Successor states ===
PEPSU state in East Punjab

On 1 November 1956, PEPSU was merged mostly into Punjab State under the States Reorganisation Act.

A part of the former state of PEPSU, including the present day Jind district (Jind & Narwana), area of Pinjore in north Haryana, as well as the Charkhi Dadri, Bawal and Mahendragarh Narnaul in south-west Haryana, presently lie within the state of Haryana, which was separated from Punjab on 1 November 1966. Some other areas that belonged to PEPSU, notably (Kandaghat etc.) Solan and Nalagarh, now lie in the state of Himachal Pradesh.

== Rajpramukh and Uparajpramukh ==
S. no.	Rajpramukh	Portrait	Tenure			Uparajpramukh	Portrait	Appointed by
1	Yadavindra Singh		15 July 1948	1 November 1956	8 years, 109 days	Jagatjit Singh		C. Rajagopalachari

== Chief Ministers ==
Color key

- Indian National Congress (2)
- Independent (1)

Other keys

- ^{d} Died in Office
- ^{pd} Position Dissolved
- ^{R} Resigned
- Acting Chief Minister

No	Portrait	Name (Birth–Death) (Constituency)	Term of office		Time in office	Party (Alliance/ Partner)	Assembly (Election)	Appointed by (Rajpramukh)
No	Portrait	Name (Birth–Death) (Constituency)	Took office	Left office	Time in office	Party (Alliance/ Partner)	Assembly (Election)	Appointed by (Rajpramukh)
Interim Government (1948–1949)
-		Gian Singh Rarewala (1901-1979) ( – ) (Acting)	15 July 1948	13 January 1949	182 days	IND	Interim Government	Yadavindra Singh
Premier (1949-1952)
1		Gian Singh Rarewala (1901-1979) ( – )	13 January 1949	23 May 1951^{[R]}	2 years, 130 days	IND	Not Yet Created	Yadavindra Singh
2		Raghbir Singh (1895-1955) ( – )	23 May 1951	21 April 1952	1 year, 333 days	Indian National Congress	Not Yet Created	Yadavindra Singh
Chief Minister (1952–1956)
1		Raghbir Singh (1895-1955) (Patiala Sadar)	21 April 1952	22 April 1952^{[R]}	1 day	Indian National Congress	1st (1952)	Yadavindra Singh
2		Gian Singh Rarewala (1901-1979) (Amloh)	22 April 1952	5 March 1953	317 days	IND (UDF)	1st (1952)	Yadavindra Singh
(i)		Vacant (Note: President's rule may be imposed when the "government in a state is not able to function as per the Constitution", which often happens because no party or coalition has a majority in the assembly. When President's rule is in force in a state, its council of ministers stands dissolved. The office of chief minister thus lies vacant, and the administration is taken over by the governor, who functions on behalf of the central government. At times, the legislative assembly also stands dissolved.) (President's rule)	5 March 1953	8 March 1954	1 year, 3 days	-		Rajendra Prasad
(1)		Raghbir Singh (1895-1955) (Patiala Sadar)	8 March 1954	12 January 1955^{[d]}	310 days	Indian National Congress	2nd (1954)	Yadavindra Singh
3		Brish Bhan (1908-1988) (Kalayat)	12 January 1955	1 November 1956^{[pd]}	1 year, 294 days	Indian National Congress	2nd (1954)	Yadavindra Singh

== Institutions ==
Patiala and East Punjab States Union (PEPSU) coat of arms in the inauguration stone of Government Medical College, Patiala

=== Heads of state and government ===
When the state was formed, the then-Maharaja of Patiala, Yadavindra Singh, was appointed its Rajpramukh (equivalent to Governor). He remained in office during the entire length of the state's short existence. The then Maharaja of Kapurthala, Jagatjit Singh, served as Uparajpramukh (lieutenant-governor).

Gian Singh Rarewala was sworn in on 13 January 1949 as the first Chief Minister of PEPSU. Col. Raghbir Singh became the next Chief Minister on 23 May 1951, and Brish Bhan the Deputy Chief Minister.

The state elected a 60-member state legislative assembly on 6 January 1952. The Congress Party won 26 seats and the Akali Dal won 19 seats.

On 22 April 1952, Gian Singh Rarewala again became Chief Minister, this time an elected one. He led a coalition government, called the "United Front", formed by the Akali Dal and various independents. On 5 March 1953 his government was dismissed and President's rule was imposed on the state. In the mid-term poll that followed, the Congress party secured a majority and Raghbir Singh became Chief Minister on 8 March 1954. Upon his death, Brish Bhan became the Chief Minister on 12 January 1955 and remained in office as last incumbent.

== Administration ==
Initially, in 1948, the state was divided into the following 8 districts & 25 sub-districts (tehsils):

1. Patiala - Patiala, Nabha, Rajpura
2. Kapurthala - Kapurthala, Phagwara
3. Bathinda - Bathinda, Mansa, Faridkot
4. Fatehgarh Sahib - Sirhand, Payal, Amloh
5. Barnala - Barnala, Phul, Dhuri, Malerkotla
6. Sangrur - Sangrur, Sunam, Narwana, Jind
7. Kohistan - Kandaghat, Nalagarth, Dera Bassi
8. Mohindergarh - Mohindergarh, Narnaul, Dadri

In 1953, the number of districts in PEPSU was reduced from eight to five. Fatehgarh Sahib and Kohistan districts were dissolved and merged with Patiala district. Amloh and Payal tehsils of Fatehgarh Sahib were merged with Sirhind tehsil, while Dera Bassi tehsil of Kohistan district was merged with Rajpura tehsil. Barnala district was also abolished. It had four tehsils: Phul, Dhuri, Malerkotla, and Barnala. Dhuri, Malerkotla, Barnala, and part of Phul tehsil were transferred to Sangrur district, while the remaining portion of Phul tehsil was merged with Bhatinda district.

There were four Lok Sabha constituencies in this state. Three of them were single-seat constituency: Mohindergarh, Sangrur and Patiala. The Kapurthala-Bhatinda Lok Sabha constituency was a double-seat constituency.

== Demography ==
The state had a population of 3,493,685 (1951 census), of which 19% was urban. The population density was 133/km^{2}. The state had 64 towns and 5,708 villages.
