= Patiala and East Punjab States Union Legislative Assembly =

State-level legislative body

The Patiala and East Punjab States Union Legislative Assembly was the unicameral state-level legislative body of the Patiala and East Punjab States Union in India. Two elections to the assembly were held; one in 1951 and the second one in 1954. The assembly had 60 seats. The assembly used to meet at the Durbar (Court) of Qila Mubarak, the royal fort at Patiala.

In 1951 there were 40 single-member constituencies and 10 double-member constituencies (none of them reserved for Scheduled Castes or Scheduled Tribes). The Indian National Congress won 26 seats in the election. The Akali Dal, with 19 seats, gathered support from independents and the Communist Party of India to form the United Front. The Indian National Congress cabinet resigned on 18 April 1952. Gian Singh Rarewala, of the United Front, formed a cabinet on 22 April 1952. Rarewala resigned on 11 March 1953.

The assembly elected in 1951 had a five-year term, as per the provisions of Article 172(1) of the Constitution of India. The assembly was dissolved by the Indian president Rajendra Prasad on 4 March 1953, under Article 356 of the Constitution. The president declared that new elections would be held as soon as the Delimitation Commission's redesigning of constituencies were completed. The Delimitation Commission order was published on 15 September 1953. The general elections to the Patiala and East Punjab States Legislative Assembly were held in February 1954. In the 1954 election there were 34 unreserved single-member constituencies, 2 single-member constituencies reserved for Scheduled Castes and 12 unreserved double-member constituencies. The Indian National Congress won an absolute majority in the election. Col. Raghbir Singh was elected leader of the Indian National Congress in the assembly on 6 March 1954. The Congress formed a government two days later. Ramsaranchand Mittal was elected speaker and Sardar Chet Singh was elected deputy speaker.

On 31 October 1956, the Patiala and East Punjab States Union Legislative Assembly was merged with the Punjab Legislative Assembly. The members of the Patiala and East Punjab States Union Legislative Assembly became members of the Punjab Legislative Assembly as of 1 November 1956. The Patiala and East Punjab States Union Legislative Assembly members also elected six members to the Punjab Legislative Council.

== Composition ==
Party	1952–1954	1954–1956
Akali Dal	19	
Bharatiya Jan Sangh	2	
Communist Party of India	2	4
Indian National Congress	26	37
Kisan Mazdoor Praja Party	1	
Lal Communist Party	1	
Scheduled Castes Federation	1	
Shiromani Akali Dal (Mann)		10
Shiromani Akali Dal (Raman)		2
Independents	8	7
