= Chhattiana, Punjab =

Chhattiana Chhattiana
- village
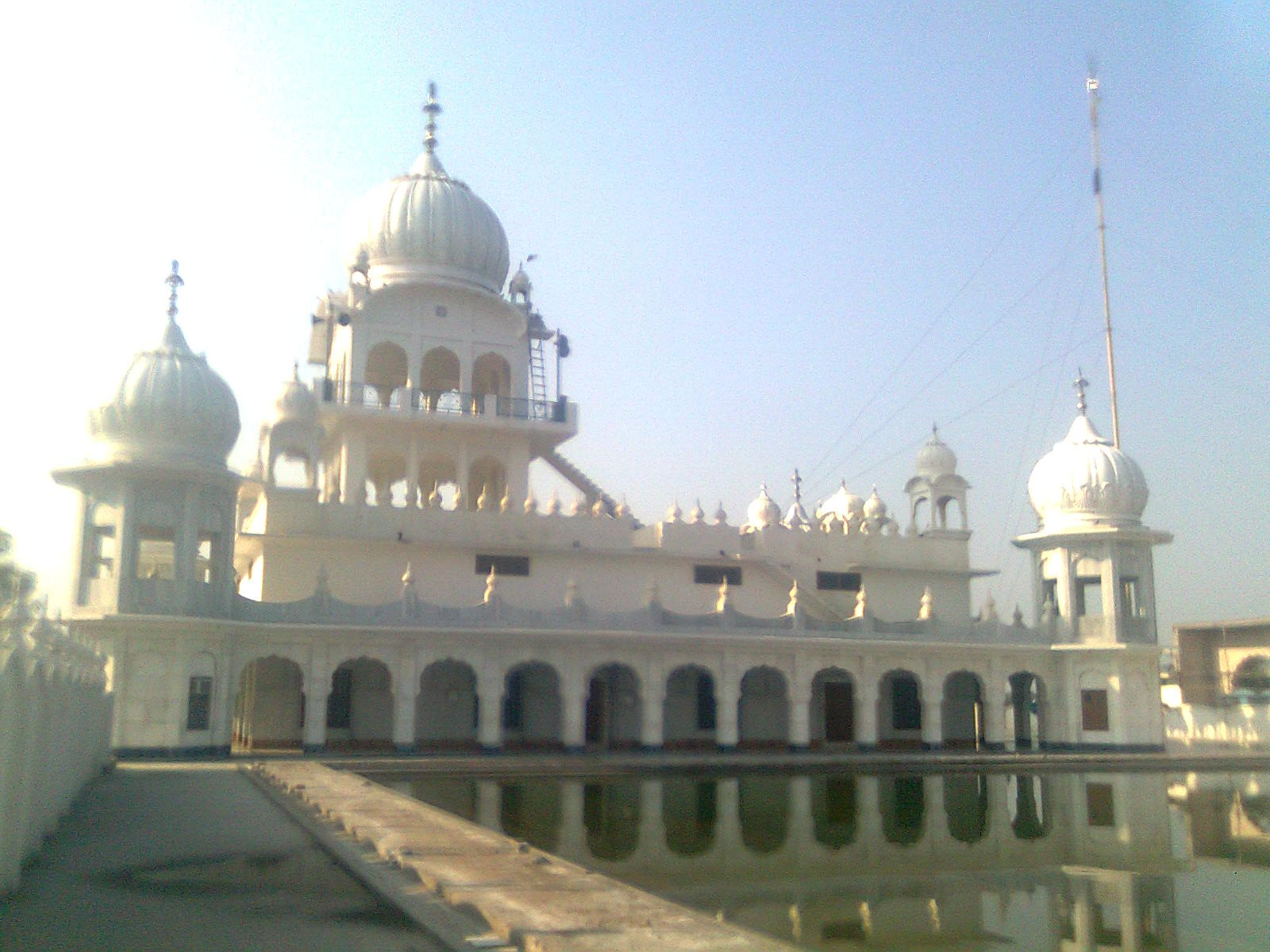
- The Famous Gurudwara, Gurudwara Guptsar Sahib in Chhattiana

- Location in Punjab, India Chhattiana (India)
- Coordinates: 30.3286°N 74.6688°E
- Country: India
- State: Punjab
- District: Sri Muktsar Sahib
- Talukas: Giddarbaha

Government
  - Type: Democratic
  - Body: Aam aadmi party
  - Sarpanch: Kaur singh Brar

Population (2011)
  - Total: 3,815

Languages
  - Official: Punjabi (Gurmukhi)
  - Regional: Punjabi
- Time zone: UTC+5:30 (IST)
- PIN: 152031
- Telephone code: 01637-228***
- Vehicle registration: PB 30
- Nearest city: Giddarbaha
- Sex ratio: 1000/901 ♂/♀
- Avg. winter temperature: 6 °C (43 °F)

Chhattiana is a village in the Giddarbaha tehsil of Sri Muktsar Sahib district in Punjab, India.'

== Economy ==
As is common in the Punjab region, agriculture is the main occupation of the locals and the main source of income. The main crops of the village are, wheat and cotton. Rice growing is started few years ago in the area. As of irrigation, Monsoon greatly affects the agriculture in the region as nearly 70% of the rain falls in July–September by the Monsoon while people use canal (Jaito Rajbaha) and tube wells also.

== Geography ==
Chhattiana is approximately centered at 30°19′43″N 74°40′08″E. It's located in the Sri Muktsar Sahib district of Indian Punjab. The nearest city and railway station, Giddarbaha lies just 15 km in the south-west. The city and district of Bathinda lies to its south-west (32 km) and Sri Muktsar Sahib city to its north-west (22 km). Buttar Sarinh (3 km), Bhalaiana (4 km) and Rukhala (4 km) are the surrounding villages.

Chhattiana is (6 km) from Doda, (30 km) from Bathinda, (27 km) from Jaito and (25 km) from Malout.

Chhattiana known as "Greater Chhattiana" in area.

== History ==
The tenth Sikh Guru, Guru Gobind Singh Sahib came to this place after the Battle of Muktsar (then Khidrane Dee Dhāb, now Sri Muktsar Sahib) in 1705. His soldiers asked Him for their salary as they were not paid for some time. In the meantime, one Sikh presented before the Guru with the Daswandh (1/10th or 10% of one's income) that was the gold coins. The tenth Master started distributing these coins in His soldiers as salary. The soldiers were very happy but one of the Sikh-soldiers, Bhai Daan Singh, refused to take anything. When the Guru asked him that what he wants then, he replied that he wants the Sikhi, the baptism. The Guru pleased with the answer and remarked, "You have saved the honour of the faith for Malwa as Bhai Mahan Singh saved it for Majha". And then Bhai Daan Singh received the rites of the Khalsa.

Peer/Pir Sayyad Ibrahim, popularly known as Peer Brahmi or Vehmi Peer, was a Muslim recluse of the place. He was greatly influenced by the personality of the tenth Master and His Sikhs and requested the Guru to make him a part of the Khalsa. He received the rites of the Khalsa in the hand of Bhai Maan Singh and got the name Ajmer Singh. Later he fought many battles from the Guru's side.

After paying the Sikh-army the Guru buried the extra coins in the ground and named the place as Guptsar. After the Guru the villagers tried to get the coins but nothing found. Today, a beautiful Gurudwara Sahib, known as Gurudwara Guptsar Sahib, located outside (2 km) of the village, marks the site (see picture above).

== Demographics ==
In 2001, as of census, the village had the total population of 3,556 with 619 households, 1,870 males and 1,686 females. Thus males constitutes 53% and females 47% of the population with the sex ratio of 901 females per thousand males.
