= Aasa Buttar =

Assa Buttar Assa Buttar
- village
- Location in Punjab, India Assa Buttar (India)
- Coordinates: 30°26′30″N 74°39′57″E
- Country: India
- State: Punjab
- Region: Punjab
- District: Sri Muktsar Sahib
- Talukas: Giddarbaha
- Elevation: 185 m (607 ft)

Population (2001)
  - Total: 2,692

Languages
  - Official: Punjabi (Gurmukhi)
  - Regional: Punjabi
- Time zone: UTC+5:30 (IST)
- PIN: 152025
- Nearest city: Sri Muktsar Sahib
- Sex ratio: 1000/933 ♂/♀

Aasa Buttar is a small village in the Giddarbaha Tehsil of Sri Muktsar Sahib district of Eastern Punjab. The village is dominated by the Jatt people of Buttar clan.

== Demographics ==
According to the 2001 census, the village had a population of 2,692 with 464 households, 1,393 males and 1,299 females. Thus males constitutes 52% and females 48% of total population with the sex ratio of 933 females per thousand males.

== Geography ==
Aasa Buttar is situated at 30°26′30″N 74°39′57″E, only 18 km from the district main city of Sri Muktsar Sahib. Bhuttiwala (3.5 km), Surewala (4 km) and Doda (12.5 km) are the surrounding villages.

== Religion ==
Sikhism is the main faith of the village. All Jatts of the village are Sikhs.

== Economy ==
Being a rural area of Punjab, agriculture is the main source of income for all Jatt people of the village.
