= Hari ke kalan =

Hari ke kalan Bari hari
- Village
- Location in Punjab, India Hari ke kalan (India)
- Coordinates: 30.481152°N 74.704318°E
- Country: India
- State: Punjab
- District: Sri Muktsar Sahib

Government
  - Body: Nagar panchayat
  - Political Leader: Major Singh Brar Sarpanch

Area
  - Total: 2,854 ha (7,050 acres)

Population (2011)
  - Total: 8,024
  - Density: 281.1/km^{2} (728.2/sq mi)

Languages
  - Official: Punjabi
- Time zone: UTC+5:30 (IST)
- Postal code: 152025

Hari Ke Kalan village is located in the Sri Muktsar Sahib district of Punjab, India.Sarpanch of village Pargat Singh Brar.It is situated 22 km away from Sri Muktsar Sahib, which is both district & sub-district headquarters of the village. The total geographical area of the village is 2854 hectares. Hari Ke Kalan has a total population of 8,024 people, out of which the male population is 4,212 while the female population is 3,812. The literacy rate of Hari Ke Kalan village is 51.57% out of which 55.48% of males and 47.25% of females are literate.

Hari Ke Kalan village is administrated by a sarpanch who is the elected representative of the village by the local elections. As per 2019 stats, Hari ke Kalan village comes under Gidderbaha assembly constituency & Faridkot parliamentary constituency. Bariwala is nearest town to Hari ke kalan village for all major economic activities.
