= Buttar Bakhuha =

- village
- Location in Punjab, India Buttar Bakhuha (India)
- Coordinates: 30.438111°N 74.665725°E
- Country: India
- State: Punjab
- Region: Punjab
- District: Sri Muktsar Sahib
- Talukas: Giddarbaha

Population (2001)
  - Total: 1,985

Languages
  - Official: Punjabi (Gurmukhi)
  - Regional: Punjabi
- Time zone: UTC+5:30 (IST)
- PIN: 152101
- Telephone code: 01637
- Vehicle registration: PB30
- Nearest city: Giddarbaha
- Sex ratio: 1000/912 ♂/♀

Buttar Bakhuha is a small village in the Giddarbaha tehsil of Sri Muktsar Sahib district in Punjab, India. The village is predominated by the Jatts of Buttar clan.

== Geography ==
The village is 7 km away from the Giddarbaha city and 265 km from the state capital city of Chandigarh. Husnar (4.5 km), Madhir (4.5 km) and Kot Bhai (4.5 km) are the surrounding villages.

== Demographics ==
At the 2001 census, the village had a total population of 1,985 with 332 households, 1,038 males and 947 females. Thus males constituted 52% and females 48% of the population with the sex ratio of 912 females per thousand males.

== Culture ==
The village is predominated by the Jatts of Buttar community/clan. The population mainly follows the Sikh faith.

Punjabi is the mother tongue as well as the official language of the village.
