= Kauni, Sri Muktsar Sahib =

Kaoni
- Village
- Location in Punjab, India Kaoni (India)
- Coordinates: 30.400°N 74.663°E
- Country: India
- State: Punjab
- Region: Punjab
- District: Sri Muktsar Sahib
- Talukas: Giddarbaha

Government
  - Type: Gram Panchayat
- Time zone: UTC+5:30 (IST)
- Telephone code: 01633
- Vehicle registration: PB-30, PB-60
- Nearest city: Bathinda
- Sex ratio: 1000/861 ♂/♀

Kaoni is a village in the Sri Muktsar Sahib district of Punjab, India. Its located 18km to east of Muktsar and 28km to North of Gidderbaha town.

Kaoni comes under the Gidderbaha Legislative Assembly (MLA). Its Lok Sabha (Member of Parliament) constituency is Faridkot.
