= Jagroop Singh Gill =

Indian politician

MLA, Punjab Legislative Assembly
- Incumbent
- Assumed office 2022
- Preceded by: Manpreet Singh Badal
- Constituency: Bathinda Urban
- Majority: Aam Aadmi Party

Personal details
- Party: Aam Aadmi Party

Jagroop Singh Gill is an Indian politician and the MLA representing the Bathinda Urban Assembly constituency in the Punjab Legislative Assembly. He is a member of the Aam Aadmi Party. He was elected as the MLA in the 2022 Punjab Legislative Assembly election.

== Career ==
He has served as municipal councillor for seven terms contesting on Congress ticket.

== Member of Legislative Assembly ==
He was elected as the MLA in the 2022 Punjab Legislative Assembly election. He represented the Bathinda Urban Assembly constituency in the Punjab Legislative Assembly. The Aam Aadmi Party gained a strong 79% majority in the sixteenth Punjab Legislative Assembly by winning 92 out of 117 seats in the 2022 Punjab Legislative Assembly election. MP Bhagwant Mann was sworn in as Chief Minister on 16 March 2022.

As an elected MLA Gill was entitled to have security cover and an official government vehicle, an Innova car. When he received a call about these, he declined to take the car or security cover. Gill had stated, "I am against VIP culture. I had written a letter requesting not to provide security, but the local police sent a few security personnel. But I don’t take them along. I will again ask them to take back the security personnel. I am a common man and don't need security". The Tribune reported that Gill is seen moving in his Wagon R car without security detail.

Committee assignments of Punjab Legislative Assembly

- Chairman (2022–23) Committee on Local Bodies

== Electoral performance ==
2022 Punjab Legislative Assembly election: Bathinda Urban
Party	Candidate	Votes	%	±%
AAP	Jagroop Singh Gill	93,057	57.2	
INC	Manpreet Singh Badal	29,476	18.12	
SAD	Sarup Chand Singla	24,183	14.86	
BJP	Raj Kumar	12,761	7.84	New
NOTA	None of the above	1,190	0.73	
Majority		63,581	39.08	
Turnout				
Registered electors		229,525		

State Legislative Assembly
Preceded by Manpreet Singh Badal (INC)	Member of the Punjab Legislative Assembly from Bathinda Urban Assembly constituency 2022 –	Incumbent
