= Manpreet Singh Badal =

Indian politician (Born: 1962)

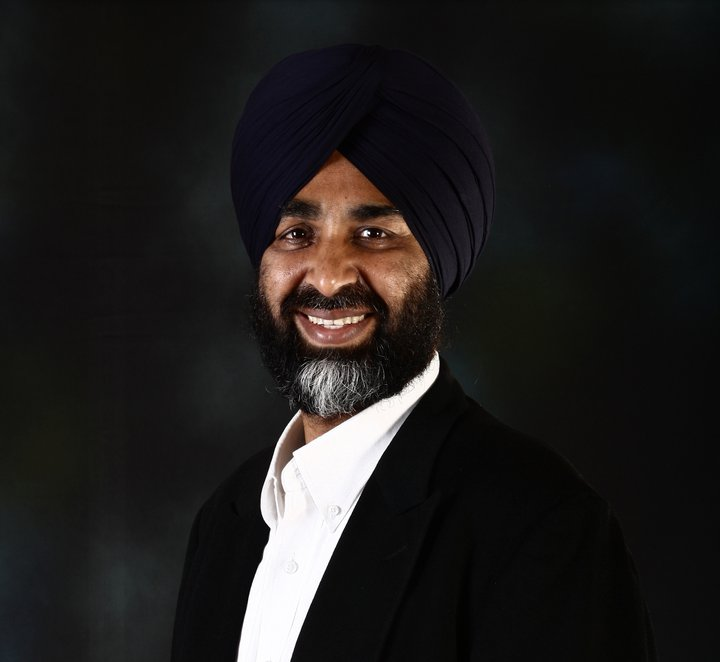

Minister for Finance & Planning Government of Punjab
- In office 16 March 2017 – 10 March 2022
- Chief Minister: Charanjit Singh Channi; Amarinder Singh
- Preceded by: Parminder Singh Dhindsa
- Succeeded by: Harpal Singh Cheema
- In office 2007–2010
- Chief Minister: Parkash Singh Badal
- Deputy Chief Minister: Sukhbir Singh Badal

Member of the Punjab Legislative Assembly
- In office 11 March 2017 – 10 March 2022
- Speaker: Rana K.P. Singh
- Deputy Speaker: Ajaib Singh Bhatti
- Preceded by: Sarup Chand Singla
- Succeeded by: Jagroop Singh Gill
- Constituency: Bathinda Urban
- In office 1995–2012
- Preceded by: Raghubir Singh
- Succeeded by: Amrinder Singh Raja Warring
- Constituency: Gidderbaha

Personal details
- Born: 26 July 1962 (age 64) Badal, Punjab, India
- Party: Bharatiya Janata Party (2023-present)
- Other political affiliations: Peoples Party of Punjab (2010-2016); Shiromani Akali Dal (till 2010); Indian National Congress (2016-2023)
- Spouse: Vinu Badal
- Children: 2
- Parent: Gurdas Singh Badal (father)
- Relatives: Badal family

Manpreet Singh Badal (born 26 July 1962) is an Indian politician from the Bharatiya Janata Party. He is the former Finance Minister of Punjab. He resigned from Indian National Congress on 18 January 2023 and joined the BJP the same day.

He has been member of Punjab Legislative Assembly five times (1995, 1997, 2002, 2007, 2017), and has been finance minister twice. His first stint as Finance Minister was in the government led by his paternal uncle Parkash Singh Badal from 2007 to 2010. This was his second stint as Finance Minister. He has presented the Punjab budget a record nine times — the maximum for any minister in Punjab.

== Early life ==
Manpreet Singh Badal was born on 26 July 1962 in Muktsar. He is the son of Gurdas Singh Badal, the brother of former Punjab Chief Minister Parkash Singh Badal, and Harmandir Kaur Badal, who died on 19 March 2020 at the age of 84. Manpreet Singh Badal attended The Doon School and St. Stephen's College, University of Delhi. He is fluent in English, Punjabi, Hindi, and Urdu. He was subsequently awarded a law degree by the University of London.

== Political career ==
=== Shiromani Akali Dal ===
He was elected to the Punjab Legislative Assembly in May 1995 on an Akali Dal ticket from Gidderbaha. He was re-elected from Gidderbaha constituency in 1997, 2002 and 2007. In 2007 he was made finance minister in Parkash Singh Badal government. He was removed from this post following differences about debt waiver offer from the Centre with the rest of party. Subsequently, he was expelled from the Shiromani Akali Dal (SAD) in October 2010.

=== People's Party of Punjab ===
In 2011, he formed a new political party called People's Party of Punjab. In the 2012 Punjab elections, his party formed political alliance with CPI, CPM and Shiromani Akali Dal (Longowal) with Badal as their candidate for the office of chief minister. He contested the elections from the Gidderbaha and Maur constituencies, losing from both seats.

On 15 January 2016 Manpreet merged his party with the Congress.

=== Indian National Congress ===
After merging his party with the Indian National Congress, he was awarded the party ticket to contest from Bathinda Urban constituency. He won the seat defeating his rival from the Aam Aadmi Party by 18,480 votes in the Punjab assembly elections held in March 2017. In the 2022 elections he lost the seat to Aam Aadmi party by 63,581 votes which is the highest margin lost by any candidate in entire Punjab elections of 2022.[23]. He resigned from Indian National Congress on 18 January 2023.

=== Bharatiya Janata Party ===
After, he quit the Indian National Congress Manpreet Singh Badal joined the Bharatiya Janata Party (BJP) on 19 January 2023. He contested the 2024 bypoll from Gidderbaha on a BJP ticket but lost to AAP candidate Hardeep Singh Dhillon by 59,417 votes.

== Family ==
He is married to Vinu Badal, and he has a son and a daughter. His daughter, Rhea Badal is engaged to Martand Singh of the erstwhile Royal Family of Jammu and Kashmir and the grandson of senior Congress leader Dr. Karan Singh and son of Vikramaditya Singh.
