= Husnar, Punjab =

Husnar Husner
- Village
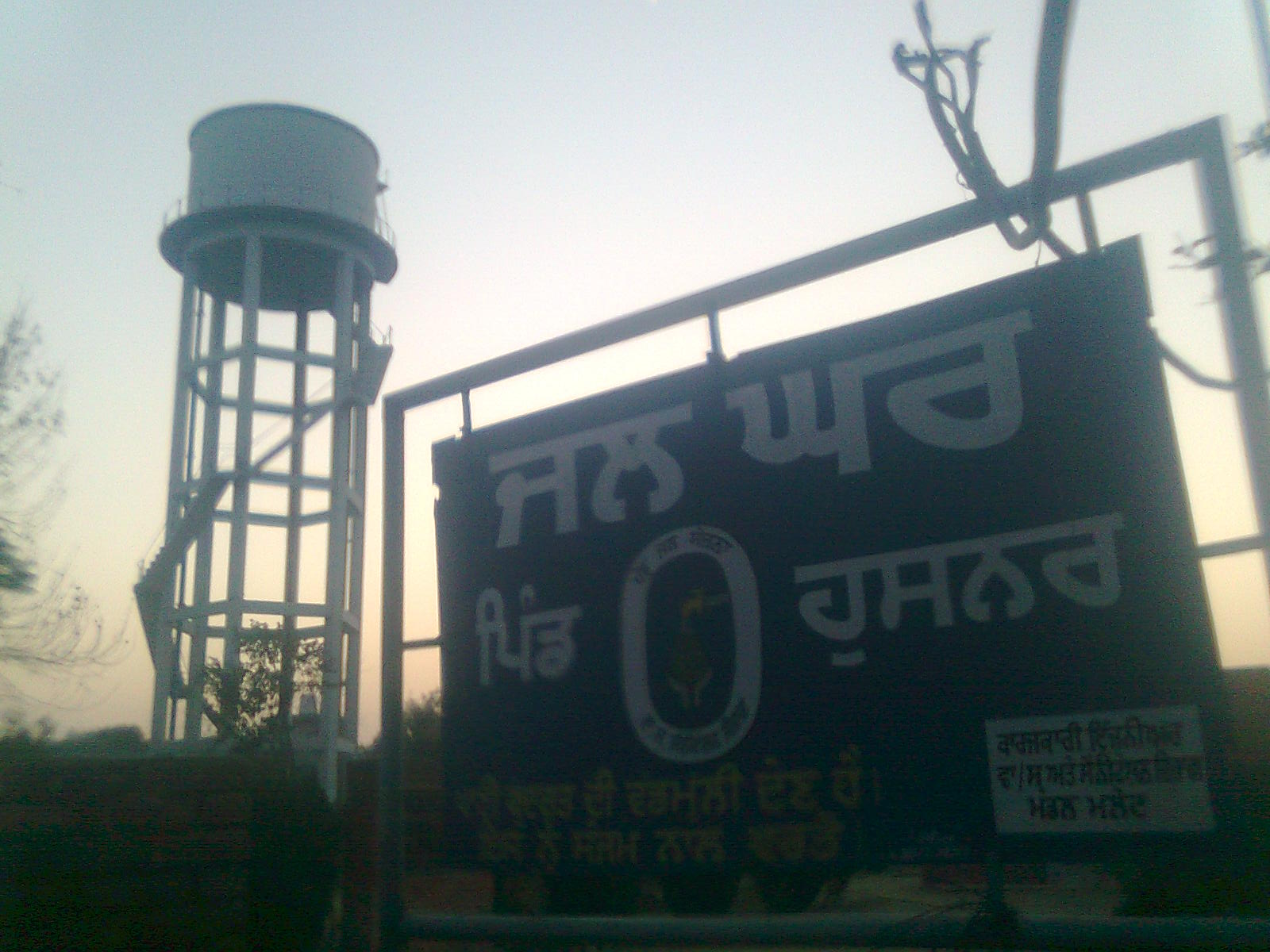
- Water Works of Husnar

- Location in Punjab, India Husnar (India)
- Coordinates: 30.225°N 74.638°E
- Country: India
- State: Punjab
- Region: Punjab
- District: Sri Muktsar Sahib
- Talukas: Giddarbaha
- Elevation: 185 m (607 ft)

Population (2001)
  - Total: 4,845

Languages
  - Official: Punjabi (Gurmukhi)
  - Regional: Punjabi
- Time zone: UTC+5:30 (IST)
- PIN: 152101
- Telephone code: 01637-232***
- Vehicle registration: PB60
- Nearest city: Giddarbaha
- Sex ratio: 1000/919 ♂/♀

Husnar is a village located in the Giddarbaha tehsil of Sri Muktsar Sahib district in Punjab, India.

== Geography ==
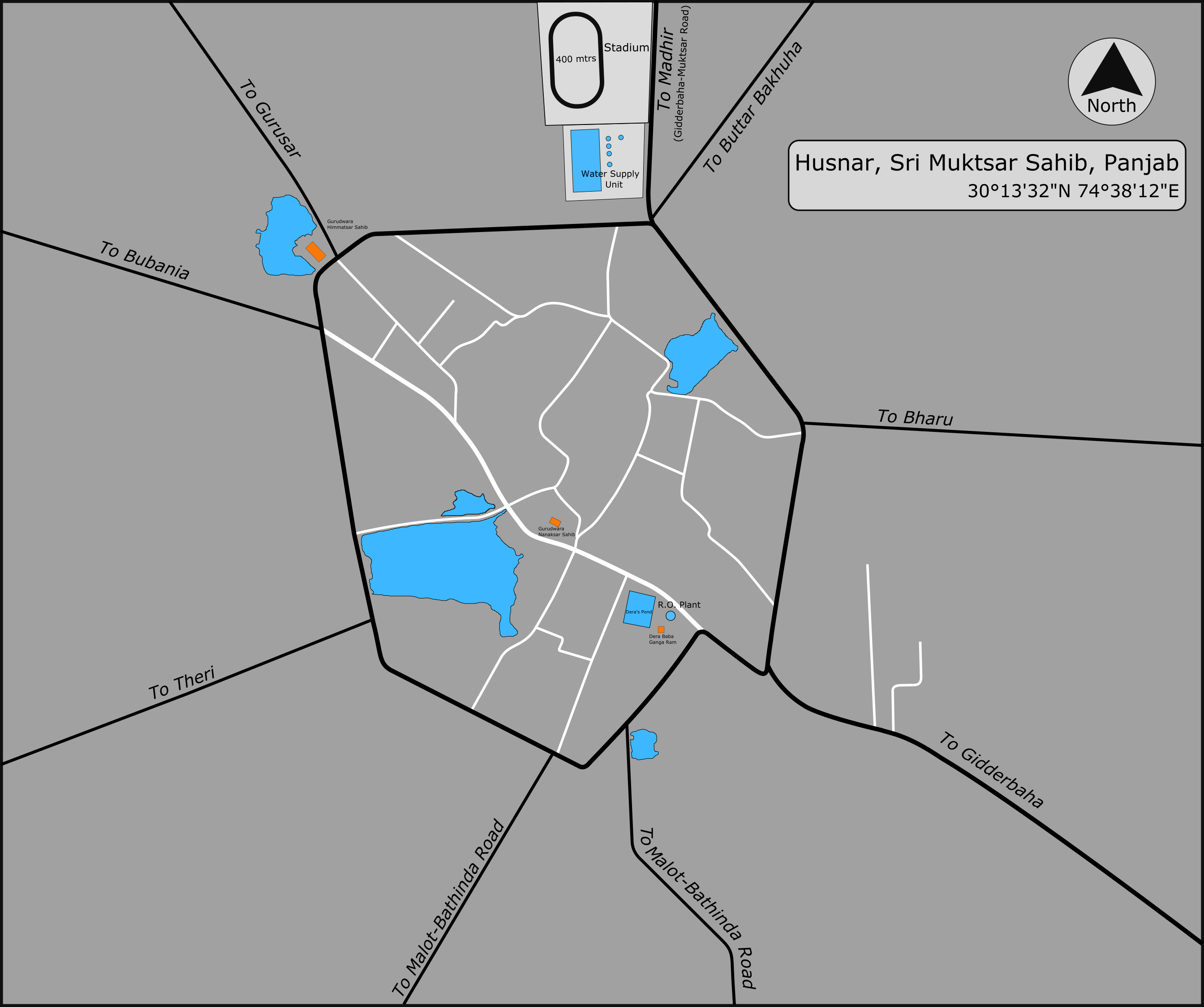
A map of the village

Husnar is approximately centered at 30°13′32″N 74°38′12″E, on the Sri Muktsar Sahib-Giddarbaha road in the Sri Muktsar Sahib district in Indian Punjab, having an average elevation of 185 metres (607 ft). The village is 2 km from the nearest city and railway station, Giddarbaha and 264 km from the state capital city of Chandigarh. Buttar Bakhuha (4.5 km), Madhir (5 km), Bharu (3 km) are the surrounding villages.

== Demographics ==
In 2001, according to the census, the village had the total population of 4,845 with 819 households, including 2,525 males and 2,320 females. Thus, males constitutes 52% and females 48% of the population with the sex ratio of 919 females per thousand males.

== Culture ==
Husnar is predominated by the Jatt people of Brar and Sidhu communities. The other Jatt minorities includes, Gills, Vehniwals and Dhillons. The OBCs are mostly Tarkhans of Khatri community and Ghumiars and the SCs includes Mazhabis and Chamars mainly.

Punjabi is the mother tongue as well as the official language of the village.

=== Religion ===
The villagers are mainly Sikhs, with Hindu minorities. The village have two newly constructed Gurudwaras as the main religious sites.

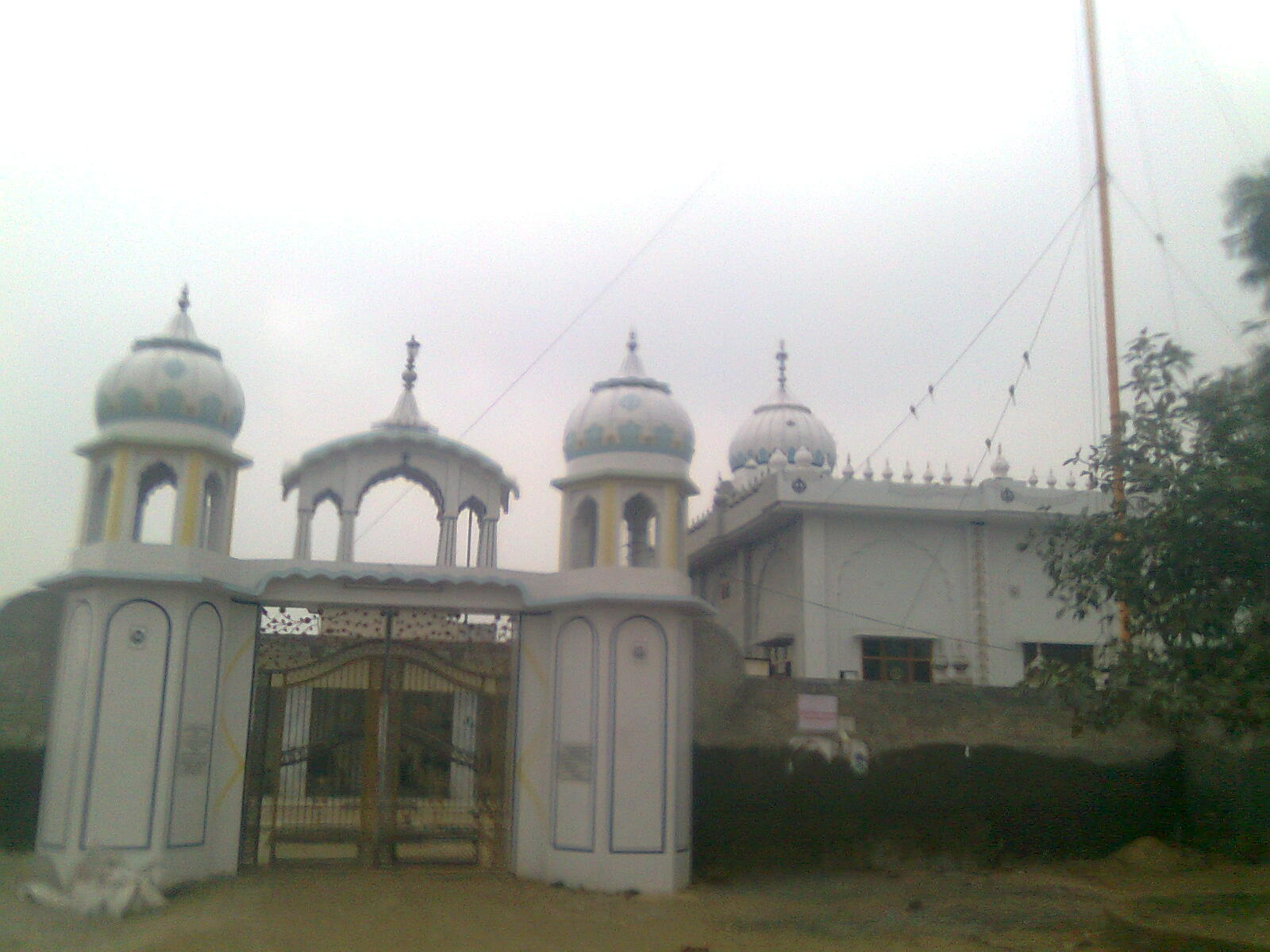
Outer view of Gurudwara Nanaksar Sahib

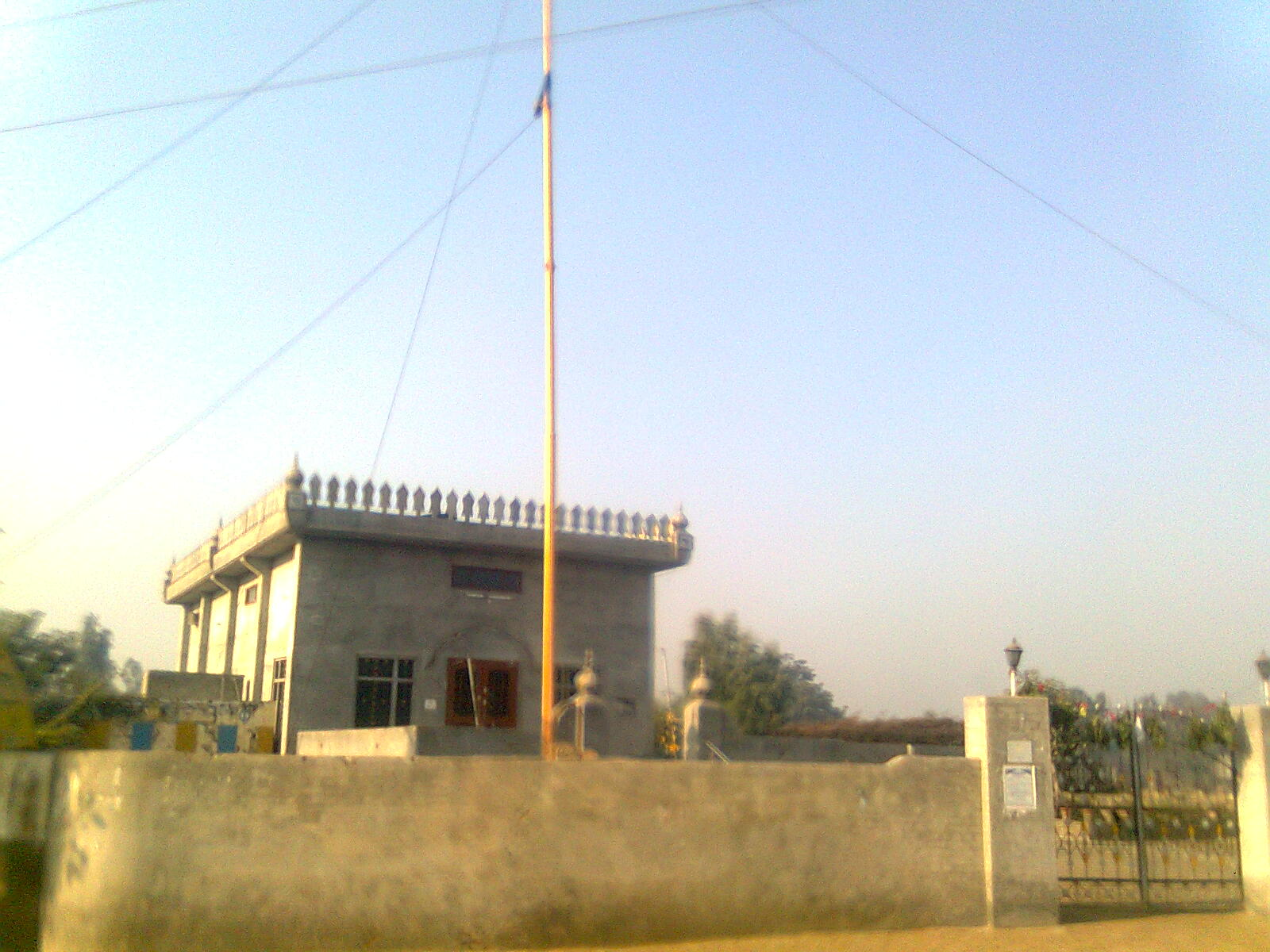
Outer view of Gurudwara Himmatsar Sahib

A Dera, Dera Baba Ganga Ram Ji is also a place of religious respect in the memory of Baba Ganga Ram Ji, an honored Saint of the area. There is a Dera in the memory of the same Saint in the nearest city of Giddarbaha also. People have great respect for Baba Sidh, the main person of the local Gaushala few years ago. A statue of the Saint is located in the Gaushala.

=== Education & Sports ===
The village has a Govt. Primary School (near Gurudwara Nanaksar Sahib), Govt. High School (on Husnar-Giddarbaha road), two Anganwari center and some private schools. The students goes to Giddarbaha, Bathinda and Malout for higher education. Most of the population is educated in this village.

The village have a gaushala (a place for cows), water works, a reverse osmosis plant, and is connected to the surrounding areas with bus services.

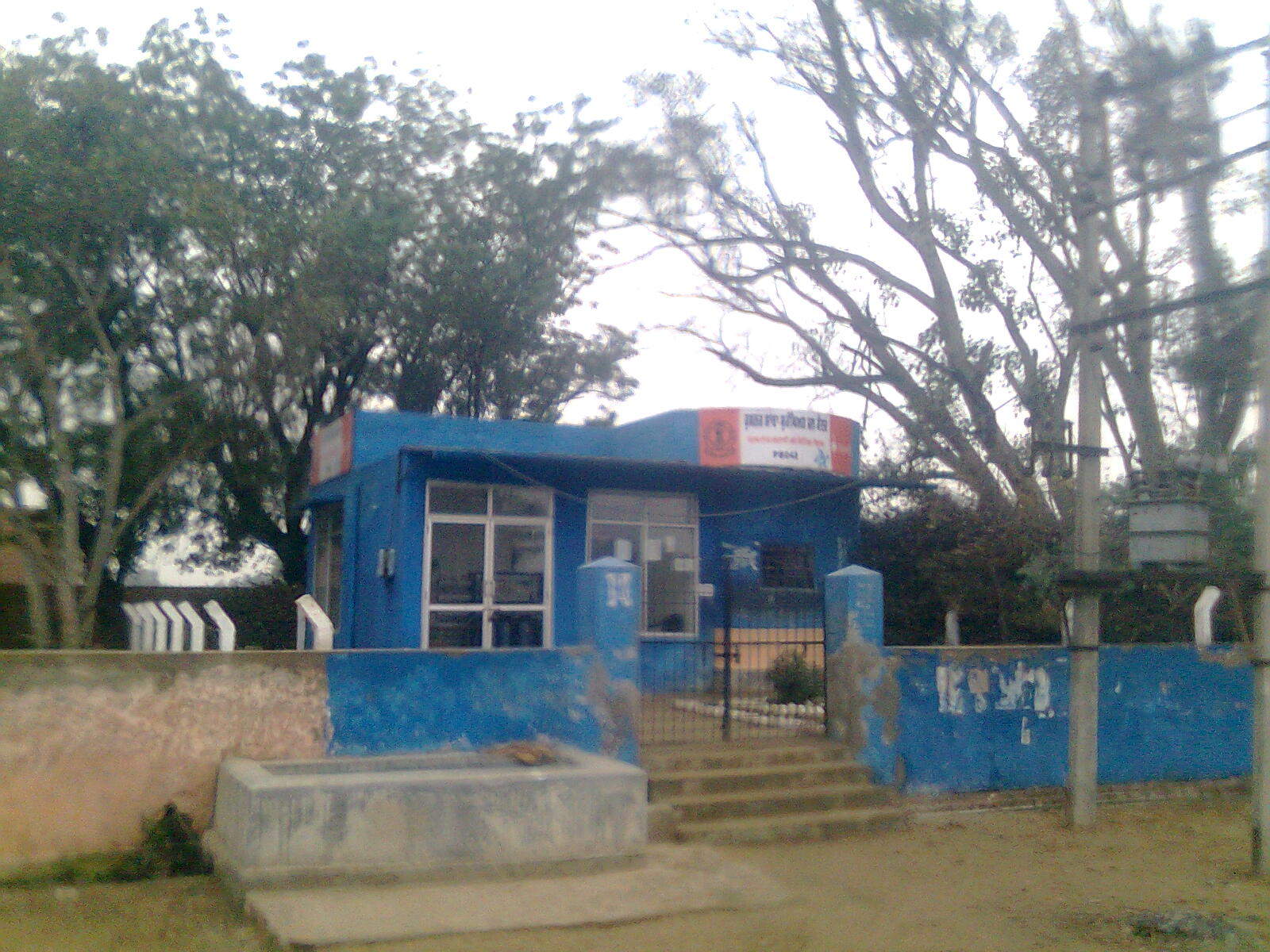
Reverse osmosis plant in Husnar

==== Sports ====
Kabaddi, Cricket and Volleyball are the main games played every evening. There are two sports clubs, and a sports stadium is under construction near the water works.

=== Economy ===
Being a village of Punjab, agriculture is the main occupation of the villagers and the main source of income as well. Wheat, Cotton and Rice are the main crops. A plastic-bottle factory and many rice mills on the outskirts are the main employers.
