= Amrinder Singh (disambiguation) =

Amrinder Singh (born 1993) is an Indian footballer.

Amrinder or Amarinder Singh may also refer to:

- Amarinder Singh (born 1942) is an Indian politician, former chief minister of Punjab, India
- Amrinder Singh Gill (born 1976), known as Amrinder Gill, Punjabi singer-actor
- Amrinder Singh Raja Warring (born 1977), Indian politician, Member of Punjab Legislative Assembly for Gidderbaha
- Amrinder Singh (c. 1980 - 2021), an Indian Punjabi farmer who committed suicide in support of and during the 2020–2021 Indian farmers' protest, Refer to article's Suicides section.
