= Bhalaiana =

Bhalaiana Bhallaiana
- village
- Location in Punjab, India Bhalaiana (India)
- Coordinates: 30.329°N 74.712°E
- Country: India
- State: Punjab
- Region: Punjab
- District: Sri Muktsar Sahib
- Talukas: Giddarbaha
- Elevation: 186 m (610 ft)

Population (2001)
  - Total: 6,550

Languages
  - Official: Punjabi (Gurmukhi)
  - Regional: Punjabi
- Time zone: UTC+5:30 (IST)
- PIN: 152101
- Telephone code: 01637-2*****
- Vehicle registration: PB-60A/Z
- Nearest city: Bathinda
- Sex ratio: 1000/894 ♂/♀

Bhalaiana, sometimes spelled Bhallaiana is a village in the Giddarbaha tehsil of Sri Muktsar Sahib district in Eastern Punjab, India.

== Geography ==
Bhalaiana is situated at 30°19′45″N 74°42′44″E, in the Sri Muktsar Sahib district of Indian Punjab, having an average elevation of 186 metres (610 ft).

== Demographic ==
At the 2001 census, the village had a total population of 6,550 in 1,093 households, of whom 3,459 were males and 3,091 females. Thus males constituted 53% and females 47% of the population with the sex ratio of 894 females per thousand males.

== Economy & others ==
Agriculture is the main occupation of the villagers, some of them have their own general and medical stores.
The village has a branch of the State Bank of Patiala.
