= Badal family =

Sikh political family

The Badal family is a family of Sikh sardars (chiefs) that originated in Badal in the Punjab.

== History ==
After losing in gambling, one Fateh Singh of Ghudda was made to go from his ancestral village to a Dogra-populated village of Badal. Fateh Singh and his son Ranjit Singh were able to acquire considerable landholdings, thus increasing their social status. It was agreed that the farmlands in both Ghudda and Badal would be equally split between the same family. Ranjit Singh of Badal was neutral during the Gurdwara Reform Movement. But his two sons, Raghuraj Singh Badal and Gurraj Singh Badal, would go on to be more active in Sikh politics than their father.

On the 14th of August, 1943, multiple shareholders filed for the first bus transport company in West Malwa, christened “Dabwali Transport Company Ltd.” Owing to a dispute, the company was partitioned and came under the ownership of the Badal family. At first, the company was like a family business— and with such work, the family became quite prosperous. Their success was very apparent to the famed Babu Rajab Ali, who in his early 20th century kavishri noted their success. The family began aligning with the industrialists of the pro-Independence Sikh middle class, despite their presence amongst the common peasantry of the countryside and their familial relations with the landed gentry of the Sikh states, groups that were slower to take up the Independence cause.

Gurraj Singh Badal would join the Shiromani Akali Dal and be involved in various agitations, later becoming elected to serve in the Indian Rajya Sabha from 3 April 1952 to 2 April 1956. Raghuraj Singh Badal would centre his attention towards managing the agricultural holdings while providing his sons and nephews with the best possible education. Parkash Singh would later recall how his formative education began in the nearby village of Lambi which he would reach atop a camel, a testament to the geography and fauna of pre-Green Revolution Malwa. He would go on to study in Sikh National College and graduate from Foreman Christian College, both at Lahore, the Badal family was known as the Firozpurias.

Later Defence Minister Baldev Singh, son of Sir Inder Singh, married his son Surjit Singh to a girl from the extended family of the Badals, further increasing their fortune. The next generation of Badals received even more fortune, from Raghuraj Singh Badal came his two sons Parkash Singh Badal and Gurdas Singh Badal. From Gurraj Singh Badal came Teja Singh Badal. Teja Singh trained the brothers and his son Mahesh Inder Singh Badal in politics and became their mentor. Gurdas Singh Badal, Teja Singh Badal and Mahesh Inder Singh Badal all became MPs, while Parkash Singh Badal became a 5-time Chief Minister. A set of schisms occurred and the family parted ways, first Gurdas Singh and Parkash Singh had a schism with Teja Singh. Then in 2017 Mahesh Inder Singh Badal, Gurdas Singh Badal and Parkash Singh Badal all fought against each other for the Lambi constituency.

The Gurraj Singh Badal side distanced themselves and Hardeep Singh Badal, Surjit Singh Badal and Fateh Singh Badal all left the Shiromani Akali Dal. Later Gurdas Singh Badal and his son Finance Minister Manpreet Singh Badal also distanced themselves from Parkash Singh Badal and his son Sukhbir Singh Badal.

== Notable members ==
- Parkash Singh Badal
- Sukhbir Singh Badal
- Gurdas Singh Badal
- Manpreet Singh Badal
