= Bathinda Urban Assembly constituency =

Legislative Assembly constituency in Punjab State, India

Coordinates: 30.21°N 74.95°E

Bathinda Urban
- Constituency No. 92 for the Punjab Legislative Assembly

Constituency details
- Country: India
- State: Punjab
- District: Bathinda
- Lok Sabha constituency: Bathinda
- Total electors: 229,525 (in 2022)
- Reservation: None

Member of Legislative Assembly
- 16th Punjab Legislative Assembly
- Incumbent Jagroop Singh Gill
- Party: Aam Aadmi Party
- Elected year: 2022

Bathinda Urban Assembly constituency (Sl. No.: 92) is a Punjab Legislative Assembly constituency in Bathinda district, Punjab state, India.

== Members of the Legislative Assembly ==
Most successful parties from Bathinda Urban Vidhan Sabha
1. INC (8 Times) (47.1%)
2. SAD (5 Times) (29.4%)
3. AAP (1 Time) (5.88%)
4. IND (1 Time) (5.88%)
5. JP (1 Time) (5.88%)
6. INC (I) (1 Time) (5.88%)

Year	Member	Party
As part of PEPSU Legislative Assembly (1951–56)
Constituency "Bathinda"
1952	Pritam Singh	Shiromani Akali Dal
1954	Harcharan Singh	Indian National Congress
As part of Punjab Legislative Assembly (1956–Present)
1957	Harbans Lal	Indian National Congress
1962	Harbans Lal	Indian National Congress
1967	Faqir Chand	Independent
1969	Teja Singh	Shiromani Akali Dal
1972	Kesho Ram	Indian National Congress
1977	Hitabilashi	Janata Party
1980	Surinder Kapur	Indian National Congress (Indira)
1985	Kasturi Lal	Shiromani Akali Dal
1992	Surinder Kapur	Indian National Congress
1997	Charanji Lal Garg	Shiromani Akali Dal
2002	Surinder Singla	Indian National Congress
2007	Harminder Singh Jassi	Indian National Congress
Renamed "Bathinda Urban"
2012	Sarup Chand Singla	Shiromani Akali Dal
2017	Manpreet Singh Badal	Indian National Congress
2022	Jagroop Singh Gill	Aam Aadmi Party

== Election results ==
=== 2027 ===
Punjab Assembly election, 2027: Bathinda Urban
Party	Candidate	Votes	%	±%
AAP				
AD (WPD)				New entry
INC				
BSP				
SAD				
BJP				
NOTA	None of the above			
Majority				
Turnout				

=== 2022 ===
2022 Punjab Legislative Assembly election: Bathinda Urban
Party	Candidate	Votes	%	±%
AAP	Jagroop Singh Gill	93,057	57.2	
INC	Manpreet Singh Badal	29,476	18.12	
SAD	Sarup Chand Singla	24,183	14.86	
BJP	Raj Kumar	12,761	7.84	New
NOTA	None of the above	1,190	0.73	
Majority		63,581	39.08	
Turnout				
Registered electors		229,525		

=== 2017 ===
Assembly election, 2017: Bathinda Urban
Party	Candidate	Votes	%	±%
INC	Manpreet Singh Badal	63,942	42.24	
AAP	Deepak Bansal	45,462	30.03	
SAD	Sarup Chand Singla	37,177	24.56	
BSP	Suresh Kumar	913	0.6	
NOTA	None of the above	1,208	0.8	
Majority		18,480	12.30	
Turnout		150,184	73.6	
Registered electors		205,590		

=== Previous Results ===
Year	A C No.	Name	Party	Votes	Runner Up	Party	Votes
2022	92	Jagroop Singh Gill	AAP	93057	Manpreet Badal	INC	29476
2017	92	Manpreet Singh Badal	INC	63942	Deepak Bansal	AAP	45462
2012	92	Sarup Chand Singla	SAD	62546	Harminder Singh Jassi	INC	55901
2007	110	Harminder Singh Jassi	INC	83545	Sarup Chand Singla	SAD	68900
2002	111	Surinder Singla	INC	46451	Charanji Lal Garg	SAD	33038
1997	111	Charanji Lal Garg	SAD	55736	Surinder Kapoor	INC	31355
1992	111	Surinder Kapoor	INC	17192	Joginder Singh	CPI	11312
1985	111	Kasturi Lal	SAD	26676	Dev Raj	INC	24749
1980	111	Surinder Kapoor	INC (I)	29943	Mohinder Singh	CPI	28973
1977	111	Hitabhilashi	JNP	22941	Ram Nath	INC	19523
1972	100	Kesho Ram	INC	22066	Dewan Chand	IND	14764
1969	100	Teja Singh	SAD	14793	Som Chand	INC	13047
1967	100	Faqir Chand	IND	26356	Harban Lal	INC	14921
1962	74	Harbans Lal	INC	24492	Mahesinder Singh	SWA	21612
1957	119	Harbans Lal	INC	16025	Brijinder Singh	IND	15946
