= Bodiwala Kharak Singh =

- Village
- Interactive map of Bodiwala Kharak Singh
- Coordinates: 30.28363654229227°N 74.38786941832525°E
- Country: India
- State: Punjab
- District: Muktsar

Government
  - Body: Gram panchayat

Population (2011)
  - Total: 3,401

Languages
  - Official: Punjabi
- Time zone: UTC+5:30 (IST)
- Postal code: 151210
- Vehicle registration: PB
- Nearest city: Malout

Bodiwala Kharak Singh (Punjabi: ਬੋਦੀਵਾਲਾ ਖੜਕ ਸਿੰਘ) is a village located in Malout tehsil of Sri Mukatsar Sahib district in the Indian state of Punjab.

== Demographics ==
The Village has a population of 3401 of which 1795 are males while 1606 are females as per the census of 2011. Total geographical area of the village is about 1586 hectares or 15.86 km². The postal code of the village is 151210.
