= Bhuttiwala =

Bhuttiwala Bhuttiwala
- village
- Location in Punjab, India
- Coordinates: 30°27′44″N 74°38′47″E
- Country: India
- State: Punjab
- Region: Punjab
- District: Sri Muktsar Sahib
- Talukas: Giddarbaha
- Elevation: 185 m (607 ft)

Population (2011)
  - Total: 3,918

Languages
  - Official: Punjabi (Gurmukhi)
  - Regional: Punjabi
- Time zone: UTC+5:30 (IST)
- PIN: 152025
- Vehicle registration: PB-30 Sri Muktsar Sahib, PB-60 Giddarbaha
- Nearest city: Sri Muktsar Sahib
- Sex ratio: 1000/868♂/♀

Bhuttiwala is a large village located in the Giddarbaha Tehsil of Sri Muktsar Sahib district of Eastern Punjab.
