= Rukhala =

- village
- Location in Punjab, India
- Coordinates: 30.300635°N 74.643576°E
- Country: India
- State: Punjab
- District: Sri Muktsar Sahib
- Elevation: 189 m (620 ft)

Population (2001)
  - Total: 2,030

Languages
  - Official: Punjabi
- Time zone: UTC+5:30 (IST)
- PIN: 152031
- Telephone code: 91-1637-228xxx
- Vehicle registration: PB 60 (GIDDARBAHA) and PB 30 (MUKATSAR)
- Sex ratio: 1000/859 ♂/♀

Rukhala is a village under Giddarbaha Tehsil in Sri Muktsar Sahib district in the Indian state of Punjab (Eastern Punjab).

== Demographics ==
As of 2011 India census, Rukhala had a population of 2,030. Males constitute 53.8% of the population and females 46.2%.

- Number of Males = 1,092
- Number of Females = 938
- Number of Houses = 356

The main occupation of the people here is Agriculture.

== About village ==
The majority of the population is of Jatt community of Sekhon and Sandhu Clan. Sikhism is the main religion and the village people have contributed from their income to construct a beautiful Gurudwara near the old sacred place. Construction of gurudwara sahib is almost complete. Gurudwara sahib has been constructed near the dera of Baba Jamuna Das Ji in the center of the village.
Dera of Baba Jamuna Das ji is situated near Satth of the village. Baba Jamuna Das Ji was sant from Haridwar. Baba ji used to teach all the children of families of Rukhala in his Dera. People of the village used to provide babaji things of necessity.
Samadh of Baba Kala Meher Ji is also located in Rukhala. It is situated at the distance of 0.5 km from the village. Baba Kala Meher Ji is the guru of Sandhu clan. On particular occasions, a gathering ('Mela') is being organised at the samadh by the organizing committee appointed by the head of village (Sarpanch). Residents of this village provide funds to the committee for organising the mela.

== Political involvement ==
Currently the sarpanch of the village is Sardar Gurwinder Singh Sandhu(Kuku) and has been working very hard for the development of the village.

He is assisted by the council of members of Panchayat.

Basic facilities that are available in the village are

- Government Middle School - It serves village students up to Standard 8
- Water works with a Water Purifier Plant
- Village Commonplace - Panchayat Ghar
- Wide roads and streets in village
- Regular bus service connecting near by villages and district headquarter (Mukatsar) and tehsil (Giddarbaha) at regular timings.

In addition to this, the political inclination of people here is mixed one and when it comes to deciding political parties, it is done based on the works done by the incumbent parties.

== Geography ==
It is located in the South Western Zone of Punjab and is bounded by the States of Rajasthan and Haryana in the South. The district of Faridkot lies to its North, Firozepur to the West and Bathinda to the East. There is wide seasonal temperature variation in this area. In summers the temperature reaches as high up as 48-50 °C and in winters as low as 1-2 °C. The Western Himalayas in the north and the Thar Desert in the south and southwest mainly determine the climate conditions. The south-western monsoon brings the much needed rain bearing depression during summer (July to September). Nearly 70% of rainfall is during these months.
