= Hakam Sufi =

- Origin: Giddarbaha, Punjab, India
- Died: September 4, 2012 (aged 60) Sri Muktsar Sahib, Punjab, India
- Genres: Folk
- Occupation: Singer

Hakam Sufi (3 March 1952 – 4 September 2012) was an Indian singer as well as songwriter of Punjabi music. He was known for his songs like, paani vich maaran deetan from a Punjabi film and more. Known for his clean and pure style of music, Hakam Sufi stayed away from vulgarity and bawdy lyrics. Untrapped by commercial interests, Sufi, who worked as a school teacher remained dedicated to pristine pure music till his death.

== Personal life ==
Sufi remained single throughout his life, primarily so that he could dedicate himself to music and to bringing up his siblings. A very close associate of Gurdas Mann, both singers belonged to Gidderbaha in Sri Muktsar Sahib district of Indian Punjab. He started singing at a very early age during his schooldays.

== Songs ==
His major song was the Chhalla, though Sufi himself conceded in a television interview that it was when Gurdas Maan sung the song, that it reached great heights. Pani vich maaran deetan, Mere charkhe di tutt gaee maalh, Kithe laaye ne sajjana dere, Dil vatte di, and Dil tarhpe ashiq da were his major songs.
