= Badal, Punjab =

Badal ਬਾਦਲ
- Village
- Location in Punjab, India Badal (India)
- Coordinates: 30.0761°N 74.6664°E
- Country: India
- State: Punjab
- Region of Punjab: Malwa
- District: Sri Muktsar Sahib
- Tehsil: Malout
- Sub Tehsil: Lambi

Government
  - Type: Panchayat Raj
  - Body: Gram Panchayat

Area
  - Village: 14.95 km^{2} (5.77 sq mi)

Population (2011)
  - Village: 3,473
  - Village density: 232.3/km^{2} (601.7/sq mi)

Languages
  - Official: Punjabi
- Time zone: UTC+5:30 (IST)
- PIN: 152113
- Area code: 01637244
- Vehicle registration: PB 53
- Literacy: 67.49%
- Website: muktsar.nic.in

Badal is a village situated in the Lambi sub-tehsil under tehsil Malout of the Sri Muktsar Sahib district in Punjab, India.

== Geography ==
Village Badal is situated at 59 km South from Sri Muktsar Sahib (District Headquarters), 8 km from Lambi (Sub-division/Tehsil headquarters) and 265 km from Chandigarh (State Capital). It is also 16 km from nearest city gidderbaha & 33 km from Bathinda City and 17 km from Mandi Dabwali, Haryana, India. Village Badal lies mere 17 km North of border with Haryana State of India and 25 km East of Rajasthan State of India.

== Demographics ==
According to the 2011 Census of India, Badal had 686 households comprising a population of 3473, of which 1863 were males and 1610 were females. There were 412 children aged 0–6 and the Average Sex Ratio was 864. The literacy rate was 67.49%, with male literacy standing at 74.52% and that for females being literacy rate was 59.26%.

== Education ==
=== Colleges ===
- State Institute of Nursing and Paramedical Sciences

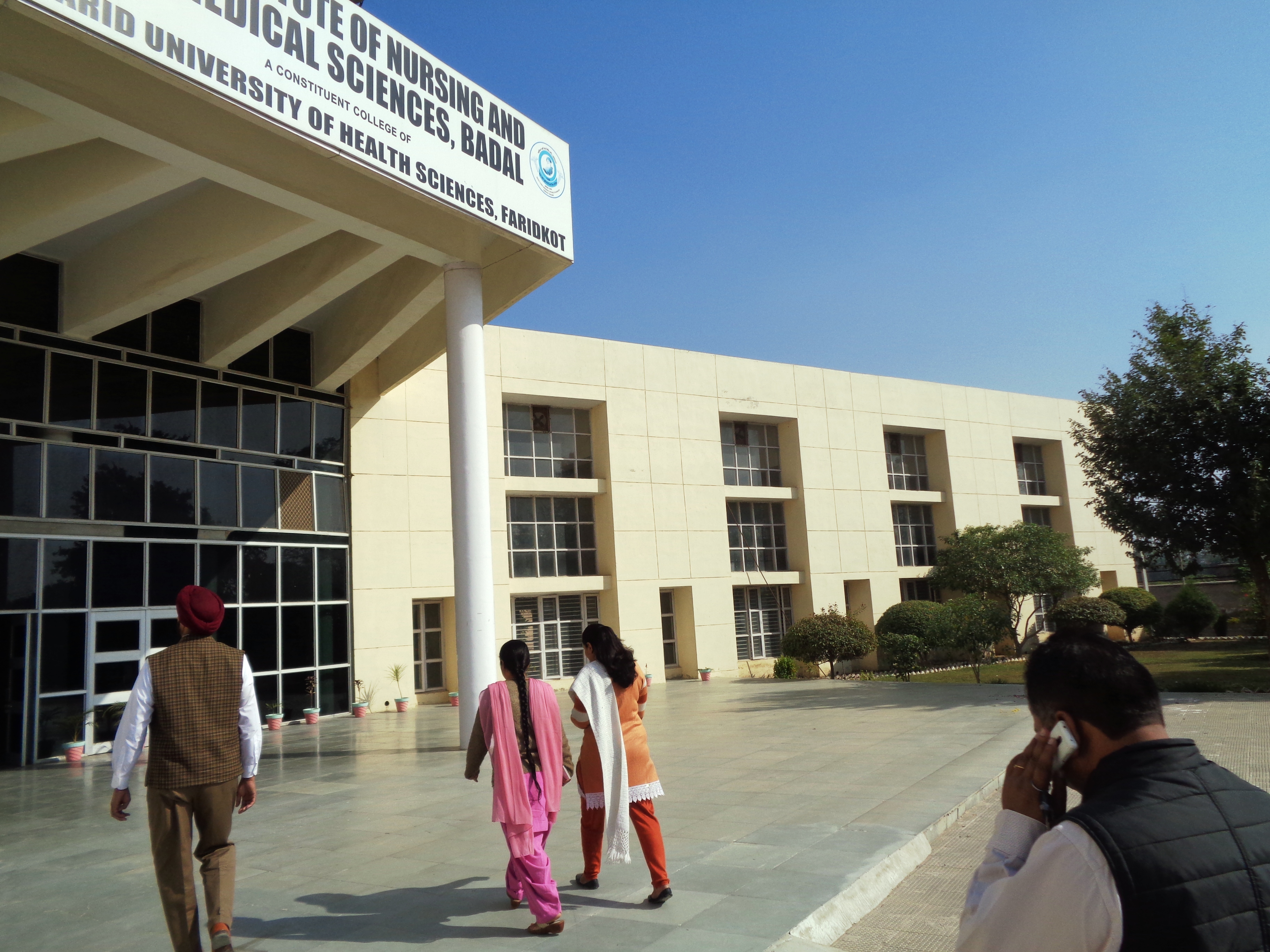
State Institute of Nursing and Paramedical Sciences

- Baba Hira Das Ji Ayurvedic Medical College and Hospital
- Dasmesh Girls College
- Dasmesh Girls College of Education

=== Schools ===
- Mata Jaswant Kaur Memorial School, Badal
- Dasmesh Girls Senior Secondary School, Badal (Only Girls) (Boys up to 5th standard only)
- Government Senior Secondary School, Badal
- Government Primary School, Badal
- Government Primary School, Colony Badal
