= Gurdwara Guptsar Sahib =

Gurdwara in Punjab, India

Gurudwara Guptsar Sahib ਗੁਰਦੁਆਰਾ ਗੁਪਤਸਰ ਸਾਹਿਬ
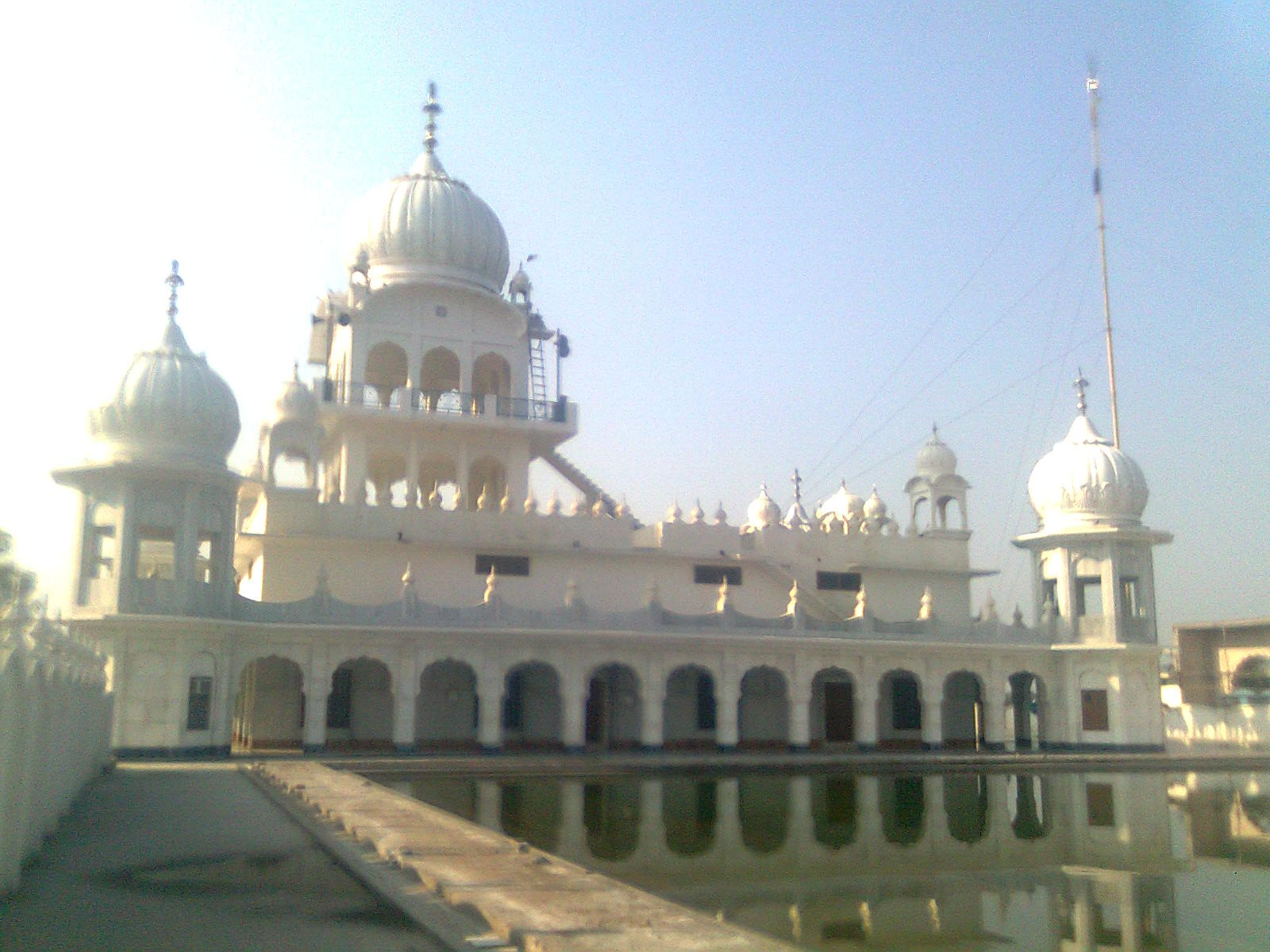
- Gurudwara Guptsar Sahib, a view from the new Sarovar

- Location within Punjab

Religion
- Affiliation: Sikhism
- District: Sri Muktsar Sahib
- Deity: Guru Gobind Singh
- Status: Always open

Location
- Location: Chhattiana, Sri Muktsar Sahib district, East Punjab, India
- Interactive map of Gurudwara Guptsar Sahib ਗੁਰਦੁਆਰਾ ਗੁਪਤਸਰ ਸਾਹਿਬ
- Coordinates: 30.3152°N 74.6812°E

Architecture
- Type: Sikh shrine

Guptsar Sahib (Punjabi: ਗੁਪਤਸਰ ਸਾਹਿਬ) is a holy Gurdwara (English: Sikh shrine) located on the outskirts of Chhattiana village of Sri Muktsar Sahib district in Punjab, India.

== History ==
The tenth Sikh guru, Guru Gobind Singh, visited the place after the Battle of Muktsar in 1705.

=== Peer Sayyad Ibrahim ===
There was a Muslim saint who was a recluse, named Ibrahim, who received the name Ajmer Singh (Punjabi: ਅਜਮੇਰ ਸਿੰਘ) when the tenth master came to this village. The shrine of the Pir/Peer is located at 30.3165°N 74.6755°E near the Gurudwara in northwest direction.

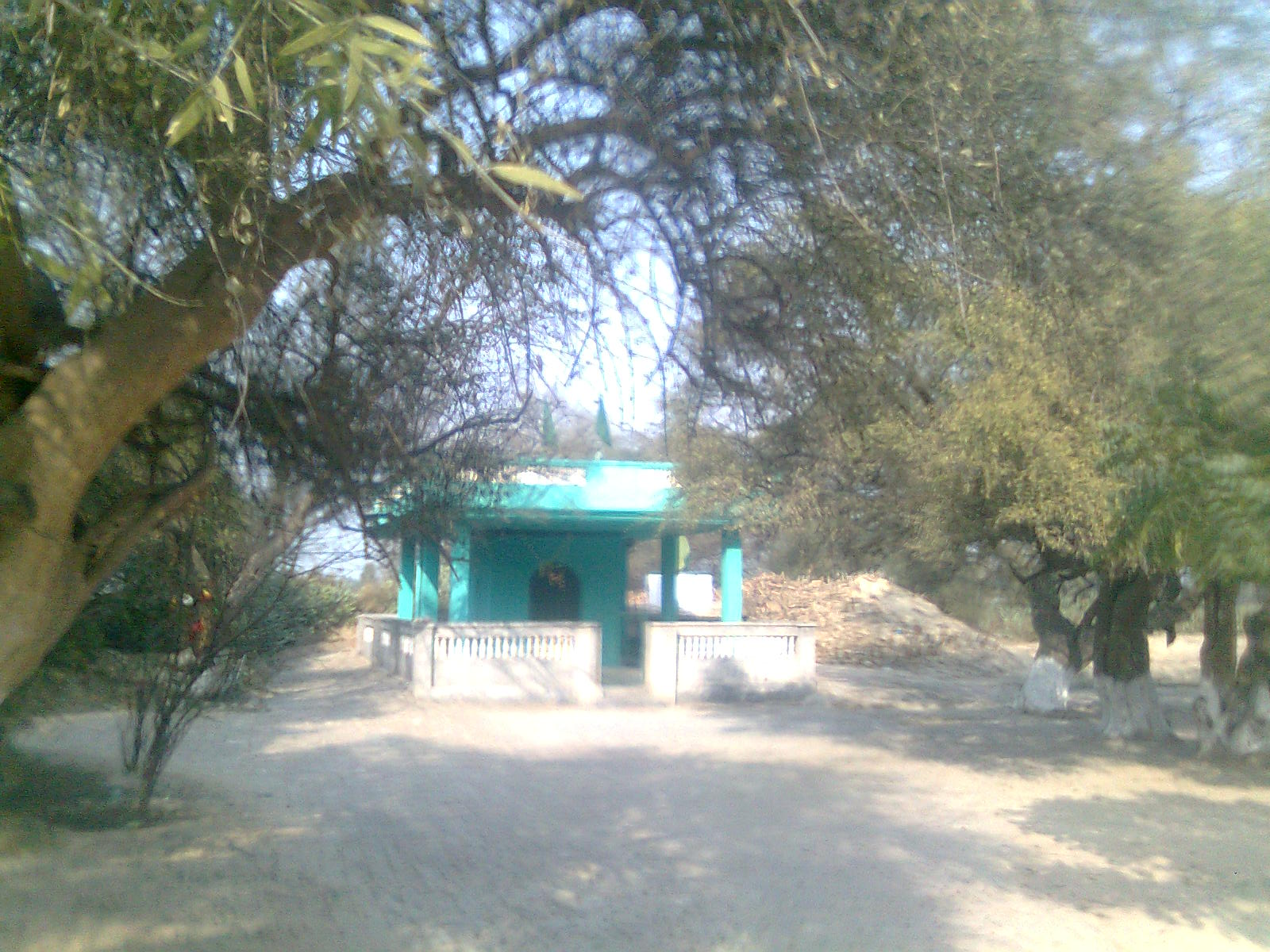
Shrine of Peer Ibrahim (better known as Vehmi Peer)

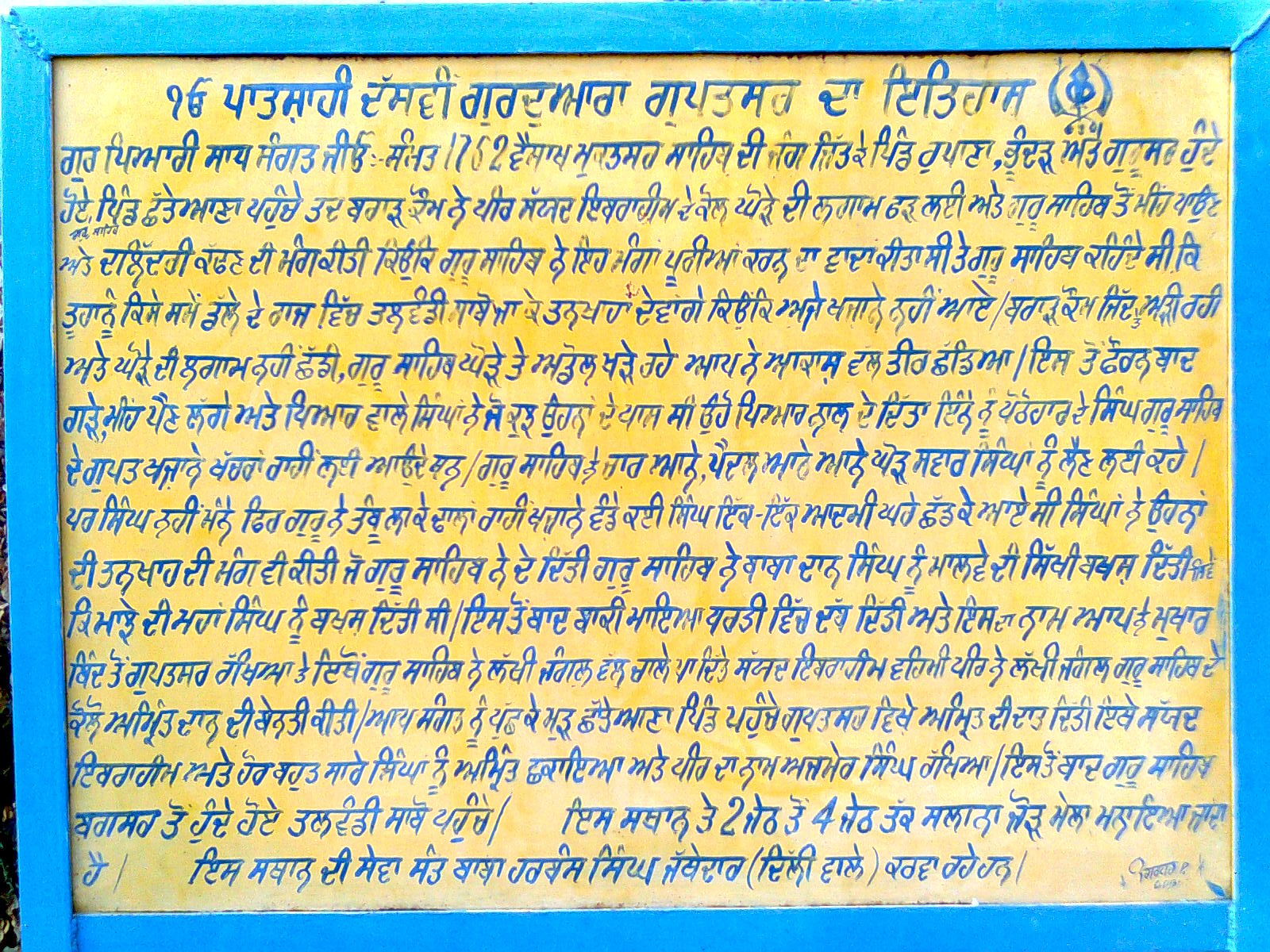
A board at the Gurdwara with the history written on it
