= Bariwala =

Mandi Bariwala
- Town
- Location in Punjab, India Mandi Bariwala (India)
- Coordinates: 30.538127°N 74.652625°E
- Country: India
- State: Punjab
- District: Muktsar

Population (2011)
  - Total: 8,668

Languages
  - Official: Punjabi
- Time zone: UTC+5:30 (IST)
- Postal code: 152025

Bariwala is a town and a nagar panchayat in Muktsar district in the state of Punjab, India and the old name of Bariwala was Baruwali. Amin-ud-din was district collector of Ferozepur that time and he inaugurated the dana mandi in Baruwali. So Grain market carving stone was inaugurated stone that time and still visible on the western Gate of Mandi. Mandi Bariwala is situated on the old Bhatinda - Bhawalpur railway line and in the British rule this town was more important because this is only small market in this area. The name Mandi Bariwala is based on the village Baruwali along with the town.

== Demographics ==
As of 2011 India census, Bariwala had a population of 8668. Males constitute 53% of the population and females 47%. Bariwala has an average literacy rate of 92%, higher than the national average of 74.4%; with 95% of the males and 90% of females literate. 11% of the population is under 6 years of age.

The table below shows the population of different religious groups in Bariwala town, as of 2011 census.

Population by religious groups in Bariwala town, 2011 census
Religion	Total	Female	Male
Sikh	4,682	2,192	2,490
Hindu	3,857	1,800	2,057
Christian	63	31	32
Muslim	55	34	21
Jain	7	5	2
Buddhist	4	2	2
11000	6000	5000	
