= Bhangchari =

Coordinates: 30.384°N 74.469°E

Bhangchari is a village in the Muktsar district of Punjab, India.

== Notable people ==
- Diljeet Brar, a Canadian politician
