= Diljeet Brar =

Canadian politician

Diljeet Brar MLA

Member of the Legislative Assembly of Manitoba for Burrows
- Incumbent
- Assumed office September 10, 2019
- Preceded by: Cindy Lamoureux

Personal details
- Born: Bhangchari, India
- Party: New Democratic Party
- Education: Punjab Agricultural University

Diljeet Brar is a Canadian politician, who was elected to the Legislative Assembly of Manitoba in the 2019 Manitoba general election. He represents the electoral district of Burrows as a member of the Manitoba New Democratic Party.

== Early life and family ==
Diljeet Brar was born in the village of Bhangchari, in Muktsar district, Punjab. Diljeet's father and mother both worked as government school teachers and are retired now. Diljeet and his wife are alumni of Punjab Agricultural University (PAU), Ludhiana, where he also served as an assistant professor. According to his father, as of December 2023, he has visited his native village once in 2020, since moving to Canada in 2010.

== Career ==
A university professor in India prior to his emigration to Canada in 2010, Brar subsequently worked for the provincial government of Manitoba. At the time of his election to the legislature, he was the head of Bulla Arts International, an organization based in Winnipeg which offers educational programs in Punjabi arts and culture.

In 2022, he had introduced a private member bill, according to which April 13 would be celebrated as Turban day across the province, which became Turban day act after passing. In December 2023, he became the first turbaned person to sit at the chair of Manitoba speaker.

== Election results ==
2023 Manitoba general election: Burrows
Party	Candidate	Votes	%	±%	Expenditures
New Democratic	Diljeet Brar	3,032	46.04	+6.35	$20,758.41
Liberal	Garry Alejo	2,074	31.50	+13.19	$7,840.29
Progressive Conservative	Nav Brar	1,479	22.46	-3.66	$6,275.04
Total valid votes/expense limit		6,585	99.43	–	$58,084.00
Total rejected and declined ballots		38	0.57	–	
Turnout		6,623	44.64	-1.43	
Eligible voters		14,835			
New Democratic hold		Swing		–3.42	
Source(s) Source: Elections Manitoba

2019 Manitoba general election: Burrows
Party	Candidate	Votes	%	±%	Expenditures
New Democratic	Diljeet Brar	2,555	39.70	5.8	$22,956.84
Progressive Conservative	Jasmine Brar	1,681	26.12	6.4	$23,945.37
Liberal	Sarb Gill	1,178	18.30	-23.3	$12,836.00
Manitoba Forward	Edda Pangilinan	1,022	15.88	–	$7,024.10
Total valid votes		6,436	–	–	
Rejected		72	–		
Eligible voters / turnout		14,124	46.08	-6.53	
New Democratic gain from Liberal		Swing		+14.6	
Source(s) Source: Manitoba. Chief Electoral Officer (2019). Statement of Votes for the 42nd Provincial General Election, September 10, 2019 (PDF) (Report). Winnipeg: Elections Manitoba. "Candidate Election Returns". Elections Manitoba. Elections Manitoba.
