= Doda, Punjab =

Doda
- town
- Location in Punjab, India Doda (India)
- Coordinates: 30°23′04″N 74°38′22″E
- Country: India
- State: Punjab
- Region: Punjab
- District: Sri Muktsar Sahib
- Elevation: 186 m (610 ft)

Population (2001)
  - Total: 11,529

Languages
  - Official: Punjabi (Gurmukhi)
  - Regional: Punjabi
- Time zone: UTC+5:30 (IST)
- PIN: 152031
- Telephone code: 01637-27****
- Nearest city: Sri Muktsar Sahib
- Sex ratio: 1000/907 ♂/♀

Doda is a village-city in the Sri Muktsar Sahib district of Punjab, India.

== Geography ==
Doda is situated at 30°23′04″N 74°38′22″E, in the Sri Muktsar Sahib district of Indian Punjab, having an average elevation of 186 metres (610 ft). The city and district of Bathinda lies in its east, Sri Muktsar Sahib in north-west and Faridkot district in the north. Doda was a jagir ruled by Randhawa Jats.

== Demographics ==
In 2001, as of census, Doda had a total population of 11,529 with 1,951 households, 6,045 males and 5,484 females. Thus males constitutes nearly 52%, and females 48% of the population with the sex ratio of 907 females per thousand males.

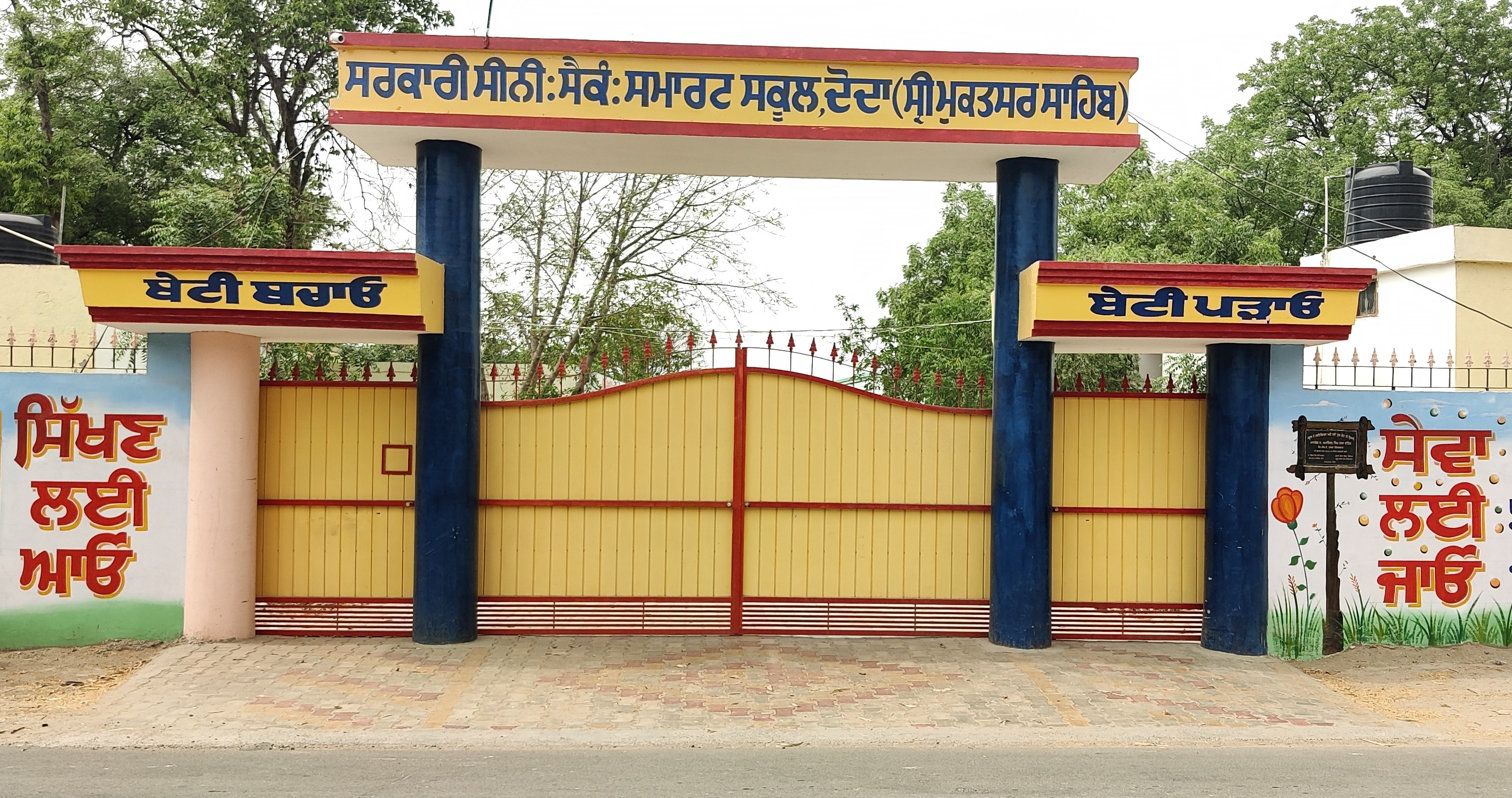
Entrance of Govt. Senior Secondary School Doda (Sri Muktsar Sahib)
