= Sarup Chand Singla =

Indian politician

Chief Parliamentary Secretary
- In office 10 April 2012 – 4 February 2017
- Prime Minister: Narendra Modi
- Constituency: Bathinda(Urban)

Junior Vice President, Shiromani Akali Dal
- Incumbent
- Assumed office July 2014

Personal details
- Born: 13 April 1961 (age 65) Dod, Punjab, India
- Party: Bharatiya Janata Party
- Other political affiliations: Shiromani Akali Dal
- Spouse: Urmila Singla
- Children: Dhinav Singla
- Occupation: Industrialist

Sarup Chand Singla (born 13 April 1961) is an Indian politician and a businessman. He was the Member of Punjab Legislative Assembly from Bathinda Urban Constituency and the Chief Parliamentary Secretary. He Left Akali Dal on 16 March 2022 and joined BJP on 4 June 2022.

== Early life, family and education ==
Sarup Singla was born on 13 April 1961 in village Dod, Punjab, India, to a middle class Hindu family. His father Piyare Lal had six children and Sarup Singla is the youngest amongst all brothers.

Sarup Singla completed his elementary education in a government primary school in village Dod. He then went to government school in BajaKhana but quit the studies before passing his matriculation examinations to join his father's business. He is married to Urmila Singla and they have a son named Dhinav Singla. He currently lives in Aggarwal colony in Bathinda.

== Political career ==
In 1998, a First Information Report was lodged against Sarup Singla in PS Kotwali, Bathinda, Punjab for participating in an agitation against government's decision to levy an excise duty. He was later acquitted by the Hon'ble Court vide order dated 22.10.2008. Active participation in this agitation gained him a lot of support.

In 2007, he joined Shiromani Akali Dal and ran for the office for time from Bathinda Urban constituency but lost the elections. It is widely acknowledged that the political wing of Dera Sacha Sauda was the main reason of his defeat.

In 2012, he again ran for the office from Bathinda Urban constituency and won the elections. On 10 April 2012 he was appointed chief parliamentary secretary. In 2014, he was appointed junior vice-president of Shiromani Akali Dal and was given the responsibility of campaigning along with 39 other party workers during elections of Talwandi Sabo Assembly constituency. Later this year he was also given charge of Traders' wing of Shiromani Akali Dal.

In 2017, he contested again but ended up in the third position after the Congress and AAP candidate respectively. It was also observed that he lost nearly half of his vote bank, due to anti-incumbency. He left Akali Dal on 16 March 2022 and joined Bhartiya Janta Party on 4 June 2022.

== Industrial career ==
Sarup Chand Singla is a notable businessman of Bathinda. His father owned diesel generator manufacturing plant. He is also credited with manufacturing first ISI mark diesel generator in Bathinda district. Before coming to power also he has spent a lot of time in Bathinda development work which is said to be the main reason of his success in elections despite an influence religious figure supporting his opposition.

== Contact details ==
- Facebook : https://www.facebook.com/sarupsingla
- Google+ : https://plus.google.com/101661942848845053493/posts?hl=en-GB
- Twitter : https://twitter.com/SinglaSarup
- YouTube : https://www.youtube.com/channel/UC5cF8Zt-_Q-uHgn8Z9gKHQQ

== See also ==
- Bathinda
- Shiromani Akali Dal
- Bathinda district
