= Amrinder Singh Raja Warring =

Indian politician

Amarinder Singh Brar
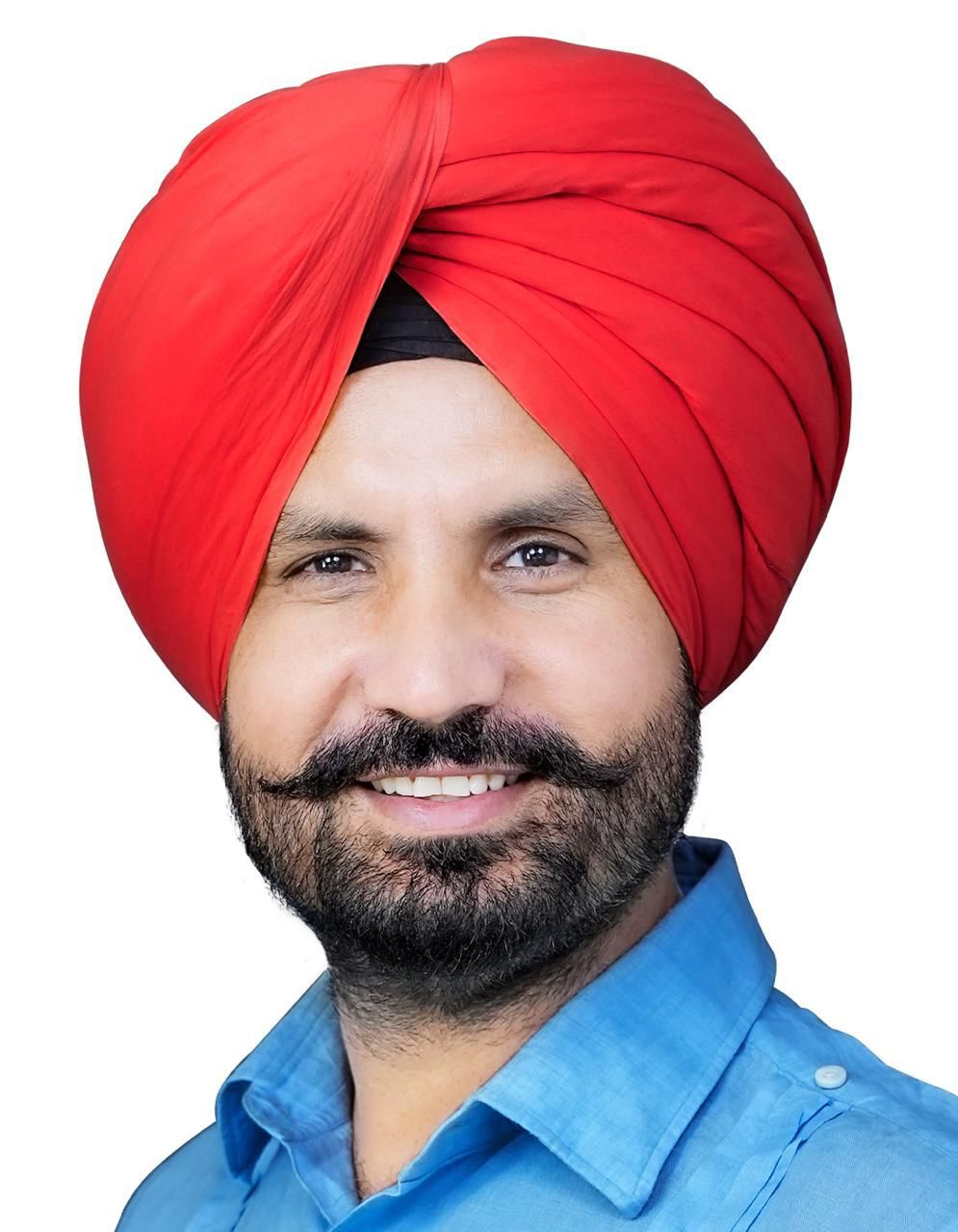

President Punjab Pradesh Congress Committee
- In office 9 April 2022 – 1 October 2026
- Preceded by: Navjot Singh Sidhu
- Succeeded by: Pargat Singh

Member of Parliament, Lok Sabha
- Incumbent
- Assumed office 4 June 2024
- Preceded by: Ravneet Singh Bittu
- Constituency: Ludhiana

Minister of Transport, Punjab
- In office 20 September 2021 – 10 March 2022
- Preceded by: Razia Sultana
- Succeeded by: Laljit Bhullar

Member of the Punjab Legislative Assembly
- In office March 2012 – June 2024
- Preceded by: Manpreet Singh Badal
- Succeeded by: Hardeep Singh Dhillon
- Constituency: Gidderbaha

Personal details
- Born: 29 November 1977 (age 48); Sri Muktsar Sahib, Punjab, India
- Party: Indian National Congress
- Spouse: Amrita Singh
- Children: 2
- Education: Matriculation (PSEB)

Amarinder Singh Brar (born 29 November 1977) also known as Amarinder Singh Raja Warring, or Raja Warring, is an Indian politician and a member of the Indian National Congress. He serves as a Member of Parliament, Lok Sabha representing Ludhiana and as president of the Punjab Pradesh Congress Committee till 2026. Having won three consecutive terms as Member of the Legislative Assembly from Gidderbaha between 2012 and 2024, he is widely regarded as one of Congress's most prominent leaders in Punjab. Born in Malwa, he lost both his parents in childhood and was raised by his maternal uncles, before entering politics through the Indian Youth Congress, of which he served as national president from 2014 to 2018.

== Political career ==
Warring was the president of the Indian Youth Congress, the youth division of Indian National Congress, from December 2014 to May 2018.

=== MLA: First term ===
Warring was elected as a Member of Legislative Assembly from Gidderbaha from 2012–2017, district Sri Muktsar Sahib, Punjab to the Punjab Legislative Assembly.

=== MLA: Second term ===
In March 2017, he was re-elected as an MLA for the second successive time, after completing his first term from 2012–2017. He served as the Transport Minister in the Punjab government.

Warring contested from Bathinda constituency in the 2019 Indian general election against Harsimrat Kaur Badal but lost the elections by over 20,000 votes.

=== MLA: Third term ===
Warring was re-elected for the third cosequtive time as the MLA from the same constituency during the 2022 Punjab Legislative Assembly election. In April 2022, Warring was appointed by the national leadership of Congress as the chief of Congress in Punjab. As PPCC president, Warring led several high-profile campaigns. In March 2025, he led a protest march to the Punjab Vidhan Sabha demanding that the AAP government fulfil its 2022 election promise of providing ₹1,000 monthly financial assistance to all women of the state. The protesters were met with police water cannons and Warring was detained. In April 2026, he announced that Congress would field women candidates on 33 per cent of seats in the 2027 Punjab Assembly elections. Also in April 2026, he filed a Public Interest Litigation in the Punjab and Haryana High Court seeking a ban on the web series Lawrence of Punjab, arguing that it glorified gangster culture.

=== MP: First term ===
In June, Warring won the 2024 Indian general election from Ludhiana Lok Sabha constituency and was elected as a Member of Parliament, Lok Sabha by defeating his nearest competitor, Ravneet Singh Bittu of the Bharatiya Janata Party by a margin of 20,942 votes.

== Family ==
Amrinder Singh Raja Warring was born to Kuldeep Singh and Malkeet Kaur in Sri Muktsar Sahib, Punjab. He lost both of his parents at a young age and was subsequently brought up with the support of his maternal uncles and relatives. His early years were spent in the Malwa region of Punjab, an area with which he has remained closely associated throughout his public and political life. Warring is married to Amrita Warring. The couple have a son and a daughter. Amrita Warring has also been involved in public and political activities in Punjab and later contested the Gidderbaha Assembly by-election as a candidate of the Indian National Congress. According to biographical accounts, Warring was earlier known as "Raja Sotha", with "Sotha" referring to his maternal village. He later began using "Warring", the name associated with his paternal village. The name "Raja Warring" subsequently became the name by which he became widely known in Punjab's political circles.

== Controversies ==
In June 2022, the Shiromani Akali Dal (SAD) sought a Central Bureau of Investigation inquiry into bus-body procurement undertaken during Warring’s tenure as Punjab transport minister. The party alleged, citing information obtained through Right to Information requests, that contracts awarded to a Jaipur-based firm were costlier than locally available alternatives and had caused losses to the state exchequer. The allegations were reported by The Statesman and The Times of India.

In September 2023, media reports said that Punjab’s Vigilance Bureau was examining alleged irregularities connected with Warring’s tenure as transport minister, including matters relating to bus-body procurement and route permits. Separately, Punjab Chief Minister Bhagwant Mann publicly accused Warring of wrongdoing during his tenure.

=== Controversy over remarks toward the Mazhabi Sikh community ===
In November 2025, Punjab Congress president Amarinder Singh Raja Warring faced criticism and legal action over remarks he made about the late Union Home Minister Buta Singh, who belonged to the Mazhabi Sikh community. A complaint was filed by Buta Singh’s son alleging that Warring used terms such as “Kala Mazhabi Sikh” (“Black Mazhabi Sikh”) in a derogatory context during a campaign speech, which the complainant characterised as offensive, casteist, and defamatory toward both the former minister and the broader Scheduled Caste community. An FIR was registered under the Scheduled Castes and Scheduled Tribes (Prevention of Atrocities) Act and other sections of the Indian Penal Code. Warring later issued an unconditional apology for any hurt caused by his remarks. Rival political parties and organisations, including the Shiromani Akali Dal and Aam Aadmi Party, criticised the remarks and demanded action, while the Punjab State Scheduled Castes Commission took notice and sought responses from election officials. Allegations included that the language used could insult and harm the dignity of the Mazhabi Sikh community.

=== Controversy over alleged “neck-twisting” remark ===
During a period of heightened political tension in Punjab, Amrinder Singh Raja Warring, president of the Punjab unit of the Indian National Congress, was accused by political opponents of making a veiled threat against a Dalit minister. The allegation centred on his use of a phrase translated by critics as “twisting his neck” during a public exchange. Opposition parties and some community organisations criticised the remark as inappropriate and potentially intimidating, particularly because it was directed at a minister belonging to a Scheduled Caste community. They argued that such language could be interpreted as threatening and insensitive in the state’s caste-sensitive political environment.

Party political offices
Preceded by Navjot Singh Sidhu	President; Punjab Pradesh Congress Committee; 2022 – 01 Oct 2026	Succeeded by Pargat Singh
