= Gidderbaha Assembly constituency =

Legislative Assembly constituency in Punjab State, India

Coordinates: 30.21°N 74.66°E

Gidderbaha
- Constituency No. 84 for the Punjab Legislative Assembly

Constituency details
- Country: India
- State: Punjab
- District: Sri Muktsar Sahib
- Lok Sabha constituency: Faridkot
- Established: 1967
- Total electors: 167,228 (in 2022)
- Reservation: None

Member of Legislative Assembly
- 16th Punjab Legislative Assembly
- Incumbent Hardeep Singh Dimpy Dhillon
- Party: Aam Aadmi Party
- Elected year: By-Election 2024

Gidderbaha Assembly constituency (Sl. No.: 84) is a Punjab Legislative Assembly constituency in Muktsar district, Punjab state, India.

== Members of the Legislative Assembly ==
Most successful parties from Gidderbaha Vidhan Sabha
1. SAD (9 Times) (60.0%)
2. INC (5 Times) (33.3%)
3. AAP (1 Time) (6.67%)

Year	Name	Image	Party
1967	Harcharan Singh Brar		Indian National Congress"
1969	Parkash Singh Badal		Shiromani Akali Dal
1972	Parkash Singh Badal		Shiromani Akali Dal
1977	Parkash Singh Badal		Shiromani Akali Dal
1980	Parkash Singh Badal		Shiromani Akali Dal
1985	Parkash Singh Badal		Shiromani Akali Dal
1992	Raghubir Singh		Indian National Congress
1995*	Manpreet Singh Badal		Shiromani Akali Dal
1997	Manpreet Singh Badal		Shiromani Akali Dal
2002	Manpreet Singh Badal		Shiromani Akali Dal
2007	Manpreet Singh Badal		Shiromani Akali Dal
2012	Amrinder Singh Raja Warring		Indian National Congress
2017	Amrinder Singh Raja Warring		Indian National Congress
2022	Amrinder Singh Raja Warring		Indian National Congress
2024	Hardeep Singh Dimpy Dhillon		Aam Aadmi Party

== Election results ==
=== 2027 ===
Punjab Assembly election, 2027: Gidderbaha
Party	Candidate	Votes	%	±%
AAP				
AD (WPD)				New entry
INC				
BSP				
SAD	Sukhbir Singh Badal			New entry
BJP				
NOTA	None of the above			
Majority				
Turnout				

=== 2024 by-election ===
Punjab Legislative Assembly by-election 2024: Gidderbaha
Party	Candidate	Votes	%	±%
AAP	Hardeep Singh Dimpy Dhillon	71,644	52.16	▲24.86
INC	Amrita Singh Warring	49,675	36.17	▲0.47
BJP	Manpreet Singh Badal	12,227	8.90	New
NOTA	None of the Above	889	0.65	
Majority		21,969	15.99	
Turnout		137,348	81.90	
AAP gain from INC		Swing		

=== 2022 ===
Punjab Assembly election, 2022: Gidderbaha
Party	Candidate	Votes	%	±%
INC	Amrinder Singh Raja Warring	50,998	35.7	▼9.9
SAD	Hardeep Singh Dimpy Dhillon	49,649	34.8	▲0.8
AAP	Preetpal Sharma	38,881	27.3	▲9.1
NOTA	None of the above	1,088	0.6	
Majority		1,349	0.9	
Turnout		143,765	85.7	
Registered electors		167,761		
INC hold				

=== 2017 ===
Punjab Assembly election, 2017: Gidderbaha
Party	Candidate	Votes	%	±%
INC	Amrinder Singh Raja Warring	63,500	45.6	
SAD	Hardeep Singh Dimpy Dhillon	47,288	34.0	
AAP	Jagdeep Singh	25,334	18.2	
NOTA	None of the above	885	0.6	
Majority		16,212	11.7	
Turnout		138,342	89.0	
Registered electors		156,441		
INC hold				

=== 2012 ===
Punjab Assembly election, 2012: Gidderbaha
Party	Candidate	Votes	%	±%
INC	Amrinder Singh Raja Warring	50,305	40.4	
SAD	Sant Singh Brar	36,653	29.4	
PPoP	Manpreet Singh Badal	31,906	25.6	
BSP	Sheela Rani	1,994	1.6	
Majority		13,652	11.0	
Turnout		1,24,523	88.9	
Registered electors		1,40,131		
INC gain from SAD				

== See also ==
Simranjit Singh Mann

Faridkot Lok Sabha constituency
