= Giddarbaha =

- Town
- Location in Punjab, India Giddarbaha (India)
- Coordinates: 30.20°N 74.67°E
- Country: India
- State: Punjab
- District: Muktsar

Government
  - M.L.A.: Hardeep Singh Dimpy Dhillon
- Elevation: 189 m (620 ft)

Population (2015)
  - Total: 65,370

Languages
  - Official: Punjabi
- Time zone: UTC+5:30 (IST)
- PIN: 152101
- Telephone code: 91-1637
- Vehicle registration: PB-60
- Website: https://web.archive.org/web/20120311185116/http://www.giddarbaha.com/

Giddarbaha is a town and a municipal council in Muktsar district, in the Indian state of Punjab. It is 19 kilometres (12 mi) from the city of Malout, 30 kilometres (19 mi) from the city of Bathinda and 40 kilometres (25 mi) from the city of Muktsar. It lies on NH-7, which connects Fazilka (Punjab) to Mana (Uttarakhand) in India.

== History ==
Giddarbaha in its earliest stage was known as Pepali (Punjabi: ਪਿੱਪਲੀ, romanized: Pippalī) named after an old pipal tree. It was a very happy and small village with limited number of people. According to local tradition, when Shri Guru Gobind Singh ji visited Pepali, he saw ladies of the village disturbed by a jackal (Punjabi: ਗਿੱਦੜ, romanized: giddaṛ) when they went to fetch water from the well. He asked the villagers about this and they told him that everybody in this village was married except the jackal. After knowing the problem, Guruji arranged the marriage of jackal to the pipal tree. From there that village was renamed by the locals to Giddar vyahya (Punjabi: ਗਿੱਦੜ ਵਿਆਹਿਆ, romanized: Giddaṛ viāhiā, lit. 'the jackal is married').

Giddarbaha is relatively more literate than other districts of Punjab and famous for its snuff factories. It took the shape of a town from the small village and when the British reached here they mispronounced the town name as Giddarbaha. They planned a new walled city in 1909 with six gates and carved the name on the gates as Giddarbaha.

In 1917, the British government established the Bathinda - Karachi railway line, to transport the goods from this part of India to Karachi. Giddarbaha Railway Station was established on the line in 1918 which divided the old and new city. The railway station was established near the clock house gate and is very close to the bus stand.

== Geography ==
Giddarbaha is located in the south-western zone of Punjab. The district of Faridkot lies to its North, Firozepur to the West and Bathinda to the East. It is well connected by rail and road networks. National Highway NH-15 connects Giddarbaha to Bathinda. Through Bathinda, Giddarbaha is connected to various Indian cities via railways as well.

== Climate ==
There is wide seasonal temperature variation in the region, with summer temperatures reaching a maximum of 48-50 °C and winter temperatures down to a minimum of 1-2 °C. The western Himalayas in the north and the Thar Desert in the south and southwest mainly determine the climatic conditions. The southwestern monsoon brings the rainy season during summer (July to September), with nearly 70% of the region's annual rainfall occurring during those months. Giddarbaha's sewage system beats the same of some big Indian cities.

The major part of the district experiences an aridic (tropical) moisture regime. It is 19 km away from Malout city.

== Religion ==
The majority of Giddarbaha's population follows Hinduism, followed closely by Sikhism. One can find many mandirs, gurudwaras, mosques, and churches in and around the city. Dera Baba Gangaram, Jai Maa Mahakali Mandir (Railway Road) and Theri village Gurdwara (Giddarbaha) are famous in the region. Gurdwara Guptsar Sahib in Chhattiana village is a famous Sikh gurdwara in Giddarbaha division.

== Demographics ==
Giddarbaha Population Census 2011 - 2022

Giddarbaha is a Municipal Council city in district of Muktsar, Punjab. The Giddarbaha city is divided into 17 wards for which elections are held every five years. The Giddarbaha Municipal Council has population of 45,370 of which 23,847 are males while 21,523 are females as per report released by Census India 2011. The population of children aged 0-6 is 5285 which is 11.65% of total population of Giddarbaha (M Cl). In Giddarbaha Municipal Council, female sex ratio is of 903 against state average of 895. Moreover, child sex ratio in Giddarbaha is around 861, compared to Punjab state average of 846. The literacy rate of Giddarbaha city is 75.15%, lower than state average of 75.84%. In Giddarbaha, male literacy is around 80.70% while the female literacy rate is 69.04%.

Giddarbaha Municipal Council has total administration over 8,892 houses to which it supplies basic amenities like water and sewerage. It is also authorized to build roads within municipal council limits and impose taxes on properties coming under its jurisdiction.

=== Giddarbaha religion data 2011 ===
Town population
Hindu- 64.34%
Sikh- 33.42%
Muslim- 0.70%
Christian- 0.27%
Buddhist- 0.07%
Jain- 0.64%
Others not stated- 0.12%

== Education ==
=== Schools ===
- JNJ DAV Public School
- Govt. Boys School
- Govt. Girls School
- Malwa School
- S. City Montessori School
- DAV Vaish School
- Vardhman school
- MMD DAV College
- Skylight Education classes
- Heritage public sen sec school
- Keshav Vidya Mandir Sen. Sec. School
- Aryan public school
- Bachpan play school
- Sri Guru Gobind Singh College
- Little Angel Public School
- Little Flower Convent School

=== Colleges ===
The town has three degree colleges as well.

- Mata Misri Devi DAV College
- Guru Gobind Singh Girls' College
- Mata Sahib Kaur Nursing Institute
- Government College, Giddarbaha

== Places of interest ==
- Jai Maa mahakali Mandir near railway station
- Gurdwara Dasvin Patshah (Guru Gobind Singh Sahib)
- Gurudwara Nanaksar Sahib (Bantabaad Mohalla])
- Shree Durga Mandir
- Dera Baba Shree Ganga Ram Ji
- Satgur Ravidas Mandir
- Gurudwara Sri Amardass ji (Mandi Wala) Gurudwara Sahib
- Shree Gaushalla Mandir
- Aggarwal Peerkhana
- Hanuman Mandir Bantabad
- Hanuman Mandir Subhash Nagar
- Baba vishvakarma gurudwara
- Freedom Fighter Comrade Chiranji Lal Dhir Municipal Park
- Sh Gurdev Singh Maan Memorial Municipal Park
- Clock House
- City Club
- Basketball Stadium (Baba Ganga Ram Stadium)
- Guru Gobind Singh Bagh
- Biodiversity park Giddarbaha
- Siddhidatri Dham

=== City gates ===
- Clock house gate (main)
- City gate
- Husnar gate
- Bharu gate
- Theri gate
- Daula gate

=== Further afield ===
- Jai Maa Mahakali Mandir, established in 1982 near Giddarbaha Railway Station 0 km (0 mi)
- The Gurudwara Sri Sahib at Theri Sahib, where Sri Guru Gobind Singh is believed to have rested for the night, 5 km (3.1 mi) from Giddarbaha
- The old Dera of Baba Ganga Ram ji, near Husnar village, 3 km (1.9 mi)
- The religious Sarovar of Kulguru, in Husnar village, 2 km (1.2 mi)
- The old church in Daula village, 3 km (1.9 mi)
- Mandi Wali Nehar, 4 km (2.5 mi)
- Dera Baba Lang, 9 km (5.6 mi)
- Badal village, 12 km (7.5 mi)
- Gurdwara Guptsar Sahib in Chhattiana village, 12 km (7.5 mi)

== Economy ==
Giddarbaha is one of the largest producers of snuff and Naswar in India. Several brands of snuff claim to have originated there, including 5 Photo, Six Photo, and 7 Photo snuff. The Six Photo Snuff Factory remains in Giddarbaha.

The city also acts as an agricultural market serving surrounding towns and villages.

== Politics ==
Giddarbaha forms part of the Gidderbaha Assembly constituency (Sl. No. 84) in Sri Muktsar Sahib district. Amarinder Singh Raja Warring of the Indian National Congress won the seat in three consecutive elections in 2012, 2017 and 2022 before vacating it to contest the 2024 Lok Sabha election from Ludhiana, which he won by a margin of 20,942 votes. The current MLA is Hardeep Singh Dimpy Dhillon of the Aam Aadmi Party, who won the November 2024 by-election defeating Congress candidate Amrita Singh Warring by a margin of 21,969 votes.

== Notable people from Giddarbaha ==
Giddarbaha is famous for producing Sardar (leaders) and Kalaakar (singers). Some of them are listed as:

Thekedar Late Lala Deen Dayal Jayaswal Aabkari Thekedar Dob 7 Sept. 1909

- Manpreet Singh Badal, former Finance minister of Punjab
- Parkash Singh Badal, former Chief Minister of Punjab
- Sukhbir Singh Badal, former Deputy Chief minister of Punjab
- Vijay K. Dhir, former Dean of Engineering, University of California, Los Angeles
- Jaani, popular music writer
- Gurdas Mann, popular Punjabi singer
- Ashok Masti, popular Punjabi singer
- Mehar Mittal, popular comedian in Punjabi movies
- Hakam Sufi, Punjabi singer
- Amrinder Singh Raja Warring, President of Pradesh Congress Committee and MP from Ludhiana. Warring represented the Gidderbaha Assembly constituency for three consecutive terms from 2012 to 2024, winning elections in 2012, 2017 and 2022 before being elected to the Lok Sabha from Ludhiana in 2024 by a margin of 20,942 votes.
