= Hardeep Singh Dhillon =

Indian politician

Member of Punjab Legislative Assembly
- Incumbent
- Assumed office 23 November 2024
- Preceded by: Amrinder Singh Raja Warring
- Constituency: Gidderbaha

Personal details
- Party: Aam Aadmi Party
- Other political affiliations: Shiromani Akali Dal (1986-2024)
- Profession: Politician

Hardeep Singh Dhillon, also known as Hardeep Singh Dimpy Dhillon, is an Indian politician from Punjab. He has been a member of the Punjab Legislative Assembly since 2024, representing the constituency of Gidderbaha as a member of the Aam Aadmi Party.

== See also ==
- Punjab Legislative Assembly
