= Sri Muktsar Sahib district =

- District of Punjab
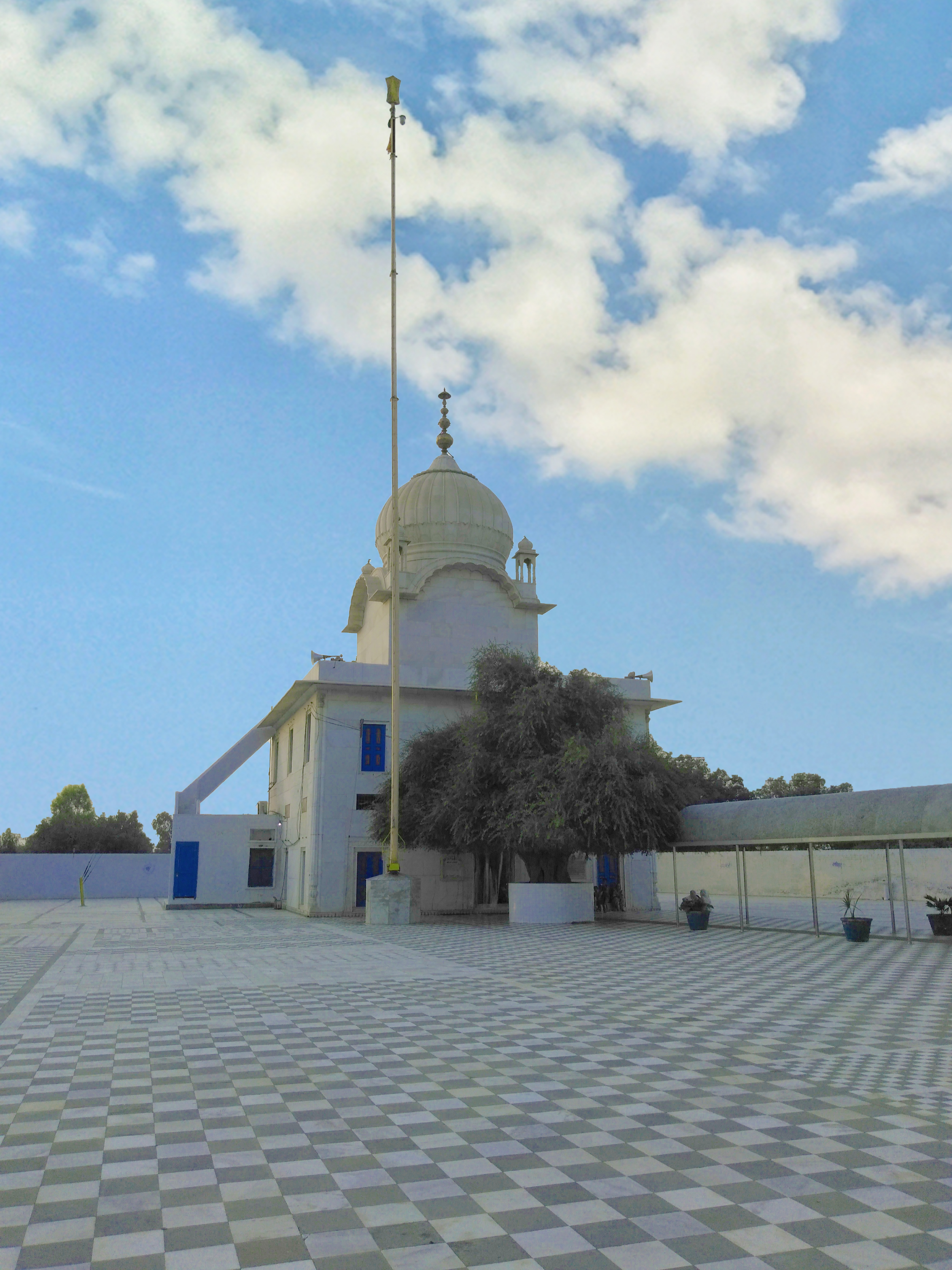
- Gurudwara Tibbi Sahib

- Location in Punjab
- Coordinates: 30.47324°N 74.515412°E
- Country: India
- State: Punjab
- Region of Punjab: Malwa
- Headquarters: Sri Muktsar Sahib
- Talukas: Sri Muktsar Sahib

Area
  - Total: 2,615 km^{2} (1,010 sq mi)
- Elevation: 184 m (604 ft)

Population (2011)
  - Total: 901,896
  - Density: 348/km^{2} (900/sq mi)

Languages
  - Official: Punjabi
- Time zone: UTC+5:30 (IST)
- PIN: 152026
- Telephone code: 01633
- Sex ratio: 1000/891 ♂/♀
- Literacy: 69%
- Website: muktsar.nic.in

Sri Muktsar Sahib district is one of the 23 districts in the Indian state of Punjab. The capital city of district is Sri Muktsar Sahib. The district itself was historically referred to as Khidrane Di Dhaab. There are four tehsils in the district, which consists of a total of 234 villages. The tehsils are Sri Muktsar Sahib, Lambi, Giddarbaha and Malout. The district is part of the Firozpur division.

== History ==
Guru Angad (Nanak II), the Second Guru of the Sikhs, was born in the village Matte-di-Sarai (Sarainaga) in 1504 in the same district.

The last battlefield of the tenth Sikh Guru, Shri Guru Gobind Singh ji, lies in the district's main city. The Battle of Muktsar, a major battle between the Mughals and the Sikhs, occurred in present-day Sri Muktsar Sahib during 1705. The Gurudwara Tibbi Sahib was built to mark the battlefield. They were led by Mai Bhago and Mahan Singh.

The Sri Muktsar Sahib district was formed as a new district on 7 November 1995 by the separation of the Muktsar subdivision from the Faridkot district.

The district has many historical Gurudwaras including the Darbar Sahib - Tuti Gandi Sahib Gurudwara, the Shaheed Ganj Gurudwara, Tibbi Sahib Gurudwara, Datansar Sahib Gurudwara, Rakabsar Sahib Gurudwara in the Sri Muktsar Sahib city, and several others in the district's respective villages.

The Mela Maghi fair is celebrated annually in January in the Sri Muktsar Sahib city in remembrance of the forty martyrs (liberated ones).

The Muktsari jutti is famous throughout the world. The shops making and selling these pieces of art are located around the Gurudwara Sahib in the heart of Sri Muktsar Sahib city. Gidderbaha manufactures naswaar which is supplied throughout India.

== Administration ==
=== Subdistricts of Muktsar district ===
According to the Indian government's integrated online directory, Muktsar district is divided into the following subdistricts (tehsils/subdivisions) and blocks:

- Subdistricts
  1. Gidderbaha
  2. Malout
  3. Sri Muktsar Sahib
- Blocks:
  1. Gidderbaha
  2. Lambi
  3. Malout
  4. Sri Muktsar Sahib

== Demographics ==
Historical population
Year	Pop.	±% p.a.
1951	266,498	—
1961	382,776	+3.69%
1971	430,991	+1.19%
1981	547,394	+2.42%
1991	654,434	+1.80%
2001	777,493	+1.74%
2011	901,896	+1.50%

According to the 2011 census, Sri Muktsar Sahib district has a total population of 901,896, which consists of Gidderbaha 222,937, Malout 348,165 & Sri Muktsar Sahib 330,794 roughly equal to the nation of Fiji or the US state of Delaware. This gives it a ranking of 464th in India (out of a total of 640). The district has a population density of 348 inhabitants per square kilometre (900/sq mi). Its population growth rate over the decade 2001-2011 was 16.1%. It has a sex ratio of 895 females for every 1000 males and a literacy rate of 66.8%. Scheduled Castes made up 42.31% of the population.

=== Gender ===
The table below shows the sex ratio of Muktsar district through decades.

Sex ratio of Muktsar district
Census Year	1951	1961	1971	1981	1991	2001	2011
Sex Ratio	862	846	863	885	880	891	896

The table below shows the child sex ratio of children below the age of 6 years in the rural and urban areas of Muktsar district.

Child sex ratio of children below the age of 6 years in Muktsar district
Year	Urban	Rural
2011	828	832
2001	804	814

=== Religion ===
Religions in Sri Muktsar Sahib district (2011)
Religion	Percent
Sikhism	70.81%
Hinduism	28.26%
Islam	0.48%
Other or not stated	0.45%

The table below shows the population of different religions in absolute numbers in the urban and rural areas of Muktsar district.

Absolute numbers of different religious groups in Muktsar district
Religion	Urban (2011)	Rural (2011)	Urban (2001)	Rural (2001)
Hindu	1,58,174	96,746	1,24,738	71,301
Sikh	90,065	5,48,560	71,494	5,04,737
Muslim	2,043	2,290	1,011	1,632
Christian	776	905	503	900
Other religions	1,133	1,204	818	359

=== Language ===
Languages of Sri Muktsar Sahib district (2011)
1. Punjabi (92.1%)
2. Hindi (6.79%)
3. Others (1.08%)

At the time of the 2011 census, 92.13% of the population spoke Punjabi and 6.79% Hindi as their first language. Bagri is spoken in the south of the district along the Rajasthan and Haryana border.

== Health ==
The table below shows the data from the district nutrition profile of children below the age of 5 years, in Muktsar, as of 2020.

District nutrition profile of children under 5 years of age in Muktsar, 2020
Indicators	Number of children (<5 years)	Percent (2020)	Percent (2016)
Stunted	25,388	35%	32%
Wasted	9,872	14%	16%
Severely wasted	4,679	6%	4%
Underweight	22,283	31%	22%
Overweight/obesity	2,009	3%	4%
Anemia	44,941	69%	64%
Total children	72,537		

The table below shows the district nutrition profile of Muktsar, of women between the ages of 15 and 49 years, as of 2020.

District nutritional profile of Muktsar, of women of 15-49 years, in 2020
Indicators	Number of women (15-49 years)	Percent (2020)	Percent (2016)
Underweight (BMI <18.5 kg/m^2)	52,395	18%	15%
Overweight/obesity	87,495	31%	26%
Hypertension	69,433	24%	21%
Diabetes	38,428	14%	NA
Anemia (non-preg)	173,312	61%	48%
Anemia (preg)	NA	NA	43%
Total women (preg)	14,544		
Total women	284,445		

The table below shows the current use of family planning methods by currently married women between the ages of 15 and 49 years, in Sri Muktsar Sahib district.

Family planning methods used by women between the ages of 15 and 49 years, in Sri Muktsar Sahib district
Method	Total (2019–21)	Total (2015–16)
Female sterilization	31.3%	49.0%
Male sterilization	0.6%	0.5%
IUD/PPIUD	3.0%	12.5%
Pill	1.7%	2.3%
Condom	22.6%	14.6%
Injectables	0.3%	0.3%
Any modern method	59.7%	79.2%
Any method	72.0%	84.8%
Total unmet need	6.2%	1.9%
Unmet need for spacing	2.3%	0.7%

The table below shows the number of road accidents and people affected in Sri Muktsar Sahib district by year.

Road accidents and people affected in Sri Muktsar Sahib district by year
Year	Accidents	Killed	Injured	Vehicles Involved
2022	139	131	79	211
2021	161	130	78	149
2020	142	112	74	172
2019	188	166	97	128

== Economy ==
In 2014-15, there were 2,371 registered Micro and Small Enterprise (MSE) units in Sri Muktsar Sahib district, which provided employment to 8,846 people. There were 4 registered Medium and Large industrial units, which provided employment to 2,064 people.

== Politics ==
No.	Constituency	Name of MLA	Party	Bench
83	Lambi	Gurmeet Singh Khudian	Aam Aadmi Party	Government
84	Gidderbaha	Hardeep Singh Dimpy Dhillon	Aam Aadmi Party	Government
85	Malout (SC)	Dr. Baljit Kaur	Aam Aadmi Party	Government
86	Muktsar	Jagdeep Singh Brar	Aam Aadmi Party	Government

== Notable people ==
- Gurdas Maan, musician and writer
- Deep Sidhu, actor
- Diljeet Brar, Canadian politician
- Gurkeerat Singh, cricketer
- Amrinder Singh Raja Warring, politician, president of Punjab Pradesh Congress Committee
- Parkash Singh Badal, politician, former chief minister of Punjab
- Jagdeep Singh Kaka Brar, politician
- Jaani (songwriter)
- Deepinder Goyal, co-founder of Zomato

== See also ==
- Bhangchari
- Kauni
- Bhuttiwala
- Doda, Punjab
