= 2014 Indian general election in Punjab =

- April–May 2014

13 seats
- Turnout: 70.63% (▲0.85%)
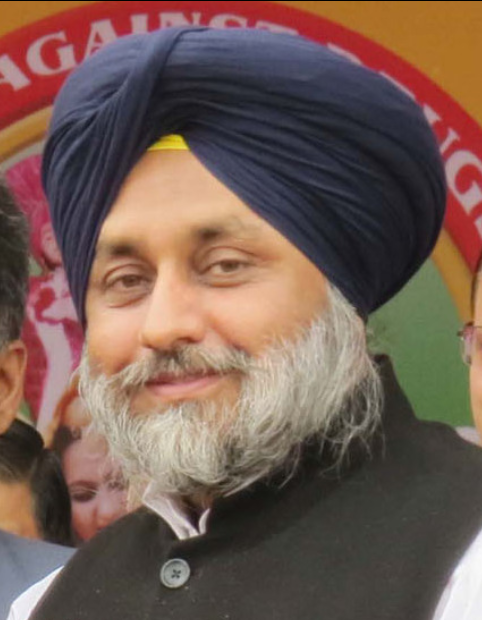

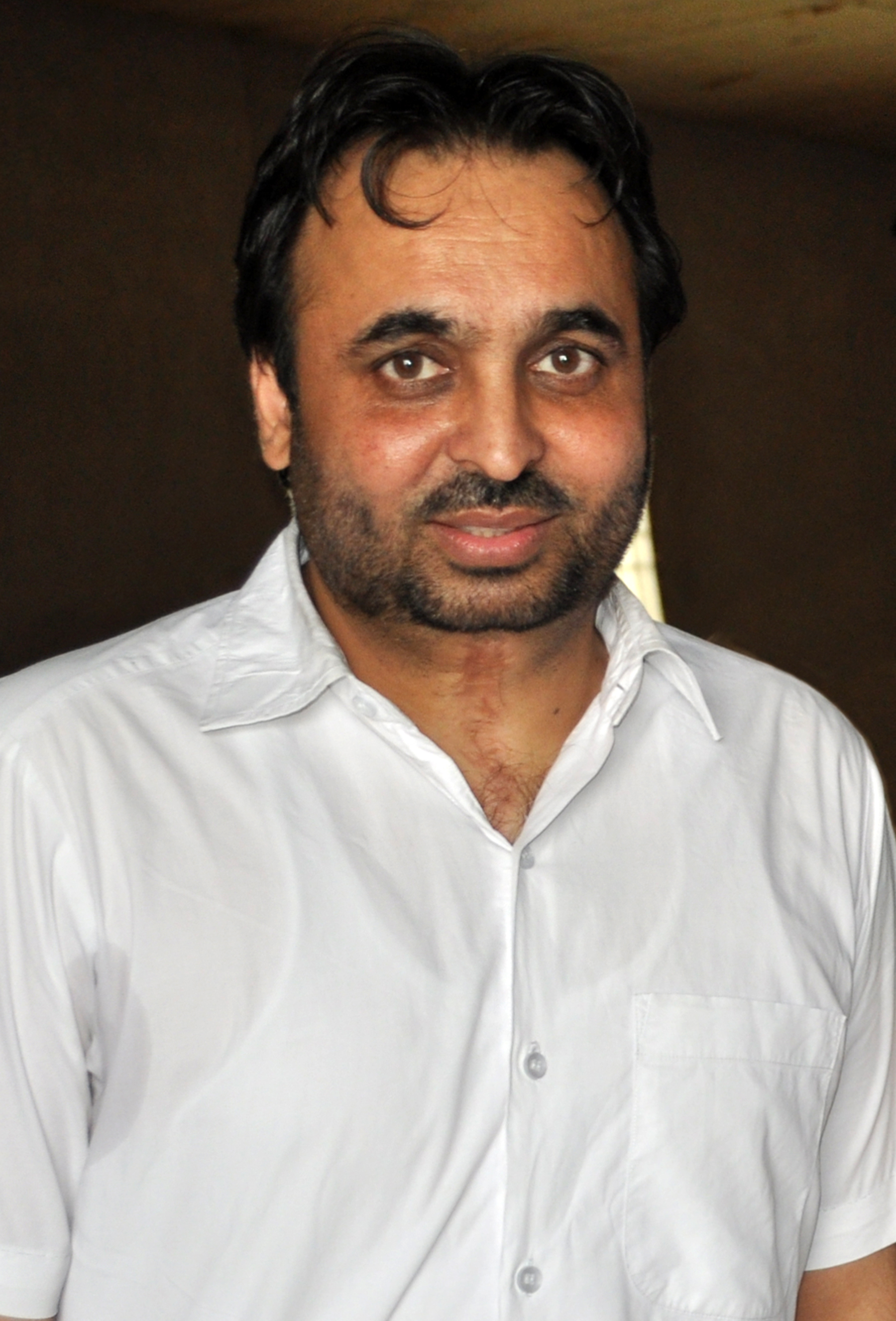

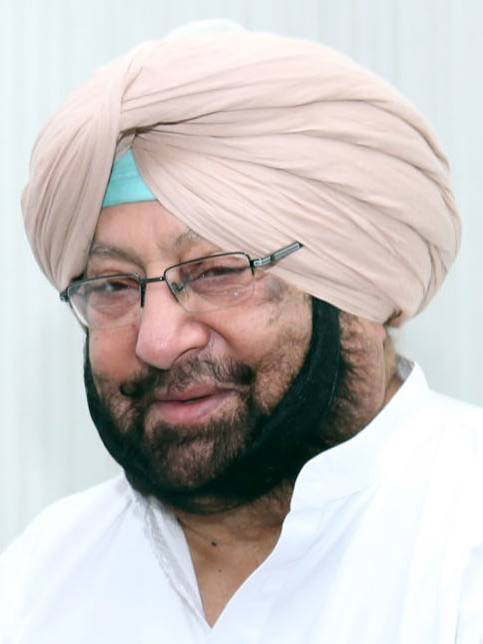

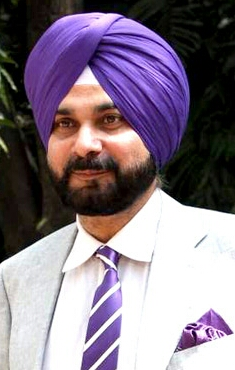
	First party	Second party
Leader	Sukhbir Singh Badal	Bhagwant Mann
Party	SAD	AAP
Alliance	NDA
Leader's seat	Did not contest	Sangrur
Last election	4 seats, 33.85%	–
Seats won	4	4
Seat change	Steady	▲4
Percentage	26.30%	24.40%
Swing	▼7.55%	▲24.40%
	Third party	Fourth party
Leader	Amarinder Singh	Navjot Singh Sidhu
Party	INC	BJP
Alliance	UPA	NDA
Leader's seat	Amritsar	Amritsar outgoing
Last election	8 seats, 45.23%	1 seat, 10.06%
Seats won	3	2
Seat change	▼5	▲1
Percentage	33.10%	8.70%
Swing	▼12.13%	▼1.36%
- Results by constituency
Prime Minister before election
Manmohan Singh
INC
Prime Minister after election
Narendra Modi
BJP

The 2014 Indian general elections was held in Punjab on 30 April 2014, making it the seventh phase of the elections.

== Parties and alliances ==
=== National Democratic Alliance ===
National Democratic Alliance
Party	Flag	Symbol	Leader	Seats
Shiromani Akali Dal			Sukhbir Singh Badal	10
Bharatiya Janata Party			Arun Jaitley	3
Total				13

=== Aam Aadmi Party ===
Aam Aadmi Party
Party	Flag	Symbol	Leader	Seats
Aam Aadmi Party			Arvind Kejriwal	13

=== United Progressive Alliance ===
Indian National Congress
Party	Flag	Symbol	Leader	Seats
Indian National Congress		Hand	Captain Amarinder Singh	13

== List of candidates ==
Constituency		UPA		NDA		AAP	
#	Name	Party	Candidate	Party	Candidate	Party	Candidate
1	Gurdaspur	INC	Partap Singh Bajwa	BJP	Vinod Khanna	AAP	Sucha Singh Chhotepur
2	Amritsar	INC	Captain Amarinder Singh	BJP	Arun Jaitley	AAP	Dr. Daljit Singh
3	Khadoor Sahib	INC	Harminder Singh Gill	SAD	Ranjit Singh Brahmpura	AAP	Baldeep Singh
4	Jalandhar (SC)	INC	Santokh Singh Chaudhary	SAD	Pawan Kumar Tinu	AAP	Jyoti Mann
5	Hoshiarpur (SC)	INC	Mohinder Singh Kaypee	BJP	Vijay Sampla	AAP	Yamini Gomar
6	Anandpur Sahib	INC	Ambika Soni	SAD	Prem Singh Chandumajra	AAP	Himmat Singh Shergill
7	Ludhiana	INC	Ravneet Singh Bittu	SAD	Manpreet Singh Ayali	AAP	H. S. Phoolka
8	Fatehgarh Sahib (SC)	INC	Sadhu Singh	SAD	Kulwant Singh	AAP	Harinder Singh Khalsa
9	Faridkot (SC)	INC	Joginder Singh	SAD	Paramjit Kaur Gulshan	AAP	Sadhu Singh
10	Firozpur	INC	Sunil Jakhar	SAD	Sher Singh Ghubaya	AAP	Satnam Paul Kamboj
11	Bathinda	INC	Manpreet Singh Badal	SAD	Harsimrat Kaur Badal	AAP	Jasraj Singh Longia
12	Sangrur	INC	Vijay Inder Singla	SAD	Sukhdev Singh Dhindsa	AAP	Bhagwant Mann
13	Patiala	INC	Preneet Kaur	SAD	Deepinder Singh Dhillon	AAP	Dharamvir Gandhi

== Results by Party/Alliance ==
Alliance/ Party		Popular vote			Seats		
Alliance/ Party		Votes	%	±pp	Contested	Won	+/−
NDA	SAD	3,636,148	26.26	▼7.59	10	4	Steady
NDA	BJP	1,209,004	8.73	▼1.33	3	2	▲1
NDA	Total	4,845,152	34.99	▼8.92	13	6	▲1
UPA	INC	4,575,879	33.05	▼12.18	13	3	▼5
AAP		3,373,062	24.36	▲24.36	13	4	▲4
Others		494,246	3.60	Steady	96	0	Steady
IND		498,039	3.60	▲1.28	118	0	Steady
Total		13,845,132	100	-	253	13	-

4	4	3	2
SAD	AAP	INC	BJP

== Elected MPs ==
Keys: SAD (4) AAP (4) INC (3) BJP (2)

Constituency		Winner				Runner Up				Margin	%
#	Name	Candidate	Party	Votes	%	Candidate	Party	Votes	%	Margin	%
1	Gurdaspur	Vinod Khanna	BJP	482,255	46.25	Partap Singh Bajwa	INC	346,190	33.20	136,065	13.05
2	Amritsar	Amarinder Singh	INC	482,876	47.94	Arun Jaitley	BJP	380,106	37.74	102,770	10.20
3	Khadoor Sahib	Ranjit Brahmpura	SAD	467,332	44.91	Harminder Singh Gill	INC	366,763	35.24	100,569	9.67
4	Jalandhar	Santokh Chaudhary	INC	380,479	36.56	Pawan Kumar Tinu	SAD	309,498	29.74	70,981	6.82
5	Hoshiarpur	Vijay Sampla	BJP	346,643	36.05	Mohinder Kaypee	INC	333,061	34.64	13,582	1.41
6	Anandpur Sahib	Prem Chandumajra	SAD	347,394	31.94	Ambika Soni	INC	323,697	29.77	23,697	2.17
7	Ludhiana	Ravneet Singh Bittu	INC	300,459	27.27	H. S. Phoolka	AAP	280,750	25.48	19,709	1.79
8	Fatehgarh Sahib	Harinder Khalsa	AAP	367,293	35.62	Sadhu Singh	INC	313,149	30.37	54,144	5.25
9	Faridkot	Sadhu Singh	AAP	450,751	43.66	Paramjit Kaur Gulshan	SAD	278,235	26.95	172,516	16.71
10	Firozpur	Sher Singh Ghubaya	SAD	487,932	44.13	Sunil Jakhar	INC	456,512	41.29	31,420	2.84
11	Bathinda	Harsimrat Kaur Badal	SAD	514,727	43.73	Manpreet Singh Badal	INC	495,332	42.09	19,395	1.64
12	Sangrur	Bhagwant Mann	AAP	533,237	48.47	Sukhdev Dhindsa	SAD	321,516	29.23	211,721	19.24
13	Patiala	Dharamvir Gandhi	AAP	365,671	32.62	Preneet Kaur	INC	344,729	30.75	20,942	1.87

== Post-election Union Council of Ministers from Punjab ==
#	Name	Constituency	Designation	Department	From	To	Party
1	Harsimrat Kaur Badal	Bathinda	Cabinet Minister	Food Processing Industries	27 May 2014	30 May 2019	SAD
2	Vijay Sampla	Hoshiarpur	MoS	Social Justice and Empowerment	9 November 2014	30 May 2019	BJP

== Assembly segments wise lead of parties ==

Party	Assembly segments
Aam Aadmi Party	34
Bharatiya Janata Party	16
Indian National Congress	37
Independent	1
Shiromani Akali Dal	29
Total	117

=== Constituency Wise ===
Constituency		Winner			Runner-up			Margin
#	Name	Candidate	Party	Votes	Candidate	Party	Votes	Margin
Gurdaspur Lok Sabha constituency
1	Sujanpur	Vinod Khanna	BJP	58,593	Partap Singh Bajwa	INC	38,407	20,186
2	Bhoa (SC)	Vinod Khanna	BJP	58,366	Partap Singh Bajwa	INC	40,625	17,741
3	Pathankot	Vinod Khanna	BJP	55,117	Partap Singh Bajwa	INC	34,185	20,932
4	Gurdaspur	Vinod Khanna	BJP	46,981	Partap Singh Bajwa	INC	30,810	16,171
5	Dina Nagar (SC)	Vinod Khanna	BJP	49,866	Partap Singh Bajwa	INC	42,205	7,661
6	Qadian	Vinod Khanna	BJP	52,050	Partap Singh Bajwa	INC	49,624	2,426
7	Batala	Vinod Khanna	BJP	45,563	Partap Singh Bajwa	INC	38,760	6,803
9	Fatehgarh Churian	Vinod Khanna	BJP	53,110	Partap Singh Bajwa	INC	34,515	18,595
10	Dera Baba Nanak	Vinod Khanna	BJP	62,396	Partap Singh Bajwa	INC	37,012	25,384
Amritsar Lok Sabha constituency
11	Ajnala	Amarinder Singh	INC	49,200	Arun Jaitley	BJP	48,844	356
12	Raja Sansi	Arun Jaitley	BJP	62,575	Amarinder Singh	INC	46,953	15,622
13	Majitha	Arun Jaitley	BJP	60,201	Amarinder Singh	INC	39,550	20,651
15	Amritsar North	Amarinder Singh	INC	63,393	Arun Jaitley	BJP	44,667	18,726
16	Amritsar West (SC)	Amarinder Singh	INC	65,042	Arun Jaitley	BJP	28,085	36,957
17	Amritsar Central	Amarinder Singh	INC	52,757	Arun Jaitley	BJP	33,761	18,996
18	Amritsar East	Amarinder Singh	INC	60,058	Arun Jaitley	BJP	27,860	32,198
19	Amritsar South	Amarinder Singh	INC	50,306	Arun Jaitley	BJP	28,409	21,897
20	Attari (SC)	Amarinder Singh	INC	55,595	Arun Jaitley	BJP	45,655	9,940
Khadoor Sahib Lok Sabha constituency
14	Jandiala (SC)	Ranjit Singh Brahmpura	SAD	44,914	Harminder Singh Gill	INC	38,617	6,297
21	Tarn Taran	Ranjit Singh Brahmpura	SAD	49,913	Harminder Singh Gill	INC	43,591	6,322
22	Khem Karan	Ranjit Singh Brahmpura	SAD	65,157	Harminder Singh Gill	INC	54,468	10,689
23	Patti	Ranjit Singh Brahmpura	SAD	62,326	Harminder Singh Gill	INC	47,630	14,696
24	Khadoor Sahib	Ranjit Singh Brahmpura	SAD	73,382	Harminder Singh Gill	INC	35,519	37,863
25	Baba Bakala (SC)	Ranjit Singh Brahmpura	SAD	43,008	Harminder Singh Gill	INC	36,553	6,455
27	Kapurthala	Ranjit Singh Brahmpura	SAD	36,155	Harminder Singh Gill	INC	34,279	1,876
28	Sultanpur Lodhi	Ranjit Singh Brahmpura	SAD	38,455	Harminder Singh Gill	INC	27,828	10,627
75	Zira	Ranjit Singh Brahmpura	SAD	53,928	Harminder Singh Gill	INC	48,257	5,671
Jalandhar Lok Sabha constituency
30	Phillaur (SC)	Santokh Singh Chaudhary	INC	49,000	Jyoti Mann	AAP	33,213	15,787
31	Nakodar	Pawan Kumar Tinu	SAD	37,497	Jyoti Mann	AAP	36,700	797
32	Shahkot	Pawan Kumar Tinu	SAD	47,862	Jyoti Mann	AAP	29,896	17,966
33	Kartarpur (SC)	Santokh Singh Chaudhary	INC	40,484	Pawan Kumar Tinu	SAD	39,686	798
34	Jalandhar West (SC)	Santokh Singh Chaudhary	INC	48,599	Pawan Kumar Tinu	SAD	27,118	21,481
35	Jalandhar Central	Santokh Singh Chaudhary	INC	40,066	Pawan Kumar Tinu	SAD	29,816	10,250
36	Jalandhar North	Santokh Singh Chaudhary	INC	53,038	Pawan Kumar Tinu	SAD	30,739	22,299
37	Jalandhar Cantt.	Santokh Singh Chaudhary	INC	44,932	Pawan Kumar Tinu	SAD	34,339	10,593
38	Adampur (SC)	Santokh Singh Chaudhary	INC	34,432	Pawan Kumar Tinu	SAD	29,966	4,466
Hoshiarpur Lok Sabha constituency
8	Sri Hargobindpur (SC)	Vijay Sampla	BJP	42,363	Mohinder Singh Kaypee	INC	40,194	2,169
26	Bholath	Vijay Sampla	BJP	38,772	Mohinder Singh Kaypee	INC	28,811	9,961
29	Phagwara (SC)	Mohinder Singh Kaypee	INC	38,804	Vijay Sampla	BJP	33,953	4,851
39	Mukerian	Vijay Sampla	BJP	52,130	Mohinder Singh Kaypee	INC	35,382	16,748
40	Dasuya	Vijay Sampla	BJP	43,975	Mohinder Singh Kaypee	INC	38,612	5,363
41	Urmar	Vijay Sampla	BJP	37,282	Mohinder Singh Kaypee	INC	36,561	721
42	Sham Chaurasi (SC)	Mohinder Singh Kaypee	INC	40,231	Vijay Sampla	BJP	31,784	8,447
43	Hoshiarpur	Mohinder Singh Kaypee	INC	38,877	Vijay Sampla	BJP	37,113	1,764
44	Chabbewal (SC)	Mohinder Singh Kaypee	INC	35,455	Vijay Sampla	BJP	28,969	6,486
Anandpur Sahib Lok Sabha constituency
45	Garhshankar	Ambika Soni	INC	35,749	Prem Singh Chandumajra	SAD	34,549	1,200
46	Banga (SC)	Himmat Singh Shergill	AAP	38,633	Ambika Soni	INC	28,138	10,495
47	Nawan Shahr	Himmat Singh Shergill	AAP	35,635	Ambika Soni	INC	30,025	5,610
48	Balachaur	Ambika Soni	INC	35,045	Prem Singh Chandumajra	SAD	34,351	694
49	Anandpur Sahib	Prem Singh Chandumajra	SAD	50,864	Ambika Soni	INC	40,907	9,957
50	Rupnagar	Ambika Soni	INC	39,373	Prem Singh Chandumajra	SAD	38,576	797
51	Chamkaur Sahib (SC)	Himmat Singh Shergill	AAP	47,016	Ambika Soni	INC	39,676	7,340
52	Kharar	Prem Singh Chandumajra	SAD	50,174	Himmat Singh Shergill	AAP	45,098	5,076
53	S.A.S. Nagar	Himmat Singh Shergill	AAP	50,987	Prem Singh Chandumajra	SAD	43,714	7,273
Ludhiana Lok Sabha constituency
60	Ludhiana East	Ravneet Singh Bittu	INC	38,813	Manpreet Singh Ayali	SAD	31,324	7,489
61	Ludhiana South	Simarjit Singh Bains	IND	42,734	Ravneet Singh Bittu	INC	19,293	23,441
62	Atam Nagar	Simarjit Singh Bains	IND	43,093	H. S. Phoolka	AAP	22,702	20,391
63	Ludhiana Central	Ravneet Singh Bittu	INC	37,768	Manpreet Singh Ayali	SAD	26,727	11,041
64	Ludhiana West	Ravneet Singh Bittu	INC	42,205	Manpreet Singh Ayali	SAD	38,241	3,964
65	Ludhiana North	Ravneet Singh Bittu	INC	47,179	Manpreet Singh Ayali	SAD	29,508	17,671
66	Gill (SC)	H. S. Phoolka	AAP	47,133	Ravneet Singh Bittu	INC	46,044	1,089
68	Dakha	H. S. Phoolka	AAP	46,518	Manpreet Singh Ayali	SAD	40,736	5,782
70	Jagraon (SC)	Manpreet Singh Ayali	SAD	26,303	Ravneet Singh Bittu	INC	23,845	2,458
Fatehgarh Sahib Lok Sabha constituency
54	Bassi Pathana (SC)	Harinder Singh Khalsa	AAP	40,033	Sadhu Singh	INC	28,416	11,617
55	Fatehgarh Sahib	Harinder Singh Khalsa	AAP	36,591	Sadhu Singh	INC	35,654	937
56	Amloh	Sadhu Singh	INC	35,620	Kulwant Singh	SAD	31,741	3,879
57	Khanna	Sadhu Singh	INC	41,316	Harinder Singh Khalsa	AAP	39,509	1,807
58	Samrala	Harinder Singh Khalsa	AAP	40,745	Kulwant Singh	SAD	40,244	501
59	Sahnewal	Kulwant Singh	SAD	56,188	Sadhu Singh	INC	51,620	4,568
67	Payal (SC)	Harinder Singh Khalsa	AAP	42,213	Kulwant Singh	SAD	37,459	4,754
69	Raikot (SC)	Harinder Singh Khalsa	AAP	59,482	Kulwant Singh	SAD	24,952	34,530
106	Amargarh	Harinder Singh Khalsa	AAP	45,648	Kulwant Singh	SAD	33,980	11,668
Faridkot Lok Sabha constituency
71	Nihal Singhwala (SC)	Sadhu Singh	AAP	75,173	Paramjit Kaur Gulshan	SAD	24,661	50,512
72	Bhagha Purana	Sadhu Singh	AAP	60,833	Paramjit Kaur Gulshan	SAD	29,075	31,758
73	Moga	Sadhu Singh	AAP	72,558	Joginder Singh	INC	24,384	48,174
74	Dharamkot	Sadhu Singh	AAP	51,891	Paramjit Kaur Gulshan	SAD	33,892	17,999
84	Gidderbaha	Joginder Singh	INC	51,308	Paramjit Kaur Gulshan	SAD	48,372	2,936
87	Faridkot	Sadhu Singh	AAP	53,168	Paramjit Kaur Gulshan	SAD	24,021	29,147
88	Kotkapura	Sadhu Singh	AAP	47,247	Joginder Singh	INC	27,047	20,200
89	Jaitu (SC)	Sadhu Singh	AAP	45,531	Paramjit Kaur Gulshan	SAD	29,110	16,421
90	Rampura Phul	Paramjit Kaur Gulshan	SAD	39,872	Joginder Singh	INC	39,168	704
Firozpur Lok Sabha constituency
76	Firozpur City	Sunil Jakhar	INC	54,605	Sher Singh Ghubaya	SAD	40,050	14,555
77	Firozpur Rural (SC)	Sher Singh Ghubaya	SAD	57,818	Sunil Jakhar	INC	49,916	7,902
78	Guru Har Sahai	Sher Singh Ghubaya	SAD	53,277	Sunil Jakhar	INC	43,849	9,428
79	Jalalabad	Sher Singh Ghubaya	SAD	81,948	Sunil Jakhar	INC	49,060	32,888
80	Fazilka	Sher Singh Ghubaya	SAD	61,013	Sunil Jakhar	INC	50,966	10,047
81	Abohar	Sunil Jakhar	INC	46,357	Sher Singh Ghubaya	SAD	40,695	5,662
82	Balluana (SC)	Sunil Jakhar	INC	54,210	Sher Singh Ghubaya	SAD	48,446	5,764
85	Malout (SC)	Sher Singh Ghubaya	SAD	59,740	Sunil Jakhar	INC	50,906	8,834
86	Muktsar	Sher Singh Ghubaya	SAD	56,796	Sunil Jakhar	INC	51,908	4,888
Bathinda Lok Sabha constituency
83	Lambi	Harsimrat Kaur Badal	SAD	69,409	Manpreet Singh Badal	INC	35,190	34,219
91	Bhucho Mandi (SC)	Harsimrat Kaur Badal	SAD	61,983	Manpreet Singh Badal	INC	56,982	5,001
92	Bathinda Urban	Manpreet Singh Badal	INC	71,303	Harsimrat Kaur Badal	SAD	41,987	29,316
93	Bathinda Rural (SC)	Manpreet Singh Badal	INC	49,384	Harsimrat Kaur Badal	SAD	45,811	3,573
94	Talwandi Sabo	Harsimrat Kaur Badal	SAD	47,305	Manpreet Singh Badal	INC	36,051	11,254
95	Maur	Harsimrat Kaur Badal	SAD	54,705	Manpreet Singh Badal	INC	52,929	1,776
96	Mansa	Manpreet Singh Badal	INC	79,780	Harsimrat Kaur Badal	SAD	55,869	23,911
97	Sardulgarh	Harsimrat Kaur Badal	SAD	70,766	Manpreet Singh Badal	INC	50,198	20,568
98	Budhlada (SC)	Harsimrat Kaur Badal	SAD	66,727	Manpreet Singh Badal	INC	63,415	3,312
Sangrur Lok Sabha constituency
99	Lehra	Sukhdev Singh Dhindsa	SAD	46,606	Bhagwant Mann	AAP	35,230	11,376
100	Dirba (SC)	Bhagwant Mann	AAP	59,678	Sukhdev Singh Dhindsa	SAD	43,958	15,720
101	Sunam	Bhagwant Mann	AAP	63,979	Sukhdev Singh Dhindsa	SAD	50,745	13,234
102	Bhadaur (SC)	Bhagwant Mann	AAP	60,534	Sukhdev Singh Dhindsa	SAD	31,800	28,734
103	Barnala	Bhagwant Mann	AAP	67,234	Sukhdev Singh Dhindsa	SAD	28,809	38,425
104	Mehal Kalan (SC)	Bhagwant Mann	AAP	67,855	Sukhdev Singh Dhindsa	SAD	29,724	38,131
105	Malerkotla	Bhagwant Mann	AAP	57,981	Sukhdev Singh Dhindsa	SAD	27,892	30,089
107	Dhuri	Bhagwant Mann	AAP	63,189	Sukhdev Singh Dhindsa	SAD	29,352	33,837
108	Sangrur	Bhagwant Mann	AAP	57,511	Vijay Inder Singla	INC	34,937	22,574
Patiala Lok Sabha constituency
109	Nabha (SC)	Dharamvir Gandhi	AAP	52,187	Preneet Kaur	INC	37,690	14,497
110	Patiala Rural	Deepinder Singh Dhillon	SAD	37,482	Dharamvir Gandhi	AAP	33,857	3,625
111	Rajpura	Preneet Kaur	INC	37,378	Deepinder Singh Dhillon	SAD	35,300	2,078
112	Dera Bassi	Deepinder Singh Dhillon	SAD	81,419	Dharamvir Gandhi	AAP	42,523	38,896
113	Ghanaur	Deepinder Singh Dhillon	SAD	36,287	Preneet Kaur	INC	35,300	987
114	Sanour	Dharamvir Gandhi	AAP	48,867	Deepinder Singh Dhillon	SAD	41,694	7,173
115	Patiala	Preneet Kaur	INC	43,238	Dharamvir Gandhi	AAP	35,674	7,564
116	Samana	Preneet Kaur	INC	41,194	Deepinder Singh Dhillon	SAD	40,447	747
117	Shutrana (SC)	Dharamvir Gandhi	AAP	47,366	Deepinder Singh Dhillon	SAD	40,560	6,806
