= 2009 Indian general election in Punjab =

- April–May 2009

13 seats
- Turnout: 69.78%
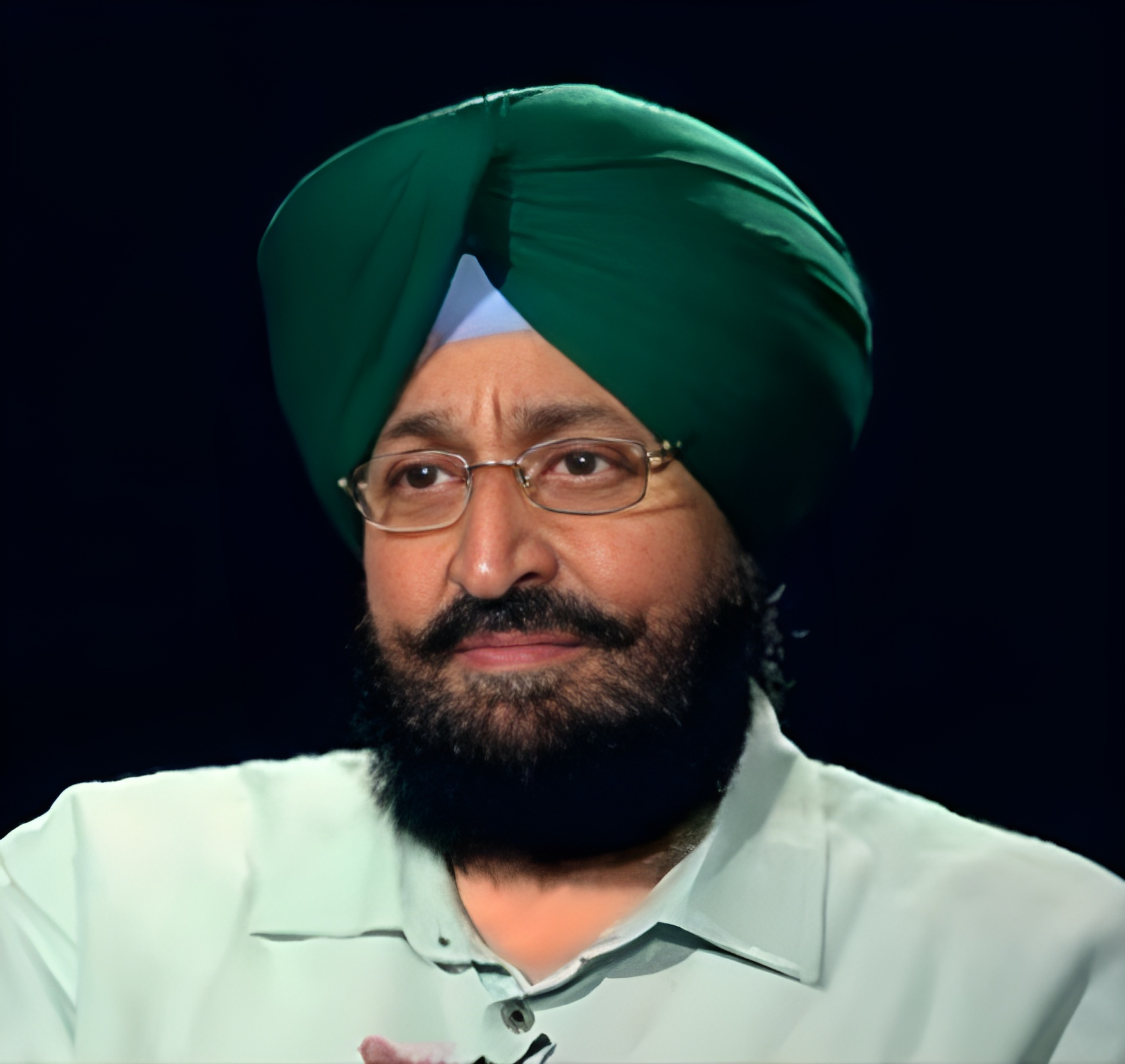

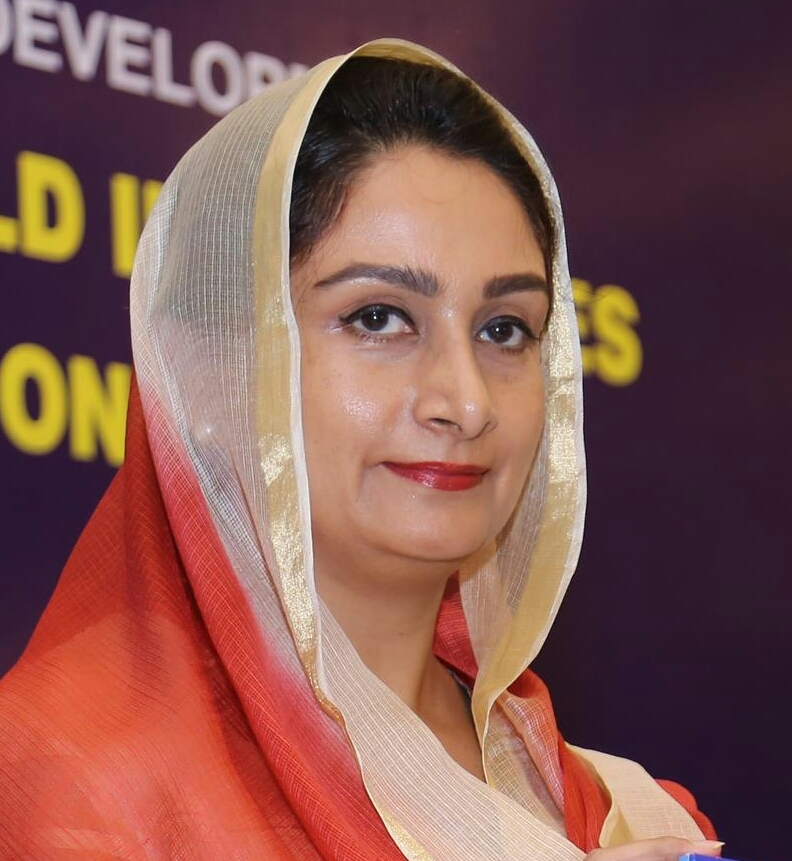

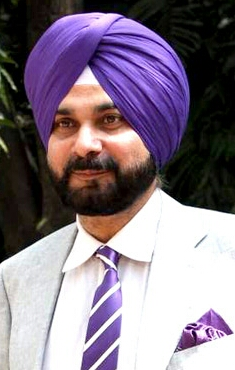
	First party	Second party	Third party
Leader	Pratap Singh Bajwa	Harsimrat Kaur Badal	Navjot Singh Sidhu
Party	INC	SAD	BJP
Alliance	UPA	NDA	NDA
Leader's seat	Gurdaspur	Bathinda	Amritsar
Last election	2 seats, 34.17%	8 seats, 34.28%	3 seats, 10.48%
Seats won	8	4	1
Seat change	▲6	▼4	▼2
Percentage	45.23%	33.85%	10.06%
Swing	▲11.06%	▼0.43%	▼0.42%
- Results by constituency
Prime Minister before election
Manmohan Singh
INC
Prime Minister after election
Manmohan Singh
INC

The 2009 Indian general election in Punjab was held for 13 Lok Sabha seats in the state. Punjab went to the Lok Sabha elections in two phases, on 7 May and 13 May. There were 13 Lok Sabha seats in Punjab; elections were held for 4 seats on 7 May and the remaining 9 seats on 13 May..

== Parties and alliances ==
=== United Progressive Alliance ===
No.	Party	Flag	Symbol	Leader	Seats contested
1.	Indian National Congress		Hand	Captain Amarinder Singh	13

=== National Democratic Alliance ===
No.	Party	Flag	Symbol	Leader	Seats contested
1.	Shiromani Akali Dal (Badal)			Sukhbir Singh Badal	10
2.	Bharatiya Janata Party			Navjot Singh Sidhu	3

== List of candidates ==
Constituency		UPA		NDA	
#	Name	Party	Candidate	Party	Candidate
1	Gurdaspur	INC	Partap Singh Bajwa	BJP	Vinod Khanna
2	Amritsar	INC	Om Parkash Soni	BJP	Navjot Singh Sidhu
3	Khadoor Sahib	INC	Rana Gurjeet Singh	SAD	Rattan Singh Ajnala
4	Jalandhar	INC	Mohinder Singh Kaypee	SAD	Hans Raj Hans
5	Hoshiarpur	INC	Santosh Chowdhary	BJP	Som Parkash
6	Anandpur Sahib	INC	Ravneet Singh	SAD	Daljit Singh Cheema
7	Ludhiana	INC	Manish Tewari	SAD	Gurcharan Singh Galib
8	Fatehgarh Sahib	INC	Sukhdev Singh Libra	SAD	Charanjit Singh Atwal
9	Faridkot	INC	Sukhwinder Singh Danny	SAD	Paramjit Kaur Gulshan
10	Ferozepur	INC	Jagmeet Singh Brar	SAD	Sher Singh Ghubaya
11	Bathinda	INC	Raninder Singh	SAD	Harsimrat Kaur Badal
12	Sangrur	INC	Vijay Inder Singla	SAD	Sukhdev Singh Dhindsa
13	Patiala	INC	Preneet Kaur	SAD	Prem Singh Chandumajra

== Results by Party/Alliance ==
Alliance/ Party		Popular vote			Seats		
Alliance/ Party		Votes	%	±pp	Contested	Won	+/−
UPA	INC	5,350,377	45.23	▲11.06	13	8	▲6
NDA	SAD	4,004,789	33.85	▼0.43	10	4	▼4
NDA	BJP	1,190,144	10.06	▼0.42	3	1	▼2
NDA	Total	5,194,933	43.91	▼0.85	13	5	▼6
Others		1,009,548	8.53	Steady	79	0	Steady
IND		274,446	2.32	▼0.43	113	0	Steady
Total		11,829,304	100%	-	218	13	-

== Results ==
Indian National Congress got majority of 8 seats. Shiromani Akali Dal and Bharatiya Janata Party got 4 and 1 seats respectively.

=== Elected MPs ===
Constituency		Winner				Runner Up				Margin	%
#	Name	Candidate	Party	Votes	%	Candidate	Party	Votes	%	Margin	%
1	Gurdaspur	Partap Singh Bajwa	INC	447,994	48.00	Vinod Khanna	BJP	439,652	47.10	8,342	0.90
2	Amritsar	Navjot Singh Sidhu	BJP	392,046	48.13	Om Parkash Soni	INC	385,188	47.29	6,858	0.84
3	Khadoor Sahib	Rattan Singh Ajnala	SAD	467,980	49.44	Rana Gurjeet Singh	INC	435,720	46.03	32,260	3.41
4	Jalandhar	Mohinder Kaypee	INC	408,103	45.36	Hans Raj Hans	SAD	371,658	41.31	36,445	4.05
5	Hoshiarpur	Santosh Chowdhary	INC	358,812	42.55	Som Parkash	BJP	358,446	42.51	366	0.04
6	Anandpur Sahib	Ravneet Singh Bittu	INC	404,836	44.75	Daljit Singh Cheema	SAD	337,632	37.32	67,204	7.43
7	Ludhiana	Manish Tewari	INC	449,264	53.08	Gurcharan Galib	SAD	335,558	39.65	113,706	13.43
8	Fatehgarh Sahib	Sukhdev Singh Libra	INC	393,557	46.96	Charanjit Singh Atwal	SAD	359,258	42.86	34,299	4.10
9	Faridkot	Paramjit Kaur Gulshan	SAD	457,734	49.19	Sukhwinder Singh Danny	INC	395,692	42.52	62,042	6.67
10	Ferozpur	Sher Singh Ghubaya	SAD	450,900	47.12	Jagmeet Singh Brar	INC	429,829	44.92	21,071	2.20
11	Bathinda (SC)	Harsimrat Kaur Badal	SAD	529,472	50.51	Raninder Singh	INC	408,524	38.97	120,948	11.54
12	Sangrur	Vijay Inder Singla	INC	358,670	38.52	Sukhdev Singh Dhindsa	SAD	317,798	34.13	40,872	4.39
13	Patiala	Preneet Kaur	INC	474,188	50.66	Prem Singh Chandumajra	SAD	376,799	40.26	97,389	10.40

== Post-election Union Council of Ministers from Punjab ==
#	Name	Constituency	Designation	Department	From	To	Party
1	Ambika Soni	Punjab (Rajya Sabha)	Cabinet Minister	Information and Broadcasting	28 May 2009	27 Oct 2012	INC
2	M. S. Gill	Punjab (Rajya Sabha)	Cabinet Minister	Youth Affairs and Sports	28 May 2009	19 Jan 2011	INC
2	M. S. Gill	Punjab (Rajya Sabha)	MoS(I/C)	Statistics and Programme Implementation	19 Jan 2011	12 July 2011	INC
3	Ashwani Kumar	Punjab (Rajya Sabha)	MoS	Planning; Parliamentary Affairs; Science and Technology; Earth Sciences	19 Jan 2011	28 Oct 2012	INC
3	Ashwani Kumar	Punjab (Rajya Sabha)	Cabinet Minister	Law and Justice	28 Oct 2012	11 May 2013	INC
4	Preneet Kaur	Patiala	MoS	External Affairs	28 Oct 2012	26 May 2014	INC
5	Manish Tewari	Ludhiana	MoS(I/C)	Information and Broadcasting	28 Oct 2012	26 May 2014	INC
6	Santosh Chowdhary	Hoshiarpur	MoS	Health and Family Welfare	17 June 2013	26 May 2014	INC

== Assembly segments wise lead of Parties ==

Party	Assembly segments
Indian National Congress	65
Shiromani Akali Dal	41
Bharatiya Janata Party	11
Total	117
