= Politics of Punjab, India =

Politics of the contemporary Indian state of Punjab (1967–present)

Politics in reorganised present-day Punjab is dominated by mainly four parties – Indian National Congress, Aam Aadmi Party, Bharatiya Janata Party and Shiromani Akali Dal (Badal). Since 1967, Chief Minister of Punjab has been predominantly from Jat Sikh community despite its 21 percent state population. Exceptions are Giani Zail Singh, the Chief Minister of Punjab from 17 March 1972 to 30 April 1977 belonging to Ramgarhia community that has population of 6 percent and is a part of significant OBC community having population of 31.3 percent in the state and Charanjit Singh Channi who held the position for 111 days from 20 September 2021 to 16 March 2022 and was from Scheduled Caste(Dalit) who have 32 percent population in the state. Other prominent party is Bahujan Samaj Party especially in Doaba region founded by Kanshi Ram of Rupnagar district. In 1992 BSP won 9 seats Vidhan Sabha elections. Also BSP won 3 lok sabha seats from Punjab in 1996 general elections and only Garhshanker seat in 1997 Vidhan Sabha elections. Communist parties too have some influence in the Malwa area. In the 2014 general elections, the first-time contesting Aam Aadmi Party got 4 out of 13 seats in Punjab by winning 34 of the total 117 assembly segments, coming second in 7, third in 73 and fourth in the rest 3 segments. The support for the Aam Aadmi Party increased later in Punjab. The current Government was elected in the 2022 Punjab Assembly elections and the AAP won 92 out of 117 Assembly seats with Bhagwant Mann as the Chief Minister. The Congress flows down to get only 18 seats.

== History ==
=== Pre-1947 period ===
Before 1947 partition of Punjab, politics were dominated by Unionist Party as it was main party in united Punjab especially seen in 1937 elections.

=== 1947–1966 ===
During 1947-1966 Punjab was undivided and consisted of present-day Punjab, Haryana, Himachal Pradesh, and Chandigarh. This meant that both population and religion factor of whole state was mixed and politics were dominated by Indian National Congress.

== Political parties ==
Political Party	Party Flag	Party Electoral Symbol	Political Leaning	Founded	Founder	State Unit Leader	Lok Sabha	Rajya Sabha	Punjab Legislative Assembly
Aam Aadmi Party			Centre	26 November 2012	Arvind Kejriwal	Bhagwant Mann	3 / 13	1 / 7	94 / 117
Shiromani Akali Dal			Conservatism Punjabiyat Federalism	14 December 1920	Master Tara Singh	Sukhbir Singh Badal	1 / 13	1 / 7	3 / 117
Bharatiya Janata Party			Hindutva Right-wing Nationalism	6 April 1980	Atal Bihari Vajpayee	Kewal Singh Dhillon	0 / 13	6 / 7	2 / 117
Shiromani Akali Dal (Amritsar)			Sikhism Radical Sikh Separatism	1 May 1994	Splinter Faction (Collective Group)	Simranjit Singh Mann	0 / 13	0 / 7	0 / 117
Indian National Congress		Hand	Secularism Liberalism	28 December 1885	Allan Octavian Hume	Charanjit Singh Channi	7 / 13	0 / 7	16 / 117
Akali Dal (Waris Punjab De)			Punjabiyat Right-wing populism	14 January 2025	Amritpal Singh	Amritpal Singh	2 / 13	0 / 7	1 / 117

== Maps ==
=== Punjab in Map of India ===
Punjab is situated in Northern India and shares its boundary with three states – Rajasthan, Haryana and Himachal Pradesh and with two Union territories of Jammu and Kashmir and Chandigarh. It also shares its border with Pakistan.

Punjab

The election Schedule will declare by Election Commission of India on the reasonable time.

Last year election dates were announced on 8 January and polling was completed on 20 February 2022. Results were declared on 10 March 2022.

=== Map of Punjab ===
Punjab has 23 districts (Malerkotla is the 23rd District, carved out from Sangrur District in May, 2021) and is divided into 4 regions, having 117 total constituencies.

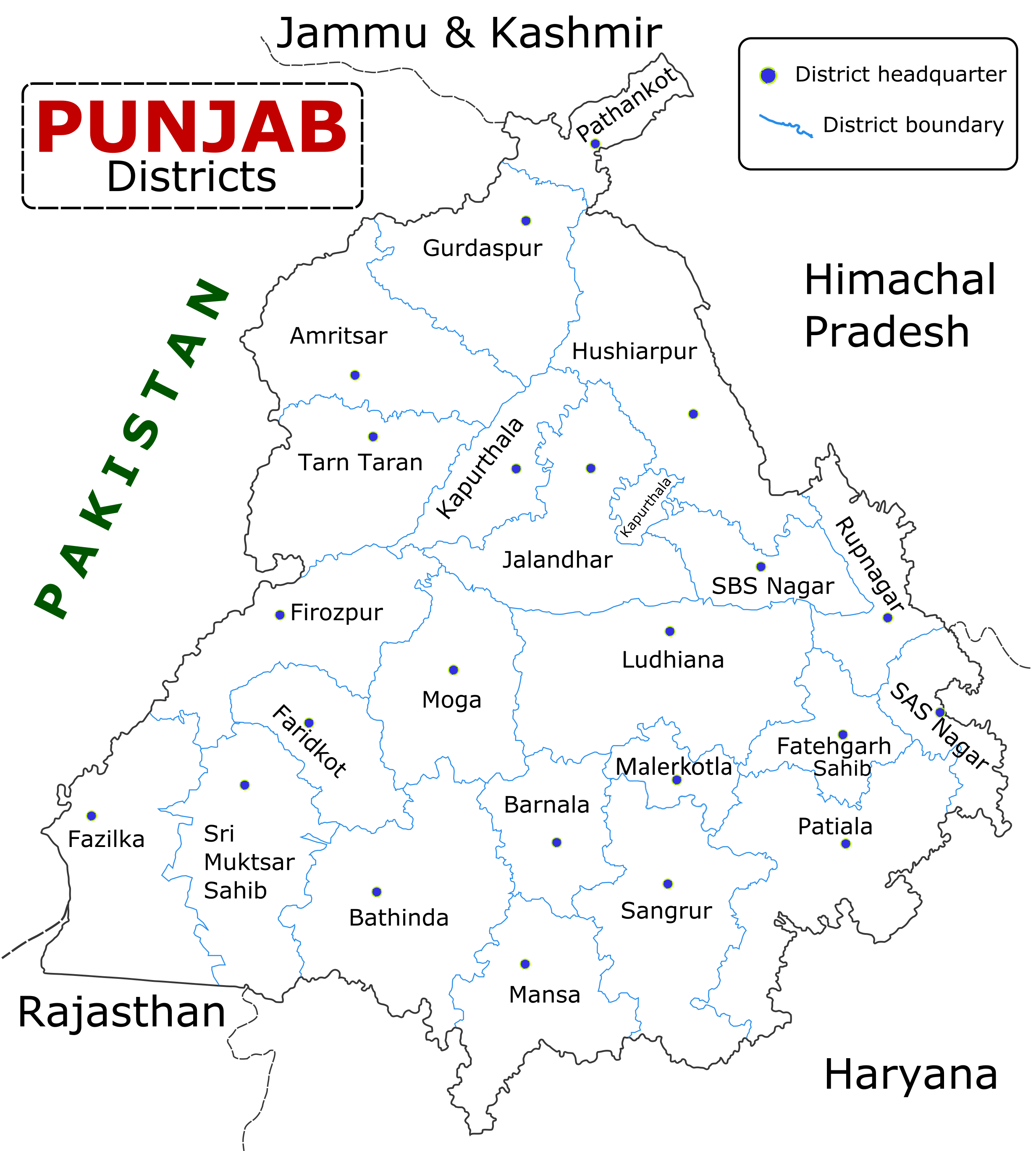
All the 23 districts of Punjab along with their headquarters.

1. Majha region have 4 district and 25 Assembly constituencies
2. Doaba is the smallest region with 23 assembly constituencies and 4 districts
3. Malwa is the biggest region with 15 districts (including 3 districts in Puadh region) and 69 assembly constituencies
4. 34 seats are reserved for Scheduled Castes and Punjab have no reservation for ST community.

=== Legislative Assembly Seats Map ===
This year Punjab will see Major Fight between Indian National Congress, Shiromani Akali Dal and Aam Aadmi Party, Bharatiya Janata Party and Punjab Democratic Alliance.

34 Seats are Reserved for SC's and 83 are unreserved out of 117 assembly Constituencies of Punjab

=== Region and District wise list of Assembly constituencies ===
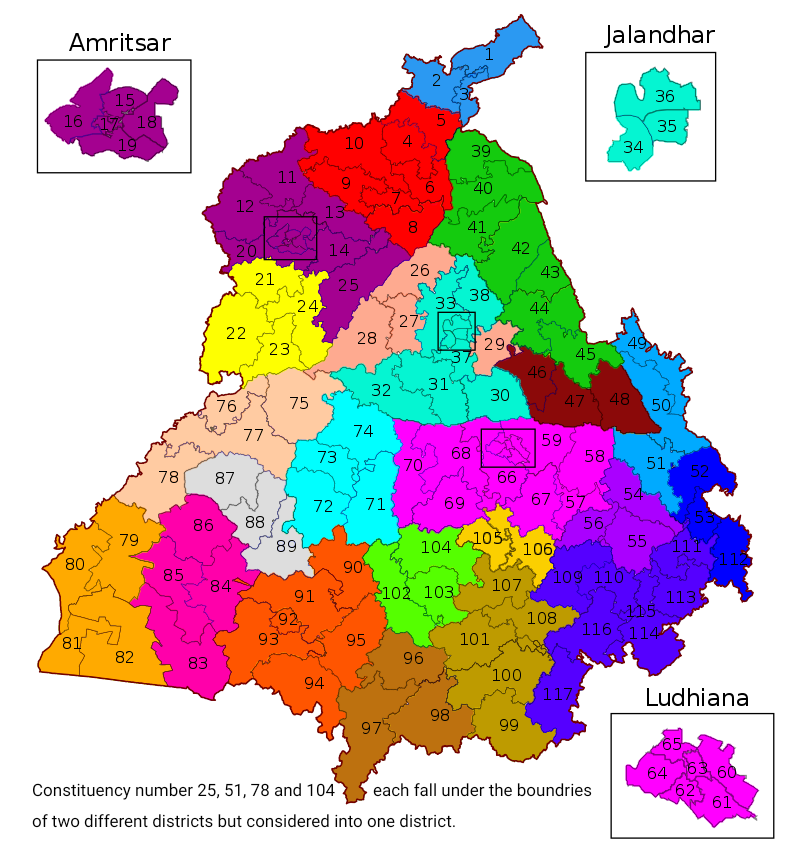
This map shows the Districts and Assembly constituencies in the District

S. No.	Region	District	AC No.	Assembly Constituency
1.	MAJHA			
1.	MAJHA	Pathankot	1	Sujanpur
2.	MAJHA	Pathankot	2	Bhoa
3.	MAJHA	Pathankot	3	Pathankot
4.	MAJHA	Gurdaspur	4	Gurdaspur
5.	MAJHA	Gurdaspur	5	Dina Nagar
6.	MAJHA	Gurdaspur	6	Qadian
7.	MAJHA	Gurdaspur	7	Batala
8.	MAJHA	Gurdaspur	8.	Sri Hargobindpur
9.	MAJHA	Gurdaspur	9	Fatehgarh Churian
10.	MAJHA	Gurdaspur	10	Dera Baba Nanak
11.	MAJHA	Sri Amritsar Sahib	11	Ajnala
12.	MAJHA	Sri Amritsar Sahib	12	Raja Sansi
13.	MAJHA	Sri Amritsar Sahib	13	Majitha
14.	MAJHA	Sri Amritsar Sahib	15	Amritsar North
15.	MAJHA	Sri Amritsar Sahib	16	Amritsar West
16.	MAJHA	Sri Amritsar Sahib	17	Amritsar Central
17.	MAJHA	Sri Amritsar Sahib	18	Amritsar East
18.	MAJHA	Sri Amritsar Sahib	19	Amritsar South
19.	MAJHA	Sri Amritsar Sahib	20	Attari
20.	MAJHA	Sri Amritsar Sahib	14	Jandiala
21.	MAJHA	Tarn Taran Sahib	21	Tarn Taran
22.	MAJHA	Sri Tarn Taran Sahib	22	Khem Karan
23.	MAJHA	Sri Tarn Taran Sahib	23	Patti
24.	MAJHA	Sri Tarn Taran Sahib	24	Khadoor Sahib
25.	MAJHA	Sri Amritsar Sahib	25	Baba Bakala
2.	DOABA			
26.	DOABA	Kapurthala	27	Kapurthala
27.	DOABA	Kapurthala	28	Sultanpur Lodhi
28.	DOABA	Kapurthala	29.	Phagwara
29.	DOABA	Jalandhar	30	Phillaur
30.	DOABA	Jalandhar	31	Nakodar
31.	DOABA	Jalandhar	32	Shahkot
32.	DOABA	Jalandhar	33	Kartarpur
33.	DOABA	Jalandhar	34	Jalandhar West
34.	DOABA	Jalandhar	35	Jalandhar Central
35.	DOABA	Jalandhar	36	Jalandhar North
36.	DOABA	Jalandhar	37	Jalandhar Cantt.
37.	DOABA	Jalandhar	38	Adampur
38.	DOABA	Kapurthala	26	Bholath
39.	DOABA	Hoshiarpur	39	Mukerian
40.	DOABA	Hoshiarpur	40	Dasuya
41.	DOABA	Hoshiarpur	41	Urmar
42.	DOABA	Hoshiarpur	42	Sham Chaurasi
43.	DOABA	Hoshiarpur	43	Hoshiarpur
44.	DOABA	Hoshiarpur	44	Chabbewal
45.	DOABA	Hoshiarpur	45	Garhshankar
46.	DOABA	NawanShahr	46	Banga
47.	DOABA	NawanShahr	47	Nawanshahr
48.	DOABA	NawanShahr	48	Balachaur
3.	MALWA			
49.	MALWA	Rupnagar	49	Anandpur Sahib
50.	MALWA	Rupnagar	50	Rupnagar
51.	MALWA	Rupnagar	51	Chamkaur Sahib
52.	MALWA	Mohali	52	Kharar
53.	MALWA	Mohali	53	S.A.S. Nagar
54.	MALWA	Ludhiana	60	Ludhiana East
55.	MALWA	Ludhiana	61	Ludhiana South
56.	MALWA	Ludhiana	62	Atam Nagar
57.	MALWA	Ludhiana	63	Ludhiana Central
58.	MALWA	Ludhiana	64	Ludhiana West
59.	MALWA	Ludhiana	65	Ludhiana North
60.	MALWA	Ludhiana	66	Gill
61.	MALWA	Ludhiana	68	Dakha
62.	MALWA	Ludhiana	70	Jagraon
63.	MALWA	Sri Fatehgarh Sahib	54	Bassi Pathana
64.	MALWA	Sri Fatehgarh Sahib	55	Fatehgarh Sahib
65.	MALWA	Sri Fatehgarh Sahib	56	Amloh
66.	MALWA	Ludhiana	57	Khanna
67.	MALWA	Ludhiana	58	Samrala
68.	MALWA	Ludhiana	59	Sahnewal
69.	MALWA	Ludhiana	67	Payal
70.	MALWA	Ludhiana	69	Raikot
71.	MALWA	Sangrur	106	Amargarh
72.	MALWA	Moga	71	Nihal Singhwala
73.	MALWA	Moga	72	Bhagha Purana
74.	MALWA	Moga	73	Moga
75.	MALWA	Moga	74	Dharamkot
76.	MALWA	Firozpur	75.	Zira
77.	MALWA	Sri Mukatsar Sahib	84	Gidderbaha
78.	MALWA	Faridkot	87	Faridkot
79.	MALWA	Faridkot	88	Kotkapura
80.	MALWA	Faridkot	89	Jaitu
81.	MALWA	Bathinda	90	Rampura Phul
82.	MALWA	Firozpur	76	Firozpur City
83.	MALWA	Firozpur	77	Firozpur Rural
84.	MALWA	Firozpur	78	Guru Har Sahai
85.	MALWA	Fazilka	79	Jalalabad
86.	MALWA	Fazilka	80	Fazilka
87.	MALWA	Fazilka	81	Abohar
88.	MALWA	Fazilka	82	Balluana
89.	MALWA	Sri Mukatsar Sahib	85	Malout
90.	MALWA	Sri Mukatsar Sahib	86	Muktsar
91.	MALWA	Sri Mukatsar Sahib	83	Lambi
92.	MALWA	Bathinda	91	Bhucho Mandi
93.	MALWA	Bathinda	92	Bathinda Urban
94.	MALWA	Bathinda	93	Bathinda Rural
95.	MALWA	Bathinda	94	Talwandi Sabo
96.	MALWA	Bathinda	95	Maur
97.	MALWA	Mansa	96	Mansa
98.	MALWA	Mansa	97	Sardulgarh
99.	MALWA	Mansa	98	Budhlada
100.	MALWA	Sangrur	99	Lehra
101.	MALWA	Sangrur	100	Dirba
102.	MALWA	Sangrur	101	Sunam
103.	MALWA	Barnala	102	Bhadaur
104.	MALWA	Barnala	103	Barnala
105.	MALWA	Barnala	104	Mehal Kalan
106.	MALWA	Sangrur	105	Malerkotla
107.	MALWA	Sangrur	107	Dhuri
108.	MALWA	Sangrur	108	Sangrur
109.	MALWA	Patiala	109	Nabha
110.	MALWA	Patiala	110	Patiala Rural
111.	MALWA	Patiala	111	Rajpura
112.	MALWA	Mohali	112	Dera Bassi
113.	MALWA	Patiala	113	Ghanaur
114.	MALWA	Patiala	114	Sanour
115.	MALWA	Patiala	115	Patiala
116.	MALWA	Patiala	116	Samana
117.	MALWA	Patiala	117	Shutrana

== Constituencies ==
Following is the list of parliamentary constituencies (PC) and assembly constituencies (AC) of Punjab:-

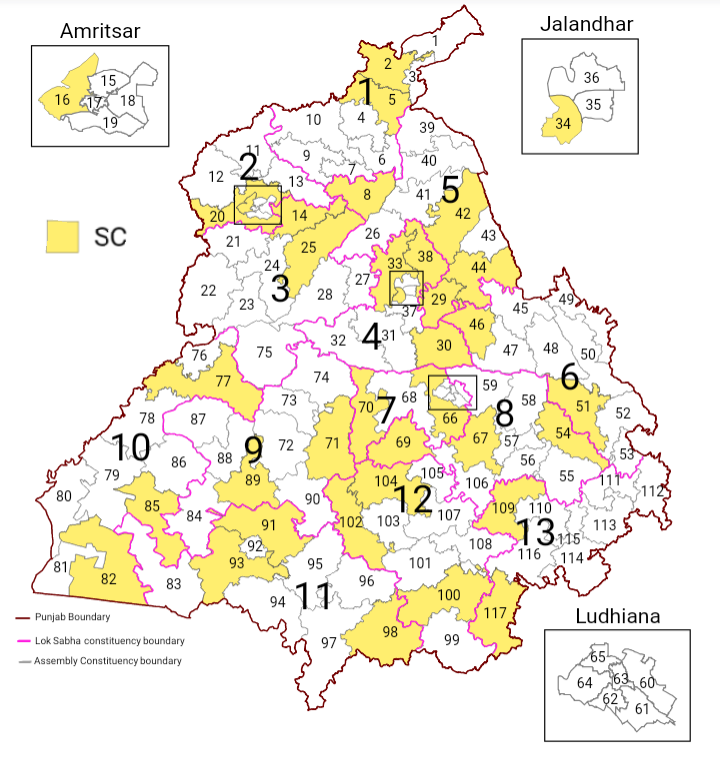
In Punjab each Parliamentary constituency consists Nine Assembly constituencies.

PC No.	Parliamentary Constituency	AC No.	Assembly Constituency
1	Gurdaspur		
1	Gurdaspur	1	Sujanpur
1	Gurdaspur	2	Bhoa
1	Gurdaspur	3	Pathankot
1	Gurdaspur	4	Gurdaspur
1	Gurdaspur	5	Dina Nagar
1	Gurdaspur	6	Qadian
1	Gurdaspur	7	Batala
1	Gurdaspur	9	Fatehgarh Churian
1	Gurdaspur	10	Dera Baba Nanak
2	Amritsar	11	Ajnala
2	Amritsar	12	Raja Sansi
2	Amritsar	13	Majitha
2	Amritsar	15	Amritsar North
2	Amritsar	16	Amritsar West
2	Amritsar	17	Amritsar Central
2	Amritsar	18	Amritsar East
2	Amritsar	19	Amritsar South
2	Amritsar	20	Attari
3	Khadoor Sahib	14	Jandiala
3	Khadoor Sahib	21	Tarn Taran
3	Khadoor Sahib	22	Khem Karan
3	Khadoor Sahib	23	Patti
3	Khadoor Sahib	24	Khadoor Sahib
3	Khadoor Sahib	25	Baba Bakala
3	Khadoor Sahib	27	Kapurthala
3	Khadoor Sahib	28	Sultanpur Lodhi
3	Khadoor Sahib	75	Zira
4	Jalandhar	30	Phillaur
4	Jalandhar	31	Nakodar
4	Jalandhar	32	Shahkot
4	Jalandhar	33	Kartarpur
4	Jalandhar	34	Jalandhar West
4	Jalandhar	35	Jalandhar Central
4	Jalandhar	36	Jalandhar North
4	Jalandhar	37	Jalandhar Cantt.
4	Jalandhar	38	Adampur
5	Hoshiarpur	8	Sri Hargobindpur
5	Hoshiarpur	26	Bholath
5	Hoshiarpur	29	Phagwara
5	Hoshiarpur	39	Mukerian
5	Hoshiarpur	40	Dasuya
5	Hoshiarpur	41	Urmar
5	Hoshiarpur	42	Sham Chaurasi
5	Hoshiarpur	43	Hoshiarpur
5	Hoshiarpur	44	Chabbewal
6	Anandpur Sahib	45	Garhshankar
6	Anandpur Sahib	46	Banga
6	Anandpur Sahib	47	Nawanshahr
6	Anandpur Sahib	48	Balachaur
6	Anandpur Sahib	49	Anandpur Sahib
6	Anandpur Sahib	50	Rupnagar
6	Anandpur Sahib	51	Chamkaur Sahib
6	Anandpur Sahib	52	Kharar
6	Anandpur Sahib	53	S.A.S. Nagar
7	Ludhiana	60	Ludhiana East
7	Ludhiana	61	Ludhiana South
7	Ludhiana	62	Atam Nagar
7	Ludhiana	63	Ludhiana Central
7	Ludhiana	64	Ludhiana West
7	Ludhiana	65	Ludhiana North
7	Ludhiana	66	Gill
7	Ludhiana	68	Dakha
7	Ludhiana	70	Jagraon
8	Fatehgarh Sahib	54	Bassi Pathana
8	Fatehgarh Sahib	55	Fatehgarh Sahib
8	Fatehgarh Sahib	56	Amloh
8	Fatehgarh Sahib	57	Khanna
8	Fatehgarh Sahib	58	Samrala
8	Fatehgarh Sahib	59	Sahnewal
8	Fatehgarh Sahib	67	Payal
8	Fatehgarh Sahib	69	Raikot
8	Fatehgarh Sahib	106	Amargarh
9	Faridkot	71	Nihal Singhwala
9	Faridkot	72	Bhagha Purana
9	Faridkot	73	Moga
9	Faridkot	74	Dharamkot
9	Faridkot	84	Gidderbaha
9	Faridkot	87	Faridkot
9	Faridkot	88	Kotkapura
9	Faridkot	89	Jaitu
9	Faridkot	90	Rampura Phul
10	Ferozepur	76	Firozpur City
10	Ferozepur	77	Firozpur Rural
10	Ferozepur	78	Guru Har Sahai
10	Ferozepur	79	Jalalabad
10	Ferozepur	80	Fazilka
10	Ferozepur	81	Abohar
10	Ferozepur	82	Balluana
10	Ferozepur	85	Malout
10	Ferozepur	86	Muktsar
11	Bathinda	83	Lambi
11	Bathinda	91	Bhucho Mandi
11	Bathinda	92	Bathinda Urban
11	Bathinda	93	Bathinda Rural
11	Bathinda	94	Talwandi Sabo
11	Bathinda	95	Maur
11	Bathinda	96	Mansa
11	Bathinda	97	Sardulgarh
11	Bathinda	98	Budhlada
12	Sangrur	99	Lehra
12	Sangrur	100	Dirba
12	Sangrur	101	Sunam
12	Sangrur	102	Bhadaur
12	Sangrur	103	Barnala
12	Sangrur	104	Mehal Kalan
12	Sangrur	105	Malerkotla
12	Sangrur	107	Dhuri
12	Sangrur	108	Sangrur
13	Patiala	109	Nabha
13	Patiala	110	Patiala Rural
13	Patiala	111	Rajpura
13	Patiala	112	Dera Bassi
13	Patiala	113	Ghanaur
13	Patiala	114	Sanour
13	Patiala	115	Patiala
13	Patiala	116	Samana
13	Patiala	117	Shutrana

== Former Constituencies ==
The most recent Delimitation Commission was constituted on July 12, 2002. The recommendations of the commission were approved by the Presidential notification on February 19, 2008. With this, three of the constituencies were eliminated. The Lok Sabha constituencies abolished, as a result, were as follows:

1. Phillaur constituency
2. Ropar constituency
3. Tarn Taran constituency

== See also ==
- List of Incumbent Members of Parliament from Punjab, India
- 2022 Punjab Legislative Assembly election
- List of constituencies of Punjab Legislative Assembly
- Politics of India
- Punjab, Pakistan
- Punjab, India
- History of the Punjab
- Punjabi people
- Elections in Punjab
- Convener of Aam Aadmi Party (Punjab, India)
