= List of Lok Sabha members from Punjab =

Lok Sabha members from Punjab, India

There are total 13 members of Parliament of Lok Sabha from Punjab.

Lok Sabha members are elected from 13 single member constituencies by First past the post voting system. Last election was held on all seats in 2024.

== Party position ==

- Indian National Congress - 7
- Aam Aadmi Party - 3
- Akali Dal (Waris Punjab De) - 2
- Shiromani Akali Dal - 1

S. No.	Party	Total Members
1	Indian National Congress	7 / 13
2	Aam Aadmi Party	3 / 13
3	Akali Dal (Waris Punjab De)	2 / 13
4	Shiromani Akali Dal	1 / 13
Total		13

== Incumbent members ==
Map displaying constituencies won by parties

7	3	2	1
INC	AAP	AD(WPD)	SAD

Following is the list of Member of Parliament, Lok Sabha of India from Punjab.

Keys:

- Indian National Congress (7)
- Aam Admi Party (3)
- Akali Dal (Waris Punjab De) (2) (Note: Both MPs were elected as Independent during election, later on they established their own political party.)
- Shiromani Akali Dal (1)

Other Keys

- C - Consecutive term
- NC - Non-Consecutive term

S. No.	Constituency	Name	Portrait	Since	Party	Elections	Term
1	Gurdaspur	Sukhjinder Singh Randhawa		June 2024	Indian National Congress	2024	1
2	Amritsar	Gurjeet Singh Aujla		March 2017	Indian National Congress	2017 (by-election); 2019; 2024	3 (C)
3	Khadoor Sahib	Amritpal Singh		June 2024	Akali Dal (Waris Punjab De)	2024	1
4	Jalandhar	Charanjit Singh Channi		June 2024	Indian National Congress	2024	1
5	Hoshiarpur	Raj Kumar Chabbewal		June 2024	Aam Admi Party	2024	1
6	Anandpur Sahib	Malwinder Singh Kang		June 2024	Aam Admi Party	2024	1
7	Ludhiana	Amrinder Singh Raja Warring		June 2024	Indian National Congress	2024	1
8	Fatehgarh Sahib	Amar Singh		May 2019	Indian National Congress	2019; 2024	2 (C)
9	Faridkot	Sarabjeet Singh Khalsa		June 2024	Akali Dal (Waris Punjab De)	2024	1
10	Ferozpur	Sher Singh Ghubaya		June 2024	Indian National Congress	2009; 2014; 2024	3 (NC)
11	Bathinda	Harsimrat Kaur Badal		May 2009	Shiromani Akali Dal	2009; 2014; 2019; 2024	4 (C)
12	Sangrur	Gurmeet Singh Meet Hayer		June 2024	Aam Admi Party	2024	1
13	Patiala	Dharamvir Gandhi		June 2024	Indian National Congress	2014; 2024	2 (NC)

== See also ==
- List of Rajya Sabha members from Punjab
- 2024 Indian general election in Punjab
