= Adampur Assembly constituency =

Adampur Assembly constituency may refer to

- Adampur, Haryana Assembly constituency
- Adampur, Punjab Assembly constituency
