= Prem Singh Chandumajra =

Indian politician

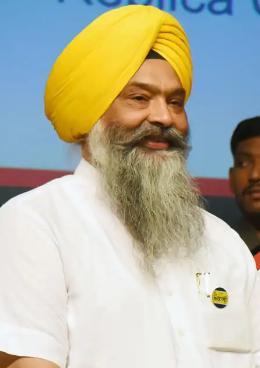

General Secretary, Shiromani Akali Dal

Member of Parliament for Anandpur Sahib
- In office 2014 – 24 May 2019
- Preceded by: Ravneet Singh
- Succeeded by: Manish Tewari
- Constituency: Anandpur Sahib

Personal details
- Born: 1 January 1950 (age 76) Chandumajra, East Punjab, India
- Party: Shiromani Akali Dal (Punar Surjit)
- Other political affiliations: Shiromani Akali Dal
- Spouse: Balwinder Kaur
- Children: Two sons
- Education: Punjabi University (MA)
- Website: Website

Prem Singh Chandumajra (born 1 January 1950) is a senior spokesman of Shiromani Akali Dal (Punar Surjit), former General Secretary and spokesman of the Shiromani Akali Dal, former Member of Parliament from Anandpur Sahib, and former constituency MP from Patiala seat. He is also an alumnus of Punjabi University, Patiala. He was a Member of Parliament in 11th, 12th and now of 16th Lok Sabha. He won with a low margin from Himmat Singh Shergill and Ambika Soni, who put up a tough fight.

== Education and career ==
Chandumajra is a post graduate in Economics and Political Science. He began his career with a job as economics lecturer in Government College, Derabassi. After a two-year stint, he joined the Punjab School Education Board as subject-expert in economics.

== Political career ==
Chandumajra started his political career with student activism. During student politics he came into contact with Akali leader Harcharan Singh Longowal, the president of Shiromani Akali Dal, who subsequently appointed him the first president of Youth Akali Dal. Chandumajra became member of Punjab Vidhan Sabha in 1985, representing Dakala, Patiala. During this term, he became the cabinet minister for cooperation in Surjit Singh Barnala government. He was elected to the eleventh Lok Sabha in 1996 by defeating Sant Ram Singla and elected to the twelfth Lok Sabha in 1998 by defeating Capt. Amarinder Singh. Chandumajra contested from Patiala Lok Sabha seat in 2004 on the ticket of Sarb Hind Shiromani Akali Dal, a rebel faction headed by Gurcharan Singh Tohra. Later he became president of Shiromani Akali Dal (Longowal), which was later merged into SAD led by Parkash Singh Badal in year 2007. He has been elected in the Lok Sabha elections 2014 from Anandpur Sahib on SAD ticket.

== Electoral performance ==
2024 Indian general election: Anandpur Sahib
Party	Candidate	Votes	%	±%
AAP	Malwinder Singh Kang	313,217	29.08	▲24.18
INC	Vijay Inder Singla	302,371	28.07	▼11.5
BJP	Subhash Sharma	186,578	17.32	New entry
SAD	Prem Singh Chandumajra	117,936	10.95	▼24.29
BSP	Jasvir Singh Garhi	90,157	8.37	▼5.17
SAD(A)	Khushalpal Singh Mann	24,831	2.31	New
NOTA	None of the Above	6,402	0.59	▼0.99
Majority		10,846	1.01	▼1.15
Turnout		1,077,123		
AAP gain from INC		Swing	▲24.18	

Lok Sabha
Preceded by Ravneet Singh Bittu	Member of Parliament for Anandpur Sahib; 2014 – 2019	Succeeded by Manish Tewari
