= V. N. Tiwari =

Indian Parliamentarian from Punjab

Vishwa Nath Tiwari
- Photograph of V.N. Tiwari in circa 1957
- Born: 1936
- Died: 3 April 1984 (aged 47–48); Chandigarh, India
- Occupations: Politician, author

Vishwa Nath Tiwari (1936 – 3 April 1984) was an Indian author and parliamentarian. He wrote books in Punjabi, English and Hindi. He was nominated as member of the Rajya Sabha in 1982, and served till his death.

== Books ==
- Indian politics at the crossroads
- Punjab, a cultural
- Nehru and Indian literature
- The language of Chandigarh
- Bhāī Wīra Siṅgha, sandarabha-kosha
- Pañjābī te Pañjāba
- Nānaka simarana
- Cuppa dī paiṛa
- Ikalla toṃ ikalla dā safara
- Kukkha dī corī

== Family ==
Tiwari was married to Amrit Tewari. His son Manish Tewari is a member of the Indian National Congress and Member of Parliament from Chandigarh constituency. His son had also served, as the Minister of Information and Broadcasting in the government of India in UPA 2 government.

== Awards ==
Tiwari won the Sahitya Akademi Award in 1981 for his poetry book Garaj Ton Footpath Teek.

== Death ==
Tiwari was assassinated by Khalistani militants at Sector 24, Chandigarh, while on a morning walk in 1984. Surinder Singh Sodhi, deemed by Jarnail Singh Bhindranwale as his right arm, was responsible for the killing.
