= Sukhwinder Singh Kotli =

Indian politician

Member of the Punjab Legislative Assembly
- Incumbent
- Assumed office 2022
- Preceded by: Pawan Kumar Tinu
- Constituency: Adampur
- Majority: Indian National Congress

Personal details
- Party: Indian National Congress
- Occupation: Politician

Sukhwinder Singh Kotli is an Indian politician representing the Adampur, Punjab Assembly constituency in the Punjab Legislative Assembly. He is a member of the Indian National Congress.

== Member of Legislative Assembly ==
He represents the Adampur, Punjab Assembly constituency as MLA in Punjab Assembly.

Committee assignments of Punjab Legislative Assembly

- Member - Committee on estimates
- Member - Committee of Panchayati Raj Institutions

== Electoral performance ==
Punjab Assembly election, 2022: Adampur
Party	Candidate	Votes	%	±%
INC	Sukhwinder Singh Kotli	39,554	35.10	▲2.8
SAD	Pawan Kumar Tinu	34,987	31.10	▼7.8
AAP	Jit Lal Bhaati	28,947	25.70	▲4.0
Independent	Parshotam Raj Ahir	5,751	5.1	▲0.4
PLC	Jagdish Kumar Jassal	1,282	1.1	New entry
NOTA	None of the above	1,159	0.7	
Majority		4,567	4.01	
Turnout		113,753	67.7	
Registered electors		167,938		
