= Harminder Singh Gill =

Former member of Punjab Legislative Assembly

Member of the Punjab Legislative Assembly
- In office 11 March 2017 – 10 March 2022
- Preceded by: Partap Singh Kairon
- Succeeded by: Laljit Singh Bhullar
- Constituency: Patti

Personal details
- Born: 20 July 1963 (age 63) Amritsar, Punjab, India
- Party: Indian National Congress
- Spouse: Paramjit Kaur
- Children: 2
- Parent(s): Dalip Singh (Father); Balbir Kaur (Mother)
- Education: Guru Nanak Dev University (BSc, MA)
- Occupation: Politician

Harminder Singh Gill (born 20 July 1963) is an Indian politician and a member of the Indian National Congress. He is a former member of the Punjab Legislative Assembly who represented Patti from 2017 to 2022. During the tenure of Amarinder Singh as chief minister, Gill remained a member of Punjab Subordinate Selection Board and a general secretary of Punjab Pradesh Congress Committee.
