= Adampur, Punjab Assembly constituency =

Legislative Assembly constituency in Punjab State, India

Coordinates: 31.43°N 75.72°E

Adampur
- Constituency No. 38 for the Punjab Legislative Assembly

Constituency details
- Country: India
- State: Punjab
- District: Jalandhar
- Lok Sabha constituency: Jalandhar
- Established: 1951
- Total electors: 167,424 (in 2022)
- Reservation: SC

Member of Legislative Assembly
- 16th Punjab Legislative Assembly
- Incumbent Sukhwinder Singh Kotli
- Party: Indian National Congress
- Elected year: 2022

Adampur is a Punjab Legislative Assembly constituency in Jalandhar district, Punjab state, India.

== Members of the Legislative Assembly ==
Most successful parties from Adampur, Punjab Vidhan Sabha
1. INC (5 Times) (33.3%)
2. SAD (5 Times) (33.3%)
3. CPI (2 Times) (13.3%)
4. BSP (1 Time) (6.67%)
5. IND (1 Time) (6.67%)
6. JP (1 Time) (6.67%)

| Year | Member | Party |
|---|---|---|
| 1951 | Gurbanta Singh | Indian National Congress |
| 1951 | Mota Singh | Indian National Congress |
Constituency defunct (1957-1967)
| 1967 | D. Singh | Indian National Congress |
| 1969 | Kulwant Singh | Communist Party of India |
| 1972 | Harbhajan Singh | Independent |
| 1977 | Sarup Singh | Janata Party |
| 1980 | Kulwant Singh | Communist Party of India |
| 1985 | Surjit Singh | Shiromani Akali Dal |
| 1992 | Rajender Kumar | Bahujan Samaj Party |
| 1997 | Saroop Singh | Shiromani Akali Dal |
| 2002 | Kanwaljit Singh Lally | Indian National Congress |
| 2007 | Sarbjeet Singh Makkar | Shiromani Akali Dal |
| 2012 | Pawan Kumar Tinu | Shiromani Akali Dal |
| 2017 | Pawan Kumar Tinu | Shiromani Akali Dal |
| 2022 | Sukhwinder Singh Kotli | Indian National Congress |

== Election results ==
=== 2027 ===
Punjab Assembly election, 2027: Adampur
| Party | Candidate | Votes | % | ±% |
|---|---|---|---|---|
| AAP | Pawan Kumar Tinu | | | |
| AD (WPD) | | | | New entry |
| INC | | | | |
| BSP | | | | |
| SAD | | | | |
| BJP | | | | New entry |
| NOTA | None of the above | | | |
| Majority | | | | |
| Turnout | | | | |

=== 2022 ===
Punjab Assembly election, 2022: Adampur
| Party | Candidate | Votes | % | ±% |
|---|---|---|---|---|
| INC | Sukhwinder Singh Kotli | 39,554 | 35.10 | ▲2.8 |
| SAD | Pawan Kumar Tinu | 34,987 | 31.10 | ▼7.8 |
| AAP | Jit Lal Bhaati | 28,947 | 25.70 | ▲4.0 |
| IND | Parshotam Raj Ahir | 5,751 | 5.1 | ▲0.4 |
| PLC | Jagdish Kumar Jassal | 1,282 | 1.1 | New entry |
| NOTA | None of the above | 1,159 | 0.7 | |
| Majority | | 4,567 | 4.01 | |
| Turnout | | 113,753 | 67.7 | |
| Registered electors | | 167,938 | | |

=== 2017 ===
Punjab Assembly election, 2017: Adampur
| Party | Candidate | Votes | % | ±% |
|---|---|---|---|---|
| SAD | Pawan Kumar Tinu | 45,229 | 38.9 | |
| INC | Mohinder Singh Kaypee | 37,530 | 32.30 | |
| AAP | Hans Raj Rana | 25,239 | 21.70 | |
| BSP | Sewa Singh | 5,405 | 4.7 | |
| NOTA | None of the above | 621 | 0.4 | |
| Majority | | 7,699 | 6.7 | |
| Turnout | | 115,615 | 73.4 | |
| Registered electors | | 158,382 | | |

=== Previous years ===
| Year | A C No. | Category | Name | Party | Votes | Runner Up | Party | Votes |
|---|---|---|---|---|---|---|---|---|
| 2012 | 38 | SC | Sh. Pawan Kumar Tinu | SAD | 48171 | Sh. Satnam Singh Kainth | INC | 28865 |
| 2007 | 27 | GEN | Sarbjeet Singh Makkar | SAD | 44883 | Kanwaljit Singh Lally | INC | 34643 |
| 2002 | 28 | GEN | Kanwaljit Singh Lally | INC | 32619 | Sarabjit Singh Makkar | SAD | 25243 |
| 1997 | 28 | GEN | Saroop Singh | SAD | 40578 | Kanwaljit Singh Lally | INC | 24274 |
| 1992 | 28 | GEN | Rajender Kumar | BSP | 7847 | Manjinder Singh | INC | 7235 |
| 1985 | 28 | GEN | Surjit Singh | SAD | 26115 | Dwarka Dass | INC | 18966 |
| 1980 | 28 | GEN | Kulwant Singh | CPI | 25368 | Iqbal Singh | INC(I) | 19968 |
| 1977 | 28 | GEN | Sarup Singh | JNP | 19116 | Kulwant Singh | CPI | 15018 |
| 1972 | 53 | GEN | Harbhajan Singh | IND | 17773 | Kulwant Singh | CPI | 14064 |
| 1969 | 53 | GEN | Kulwant Singh | CPI | 17733 | Karam Singh | INC | 12890 |
| 1967 | 53 | GEN | D. Singh | INC | 17485 | K. Singh | CPI | 16989 |
| 1951 | 65 | GEN | Mota Singh | INC | 20684 | Niranjan Singh | SAD | 14970 |
| 1951 | 65 | GEN | Gurbanta Singh | INC | 19366 | Kartara Ram Mirhas | SCF | 13941 |
