= Sadhu Singh =

Indian politician and academic

Member of Parliament, Lok Sabha
- In office 2014–2019
- Preceded by: Paramjit Kaur Gulshan
- Succeeded by: Muhammad Sadiq
- Constituency: Faridkot

Personal details
- Born: 1941 (age 84–85) Manuke, Moga, Punjab, British India
- Party: Aam Aadmi Party
- Profession: Politician, Retired Professor

Sadhu Singh is an Indian academic and politician from Punjab. He was a member of parliament from Faridkot from 2014 to 2019. He is part of the Aam Aadmi Party and is a member of its national executive committee.

== Early life and education ==
Sadhu Singh was born in the village of Manuke Gill in Moga District in 1941. He joined the irrigation department as a draughtsman in Chandigarh in 1961. He continued his studies and was awarded a M.A. degree in English from Punjab University, Chandigarh in 1970. He also attained degree of Budhiman (Proficiency in Punjabi) from Panjab University in Chandhigarh. He also taught the subject of English to paramedical classes at Baba Farid University of Health Sciences, Faridkot.

== Career ==
He was selected by Punjab Public Service Commission as a college lecturer in English in 1970. He served at Government Brijindra College Faridkot from 1971 to 1999 as lecturer in English and worked for College Lecturer Association (G.C.L.A.) Punjab. After retirement in 1999, he worked as Principal in K. K. Marwah Girls College, Faridkot.

== Publication ==
Singh has authored two books of Punjabi poetry, Pyasi Mehak and Saleeb Te Sargam and has been associated with numerous literary and cultural Sabhas and Kendri Punjabi Lekhak Sabha.

== Politics ==
Singh contested the 2014 Indian general election on an Aam Aadmi Party ticket from Faridkot constituency and defeated Shiromani Akali Dal's Paramjit Kaur Gulshan by 172,516 votes.

== See also ==
- 2017 Punjab Legislative Assembly election

Lok Sabha
Preceded by Paramjit Kaur Gulshan	Member of Parliament in Lok Sabha for Faridkot, Punjab; 2014 – 2019	Succeeded by Muhammad Sadiq
Aam Aadmi Party political offices
New political party	Member of Political Affairs Committee of AAP ? – present	Incumbent
New political party	Member of National Executive Committee of AAP ? – present	Incumbent
