= Manish Tewari =

Indian politician and lawyer born 1965

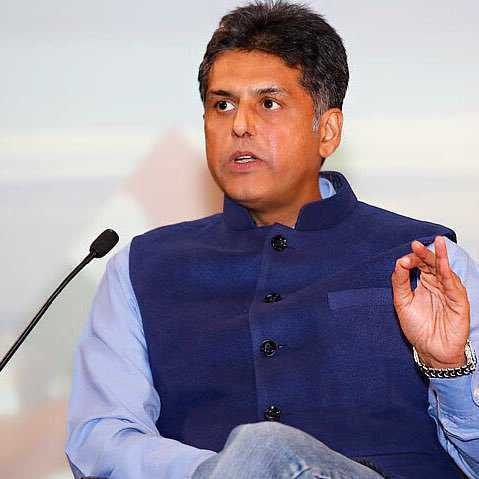
- Tewari in 2014

Member of Parliament, Lok Sabha
- Incumbent
- Assumed office 4 June 2024
- Preceded by: Kirron Kher
- Constituency: Chandigarh
- In office 23 May 2019 – 4 June 2024
- Preceded by: Prem Singh Chandumajra
- Succeeded by: Malwinder Singh Kang
- Constituency: Anandpur Sahib
- In office 16 May 2009 – 18 May 2014
- Preceded by: Sharanjit Singh Dhillon
- Succeeded by: Ravneet Singh Bittu
- Constituency: Ludhiana

Minister of State (Independent Charge) for Information and Broadcasting
- In office 28 October 2012 – 26 May 2014
- Prime Minister: Manmohan Singh
- Preceded by: Ambika Soni
- Succeeded by: Prakash Javdekar

President of Indian Youth Congress
- In office 1998–2003
- Preceded by: Satyajit D. Gaekwad
- Succeeded by: Randeep Surjewala

President of National Students Union of India
- In office 1986–1993
- Preceded by: Mukul Wasnik
- Succeeded by: Saleem Ahmad

Personal details
- Born: 8 December 1965 (age 60) Chandigarh, Punjab, India
- Party: Indian National Congress
- Spouse: Naznin Shifa Tewari
- Education: (B.A., LLB)
- Alma mater: Panjab University; Delhi University
- Occupation: Politician

Manish Tewari (born 8 December 1965) is an Indian lawyer and politician. He is a member of the Indian National Congress and represents Chandigarh in the current 18th Lok Sabha. He represented Anandpur Sahib in the 17th Lok Sabha. He was Minister of Information and Broadcasting from 2012 to 2014 and a Member of Parliament from Ludhiana from 2009 to 2014. He contested and won from Chandigarh in the 2024 Indian general election.

== Personal life ==
Manish Tewari was born on 8 December 1965 in Chandigarh, India to V.N. Tiwari, an author of Punjabi language and a professor at the Panjab University; and mother Amrit Tewari, a dentist who worked as Professor and Head, Oral Health Sciences Center, and Dean at Post Graduate Institute of Medical Education and Research. His father was killed by Khalistani militants in 1984. His mother died in 2018 following a cardiac arrest. Tewari's maternal grandfather, Sardar Tirath Singh was a lawyer and a minister in Congress' government in the state of Punjab.

He studied from St. John's High School, Chandigarh. Tewari attained a Bachelor's of Arts degree from Panjab University, Chandigarh and later a Bachelor of Laws from the University of Delhi. During his time at the Panjab University, he led the sports teams in swimming and water polo. Tewari married Naznin Shifa, a Parsi in March 1996 and now resides in Lodhi Gardens, New Delhi. The couple has a daughter, Ineka Tewari.

== Career ==
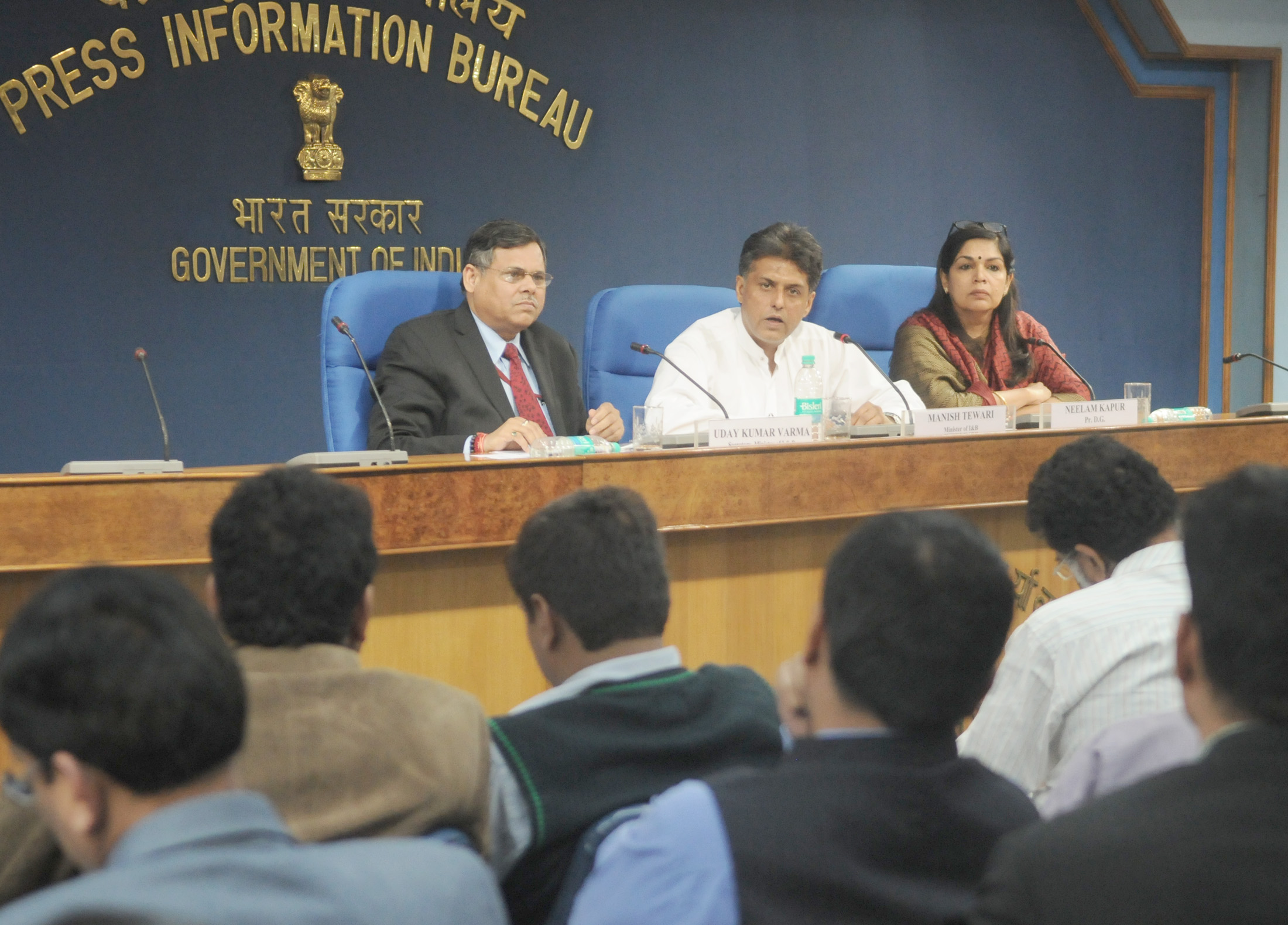
Manish Tewari addressing a Press Conference on ‘Digitization and related issues’, in New Delhi.

Tewari was the president of National Students Union of India from 1988 to 1993 and Indian Youth Congress(I) from 1998 to 2000. He lost the 2004 Lok sabha elections but successfully contested the 2009 Lok Sabha elections by defeating Shiromani Akali Dal's candidate Gurcharan Singh Galib by a margin of over 100,000 votes. In the 2012 Indian Cabinet reshuffle he was made Union Minister for Information and Broadcasting. Tewari, an advocate by profession, presently practices in the Supreme Court of India and the High Courts of Delhi as well as Punjab and Haryana.

As a member of parliament he has been active in drafting a Private member's Bill to bring the intelligence agencies under parliamentary oversight. While he was scheduled to contest polls from his constituency Ludhiana, in March 2014 he was admitted to hospital for heart ailment. Days later he expressed his unwillingness to contest parliamentary elections owing to his ill health. He has been replaced by Ravneet Singh Bittu, the grandson of former Punjab Chief Minister Beant Singh.

Manish Tewari was a speaker at Bridge India's webinar on "India's foreign policy: Taking stock at the end of Year One". In 2022, it was reported that Tewari may be a candidate in the 2022 Indian National Congress presidential election.

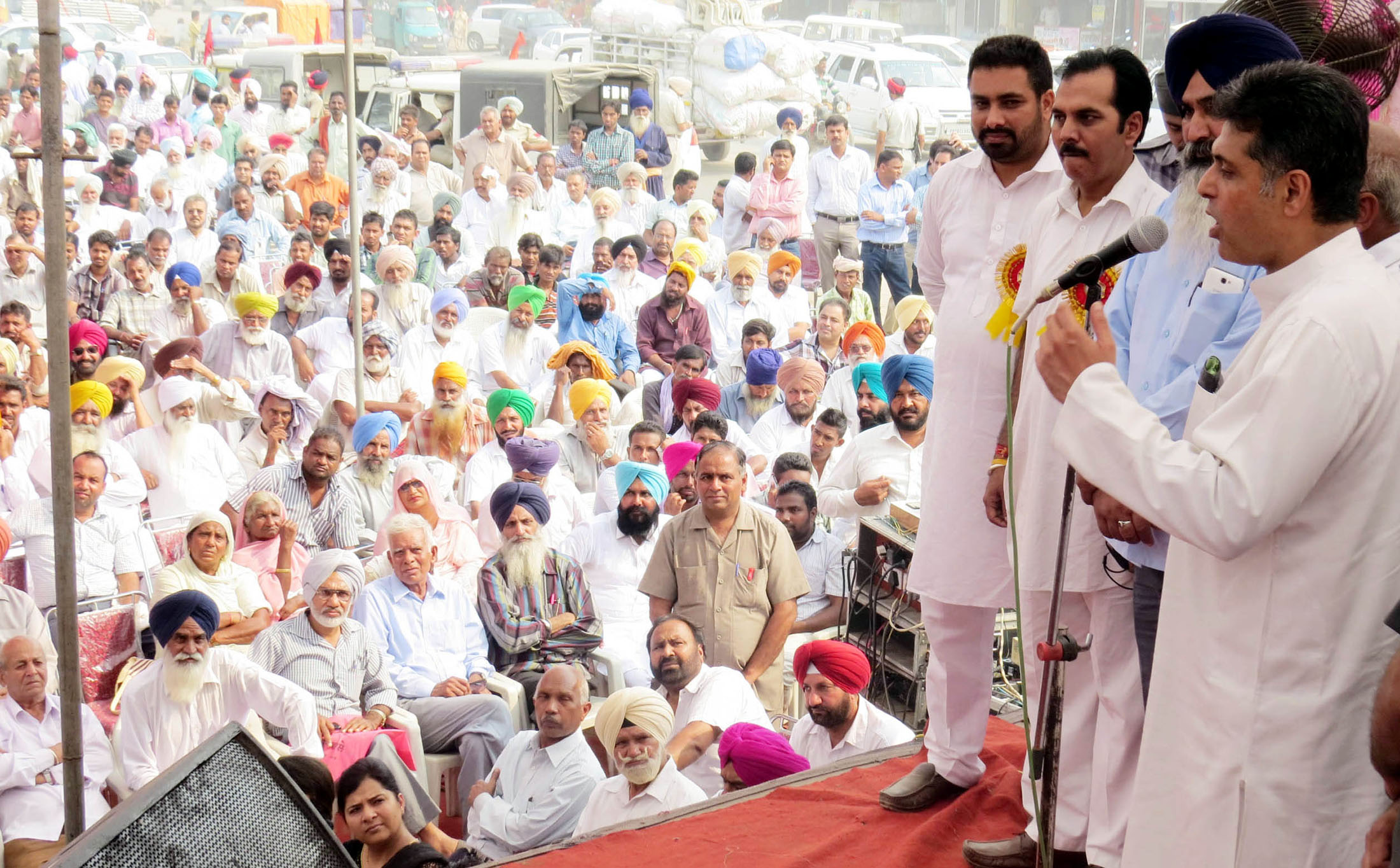
Manish Tewari addressing the gathering, at Mullanpur, District. Ludhiana of Punjab on 23 October 2013
