= Jalandhar Lok Sabha constituency =

Lok Sabha Constituency in Punjab

Coordinates: 31.3°N 75.6°E

Jalandhar PB-4
- Lok Sabha constituency
- Interactive Map Outlining Jalandhar Lok Sabha constituency

Constituency details
- Country: India
- State: Punjab
- Assembly constituencies: Phillaur; Nakodar; Shahkot; Kartarpur; Jalandhar West; Jalandhar Central; Jalandhar North; Jalandhar Cantt; Adampur
- Established: 1952
- Reservation: SC

Member of Parliament
- 18th Lok Sabha
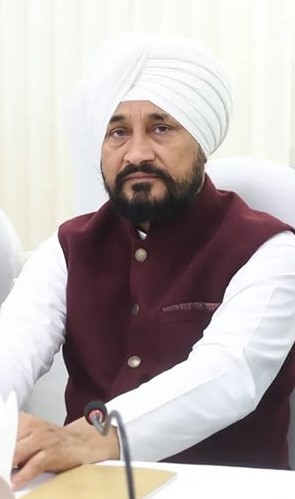
- Incumbent Charanjit Singh Channi
- Party: INC
- Alliance: INDIA
- Elected year: 2024
- Preceded by: Sushil Kumar Rinku

Jalandhar Lok Sabha constituency (formerly known as Jullundur Lok Sabha constituency) is one of the 13 Lok Sabha constituencies in Punjab state in northern India.

== Assembly segments ==
Presently, after delimitation, this constituency comprises the following nine Vidhan Sabha segments:

#	Name	District	Member	Party	Leading (in 2024)
30	Phillaur (SC)	Jalandhar	Vikramjit Singh Chaudhary	INC	INC
31	Nakodar	Jalandhar	Inderjit Kaur Mann	AAP	INC
32	Shahkot	Jalandhar	Hardev Singh Laddi	INC	INC
33	Kartarpur (SC)	Jalandhar	Balkar Singh	AAP	INC
34	Jalandhar West (SC)	Jalandhar	Mohinder Bhagat	AAP	INC
35	Jalandhar Central	Jalandhar	Raman Arora	AAP	BJP
36	Jalandhar North	Jalandhar	Avtar Singh Junior	INC	BJP
37	Jalandhar Cantt	Jalandhar	Pargat Singh	INC	INC
38	Adampur (SC)	Jalandhar	Sukhwinder Singh Kotli	INC	INC

=== Old assembly segments ===
Before delimitation of the parliamentary constituencies in 2008, this constituency comprised the following nine Vidhan Sabha (Legislative Assembly) segments:

1. Jullundur Cantonment
2. Jullundur North
3. Jullundur Central
4. Jullundur South
5. Kartarpur
6. Lohian
7. Nakodar
8. Kapurthala
9. Sultanpur

== Members of Parliament ==
Most Successful parties from Jalandhar Lok Sabha
1. INC (15 Times) (75.0%)
2. SAD (2 Times) (10.0%)
3. Janata Dal (2 Times) (10.0%)
4. INC (I) (1 Time) (5.00%)

Year	Member	Party
1952	Amar Nath	Indian National Congress
1957	Swaran Singh	Indian National Congress
1962	Swaran Singh	Indian National Congress
1967	Swaran Singh	Indian National Congress
1969^	Swaran Singh	Indian National Congress
1971	Swaran Singh	Indian National Congress
1977	Iqbal Singh Dhillon	Shiromani Akali Dal
1980	Rajinder Singh Sparrow	Indian National Congress (I)
1984	Rajinder Singh Sparrow	Indian National Congress
1989	Inder Kumar Gujral	Janata Dal
1992	Yash	Indian National Congress
1993^	Umrao Singh	Indian National Congress
1996	Darbara Singh	Shiromani Akali Dal
1998	Inder Kumar Gujral	Janata Dal
1999	Balbir Singh	Indian National Congress
2004	Rana Gurjeet Singh	Indian National Congress
2009	Mohinder S. Kaypee	Indian National Congress
2014	Santokh Singh Chaudhary	Indian National Congress
2019	Santokh Singh Chaudhary	Indian National Congress
2023^	Sushil Kumar Rinku	Aam Aadmi Party
2024	Charanjit Singh Channi	Indian National Congress

^denotes by-polls

== Election results ==
=== 2024 ===
2024 Indian general election: Jalandhar
Party	Candidate	Votes	%	±%
INC	Charanjit Singh Channi	390,053	39.43	▲11.99
BJP	Sushil Kumar Rinku	214,060	21.64	▲6.46
AAP	Pawan Kumar Tinu	208,889	21.12	▼12.93
SAD	Mohinder Singh Kaypee	67,911	6.87	▼10.98
BSP	Balwinder Kumar	64,941	6.57	New
SAD(A)	Sarabjit Singh Khalsa	19,284	1.95	▼0.34
CPI(M)	Purshottam Lal Bilga	5,958	0.6	New
Majority		175,993	17.79	▲11.18
Turnout		989,107	59.70	▲5.00
INC gain from AAP		Swing	▲11.99	

=== 2023 by-election ===
2023 Lok Sabha by-election: Jalandhar
Party	Candidate	Votes	%	±%
AAP	Sushil Kumar Rinku	302,279	34.05	▲31.55
INC	Karamjit Kaur Chaudhary	243,588	27.44	▼10.46
SAD	Dr.Sukhwinder Kumar Sukhi	158,445	17.85	▼18.05
BJP	Inder Iqbal Singh Atwal	134,800	15.18	New entry
SAD(A)	Gurjant Singh Kattu	20,366	2.29	New entry
NOTA	None of the Above	6,661	0.75	▼0.46
Majority		58,691	6.61	▲4.70
Turnout		887,626	54.70	▼8.34
AAP gain from INC		Swing		

=== 2019 ===
2019 Indian general elections: Jalandhar
Party	Candidate	Votes	%	±%
INC	Santokh Singh Chaudhary	385,712	37.90	▲1.34
SAD	Charanjit Singh Atwal	366,221	35.90	▲6.16
BSP	Balwinder Kumar	204,783	20.10	▲15.59
AAP	Justice (Retd.) Jora Singh	25,467	2.50	▼21.92
NOTA	None of the above	12,324	1.21	N/A
Majority		19,491	1.91	▼4.91
Turnout		1,019,403	63.04	▼4.04
INC hold		Swing	▲1.34	

=== 2014 ===
2014 Indian general elections: Jalandhar
Party	Candidate	Votes	%	±%
INC	Santokh Singh Chaudhary	380,479	36.56	▼8.78
SAD	Pawan Kumar Tinu	309,498	29.74	▼11.55
AAP	Jyoti Mann	254,121	24.42	New
BSP	Sukhwinder Singh Kotli	46,914	4.51	▼5.89
IND	Darshan Nahar	10,074	0.97	N/A
Majority		70,981	6.82	▲2.77
Turnout		1,040,778	67.08	▼0.07
INC hold		Swing	▼8.78	

=== 2009 ===
2009 Indian general elections: Jalandhar
Party	Candidate	Votes	%	±%
INC	Mohinder Singh Kaypee	408,103	45.34	
SAD	Hans Raj Hans	371,658	41.29	
BSP	Surjit Singh	93,592	10.40	
IND	Rakesh Kumar Bhagat	5,303	0.59	
IND	Hans Raj Pabwan	4,070	0.45	
Majority		36,445	4.05	
Turnout		899,691	67.15	
INC hold		Swing		

=== 1998 ===
1998 Indian general election: Jalandhar
Party	Candidate	Votes	%	±%
JD	I.K. Gujral	380,785		
INC	Umrao Singh	2,49,769		
BSP	Baldev Singh	5,693		
Independent	Gurdev Singh	3,160		
Majority		1,31,016		
Turnout		6,50,836		
JD gain from SAD		Swing		

== See also ==
- 2022 Punjab Legislative Assembly election
- Jalandhar district
- List of constituencies of the Lok Sabha
