= Mohinder Singh Kaypee =

Indian politician

Member of Parliament
- In office 2009 - 2014
- Succeeded by: Santokh Singh Choudhary
- Constituency: Jalandhar

Personal details
- Born: 7 November 1956 (age 69)
- Party: Shiromani Akali Dal (2024- Present)
- Other political affiliations: Indian National Congress (till 2024)
- Relations: Amarjit Kaypee (Brother)
- Parent: Darshan Singh Kaypee

Mohinder Singh Kaypee, is an Indian politician and member of Shiromani Akali Dal. Before, he was politically affiliated with the Indian National Congress. He is a Shiromani Akali Dal Candidate for Jalandhar Lok Sabha constituency for the 2024 Indian general election.

== Early life ==
Mohinder Singh Kaypee was born into a Ravidassia family to Darshan Singh Kaypee and Karan Kaur.

Kaypee completed B.A L.L.B from Panjab University, Chandigarh and he is one of the prominent Dalit leaders in the Doaba region. He remained minister in the 1992 and 1995 Congress governments and was elected MP for the Jalandhar Lok Sabha seat in 2009 and unsuccessfully fought for the Hoshiarpur Lok Sabha constituency in 2014.Kaypee has been elected as a Punjab State legislator three times—in 1985, 1992, and 2002—from the Jalandhar South assembly seat.Kaypee has a rich political legacy, and he is a second-generation politician. His father, Darshan Singh Kaypee, was a five-time MLA from Jalandhar who was killed by the militants in 1992.Mohinder Singh Kaypee's daughter is married to the nephew of senior Congress leader Charanjit Singh Channi, who is the party's candidate from the Jalandhar Lok Sabha seat as well.

== Politics ==
- In 2009, he became Member of Parliament from Jalandhar (Lok Sabha constituency). But in 2014 Parliamentary elections he lost to BJP candidate, Vijay Sampla from Hoshiarpur.
- He is a three-terms MLA and served as Minister of State for Sports and Youth in 1992, Education and Transport in 1995.
- He was former president of the Punjab Pradesh Congress Committee (PPCC).
- Chairman of the Punjab State Board of Technical Education and Industrial Training.
