= Darshan Singh Kaypee =

Indian politician

Darshan Singh Kaypee was a leader of Indian National Congress from Punjab, India. He was a member of Punjab Legislative Assembly elected for five times from Jalandhar. He was assassinated by Kharku militants in 1992.
