= Malwinder Singh Kang =

Indian politician

Malvinder Singh Kang

Member of Parliament, Lok Sabha
- Incumbent
- Assumed office 4 June 2024
- Preceded by: Manish Tewari
- Constituency: Anandpur Sahib

Personal details
- Party: Aam Aadmi Party

Malvinder Singh Kang is an Indian Politician, currently representing as the Member of Parliament for the Anandpur Sahib Lok Sabha constituency.

Kang is a member and chief spokesperson of Aam Aadmi Party for Punjab.

== Early life and education ==
Kang was born in Rayatpura Distt. Bhind in Madhya Pradesh. He completed his higher education at Panjab University, Chandigarh and earned a Master of Arts in History in 2002 and LLB. He is also a National Level Basketball Player.

Originally active in Bharatiya Janata Party in Punjab (including as state general secretary and spokesperson), he resigned in 2020 in protest against the farm laws and joined AAP in 2021.

As an MP and party spokesperson, Kang has been involved in political and public issues, including, Advocating for infrastructure improvements and civic issues in towns like Kharar., Voicing concerns on educational governance and local university matters, Opposing policies seen as adverse to Punjab’s interests, Commenting on national legislation and policy debates in Parliament. Professionally, he is trained as an advocate (lawyer).

== Political career ==
Malvinder Singh Kang contested the 2024 Lok Sabha election as a candidate of the Aam Aadmi Party and elected as a Member of Parliament from Anandpur Sahib Lok Sabha constituency.

Raised concerns related to farmers’ income security, MSP framework, and post–farm-law agrarian reforms. He Also Spoke on issues affecting Punjab’s agrarian economy, including debt relief and crop diversification.

Kang Voiced strong positions on Centre–State relations, particularly matters impacting Punjab’s administrative and financial rights and Raised objections to policies perceived as encroaching on state autonomy.

He Highlighted issues related to universities, students, and youth employment. Also Spoke on governance and funding challenges in higher education institutions.

Kang Raised questions on road, rail, and civic infrastructure in Punjab, especially in semi-urban and border areas. He Advocated for faster execution of central projects in his constituency.

Kang Participated in debates on legislative bills, emphasizing constitutional values, transparency, and public accountability.

== Election results ==
2024 Indian general election: Anandpur Sahib
Party	Candidate	Votes	%	±%
AAP	Malwinder Singh Kang	313,217	29.08	▲24.18
INC	Vijay Inder Singla	302,371	28.07	▼11.5
BJP	Subhash Sharma	186,578	17.32	New entry
SAD	Prem Singh Chandumajra	117,936	10.95	▼24.29
BSP	Jasvir Singh Garhi	90,157	8.37	▼5.17
SAD(A)	Khushalpal Singh Mann	24,831	2.31	New
NOTA	None of the Above	6,402	0.59	▼0.99
Majority		10,846	1.01	▼1.15
Turnout		1,077,123		
AAP gain from INC		Swing	▲24.18	
