= Anandpur Sahib Lok Sabha constituency =

Lok Sabha Constituency in Punjab, India

Coordinates: 31.24°N 76.5°E

Anandpur Sahib PB-6
- Lok Sabha constituency
- Interactive Map Outlining Anandpur Sahib Lok Sabha constituency

Constituency details
- Country: India
- State: Punjab
- Assembly constituencies: Garhshankar; Banga; Nawan Shahr; Balachaur; Ananadpur Sahib; Rupnagar; Chamkaur Sahib; Kharar; S.A.S. Nagar
- Established: 2008
- Reservation: None

Member of Parliament
- 18th Lok Sabha
- Incumbent Malwinder Singh Kang
- Party: AAP
- Alliance: None
- Elected year: 2024
- Preceded by: Manish Tewari

Anandpur Sahib Lok Sabha constituency is one of the 13 Lok Sabha (parliamentary) constituencies of the Indian state of Punjab. This constituency came into existence as a part of the implementation of delimitation of parliamentary and assembly constituencies in 2008.

== Assembly segments ==
The nine Vidhan Sabha (legislative assembly) segments of Anandpur Sahib Lok Sabha constituency are:

#	Name	District	Member	Party	Leading (in 2024)
45	Garhshankar	Hoshiarpur	Jai Krishan Singh	AAP	AAP
46	Banga (SC)	SBS Nagar	Sukhwinder Kumar Sukhi	AAP	AAP
47	Nawan Shahr	SBS Nagar	Nachhatar Pal	BSP	AAP
48	Balachaur	SBS Nagar	Santosh Kataria	AAP	INC
49	Anandpur Sahib	Rupnagar	Harjot Singh Bains	AAP	AAP
50	Rupnagar	Rupnagar	Dinesh Chadha	AAP	AAP
51	Chamkaur Sahib (SC)	Rupnagar	Dr. Charanjit Singh	AAP	INC
52	Kharar	Mohali	Anmol Gagan Maan	AAP	INC
53	S.A.S. Nagar	Mohali	Kulwant Singh	AAP	INC

Before delimitation, Banga and Nawan Shahr assembly segments of this Lok Sabha constituency were in the Phillaur constituency, Chamkaur Sahib and Kharar assembly segments were in Ropar constituency and Garhshankar, Balachaur and Anandpur Sahib assembly segments were in Hoshiarpur constituency. S.A.S. Nagar assembly segment was created as a part of delimitation of assembly constituencies in 2008.

== Members of Parliament ==
Year	Member	Party
Till 2008 : Constituency did not exist
2009	Ravneet Singh Bittu	Indian National Congress
2014	Prem Singh Chandumajra	Shiromani Akali Dal
2019	Manish Tewari	Indian National Congress
2024	Malwinder Singh Kang	Aam Aadmi Party

== Election results ==
=== 2024 ===
2024 Indian general election: Anandpur Sahib
Party	Candidate	Votes	%	±%
AAP	Malwinder Singh Kang	313,217	29.08	▲24.18
INC	Vijay Inder Singla	302,371	28.07	▼11.5
BJP	Subhash Sharma	186,578	17.32	New entry
SAD	Prem Singh Chandumajra	117,936	10.95	▼24.29
BSP	Jasvir Singh Garhi	90,157	8.37	▼5.17
SAD(A)	Khushalpal Singh Mann	24,831	2.31	New
NOTA	None of the Above	6,402	0.59	▼0.99
Majority		10,846	1.01	▼1.15
Turnout		1,077,123		
AAP gain from INC		Swing	▲24.18	

=== 2019 ===
2019 Indian general election: Anandpur Sahib
Party	Candidate	Votes	%	±%
INC	Manish Tewari	427,955	39.57	▲10.20
SAD	Prem Singh Chandumajra	381,161	35.24	▲3.30
BSP	Vikramjeet Singh Sodhi	146,441	13.54	▲7.18
AAP	Narinder Singh Shergill	53,052	4.90	▼23.24
NOTA	None of the above	17,135	1.58	▲1.03
Majority		46,884	4.33	▲2.16
Turnout		1,082,024	63.69	▼5.75
INC gain from SAD		Swing	▲3.45	

=== General elections 2014 ===
2014 Indian general elections: Anandpur Sahib
Party	Candidate	Votes	%	±%
SAD	Prem Singh Chandumajra	347,394	31.94	▼5.36
INC	Ambika Soni	323,697	29.77	▼14.96
AAP	Himmat Singh Shergill	306,008	28.14	New
BSP	K. S. Makhan	69,124	6.36	▼6.69
CPI(M)	Balbir Singh Jadla	10,483	0.96	▼0.93
NOTA	None of the Above	5,937	0.55	▲0.55
Majority		23,697	2.17	▼5.26
Turnout		1,086,563	69.44	▲1.82
SAD gain from INC		Swing		

=== General elections 2009 ===
2009 Indian general elections: Anandpur Sahib
Party	Candidate	Votes	%	±%
INC	Ravneet Singh Bittu	404,836	44.73	
SAD	Dr. Daljit Singh Cheema	3,37,632	37.30	
BSP	Kewal Krishan	1,18,088	13.05	
CPI(M)	Mahan Singh	17,147	1.89	
IND	Resham Lal Kahlon	5,582	0.62	
Majority		67,204	7.43	
Turnout		9,05,104	67.62	New
INC win (new seat)				

== See also ==
- Ropar Lok Sabha constituency
- List of constituencies of the Lok Sabha
