= Vijay Sampla =

Indian politician

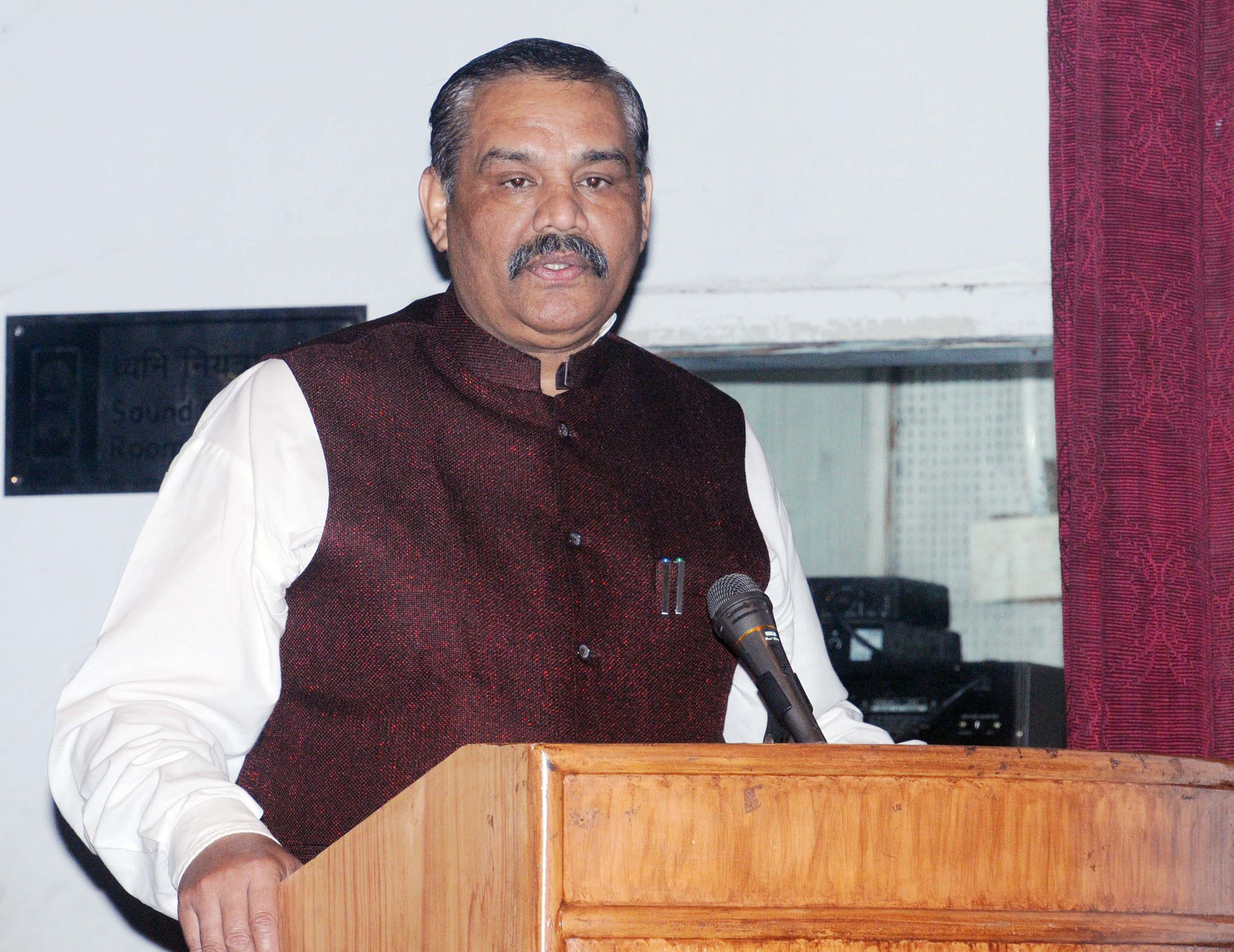

Chairman of the National Commission for Scheduled Castes
- In office 18 February 2021 – 18 July 2023
- Preceded by: Ram Shankar Katheria
- Succeeded by: Kishor Makwana

Minister of State for Social Justice and Empowerment
- In office 9 November 2014 – 24 May 2019
- Preceded by: Porika Naik Balram
- Constituency: Hoshiarpur

Personal details
- Born: 6 July 1961 (age 64) Sofi, Punjab, India
- Party: Bharatiya Janata Party
- Spouse: Sudesh Sampla
- Children: 2
- As of May, 2019

Vijay Sampla (born 6 July 1961) is an Indian politician and former chairman of the National Commission for Scheduled Castes from 2021 to 2023. He is a former Minister of State for Social Justice and Empowerment in India from 2014 to 2019 and a former member of parliament from Hoshiarpur (Lok Sabha constituency). He won the 2014 Indian general election as a Bharatiya Janata Party candidate. He did not contest the 2019 elections. Sampla, a leader from Punjab, has worked as a farm hand, a labourer and a plumber earlier in his life.

Sampla, who studied till Class 10, joined the party in 1998. He was the second cabinet minister from Punjab after Akali Dal's Harsimrat Kaur Badal. His political journey began after he was elected the Sarpanch or head of his Sofi village (Jalandhar District). He had held several key posts in the BJP's Punjab unit.

When he was a 27-year-old bereaved Dalit, Sampla was trying to find his feet against the oppressive landlords of Jalandhar's Sofi Pind. His brother and he were left to fend for themselves after their father's death and Sampla went off to Saudi Arabia in 1979 to work for a plumbing company.

On his swearing-in as BJP's first minister from Punjab in NDA-II, he said, "I often recall one incident that shaped my life. While I was in Saudi Arabian city of Damam, I was asked to clean human excreta and repair a bathroom. I was young and flatly refused to do the cleaning part while telling the building owner that I was a plumber. On my insistence, the man put on plastic gloves and cleaned the muck himself. It taught me the difference between oppression against Dalits and the will to work."
