= Patti, Punjab Assembly constituency =

Legislative Assembly constituency in Punjab State, India

Coordinates: 31.28°N 74.85°E

Patti
- Constituency No. 23 for the Punjab Legislative Assembly

Constituency details
- Country: India
- State: Punjab
- District: Tarn Taran
- Lok Sabha constituency: Khadoor Sahib
- Total electors: 202,155
- Reservation: None

Member of Legislative Assembly
- 16th Punjab Legislative Assembly
- Incumbent Laljit Singh Bhullar
- Party: Aam Aadmi Party
- Elected year: 2022

Patti Assembly constituency is one of the 117 Legislative Assembly constituencies of Punjab state in India. It is part of Tarn Taran district and includes the town of Patti, Punjab.

== Members of the Legislative Assembly ==
Most successful parties from Patti, Punjab Vidhan Sabha
1. SAD (9 Times) (56.2%)
2. INC (6 Times) (37.5%)
3. AAP (1 Time) (6.25%)

Year	Member	Party
1952	Partap Singh Kairon	Indian National Congress
1957	Narain Singh	Indian National Congress
1962	Hazara Singh	Shiromani Akali Dal
1967	R. Kaur	Indian National Congress
1969	Surinder Singh Kairon	Shiromani Akali Dal
1972	Surinder Singh Kairon	Indian National Congress
1977	Niranjan Singh	Shiromani Akali Dal
1980	Niranjan Singh	Shiromani Akali Dal
1985	Niranjan Singh	Shiromani Akali Dal
1992	Sakhwinder Singh	Indian National Congress
1997	Adesh Partap Singh Kairon	Shiromani Akali Dal
2002	Adesh Partap Singh Kairon	Shiromani Akali Dal
2007	Adesh Partap Singh Kairon	Shiromani Akali Dal
2012	Adesh Partap Singh Kairon	Shiromani Akali Dal
2017	Harminder Singh Gill	Indian National Congress
2022	Laljit Singh Bhullar	Aam Aadmi Party

== Election results ==
=== 2027 ===
Punjab Assembly election, 2027: Patti
Party	Candidate	Votes	%	±%
AAP				
AD (WPD)				New entry
INC				
BSP				
SAD				
BJP				New entry
NOTA	None of the above			
Majority				
Turnout				

=== 2022 ===
Punjab Assembly election, 2022: Patti
Party	Candidate	Votes	%	±%
AAP	Laljit Singh Bhullar	57,323	39.55	
SAD	Adesh Partap Singh Kairon	46,324	31.96	
INC	Harminder Singh Gill	33,009	22.78	
SAD(A)	Dilbag Singh Sheron	4,055	2.82	
PLC	Jaskaran Toot Gill	459	0.32	
NOTA	None of the above	1,079	7.6	
Majority		10,999	7.59	
Turnout		144,922	70.9	
Registered electors		204,395		
AAP gain from INC				

=== 2017 ===
Punjab Assembly election, 2017: Patti
Party	Candidate	Votes	%	±%
INC	Harminder Singh Gill	64,617	45.68	
SAD	Adesh Partap Singh Kairon	56,254	39.43	
AAP	Ranjit Singh Cheema	18,489	12.96	
BSP	Avtar Singh	762	0.53	
Independent	Kartar Singh	577	0.39	
Independent	Harjinder Singh	547	0.38	
Independent	Sukhwant Singh Virdi Chuslewar	477	0.33	
SAD(A)	Bhupinder Singh	470	0.33	
BSP (A)	Jatinder Singh Pannu	462	0.32	
NOTA	None of the Above	758	0.40	
Majority		8,363	5.9	
Turnout		1,42,655	75.5	
Registered electors		189,850		

== See also ==
- List of constituencies of the Punjab Legislative Assembly
- Tarn Taran district
