= Ravneet Singh Bittu =

Indian politician

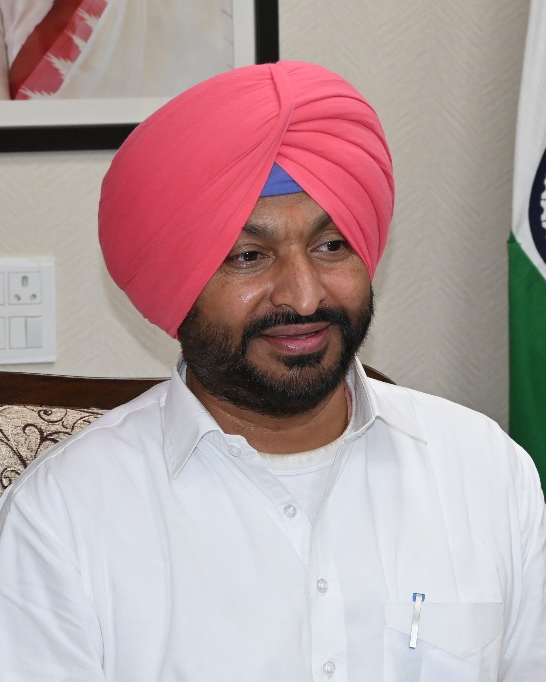

Minister of State for Railways Minister of State for Food Processing Industries
- In office 11 June 2024 – 24 July 2026
- Prime Minister: Narendra Modi
- Minister: Ashwini Vaishnaw (Minister of Railways); Chirag Paswan (Minister of FPI)

Member of Parliament, Rajya Sabha
- In office 27 August 2024 – 21 June 2026
- Preceded by: K. C. Venugopal
- Succeeded by: Alka Gurjar
- Constituency: Rajasthan

Leader of Indian National Congress in Lok Sabha
- In office 11 March 2021 – 18 July 2021
- Speaker: Om Birla
- Preceded by: Adhir Ranjan Chowdhury
- Succeeded by: Adhir Ranjan Chowdhury

Member of Parliament, Lok Sabha
- In office 16 May 2014 – 4 June 2024
- Preceded by: Manish Tewari
- Succeeded by: Amrinder Singh
- Constituency: Ludhiana
- In office 16 May 2009 – 16 May 2014
- Preceded by: New constituency
- Succeeded by: Prem Singh Chandumajra
- Constituency: Anandpur Sahib

Personal details
- Born: 10 September 1975 (age 50) Ludhiana, Punjab, India
- Party: Bharatiya Janata Party (2024–present)
- Other political affiliations: Indian National Congress (until 2024)
- Spouse: Anupama Jhajj
- Occupation: Agriculturist

Ravneet Singh Bittu is an Indian politician from Punjab who served as the Minister of State for Railways and as the Minister of State for Food Processing Industries from 2024 till 2026 as a member of the Bharatiya Janata Party.

== Political career ==
He was first elected to the Lok Sabha in the 2009 Indian general election, representing Anandpur Sahib for the Indian National Congress (INC). He would be reelected in the 2014 and 2019 Indian general elections from Ludhiana. In 2021, he served as the INC's leader in the Lok Sabha. He has sought election to the Punjab Legislative Assembly from Jalalabad in 2017, losing to Sukhbir Singh Badal.

In January 2021, he was assaulted at the Singhu border during a Jan Sansad program. In 2023, he received a bomb threat via a WhatsApp call.

Prior to the 2024 Indian general election, Bittu joined the Bharatiya Janata Party on March 24, 2024. He lost to Amrinder Singh Raja Warring in Ludhiana, but was appointed to the third Modi ministry as Minister of State for Railways and as the Minister of State for Food Processing Industries. He was later elected to the Rajya Sabha from Rajasthan between 2024 to 2026.

He is the grandson of former Punjab Chief Minister Beant Singh.

== Election results ==
=== Lok Sabha ===
Year	Constituency	Party	Votes	%	Opponent	Opponent Party	Opponent Votes	%	Result	Margin	%
2024	Ludhiana	BJP	301,282	28.5	Amrinder Singh Raja Warring	INC	322,224	30.42	Lost	-20,942	-1.92
2019	Ludhiana	INC	383,795	36.66	Simarjit Singh Bains	LIP	307,423	29.36	Won	76,372	7.3
2014	Ludhiana	INC	300,459	27.27	Harvinder Singh Phoolka	AAP	260,750	25.48	Won	39,709	1.79
2009	Anandpur Sahib	INC	404,836	44.73	Dr. Daljit Singh Cheema	SAD	337,632	37.3	Won	67,204	7.43

=== Punjab Legislative Assembly ===
Year	Constituency	Party	Votes	%	Opponent	Opponent Party	Opponent Votes	%	Result	Margin	%
2017	Jalalabad	INC	31,539	18.78	Sukhbir Singh Badal	SAD	75,110	44.82	Lost	-43,571	-26.04

== Timeline of Positions and Committees ==
Timeline of Positions and Committees
- 2009 - 2014
  - Position: Member
  - Committee: Standing Committee on Home Affairs
- 1 Sep. 2014 - 25 May 2019
  - Position: Member
  - Committees:
    - Standing Committee on Petroleum and Natural Gas
    - Consultative Committee, Ministry of Consumer Affairs, Food & Public Distribution
    - Indian Council of Agricultural Research Society
- 1 May 2017 - 25 May 2019
  - Position: Member
  - Committee: Committee on Public Undertakings
- 24 July 2019 - 4 June 2024
  - Position: Member
  - Committee: Committee on Public Undertakings
- 13 Sep. 2019 - 4 June 2024
  - Position: Member
  - Committee: Standing Committee on Home Affairs
- 9 Oct. 2019 - 4 June 2024
  - Position: Chairperson
  - Committee: Committee on Absence of Members from the Sittings of the House
- 21 Nov 2019 - 4 June 2024
  - Position: Member
  - Committees:
    - General Purposes Committee, Lok Sabha
    - Consultative Committee, Ministry of Micro, Small and Medium Enterprises

== See also ==
- Third Modi ministry

Lok Sabha
Preceded by Constituency did not exist	Member of Parliament for Anandpur Sahib; 2009 – 2014	Succeeded by Prem Singh Chandumajra
Preceded by Manish Tewari	Member of Parliament for Ludhiana; 2014 – 2024	Succeeded by Amrinder Singh Raja Warring
Party political offices
Preceded by Adhir Ranjan Chowdhury	Leader of the Indian National Congress in the Lok Sabha; 11 March 2021 – 18 July 2021	Succeeded by Adhir Ranjan Chowdhury
