= Paramjit Kaur Gulshan =

Indian politician

Member of Parliament for Faridkot
- In office 2009–2014
- Preceded by: Sukhbir Singh Badal
- Succeeded by: Sadhu Singh

Member of Parliament for Bathinda
- In office 2004–2009
- Preceded by: Bhan Singh Bhaura
- Succeeded by: Harsimrat Kaur Badal

Personal details
- Born: 4 January 1949 (age 77) Akali Jalal, Punjab
- Party: SAD (S)
- Spouse: Nirmal Singh
- Children: 2 daughters
- As of 22 September, 2006

Paramjit Kaur Gulshan (born 4 January 1949) is an Indian former member of parliament who represented Faridkot and is a member of the Shiromani Akali Dal (Sanyukt). She represented Bathinda in the 14th Lok Sabha.

== Early life ==
She was born in Akali Jalal, Bathinda district to S. Dhanna Singh Gulshan and Basant Gulshan in 1949, and married Nirmal Singh (who has served as judge of Punjab and Haryana high court and is presently member of legislative assembly, Bassi Pathana, Punjab) in 1978. She graduated with a M.A. from Punjab University and a B.Ed. from Guru Nanak Dev University.
