= Faridkot Lok Sabha constituency =

Coordinates: 30.68°N 74.75°E

Faridkot PB-9
- Lok Sabha constituency
- Interactive Map Outlining Faridkot Lok Sabha constituency

Constituency details
- Country: India
- State: Punjab
- Assembly constituencies: Nihal Singhwala; Bhagha Purana; Moga; Dharamkot; Gidderbaha; Faridkot; Kotkapura; Jaitu; Rampura Phul
- Established: 1977
- Reservation: SC

Member of Parliament
- 18th Lok Sabha
- Incumbent Sarabjeet Singh Khalsa
- Party: AD (WPD)
- Alliance: None
- Elected year: 2024
- Preceded by: Muhammad Sadique

Faridkot is one of the 13 Lok Sabha (parliamentary) constituencies in Punjab state in northern India.

== Assembly segments ==
Presently, Faridkot Lok Sabha constituency comprises the following nine Vidhan Sabha (legislative assembly) segments:

#	Name	District	Member	Party	Leading (in 2024)
71	Nihal Singhwala (SC)	Moga	Manjit Singh Bilaspur	AAP	IND
72	Bhagha Purana	Moga	Amritpal Singh Sukhanand	AAP	IND
73	Moga	Moga	Amandeep Kaur Arora	AAP	IND
74	Dharamkot	Moga	Devinder Singh Laddi Dhos	AAP	IND
84	Giddarbaha	Sri Muktsar Sahib	Hardeep Singh Dimpy Dhillon	AAP	IND
87	Faridkot	Faridkot	Gurdit Singh Sekhon	AAP	AAP
88	Kotkapura	Faridkot	Kultar Singh Sandhwan	AAP	AAP
89	Jaitu (SC)	Faridkot	Amolak Singh	AAP	IND
90	Rampura Phul	Bathinda	Balkar Singh Sidhu	AAP	IND

== Members of Parliament ==
Most Successful parties from Faridkot Lok Sabha
1. SAD (6 Times) (46.2%)
2. INC (3 Times) (23.1%)
3. SAD (A) (1 Time) (7.69%)
4. AAP (1 Time) (7.69%)
5. INC (I) (1 Time) (7.69%)
6. IND (1 Time) (7.69%)

Year	Member	Party
1952-76 : Constituency did not exist
1977	Parkash Singh Badal	Shiromani Akali Dal
1980	Gurbinder Kaur Brar	Indian National Congress
1984	Bhai Shaminder Singh	Shiromani Akali Dal
1989	Jagdev Singh Khudian	Shiromani Akali Dal (A)
1991	Jagmeet Singh Brar	Indian National Congress
1996	Sukhbir Singh Badal	Shiromani Akali Dal
1998	Sukhbir Singh Badal	Shiromani Akali Dal
1999	Jagmeet Singh Brar	Indian National Congress
2004	Sukhbir Singh Badal	Shiromani Akali Dal
2009	Paramjit Kaur Gulshan	Shiromani Akali Dal
2014	Sadhu Singh	Aam Aadmi Party
2019	Muhammad Sadiq	Indian National Congress
2024	Sarabjeet Singh Khalsa	Independent

== Election results ==
Vote share of Winning candidates
2024	29.38%
2019	42.98%
2014	43.66%
2009	49.19%
2004	53.29%
1999	48.00%
1998	50.77%
1996	39.03%
1992	58.60%
1989	48.63%
1985	51.09%
1980	50.43%
1977	59.20%

=== 2024 ===
2024 Indian general election: Faridkot
Party	Candidate	Votes	%	±%
IND	Sarabjeet Singh Khalsa	298,062	29.38	New
AAP	Karamjit Anmol	228,009	22.48	▲10.65
INC	Amarjit Kaur Sahoke	160,357	15.81	▼27.17
SAD	Rajwinder Singh	138,251	13.63	▼20.81
BJP	Hans Raj Hans	123,533	12.18	New
NOTA	None of the Above	4,143	0.41	▼1.56
Majority		70,053	6.91	▼1.63
Turnout		1,014,455	63.64	▲0.39
Independent gain from INC		Swing		

=== 2019 ===
2019 Indian general elections: Faridkot
Party	Candidate	Votes	%	±%
INC	Muhammad Sadiq	419,065	42.98	▲18.64
SAD	Gulzar Singh Ranike	335,809	34.44	▲7.49
AAP	Prof. Sadhu Singh	115,319	11.83	▼31.83
PEP	Baldev Singh Jaito	43,932	4.51	New
NOTA	None of the above	19,246	1.97	N/A
Majority		83,056	8.54	▼8.17
Turnout		975,242	63.25	▼7.70
INC gain from AAP		Swing		

=== 2014 ===
2014 Indian general elections: Faridkot
Party	Candidate	Votes	%	±%
AAP	Prof. Sadhu Singh	450,751	43.66	New
SAD	Paramjit Kaur Gulshan	278,235	26.95	▼22.24
INC	Joginder Singh	251,222	24.34	▼18.18
CPI	Kashmir Singh	14,573	1.41	▼0.68
BSP	Sant Ram	8,282	0.80	▼2.91
Majority		172,516	16.71	▲10.04
Turnout		1,032,345	70.95	▼1.34
AAP gain from SAD		Swing	▲32.95	

=== 2009 ===
2009 Indian general elections: Faridkot
Party	Candidate	Votes	%	±%
SAD	Paramjit Kaur Gulshan	457,734	49.19	
INC	Sukhwinder Singh Danny	395,692	42.52	
BSP	Resham Singh	34,479	3.71	
CPI	Kaushalya Chaman Bhaura	19,459	2.09	
IND	Veerpaul Kaur	6,720	0.72	
Majority		62,042	6.67	
Turnout		9,31,144	72.29	
SAD hold		Swing		

=== 2004 ===
2004 Indian general election: Faridkot
Party	Candidate	Votes	%	±%
SAD	Sukhbir Singh Badal	475,928	53.29	▲5.88
INC	Karan Kaur Brar	340,649	38.14	▼9.86
BSP	Sant Ram	45,207	5.06	New entry
SAD(A)	Gurlal Singh	10,857	1.22	New entry
Independent	Harmail Singh	7,501	0.84	Steady
LJP	Nirmal Singh	4,448	0.50	New entry
SS	Navneet Kumar	3,064	0.34	New entry
Independent	Sukhbir Singh	2,735	0.31	Steady
MB(S)P	Kulwant Singh	1,675	0.19	New entry
JD(S)	Ashok Kumar	1,080	0.12	New entry
Majority		135,279	15.15	▲14.56
Turnout				
SAD gain from INC		Swing		

=== 1999 ===
1999 Indian general election: Faridkot
Party	Candidate	Votes	%	±%
INC	Jagmeet Singh Brar	418,454	48.00	▲1.27
SAD	Sukhbir Singh Badal	413,306	47.41	▼3.36
Independent	Rajinder Kumar Sharma	13,673	1.57	Steady
RPI	Sukhdev Singh Pandhi	4,386	0.50	▲0.31
BSP (A)	Devi Dass Nahar	1,146	0.13	New entry
RJD	Jogesh Kumar	849	0.10	New entry
BMP(AI)	Mittpal Singh	338	0.04	New entry
Independent	7 Independent Candidates	19,544	2.25	Steady
Majority		5,148	0.59	▼3.45
Turnout		871,755	71.19	▼1.48
INC gain from SAD		Swing		

=== 1998 ===
1998 Indian general election: Faridkot
Party	Candidate	Votes	%	±%
SAD	Sukhbir Singh Badal	439,749	50.77	▲11.74
INC	Jagmeet Singh Brar	404,790	46.73	▲12.53
Independent	Avtar Singh	13,568	1.57	Steady
Independent	Sukhpal Singh	5,341	0.62	Steady
Independent	Sukhbvir Singh	2,695	0.31	Steady
Majority		34,959	4.04	▼0.79
Turnout		873,572	72.67	▲0.66
SAD hold		Swing		

=== 1996 ===
1996 Indian general election: Faridkot
Party	Candidate	Votes	%	±%
SAD	Sukhbir Singh Badal	305,669	39.03	▲30.60
INC	Kanwaljeet Kaur	267,811	34.20	▼24.40
Independent	Jagmeet Singh	193,441	24.70	Steady
RPI	Hansa Singh	1,460	0.19	▼1.86
Independent	13 Independent Candidates	14,691	1.88	Steady
Majority		37,858	4.83	▼26.58
Turnout		799,077	72.01	▲46.29
SAD gain from INC		Swing		

=== 1992 ===
1992 Indian general election: Faridkot
Party	Candidate	Votes	%	±%
INC	Jagmeet Singh	144,958	58.60	▲35.02
BSP	Baljit Singh	67,262	27.19	▲17.50
JD	Sathi Roop Lal	17,785	7.19	New entry
BJP	Raj Kumar Girdhar	17,383	7.03	New entry
Majority		77,696	31.41	▲6.36
Turnout		258,881	25.72	▼38.62
INC gain from SAD(A)		Swing		

=== 1989 ===
1989 Indian general election: Faridkot
Party	Candidate	Votes	%	±%
SAD(A)	Jagdev Singh	305,521	48.63	New entry
INC	Harcharan Singh	148,138	23.58	▼20.80
BSP	Baljit Singh	60,879	9.69	New entry
SAD	Shaminder Singh	52,967	8.43	▼42.66
CPI	Jagrup Singh	24,038	3.83	New entry
RPI	Pritam Singh	12,878	2.05	New entry
Majority		157,383	25.05	▲18.34
Turnout		643,893	64.34	▼0.01
SAD(A) gain from SAD		Swing		

=== 1985 ===
1985 Indian general election: Faridkot
Party	Candidate	Votes	%	±%
SAD	Shaminder Singh	268,221	51.09	▲5.03
INC	Kanwaljit Kaur	232,968	44.38	New entry
Independent	Gurdev Singh	17,226	3.28	Steady
Independent	Baldev Kaur	6,544	1.25	Steady
Majority		35,253	6.71	▲2.34
Turnout		546,304	64.35	▲1.83
SAD gain from INC(I)		Swing		

=== 1980 ===
1980 Indian general election: Faridkot
Party	Candidate	Votes	%	±%
INC(I)	Gurbinder Kaur	238,659	50.43	New entry
SAD	Balwant Singh Ramoowalla	217,998	46.06	▼13.14
Independent	9 Independent Candidates	16,612	3.51	Steady
Majority		20,661	4.37	▼16.72
Turnout		483,196	62.52	▼12.87
INC(I) gain from SAD		Swing		

=== 1977 ===
1977 Indian general election: Faridkot
Party	Candidate	Votes	%	±%
SAD	Parkash Singh	282,713	59.20	New entry
INC	Avtar Singh	182,012	38.11	New entry
Independent	Jeeta Ram	9,889	2.07	Steady
Independent	Hari Chand	2,933	0.61	Steady
Majority		100,701	21.09	New entry
Turnout		487,098	75.39	New entry
SAD win (new seat)				

== See also ==
- Faridkot district
- List of constituencies of the Lok Sabha
- Moga district
