= Himmat Singh Shergill =

Indian politician and lawyer

Personal details
- Born: Amritsar
- Party: Aam Aadmi Party
- Parent: Shamsher Singh Shergill
- Education: BA, LLB
- Alma mater: Lawrence School Sanawar
- Occupation: Lawyer • Politician

Himmat Singh Shergill is an Indian politician and lawyer. He belongs to the Aam Aadmi Party.

He attended Lawrence School Sanawar, then moved to the United Kingdom to pursue a law degree. He ran for election in 2014 and 2017, but was unsuccessful. He worked as a lawyer for the Aam Aadmi Party from 2014 to 2017 before leaving politics to focus on his law career.
