= Ambika Soni =

Indian politician (born 1942)

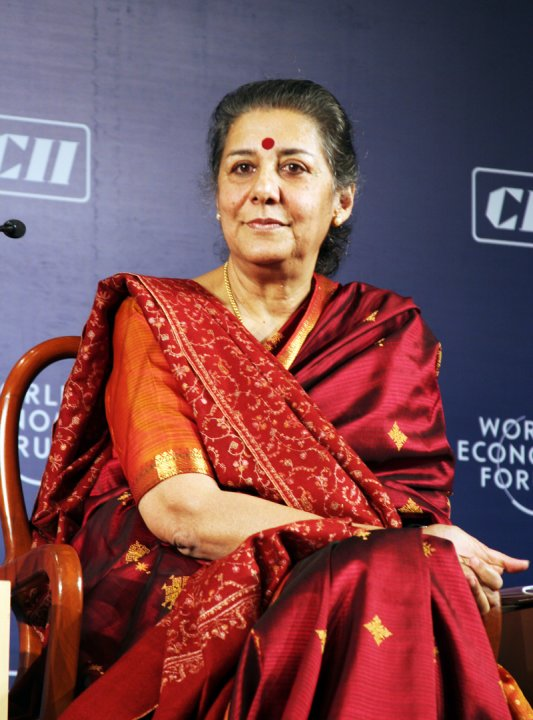

Member of Parliament, Rajya Sabha from Punjab, India
- In office March 1976 - March 1982; January 2000 - June 2004; July 2004 - July 2022

Minister of Information and Broadcasting Government of India
- In office 22 May 2009 – 27 October 2012
- Prime Minister: Manmohan Singh
- Preceded by: Priya Ranjan Dasmunsi
- Succeeded by: Manish Tewari

Minister of Tourism and Culture Government of India
- In office 29 January 2006 – 22 May 2009
- Prime Minister: Manmohan Singh
- Preceded by: Renuka Chowdhury
- Succeeded by: Kumari Selja

President of All India Mahila Congress
- In office 1998–1999

President of Indian Youth Congress
- In office 1975–1977

General Secretary of All India Congress Committee
- In office 1999–2020

Member of Congress Working Committee
- Incumbent
- Assumed office 1999

Personal details
- Born: 13 November 1942 (age 83) Lahore, Punjab, British India (now in Pakistan)
- Party: Indian National Congress
- Spouse: Uday C. Soni
- Children: 1
- Education: Indraprastha College, University of Delhi; University of Havana; Alliance Francaise; Convent Of Jesus & Mary

Ambika Soni (born 13 November 1942) is an Indian politician in the Indian National Congress. She has been Minister of Information and Broadcasting. She was a Member of Parliament representing the state of Punjab in the Rajya Sabha.

== Early life and education ==
Born in Lahore in undivided Punjab to Nakul Sen Wadhwa, an Indian Civil Service officer and Lt. Governor of Goa in 1942. Her mother, Indu Wadhwa, was a home-maker. The family is Hindu.

Ambika studied at Welham Girls School, New Delhi and did her M.A. (Hons.) from Indraprastha College, Delhi University, followed by Diploma Superiore en Langue Francaise from Alliance Francaise, Bangkok and Post-Graduate Diploma in Spanish Art and Literature from University of Havana, Cuba.

In 1961, aged 19, Ambika married Uday Soni, an Indian Foreign Service officer.

== Political career ==
=== As Member of Indian National Congress ===
Ambika Soni began her political career in 1969 when she was co-opted into the Congress Party by Indira Gandhi at the time of the Party split in 1969. Soni was an old family friend of Gandhi from the time when her father was posted as District collector of Amritsar during the Partition of India and worked very closely with Jawaharlal Nehru. In 1975 she was elected as the president of the Indian Youth Congress and worked closely with Sanjay Gandhi. In 1998, she became the president of All India Mahila Congress. From 1999 - 2006 she was General Secretary of All India Congress Committee.

=== As Member of Parliament, Rajya Sabha ===
==== Second Term (January 2000 - 10 June 2004) ====
Jan. 2000 - Feb. 2004 and Aug. 2004 - Jan. 2006	Member, Committee on Public Undertakings
Jan. 2000 - Feb. 2004	Member, Consultative Committee for the Ministry of Civil Aviation
Feb. 2000 - 2001	Member, Committee on Defence
May 2000 - June 2003	Member, House Committee
Jan. 2002 - Dec. 2003	Member, Committee on Transport, Tourism and Culture
Jan. 2003 - Feb. 2004	Member, Committee on Home Affairs

==== Third Term (July 2004 - July 2010) ====
Aug. 2004 - Jan. 2006	Member, Committee on Transport, Tourism and Culture
Oct. 2004 - Jan. 2006	Member, Consultative Committee for the Ministry of Environment and Forests
March 2005 - Jan. 2006	Member, Post-Graduate Institute of Medical Education and Research, Chandigarh

==== Fourth Term (July 2010 - July 2016) ====
Dec. 2012 - May 2014	Member, Committee on External Affairs
Dec. 2012 - May 2014	Member, Consultative Committee for the Ministry of Defence
May 2013 - May 2014	Member, Committee on Public Accounts
Sept. 2014 - May 2019	Member, Committee on Defence

==== Fifth Term (July 2016 - July 2022) ====
July 2018 - Feb. 2019	Member, Select Committee of Rajya Sabha on the Ancient Monuments and Archaeological Sites and Remains (Amendment) Bill, 2018
July 2019 - July 2022	Member, Post-Graduate Institute of Medical Education and Research, Chandigarh
Sept. 2019 - July 2022	Member, Committee on Finance
Oct. 2019 - July 2022	Member, Consultative Committee for the Ministry of Culture and Tourism

=== As Cabinet Minister ===
Date	Office held	Additional Info	Reference
29 January 2006 - 22 May 2009	Minister of Tourism and Minister of Culture	First Manmohan Singh ministry	
22 May 2009 - 27 October 2012	Minister of Information and Broadcasting	Second Manmohan Singh ministry	

== Rajya Sabha ==
Position	Party	Constituency	From	To	Tenure
Member of Parliament, Rajya Sabha (1st Term)	INC(I)	Punjab	30 March 1976	2 April 1980	4 years, 3 days
Member of Parliament, Rajya Sabha (2nd Term)	INC	NCT Delhi	28 January 2000	10 June 2004	4 years, 134 days
Member of Parliament, Rajya Sabha (3rd Term)	INC	Punjab	5 July 2004	4 July 2010	5 years, 364 days
Member of Parliament, Rajya Sabha (4th Term)	INC	Punjab	5 July 2010	4 July 2016	5 years, 365 days
Member of Parliament, Rajya Sabha (5th Term)	INC	Punjab	5 July 2016	4 July 2022	5 years, 364 days
