= Pawan Kumar Tinu =

Indian politician

MLA, Punjab
- In office 2012 - 2022
- Preceded by: New Constituency
- Constituency: Adampur

Personal details
- Party: Aam Aadmi Party
- Other party: Shiromani Akali Dal

Pawan Kumar Tinu is an Indian politician and belongs to the ruling Aam Aadmi Party. He was a member of Punjab Legislative Assembly and represented Adampur from Shiromani Akali Dal. In April 2024, he left the party to join Aam Aadmi Party and was shortly declared as the candidate for Jalandhar Lok Sabha constituency a few days after.

== Family ==
His father's name is Ram Lal Tinu. In 2017 elections, he won the Adampur assembly seat from SAD.

== Political career ==
Tinu was elected to Punjab Legislative Assembly from Adampur in 2012.
