= Khadoor Sahib Assembly constituency =

Legislative Assembly constituency in Punjab State, India

Coordinates: 31.43°N 75.1°E

Khadoor Sahib
- Constituency No. 24 for the Punjab Legislative Assembly

Constituency details
- Country: India
- State: Punjab
- District: Tarn Taran
- Lok Sabha constituency: Khadoor Sahib
- Total electors: 203,539
- Reservation: None

Member of Legislative Assembly
- 16th Punjab Legislative Assembly
- Incumbent Manjinder Singh Lalpura
- Party: Aam Aadmi Party
- Elected year: 2022

Khadoor Sahib Assembly constituency is a Punjab Legislative Assembly constituency in Tarn Taran district, Punjab state, India.

== Members of the Legislative Assembly ==
Most successful parties from Khadoor Sahib Vidhan Sabha
1. SAD (8 Times) (57.1%)
2. INC (4 Times) (28.6%)
3. AAP (1 Time) (7.14%)
4. INC (I) (1 Time) (7.14%)

Year	Member	Party
Created from Sarhali constituency
1967	Mohan Singh Nagoke	Indian National Congress
1969	Mohan Singh Nagoke	Shiromani Akali Dal
1972	Jaswant Kaur	Indian National Congress
1977	Naranjan Singh	Shiromani Akali Dal
1980	Lakha Singh	Indian National Congress (Indira)
1985	Tara Singh	Shiromani Akali Dal
1992	Ranjit Singh	Shiromani Akali Dal
1997	Ranjit Singh	Shiromani Akali Dal
2002	Manjit Singh Mianwind	Shiromani Akali Dal
2007	Manjit Singh Mianwind	Shiromani Akali Dal
2012	Ramanjit Singh Sikki	Indian National Congress
2016^	Ravinder Singh Brahmpura	Shiromani Akali Dal
2017	Ramanjit Singh Sikki	Indian National Congress
2022	Manjinder Singh Lalpura	Aam Aadmi Party

^Bypoll

== Election results ==
=== 2027 ===
Punjab Assembly election, 2027: Khadoor Sahib
Party	Candidate	Votes	%	±%
AAP				
AD (WPD)				New entry
INC				
BSP				
SAD				
BJP				New entry
NOTA	None of the above			
Majority				
Turnout				

=== 2022 ===
Punjab Assembly election, 2022: Khadoor Sahib
Party	Candidate	Votes	%	±%
AAP	Manjinder Singh Lalpura	55,756	38.7	
INC	Ramanjit Singh Sikki	39,265	27.2	
SAD	Ranjit Singh Brahmpura	38,532	26.7	
SAD(A)	Jaswant Singh Sohal	5,473	3.8	
NOTA	None of the above	1,059	0.5	
Majority		16,491	11.35	
Turnout		145,256	71.4	
Registered electors		203,539		

=== 2017 ===
Punjab Assembly election, 2017: Khadoor Sahib
Party	Candidate	Votes	%	±%
INC	Ramanjit Singh Sikki	64,665	44.44	
SAD	Ravinder Singh Brahmpura	47,611	32.71	
AAP	Bhupinder Singh	28,644	19.68	
CPI	Baldev Singh Dhunda	1,756	1.21	
SAD(A)	Karam Singh Bhoian	1,257	0.86	
BSP	Dyal Singh	770	0.53	
APP	Daljit Singh	457	0.31	
Independent	Bagga Singh	381	0.26	
Registered electors				
