= Virsa Singh Valtoha =

Indian politician

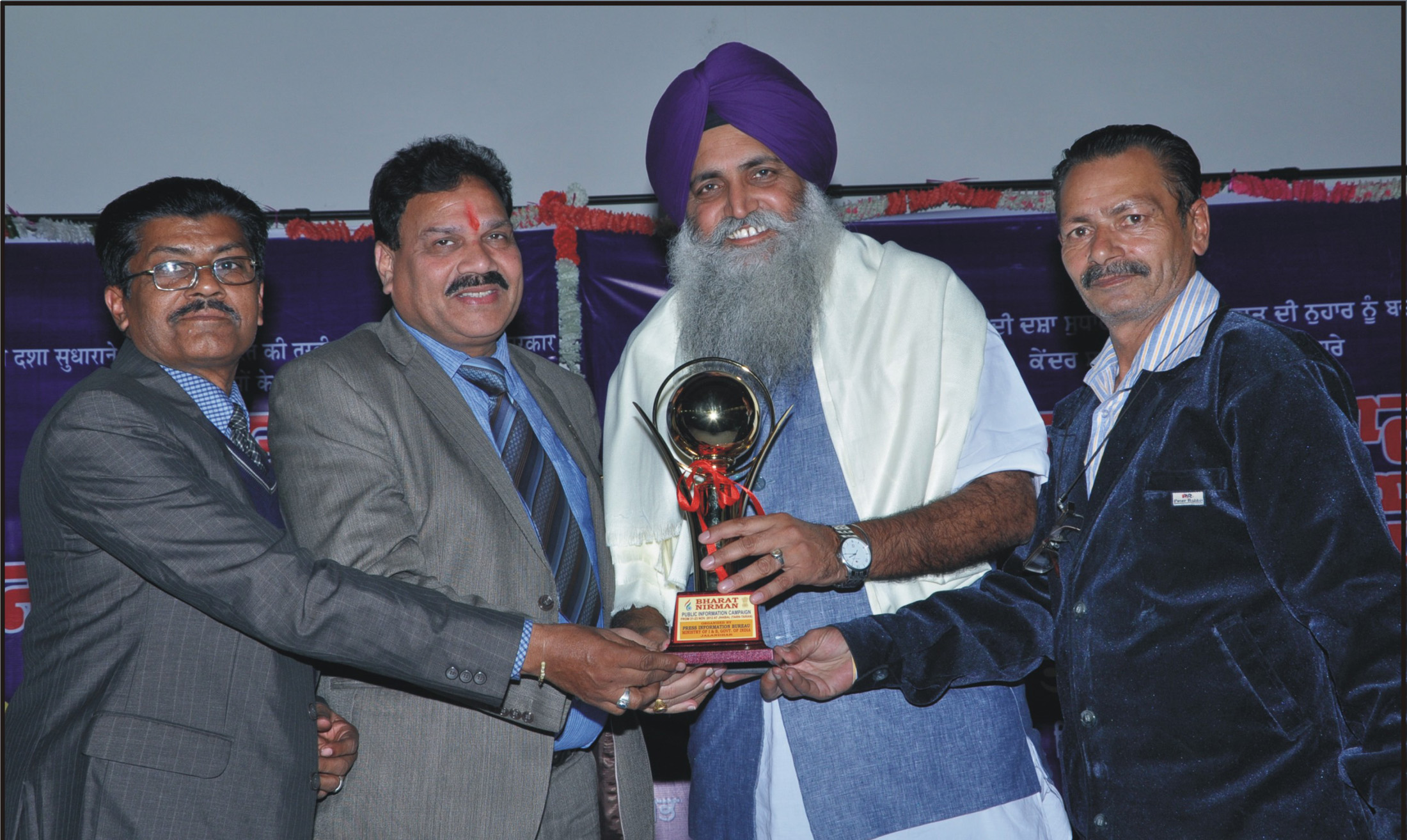
- Valtoha (second from right)

Member of Punjab Legislative Assembly
- In office 2007–2017
- Preceded by: Gurchet Singh
- Constituency: Khem Karan

Chief Parliamentary Secretary
- In office 2012-2017
- Succeeded by: Sukhpal Singh Bhullar

Personal details
- Born: 1960 (age 65–66)
- Party: Shiromani Akali Dal
- Spouse: Palwinder Kaur
- Children: 1

Virsa Singh Valtoha is a former SIkh militant and Indian politician belonging to Shiromani Akali Dal party. He is a former member of the Punjab Legislative Assembly who represented Khem Karan.

== Family and early life ==
His father's name is Sohan Singh. Virsa Singh Valtoha's son's name is Mr. Gauravdeep Singh, who is advocate at Punjab And Haryana High Court. He is also the president of SOI (Student Organization Of India) from Majha Zone (Punjab). Valtoha received training in being a granthi, but chose to pursue higher education instead. In 1981 Valtoha was unable to pass first year English examination for his bachelor of arts. Valtoha joined the Communist Party of India (Marxist) youth-wing out of frustration, but in 1982 he left and joined the All India Sikh Student Federation instead.

== Political career ==
Valtoha first became involved in the All India Sikh Student Federation during the time of Sant Jarnail Singh Bhindranwale. During this period he was allegedly behind multiple killings and bomb blasts. Valtoha was elected to the Punjab Legislative Assembly from the Valtoha constituency in 2007. During the 2012 Punjab election, Valtoha constituency underwent boundary delimitation. Valtoha then successfully contested the Punjab Assembly seat from Khem Karan. Valtoha served as an MLA from 2007-2017 and a chief parliamentary secretary from 2012-2017. He was a member of the Akali Dal top-decision making body.

== Controversies ==
=== For using casteist remark ===
Valtoha has been accused of insulting dalits (a historically discriminated community of lower caste people placed at the end of the caste pyramid, who constitute 36% of the states population in India), by a member of an opposition party in the legislature. Due to a casteist slur by Virsa Singh Valtoha, former Ravidassia M.L.A. Tarlochan Singh Soondh hurled a shoe towards Valtoha in the Punjab State Legislative Assembly

Giani Harpreet Singh also accused Virsa Singh Valtoha of issuing threats to his family, abducting his daughter, and raising caste remarks against him for being a Dalit Sikh.

=== Electricity theft by Valtoha family ===
In March 2020, Virsa Singh Valtoha was fined ₹1.9 lakh for electricity theft at his residence in Amarkot, near Tarn Taran, Punjab. The Punjab State Power Corporation Limited (PSPCL) conducted a raid and discovered that Valtoha's property was illegally drawing power. The sanctioned load was 4.85 kW, but the actual consumption was 11 kW, with unauthorized connections bypassing the meter. Additionally, the team found wires connected directly from a transformer, indicating deliberate power theft.

=== Claiming B. R. Ambedkar Fanned Casteism ===
During a TV discussion in 2016, Valtoha accused Dr. B. R. Ambedkar of promoting casteism by advocating reservations. This remark drew sharp backlash from the AAP, which demanded legal action and later saw public protests in Tarn Taran, including effigy burning.

=== Threats to Officials - Video Goes Viral ===
In 2017, a video circulated showing Valtoha allegedly threatening Tarn Taran’s Deputy Commissioner (DC) and police officers. He warned them against harassing Akali workers, stating he had taken note of names and would act accordingly. The Congress condemned the act as intimidation of officials.

=== Involvement in the Chawla case ===
In 2026, Virsa Singh Valtoha became involved in the controversy surrounding the rape case against Shiromani Akali Dal leader Amarjit Singh Chawla. The complainant alleged that Valtoha helped facilitate her travel from Bahrain to Punjab and had communications with her. Valtoha denied wrongdoing and defended Chawla. An audio recording involving Valtoha was later released by the Aam Aadmi Party, although its authenticity and context remained disputed. Valtoha was not named as an accused of rape in the FIR against Chawla.

== Electoral performance ==
Punjab Assembly election, 2007: Valtoha
Party	Candidate	Votes	%	±%
SAD	Virsa Singh Valtoha	52,085	52.8	
INC	Gurchet Singh	40,735	41.3	
CPI	Kiranbir Kaur	3,088	3.1	
Majority		11,350	11.5	
Turnout		98,632	83.0	
Registered electors		118,796		

Punjab Assembly election, 2012: Khem Karan
Party	Candidate	Votes	%	±%
SAD	Virsa Singh Valtoha	73,328	49.5	
INC	Gurchet Singh	60,226	40.6	
Majority		13,102	8.9	
Turnout		147,983	82.1	
Registered electors		180,145		

Punjab Assembly election, 2017: Khem Karan
Party	Candidate	Votes	%	±%
INC	Sukhpal Singh Bhullar	81,897	53.0	
SAD	Virsa Singh Valtoha	62,295	40.3	
AAP	Bikramajit Singh	6,568	4.3	
NOTA	None of the above	1,484	0.70	
Majority		19,602	12.8	
Turnout		153,020	77.60	
Registered electors		199,211		

Assembly election, 2022: Khemkaran
Party	Candidate	Votes	%	±%
AAP	Sarvan Singh Dhun	64,541	41.64	
SAD	Virsa Singh Valtoha	52,659	33.98	
INC	Sukhpal Singh Bhullar	28,859	18.62	
SAD(A)	Harpal Singh Baler	3,270	2.11	
NOTA	None of the above	1,832	1.18	
SAD(S)	Daljit Singh Gill	422	0.27	New
Majority		11,882	7.66	
Turnout		1,54,988	71.08	
Registered electors		218,055		
AAP gain from INC		Swing		

2024 Indian general election: Khadoor Sahib
Party	Candidate	Votes	%	±%
Independent	Amritpal Singh	404,430	38.62	New
INC	Kulbir Singh Zira	207,310	19.80	▼24.15
AAP	Laljit Singh Bhullar	194,836	18.61	▲17.30
SAD	Virsa Singh Valtoha	86,416	8.25	▼22.26
BJP	Manjit Singh Mianwind	86,373	8.25	New
Margin of victory		197,120	18.82	▲5.38
Turnout		1,047,165		
Independent gain from INC		Swing		
