= Khem Karan Assembly constituency =

Legislative Assembly constituency in Punjab State, India

Coordinates: 31.14°N 74.56°E

Khem Karan
- Constituency No. 22 for the Punjab Legislative Assembly

Constituency details
- Country: India
- State: Punjab
- District: Tarn Taran
- Lok Sabha constituency: Khadoor Sahib
- Total electors: 218,055
- Reservation: None

Member of Legislative Assembly
- 16th Punjab Legislative Assembly
- Incumbent Sarvan Singh Dhun
- Party: Aam Aadmi Party
- Elected year: 2022

Khem Karan Assembly constituency is one of the 117 Legislative Assembly constituencies of Punjab state in India. It is part of Tarn Taran district.

== Members of the Legislative Assembly ==
Most successful parties from Khem Karan Vidhan Sabha
1. SAD (1 Time) (33.3%)
2. INC (1 Time) (33.3%)
3. AAP (1 Time) (33.3%)

Year	Member	Party
2012	Virsa Singh Valtoha	Shiromani Akali Dal
2017	Sukhpal Singh Bhullar	Indian National Congress
2022	Sarvan Singh Dhun	Aam Aadmi Party

== Election results ==
=== 2027 ===
Punjab Assembly election, 2027: Khem Karan
Party	Candidate	Votes	%	±%
AAP	Sarvan Singh Dhun			
AD (WPD)				New entry
BJP				New entry
INC				
BSP				
SAD				
SAD(A)	Harpal Singh Baler			
NOTA	None of the above			
Majority				
Turnout				

=== 2022 ===
Assembly election, 2022: Khem Karan
Party	Candidate	Votes	%	±%
AAP	Sarvan Singh Dhun	64,541	41.64	▲37.35
SAD	Virsa Singh Valtoha	52,659	33.98	▼6.73
INC	Sukhpal Singh Bhullar	28,859	18.62	▼34.90
SAD(A)	Harpal Singh Baler	3,270	2.11	New entry
NOTA	None of the above	1,832	1.18	
SAD(S)	Daljit Singh Gill	422	0.27	New entry
Majority		11,882	7.66	
Turnout		154,988	71.08	
Registered electors		218,055		
AAP gain from INC		Swing		

=== 2017 ===
Punjab Assembly election, 2017: Khem Karan
Party	Candidate	Votes	%	±%
INC	Sukhpal Singh Bhullar	81,897	53.52	▲12.83
SAD	Virsa Singh Valtoha	62,295	40.71	▼8.84
AAP	Bikramajit Singh	6,568	4.29	New entry
NOTA	None of the above	1,484	0.97	
Majority		19,602	12.8	
Turnout		153,020	77.60	
Registered electors		199,211		
INC gain from SAD		Swing		

=== 2012 ===
Punjab Assembly election, 2012: Khem Karan
Party	Candidate	Votes	%	±%
SAD	Virsa Singh Valtoha	73,328	49.55	New entry
INC	Gurchet Singh	60,226	40.69	New entry
PPoP	Sarwan Singh Dhun	8,398	5.67	New entry
Majority		13,102	8.9	
Turnout		147,983	81.67	
Registered electors		180,145		

== See also ==
- List of constituencies of the Punjab Legislative Assembly
- Tarn Taran district
