= 2012 Punjab Legislative Assembly election =

2012 Punjab legislative assembly election
- 30 January 2012

All 117 seats to the Punjab Legislative Assembly 59 seats needed for a majority
- Turnout: 78.30% (▲2.88pp)
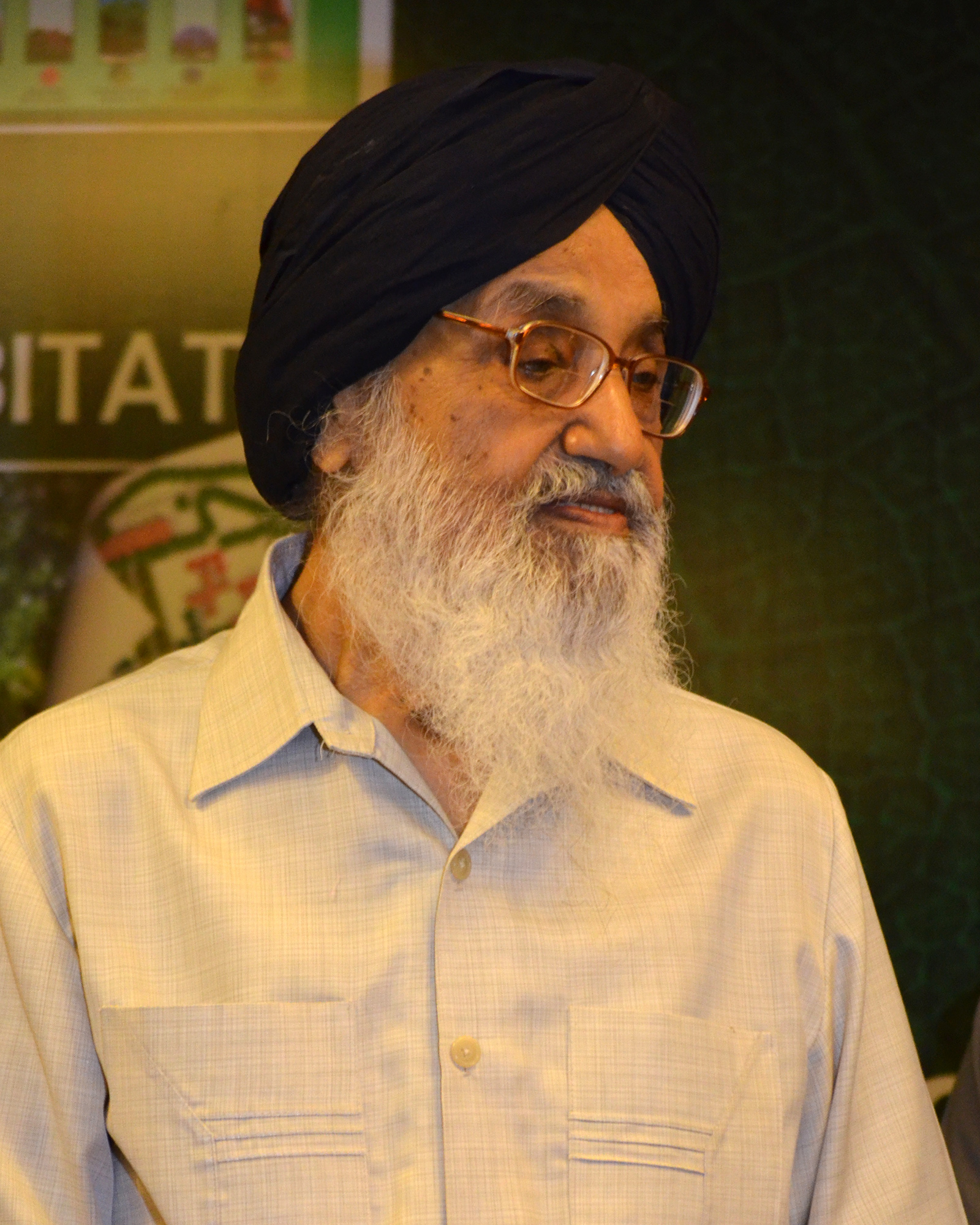

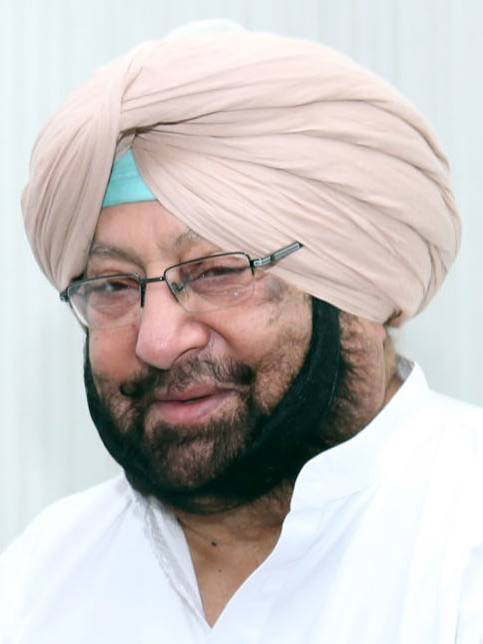
	First party	Second party	Third party
			BJP
Leader	Parkash Singh Badal	Captain Amarinder Singh	Ashwani Kumar Sharma
Party	SAD	INC	BJP
Alliance	NDA	UPA	NDA
Leader since	1 March 1997	26 February 2002	4 February 2010
Leader's seat	Lambi	Patiala	Pathankot
Last election	48	44	19
Seats won	56	46	12
Seat change	▲8	▲2	▼7
Popular vote	4,828,612	5,572,643	998,098
Percentage	34.73%	40.09%	7.18 %
Swing	▼2.36 pp	▼0.81 pp	▼1.1 pp
- Seatwise result map of the election

- Structure of the Punjab Legislative Assembly after the election
Chief Minister before election
Parkash Singh Badal
SAD
Elected Chief Minister
Parkash Singh Badal
SAD

The Punjab legislative assembly election, 2012 was held on 30 January 2012, to elect 117 members to the 14th Punjab Legislative Assembly. The results of the election were announced on 6 March 2012. The ruling Shiromani Akali Dal – Bharatiya Janata Party alliance led by Parkash Singh Badal won the elections and became Chief Minister of Punjab for the fifth time.

== Background ==
Punjab have tradition of transfer of power every 5 years between Shiromani Akali Dal and Indian National Congress but this election of 2012 is different from others where ruling party again came to power

2012 Assembly Elections in Punjab received attention for being the first elections after reorganisation of Punjab in 1966 to witness the return of an incumbent party.

This elections also saw the emergence of new political leadership, like rise of Sukhbir Singh Badal and the rise and fall of Manpreet Singh Badal, the founder of the Peoples Party of Punjab.

=== Religion and Caste Data ===
Religion Data

As per the 2011 census,

2011 Population data of Punjab (Religion Based)
S. No.	Religion	% Population
1.	Sikhs	57.68
2.	Hindus	37.5
3.	Muslims	1.93
4.	Christians	1.3
5.	Buddhists	1.2
6.	Jains	0.16
7.	Others/Non-religions	0.31

Population by faith in Punjab, India (2011)
1. Sikh (58.0%)
2. Hindu (38.5%)
3. Muslim (1.90%)
4. Christian (1.30%)
5. Others and non - religious (0.60%)

Caste Data

1. Dalits (Scheduled Castes) constitute 31.94% of the population, the highest percentage amongst all the states.
2. Other Backward Classes (OBCs) like -Sainis, Sunar, Kambojs, Tarkhans/Ramgarhias, Gurjars, Kumhars/Prajapatis, Telis, Banjaras, Lohars constitute 31.3% of the population.
3. Jat-Sikhs comprise 21% of the population while other forward castes (general category) - Brahmins, Khatris/Bhapas, Bania, Thakurs/Rajputs constitute around rest.
4. As of 2016, Government of India has not publicly released Socio Economic and Caste Census 2011 caste population data for every single non-SC/ST castes (General castes, OBC/EBCs) in India.

Caste Population data of Punjab
Constitutional categories	Population (%)	Castes
Other Backward Classes (OBC)	31.3%	includes Sikh Rajputs, Saini (Sainis added to OBC list in 2016), Sunar, Kamboj, Labana, Tarkhan/Ramgarhia, Kumhar/Prajapati, Arain, Gurjar, Teli, Banjara, Lohar, Bhat, Others
Scheduled Castes (Dalits)	31.9%	includes Mazhabi Sikh - 10%, Ramdasia Sikh/Ravidassia (Chamar)/Ad-Dharmi - 13.1%, Balmiki/Bhanghi - 3.5%, Bazigar - 1.05%, Others - 4%
Unreserved (mostly Upper castes)	33%	includes Jat Sikh - 21%, (Brahmin, Rajput, Bania, Khatri-Arora-Sood) - 12%
Others (religious minorities)	3.8%	includes Muslims, Christians, Buddhists, Jains

Caste Category
1. General (33.0%)
2. SC (31.9%)
3. OBC (31.3%)
4. Others (3.80%)

== Timeline of events ==
Schedule for General Election to the Legislative Assembly of Punjab 2012

S.No.	Event	Date	Day
1.	Date for Nominations	05.01.2012	Thursday
2.	Last Date for filing Nominations	12.01.2012	Thursday
3.	Date for scrutiny of nominations	13.01.2012	Friday
4.	Last date for withdrawal of candidatures	16.01.2012	Monday
5.	Date of poll	30.01.2012	Monday
6.	Date of counting	04.03.2012	Sunday
7.	Date before which the election shall be completed	09.03.2012	Friday

== Voter Turnout ==
Regions/Districts	Total Seats	Turnout (%)	Congress		SAD+BJP		BSP		Independents	Others
			Won	Vote (%)	Won	Vote (%)	Won	Vote (%)	Won	Vote (%)
MAJHA
Majha	25	75.0	9	41.2	16	47.2	0	1.2	0	1.1
Gurdaspur	10	76.3	5	42.7	5	45.8	0	0.9	0	1.4
Amritsar	11	71.8	3	38.5	8	48.9	0	0.9	0	1.0
Tarn Taran	4	79.6	1	43.9	3	46.6	0	2.6	0	0.9
DOABA
Doaba	23	76.4	6	37.1	16	41.3	0	4.0	0	12.1
Kapurthala	4	79.0	2	43.4	2	44.1	0	2.7	0	7.4
Jalandhar	9	75.6	0	37.9	9	43.2	0	3.0	0	12.7
Hoshiarpur	7	75.2	2	35.9	4	40.9	0	3.1	0	9.5
Nawan Shahr	3	79.3	2	29.6	1	32.9	0	11.0	0	21.9
MALWA
Malwa	69	80.6	31	40.6	36	40.3	0	6.9	0	3.0
Rupnagar	3	77.5	1	37.9	2	41.4	0	10.3	0	5.0
SAS Nagar	3	75.8	2	30.7	1	38.3	0	4.6	0	7.7
Fatehgarh Sahib	3	81.9	2	33.7	1	35.5	0	20.9	0	4.1
Ludhiana	14	76.0	6	40.7	6	39.9	0	4.6	0	3.3
Moga	4	80.5	1	43.2	3	45.2	0	3.8	0	1.5
Ferozepur	8	83.4	3	37.4	5	39.4	0	2.8	0	1.9
Muktsar	4	85.2	2	40.2	2	41.0	0	12.7	0	2.6
Faridkot	3	84.1	1	38.8	2	43.2	0	7.1	0	2.3
Bathinda	6	82.6	2	40.9	4	42.0	0	9.7	0	1.6
Mansa	3	84.4	1	38.4	2	39.6	0	8.7	0	2.6
Sangrur	7	84.5	2	40.4	5	41.5	0	10.9	0	2.9
Barnala	3	81.8	3	45.9	0	40.1	0	4.1	0	4.0
Patiala	8	78.5	5	49.9	3	37.6	0	3.1	0	2.8
Total	117	78.6	46	40.1	68	41.9	0	5.2	0	4.3
“Others” in this

== Parties and Alliances ==
=== National Democratic Alliance ===
2012 NDA Seat Sharing Map Punjab

No.	Party	Flag	Symbol	Photo	Leader	Seats contested	Seats Won
1.	Shiromani Akali Dal				Sukhbir Singh Badal	94	56
2.	Bharatiya Janata Party					23	12

=== United Progressive Alliance ===
No.	Party	Flag	Symbol	Photo	Leader	Seats contested	Seats Won
1.	Indian National Congress		Hand		Captain Amarinder Singh	117	46

=== Sanjha Morcha ===
No.	Party	Flag	Symbol	Photo	Leader	Seats contested
1.	People's Party of Punjab				Manpreet Singh Badal	87
2.	Communist Party of India (Marxist)					9
3.	Communist Party of India					14
4.	Shiromani Akali Dal (Longowal)					

Bahujan Samaj Party

No.	Party	Flag	Symbol	Photo	Leader	Seats contested
1.	Bahujan Samaj Party				Jasbir Singh Garhi	117

=== Others ===
No.	Party	Seats contested
1.	Shiromani Akali Dal (Amritsar)	57
2.	BSP(A)	17
3.	BGTD	10
4	Nationalist Congress Party	13
5.	Communist Party of India (M–L) Liberation	7
6.	BSA	6
7	BCP	3
8	BRSP	6
9	Lok Janshakti Party	26
10	Rashtriya Janata Dal	1
11	Independent politician	418
12	Shiv Sena	12
13	SSPD	5

== Opinion Polls ==
Most of the opinion polls predicted that Congress will win the election. They were proved wrong as Congress finished as the runner up.

Polling firm/Link	SAD-BJP	INC	Others
India Today Aaj Tak	40	69	8
Election results	56	46	15

=== Exit Polls ===
2012 exit polls for Punjab Assembly Elections results.

Polling firm/Link	SAD-BJP	INC	Others
India TV C-Voter	47	65	5
News 24	52	60	5
CNN-IBN	51-63	48-60	3-9
Election results	56	46	15

== Results ==
=== Party-wise Results ===
Parties and coalitions	Popular vote			Seats		
Parties and coalitions	Votes	%	±pp	Contested	Won	+/−
Shiromani Akali Dal (SAD)	4,828,612	34.73	▼2.36	94	56	▲8
Indian National Congress (INC)	5,572,643	40.09	▼0.81	117	46	▲2
Bharatiya Janata Party (BJP)	998,098	7.18	▼1.1	23	12	▼7
Independents (IND)	938,770	6.75	▼0.07	418	3	▼2
Total	13,901,424	100.00			117	
Valid votes	13,901,424	99.94				
Invalid votes	8,149	0.06				
Votes cast / turnout	13,909,573	78.30				
Abstentions	3,855,182	21.70				
Registered voters	17,764,755					

=== Result by region ===
Region	Seats				
Region	Seats	INC	SAD	BJP	OTH
Malwa	69	31	34	2	2
Majha	25	9	11	5	0
Doaba	23	6	11	5	1
Total	117	46	56	12	3

Among parties:

Regions	Total seats	Turnout (%)	Congress		SAD+BJP	
Regions	Total seats	Turnout (%)	Won	Votes (%)	Won	Votes (%)
Majha	25	75.0	9	41.2	16	47.2
Doaba	23	76.4	6	37.1	16	41.3
Malwa	69	80.6	31	40.6	36	40.3
Total	117	78.6	46	40.1	68	41.9

=== Results by district ===
District	Seats				
District	Seats	INC	SAD	BJP	OTH
Amritsar	11	3	6	2	0
Gurdaspur	10	5	5	0	0
Pathankot	3	0	0	3	0
Tarn Taran	4	1	3	0	0
Jalandhar	9	0	6	3	0
Hoshiarpur	7	2	3	1	1
Kapurthala	4	2	1	1	0
Nawanshahr	3	2	1	0	0
Ludhiana	14	6	6	0	2
Patiala	8	5	3	0	0
Sangrur	7	2	5	0	0
Bathinda	6	2	4	0	0
Firozpur	8	3	4	1	0
Moga	4	1	3	0	0
Sri Muktsar Sahib	4	2	2	0	0
Barnala	3	3	0	0	0
Faridkot	3	1	2	0	0
Fatehgarh Sahib	3	2	1	0	0
Mansa	3	1	2	0	0
Rup Nagar	3	1	1	1	0
S.A.S. Nagar	3	2	1	0	0
Total	117	46	56	12	3

== Result by constituency ==
List of constituency-wise winner candidates and parties
Sr.No	Constituency	Winning candidate	Party	Runner Candidate	Party
1	Sujanpur	Dinesh Singh	BJP	Naresh Puri	Independent
2	Bhoa (SC)	Seema Kumari	BJP	Balbir Ram	INC
3	Pathankot	Ashwani Kumar Sharma	BJP	Raman Bhalla	INC
4	Gurdaspur	Gurbachan Singh Babbehali	SAD	Raman Bahl	INC
5	Dina Nagar (SC)	Aruna Chaudhary	INC	Bishan Dass	BJP
6	Qadian	Charanjit Kaur Bajwa	INC	Sewa Singh Sekhwan	SAD
7	Batala	Ashwani Sekhri	INC	Lakhbir Singh Lodhi Nangal	SAD
8	Sri Hargobindpur (SC)	Des Raj Dhugga	SAD	Balwinder Singh Laddi	INC
9	Fatehgarh Churian	Tripat Rajinder Singh Bajwa	INC	Nirmal Singh Kahlon	SAD
10	Dera Baba Nanak	Sukhjinder Singh	INC	Sucha Singh	SAD
11	Ajnala	Bonny Amarpal Singh Ajnala	SAD	Harpartap Singh Ajnala	INC
12	Raja Sansi	Sukhbinder Singh Sarkaria	INC	Vir Singh Lopoke	SAD
13	Majitha	Bikram Singh Majithia (E)	SAD	Sukhjinder Raj Singh (Lali)	Independent
14	Jandiala (SC)	Baljit Singh Jalal Usma	SAD	Sardul Singh Bandala	INC
15	Amritsar North	Anil Joshi	BJP	Karamjit Singh Rintu	INC
16	Amritsar West (SC)	Raj Kumar (E)	INC	Rakesh Gill	BJP
17	Amritsar Central	Om Parkash Soni (E)	INC	Tarun Chugh	BJP
18	Amritsar East	Navjot Sidhu (E/W)	BJP	Simarpreet Kaur	Independent
19	Amritsar South	Inderbir Singh Bolaria (E)	SAD	Jasbir Singh Gill (Dimpa)	INC
20	Attari (SC)	Gulzar Singh Ranike (E)	SAD	Tarsem Singh D.C	INC
21	Tarn Taran	Harmeet Singh Sandhu	SAD	Dr.Dharambir Agnihotri	INC
22	Khem Karan	Virsa Singh	SAD	Gurchet Singh	INC
23	Patti	Adeshpartap Singh Kairon	SAD	Harminder Singh Gill	INC
24	Khadoor Sahib	Ramanjit Singh Sikki	INC	Ranjit Singh Brahampura	SAD
25	Baba Bakala (SC)	Manjit Singh Manna Mianwind (E)	SAD	Ranjit Singh (Chhajjalwadi)	INC
26	Bholath	Bibi Jagir Kaur	SAD	Sukhpal Singh	INC
27	Kapurthala	Rana Gurjit Singh	INC	Sarabjeet Singh Makkar	SAD
28	Sultanpur Lodhi	Navtej Singh	INC	Upinderjit Kaur	SAD
29	Phagwara (SC)	Som Parkash	BJP	Balbir Kumar Sodhi	INC
30	Phillaur (SC)	Avinash Chander	SAD	Santokh Singh Chaudhary	INC
31	Nakodar	Gurpartap Singh Wadala	SAD	Amarjit Singh Samra	INC
32	Shahkot	Ajit Singh Kohar	SAD	Col. C D Singh Kamboj	INC
33	Kartarpur (SC)	Sarwan Singh	SAD	Chauhdary Jagjit Singh	INC
34	Jalandhar West (SC)	Chuni Lal Bhagat	BJP	Suman Kaypee	INC
35	Jalandhar Central	Manoranjan Kalia	BJP	Rajinder Beri	INC
36	Jalandhar North	K. D. Bhandari	BJP	Avtar Henry	INC
37	Jalandhar Cantt	Pargat Singh	SAD	Jagbir Singh Brar	INC
38	Adampur (SC)	Sh. Pawan Kumar Tinu	SAD	Sh. Satnam Singh Kainth	INC
39	Mukerian	Rajnish Kumar	Independent	Arunesh Kumar	BJP
40	Dasuya	Amarjit Singh	BJP	Ramesh Chander Dogra	INC
41	Urmar	Sangat Singh	INC	Arbinder Singh	SAD
42	Sham Chaurasi (SC)	Mohinder Kaur Josh	SAD	Chaudhary Ram Lubhaya	INC
43	Hoshiarpur	Sunder Sham Arora	INC	Tikshan Sud	BJP
44	Chabbewal (SC)	Sohan Singh Thandal	SAD	Dr. Raj Kumar	INC
45	Garhshankar	Surinder Singh Bhulewal Rathan	SAD	Lov Kumar Goldy	INC
46	Banga (SC)	Tarlochan Singh	INC	Mohan Singh	SAD
47	Nawan Shahr	Guriqbal Kaur	INC	Satinder Kaur Kariha	SAD
48	Balachaur	Nand Lal	SAD	Shiv Ram Singh	BSP
49	Anandpur Sahib	Madan Mohan Mittal	BJP	Kanwar Pal Singh	INC
50	Rupnagar	Dr Daljeet Singh Cheema	SAD	Romesh Dutt Sharma	INC
51	Chamkaur Sahib (SC)	Charanjit Singh Channi	INC	Jagmeet Kaur	SAD
52	Kharar	Jagmohan Singh	INC	Ujjagar Singh	SAD
53	S.A.S. Nagar	Balbir Singh Sidhu	INC	Balwant Singh Ramoowalia	SAD
54	Bassi Pathana (SC)	Justice Nirmal Singh	SAD	Harbans Kaur Dullo	INC
55	Fatehgarh Sahib	Kuljit Singh Nagra	INC	Prem Singh Chandumajra	SAD
56	Amloh	Randeep Singh	INC	Jagdeep Singh Cheema	SAD
57	Khanna	Gurkirat Singh	INC	Ranjit Singh Talwandi	SAD
58	Samrala	Amrik Singh	INC	Kirpal Singh	SAD
59	Sahnewal	Sharanjit Singh Dhillon	SAD	Vikram Singh Bajwa	INC
60	Ludhiana East	Ranjit Singh Dhillon	SAD	Gurmail Singh Pehalwan	INC
61	Ludhiana South	Balwinder Singh Bains	Independent	Hakam Singh Giaspura	SAD
62	Atam Nagar	Simarjit Singh Bains	Independent	Hira Singh Gabria	SAD
63	Ludhiana Central	Surinder Kumar Dawar	INC	Satpal Gosain	BJP
64	Ludhiana West	Bharat Bhushan Ashu	INC	Prof. Rajinder Bhandari	BJP
65	Ludhiana North	Rakesh Panday	INC	Parveen Bansal	BJP
66	Gill (SC)	Darshan Singh Shivalik	SAD	Malkiat Singh Dakha	INC
67	Payal (SC)	Charanjit Singh Atwal	SAD	Lakhvir Singh	INC
68	Dakha	Manpreet Singh Ayali	SAD	Jasbir Singh Khangura(Jassi Khangura)	INC
69	Raikot (SC)	Gurcharan Singh	INC	Bikramjit Singh	SAD
70	Jagraon (SC)	S R Kaler	SAD	Ishar Singh	INC
71	Nihal Singh Wala (SC)	Rajwinder Kaur	SAD	Ajit Singh Shant	INC
72	Bhagha Purana	Maheshinder Singh	SAD	Darshan Singh Brar Khote	INC
73	Moga	Joginder Pal Jain	INC	Paramdeep Singh Gill	SAD
74	Dharamkot	Tota Singh	SAD	Sukhjit Singh	INC
75	Zira	Hari Singh	SAD	Naresh Kumar	INC
76	Firozpur City	Parminder Singh Pinki	INC	Sukhpal Singh	BJP
77	Firozpur Rural (SC)	Joginder Singh Alias Jindu	SAD	Satkar Kaur	INC
78	Guru Har Sahai	Gurmeet Singh Sodhi	INC	Vardev Singh	SAD
79	Jalalabad	Sukhbir Singh Badal	SAD	Hans Raj Josan	Independent
80	Fazilka	Surjit Kumar Jyani	BJP	Jaswinder Singh	Independent
81	Abohar	Sunil Kumar Jakhar	INC	Shiv Lal Doda	Independent
82	Balluana (SC)	Gurtej Singh	SAD	Giriraj Rajora	INC
83	Lambi	Parkash Singh Badal	SAD	Maheshinder Singh	INC
84	Gidderbaha	Amrinder Singh Raja Warring	INC	Sant Singh Brar	SAD
85	Malout (SC)	Harpreet Singh	SAD	Nathu Ram	INC
86	Muktsar	Karan Kaur	INC	Kanwarjit Singh Rozy Barkandi	SAD
87	Faridkot	Deep Malhotra	SAD	Avtar Singh Brar	INC
88	Kotkapura	Mantar Singh Brar	SAD	Ripjeet Singh Brar	INC
89	Jaitu (SC)	Joginder Singh	INC	Gurdev Singh	SAD
90	Rampura Phul	Sikander Singh Maluka	SAD	Gurpreet Singh Kangar	INC
91	Bhucho Mandi (SC)	Ajaib Singh Bhatti	INC	Pritam Singh	SAD
92	Bathinda Urban	Sarup Chand Singla	SAD	Harminder Singh Jassi	INC
93	Bathinda Rural (SC)	Darshan Singh Kotfatta	SAD	Makhan Singh	INC
94	Talwandi Sabo	Jeetmohinder Singh Sidhu	INC	Amarjit Singh Sidhu	SAD
95	Maur	Janmeja Singh	SAD	Mangat Rai Bansal	INC
96	Mansa	Prem Mittal	SAD	Gurpreet Kaur	INC
97	Sardulgarh	Ajit Inder Singh	INC	Dilraj Singh Bhunder	SAD
98	Budhlada (SC)	Chatin Singh	SAD	Satpal Singh	INC
99	Lehra	Rajinder Kaur Bhattal	INC	Sukhwant Singh	SAD
100	Dirba (SC)	Sant Balvir Singh Ghunas	SAD	Ajaib Singh	INC
101	Sunam	Parminder Singh Dhindsa	SAD	Aman Arora	INC
102	Bhadaur (SC)	Mohammed Sadique	INC	Darbara Singh Guru	SAD
103	Barnala	Kewal Singh Dhillon	INC	Malkit Singh Kittu	SAD
104	Mehal Kalan (SC)	Harchand Kaur	INC	Gobind Singh	SAD
105	Malerkotla	F. Nesara Khatoon (Farzana Alam)	SAD	Razia Sultana	INC
106	Amargarh	Iqbal Singh Jhundan	SAD	Surjit Singh Dhiman	INC
107	Dhuri	Arvind Khanna	INC	Gobind Singh	SAD
108	Sangrur	Parkash Chand Garg	SAD	Surinder Pal Singh Sibia	INC
109	Nabha (SC)	Sadhu Singh	INC	Balwant Singh	SAD
110	Patiala Rural	Brahm Mohindra	INC	Kuldeep Kaur Tohra	SAD
111	Rajpura	Hardyal Singh Kamboj	INC	Raj Khurana	BJP
112	Dera Bassi	N.K. Sharma	SAD	Deepinder Singh Dhillon	Independent
113	Ghanaur	Harpreet Kaur Mukhmailpura	SAD	Madan Lal Jalalpur	INC
114	Sanour	Lal Singh	INC	Tejinderpal Singh Sandhu	SAD
115	Patiala	Amarinder Singh	INC	Surjit Singh Kohli	SAD
116	Samana	Surjit Singh Rakhra	SAD	Raninder Singh	INC
117	Shutrana (SC)	Vaninder Kaur Loomba	SAD	Nirmal Singh	INC

== By-polls 2012-2017 ==
No.	Date	Constituency	MLA before election	Party before election	Elected MLA	Party after election	Reason
1.	11 July 2012	Dasuya	Amarjit Singh	Bharatiya Janata Party	Sukhjit Kaur	Bharatiya Janata Party	Death
2.	23 February 2013	Moga	Joginder Pal Jain	Indian National Congress	Joginder Pal Jain	Shiromani Akali Dal	Resigned
3.	21 August 2014	Patiala Urban	Amarinder Singh	Indian National Congress	Preneet Kaur	Indian National Congress	Elected MP
4.	21 August 2014	Talwandi Sabo	Jeetmohinder Singh Sidhu	Indian National Congress	Jeetmohinder Singh Sidhu	Shiromani Akali Dal	Resigned
5.	2015	Dhuri	Arvind Khanna	Indian National Congress	Gobind Singh Longowal	Shiromani Akali Dal	Resigned
6.	13 February 2016	Khadoor Sahib	Ramanjit Singh Sikki	Indian National Congress	Ranjit Singh Brahampura	Shiromani Akali Dal	Resigned

== See also ==
- Politics of Punjab, India
- 2017 Punjab Legislative Assembly election
- 2007 Punjab Legislative Assembly election
- 2012 elections in India
