= Gurpreet Singh Banawali =

Indian politician

Gurpreet Singh

MLA, Punjab Legislative Assembly
- Incumbent
- Assumed office 2022
- Constituency: Sardulgarh
- Majority: Aam Aadmi Party

Personal details
- Party: Aam Aadmi Party

Gurpreet Singh Banawali is an Indian politician and the MLA representing the Sardulgarh Assembly constituency in the Punjab Legislative Assembly. He is a member of the Aam Aadmi Party. He was elected as the MLA in the 2022 Punjab Legislative Assembly election.

== Member of Legislative Assembly ==
The Aam Aadmi Party gained a strong 79% majority in the sixteenth Punjab Legislative Assembly by winning 92 out of 117 seats in the 2022 Punjab Legislative Assembly election. MP Bhagwant Mann was sworn in as Chief Minister on 16 March 2022.

Committee assignments of Punjab Legislative Assembly

- Chairman (2022–23) Committee on Agriculture and its allied activities

== Electoral performance ==
Punjab Assembly election, 2022: Sardulgarh
Party	Candidate	Votes	%	±%
AAP	Gurpreet Singh Banawali	75,817	49.61	
INC	Bikram Singh Mofar	34,446	22.54	
SAD	Dilraj Singh Bhunder	31,757	20.78	
SAD(A)	Baldev Singh	2,345	1.53	
BJP	Jagjit Singh Milkha	2,038	1.33	
NOTA	None of the above	684	0.45	
Majority		41,371	27.07	
Turnout		152,822	83.6	
Registered electors		183,788		
AAP gain from SAD		Swing		

State Legislative Assembly
Preceded by Dilraj Singh Bhunder	Member of the Punjab Legislative Assembly from Sardulgarh Assembly constituency 2022 –	Incumbent
