= Khadoor Sahib Lok Sabha constituency =

Lok Sabha constituency in Punjab

Coordinates: 31.4°N 75.1°E

Khadoor Sahib PB-3
- Lok Sabha constituency
- Interactive Map Outlining Khadoor Sahib Lok Sabha constituency

Constituency details
- Country: India
- State: Punjab
- Assembly constituencies: Jandiala; Tarn Taran; Khem Karan; Patti; Khadoor Sahib; Baba Bakala; Kapurthala; Sultanpur Lodhi; Zira
- Established: 2008
- Reservation: None

Member of Parliament
- 18th Lok Sabha
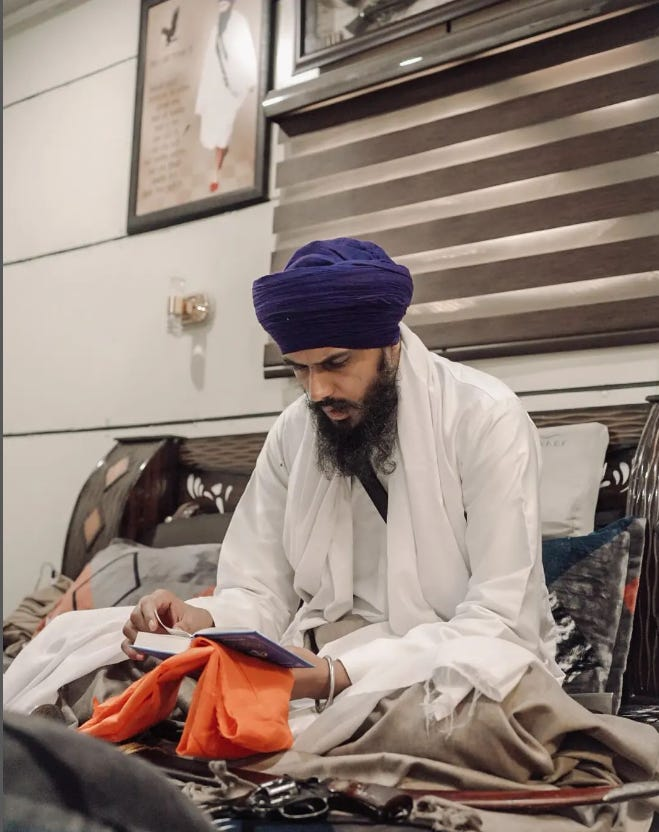
- Incumbent Amritpal Singh
- Party: AD (WPD)
- Alliance: Independent
- Elected year: 2024
- Preceded by: Jasbir Singh Gill

Khadoor Sahib Lok Sabha constituency is one of the 13 Lok Sabha (parliamentary) constituencies of the Punjab state in northern India. This new constituency came into existence as a part of the implementation of the delimitation of the parliamentary and assembly constituencies in 2008.

== Assembly segments ==
This constituency comprises or nine Vidhan Sabha (legislative assembly) segments. These are: Before delimitation, Kapurthala and Sultanpur Lodhi assembly segments were in Jalandhar, Zira assembly segment was in Firozpur and Jandiala, Patti, Khadoor Sahib and Tarn Taran assembly segments were in Tarn Taran Lok Sabha constituencies. Khem Karan assembly segment was created as a part of delimitation in 2008.

#	Name	District	Member	Party	Leading (in 2024)
14	Jandiala (SC)	Amritsar	Harbhajan Singh ETO	AAP	IND
25	Baba Bakala (SC)	Amritsar	Dalbir Singh Tong	AAP	IND
21	Tarn Taran	Tarn Taran	Harmeet Singh Sandhu	AAP	IND
22	Khem Karan	Tarn Taran	Sarvan Singh Dhun	AAP	IND
23	Patti	Tarn Taran	Laljit Singh Bhullar	AAP	IND
24	Khadoor Sahib	Tarn Taran	Manjinder Singh Lalpura	AAP	IND
27	Kapurthala	Kapurthala	Rana Gurjeet Singh	INC	INC
28	Sultanpur Lodhi	Kapurthala	Rana Inder Pratap Singh	IND	IND
75	Zira	Firozpur	Naresh Kataria	AAP	IND

== Members of Parliament ==
Most Successful parties from Khadoor Sahib Lok Sabha
1. SAD (2 Times) (50.0%)
2. INC (1 Time) (25.0%)
3. IND (1 time) (25.0%)

Year	Member	Party
1952-2008 : Constituency did not exist
2009	Rattan Singh Ajnala	Shiromani Akali Dal
2014	Ranjit Singh Brahmpura	Shiromani Akali Dal
2019	Jasbir Singh Gill	Indian National Congress
2024	Amritpal Singh	Independent

== Election results ==
=== 2024 ===
2024 Indian general election: Khadoor Sahib
Party	Candidate	Votes	%	±%
IND	Amritpal Singh	404,430	38.62	New
INC	Kulbir Singh Zira	207,310	19.80	▼24.15
AAP	Laljit Singh Bhullar	194,836	18.61	▲17.30
SAD	Virsa Singh Valtoha	86,416	8.25	▼22.26
BJP	Manjit Singh Mianwind	86,373	8.25	New
Margin of victory		197,120	18.82	▲5.38
Turnout		1,047,165		
Independent gain from INC		Swing		

=== 2019 ===
2019 Indian general election: Khadoor Sahib
Party	Candidate	Votes	%	±%
INC	Jasbir Singh Gill	459,710	43.95	▲31.70
SAD	Bibi Jagir Kaur	319,137	30.51	▼14.40
PEP	Bibi Paramjit Kaur Khalra	214,489	20.51	New
AAP	Manjinder Singh Sidhu	13,656	1.31	▼0.2
Margin of victory		140,573	13.44	▲12.25
Turnout		1,040,636	63.96	▼2.60
INC gain from SAD		Swing		

=== 2014 ===
General Election 2014: Khadoor Sahib
Party	Candidate	Votes	%	±%
SAD	Ranjit Singh Brahmpura	467,332	43.40	▼6.03
INC	Harminder Singh Gill	366,763	35.20	New
AAP	Baldeep Singh	166,763	12.25	New
SAD(A)	Simranjit Singh Mann	13,990		New
Margin of victory		100,569		▼0.22
Turnout		1,040,622	66.56	▼4.08
SAD hold		Swing		

=== 2009 ===
2009 Indian general election: Khadoor Sahib
Party	Candidate	Votes	%	±%
SAD	Dr. Rattan Singh Ajnala	467,980	49.43	
INC	Rana Gurjeet Singh	4,35,720	46.03	
BSP	Surinder Singh Shahi	13,333	1.41	
Margin of victory		32,260	1.41	
Turnout		9,46,645	70.64	
SAD win (new seat)				

== See also ==
- Tarn Taran Lok Sabha constituency
- Sangrur Lok Sabha constituency
- List of constituencies of the Lok Sabha
