= Waris Punjab De =

Political group in Punjab, India (founded 2022)

- Logo
- Formation: 29 September 2021; 5 years ago
- Founder: Deep Sidhu
- Type: Political group
- Headquarters: Amritsar
- Location: Punjab, India
- Official language: Punjabi language
- Jathedar: Amritpal Singh (since 2022)
- Affiliations: Akali Dal (Waris Punjab De)

Waris Punjab De (meaning "heirs of Punjab") is a Sikh political group based in Punjab, India. It was initially a pressure group advocating issues related to the state, which subsequently became pro-Khalistan. Deep Sidhu was the group's founder-chief until his death in February 2022. Amritpal Singh took charge of the group after the death of its founder.

== History ==
=== Formation ===
On 29 September 2021, Sandeep Singh Sidhu, popularly known as Deep Sidhu, announced the formation of Waris Punjab De, as "a Pressure group to protect and fight for rights of Punjab and raise social issues". The organization played a role in the 2020–2021 Indian farmers' protest under the leadership of its founder. During the protests, Amritpal Singh joined Waris Punjab De, founded by actor and activist Sidhu to mobilise farmers.

=== Tenure of Amritpal Singh ===
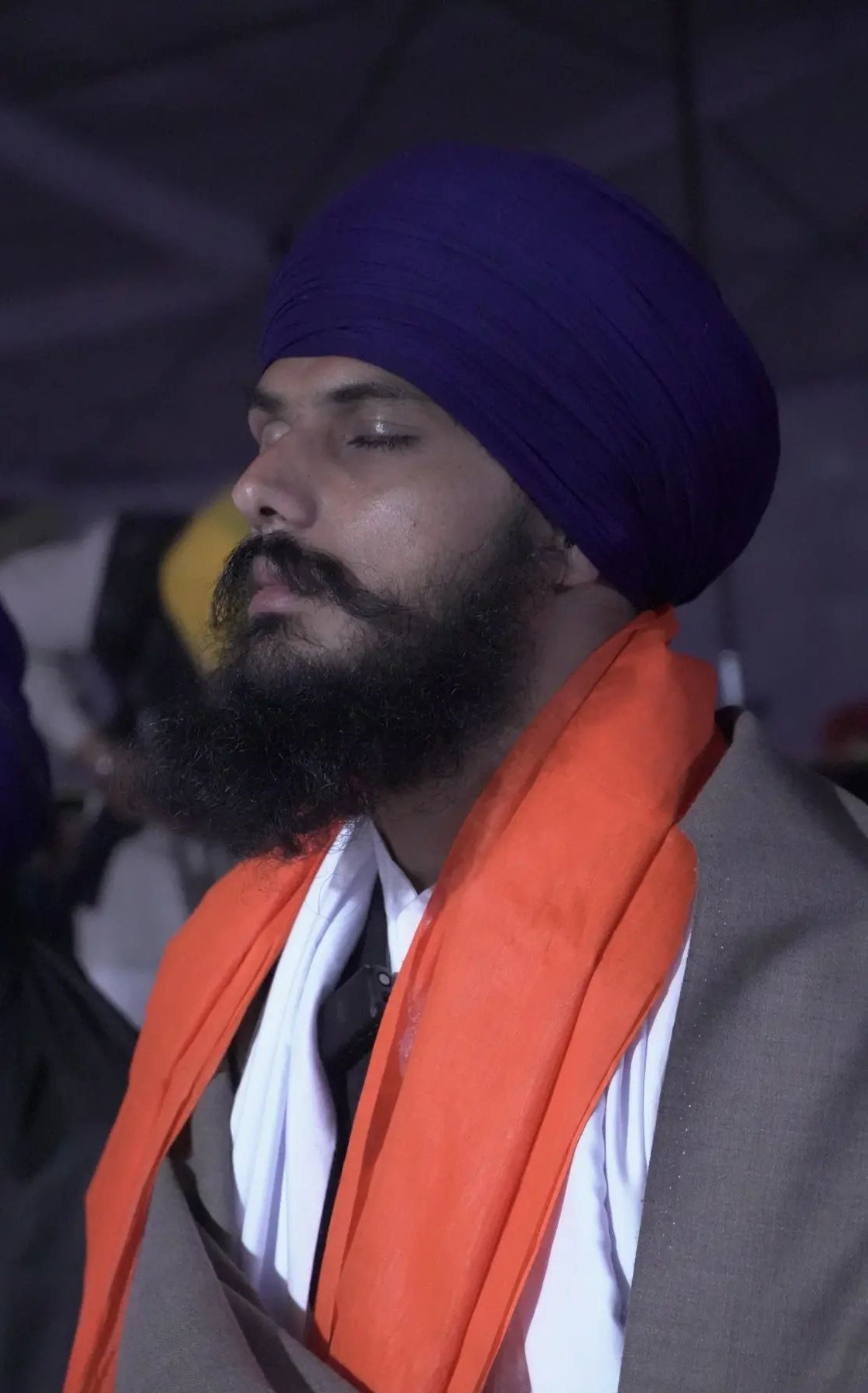
Photograph of Amritpal Singh Sandhu

Amritpal Singh took over as leader of the organization after the death of its founder in an automobile accident. It is rumoured that Deep Sidhu and Amritpal Singh had never actually met in real life and only interacted over social media. The family of Deep Sidhu have questioned Singh's claim to leadership. A letter appeared on a Facebook account of Waris Punjab De on 4 March 2022 appointing Amritpal as the organisation's leader. The appointment remains controversial. According to some sources, Sidhu had appointed Harnek Singh Uppal as the head of the organisation even while he was alive. So Sidhu's death did not make a difference to the organisation. A break-away faction of the organisation apparently chose Amritpal as its leader using a "hacked" Facebook account, while the original organisation has continued under Uppal (now called the "Deep Sidhu faction").

After the coming of leadership of Amritpal Singh, the mission of the organization has shifted towards the aims of "follow the tenets of Sikhism" and "establish Khalsa Raj". The organization supported the Shiromani Akali Dal (Amritsar) in the 2022 Punjab Legislative Assembly election. It launched a movement to promote Sikhs to undergo the Amrit Sanskar initiation ceremony into the Khalsa order, condemned drug usage and addiction, and practices such as dowry, through tours throughout the state of Punjab in November 2022. On 23 February 2023, clashes between supporters of the group and police broke out in Ajnala, Punjab. The group was criticized for carrying Guru Granth Sahib, the holy scripture of the Sikhs, during the clashes, with some arguing that it was used as a "shield". The body has been accused of being funded by the Pakistani ISI.

==== Crackdown ====
On 18 March 2023, Indian authorities launched a manhunt for Singh after he was accused by police of attempted murder, obstruction of law enforcement and creating "disharmony" in society. During the manhunt, Indian authorities deployed thousands of paramilitary police and restricted Internet and mobile messaging services for nearly 30 million people across the Punjab state.

Indian authorities also arrested more than 200 people while conducting a massive manhunt. Meanwhile, Singh was nowhere to be found. After more than a month, on 23 April 2023, Singh was arrested from Rode village in Moga district, Punjab. Later, he was taken to the high-security Dibrugarh jail in Assam state.

On 16 March 2025, the Government of Punjab announced that seven of the detained aides of Amritpal Singh will be transferred from Dibrugarh Jail in Assam to Punjab, where they will face trial for their involvement in the 23 February 2023 clashes in Ajnala. This will follow the end of their detention under the National Security Act, commonly abbreviated as NSA. The individuals to be transferred include Bhagwant Singh Bajeke 'Pardhan Mantri', Kulwant Singh Rauke, Daljit Singh Kalsi, Basant Singh, Gurmeet Singh Bukkanwal, Gurinderpal Singh Aujla, and Harjit Singh. On March 25 2025, Punjab Police took custody of an eighth aide, Varinder Singh Fauji, and transferred him to Punjab to seek trial.

== List of Jathedars ==
Sr. No.	Name	Portrait	Term start	Term end	Time in office
1.	Deep Sidhu		September 2021	15 February 2022	138 days
2.	Amritpal Singh		29 September 2022	Incumbent	4 years, 36 days

== Political entrance ==
In the 2024 Lok Sabha election, Waris Panjab De leader Amritpal Singh contested from the Khadoor Sahib constituency while behind bars in Dibrugarh Jail over NSA charges. He ended up victorious, winning with a lead of nearly 200,000 votes, setting a record in Punjab. Amritpal Singh had contested as an Independent candidate, though with the support of Shiromani Akali Dal (Amritsar).

After multiple Punjab Vidhan Sabha members were elected into the Lok Sabha, their constituencies become vacant. Along with this progression, multiple Waris Panjab De members imprisoned in Dibrugarh Jail under the NSA had signalled a potential follow in the footsteps of Amritpal Singh, announcing to contest the By-Elections of vacant seats in the Vidhan Sabha. As of 30 June 2024, Bhagwant Singh Bajeke had announced that he would contest from Gidderbaha, Kulwant Singh Rauke from Barnala, and Daljeet Singh Kalsi from Dera Baba Nanak Assembly constituency.. However, the family of Daljeet Singh Kalsi, as well as the families of the other speculated candidates, later on announced that the respective members of Waris Panjab De would not contest the by-elections.

On January 14th 2024, at Mela Maghi, occurring at Sri Muktsar Sahib, Member of Parliament for Khadoor Sahib Amritpal Singh's family members, along with Member of Parliament for Faridkot Sarabjeet Singh Khalsa, announced a new political party to better represent the views of Punjab's Sikh community. This party was founded under the name Akali Dal (Waris Punjab De), and would act as an alternative to the pre-existing and controversial Shiromani Akali Dal. Despite multiple speculations that he would be released to attend the event, Amritpal Singh was not allowed to attend due to his imprisonment. Amritpal Singh's father Tarsem Singh will be given the responsibility as the political party's Acting President.
