= Amritpal Singh =

Indian Sikh leader (born 1993)

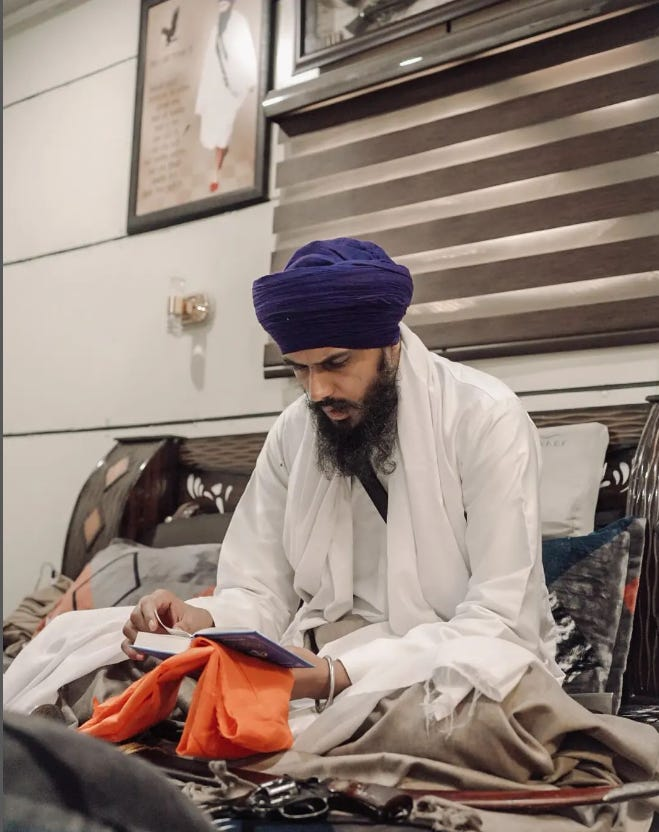
- Singh in 2022

2nd Jathedar of Waris Punjab De
- Incumbent
- Assumed office 29 September 2022
- Preceded by: Deep Sidhu

Member of Parliament, Lok Sabha
- Incumbent
- Assumed office 4 June 2024
- Preceded by: Jasbir Singh Gill
- Constituency: Khadoor Sahib, Punjab

President of Akali Dal (Waris Punjab De)
- Incumbent
- Assumed office 14 January 2025

Personal details
- Born: Amritpal Singh Sandhu; 17 January 1993 (age 33) Jallupur Khera, Punjab, India
- Party: Akali Dal (Waris Punjab De)
- Spouse: Kirandeep Kaur (m. 2023)
- Occupation: Politician; preacher
- Known for: Khalistani separatism

Amritpal Singh Sandhu (born 17 January 1993) is an Indian politician, Sikh preacher and pro-Khalistan separatist. He is a Member of the Indian Parliament in the Lok Sabha representing the constituency of Khadoor Sahib since 2024. He is currently serving as leader of Indian political party Akali Dal (Waris Punjab De) since 14 January 2025 and Sikh organisation Waris Punjab De since 29 September 2022.

After living in Dubai for a decade, he returned to Punjab in September 2022, appointed as the leader of Waris Punjab De; he started an anti-drugs campaign, encouraging the youth to adopt a traditionalist form of Sikhism and advocated for a sovereign Sikh state in Punjab called Khalistan.

Indian intelligence sources claim that Singh has been supported by the Inter-Services Intelligence (ISI), and that he has stockpiled arms while raising a private militia called Anandpur Khalsa Fauj (AKF). In March 2023, the state government, acting in coordination with the central government, launched an intense crackdown on Singh and his associates. He was arrested on 23 April 2023 under the National Security Act (India). The NSA detention was lifted on 22 April 2026.

== Early life ==
Amritpal Singh Sandhu was born on 17 January 1993, in Jallupur Khera, a village in the Baba Bakala tehsil of Amritsar district of Punjab, India. He was the youngest of the three children of Tarsem Singh and Balwinder Kaur. His family is said to be very religious. His uncle Harjit Singh Sandhu was the sarpanch (head of village) for 10 years before moving to the United Kingdom.

After passing the 10th class, Amritpal enrolled in a diploma course in mechanical engineering at Lord Krishna Polytechnic College in Kapurthala in 2009. He dropped out after three years, never having completed the course.

In 2012, he moved to Dubai in UAE to join his family's transport business. His LinkedIn profile claimed that he has a mechanical engineering degree from the University of Punjab. His profile further claimed that he was the "Operations Manager" at a company called Sandhu Cargo Transport and that he had experience in transportation, trucking and railroad industry. According to The Indian Express, he worked as a dispatcher for about ten years. Some sources state that he was a truck driver. However, many details of his time in Dubai for the rest of the decade remain unknown.

Amritpal often spoke about issues concerning Punjab on social media. In 2019, he started supporting the farmers' protest and also became a vocal supporter of Deep Sidhu. His social media reach multiplied after he got associated with Sidhu. He travelled to India to support the protest. At that time, he was a Sahajdhari. After the farm laws were withdrawn, he returned to Dubai.

== Waris Punjab De ==
During the farmers' protest, the actor-turned-activist Deep Sidhu attempted to broaden the agenda of the agitation into fighting for the "rights of Punjab". Amritpal is said to have been a vocal supporter of Sidhu and his role in the agitation. Sidhu is alleged to have led a group of farmers to storm the Red Fort in Delhi on the Republic Day of 2021. He was arrested for the action and spent a few months in prison. After getting released on bail, he founded the Waris Punjab De ("Heirs of Punjab") organisation to fight for what he termed the rights of Punjab.

Amritpal also became a part of Waris Punjab De, remotely from Dubai. Others have said that Sidhu did not appreciate the "Khalistani" slant of Amritpal and blocked him from the audio discussion forum during the farmers' protests. Sidhu is also said to have blocked Amritpal's phone from his personal contacts in February 2022.

In Dubai, Amritpal Singh is claimed by Indian authorities to have come in contact with Pakistan's Inter-Services Intelligence (ISI), which has supported the Khalistan movement in the past. (Note: Pakistan's geopolitical dimensions behind the Khalistan movement have been traced by Canadian journalist Terry Milewski.) He was in touch with Jaswant Singh Rode, a nephew of Bhindranwale and brother of Lakhbir Singh Rode who runs the International Sikh Youth Federation from Lahore, and a Babbar Khalsa militant called Paramjit Singh Pamma. Through them, he is said to have gotten in touch with Avtar Singh Khanda, a UK-based Sikh activist belonging to Shiromani Akali Dal (Amritsar), whose father is a member of the Khalistan Liberation Force. According to Indian intelligence, Khanda then groomed Amritpal Singh to be a Khalistan activist, including sending him to Georgia for training. (Note: Khanda was arrested by British police in March for vandalising the Indian embassy in London. Lakhbir Singh Rode is booked in India for smuggling drugs and explosives across the border from Pakistan.) (Note: Amritpal's stay in Georgia from 11 June 2022 and 20 August 2022 was stamped on his Indian passport.)

=== Succession to Deep Sidhu ===
After the sudden death of Deep Sidhu in February 2022, a letter appeared on a Facebook account of Waris Punjab De on 4 March 2022 appointing Amritpal as the organisation's leader. The appointment remains controversial. According to some sources, Sidhu had appointed Harnek Singh Uppal as the head of the organisation even while he was alive. So Sidhu's death did not make a difference to the organisation. A break-away faction of the organisation apparently chose Amritpal as its leader using a "hacked" Facebook account, while the original organisation has continued under Uppal (now called the "Deep Sidhu faction"). Sidhu's family disowned Amritpal and called for an investigation into his antecedents.

Amritpal returned to Punjab in August 2022 with a flowing beard and turban. He gave up his role in the family's business and also his permanent resident status in Canada. In September, he got baptised at Anandpur Sahib in front of a larger gathering. A week later, a dastarbandi (turban tying ceremony) was held for him in the Rode village in Moga district, the native place of former militant leader Jarnail Singh Bhindranwale. By this time, Amritpal Singh was already being treated as a big leader. He was lodged in the house of the sarpanch (head of village) and a long line of people came to see him. His dastarbandi served as his inauguration as the head of Waris Punjab De, amid slogans of "Khalistan Zindabad".

In his inauguration speech, Amritpal said that the Sikhs had been slaves for 150 years, first to the British and later to the "Hindus". The only way to be totally free is to have "Sikh rule". Passing 15 resolutions including one saying that nobody could "interfere" with Sikh affairs, he declared a "fight for freedom". "Our waters are being looted", "our Guru is being desecrated", "factories encroached into our land", "our groundwater has depleted", "our turbans are being disrespected", and "the head of our nation calls us keshdhari (long-haired) Hindus". These were all alleged to be signs of slavery.

=== Campaigning and Prachaar ===
Soon after his initiation, Amritpal Singh started a campaign to motivate youth to shun drugs and irreligious (patit) lifestyle, calling them to the gurdwaras to receive baptism (amrit-sanchaar). His efforts received praise from religious authorities. An official of the Akal Takht said that, whereas normally they would receive around 200 youth for baptism on a Sunday, Amritpal's efforts resulted in over 1,000 people coming. Amritpal has visited the outlying regions of Sikhism such as Sri Ganganagar in Rajasthan and places in Haryana, and he is also said to have attracted people from far away places such as Delhi, Maharashtra and Jammu.

Later in November, he started a Khalsa Vaheer tour (religious procession to spread the Sikh belief) through the state of Punjab, to motivate youth to take up Khalsa (pure Sikh order). He marched from Amritsar to Anandpur Sahib over the period of a month. He was accompanied by supporters carrying automatic guns and bullets. During the events, he is reported to have preached radical views, glorifying weapons and violence. By the end of December, he had baptised more than 3000 youth, with the alleged motive of inducting them into Khalistan activism.

=== Drug rehabilitation ===
Amritpal opened up a drug rehab facility and many, such as local journalists Amandeep Sandhu and Sandeep Singh (the latter having interviewed Amritpal in Dubai), attribute his wide popularity to his willingness to tackle social issues head-on, such as the drug problem, when previous governments have failed to solve these issues. Drug addiction and abuse are serious issues in Punjab, a study by the Postgraduate Institute of Medical Education and Research (PGIMER) in 2022 revealed around 15.4% of the state's population of 30 million were narcotic users.

Indian security agencies have stated that, although he presented himself as an anti-drug activist, he was in contact with people in Dubai and London who were involved in smuggling drugs into Punjab. He was suspected of using his drug de-addiction centers to set up hideouts and storehouses for weapons being smuggled from Pakistan using drones.

An investigative report by India Today found that the "drug rehabilitation" centers indulged in several irregularities, including administering random pills to inmates and beating those who attempted to leave the center. Police footage showed a number of illegal firearms being seized from the center. The police accused him of using the centers to rope in drug addicts into his private militia, the Anand Khalsa Fauj.

Incongruously, his brother was arrested in 2024 in a drug case in Phillaur town for carrying methamphetamine, and a dope test confirmed positive results.

=== Early controversies ===
In October 2022, in one of his speeches, Amritpal said, "Jesus who could not save himself, how he will save everyone else?" which was termed hate speech by members of the Christian community. The Christian community staged a four hours-long protest against Amritpal at PAP Chowk for his remarks about Jesus Christ. The protesters demanded that an FIR should be lodged against him under 295A of the IPC (Indian Penal Code) for "hurting religious sentiments and attempting to aggravate communal divisions".

In 2022, several Punjabi and Sikh women alleged that Amritpal orchestrated an online bullying and harassment attack after they criticized their views on him, feminism and patriarchy in Sikhism and Punjab. The women faced online trolling, stalking and harassment which forced them to reduce or stop their online presence and activism altogether. Their complaints and call have largely been unresolved. An article about the same was published by Gurmehar Kaur in April 2023.

On 7 October, the Twitter account of Amritpal was withheld in India for his remarks and pro-Khalistani tweets. The Ministry of Home Affairs also instructed the state government of Punjab to remain vigilant over his activities.

With Amritpal's Facebook account already being suspended, his Instagram account was suspended on 25 February 2023. In retaliation, Amritpal supporters clashed with the police, resulting in six policemen being injured.

In February 2023, a man complained in an Ajnala police station stating he was kidnapped and beaten by the associates of Amritpal. An FIR was registered against Amritpal and his associates. The police arrested one of his close associates, Lovepreet Singh "Toofan". After the arrest, Amritpal issued an "ultimatum" to Punjab Police to revoke the case and, when the police did not respond, his supporters broke through police barricades and stormed the police complex, armed with automatic guns and sharp weapons. Several police personnel were injured and police vehicles were damaged. Amritpal had styled their group like a Jatha carrying the Guru Granth Sahib in a palki sahib and used the holy book as a cover to infiltrate and to force the police into using acquiescent tactics. Punjab police later released Lovepreet Singh after the court ordered his release based on the police report. Amritpal's wielding of the Guru Granth Sahib as a shield was condemned by scholars and the Sikh clergy alike. According to Pathankot Superintendent of Police Harpal Singh Randhawa, the police had to stand down to avoid committing sacrilege of the holy book.

=== Khalistan and Bhindranwale styling ===
Amritpal openly supports the cause of Khalistan, the separatist movement calling for a separate homeland/country for people of Sikh faith. He has given several statements in which he openly rallies for Khalistan stating, "Our aim for Khalistan shouldn't be seen as evil and taboo. It should be seen from an intellectual point of view as to what could be its geopolitical benefits. It's an ideology and ideology never dies. We are not asking for it from Delhi". He further stated in a separate instance that the Khalistan sentiment will remain in the population and that no one can suppress it. He threatened Union Home Minister Amit Shah, saying that he will meet the same fate as Indira Gandhi, who was assassinated by her Sikh bodyguards in 1984.

Singh has stated that Khalistani militant Jarnail Singh Bhindranwale, who was killed in Operation Blue Star in 1984, is his hero. He dresses and presents himself in a similar manner, wearing a turban and traditional robes and moving with heavily armed men around him. He also entered the Golden Temple with a group of armed men called Faujaan. A minority of his supporters have referred to him as a second Bhindranwale.

== Political career ==
=== Member of Parliament ===
In May 2024, Singh decided to run as an independent candidate for the Khadoor Sahib constituency of Punjab in the Lok Sabha elections. His campaign was led by his family and supporters due to his detention in Assam's Dibrugarh Jail under the National Security Act.

On 4 June 2024, Singh won the elections from Khadoor Sahib and was elected as a Member of the Lok Sabha by defeating his nearest competitor, Kulbir Singh Zira of the Indian National Congress by a margin of 197,120 votes. This victory marked the largest win by votes and the widest margin in the history of the Khadoor Sahib constituency.

He was granted a 4-day parole on 5 July 2024 to take oath as MP. He travelled from Dibrugarh to New Delhi under high police security for his oath as the member of the 18th Lok Sabha.

== Crackdown and arrest ==
On 18 March, the Punjab Police initiated a crackdown against Waris Punjab De, arresting 78 persons and detaining several others for questioning. (Note: The eventual number of arrests was reported as 112.) Amritpal Singh was wanted for attempted murder, obstruction of law enforcement and creating disharmony in society and was reported to be absconding. The crackdown happened one day prior to a planned Khalsa Vaheer programme by Amritpal from Muktsar district. In the hunt to arrest him, the police set up road blocks around the region, and were involved in a car chase, but he managed to escape. He switched cars and changed clothes to avoid detection during the chase, eventually escaping on a motor cycle. He, along with his uncle and an associate, allegedly threatened the family of a sarpanch and forcefully stayed at their house. The police recovered the vehicles used and a .315 rifle stashed in one of them. The uncle and associate were also arrested.

Waris Punjab De filed a habeas corpus plea in the Punjab and Haryana High Court alleging the police had already detained him illegally. The government of Punjab rejected this claim and informed the High Court that they are close to catching Amritpal Singh. Amritpal and four of his associates were charged under the National Security Act (NSA). In the process of this manhunt, more than 200 people, including direct aides of Amritpal were arrested. In Amritsar, a "hue and cry notice" was issued to identify the whereabouts of Singh.

Mobile internet services in Punjab were suspended and text messaging services were disabled during the weekend, until the afternoon of 21 March, affecting 27 million people. In few districts, the restrictions were extended till 23 March. Gatherings of more than four people were prohibited in Chandigarh under Section 144 of the Criminal Procedure Code. The Indian government also requested Twitter withhold 122 accounts linked to Amritpal Singh or Waris Punjab De. These accounts were withheld.

After 11 days of hideout on 29 March Amritpal Singh released a video urging the Sikh collective to gather for a Sarbat Khalsa.

On 23 April, after being on the run for 35 days, Amritpal was arrested from Rode Village in Moga, Punjab. He was then sent to Dibrugarh central jail in Assam under NSA.

=== Allegations and charges ===
Indian intelligence agencies allege that he has links to Pakistan's Inter-Services Intelligence and global Khalistan terror groups. He has been trained by the ISI in Georgia to execute a separatist agenda, according to them. Photographs of Khalistani flags, emblems, currency, guns marked "A.K.F" (Anandpur Khalsa Fauj), videos of firing range and WhatsApp groups of A.K.F. were discovered from the phone of a close aide of Amritpal, Tajinder Singh Gill, aka "Gorkha Baba". Dubious deposits to the tune of nearly 40 Crore INR mostly from foreign sources were detected in the accounts of multiple members of Waris De Punjab. The agencies' reports claim that he has been raising his own army and 'human bomb squads' consisting of brainwashed youth as suicide bombers idolising Dilawar Singh.

=== Reactions ===
==== Domestic ====
Jathedar of the Akal Takht, Giani Harpreet Singh, accused the authorities of "creating an atmosphere of terror in the state". Journalists, politicians, and celebrities who criticised the heavy-handed response of the government have had their social media accounts blocked in India. The Shiromani Gurdwara Parbandhak Committee has demanded the police "stop arresting innocent Sikh youth".

Political opposition leader Sukhbir Singh Badal, president of the Shiromani Akali Dal, denounced the actions of the Aam Aadmi Party (AAP) government accusing it of "indiscriminately" arresting "innocent Amritdhari Sikh youth". Arvind Kejriwal, leader of AAP, praised the local ruling AAP state government and its leader, Bhagwant Mann, for the crackdown, stating the state government was not afraid of taking hard decisions against criminal activity.

Sikh protestors in Mohali blocked a major intersection and demanded to know the whereabouts of Amritpal. Amritpal's father, Tarsem Singh, alleged that the authorities were targeting his son due to his anti-drug mission.

==== International ====
Diasporic Sikhs protested the actions of the authorities against Amritpal. A mob of protesters attacked the Indian consulate in San Francisco, another mob attacked the Indian High Commission office in London and attempted to pull down the Indian flag off the pole, broke windows and inflicted minor injuries on security staff. The NIA has claimed that a group of protestors in San Francisco were exhorted to kill all representatives of the Indian government. Further, two people poured flammable material in the entrance of the consulate and attempted to set the building on fire.

In Canada, Sikh groups attacked the Indian High Commission in Ottawa and threw two grenades into the building, according to the Ministry of Home Affairs. Amritpal Singh's brother in law, Amarjot Singh, has been named as the primary accused in the attack. Some reports stated they were smoke grenades.

In Washington, D.C., Khalistani supporters verbally intimidated and physically assaulted an Indian journalist covering the protests. In Surrey, another journalist was allegedly assaulted and harassed by Khalistani supporters. The Indian Ambassador to the US, Taranjit Singh Sandhu, was threatened with assassination by Khalistanis.

However, peaceful protests by Sikhs without incident took place in Auckland in New Zealand.

British Sikh Labour MP, Tanmanjeet Singh Dhesi criticised the government's actions. Concerns about the situation were also raised by Canadian Sikh MPs. Canadian-Sikh politician, Jagmeet Singh asked the Canadian government to raise concerns with their Indian counterparts regarding suspension of civil liberties. A number of Sikh MPs in Canada who expressed support for Amritpal Singh regarding the situation in India's Punjab claimed to have received threatening messages over social media.

== Personal life ==
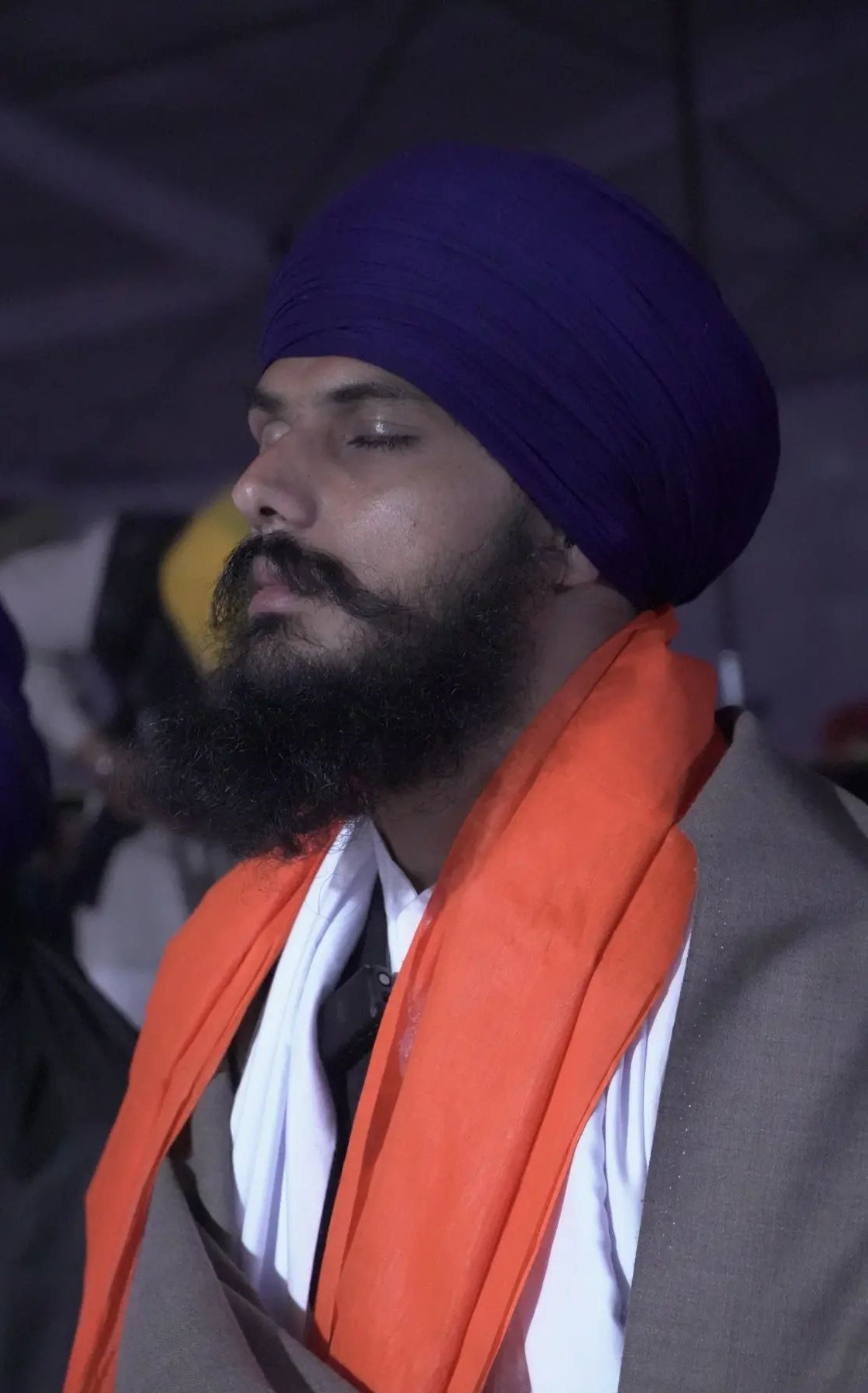
Photograph of Amritpal Singh

On 10 February 2023, Amritpal married Kirandeep Kaur, a native of Jalandhar district who used to live in the United Kingdom. Amritpal described it as an instance of "reverse migration" and encouraged Punjabis to return to Punjab and settle there. As of March 2023, she resides in Jallupur Khera, the native village of Amritpal Singh. She was barred from boarding a flight to England in 3 months after the arrest of her husband in 2023.

== Electoral Performance ==
2024 Indian general election: Khadoor Sahib
Party	Candidate	Votes	%	±%
IND	Amritpal Singh	404,430	38.62	New
INC	Kulbir Singh Zira	207,310	19.80	▼24.15
AAP	Laljit Singh Bhullar	194,836	18.61	▲17.30
SAD	Virsa Singh Valtoha	86,416	8.25	▼22.26
BJP	Manjit Singh Mianwind	86,373	8.25	New
Margin of victory		197,120	18.82	▲5.38
Turnout		1,047,165		
Independent gain from INC		Swing		
