= Manjinder Singh Lalpura =

Indian politician

MLA, Punjab
- Incumbent
- Assumed office 2022
- Constituency: Khadoor Sahib
- Majority: Aam Aadmi Party

Personal details
- Party: Aam Aadmi Party

Manjinder Singh Lalpura is an Indian politician and the MLA representing the Khadoor Sahib Assembly constituency. He is a member of the Aam Aadmi Party. He was found guilty and convicted of molesting a Dalit woman.

== Member of Legislative Assembly ==
He represents the Khadoor Sahib Assembly constituency as MLA in Punjab Assembly. The Aam Aadmi Party gained a strong 79% majority in the sixteenth Punjab Legislative Assembly by winning 92 out of 117 seats in the 2022 Punjab Legislative Assembly election. MP Bhagwant Mann was sworn in as Chief Minister on 16 March 2022.

Committee assignments of Punjab Legislative Assembly

- Member (2022–23) Committee on Public Undertakings
- Member (2022–23) Committee on Petitions

== Assets and liabilities declared during elections ==
During the 2022 Punjab Legislative Assembly election, he declared Rs. 57,27,200 as an overall financial asset and Rs. 1,00,000 as financial liability.

== Convicted in molestation charges ==
On September 11, 2025, a Tarn Taran district court, led by Additional Sessions Judge Prem Kumar, found AAP MLA Manjinder Singh Lalpura, along with 10 others, guilty in a molestation and assault case dating back to September 4, 2013, involving a 19-year-old Dalit teenager. This included six policemen among the accused. The incident occurred during a wedding and involved molestation and assault by a taxi driver (Lalpura) and others, followed by further assault by police officers. A video of the assault circulated widely, prompting the Supreme Court to take suo motu cognizance and order protection for the survivor and her family.

Immediately after the verdict, eight of the accused, including Lalpura, were arrested and taken into custody. Three others remain at large.

The court sentenced him and several others to four years of imprisonment for their involvement in the case of molestation and assault of a 19-year-old Dalit teenager.

== Electoral performance ==
Punjab Assembly election, 2022: Khadoor Sahib
Party	Candidate	Votes	%	±%
AAP	Manjinder Singh Lalpura	55,756	38.7	
INC	Ramanjit Singh Sikki	39,265	27.2	
SAD	Ranjit Singh Brahmpura	38,532	26.7	
SAD(A)	Jaswant Singh Sohal	5,473	3.8	
NOTA	None of the above	1,059	0.5	
Majority		16,491	11.35	
Turnout		145,256	71.4	
Registered electors		203,539		

State Legislative Assembly
Preceded by -	Member of the Punjab Legislative Assembly from Khadoor Sahib Assembly constituency 2022 –	Incumbent
