= Punjab Assembly Committee on Agriculture and its allied activities =

Indian Legislative committee

Committee on Agriculture and its allied activities
Committee of the House
- 16th Punjab Assembly
- State: Punjab

Leadership
- Chaiperson: Gurpreet Singh Banawali
- Chairperson party: Aam Aadmi Party
- Appointer: Punjab Assembly speaker

Structure
- Seats: 12
- Political Parties: AAP (9); INC (2); SAD (1)
- Election criteria: The members are elected every year from amongst its members of house according to the principle of proportional representation.
- Tenure: 1 Year

Jurisdiction
- Purpose: Legislative oversight of the Agriculture and its allied activities

Rules & Procedure
- Applicable rules: Article 208 of the Constitution of India section 32 of the States Reorganisation Act, 1956; Rules 232(1) and 2(b) of Rules of Procedure and Conduct of Business in Punjab Legislative Assembly

Punjab Assembly Committee on Agriculture and its allied activities of Punjab Legislative Assembly is constituted annually for a one year period from among the members of the Assembly. This Committee consists of twelve members.

== Appointment ==
The speaker appoints the committee and its members every year for a one year term according to the powers conferred by Article 208 of the Constitution of India read with section 32 of the States Reorganisation Act, 1956 (37 of 1956), and in pursuance of Rules 232(1) and 2(b) of the Rules of Procedure and Conduct of Business in the Punjab Legislative Assembly.

== Members ==
For the one year period starting May 2022, the Committee on Agriculture and its allied activities of 16th Punjab Assembly had following members:

Committee on Agriculture and its allied activities (2022–23)
Sr. No.	Name	Post	Party
1	Gurpreet Singh Banawali	Chairperson	AAP
2	Amritpal Singh Sukhanand	Member	AAP
3	Chetan Singh Jouramajra	Member	AAP
4	Dalbir Singh Tong	Member	AAP
5	Ganieve Kaur Majithia	Member	SAD
5	Rana Gurjeet Singh	Member	INC
6	Hardeep Singh Mundian	Member	AAP
7	Jasvir Singh Raja Gill	Member	AAP
8	Jaswant Singh Gajjanmajra	Member	AAP
9	Kulwant Singh Bazigar	Member	AAP
10	Neena Mittal	Member	AAP
11	Sandeep Jakhar	Member	INC
12	Sarvan Singh Dhun	Member	AAP

== Chairpersons ==
Tenure	Terms	Name	Political party
2021-22	1	Ramanjit Singh Sikki	Indian National Congress
2022-23	1	Gurpreet Singh Banawali	Aam Aadmi Party

== Previous members ==
=== 2021–22 ===
Committee on Agriculture and its allied activities (2021–22)
Sr. No.	Name	Post	Party
1.	Ramanjit Singh Sikki	Chairperson	INC
2.	Amarjit Singh Sandoa	Member	AAP
3.	Angad Singh	Member	INC
4.	Avtar Singh Junior	Member	INC
5.	Gurpartap Singh Wadala	Member	SAD
5.	Gurpreet Singh Kangar	Member	INC
6.	Kuljit Singh Nagra	Member	INC
7.	Madan Lal Jalalpur	Member	INC
8.	Nazar Singh Manshahia	Member	INC
9.	Parkash Singh Badal	Member	SAD
10.	Rajinder Singh	Member	INC
11.	Sadhu Singh Dharamsot	Member	INC
12.	Sukhjit Singh	Member	INC
