= Sarvan Singh Dhun =

Indian politician

Member of the Punjab Legislative Assembly
- Incumbent
- Assumed office 2022
- Preceded by: Sukhpal Singh Bhullar
- Constituency: Khem Karan

Personal details
- Party: Aam Aadmi Party

Sarvan Singh Dhun is an Indian politician and the MLA in the Punjab Legislative Assembly representing the Khem Karan Assembly constituency in Punjab, India, since 2022. He is a member of the Aam Aadmi Party.

== Member of Legislative Assembly ==
He represents the Khem Karan Assembly constituency as MLA in Punjab Assembly. The Aam Aadmi Party gained a strong 79% majority in the sixteenth Punjab Legislative Assembly by winning 92 out of 117 seats in the 2022 Punjab Legislative Assembly election. MP Bhagwant Mann was sworn in as Chief Minister on 16 March 2022.

Committee assignments of Punjab Legislative Assembly

- Member (2022–23) Committee on Public Undertakings
- Member (2022–23) Committee on Agriculture and its allied activities

== Assets and liabilities declared during elections ==
During the 2022 Punjab Legislative Assembly election, he declared Rs. 1,93,05,683 as an overall financial asset and Rs. 32,97,054 as financial liability.

== Electoral performance ==
Assembly election, 2022: Khemkaran
Party	Candidate	Votes	%	±%
AAP	Sarvan Singh Dhun	64,541	41.64	
SAD	Virsa Singh Valtoha	52,659	33.98	
INC	Sukhpal Singh Bhullar	28,859	18.62	
SAD(A)	Harpal Singh Baler	3,270	2.11	
NOTA	None of the above	1,832	1.18	
SAD(S)	Daljit Singh Gill	422	0.27	New
Majority		11,882	7.66	
Turnout		1,54,988	71.08	
Registered electors		218,055		
AAP gain from INC		Swing		

State Legislative Assembly
Preceded by -	Member of the Punjab Legislative Assembly from Khem Karan Assembly constituency 2022 –	Incumbent
