= Jasbir Singh Gill =

Indian politician

Member of Parliament, Lok Sabha
- In office 23 May 2019 – 4 June 2024
- Preceded by: Ranjit Singh
- Succeeded by: Amritpal Singh
- Constituency: Khadoor Sahib

Member of Punjab Legislative Assembly
- In office 24 February 2002 – 27 February 2007
- Preceded by: Manmohan Singh
- Succeeded by: Manjinder Singh
- Constituency: Beas

Sarpanch of Lidhar
- In office 1982–1997
- Constituency: Lidhar, Amritsar

Personal details
- Born: 8 November 1968 (age 57) Rayya, Amritsar, Punjab
- Party: Indian National Congress
- Spouse: Ramanbir Kaur
- Children: 2
- Parent(s): Sant Singh; Satwiinder Kaur
- Education: Guru Nanak Dev University (Giani)
- Nickname: Dimpa

Jasbir Singh Gill is an Indian politician and was a Member of Parliament to the 17th Lok Sabha from Khadoor Sahib (Lok Sabha constituency) of Punjab, India. He won the Indian general election 2019 as an Indian National Congress candidate. In the year 2002 he was elected to the Punjab Legislative Assembly from Beas. In December 2020, he was in an issue with young female reporter questioning him about the farmers' protest live on TV.

== Early life and education ==
Jasbir Singh Gill was born on 8 November 1968 in Amritsar, Punjab. He is son of Satwiinder Kaur Gill and late Sant Singh Liddar. His father was a member of Punjab legislative assembly (1985 - 1986) from Beas constituency and died fighting terrorists on 26 April 1986, Gill was 18 years old when he narrowly escaped from this attack. He completed his primary schooling from Saint Francis School Amritsar and later joined Shivalik public school, Chandigarh. In 1987, militants injured him while he was going to his native village. In 1988, he graduated from Guru Nanak Dev University, Amritsar. In a later attack in 1989 at his native village Liddar, terrorists killed all seven guards at his house but he narrowly escaped and survived. All these attacks happened during the Punjab insurgency period. he has two brothers Sh Harmanbir Singh Gill, IPS and Mr Rajan Gill MD

== Early political career ==
He was first elected as Sarpanch of Lidhar village of Punjab in 1982. In late 1992 after the relative peace in Punjab, he was re-elected as village Sarpanch of Lidhar. He later went on to serve as the president of Punjab Youth Congress from 1997 to 1999 and as General Secretary of Indian Youth Congress from 1999 to 2005.

== Legislative assembly ==
Jasbir Singh Gill contested his first assembly election from Beas constituency, Amritsar in 1997 but lost to Manmohan Singh Sathiala. Jasbir singh Gill won his first assembly election from Beas (renamed as Baba Bakala in 2012) in 2002. He defeated Manjinder Singh Kang from Shiromani Akali Dal (SAD) by a margin of 6450 votes and became a member of the Punjab legislative assembly. During his tenure, he also became the chairmen Punjab water supply and sewerage board for the period 2003-2007. He also served as chairmen of Public accounts, Estimates, and Petition Committee of Punjab Vidhan Sabha. In the next assembly election, he lost his seat to Manjinder Singh Kang by a narrow margin of 4179 votes. In 2012 he contested from Amritsar South but lost to Inderbir Singh Bolaria of Shiromani Akali Dal with a Margin 15056 votes.

== Member of parliament ==
He filed his nomination from the Khadoor Sahib constituency for a four-way battle between Shiromani Akali Dal (Taksali), Shiromani Akali Dal, Punjab Ekta Party, and the Indian National Congress. Gill defeated his closest rival Bibi Jagir Kaur of the Shiromani Akali Dal (SAD) by a margin of 140573 votes. He has emerged as a vocal leader in the Parliament and has recently asked (alongside Vincent H Pala) a Starred Question to the Home Affairs about the existence of controversial "Tukde Tukde Gang". The Minister of State for Home G Kishan Reddy said "the ministry has no information on any such group". In his first year as MP he has received approval for a Government Medical College in Kapurthala and a Law University in Patti.

=== Performance in parliament ===
Performance in the Lok Sabha, 2019-20

MP performance parameters (2019–20)	Jasbir Singh Gill
Attendance in Parliament	96%, against State average 76% and National average 84%
Questions Raised	37, against State average 29 and National average 49
Debates Participated	27, against a State average 14.3 and National average 16.5
Private Member Bills	0, against State average 0 and National average 0.3

=== Parliamentary committees ===
He was a member of the Standing Committee on Personnel, Public Grievances and Law and Justice and Member of Consultative Committee, Ministry of Petroleum and Natural Gas.

=== Election results ===
2019 General Election: Khadoor Sahib
Party	Candidate	Votes	%	±%
INC	Jasbir Singh Gill	459710	43.95	
SAD	Bibi Jagir Kaur	319137	30.51	
PEP	Paramjit Kaur Khalra	214489	20.51	
Majority		140573		
Turnout		1046032		
INC gain from SAD		Swing	{{{swing}}}	

== Awards ==
Silver medal in the Duke of Edinburgh's Award for increasing health awareness.
