= Dalbir Singh Tong =

Indian politician

MLA, Punjab
- Incumbent
- Assumed office 2022
- Constituency: Baba Bakala
- Majority: Aam Aadmi Party

Personal details
- Party: Aam Aadmi Party

Dalbir Singh Tong is the MLA from Baba Bakala Assembly constituency. He is a member of the Aam Aadmi Party.

== Member of Legislative Assembly ==
He represents the Baba Bakala Assembly constituency as MLA in Punjab Assembly. The Aam Aadmi Party gained a strong 79% majority in the sixteenth Punjab Legislative Assembly by winning 92 out of 117 seats in the 2022 Punjab Legislative Assembly election. MP Bhagwant Mann was sworn in as Chief Minister on 16 March 2022.

Committee assignments of Punjab Legislative Assembly

- Member (2022–23) Committee on Welfare of Scheduled Castes, Scheduled Tribes and Backward Classes
- Member (2022–23) Committee on Agriculture and its allied activities

== Assets and liabilities declared during elections ==
During the 2022 Punjab Legislative Assembly election, he declared Rs. 27,82,812 as an overall financial asset and Rs. nil as financial liability.

== Electoral performance ==
Punjab Assembly election, 2022: Baba Bakala
Party	Candidate	Votes	%	±%
AAP	Dalbir Singh Tong	52,468	39.98	▲9.83
INC	Santokh Singh Bhalaipur	32,916	25.08	▼10.11
SAD	Baljit Singh Jalal	30,969	23.6	▼5.69
BJP	Manjeet Singh Manna Mianwind	5,366	4.09	New
SAD(A)	Natha Singh	4,310	3.28	New
Independent	Gurnam Kaur	2,520	1.92	New
NOTA	None of the above	931	0.71	▲0.04
Majority		19,552	14.9	
Turnout		1,31,237		
Registered electors		1,99,929		
AAP gain from INC		Swing		

State Legislative Assembly
Preceded by -	Member of the Punjab Legislative Assembly from Baba Bakala Assembly constituency 2022 –	Incumbent
