= Amritpal Singh Sukhanand =

Indian politician

MLA, Punjab Legislative Assembly
- Incumbent
- Assumed office 2022
- Preceded by: Darshan Singh Brar
- Constituency: Bhagha Purana
- Majority: Aam Aadmi Party

Personal details
- Party: Aam Aadmi Party

Amritpal Singh Sukhanand is an Indian politician and the MLA representing the Bhagha Purana Assembly constituency in the Punjab Legislative Assembly. He is a member of the Aam Aadmi Party. He was elected as the MLA in the 2022 Punjab Legislative Assembly election.

== MLA ==
The Aam Aadmi Party gained a strong 79% majority in the sixteenth Punjab Legislative Assembly by winning 92 out of 117 seats in the 2022 Punjab Legislative Assembly election. MP Bhagwant Mann was sworn in as Chief Minister on 16 March 2022.

Committee assignments of Punjab Legislative Assembly

- Member (2022–23) House Committee
- Member (2022–23) Committee on Agriculture and its allied activities

== Electoral performance ==
Punjab Assembly election, 2022: Bhagha Purana
| Party | Candidate | Votes | % | ±% |
|---|---|---|---|---|
| AAP | Amritpal Singh Sukhanand | 67,143 | 50.9 | |
| SAD | Tirath Singh Mahla | 33,384 | 25.3 | |
| INC | Darshan Singh Brar | 18,042 | 13.7 | |
| Independent | Bhola Singh Brar | 8,702 | 6.6 | |
| SAD(S) | Jagtar Singh Rajeana | 3,267 | 2.5 | |
| NOTA | None of the above | 1,170 | 0.7 | |
| Majority | | 33,759 | 25.34 | |
| Turnout | | 133,222 | 77.1 | |
| Registered electors | | 172,846 | | |

State Legislative Assembly
| Preceded by - | Member of the Punjab Legislative Assembly from Bhagha Purana Assembly constituency 2022 – | Incumbent |
