= Beas Assembly constituency =

Former constituency of the Punjab Legislative Assembly

Coordinates: 31.52°N 75.29°E

Beas
- Former constituency No. 12 for the Punjab Legislative Assembly

Constituency details
- Country: India
- State: Punjab
- District: Amritsar
- Lok Sabha constituency: Amritsar
- Established: 1951
- Abolished: 2012
- Total electors: 143,643 (2002)
- Reservation: None

Beas was a Punjab Legislative Assembly constituency till 2012.

== Members of the Legislative Assembly ==
Year	Member	Party
1951	Sohan Singh	Indian National Congress
1957	Sohan Singh	Indian National Congress
1962	Sohan Singh	Indian National Congress
1964^	Kartar Singh	Independent
1967	Sohan Singh	Indian National Congress
1969	Hari Singh	Shiromani Akali Dal
1972	Sohan Singh	Indian National Congress
1977	Jiwan Singh Umranangal	Shiromani Akali Dal
1980	Jiwan Singh Umranangal	Shiromani Akali Dal
1985	Sant Singh	Indian National Congress
1992	Vir Pawan Kumar	Indian National Congress
1997	Manmohan Singh Sathiala	Shiromani Akali Dal
2002	Jasbir Singh Gill	Indian National Congress
2007	Manjinder Singh Kang	Shiromani Akali Dal

^Bypoll

== Election results ==
Year	A C No.	Name	Party	Votes	Runner Up	Party	Votes
2007	25	Manjinder Singh Kang	SAD	53014	Jasbir Singh Gill (Dimpa)	INC	48835
2002	12	Jasbir Singh Gill	INC	45832	Manjinder Singh Kang	SAD	39382
1997	12	Manmohan Singh Sathiala	SAD	36775	Jasbir Singh Gill	INC	26741
1992	12	Vir Pawan Kumar	INC	3636	Kulwant Singh	IND	3107
1985	12	Sant Singh	INC	25564	Sukhdev Singh Umranangal	SAD	22651
1980	12	Jiwan Singh Umranangal	SAD	31225	Gurdial Singh Dhillon	INC(I)	29533
1977	12	Jiwan Singh Umara Nangal	SAD	30368	Sohan Singh Jallal Usman	INC	20414
1972	21	Sohan Singh	INC	24477	Wihhian Singh	SAD	16295
1969	21	Hari Singh	SAD	25433	Sohan Singh	INC	22750
1967	21	Sohan Singh	INC	20401	Kartar Singh	IND	12148
1962	122	Kartar Singh	IND	22662	Sohan Singh	INC	21391
1962	By Polls in 1964	Sohan Singh	INC	22623	Gurbachan Singh	IND	18615
1957	75	Sohan Singh	INC	19425	Makhan Singh	CPI	8738
1951	97	Sohan Singh	INC	16732	Avtar Singh	SAD	13877

== See also ==
- Baba Bakala Assembly constituency
