= Bhagha Purana Assembly constituency =

Legislative Assembly constituency in Punjab State, India

Coordinates: 30.69°N 75.1°E

Bhagha Purana
- Constituency No. 72 for the Punjab Legislative Assembly

Constituency details
- Country: India
- State: Punjab
- District: Moga
- Lok Sabha constituency: Faridkot
- Total electors: 172,120 (in 2022)
- Reservation: None

Member of Legislative Assembly
- 16th Punjab Legislative Assembly
- Incumbent Amritpal Singh Sukhanand
- Party: Aam Admi Party
- Elected year: 2022

Bhagha Purana Tehsil Assembly constituency (Sl. No.: 72) is a Punjab Legislative Assembly constituency in Moga district, Punjab state, India.

== Members of the Legislative Assembly ==
Most successful parties from Bhagha Purana Vidhan Sabha
1. INC (6 Times) (35.3%)
2. SAD (6 Times) (35.3%)
3. AAP (1 Time) (5.88%)
4. AD – SFS (1 Time) (5.88%)
5. CPI (1 Time) (5.88%)
6. JD (1 Time) (5.88%)
7. LCPHU (1 Time) (5.88%)

Year	Member	Party
1951	Bachan Singh	Lal Communist Party Hind Union
1957	Gurmit Singh	Indian National Congress
1957	Sohan Singh	Indian National Congress
1962	Deedar Singh	Communist Party of India
1967	C. Singh	Akali Dal – Sant Fateh Singh Group
1969	Tej Singh	Indian National Congress
1972	Gurcharan Singh	Indian National Congress
1977	Tej Singh	Shiromani Akali Dal
1980	Tej Singh	Shiromani Akali Dal
1985	Malkiat Singh Sidhu	Shiromani Akali Dal
1992	Vijay Kumar	Janata Dal
1997	Sadhu Singh Rajeana	Shiromani Akali Dal
2002	Sadhu Singh Rajeana	Shiromani Akali Dal
2007	Darshan Singh Brar	Indian National Congress
2012	Maheshinder Singh	Shiromani Akali Dal
2017	Darshan Singh Brar	Indian National Congress
2022	Amritpal Singh Sukhanand	Aam Aadmi Party

== Election results ==
=== 2027 ===
Punjab Assembly election, 2027: Bhagha Purana
Party	Candidate	Votes	%	±%
AAP	Amritpal Singh Sukhanand			
AD (WPD)				New entry
INC				
BSP				
SAD				
BJP				New entry
NOTA	None of the above			
Majority				
Turnout				

=== 2022 ===
Punjab Assembly election, 2022: Bhagha Purana
Party	Candidate	Votes	%	±%
AAP	Amritpal Singh Sukhanand	67,143	50.9	
SAD	Tirath Singh Mahla	33,384	25.3	
INC	Darshan Singh Brar	18,042	13.7	
Independent	Bhola Singh Brar	8,702	6.6	
SAD(S)	Jagtar Singh Rajeana	3,267	2.5	
NOTA	None of the above	1,170	0.7	
Majority		33,759	25.34	
Turnout		133,222	77.1	
Registered electors		172,846		

=== 2017 ===
Punjab Assembly election, 2017: Bhagha Purana
Party	Candidate	Votes	%	±%
INC	Darshan Singh Brar	48,668	35.33	
AAP	Gurbinder Singh Kang	41418	30.07	
SAD	Tirath Singh Mahla	41283	29.97	
Independent	Parminder Singh	3631	2.64	
BSP	Mander Singh	871	0.63	
National Adhikar Insaf Party	Nirmal Singh	610	0.44	{{{change}}}
Ojaswi Party	Sukhdev Raj	372	0.27	{{{change}}}
NOTA	None of the above	897	0.65	
Registered electors		168,398		

=== Previous results ===
Year	A C No.	Name	Party	Votes	Runner Up	Party	Votes
2012	72	Maheshinder Singh	SAD	63703	Darshan Singh Brar	INC	53129
2007	99	Darshan Singh Brar	INC	54624	Sadhu Singh Rajiana	SAD	51159
2002	100	Sadhu Singh Rajeana	SAD	47425	Mahesh Inder Singh	INC	42378
1997	100	Sadhu Singh Rajeana	SAD	45869	Maheshinder Singh	INC	41496
1992	100	Vijay Kumar	JD	3615	Gur Charan Singh	INC	3607
1985	100	Malkiat Singh Sidhu	SAD	29471	Darshan Singh Brar	INC	20617
1980	100	Tej Singh	SAD	25694	Avtar Singh Brar	INC	25571
1977	100	Tej Singh	SAD	29665	Gurdeep Singh	INC	22776
1972	15	Gurcharan Singh	INC	24986	Tej Singh	SAD	23450
1969	15	Tej Singh	INC	28865	Gurcharan Singh	SAD	24869
1967	15	C. Singh	ADS	22170	C. Singh	INC	17027
1962	87	Deedar Singh	CPI	23432	Sohan Singh	INC	18882
1957	64	Sohan Singh	INC	44808	Arjan Singh	CPI	28275
1957	64	Gurmit Singh	INC	44477	Bachan Singh	CPI	28090
1951	76	Bachan Singh	LCP	9038	Mukand Singh	SAD	6867
