= Ravinder Singh Brahmpura =

Indian politician

Member of the Punjab Legislative Assembly
- Incumbent
- Assumed office (By-election) 13-2-2016
- Preceded by: Ramanjit Singh Sikki
- Succeeded by: Ramanjit Singh Sikki
- Constituency: Khadoor Sahib Assembly Constituency

Personal details
- Party: Shiromani Akali Dal
- Occupation: Politician

Ravinder Singh Brahampura is an Indian politician from the state of Punjab.

== Constituency ==
Brahmpura represented the Khadoor Sahib Assembly Constituency of Punjab.

== Political Party ==
Brahmpura had left Shiromani Akali Dal in 2018 along with other members and joined Shiromani Akali Dal (Taksali) which later merged into Shiromani Akali Dal (Sanyukt). In December 2021, he along with his Maternal Uncle Ranjit Singh Brahmpura and other members of Shiromani Akali Dal (Sanyukt) rejoined Shiromani Akali Dal.
