= Jassi Khangura =

Indian politician

MLA, Punjab
- In office 2007–2012
- Preceded by: Jagdish Singh Garcha
- Succeeded by: Constituency underwent Boundary delimitation
- Constituency: Qila Raipur

Personal details
- Born: 17 November 1963 (age 62) Latala, Ludhiana District, Punjab
- Party: Indian National Congress
- Website: http://www.jassikhangura.com

Jassi Khangura(Jasbir Singh Khangura) is a social entrepreneur, businessman and politician. He is member of Indian National Congress. He was Member of the Punjab Legislative Assembly from 2007 to 2012 and represented Qila Raipur constituency. He is a former British national and returned to India in 2006.

== Early life ==
He was born on 17 November 1963 at Latala, Ludhiana District, Punjab. His father's name Jagpal Singh Khangura. He married Raman daughter of Congress leader Gurinder Singh Kairon and granddaughter of ex-Chief Minister of Punjab Pratap Singh Kairon. He has two children Sabina and Jaibir.

== Business ==
He has invested in Macro Dairy Ventures Pvt Ltd a large scale milk production venture. He is the owner of Hotel Park Plaza Ludhiana.

== Political career ==
He was member of the Labour Party while in the United Kingdom. In 2007, he was elected from Qila Raipur constituency as member of the Punjab Legislative Assembly.
