= Balwinder Singh Bhunder =

Indian politician

Working President Shiromani Akali Dal
- Incumbent
- Assumed office 29 August 2024
- President: Sukhbir Singh Badal

Member of Parliament, Rajya Sabha
- In office 2010 – 2022
- Preceded by: Raj Mohinder Singh Majitha
- Succeeded by: Balbir Singh Seechewal
- Constituency: Punjab
- In office 1998 – 2002
- Preceded by: Virendra Kataria
- Succeeded by: Gurcharan Kaur
- Constituency: Punjab

Cabinet Minister, Government of Punjab
- In office 1977 – 1980
- Cabinet: Second Badal ministry
- Chief Minister: Parkash Singh Badal
- Ministry and Departments: Agriculture; Forest; Soil Conservation

Member of Punjab Legislative Assembly
- In office 2002 – 2007
- Preceded by: Ajit Inder Singh
- Succeeded by: Ajit Inder Singh
- Constituency: Sardulgarh
- In office 1972 – 1992
- Preceded by: Kirpal Singh
- Succeeded by: Kirpal Singh
- Constituency: Sardulgarh

Personal details
- Born: 20 September 1944 (age 81) Sardulgarh, Punjab, British India
- Party: Shiromani Akali Dal
- Spouse: Balwant Kaur
- Children: Dilraj Singh Bhunder, Balraj Singh Bhunder

Balwinder Singh Bhunder (born 20 September 1944) is an Indian politician, former member of the Rajya Sabha, from the state of Punjab, and is the Working President of Shiromani Akali Dal.

He is a member of the Shiromani Akali Dal party. He served as the Cabinet Minister for Agriculture, the Cabinet Minister for Forest and the Cabinet Minister for Soil Conservation from 1977 to 1980. He has held former positions of General Secretary of Shiromani Akali Dal, President of All India Kisan Sabha and Member of the Legislative Assembly from Sardulgarh, Mansa district.

== Early life ==
Bhunder was born in the village of Bhunder, Sardulgarh, Mansa district, in the state of Punjab, to Sardar Boota Singh and Shrimati Surjit Kaur.

== Biography ==
Bhunder married Shrimati Balwant Kaur. They had two sons, Balraj Singh Bhunder and Dilraj Singh Bhunder. Balraj Singh Bhunder died in 2007 at the age of 40. Balraj was the National General Secretary of the Youth Wing, Youth Akali Dal. Dilraj Singh Bhunder is an MLA from Sardulgarh, Mansa district.

== Political career ==
Bhunder started his political career when he was elected the Village Sarpanch from 1964 to 1972. He was then elected to be a member of the Punjab Legislative Assembly from the Sardulgarh, Mansa District constituency for 4 consecutive terms; 1972–1977, 1977–1980, 1980-1982 and 1982–1987. During which he served as the Cabinet Minister for Agriculture, the Cabinet Minister for Forest and the Cabinet Minister for Soil Conservation.

From 1997 to 1999, Bhunder served as the Chairman of the Agricultural Marketing Board. In 1998, he was elected to the Rajya Sabha, the upper house of the Parliament of India. From 2002 to 2007, Bhunder was again elected to be a member of the Punjab Legislative Assembly from the Sardulgarh, Mansa District constituency for the 5th time. Since then, he has served as a member of Consultative Committee for the Ministry of Agriculture, Civil Supplies and Public Distribution, and the Committee of Food.

Bhunder was again elected as a member of the Rajya Sabha in 2010 and 2016 as well. Since then, he has also served as a member of Committee to the Wakf (Amendment) Bill, Committee on Water Resources, Committee on Subordinate Legislation, and the Committee of Rajya Sabha on the Mines and Minerals (Development and Regulation) Amendment Bill. Bhunder was appointed as the Secretary General of Shiromani Akali Dal in June 2020.
