= Sardulgarh Assembly constituency =

Legislative Assembly constituency in Punjab State, India

Coordinates: 29.7°N 75.24°E

Sardulgarh
- Constituency No. 97 for the Punjab Legislative Assembly

Constituency details
- Country: India
- State: Punjab
- District: Mansa
- Lok Sabha constituency: Bathinda
- Total electors: 182,806
- Reservation: None

Member of Legislative Assembly
- 16th Punjab Legislative Assembly
- Incumbent Gurpreet Singh Banawali
- Party: Aam Aadmi Party
- Elected year: 2022

Sardulgarh Assembly constituency is one of the 117 Legislative Assembly constituencies of Punjab state in India. It is part of Mansa district.

== Members of the Legislative Assembly ==
Most successful parties from Sardulgarh Vidhan Sabha
1. SAD (8 Times) (53.3%)
2. INC (4 Times) (26.7%)
3. AAP (1 Time) (6.67%)
4. AD – SFS (1 Time) (6.67%)
5. SAD (A) (1 Time) (6.67%)

Year	Member	Party
As part of PEPSU Legislative Assembly (1951–56)
1952	Inder Singh	Shiromani Akali Dal
1954	Pritam Singh	Shiromani Akali Dal
Constituency defunct (1956-1967)
As part of Punjab Legislative Assembly (1967–Present)
1967	H. Singh	Akali Dal – Sant Fateh Singh Group
1969	Kirpal Singh	Indian National Congress
1972	Balwinder Singh Bhunder	Shiromani Akali Dal
1977	Balwinder Singh Bhunder	Shiromani Akali Dal
1980	Balwinder Singh Bhunder	Shiromani Akali Dal
1985	Balwinder Singh Bhunder	Shiromani Akali Dal
1992	Kirpal Singh	Indian National Congress
1997	Ajit Inder Singh	Shiromani Akali Dal (Amritsar)
2002	Balwinder Singh Bhunder	Shiromani Akali Dal
2007	Ajit Inder Singh	Indian National Congress
2012	Ajit Inder Singh	Indian National Congress
2017	Dilraj Singh Bhunder	Shiromani Akali Dal
2022	Gurpreet Singh Banawali	Aam Aadmi Party

== Election results ==
=== 2027 ===
Punjab Assembly election, 2027: Sardulgarh
Party	Candidate	Votes	%	±%
AAP	Gurpreet Singh Banawali			
AD (WPD)				New entry
INC	Gursharan Makha			
BSP				
SAD				
BJP				
NOTA	None of the above			
Majority				
Turnout				

=== 2022 ===
Punjab Assembly election, 2022: Sardulgarh
Party	Candidate	Votes	%	±%
AAP	Gurpreet Singh Banawali	75,817	49.61	
INC	Bikram Singh Mofar	34,446	22.54	
SAD	Dilraj Singh Bhunder	31,757	20.78	
SAD(A)	Baldev Singh	2,345	1.53	
BJP	Jagjit Singh Milkha	2,038	1.33	
NOTA	None of the above	684	0.45	
Majority		41,371	27.07	
Turnout		152,822	83.6	
Registered electors		183,788		
AAP gain from SAD		Swing		

=== 2017 ===
Punjab Assembly election, 2017: Sardulgarh
Party	Candidate	Votes	%	±%
SAD	Dilraj Singh Bhunder	59,420	38.7	
INC	Ajit Inder Singh	50,563	32.9	
AAP	Sukhwinder Singh (BHOLA MANN)	38,102	24.8	
NOTA	None of the above	1,062	0.6	
Majority		8,857	5.8	
Turnout		152,600	88.8	
Registered electors		173,068		

=== 1997 ===
Punjab Assembly election, 1997: Sardulgarh
Party	Candidate	Votes	%	±%
SAD(A)	Ajit Inder Singh	45,152	46.14	New entry
SAD	Balwinder Singh	42,035	42.95	
INC	Sukhwinder Singh	8,509	8.70	
CPI(M)	Lal Chand	2,164	2.21	
Majority		3,117		
Turnout		97,860	79.94	
Registered electors		124,201		

== See also ==
- List of constituencies of the Punjab Legislative Assembly
- Mansa district, India
