= Baba Bakala Assembly constituency =

Legislative Assembly constituency in Punjab State, India

Coordinates: 31.56°N 75.26°E

Baba Bakala
- Constituency No. 25 for the Punjab Legislative Assembly

Constituency details
- Country: India
- State: Punjab
- District: Amritsar
- Lok Sabha constituency: Khadoor Sahib
- Total electors: 199,929 (in 2022)
- Reservation: SC

Member of Legislative Assembly
- 16th Punjab Legislative Assembly
- Incumbent Dalbir Singh Tong
- Party: Aam Aadmi Party
- Elected year: 2022

Baba Bakala is a Punjab Legislative Assembly constituency in Amritsar district, Punjab state, India.

== Members of the Legislative Assembly ==
Most successful parties from Baba Bakala Vidhan Sabha
1. SAD (1 Time) (33.3%)
2. INC (1 Time) (33.3%)
3. AAP (1 Time) (33.3%)

Year	Member	Party
2012	Manjit Singh Mianwind	Shiromani Akali Dal
2017	Santokh Singh Bhalaipur	Indian National Congress
2022	Dalbir Singh Tong	Aam Aadmi Party

== Election results ==
=== 2027 ===
Punjab Assembly election, 2027: Baba Bakala
Party	Candidate	Votes	%	±%
AAP				
AD (WPD)				New entry
INC				
BSP				
SAD				
BJP				
NOTA	None of the above			
Majority				
Turnout				

=== 2022 ===
Punjab Assembly election, 2022: Baba Bakala
Party	Candidate	Votes	%	±%
AAP	Dalbir Singh Tong	52,468	39.98	▲9.83
INC	Santokh Singh Bhalaipur	32,916	25.08	▼10.11
SAD	Baljit Singh Jalal	30,969	23.6	▼5.69
BJP	Manjeet Singh Manna Mianwind	5,366	4.09	New entry
SAD(A)	Natha Singh	4,310	3.28	New entry
Independent	Gurnam Kaur	2,520	1.92	New entry
NOTA	None of the above	931	0.71	▲0.04
Majority		19,552	14.9	
Turnout		131,237		
Registered electors		199,929		
AAP gain from INC		Swing		

=== 2017 ===
Punjab Assembly election, 2017: Baba Bakala
Party	Candidate	Votes	%	±%
INC	Santokh Singh Bhalaipur	45,965	35.19	▲9.21
AAP	Dalbir Singh Tong	39,378	30.15	New entry
SAD	Malkiat Singh	38,265	29.29	▼21.16
RMPI	Amrik Singh	2,925	2.24	New entry
APP	Baljit Sing Bhatti	1,174	0.9	New entry
Democratic Swaraj Party	Kamaljit Singh	1,071	0.82	New entry
BSP	Swinder Singh	974	0.75	New entry
NOTA	None of the above	876	0.67	
Registered electors		188,189		
INC gain from SAD		Swing		

=== 2012 ===
Punjab Assembly election, 2012: Baba Bakala
Party	Candidate	Votes	%	±%
SAD	Manjit Singh Mianwind	60,244	50.45	New entry
INC	Ranjit Singh Chhajjalwadi	31,019	25.98	New entry
Independent	Baljit Singh Bhatti	17,090	14.31	New entry
Independent	Gurnam Singh Daud	4,707	3.94	New entry
PPoP	Satwinder Singh Sarli	2,108	1.77	New entry
Majority		29,225	24.47	
Turnout		119,408	71.93	

== See also ==
- Beas Assembly constituency
