= Ajit Inder Singh =

Politician from Punjab, India

Ajit Inder Singh Mofar

Member of Punjab Legislative Assembly
- In office 2007–2017
- Preceded by: Balwinder Singh Bhunder
- Succeeded by: Balwinder Singh Bhunder
- Constituency: Sardulgarh
- In office 1997–2002
- Preceded by: Kirpal Singh
- Succeeded by: Balwinder Singh Bhunder
- Constituency: Sardulgarh

Personal details
- Born: 18 August 1951 (age 74) Sardulgarh, Punjab, British India
- Party: Indian National Congress
- Other political affiliations: Shiromani Akali Dal (Amritsar)
- Children: Bikram Singh Mofar

Ajit Inder Singh Mofar (born August 18, 1951) is an Indian politician and former Member of the Punjab Legislative Assembly who represented the Sardulgarh Assembly constituency in Mansa district. He served three terms as MLA, first elected in 1997 on a Shiromani Akali Dal (Amritsar) ticket, and later in 2007 and 2012 as a candidate of the Indian National Congress.

Mofar's son, Bikram Singh Mofar, has followed in his father's political footsteps, serving as the District Congress Committee President and contesting the 2022 Punjab Legislative Assembly election from Sardulgarh.

State Legislative Assembly
Preceded by Balwinder Singh Bhunder	Member of the Punjab Legislative Assembly from Sardulgarh Assembly constituency 2007 – 2017	Succeeded by Balwinder Singh Bhunder
