= Qila Raipur =

Qila Raipur ਕ਼ਿਲਾ ਰਾਏਪੁਰ Kila Raipur
- Village
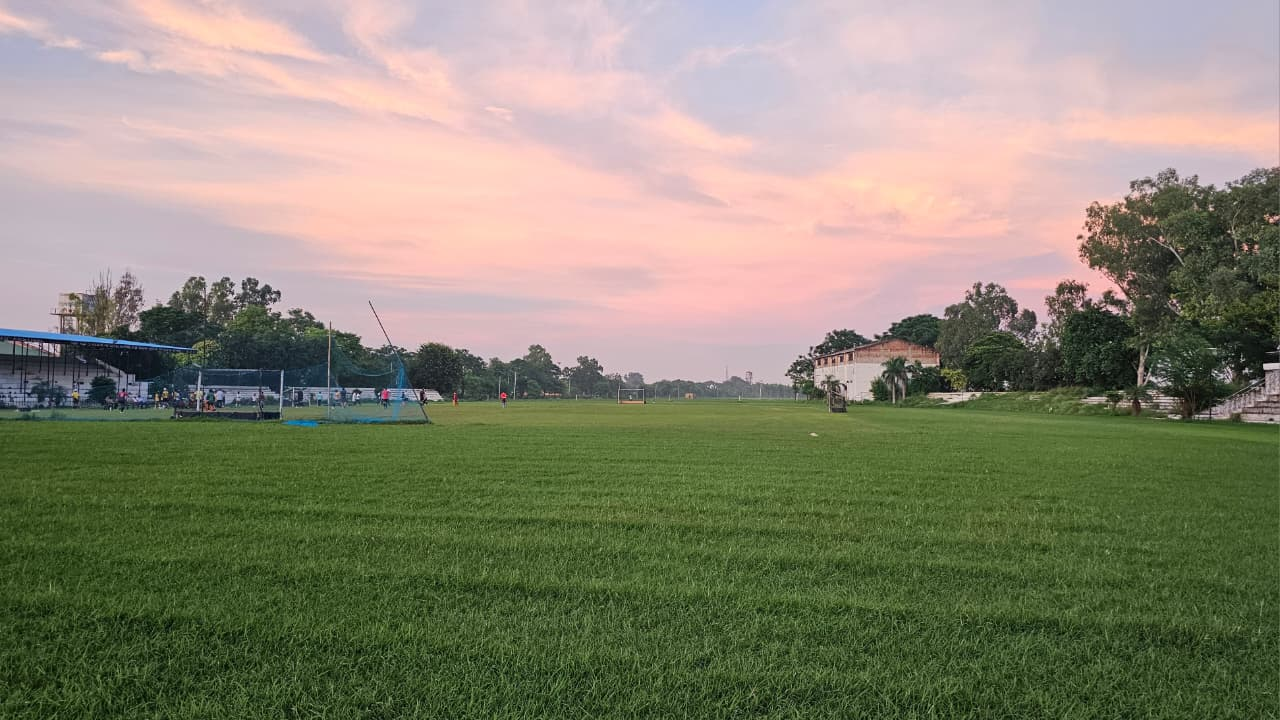
- Nickname: Rural Olympics
- Location in Punjab, India Qila Raipur (India)
- Coordinates: 30.762°N 75.8228°E
- Country: India
- State: Punjab
- District: Ludhiana
- Established: 1560 A.D.
- Founder: Rai Lala
- Named for: Rai Lala

Government
  - Type: Gram panchayat

Population (2011)
  - Total: 6,205
- Demonym: Raipuri

Languages
  - Official: Punjabi, Hindi, English
  - Regional: Punjabi
- Time zone: UTC+5:30 (IST)
- PIN: 141201
- Telephone code: 0161-123456
- Vehicle registration: PB 10/ PB 91
- Nearest city: Ludhiana

Qila Raipur (also spelled as Kila Raipur) is a noted village of Ludhiana district in Punjab, India, as it hosts the annual Qila Raipur Sports Festival, known as the Rural Olympics. The events played often demonstrate the physical strength and valor of the Punjabi men and women.

== Etymology ==
The name of the settlement, Qila Raipur, is derived from the Hindi word for fort क़िला qila, as well as Rai Lala, the founder the settlement; it included a series of defensive fortresses that were built to secure it, to which it owes its namesake.

== Geography ==
The village is approximately centered at 30°45′43″N 75°49′22″E and located only 19 km away from Ludhiana city.

== Transportation ==
Qila Raipur is well connected by road and rail as a railway station is located in the village, trains going to Jalandhar, Ferozepur, Dhuri, and Delhi pass through the station regularly. The village is well connected with daily or weekly trains to most places in India including the major cities and towns such as Ludhiana, Dhuri, Hisar, Mathura, Lehragaga, Ahmedgarh, Gill, Baddowal, Rohira etc. The railway station was established during British rule, it was also the time when the village got its official name. The village is situated on Pakhowal - Sahnewal Road and the Malerkotla - Ludhiana highway is also very close to the village. The nearest airport is Shaheed Kartar Singh Sarabha International Airport, Halwara.

== Education ==
Qila Raipur village has higher literacy rate compared to Punjab as a whole. In 2011, the literacy rate of Qila Raipur village was 79.30 % compared to 75.84 % of Punjab. In Qila Raipur, the male literacy stands at 82.83 % while the female literacy rate was 75.49 %.

The village has a total of five schools:

- Nankana Sahib Senior Secondary Public School (established in 1986), upto 12th class. It is managed by the Grewal Education Society and Nankana Sahib Education Trust.
- Khalsa Girls High School, a government aided school.
- Government Senior Secondary School, for 6th to 12th classes.
- Government Primary School (Boys) upto 5th class.
- Government Primary School (Girls) upto 5th class.

== Administration ==
It is governed by a local gram panchayat of 11 members each representing a single ward.

It is a part of Gill Assembly constituency and Ludhiana Lok Sabha constituency.

=== Politics ===
The Sarpanch (village head) is Mrs. Jasvir Kaur. About 50% wards are represented by women and about 33% wards are represented by SC community. The latest panchayat election was held in October 2024 and it was non-partisan (i.e. candidates did not contest on official party symbols). In the block samiti election held in 2025, Aam Aadmi Party candidate won with a margin of 220 votes closely followed by Congress candidate and the Shiromani Akali Dal candidate was distant third.

== See also ==
- Raipur, Mansa
- Ludhiana
