= Dilraj Singh Bhunder =

Indian politician

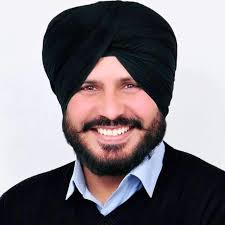

Member of Legislative Assembly, Punjab
- In office 2017 - 2022
- Constituency: Sardulgarh, Mansa District, Punjab, India

Vice President, Youth Wing, Shiromani Akali Dal
- In office 2012 - 2017

Zila Parishad Chairman
- In office 2008 - 2012
- Constituency: Sardulgarh, Mansa District, Punjab, India

Personal details
- Party: Shiromani Akali Dal
- Spouse: Veerpal Kaur
- Parents: Balwinder Singh Bhunder (father); Balwant Kaur (mother)
- Relatives: Balraj Singh Bhunder (Brother)

Dilraj Singh Sidhu is an Indian politician, former member of the Punjab Legislative Assembly or the Punjab Vidhan Sabha. He is the son of Sardar Balwinder Singh Bhunder, who is currently a member of the Rajya Sabha, the upper house of the Parliament of India, from the state of Punjab. Dilraj is a member of the Shiromani Akali Dal party. He is a former Vice President of Youth Wing Shiromani Akali Dal party. Dilraj is an engineering graduate from Punjab Engineering College, Chandigarh.

== Early life ==
Dilraj was born on 11 January 1969 in Bathinda, Punjab, to Sardar Balwinder Singh Bhunder and Shrimati Balwant Kaur. He spent his early life living and schooling in Chandigarh. Dilraj had a strong interest in engineering and science since his childhood. He was an avid athlete growing up and competed in 5 national Volleyball games and was the youngest caption to ever had to play in nationals.

== Biography ==
Dilraj married Veerpal Kaur in 1994. Dilraj's deceased brother, Balraj Singh Bhunder was previously an important political figure for the Shiromani Akali Dal party.

== Political career ==
From 2008 to 2012, Dilraj became the Zila Parishad Chairman, Mansa. From 2012 to 2017, he was the Vice President of the Youth Wing for the Shiromani Akali Dal party. Dilraj was elected as a member of the Punjab Legislative Assembly or the Punjab Vidhan Sabha from Sardulgarh, Mansa District, Punjab, India.

Dilraj has been actively been a part of many committees including the Committee on Petitions of Punjab Vidhan Sabha, Committee of Local Bodies & Panchayati Raj Institution of Punjab Vidhan Sabha, and the Library Committee.
