= Sukhpal Singh Bhullar =

Indian politician from Punjab

Punjab Legislative Assembly
- Incumbent
- Assumed office 2017
- Preceded by: Virsa Singh
- Constituency: Khemkaran South Assembly constituency

Personal details
- Born: 24 June 1978 (age 47)
- Party: Indian National Congress
- Profession: Politician

Sukhpal Singh Bhullar (24 June 1978) is an Indian politician and a member of Indian National Congress. In 2017, he was elected as the member of the Punjab Legislative Assembly from Khemkaran South Assembly constituency.

== Constituency ==
Singh Bhullar represents the Khemkaran South Assembly constituency. Singh Bhullar won the Khemkaran South Assembly constituency on an Indian National Congress ticket, he beat the member of the Punjab Legislative Assembly Virsa Singh of the Shiromani Akali Dal by over 19602 votes.

== Political party ==
Singh Bhullar is from the Indian National Congress and he is also the MLA of Khemkaran South Assembly constituency.
