= Manjit Singh Mianwind =

Indian politician

MLA, Punjab
- In office 2002 - 2012
- Preceded by: Ranjit Singh
- Succeeded by: Ramanjit Singh Sikki
- Constituency: Khadoor Sahib
- In office 2012 - 2017
- Preceded by: New Constituency
- Constituency: Baba Bakala

Personal details
- Party: Bharatiya Janata Party (2022-present)
- Other political affiliations: Shiromani Akali Dal (till 2022)

Manjit Singh Manna Mianwind is an Indian politician and belongs to Bharatiya Janata Party. He was a member of the Punjab Legislative Assembly and represented Baba Bakala Assembly constituency. He joined the BJP before 2022 Punjab election and received ticket from Baba Bakala as a BJP candidate. In April 2024, he was named as the BJP candidate for Khadoor Sahib in the ensuing 2024 Indian general election in Punjab.

== Family ==
His father's name is Mohinder Singh.

== Political career ==
Mianwind was elected to Punjab Legislative Assembly from Khadoor Sahib in 2002. In 2007, he was re-elected from Khadoor Sahib. In 2012, he successfully campaigned in the new constituency Baba Bakala.
