= Ramanjit Singh Sikki =

Indian politician

Ramanjit Singh Sahota

MLA, Punjab
- In office 2012 - 2016, 2017- 2022
- Preceded by: Ravinder Singh Brahmpura
- Constituency: Khadoor Sahib

Personal details
- Party: Indian National Congress
- Children: 3

Ramanjit Singh Sikki is an Indian politician and belongs to the Indian National Congress. He is a member of the Punjab Legislative Assembly and represents Khadoor Sahib.

== Family ==
His father's name is Sukhdev Singh.

== Political career ==
Sikki was elected to the Punjab Legislative Assembly from the Khadoor Sahib constituency in 2012. He was the second-wealthiest candidate in the 2012 Punjab elections.

On 14 April 2017, Sikki uploaded a video allegedly threatening the local police to submit to the demands of his supporters or face consequences.
