= Shiromani Akali Dal (Amritsar) =

- Abbreviation: SAD(A)
- President: Simranjit Singh Mann
- Founded: 1 May 1994; 32 years ago
- Split from: Shiromani Akali Dal
- Preceded by: United Akali Dal
- Headquarters: Quilla S. Harnam Singh, Fatehgarh Sahib district, Punjab, India
- Student wing: Sikh Students Federation
- Youth wing: Youth Akali Dal Amritsar
- Ideology: Hard-line Sikh nationalism Sikh minority rights
- Political position: Far-right
- Colours: Yellow Blue
- ECI status: Registered
- Seats in Rajya Sabha: 0 / 245
- Seats in Lok Sabha: 0 / 543
- Seats in Punjab Legislative Assembly: 0 / 117

Election symbol
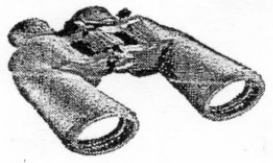

Party flag
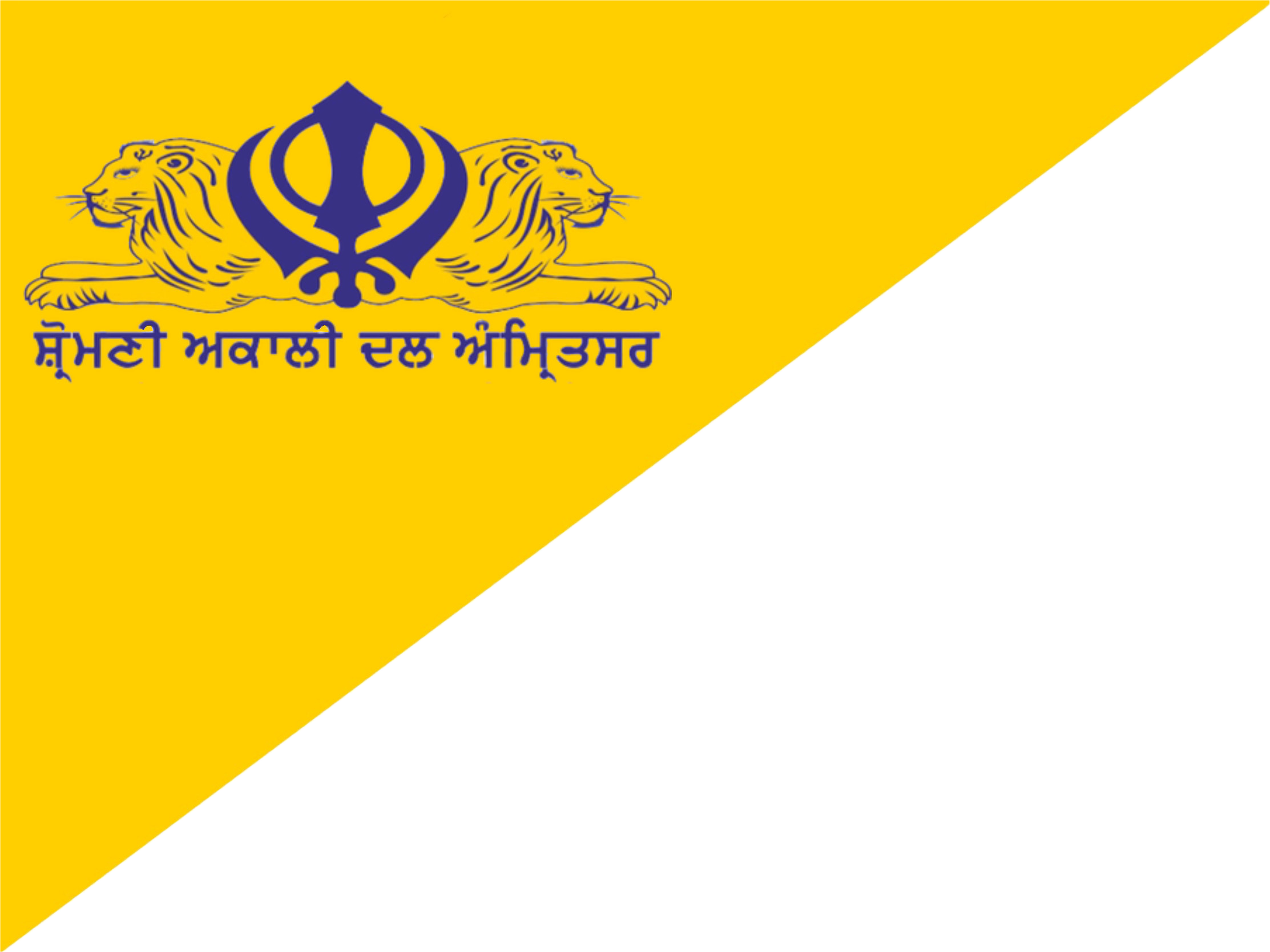

Website
- akalidalamritsar.in

Shiromani Akali Dal (Amritsar) is a hard-line Sikh nationalist political party led by Simranjit Singh Mann, it is a splinter group of the Shiromani Akali Dal in Punjab, India. They use 'Balti', the Punjabi term for bucket as their official election symbol. Shiromani Akali Dal (Amritsar) was formed on 1 May 1994. The party has seen a resurgence in support after the death of Deep Sidhu who was a supporter and seen as sympathetic to the cause of Simranjit Singh Mann. Their 2022 Lok Sabha victory after more than two decades was viewed as a resurgence in a political vacuum due to collapse of other traditional political parties in Punjab. However, it failed to retain the seat in 2024. The last major victory for Shiromani Akali Dal (Amritsar) was in the 1989 Lok Sabha elections, where the party and their allies won 10 out of 13 seats from Punjab.

== Electoral success ==
The party's most significant success was in the 1989 Indian general elections when they won six out of the 13 seats in Punjab. The party espouses the ideology of Punjabiyat and Sikh nationalism. Moreover, the party won the parliamentary seat of Sangrur in 1999 and 2022 (by-elections). Also, Mann emphasized his priority will be to "work with the Punjab government" to "raise the poor economic condition of Sangrur including the condition of farmers under debt". The party contested the SGPC elections on the same plank and won three seats.

The only time an MLA belonging to SAD (A) was ever elected to the Punjab Legislative Assembly was in the election of 1997 when Sardar Ajit Inder Singh won from the constituency of Sardulgarh by defeating the Shiromani Akali Dal candidate by 3,117 votes.

== History and ideology ==
Akali politics in post-colonial India have organized around advancing and protecting Sikh political and cultural interests and Punjabi language. By 1973, the Akali's adopted the Anandpur Sahib Resolution a document which advanced a desire for increasing regional autonomy within India's centralized structure of governance, as well as various socio political conerens.

From 1975 to 1977, the then Prime Minister of India, Indira Gandhi would institute a state of emergency suspending elections and civil liberties. During the early phases of the emergency, Akali and Sikh parties would meet in Amritsar to resist the "fascist tendency of the Congress". The Akali Dal would launch the "Campaign to Save Democracy". However, the period would see widespread human rights abuses including the mass detention of dissidents and opposition; forced sterilizations; constitutional modifications; demolition of homes and displacement of people and suspension of the press.

Following the end of the emergency from 1977 to 1984, the Akali Dal would be re-elected in Punjab and constitute the main opposition to the Indira Gandhi-led Congress government. The period would see an increase in Punjabi nationalism. The party would continue to organize around the adoption of the Anandpur Sahib Resolution. The central government would treat the Anandpur Sahib Resolution as a secessionist document, eventually culminating in Operation Blue Star, an invasion of Golden Temple on 1 June 1984. The operation would result in mass civilian casualties and precipitate an insurgency in Punjab for the formation of Khalistan. The Khalistan movement would be brutally suppressed by the central Indian state leading to mass human rights violations including extrajudicial executions, torture, and mass detention.

On 1 May 1994, the Shiromani Akali Dal (Amritsar) split from the traditional Shiromani Akali Dal. While there are overlaps in ideology between the two parties, the Shiromani Akali Dal (Amritsar) remains more radical than its predecessor. The party also acts as a successor to the first United Akali Dal, of which Simranjit Singh Mann remained a prominent leader. The party continues to advocate for increasing the autonomy of the state of Punjab. Moreover, the party continues to advocate for the Anandpur Sahib Resolution which proposed several religious, economic and political aims for the state of Punjab. In 2003, the party sided with the Dalit activists protesting against a social-boycott launched by Jatts against them in Talhan village. The party opposes the Sutlej Yamuna Link canal noting the canal violates the state's riparian water rights and will accelerate ongoing desertification. The party has also been critical of extrajudicial killings, torture and genocide of Sikhs by governmental authorities in the 1980-90s. Upon winning the seat in 2022, Simranjit Singh Mann gave credit to Jarnail Singh Bhindranwale.

The Mann family can be paired with the Shiromani Akali Dal's Badal and Majithia families through their association with dynastic politics. Large leaders in the Panthic political sphere are generally sidelined like Daljit Singh Bittu, Sarabjeet Singh Khalsa, Amritpal Singh Mehron and others. When there was an inter-party debate on who would be the next leader of the party, Simranjit Singh Mann chose his son Emaan Singh Mann over long-time party worker Jaskaran Singh Kahan Singh Wala who was made to leave soon afterwards.

From 2023 onwards, there has been a drift from moderate, traditional Sikh and Panthic politics dominated by the Shiromani Akali Dal and Shiromani Akali Dal (Amritsar) respectively towards reformists and "Neo-panthics" dominated by the Akali Dal (Waris Punjab De) led by Amritpal Singh and the ideologically weakest, Shiromani Akali Dal (Punar Surjit) faction. Recently, many from the Shiromani Akali Dal (Punar Surjit) faction have defected to Amritpal Singh's party, and there has been speculation that the Shiromani Akali Dal (Amritsar) would merge with Akali Dal (Waris Punjab De) on the condition that Emaan Singh Mann becomes the party President (even in the Indian General election, Mann had endorsed Amritpal Singh, withdrawing their own candidate).

=== Office holders ===
President Shiromani Akali Dal (Amritsar)
S.No.	Portrait	Name (born /death)	Party Officer (Presidents)	Term in office		
S.No.	Portrait	Name (born /death)	Party Officer (Presidents)	Assumed office	Left office	Time in office
1		Simranjit Singh Mann born 20 May 1945	President Shiromani Akali Dal (Amritsar)	1 May 1994	Incumbent	32 years, 165 days

=== Anandpur Sahib Resolution ===
In short, the Anandpur Sahib Resolution aimed to: reiterate the separateness of the Sikh tradition from Hinduism; increase the devolution of power from the central government to the states, to provide states with more autonomy; eradicate poverty and starvation through increased production and a more equitable distribution of wealth and also the establishment of a just social order sans exploitation of any kind; remove discrimination on the basis of caste, creed or any other ground; and combat disease and ill health by reducing the use of intoxicants and provision of full facilities for the growth of physical well-being.

== Punjab Electoral performance ==
=== Lok Sabha ===
The Lok Sabha, also known as the House of the People, is the lower house of the bicameral Parliament of India, where the upper house is Rajya Sabha. Members of the Lok Sabha are elected by an adult universal suffrage and a first-past-the-post system to represent their respective constituencies, and they hold their seats for five years or until the body is dissolved by the president of India on the advice of the union council of ministers. The house meets in the Lok Sabha chamber of the Parliament House in New Delhi.

Members of the Lok Sabha
Election Year	Leader	seats contested	seats won	+/- in seats	Overall votes	votes %	+/- in vote share	Sitting side
1989	Simranjit Singh Mann	13	6 / 13	New entry	2,318,872	0.77%	New entry	Others
1991	Simranjit Singh Mann	Boycotted the elections						
1996	Simranjit Singh Mann	6	0 / 13	Steady	339,520	0.10%	Steady	Others
1998	Simranjit Singh Mann	3	0 / 13	Steady	248,529	0.07%	Steady	Others
1999	Simranjit Singh Mann	3	1 / 13	▲1	298,846	3.4%	▲1.4%	Others
2004	Simranjit Singh Mann	6	0 / 13	▼	3,87,682	3.79%	▲0.38%	Others
2009	Simranjit Singh Mann		0 / 13	Steady	43,137	0.01%		Others
2014	Simranjit Singh Mann	3	0 / 13	Steady	35,516	0.01%	Steady	Others
2019	Simranjit Singh Mann	2	0 / 13	Steady	52,185	0.38%	Steady	Others
2022-23 By-election	Simranjit Singh Mann	2	1 / 2	▲1	2,73,520	35.61%	▲35.1%	Others
2024	Simranjit Singh Mann	12	0 / 13	Steady	517,024	3.84%	▲3.44%	Others

== List of Members of the Lok Sabha ==
Sr. No.	Portrait	Member of Parliament	Elecation Year	Constituency	Winner Margin	Term in office		
Sr. No.	Portrait	Member of Parliament	Elecation Year	Constituency	Winner Margin	Assumed office	Left office	Time in office
1		Simranjit Singh Mann born 20 May 1945	2022-23 By-election	Sangrur	6,245✓	26 June 2022	4 June 2024	1 year, 344 days
1		Simranjit Singh Mann born 20 May 1945	1999	Sangrur	86,317✓	6 October 1999	13 May 2004	4 years, 220 days
1		Simranjit Singh Mann born 20 May 1945	1989	Tarn Taran	4,80,417✓	2 December 1989	13 March 1991	1 year, 101 days
2		Rajinder Kaur Bulara born 10 June 1946	1989	Ludhiana	1,33,729✓	2 December 1989	13 March 1991	1 year, 101 days
3		Jagdev Singh Khudian (born 1937– death 1989)	1989	Faridkot	157,383✓	2 December 1989	28 December 1989	26 days
4		Baba Sucha Singh (died 26 January 2007)	1989	Bathinda	113,490✓	2 December 1989	13 March 1991	1 year, 101 days
5		Dhian Singh Mand (born 3 May 1961)	1989	Firozpur	200,000✓	2 December 1989	13 March 1991	1 year, 101 days
6		Bimal Kaur Khalsa (born 7 November 1950 – death 2 September 1991)	1989	Ropar	2,30,576✓	2 December 1989	13 March 1991	1 year, 101 days

=== Punjab Legislative Assembly Elections ===
The Punjab Legislative Assembly or the Punjab Vidhan Sabha is the unicameral legislature of the state of Punjab in India. The Sixteenth Punjab Legislative Assembly was constituted in March 2022. At present, it consists of 117 members, directly elected from 117 single-seat constituencies. The tenure of the Legislative Assembly is five years unless dissolved sooner. The Speaker of the sixteenth assembly is Kultar Singh Sandhwan. The meeting place of the Legislative Assembly since 6 March 1961 is the Vidhan Bhavan in Chandigarh.

Punjab Legislative Assembly elections
Election Year	Leader	seats contested	seats won	+/- in seats	Overall votes	% of overall votes	+/- in vote share	Sitting side
1997	Simranjit Singh Mann	30	1 / 117	▲1	3,19,111	3.10%	▲3.10%	Others
2002	Simranjit Singh Mann	84	0 / 117	▼1	4,78,115	4.60%	▲1.50	Others
2007	Simranjit Singh Mann	37	0 / 117	-	4,68,901	4.50%	▼0.10	Others
2012	Simranjit Singh Mann	57	0 / 117	-	1,82,861	2.73%	▼1.36	Others
2017	Simranjit Singh Mann	54	0 / 117	-	49,260	0.3%	▼1.06	Others
2022	Simranjit Singh Mann	81	0 / 117	-	386,176	2.48%	▲2.18	Others

== List of Punjab Assembly election, 1997 ==
Sr. No.	Portrait	Member of Legislative Assembly	Constituency	Term in office			
Sr. No.	Portrait	Member of Legislative Assembly	Constituency	Winner Margin	Assumed office	Left office	Time in office
1		Ajit Inder Singh; 20 May 1945	Sardulgarh	3,117✓	12 February 1997	13 February 2002	5 years, 1 day

== See also ==
- List of political parties in India
