= Gurdaspur Lok Sabha constituency =

Lok Sabha Constituency in Punjab

Coordinates: 32.0°N 75.4°E

Gurdaspur PB-1
- Lok Sabha constituency
- Interactive Map Outlining Gurdaspur Lok Sabha constituency

Constituency details
- Country: India
- State: Punjab
- Assembly constituencies: Sujanpur; Bhoa; Pathankot; Gurdaspur; Dina Nagar; Qadian; Batala; Fatehgarh Churian; Dera Baba Nanak
- Established: 1952
- Total electors: 16,05,204(2024)
- Reservation: None

Member of Parliament
- 18th Lok Sabha
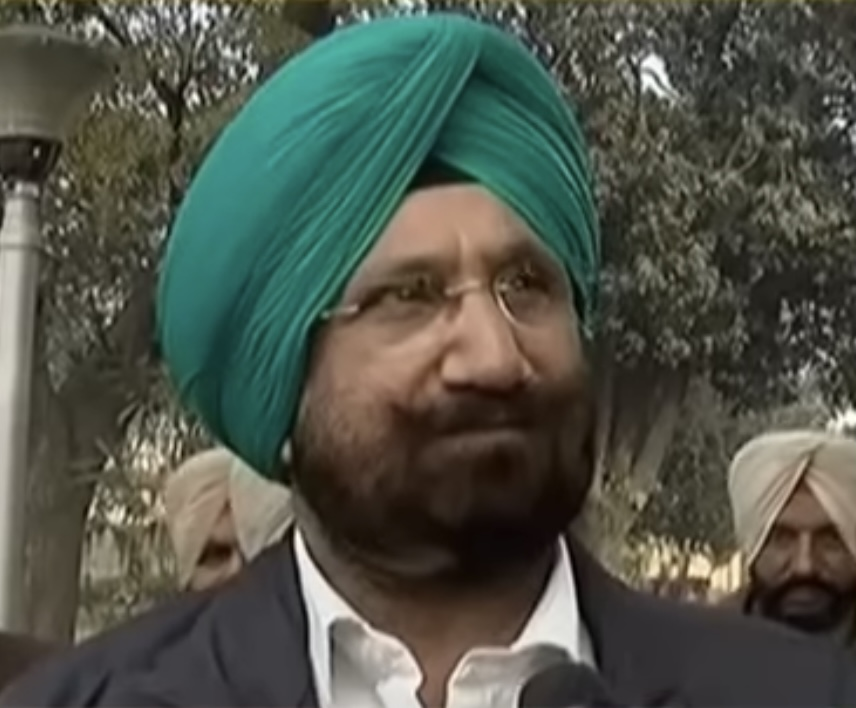
- Incumbent Sukhjinder Singh Randhawa
- Party: INC
- Alliance: INDIA
- Elected year: 2024

Gurdaspur Lok Sabha constituency is one of the 13 Lok Sabha (parliamentary) constituencies in Punjab state in northern India. The incumbent MP is Sukhjinder Singh Randhawa from Indian National Congress.

== Assembly segments ==
Presently, Gurdaspur Lok Sabha constituency consist of nine assembly constituencies

| # | Constituency | District | Member | Party | 2024 Lead |
|---|---|---|---|---|---|
| 1 | Sujanpur | Pathankot | Naresh Puri | INC | BJP |
| 2 | Bhoa (SC) | Pathankot | Lal Chand Kataruchakk | AAP | BJP |
| 3 | Pathankot | Pathankot | Ashwani Kumar Sharma | BJP | BJP |
| 4 | Gurdaspur | Gurdaspur | Barindermeet Singh Pahra | INC | INC |
| 5 | Dina Nagar (SC) | Gurdaspur | Aruna Chaudhary | INC | INC |
| 6 | Qadian | Gurdaspur | Partap Singh Bajwa | INC | INC |
| 7 | Batala | Gurdaspur | Amansher Singh | AAP | INC |
| 9 | Fatehgarh Churian | Gurdaspur | Tripat Rajinder Singh Bajwa | INC | INC |
| 10 | Dera Baba Nanak | Gurdaspur | Gurdeep Singh Randhawa | AAP | INC |

== Members of Parliament ==
Most Successful parties from Gurdaspur Lok Sabha
1. INC (13 Times) (65.0%)
2. BJP (5 Times) (25.0%)
3. Janata Party (1 Time) (5.00%)
4. INC (I) (1 Time) (5.00%)

| Year | Member | Party |
|---|---|---|
| 1952 | Teja Singh Akarpuri | Indian National Congress |
| 1957 | Diwan Chand Sharma | Indian National Congress |
| 1962 | Diwan Chand Sharma | Indian National Congress |
| 1967 | Diwan Chand Sharma | Indian National Congress |
| 1968^ | Prabodh Chandra | Indian National Congress |
| 1971 | Prabodh Chandra | Indian National Congress |
| 1977 | Yagya Dutt Sharma | Janata Party |
| 1980 | Sukhbuns Kaur | Indian National Congress (I) |
| 1984 | Sukhbuns Kaur | Indian National Congress |
| 1989 | Sukhbuns Kaur | Indian National Congress |
| 1991 | Sukhbuns Kaur | Indian National Congress |
| 1996 | Sukhbuns Kaur | Indian National Congress |
| 1998 | Vinod Khanna | Bharatiya Janata Party |
| 1999 | Vinod Khanna | Bharatiya Janata Party |
| 2004 | Vinod Khanna | Bharatiya Janata Party |
| 2009 | Partap Singh Bajwa | Indian National Congress |
| 2014 | Vinod Khanna | Bharatiya Janata Party |
| 2017^ | Sunil Jakhar | Indian National Congress |
| 2019 | Sunny Deol | Bharatiya Janata Party |
| 2024 | Sukhjinder Singh Randhawa | Indian National Congress |

^By-Poll

== Election results ==
=== 2024 ===
2024 Indian general election: Gurdaspur
| Party | Candidate | Votes | % | ±% |
|---|---|---|---|---|
| INC | Sukhjinder Singh Randhawa | 364,043 | 33.78 | ▼9.36 |
| BJP | Dinesh Singh | 281,182 | 26.09 | ▼24.52 |
| AAP | Amansher Singh | 277,252 | 25.72 | ▲23.21 |
| SAD | Daljit Singh Cheema | 85,500 | 7.93 | New |
| SAD(A) | Gurinder Singh Bajwa | 25,765 | 2.39 | New |
| NOTA | None of the Above | 3,354 | 0.31 | ▼0.56 |
| Majority | | 82,861 | 7.69 | ▼0.22 |
| Turnout | | 1,077,826 | | |
| Registered electors | | 16,05,204 | | |
| INC gain from BJP | | Swing | | |

=== 2019 ===
2019 Indian general election: Gurdaspur
| Party | Candidate | Votes | % | ±% |
|---|---|---|---|---|
| BJP | Sunny Deol | 558,719 | 50.61 | ▲14.94 |
| INC | Sunil Kumar Jakhar | 476,260 | 43.14 | ▼15.01 |
| AAP | Peter Masih | 27,744 | 2.51 | ▼0.23 |
| RMPI | Lal Chand Kataruchakk | 15,274 | 1.38 | New |
| IND | Kasim Deen | 3,136 | 0.28 | New |
| NOTA | None of the Above | 9,560 | 0.87 | ▼0.01 |
| Majority | | 82,459 | 7.47 | ▼15.01 |
| Turnout | | 1,104,546 | 69.26 | ▲12.76 |
| BJP gain from INC | | Swing | ▼7.54 | |

=== 2017 by-election ===
Bye-election, 2017: Gurdaspur
| Party | Candidate | Votes | % | ±% |
|---|---|---|---|---|
| INC | Sunil Kumar Jakhar | 499,752 | 58.15 | ▲24.95 |
| BJP | Swaran Salaria | 306,533 | 35.67 | ▼10.58 |
| AAP | Suresh Kumar Khajuria | 23,579 | 2.74 | ▼13.89 |
| IND | Parvinder Singh | 6,825 | 0.79 | New |
| IND | Pawan Kumar | 3,791 | 0.44 | New |
| NOTA | None of the Above | 7,587 | 0.88 | ▲0.44 |
| Majority | | 193,219 | 22.48 | ▲9.43 |
| Turnout | | 859,467 | 56.43 | ▼13.07 |
| INC gain from BJP | | Swing | ▲11.90 | |

=== 2014 ===
2014 Indian general elections: Gurdaspur
| Party | Candidate | Votes | % | ±% |
|---|---|---|---|---|
| BJP | Vinod Khanna | 482,255 | 46.25 | ▼0.85 |
| INC | Partap Singh Bajwa | 346,190 | 33.20 | ▼14.80 |
| AAP | Sucha Singh Chhotepur | 173,376 | 16.63 | New |
| CPI | Varinder Singh | 11,839 | 1.14 | New |
| BSP | Sukhwinder Singh | 5,621 | 0.54 | ▼1.11 |
| NOTA | None of the Above | 4,625 | 0.44 | N/A |
| Majority | | 136,065 | 13.05 | ▲12.15 |
| Turnout | | 1,042,699 | 69.50 | ▼1.27 |
| BJP gain from INC | | Swing | ▼1.75 | |

=== 2009 ===
2009 Indian general elections: Gurdaspur
| Party | Candidate | Votes | % | ±% |
|---|---|---|---|---|
| INC | Partap Singh Bajwa | 447,994 | 48.00 | |
| BJP | Vinod Khanna | 4,39,652 | 47.10 | |
| BSP | Swaran Singh Thakur | 15,420 | 1.65 | |
| IND. | Lal Chand | 7,037 | 0.75 | |
| IND. | Vidya Bhushan | 6,970 | 0.75 | |
| Majority | | 8,342 | 0.90 | |
| Turnout | | 9,33,370 | 70.77 | |
| INC gain from BJP | | Swing | | |

== See also ==
- Gurdaspur district
- List of constituencies of the Lok Sabha
