= 2007 Punjab Legislative Assembly election =

2007 Punjab legislative assembly election
- 30 January 2007

116 (of the 117) seats to the Punjab Legislative Assembly 59 seats needed for a majority
- Turnout: 75.42% (▲13.28pp)
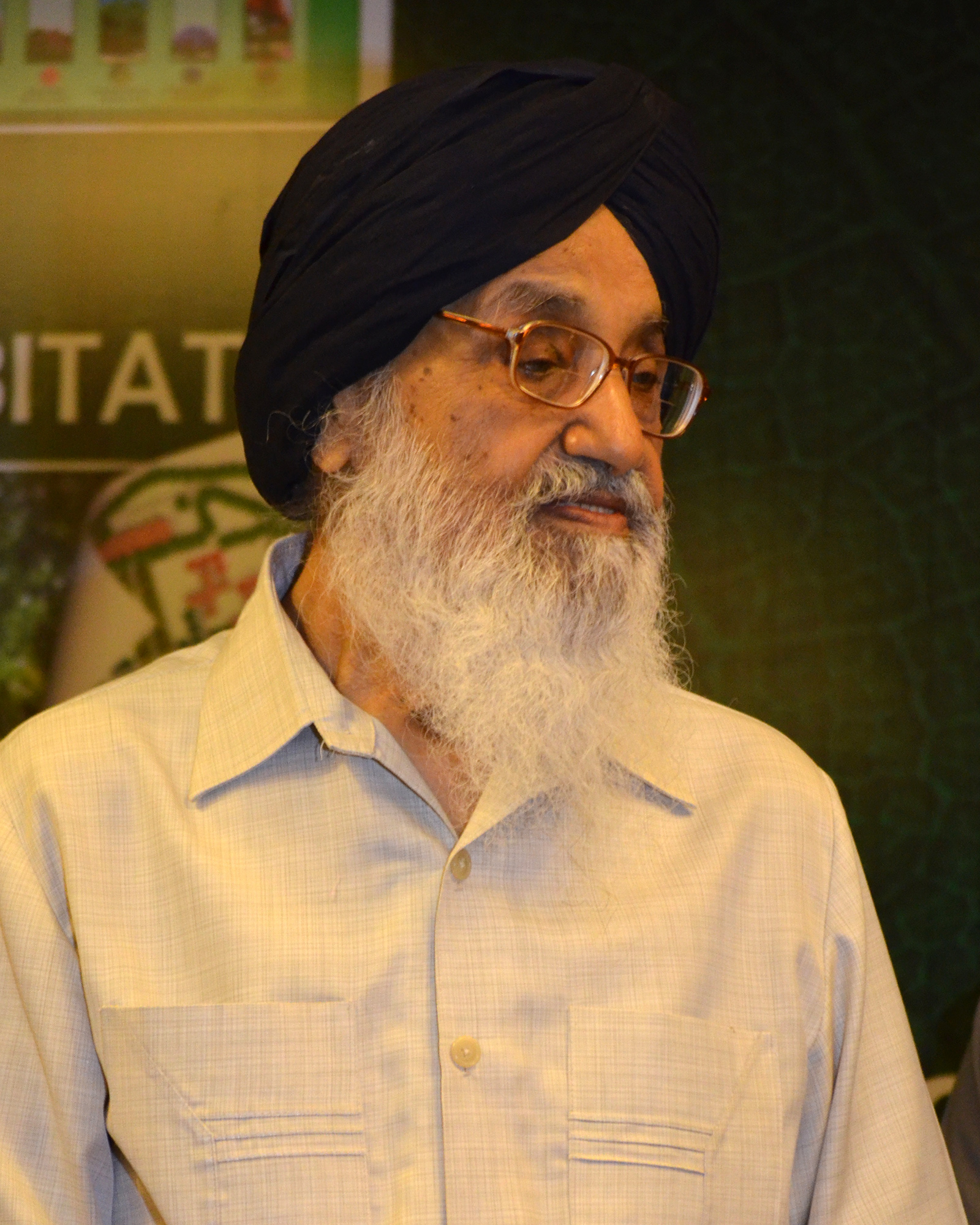

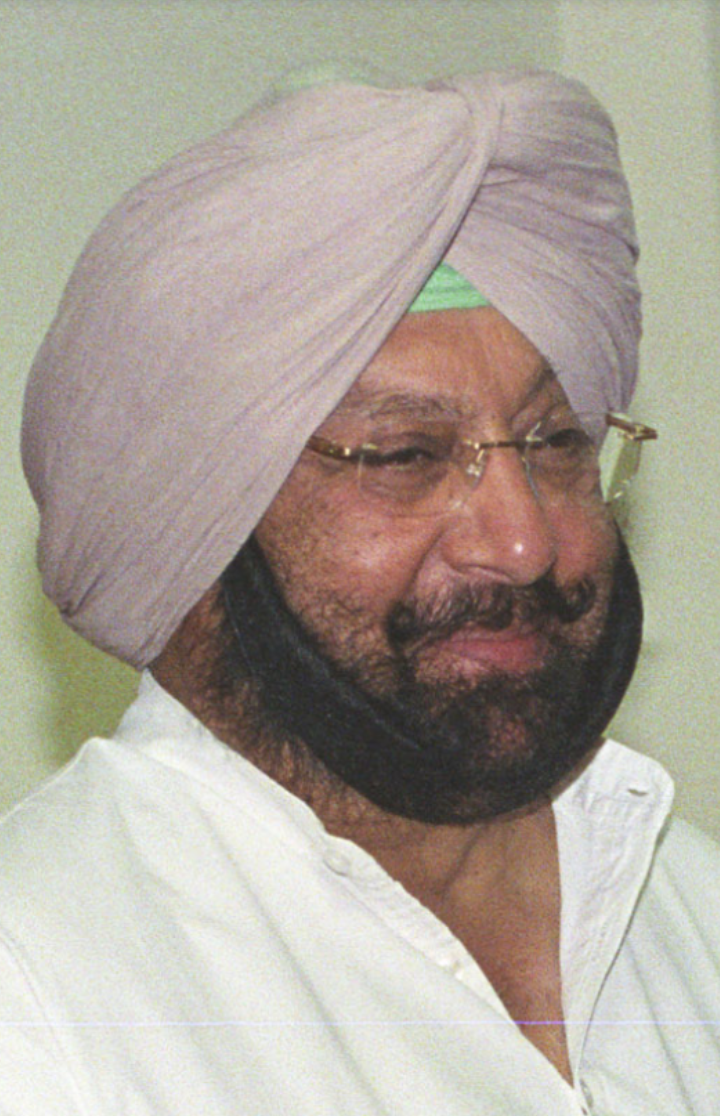

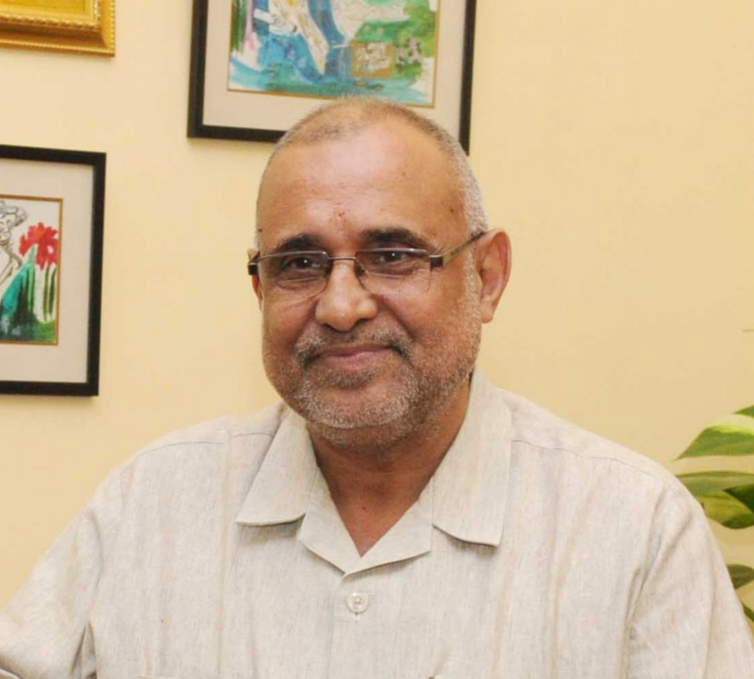
	First party	Second party	Third party
Leader	Parkash Singh Badal	Captain Amarinder Singh	Avinash Rai Khanna
Party	SAD	INC	BJP
Alliance	NDA	UPA	NDA
Leader since	1 March 1997	26 February 2002	27 September 2003
Leader's seat	Lambi	Patiala	Did not contest
Last election	41	62	3
Seats won	48	44	19
Seat change	▲7	▼18	▲16
Popular vote	4,689,018	5,170,548	1,046,451
Percentage	37.09%	40.90%	8.28%
Swing	▲6.01pp	▲0.79pp	▲2.61pp
Chief Minister before election
Amarinder Singh
INC
Elected Chief Minister
Parkash Singh Badal
SAD

The Punjab Legislative Assembly election, 2007 was held in Indian state of Punjab in 2007, to elect 117 members to the 13th Punjab Legislative Assembly. Shiromani Akali Dal, and its alliance partner Bharatiya Janata Party gained majority of the seats. Parkash Singh Badal was elected as the Chief Minister

== Background ==
2007 general elections in Punjab witnessed most closely fought elections in Indian National Congress and Shiromani Akali Dal. The turnout among 1.69 Crore eligible voters, which is 76% was exceptionally high compared to last elections.

The 2007 Punjab Assembly Elections at a Glance

The 2007 Punjab Assembly Elections at a Glance
S. No.	(Contest/won)		(Contest/won)		(Contest/won)	
S. No.	1997 Vote		2002 Vote		2007 Vote	
INC	105/14	26.59	105/62	35.81	116/44	40.9
SAD	92/75	37.64	92/41	31.08	93/49	37.09
BJP	22/18	8.33	23/3	5.67	23/19	8.28
CPI	15/2	2.98	11/2	2.15	25/0	0.76
CPM	25/0	1.79	13/0	0.36	14/0	0.28
SAD (M)	30/1	3.10	84/0	4.65	37/0	0.52

== Parties and Alliances ==
National Democratic Alliance

No.	Party	Flag	Symbol	Photo	Leader	Seats contested	Seats Won
1.	Shiromani Akali Dal (Badal)				Parkash Singh Badal	94	48
2.	Bharatiya Janata Party					23	19

=== United Progressive Alliance ===
No.	Party	Flag	Symbol	Photo	Leader	Seats contested	Seats Won
1.	Indian National Congress		Hand		Captain Amarinder Singh	117	44

Bahujan Samaj Party

No.	Party	Flag	Symbol	Photo	Leader	Seats contested
3.	Bahujan Samaj Party					115

=== Others ===
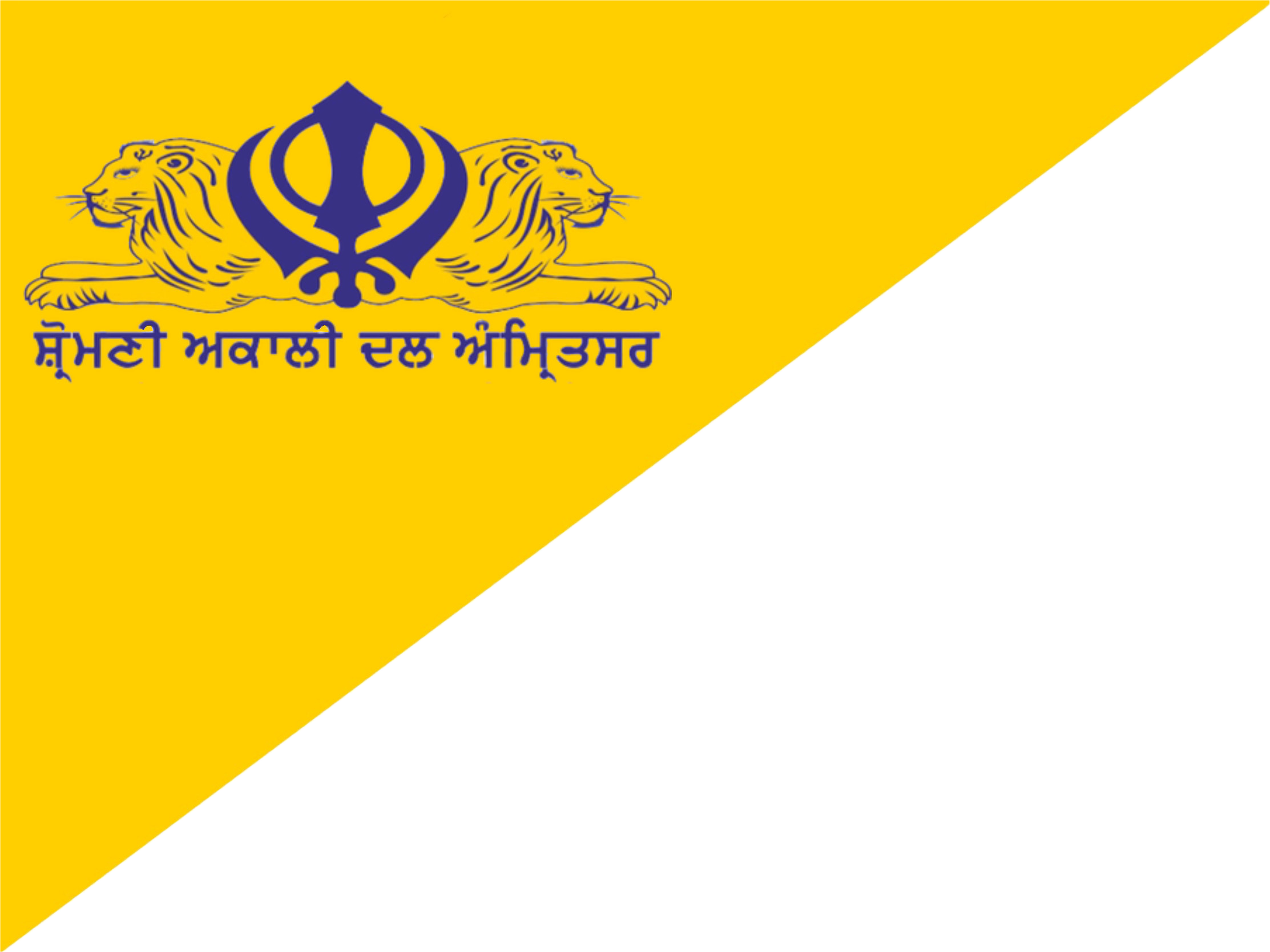
No.	Party	Flag	Symbol	Photo	Leader	Seats contested
1.	Shiromani Akali Dal (Amritsar)					37
2.	Communist Party of India (Marxist)					14
3.	Communist Party of India					25
4	Nationalist Congress Party					15
5.	Communist Party of India (M–L) Liberation					10
6.	All India Forward Bloc					2
7	Janata Dal (Secular)					1
8	Jammu and Kashmir National Panthers Party					3
9	Lok Janshakti Party					37
10	Rashtriya Janata Dal					2
11	Rashtriya Samata Party					7
12	Shiv Sena					8
13	Samajwadi Party					6

== Results ==
Summary of results of the Punjab Legislative Assembly election, 2007
Party	Candidates	Seats won	Votes	% of votes
Shiromani Akali Dal	93	48	4,689,018	37.09%
Indian National Congress	116	44	5,170,548	40.90%
Bharatiya Janata Party	23	19	1,046,451	8.28%
Independent	431	5	861,595	6.82%
Total (Note: The total includes votes and contestants of all parties, even those who failed to win any seat.)	1043	116	12,641,706	

== Results by Region ==
Region	Seats				
Region	Seats	INC	SAD	BJP	OTH
Malwa	65	37	19	5	4
Majha	27	3	17	7	0
Doaba	25	4	13	7	1
Total	117	44	49	19	5

== Result by Constituency ==
Constituency		Winner				Runner Up				Margin	%
#	Name	Candidate	Party	Votes	%	Candidate	Party	Votes	%	Margin	%
1	Fatehgarh	Nirmal Singh Kahlon	SAD	49,909	51.27	Sukhjinder Singh Randhawa	INC	44,080	45.28	5,829	5.99
2	Batala	Jagdish Sahni	BJP	47,929	46.82	Ashwani Sekhri	INC	47,849	46.74	80	0.08
3	Qadian	Lakhbir Singh Lodhinangal	SAD	52,561	48.40	Tripat Rajinder Singh Bajwa	INC	50,805	46.79	1,756	1.61
4	Sri Hargobindpur	Capt. Balbir Singh Bath	SAD	42,563	48.82	Fateh Jang Singh Bajwa	INC	39,274	45.05	3,289	3.77
5	Kahnuwan	Partap Singh Bajwa	INC	50,253	51.31	Sewa Singh Sekhwan	SAD	45,537	46.49	4,716	4.82
6	Dhariwal	Sucha Singh Langah	SAD	52,080	54.88	Sucha Singh Chhotepur	IND	38,131	40.18	13,949	14.70
7	Gurdaspur	Gurbachan Singh Babbehali	SAD	51,407	49.65	Pritam Singh Bhinder	INC	47,081	45.47	4,326	4.18
8	Dina Nagar (SC)	Sita Ram	BJP	49,161	48.14	Aruna Chaudhary	INC	48,321	47.32	840	0.82
9	Narot Mehra (SC)	Bishamber Dass	BJP	40,791	47.85	Rumal Chand	INC	25,426	29.83	15,365	18.02
10	Pathankot	Master Mohan Lal	BJP	43,705	42.28	Ashok Sharma	INC	35,175	34.03	8,530	8.25
11	Sujanpur	Dinesh Singh	BJP	51,913	46.57	Raghunath Sahai Puri	INC	51,609	46.30	304	0.27
13	Majitha	Bikram Singh Majithia	SAD	51,690	55.31	Sukhjinder Raj Singh	INC	28,682	30.69	23,008	24.62
14	Verka (SC)	Dalbir Singh Verka	SAD	67,697	53.05	Raj Kumar Verka	INC	49,594	38.86	18,103	14.19
15	Jandiala (SC)	Malkiat Singh	SAD	63,123	53.43	Sardul Singh	INC	48,832	41.34	14,291	12.09
16	Amritsar North	Anil Joshi	BJP	33,397	46.63	Jugal Kishore Sharma	INC	19,302	26.95	14,095	19.68
17	Amritsar West	Om Parkash Soni	INC	60,969	47.09	Rajinder Mohan Singh	BJP	48,871	37.74	12,098	9.35
18	Amritsar Central	Lakshmi Kanta Chawla	BJP	18,866	41.20	Darbari Lal	INC	15,171	33.13	3,695	8.07
19	Amritsar South	Raminder Singh Bolaria	SAD	54,632	62.51	Harjinder Singh Thekedar	INC	30,624	35.04	24,008	27.47
20	Ajnala	Amarpal Singh Ajnala	SAD	56,559	50.13	Harpartap Singh Ajnala	INC	46,359	41.09	10,200	9.04
21	Raja Sansi	Sukhbinder Singh Sarkaria	INC	51,698	50.93	Vir Singh Lopoke	SAD	43,422	42.78	8,276	8.15
22	Attari (SC)	Gulzar Singh Ranike	SAD	43,235	58.67	Rattan Singh	INC	24,163	32.79	19,072	25.88
23	Tarn Taran	Harmeet Singh	SAD	44,841	48.73	Manjit Singh	INC	28,307	30.76	16,534	17.97
24	Khadoor Sahib (SC)	Manjit Singh Mianwind	SAD	43,470	51.60	Tarsem Singh	INC	33,490	39.76	9,980	11.84
25	Naushahra Panwan	Ranjit Singh Brahampura	SAD	39,846	49.24	Dharambir Agnihotri	INC	37,387	46.19	2,459	3.05
26	Patti	Adesh Partap Singh	SAD	55,485	52.76	Harminder Singh Gill	INC	45,538	43.30	9,947	9.46
27	Valtoha	Virsa Singh	SAD	52,085	52.81	Gurchet Singh	INC	40,735	41.30	11,350	11.51
28	Adampur	Sarbjeet Singh Makkar	SAD	44,883	47.21	Kanwaljit Singh Lally	INC	34,643	36.44	10,240	10.77
29	Jullundur Cantonment	Jagbir Singh Brar	SAD	50,436	53.28	Gurkanwal Kaur	INC	33,452	35.34	16,984	17.94
30	Jullundur North	K.D. Bhandari	BJP	45,579	50.31	Avtar Henry	INC	40,650	44.87	4,929	5.44
31	Jullundur Central	Manoranjan Kalia	BJP	47,221	52.61	Tajinder Singh Bittu	INC	28,212	31.43	19,009	21.18
32	Jullundur South (SC)	Chuni Lal Bhagat	BJP	56,775	50.00	Mohinder Singh K.P.	INC	44,860	39.51	11,915	10.49
33	Kartarpur (SC)	Avinash Chander	SAD	54,380	51.77	Ch. Jagjit Singh	INC	43,311	41.23	11,069	10.54
34	Lohian	Ajit Singh Kohar	SAD	59,642	55.13	C. D. Singh Kamboj	INC	40,381	37.32	19,261	17.81
35	Nakodar	Amarjit Singh Samra	INC	44,255	45.14	Kuldip Singh Wadala	SAD	41,037	41.85	3,218	3.29
36	Nur Mahal	Gurdip Singh Bhullar	SAD	41,734	41.54	Gurbinder Singh Atwal	INC	36,316	36.15	5,418	5.39
37	Banga (SC)	Mohan Lal	SAD	36,581	41.65	Tarlochan Singh	INC	33,856	38.55	2,725	3.10
38	Nawan Shahr	Jatinder Singh Kariha	SAD	46,172	42.12	Parkash Singh	INC	40,357	36.81	5,815	5.31
39	Phillaur (SC)	Sarwan Singh	SAD	42,412	41.61	Santokh Chaudhary	INC	42,139	41.34	273	0.27
40	Bholath	Sukhpal Singh	INC	48,072	53.59	Jagir Kaur	SAD	39,208	43.71	8,864	9.88
41	Kapurthala	Rana Rajbans Kaur	INC	47,173	50.58	Raghbir Singh	SAD	40,888	43.84	6,285	6.74
42	Sultanpur	Upinderjit Kaur	SAD	49,363	53.50	Navtej Singh	INC	38,318	41.53	11,045	11.97
43	Phagwara (SC)	Swarna Ram	BJP	47,906	46.86	Joginder Singh Mann	INC	38,302	37.46	9,604	9.40
44	Balachaur	Nand Lal	SAD	41,206	43.10	Santosh Kumari	INC	40,105	41.95	1,101	1.15
45	Garhshankar	Lov Kumar Goldy	INC	33,876	42.13	Mohinder Pal Mann	BJP	29,808	37.07	4,068	5.06
46	Mahilpur (SC)	Sohan Singh Thandal	SAD	31,099	44.17	Dr. Dilbag Rai	INC	19,266	27.36	11,833	16.81
47	Hoshiarpur	Tikshan Sud	BJP	41,309	44.52	Charanjit Singh Channi	INC	36,908	39.78	4,401	4.74
48	Sham Chaurasi (SC)	Mohinder Kaur	SAD	37,739	40.46	Ch. Ram Lubhaya	INC	34,922	37.44	2,817	3.02
49	Tanda	Sangat Singh Gilzian	IND	46,915	51.75	Balbir Singh Miani	SAD	34,109	37.62	12,806	14.13
50	Garhdiwala (SC)	Des Raj Dhugga	SAD	42,830	52.98	Jasbir Singh Pal	INC	22,446	27.77	20,384	25.21
51	Dasuya	Amarjit Singh Sahi	BJP	51,919	52.68	Ramesh Chander Dogra	INC	42,645	43.27	9,274	9.41
52	Mukerian	Arunesh Kumar	BJP	60,662	53.09	Rajnish Kumar	INC	45,984	40.24	14,678	12.85
53	Jagraon	Gurdeep Singh Bhaini	INC	46,084	42.23	Bhag Singh Mallah	SAD	45,211	41.43	873	0.80
54	Raikot	Harmohinder Singh	INC	49,629	48.60	Ranjit Singh	SAD	47,190	46.21	2,439	2.39
55	Dakha (SC)	Darshan Singh Shivalik	SAD	94,807	49.20	Malkiat Singh Dakha	INC	79,006	41.00	15,801	8.20
56	Qila Raipur	Jasbir Singh Khangura	INC	56,610	53.41	Jagdish Singh Garcha	SAD	45,734	43.15	10,876	10.26
57	Ludhiana North	Harish Bedi	BJP	31,218	36.30	Rakesh Pandey	INC	26,322	30.61	4,896	5.69
58	Ludhiana West	Harish Rai Dhanda	SAD	46,021	57.01	Harnam Das Johar	INC	31,617	39.17	14,404	17.84
59	Ludhiana East	Sat Pal Gosain	BJP	30,232	49.53	Surinder Kumar	INC	28,450	46.61	1,782	2.92
60	Ludhiana Rural	Hira Singh Gabria	SAD	1,35,633	51.76	Malkit Singh Birmi	INC	86,957	33.18	48,676	18.58
61	Payal	Tej Parkash Singh	INC	42,535	42.52	Maheshinder Singh Grewal	SAD	26,461	26.45	16,074	16.07
62	Kum Kalan (SC)	Ishar Singh	INC	55,082	48.73	Inder Iqbal Singh Atwal	SAD	53,017	46.91	2,065	1.82
63	Samrala	Jagjiwan Singh	SAD	53,135	54.56	Amrik Singh	INC	38,846	39.89	14,289	14.67
64	Khanna (SC)	Bikramjit Singh	SAD	54,395	47.46	Shamsher Singh Dullo	INC	52,795	46.07	1,600	1.39
65	Nangal	Kanwar Pal Singh	INC	42,474	46.60	Madan Mohan Mittal	BJP	39,798	43.66	2,676	2.94
66	Anandpur Sahib – Ropar	Sant Ajit Singh	SAD	47,810	47.13	Ramesh Dutt Sharma	INC	37,912	37.38	9,898	9.75
67	Chamkaur Sahib (SC)	Charanjit Singh Channi	IND	37,946	42.01	Satwant Kaur	SAD	36,188	40.06	1,758	1.95
68	Morinda	Ujaggar Singh	SAD	58,608	48.41	Jagmohan Singh	INC	50,188	41.46	8,420	6.95
69	Kharar	Balbir Singh	INC	85,092	50.02	Jasjit Singh	SAD	71,477	42.02	13,615	8.00
70	Banur	Kanwaljit Singh	SAD	79,324	59.46	Rakesh Sharma	INC	36,673	27.49	42,651	31.97
71	Rajpura	Raj Khurana	BJP	56,161	50.79	Hardial Singh Kamboj	INC	41,977	37.96	14,184	12.83
72	Ghanaur	Madan Lal Thekedar	IND	35,006	31.61	Ajaib Singh Mukhmailpura	SAD	34,274	30.95	732	0.66
73	Dakala	Lal Singh	INC	64,442	49.14	Harmail Singh Tohra	SAD	56,332	42.96	8,110	6.18
74	Shutrana (SC)	Nirmal Singh	INC	53,888	44.80	Hamir Singh Ghagga	SAD	51,293	42.65	2,595	2.15
75	Samana	Brahm Mahindra	INC	78,122	46.03	Surjeet Singh Rakhra	SAD	75,546	44.51	2,576	1.52
76	Patiala Town	Amarinder Singh	INC	60,346	65.69	Surjit Singh Kohli	SAD	27,596	30.04	32,750	35.65
77	Nabha	Randeep Singh	INC	41,310	32.40	Narinder Singh	SAD	35,997	28.24	5,313	4.16
78	Amloh (SC)	Sadhu Singh	INC	59,556	46.18	Satwinder Kaur	SAD	52,879	41.00	6,677	5.18
79	Sirhind	Didar Singh	SAD	58,578	51.00	Dr. Harbans Lal	INC	35,179	30.63	23,399	20.37
80	Dhuri	Iqbal Singh Jhundan	IND	36,469	31.87	Mai Roop Kaur	INC	33,290	29.09	3,179	2.78
81	Malerkotla	Razia Sultana	INC	72,184	51.86	Abdul Ghaffar	SAD	57,984	41.66	14,200	10.20
82	Sherpur (SC)	Harchand Kaur	INC	49,684	49.59	Gobind Singh	SAD	39,170	39.09	10,514	10.50
83	Barnala	Kewal Singh Dhillon	INC	58,723	47.78	Malkit Singh Keetu	SAD	57,359	46.67	1,364	1.11
84	Bhadaur (SC)	Balvir Singh Ghunas	SAD	38,069	37.69	Surinder Kaur Balian	INC	37,883	37.50	186	0.19
85	Dhanaula	Kuldip Singh Bhathal	INC	42,105	39.04	Gobind Singh Longowal	SAD	38,581	35.78	3,524	3.26
86	Sangrur	Surinder Pal Singh Sibia	INC	61,171	51.36	Prakash Chand Garg	SAD	49,161	41.28	12,010	10.08
87	Dirbha	Surjit Singh Dhiman	INC	54,036	47.81	Baldev Singh Mann	SAD	52,883	46.79	1,153	1.02
88	Sunam	Parminder Singh Dhindsa	SAD	52,270	43.92	Aman Arora	INC	42,138	35.41	10,132	8.51
89	Lehra	Rajinder Kaur	INC	47,515	40.48	Prem Chandumajra	SAD	47,267	40.27	248	0.21
90	Balluana (SC)	Gurtej Singh	SAD	50,929	47.78	Parkash Singh Bhatti	INC	36,295	34.05	14,634	13.73
91	Abohar	Sunil Kumar Jakhar	INC	70,679	54.60	Ram Kumar	BJP	53,478	41.31	17,201	13.29
92	Fazilka	Surjeet Kumar	BJP	58,284	52.13	Mohinder Kumar	INC	42,225	37.76	16,059	14.37
93	Jalalabad	Sher Singh	SAD	89,085	62.10	Hans Raj Josan	INC	45,008	31.38	44,077	30.72
94	Guru Har Sahai	Gurmeet Singh	INC	65,745	47.83	Paramjit Singh Sandhu	SAD	47,175	34.32	18,570	13.51
95	Firozepur	Sukhpal Singh	BJP	61,340	53.53	Bal Mukand Sharma	INC	46,461	40.55	14,879	12.98
96	Firozepur Cantonment	Janmeja Singh	SAD	54,980	52.02	Ravinder Singh	INC	46,475	43.97	8,505	8.05
97	Zira	Naresh Kumar	INC	64,903	53.27	Hari Singh Zira	SAD	52,531	43.12	12,372	10.15
98	Dharamkot (SC)	Seetal Singh	SAD	47,277	46.64	Kewal Singh	INC	41,577	41.01	5,700	5.63
99	Moga	Joginder Pal Jain	INC	55,300	47.77	Tota Singh	SAD	54,008	46.65	1,292	1.12
100	Bagha Purana	Darshan Singh Brar	INC	54,624	47.59	Sadhu Singh Rajiana	SAD	51,159	44.58	3,465	3.01
101	Nihal Singh Wala (SC)	Ajit Singh	IND	38,236	39.73	Jarnail Singh	SAD	36,604	38.03	1,632	1.70
102	Panjgrain (SC)	Joginder Singh	INC	46,032	42.92	Gurdev Singh Badal	SAD	42,543	39.67	3,489	3.25
103	Kot Kapura	Ripjit Singh	INC	68,970	50.22	Mantar Singh	SAD	58,160	42.35	10,810	7.87
104	Faridkot	Avtar Singh Brar	INC	65,152	45.33	Kushaldeep Singh	SAD	62,219	43.29	2,933	2.04
105	Muktsar	Kanwarjit Singh	INC	49,972	39.42	Sukhdarshan Singh Marar	SAD	37,549	29.62	12,423	9.80
106	Giddar Baha	Manpreet Singh Badal	SAD	53,111	43.18	Raghubir Singh	INC	34,283	27.87	18,828	15.31
107	Malout (SC)	Harpreet Singh	SAD	51,188	45.95	Nathu Ram	INC	43,962	39.47	7,226	6.48
108	Lambi	Parkash Singh Badal	SAD	56,282	51.35	Mahesh Inder Singh	INC	47,095	42.97	9,187	8.38
109	Talwandi Sabo	Jeetmohinder Singh Sidhu	INC	50,012	45.67	Amarjit Singh Sidhu	SAD	46,222	42.21	3,790	3.46
110	Pakka Kalan (SC)	Makhan Singh	INC	49,983	45.56	Darshan Singh Kotfatta	SAD	44,376	40.45	5,607	5.11
111	Bhatinda	Harminder Singh Jassi	INC	83,545	50.64	Sarup Chand Singla	SAD	68,900	41.77	14,645	8.87
112	Nathana (SC)	Ajaib Singh Bhatti	INC	58,857	50.03	Gura Singh Tungwali	SAD	52,207	44.38	6,650	5.65
113	Rampura Phul	Gurpreet Singh Kangar	INC	57,284	48.44	Sikander Singh Maluka	SAD	55,025	46.53	2,259	1.91
114	Joga	Jagdeep Singh Nakai	SAD	39,747	36.23	Sukhraj Singh Natt	IND	35,425	32.29	4,322	3.94
115	Mansa	Sher Singh	INC	53,515	43.68	Sukhwinder Singh	SAD	50,767	41.43	2,748	2.25
116	Budhlada	Mangat Rai Bansal	INC	56,271	49.01	Harbant Singh	SAD	43,456	37.85	12,815	11.16
117	Sardulgarh	Ajit Inder Singh	INC	58,940	49.60	Balwinder Singh Bhunder	SAD	54,388	45.77	4,552	3.83

== Government Formation ==
On March 2, 2007 Parkash Singh Badal took Oath for the record fourth time. With crowd gathered in the Mohali cricket stadium to attend the Oath Taking Ceremony.

== By-polls 2007-2011 ==
No.	Date	Constituency	MLA before election	Party before election	Elected MLA	Party after election
1.	3 August 2009	Kahnuwan	Partap Singh Bajwa	Indian National Congress	Sewa Singh Sekhwan	Shiromani Akali Dal
2.	2008	Amritsar South	Raminder Singh Bolaria	Shiromani Akali Dal	Inder Bir Singh Bolari	Shiromani Akali Dal
3.	12 June 2009	Nur Mahal	Gurdip Singh Bhullar	Shiromani Akali Dal	Rajwinder Kaur Bhullar	Shiromani Akali Dal
4.	3 August 2009	Banur	Kanwaljit Singh	Shiromani Akali Dal	Jasjit Singh Bunny	Shiromani Akali Dal
5.	3 August 2009	Jalalabad	Sher Singh Ghubaya	Shiromani Akali Dal	Sukhbir Singh Badal	Shiromani Akali Dal

== See also ==
- Elections in Punjab, India
