= Fatehgarh Churian Assembly constituency =

Legislative Assembly constituency in Punjab State, India

Coordinates: 31.87°N 74.96°E

Fatehgarh Churian
- Constituency No. 9 for the Punjab Legislative Assembly

Constituency details
- Country: India
- State: Punjab
- District: Gurdaspur
- Lok Sabha constituency: Gurdaspur
- Total electors: 175,730 (in 2022)
- Reservation: None

Member of Legislative Assembly
- 16th Punjab Legislative Assembly
- Incumbent Tripat Rajinder Singh Bajwa
- Party: Indian National Congress
- Elected year: 2022

Fatehgarh Churian Assembly constituency (Sl. No.: 9) is a Punjab Legislative Assembly constituency in Gurdaspur district, Punjab state, India.

== Members of the Legislative Assembly ==
Most successful parties from Fatehgarh Churian Vidhan Sabha
1. INC (9 Times) (56.2%)
2. SAD (5 Times) (31.2%)
3. AD - SFS (1 Time) (6.25%)
4. INC (I) (1 Time) (6.25%)

Year	Member	Party
1957	Joginder Singh	Indian National Congress
1962	Gurmej Singh	Shiromani Akali Dal
1967	N. Singh	Akali Dal – Sant Fateh Singh Group
1969	Santokh Singh	Indian National Congress
1972	Santokh Singh	Indian National Congress
1977	Dr. Jodh Singh	Shiromani Akali Dal
1980	Santokh	Indian National Congress (Indira)
1985	Nirmal Singh Kahlon	Shiromani Akali Dal
1992	Lakhmir Singh	Indian National Congress
1997	Nirmal Singh Kahlon	Shiromani Akali Dal
2002	Sukhjinder Singh Randhawa	Indian National Congress
2007	Nirmal Singh Kahlon	Shiromani Akali Dal
2012	Tripat Rajinder Singh Bajwa	Indian National Congress
2017	Tripat Rajinder Singh Bajwa	Indian National Congress
2022	Tripat Rajinder Singh Bajwa	Indian National Congress

== Election results ==
=== 2027 ===
Punjab Assembly election, 2027: Fatehgarh Churian
Party	Candidate	Votes	%	±%
INC				
SAD				
AAP	Harjobanjit Singh Randhawa			
AD (WPD)				New entry
BJP				New entry
NOTA	None of the above			
Majority				
Turnout				

=== 2022 ===
Punjab Assembly election, 2022: Fatehgarh Churian
Party	Candidate	Votes	%	±%
INC	Tripat Rajinder Singh Bajwa	46,311	35.95	▼8.04
SAD	Lakhbir Singh Lodhinangal	40,766	31.65	
AAP	Balbir Singh Pannu	35,819	27.81	
SAD(A)	Kulwant Singh Majhail	3,390	2.63	
NOTA	None of the above	812	0.63	▲0.23
Majority		5,545	4.30	
Turnout		128,822	72.43	▼2.61
Registered electors		177,849		

=== 2017 ===
Punjab Assembly election, 2017: Fatehgarh Churian
Party	Candidate	Votes	%	±%
INC	Tripat Rajinder Singh Bajwa	54,348	43.99	▼4.85
SAD	Nirmal Singh Kahlon	52,349	42.37	▼5.91
AAP	Gurvinder Singh Shampura	14,665	11.87	
CPI(ML)L	Gulzar Singh	857	0.69	
BSP	Amarjit Singh	605	0.49	
APP	Peter Masih	526	0.43	
NOTA	None of the above	489	0.40	
Independent	Manpreet Singh	206	0.17	
Majority		1999	1.61	
Turnout		124,045	75.04	▼1.73
Registered electors		165,313		

=== 2012 ===
Punjab Assembly election, 2012: Fatehgarh Churian
Party	Candidate	Votes	%	±%
INC	Tripat Rajinder Singh Bajwa	56,176	48.84	
SAD	Nirmal Singh Kahlon	55,537	48.28	▼2.99
Independent	Phuna Masih Alias Phula Masih	1,134	0.99	
PPoP	Sukhpreet Singh	831	0.72	
BSP	Banwari Lal	818	0.71	
SAD(M)	Kulwant Singh	535	0.47	
Majority		639	0.56	
Turnout		115,031	80	▼3.95
Registered electors		143,791		

=== 2007 ===
Punjab Assembly election, 2007: Fatehgarh
Party	Candidate	Votes	%	±%
SAD	Nirmal Singh Kahlon	49,909	51.27	
INC	Sukhjinder Singh Randhawa	44,081	45.28	
CPI	Gulzar Singh	1,096	1.13	
Independent	Gurbax Singh	800	0.82	
LJP	Jaswinder Singh	525	0.54	
Independent	Sukhjinder Singh Randhawa	435	0.45	
BSP	Jagir Singh	326	0.34	
SAD(M)	Balwinder Singh	170	0.17	
Majority		5,828	5.99	
Turnout		97,342	83.95	
Registered electors		115,957		
