= Sukhjinder Singh Randhawa =

Indian politician (born 2 February 1959)

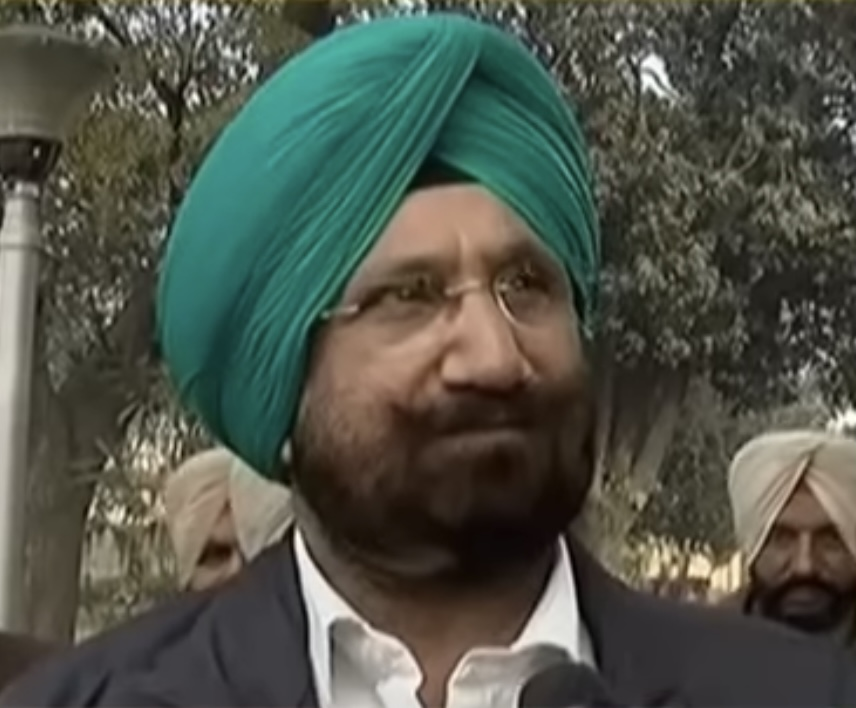

General Secretary of AICC for Rajasthan
- Incumbent
- Assumed office December 2022
- Preceded by: Ajay Maken

4th Deputy Chief Minister of Punjab
- In office 20 September 2021 – 16 March 2022 Serving with Om Parkash Soni
- Governor: Banwarilal Purohit
- Chief Minister: Charanjit Singh Channi
- Preceded by: Sukhbir Singh Badal
- Succeeded by: Vacant

Member of Legislative Assembly, Punjab
- In office March 2012 – 4 June 2024
- Preceded by: Nirmal Singh Kahlon
- Succeeded by: Gurdeep Singh Randhawa
- Constituency: Dera Baba Nanak

Member of Parliament, Lok Sabha
- Incumbent
- Assumed office 4 June 2024
- Preceded by: Sunny Deol
- Constituency: Gurdaspur

Personal details
- Born: 1 February 1959 (age 67) Dharowali, Punjab, India
- Party: Indian National Congress

Sukhjinder Singh Randhawa (born 1 February 1959) is an Indian politician and former Deputy Chief Minister of Punjab. He is currently serving as a member of the Lok Sabha, the lower house of Indian parliament. He is a member of the Indian National Congress and has served as a member of Punjab Legislative Assembly (MLA) representing Dera Baba Nanak.

== Early life ==
Sukhjinder Singh was born on 1 February 1959 at Dharowali village, tehsil Dera Baba Nanak in Gurdaspur district. His father's name was Santokh Singh who served as Punjab congress chief twice and was one of the most senior congressmen of his time. Sukhjinder completed his Matric education from Government school Chandigarh in 1975.

== Political career ==
Randhawa first successfully contested Punjab Legislative Assembly from Fatehgarh Churian in 2002 defeating Akali dal's Nirmal Singh Kahlon. In 2012, he was elected from new constituency Dera Baba Nanak. He was one of the 42 INC MLAs who submitted their resignation in protest as part of their decision of the Supreme Court of India ruling Punjab's termination of the Sutlej-Yamuna Link (SYL) water canal unconstitutional.

=== Assets and liabilities declared during elections ===
During the 2022 Punjab Legislative Assembly election, he declared Rs. 5,11,87,545 as an overall financial asset and Rs. 15,93,063 as financial liability.

== Member of Legislative Assembly ==
He represented the Dera Baba Nanak Assembly constituency as MLA in Punjab Assembly. The Aam Aadmi Party gained a strong 79% majority in the sixteenth Punjab Legislative Assembly by winning 92 out of 117 seats in the 2022 Punjab Legislative Assembly election. MP Bhagwant Mann was sworn in as Chief Minister on 16 March 2022.

Committee assignments of Punjab Legislative Assembly

- Member (2022–23) Committee on Estimates

== Electoral performance ==
2024 Indian general election: Gurdaspur
Party	Candidate	Votes	%	±%
INC	Sukhjinder Singh Randhawa	364,043	33.78	▼9.36
BJP	Dinesh Singh	2,81,182	26.09	▼24.52
AAP	Amansher Singh	2,77,252	25.72	▲23.21
SAD	Daljit Singh Cheema	85,500	7.93	New
SAD(A)	Gurinder Singh Bajwa	25,765	2.39	New
NOTA	None of the Above	3,354	0.31	▼0.56
Majority		82,861	7.69	▼0.22
Turnout		10,77,826		
Registered electors		16,05,204		
INC gain from BJP		Swing		

Punjab Assembly election, 2022: Dera Baba Nanak
Party	Candidate	Votes	%	±%
INC	Sukhjinder Singh Randhawa	52,555	36.70	▼6.13
SAD	Ravikaran Singh Kahlon	52,089	36.40	▼5.58
AAP	Gurdeep Singh Randhawa	31,742	22.2	▲9.99
Independent	Jagjit Singh	2,684	1.86	
BJP	Kuldeep Singh	1,913	1.33	
NOTA	None of the above	1,099	0.6	
Majority		466	0.33	
Turnout		1,44,359	73.3	
Registered electors		194,613		
INC hold				

Punjab Assembly election, 2017: Dera Baba Nanak
Party	Candidate	Votes	%	±%
INC	Sukhjinder Singh Randhawa	60,385	42.83	▼7.39
SAD	Sucha Singh Langah	59191	41.98	▼6.01
AAP	Gurpartap Singh Khushalpur	17222	12.21	New
NOTA	None of the above	961	0.68	
Majority		1194		
Turnout				
Registered electors		183,088		
INC hold				

Punjab Assembly election, 2012: Dera Baba Nanak
Party	Candidate	Votes	%	±%
INC	Sukhjinder Singh Randhawa	66,294	50.22	
SAD	Sucha Singh	63,354	47.99	
Majority		3060		
Turnout				
INC gain from SAD				
