= Dera Baba Nanak Assembly constituency =

Legislative Assembly constituency in Punjab State, India

Coordinates: 32.03°N 75.02°E

Dera Baba Nanak
- Constituency No. 10 for the Punjab Legislative Assembly

Constituency details
- Country: India
- State: Punjab
- District: Gurdaspur
- Lok Sabha constituency: Gurdaspur
- Total electors: 194,613 (in 2022)
- Reservation: None

Member of Legislative Assembly
- 16th Punjab Legislative Assembly
- Incumbent Gurdeep Singh Randhawa
- Party: Aam Aadmi Party
- Elected year: By-Election 2024

Dera Baba Nanak Assembly constituency (Sl. No.: 10) is a Punjab Legislative Assembly constituency in Gurdaspur district, Punjab state, India.

== Members of Legislative Assembly ==
Most successful parties from Dera Baba Nanak Vidhan Sabha
1. INC (8 Times) (53.3%)
2. SAD (5 Times) (33.3%)
3. AAP (1 Time) (6.67%)
4. INC (I) (1 Time) (6.67%)

Year	Member	Picture	Party
1951	Joginder Singh		Indian National Congress
1957	Waryam Singh		Indian National Congress
1962	Makhan Singh		Shiromani Akali Dal
1967	Makhan Singh		Shiromani Akali Dal
1969	Santokh Singh Randhawa		Indian National Congress
1972	Santokh Singh Randhawa		Indian National Congress
1977	Dr. Jodh Singh		Shiromani Akali Dal
1980	Santokh Singh Randhawa		Indian National Congress (Indira)
1985	Nirmal Singh Kahlon		Shiromani Akali Dal
2002	Sukhjinder Singh Randhawa		Indian National Congress
2007	Nirmal Singh Kahlon		Shiromani Akali Dal
2012	Sukhjinder Singh Randhawa		Indian National Congress
2017	Sukhjinder Singh Randhawa		Indian National Congress
2022	Sukhjinder Singh Randhawa		Indian National Congress
2024*	Gurdeep Singh Randhawa		Aam Aadmi Party

== Election results ==
=== 2027 ===
Punjab Assembly election, 2027: Dera Baba Nanak
Party	Candidate	Votes	%	±%
AAP				
AD (WPD)				New entry
INC				
BSP				
SAD				New entry
BJP	Raju pandit			
NOTA	None of the above			
Majority				
Turnout				

=== 2024 by-election ===
Punjab Legislative Assembly by-election 2024: Dera Baba Nanak
Party	Candidate	Votes	%	±%
AAP	Gurdeep Singh Randhawa	59,104	47.68	▲25.48
INC	Jatinder Kaur Randhawa	53,405	43.08	▲6.38
BJP	Ravikaran Singh Kahlon	6,505	5.25	▲3.92
SAD(A)	Lovepreet Singh Toofan	2,358	1.9	New
NOTA	None of the Above	875	0.71	▲0.11
Majority		5,699	4.6	▲4.27
Turnout		123,972	64.01	▼9.29
AAP gain from INC		Swing		

=== 2022 ===
Punjab Assembly election, 2022: Dera Baba Nanak
Party	Candidate	Votes	%	±%
INC	Sukhjinder Singh Randhawa	52,555	36.70	▼6.13
SAD	Ravikaran Singh Kahlon	52,089	36.40	▼5.58
AAP	Gurdeep Singh Randhawa	31,742	22.2	▲9.99
IND	Jagjit Singh	2,684	1.86	
BJP	Kuldeep Singh	1,913	1.33	
NOTA	None of the above	1,099	0.6	
Majority		466	0.33	
Turnout		1,44,359	73.3	
Registered electors		194,613		
INC hold				

=== 2017 ===
Punjab Assembly election, 2017: Dera Baba Nanak
Party	Candidate	Votes	%	±%
INC	Sukhjinder Singh Randhawa	60,385	42.83	▼7.39
SAD	Sucha Singh Langah	59191	41.98	▼6.01
AAP	Gurpartap Singh Khushalpur	17222	12.21	New
NOTA	None of the above	961	0.68	
Majority		1194		
Turnout				
Registered electors		183,088		
INC hold				

=== 2012 ===
Punjab Assembly election, 2012: Dera Baba Nanak
Party	Candidate	Votes	%	±%
INC	Sukhjinder Singh Randhawa	66,294	50.22	
SAD	Sucha Singh	63,354	47.99	
Majority		3060		
Turnout				
INC gain from SAD				

=== 2007 ===
2007 Punjab election: 79. Dera Baba Nanak
Party	Candidate	Votes	%	±%
SAD	Nirmal Singh Kahlon			
Majority				
Turnout				

=== 2002 ===
2002 Punjab election: 79. Dera Baba Nanak
Party	Candidate	Votes	%	±%
INC	Sukhjinder Singh Randhawa			
Majority				
Turnout				

=== 1985 ===
1985 Punjab election: 79. Dera Baba Nanak
Party	Candidate	Votes	%	±%
SAD	Nirmal Singh Kahlon			
Majority				
Turnout				

=== 1980 ===
1980 Punjab election: 79. Dera Baba Nanak
Party	Candidate	Votes	%	±%
INC	Santokh Singh Randhawa			
Majority				
Turnout				

=== 1977 ===
1977 Punjab election: 79. Dera Baba Nanak
Party	Candidate	Votes	%	±%
Akali Dal	Dr. Jodh Singh			
Majority				
Turnout				

=== 1972 ===
1972 Punjab election: 79. Dera Baba Nanak
Party	Candidate	Votes	%	±%
INC	Santokh Singh Randhawa			
Majority				
Turnout				

=== 1969 ===
1969 Punjab election: 79. Dera Baba Nanak
Party	Candidate	Votes	%	±%
INC	Santokh Singh Randhawa			
Majority				
Turnout				

=== 1967 ===
1967 Punjab election: 79. Dera Baba Nanak
Party	Candidate	Votes	%	±%
Akali Dal	Makhan Singh			
Majority				
Turnout				

=== 1962 ===
1962 Punjab election: 126. Dera Baba Nanak
Party	Candidate	Votes	%	±%
Akali Dal	Makhan Singh	19,693		
INC	Waryam Singh	14157		
Majority				
Turnout				

=== 1957 ===
1957 Punjab election: 79. Dera Baba Nanak
Party	Candidate	Votes	%	±%
INC	Waryam Singh	15,325		
Independent	Makhan Singh	12392		
Majority				
Turnout				

=== 1951 ===
1951 Punjab election: 98. Dera Baba Nanak
Party	Candidate	Votes	%	±%
INC	Joginder Singh	9,291		
SAD	Gurbakhsh Singh	7570		
Majority				
Turnout				
