= Chhotepur =

- Village
- Location in Punjab, India Chhotepur (India)
- Coordinates: 32°17′37″N 75°37′38″E
- Country: India
- State: Punjab
- District: Gurdaspur

Languages
  - Official: Punjabi
- Time zone: UTC+5:30 (IST)

Chhotepur is a village in Dhariwal tehsil, Gurdaspur district, Punjab, India. The population was 1,109 at the 2011 Indian census.

== Notable people ==
- Sucha Singh Chhotepur, politician and former state minister
