= Sri Hargobindpur Assembly constituency =

Legislative Assembly constituency in Punjab State, India

Coordinates: 31.69°N 75.47°E

Sri Hargobindpur
- Constituency No. 8 for the Punjab Legislative Assembly

Constituency details
- Country: India
- State: Punjab
- District: Gurdaspur
- Lok Sabha constituency: Hoshiarpur
- Total electors: 181,209
- Reservation: SC

Member of Legislative Assembly
- 16th Punjab Legislative Assembly
- Incumbent Amarpal Singh
- Party: AAP
- Elected year: 2022

Sri Hargobindpur is a Punjab Legislative Assembly constituency in Gurdaspur district, Punjab state, India.

== Members of the Legislative Assembly ==
Most successful parties from Sri Hargobindpur Vidhan Sabha
1. SAD (8 Times) (50.0%)
2. INC (6 Times) (37.5%)
3. AAP (1 Time) (6.25%)
4. CPI (1 Time) (6.25%)

Year	Member	Party
1952	Uttam Singh	Indian National Congress
1957	Gurbachan Singh	Indian National Congress
1962	Satnam Singh	Indian National Congress
1967	Satnam Singh	Indian National Congress
1969	Karam Singh	Shiromani Akali Dal
1972	Waryam Singh	Indian National Congress
1977	Natha Singh	Shiromani Akali Dal
1980	Natha Singh	Shiromani Akali Dal
1985	Natha Singh	Shiromani Akali Dal
1992	Gurnam Singh	Communist Party of India
1997	Balbir Singh Bath	Shiromani Akali Dal
2002	Balbir Singh Bath	Shiromani Akali Dal
2007	Balbir Singh Bath	Shiromani Akali Dal
2012	Des Raj Dhugga	Shiromani Akali Dal
2017	Balwinder Singh	Indian National Congress
2022	Amarpal Singh	Aam Aadmi Party

== Election results ==
=== 2027 ===
Punjab Assembly election, 2027: Sri Hargobindpur
Party	Candidate	Votes	%	±%
AAP				
AD (WPD)				New entry
INC				
BSP				
SAD				
BJP				
NOTA	None of the above			
Majority				
Turnout				

=== 2022 ===
Punjab Assembly election, 2022: Sri Hargobindpur
Party	Candidate	Votes	%	±%
AAP	Amarpal Singh	53,205	42.74	▲23.10
SAD	Rajanbir Singh	36,242	29.12	▼2.75
INC	Mandeep Singh Rangar Nangal	24,563	19.73	▼26.75
SSM	Kamaljit Singh	4,757	3.82	new
BJP	Baljinder Singh	1,318	1.07	
NOTA	None of the above	1,398	1.13	
Majority		16,963	13.62	
Turnout		124,473	68.69	
Registered electors		181,209		
AAP gain from INC		Swing		

=== 2017 ===
Punjab Assembly election, 2017: Sri Hargobindpur
Party	Candidate	Votes	%	±%
INC	Balwinder Singh Laddi	57,489	47.48	
SAD	Manjit Singh	39,424	31.87	
AAP	Amarpal Singh	24,294	19.64	
APP	Om Prakash	889	0.72	
BSP	Gurmeet Singh	653	0.53	
Independent	Sarabjit Singh	560	0.45	
Independent	Sikander Singh	388	0.31	
Majority		16963	16.32	
Registered electors		170,470		
