= Zahidpur =

- Village
- Country: India
- State: Punjab
- District: Gurdaspur
- Tehsil: Batala
- Region: Majha

Government
  - Type: Panchayat raj
  - Body: Gram panchayat

Area
  - Total: 119 ha (290 acres)

Population (2011)
  - Total: 85; 46/39 ♂/♀
  - Scheduled Castes: 64; 36/28 ♂/♀
  - Total Households: 14

Languages
  - Official: Punjabi
- Time zone: UTC+5:30 (IST)
- Telephone: 01871
- ISO 3166 code: IN-PB
- Vehicle registration: PB-18
- Website: gurdaspur.nic.in

Zahidpur is a village in Batala in Gurdaspur district of Punjab State, India. It is located 35 kilometres (22 mi) from sub district headquarter, 32 kilometres (20 mi) from district headquarter and 15 kilometres (9.3 mi) from Sri Hargobindpur. The village is administrated by Sarpanch an elected representative of the village.

== Demography ==
As of 2011, the village has a total number of 14 houses and a population of 85 of which 46 are males while 39 are females. According to the report published by Census India in 2011, out of the total Population, 64 people are from Schedule Caste and the village does not have any Schedule Tribe population so far.

== See also ==
- List of villages in India
