= Gurdaspur district =

- District
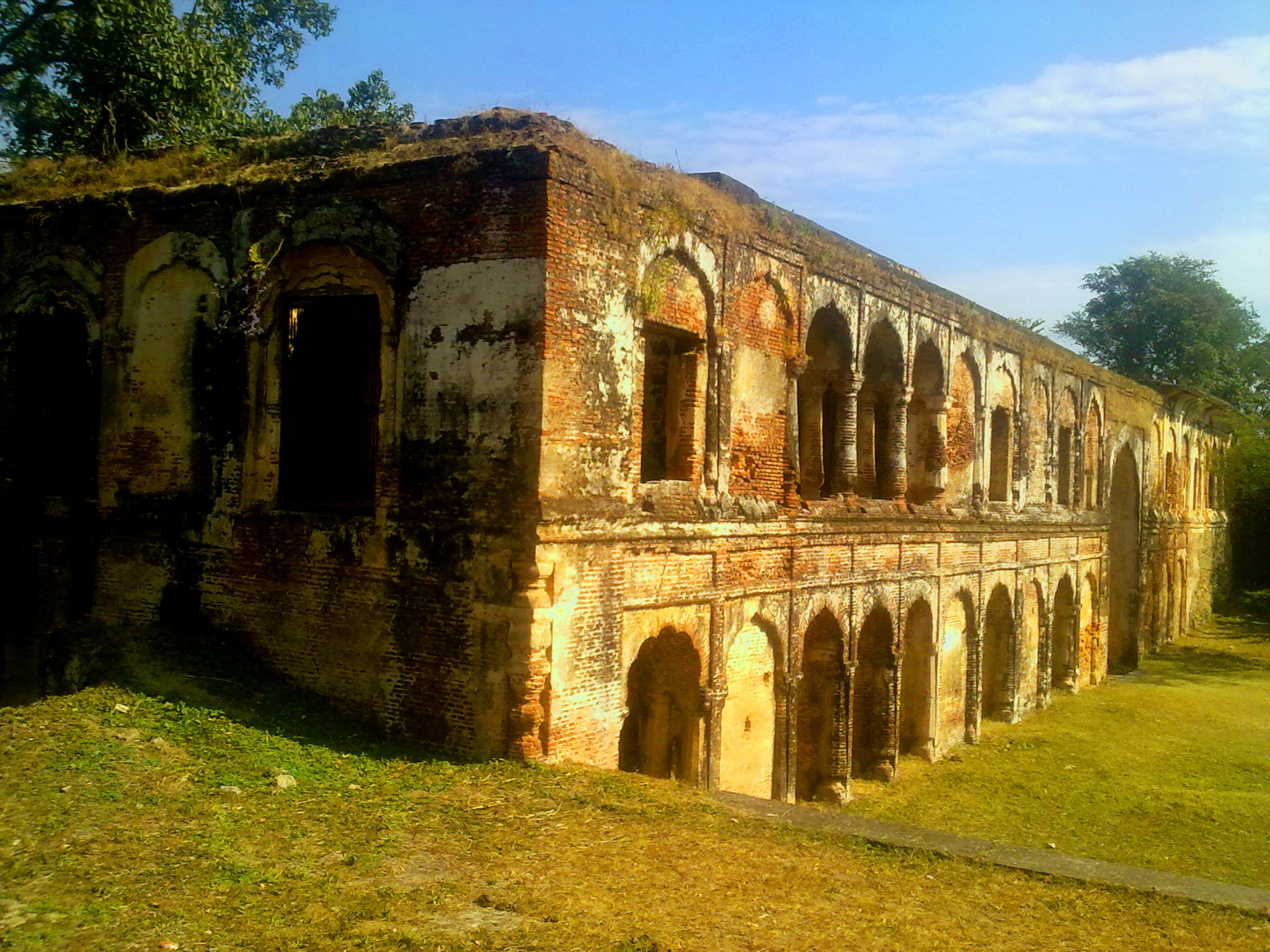
- Sujanpur Fort

- Location in Punjab
- Coordinates: 31°55′N 75°15′E
- Country: India
- State: Punjab
- Headquarters: Gurdaspur

Area
  - Total: 2,610 km^{2} (1,010 sq mi)

Population (2011)
  - Total: 2,298,323
  - Density: 881/km^{2} (2,280/sq mi)

Languages
  - Official: Punjabi
- Time zone: UTC+5:30 (IST)
- Vehicle Code: PB 06, PB 18, PB 58, PB 85, PB 99
- Literacy: 79.95%
- Website: gurdaspur.nic.in

Gurdaspur district is a district in the Majha region of the state of Punjab, India. Gurdaspur is the district headquarters. It internationally borders Narowal District of Pakistani Punjab, and the districts of Amritsar, Pathankot, Kapurthala and Hoshiarpur. Two main rivers Beas and Ravi passes through the district. The Mughal emperor Akbar is said to have been enthroned in a garden near Kalanaur, a historically important town in the district. The district is at the foothills of the Himalayas. The district is part of the Jalandhar division.

As of 2011 it is the third most populous district of Punjab (out of 22), after Ludhiana and Amritsar. Batala, with 31% of the district's population, is its largest city.

== History ==
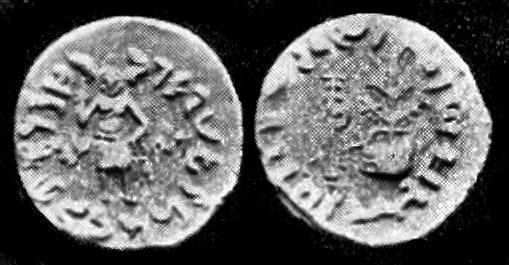
Coin of Dharaghosha, king of the Audumbaras, in the Indo-Greek style, from Gurdaspur district, c. 100 BCE. Obv: Standing figure, probably of Vishvamitra, Kharoshthi legend, around: Mahadevasa Dharaghoshasa/Odumbarisa "Great Lord King Dharaghosha/Prince of Audumabara", across: Viçvamitra "Vishvamitra". Rev: Trident battle-axe, tree with railing, Brahmi legend identical in content to the obverse.

=== Medieval period ===
On 14 February 1556 AD, Akbar was crowned as emperor at Kalanaur, a town in the district, after the death of his father Humayun.

This area was used as a base by Banda Singh Bahadur to raid the area up to Lahore. The Mughal emperor Bahadur Shah conducted an expedition against him in 1711, but with only temporary effect. Banda Singh Bahadur fought his last battle against Mughals at Gurdas Nangal and was captured.

On 17 May 1746, the Chhota Ghallughara (smaller Sikh genocide) took place. Approximately 10,000 to 15,000 Sikhs were killed in battle on a single day in Kahnuwan, near Gurdaspur. Under the Lahore governorship of Yahiya Khan, Lakhpat Rai (revenue minister) and Shah Navaz Khan were directed to avenge the killing of Lakhpat Rai's brother, Jaspat Rai. An official decree to exterminate Sikhs was issued.

In about 1633 CE, during the rule of Shah Jahan, the Badshahi canal was constructed for carrying waters to the Shalimar Gardens at Lahore. Maharaja Ranjit Singh constructed Hansali canal to carry waters to the tank of the Golden Temple.

=== British Raj ===
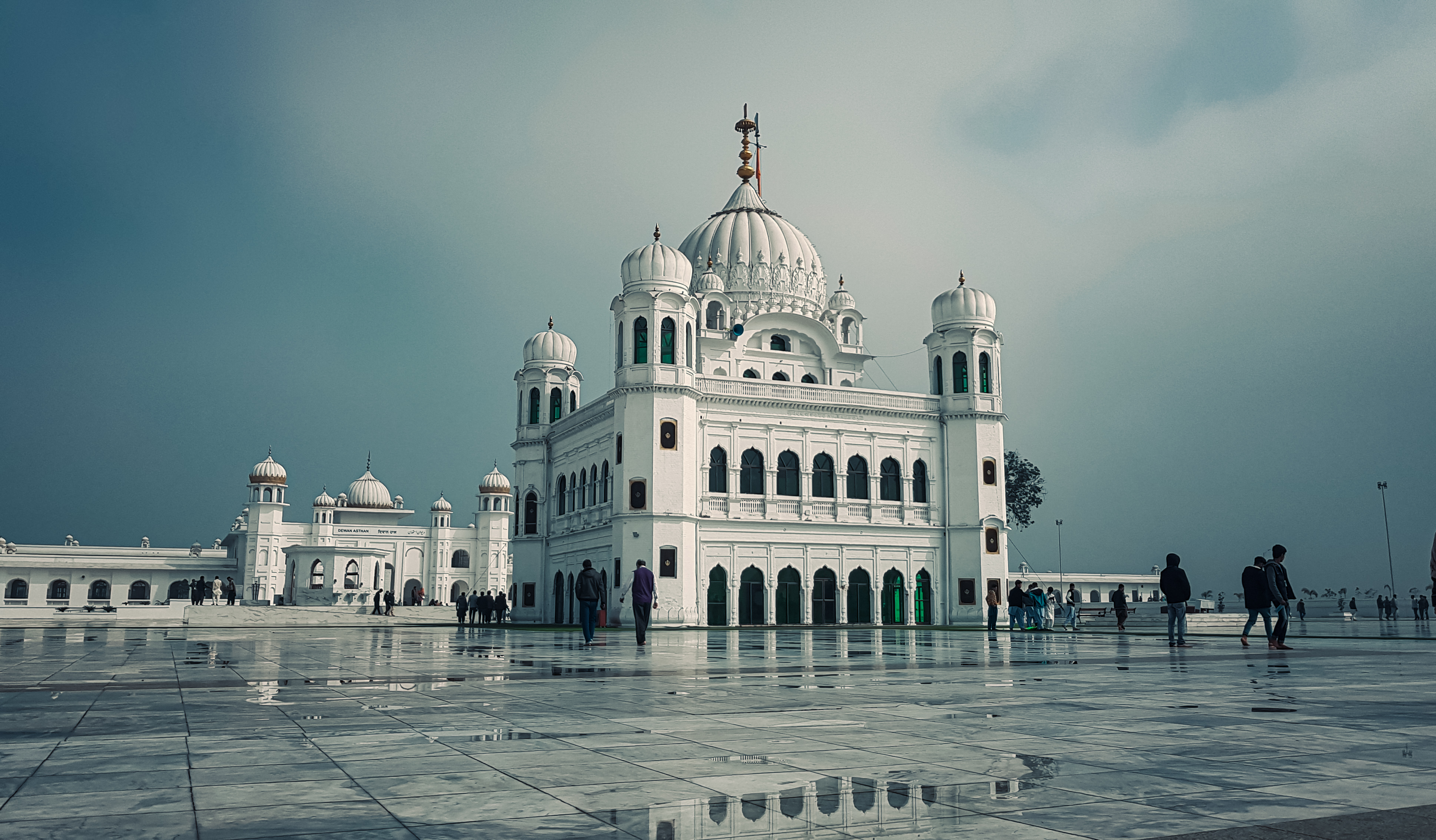
Gurdwara Darbar Sahib Kartarpur, which commemorates the first Sikh commune founded by Guru Nanak on the right bank of Ravi, went to Pakistan in the Partition of India

Gurdaspur district was annexed by the British from its former Sikh rulers after the Second Anglo-Sikh War of 1848–1849. During British Rule the district of Gurdaspur was a subdivision of Lahore Division, the district itself was administratively subdivided into four tehsils: Gurdaspur, Batala, Shakargarh and Pathankot. During the India's first war of independence, on 12 July 1857, battle of Trimmu Ghat was fought between the forces of British and Indian rebel sepoys on the left bank of Ravi. Trimmu Ghat was about 9 miles west of Gurdaspur city in the district. Most of the Indian rebel sepoys were killed in the battle.

According to the 1881 census the population of the district was 823,695 this had risen by over 100,000 to 943,922 in the 1891 census. However, the 1901 census recorded a fall in population – 940,334, this was largely due to emigration – some 44,000 settlers settling in Chenab colony. According to the 1901 census there were 463,371 Muslims (49%), 380,636 Hindus (over 40%) and 91,756 (10%) Sikhs. Mirza Ghulam Ahmad who founded the Ahmadiyya movement had followers here.

During the partition of India in 1947 the future of Gurdaspur was highly contested. According to the 1941 census, the population of this district had a narrow 51.14% Muslim majority. Radcliffe Award of the boundary gave only the Shakargarh tehsil of the district to Pakistan, and the rest to India. The Muslim population of the eastern tehsils migrated to Pakistan as refugees, and the Hindus and Sikhs of Shakargarh migrated to Gurdaspur after crossing the Ravi Bridge. They settled and spread in the Gurdaspur district. According to the 1951 census, there were around 2,97,581 displaced persons who had settled in the district, who formed about 34.96% of the district population. Of the total displaced persons 1,59,716 were males and 1,37,865 females. The origin of most of them were pakistani districts of Sialkot (1,93,182), Shakargarh (43,203), Lyallpur (17,783) and Shekhupura (8,826).

=== Modern India ===
New tehsil of Dera Baba Nanak was created in 1995 and Dhar Kalan in 1996. On 27 July 2011 a part of district was carved out to form a new Pathankot district, which was earlier part of Gurdaspur. The Pathankot district comprises two sub-divisions of Pathankot and Dharkalan along with two sub-tehsils namely Narot Jaimal Singh and Bamial.

On 27 July 2015, there was a terror attack in Dinanagar. In this, 7 people died, of which 2 were civilians, 2 policemen, 2 home guards and one Superintendent of Police (SP). It was the first major terror attack in Punjab since 1995.

On 14 December 2014, new tehsil of Kalanaur was created. New tehsil of Dinanagar was created in May 2018. Earlier, they were sub-tehsils.

== Geography ==
=== Location ===
The Gurdaspur district is in the north of Punjab state. It falls in the Jalandhar division and is sandwiched between rivers Ravi and Beas. The district lies between north-latitude 31°36' and 32°34' and east longitude 74°56' and 75°24' and shares common boundaries with Pathankot district in the north, Beas River in the north-east, Hoshiarpur district in the south-east, Kapurthala district in the south, Amritsar district in the south-west and Pakistan in the north-west. It is a border district of Punjab and lies along India-Pakistan border.

As of 2011, 5.24% of the district area, including Pathankot, consists of forest area.

== Government and politics ==
=== Politics ===
No.	Constituency	Name of MLA	Party	Bench
4	Gurdaspur	Barindermeet Singh Pahra	Indian National Congress	Opposition
5	Dina Nagar (SC)	Aruna Chaudhary	Indian National Congress	Opposition
6	Qadian	Partap Singh Bajwa	Indian National Congress	Opposition
7	Batala	Amansher Singh (Shery Kalsi)	Aam Aadmi Party	Government
8	Sri Hargobindpur (SC)	Amarpal Singh	Aam Aadmi Party	Government
9	Fatehgarh Churian	Tripat Rajinder Singh Bajwa	Indian National Congress	Opposition
10	Dera Baba Nanak	Gurdeep Singh Randhawa	Aam Aadmi Party	Government

=== Tehsil ===
Tehsil
Sr. No.	Subdivision /Tehsil	Inhabited Villages	Uninhabited Villages	Area(km^{2})	Population	Density Per km^{2}
1.	Gurdaspur	679	37	1,369	744,092	544
2.	Batala	347	5	936	618,105	660
3.	Dera Baba Nanak	131	6	305	115,660	379
4.	Kalanaur					
5.	Dinanagar					
Total		1,157	48	2,610	1,477,857	566

=== Sub Tehsils (Total : 7) ===
Sub-Tehsil
Sr. No.	Sub Tehsil Name
1.	Kahnuwan
2.	Sri Hargobindpur
3.	Qadian
4.	Fatehgarh Churian
5.	Dhariwal
6.	Naushera Majha Singh
7.	Dorangla

=== C.D. Blocks (Total : 11) ===
C.D. Blocks
Sr. No.	Block Name
1.	Gurdaspur
2.	Kalanaur
3.	Dhariwal
4.	Kahnuwan
5.	Dinanagar
6.	Batala
7.	Fatehgarh Churian
8.	Dera Baba Nanak
9.	Sri Hargobindpur
10.	Qadian
11.	Dorangla

==== Municipal Corporation (Nagar Nigam) ====
Municipal Corporation Name
Sr. No.	Corporation Name
1.	Batala

==== Municipal Councils ====
Municipal Name
Sr. No.	Municipal Name
1.	Gurdaspur
2.	Dhariwal
3.	Dinanagar
4.	Sri Hargobindpur
5.	Dera Baba Nanak
6.	Fatehgarh Churian
7.	Qadian

==== Villages ====
- Abdal
- Bangowani
- Barnala
- Bhoon
- Qila Lal Singh
- Chakarrayian
- Dabanwala
- Khojala
- Ram nagar
- Sahowal
- Talwandi Jheuran
- Vero Nangal
- Zahadpur
- Zahidpur
- Ali Nangal
- Bhagowal
- Daaduwal
- Dalam
- Gunopur
- Kahnuwan
- Mallianwal
- Naagan de dere
- Rorr khehra
- Sarhwali

=== Subdistricts of Gurdaspur district ===
According to the Indian government's integrated online directory, Gurdaspur district is divided into the following subdistricts (tehsils/subdivisions) and blocks:

- Subdistricts
  1. Batala
  2. Dera Baba Nanak
  3. Dinanagar
  4. Fatehgarh Churian
  5. Gurdaspur
  6. Kalanaur
- Blocks:
  1. Batala
  2. Dera Baba Nanak
  3. Dhariwal
  4. Dinanagar
  5. Dorangla
  6. Fatehgarh Churian
  7. Gurdaspur
  8. Kahnuwan
  9. Kalanaur
  10. Qadian
  11. Sri Hargobindpur

== Demographics ==
=== Population ===
Historical population
Year	Pop.	±% p.a.
1901	702,372	—
1911	622,008	−1.21%
1921	634,394	+0.20%
1931	718,523	+1.25%
1941	854,968	+1.75%
1951	851,140	−0.04%
1961	980,868	+1.43%
1971	1,229,464	+2.28%
1981	1,513,435	+2.10%
1991	1,756,732	+1.50%
2001	2,103,455	+1.82%
2011	2,298,323	+0.89%

According to the 2011 census Gurdaspur district has a population of 2,298,323, roughly equal to the nation of Latvia or the US state of New Mexico. This gives it a ranking of 196th in India (out of a total of 640). The district has a population density of 649 inhabitants per square kilometre (1,680/sq mi). Its population growth rate over the decade 2001–2011 was 9.3%. Gurdaspur has a sex ratio of 895 females for every 1000 males, and a literacy rate of 79.95%.

After the separation of the Pathankot tehsil into a separate district in 2011, the residual district has a population of 1,621,725 of which 1,260,572 were rural and 361,153 were urban. Scheduled Castes have a population of 373,544 (23.03%) of the population. Punjabi is the predominant language, spoken by 98.27% of the population.

=== Gender ===
The table below shows the sex ratio of Gurdaspur through the years, according to various census years. Note:- The figure for 2011 does not include the data of the areas that currently form Pathankot district, which were separated from Gurdaspur on that year, to form a new district.

Decadal sex ratio of Gurdaspur district by census years
Year (Census)	Sex Ratio
2011	907
2001	890
1991	903
1981	907
1971	890
1961	869
1951	846
1941	843
1931	809
1921	794
1911	774
1901	853

The table below shows the child sex ratio of children below the age of 6 years in the rural and urban areas of Gurdaspur district. Note:- The data till year 2001 also includes the data from the areas currently in the Pathankot district.

Child sex ratio of children below the age of 6 years in Gurdaspur district
Year	Urban	Rural
2011	828	818
2001	762	797

According to the National Family Health Survey - 4 (2015–16), 88.2% of the total women between the ages of 15 and 49 years in Gurdaspur district were literate, this rate was 86.7% for rural areas of the district. For men in the same age group, 90.4% were literate and this rate was 90.7% for rural areas. According to the same survey, 62.7% of the women of the same age group had 10 or more years of schooling and this rate was 57.6% for rural areas.

=== Rural and Urban ===
The table below shows the percentage of rural population through the decades. Note:- The separation of the areas in the current Pathankot district in 2011, may have significantly changed the numbers and figures for that year.

Percentage of rural population in Gurdaspur district by years
Year	Percentage
2011	77.73%
2001	74.56%
1991	78.02%
1981	78.31%
1971	79.7%

The table below gives the absolute number of rural and urban population through the years. Note:- The separation of the areas in the current Pathankot district in 2011, may have significantly changed the numbers and figures for that year.

Rural and Urban population of Gurdaspur in absolute numbers by years
Year	Urban	Rural
2011	3,61,153	12,60,572
2001	5,35,223	15,68,788
1991	3,86,412	13,71,796
1981	3,28,268	11,85,167
1971	2,49,084	9,80,165

=== Religion ===
Religion in Gurdaspur District, 2011
1. Sikhism (58.6%)
2. Hinduism (29.4%)
3. Christianity (10.4%)
4. Islam (0.82%)
5. Other (0.80%)

Sikhism is the largest religion in the residual district with 950,016 (58.58%), while Hinduism is the second-largest with 476,095 (29.36%). Christians are the third-largest community with 169,295 (10.44%), the highest share of Christians in the state, and Muslims 13,350 (0.82%). Before Partition, Undivided Gurdaspur district had a slight Muslim majority with a large Hindu minority and smaller Sikh and Christian populations. The area which now forms the current district had a Muslim majority and a large Sikh minority, with smaller Hindu and Christian populations.

Religion in Gurdaspur District (2011 district borders) (Note: 1941: Includes Gurdaspur and Batala tehsils, which are the tehsils which now cover the area of Gurdaspur district)
Religious group	1941		2011	
Religious group	Pop.	%	Pop.	%
Islam	380,775	53.72%	13,350	0.82%
Sikhism	193,108	27.24%	950,016	58.58%
Hinduism (Note: 1931-1941: Including Ad-Dharmis)	90,412	12.75%	476,095	29.36%
Christianity	43,176	6.09%	169,295	10.44%
Others (Note: Including Jainism, Buddhism, Zoroastrianism, Judaism or not stated)	1,401	0.20%	12,969	0.80%
Total Population	708,872	100%	1,621,725	100%

The table below shows the population of different religions in absolute numbers in the urban and rural areas of Gurdaspur district. Note:- The separation of the areas in the current Pathankot district in 2011, may have significantly changed the numbers and figures for that year.

Absolute numbers of different religious groups in Gurdaspur district
Religion	Urban (2011)	Rural (2011)	Urban (2001)	Rural (2001)	Urban (1991)	Rural (1991)
Hindu	4,78,989	5,95,343	3,79,724	6,16,522	2,51,831	4,76,531
Sikh	1,40,536	8,62,338	1,28,697	8,06,266	66,020	6,09,380
Christian	26,151	1,50,436	21,668	1,27,315	8,713	90,924
Muslim	8,292	5,351	4,329	807	1,540	164
Other religions	5,351	11,512	807	2,246	164	510

Populations of Muslim and Non-Muslims in Gurdaspur District, based on Census Data. In the 1881 Census, Non-Muslims were in majority, at 52.49%. While the Non-Muslims had a slight majority, the proportion of the Muslim population increased in the following decades. By the 1930s, Muslims were the majority population in the District.

Religious groups in Gurdaspur District (British Punjab province era)
Religious group	1881		1891		1901		1911		1921		1931		1941	
Religious group	Pop.	%	Pop.	%	Pop.	%	Pop.	%	Pop.	%	Pop.	%	Pop.	%
Islam	391,400	47.52%	459,039	48.63%	463,371	49.28%	408,216	48.78%	422,877	49.62%	493,216	50.8%	589,923	51.14%
Hinduism	359,329	43.62%	396,582	42.01%	380,636	40.48%	284,017	33.94%	258,823	30.37%	255,949	26.36%	290,774	25.21%
Sikhism	72,395	8.79%	85,837	9.09%	91,756	9.76%	121,078	14.47%	137,625	16.15%	178,471	18.38%	221,261	19.18%
Christianity	463	0.06%	2,400	0.25%	4,471	0.48%	23,365	2.79%	32,832	3.85%	43,243	4.45%	51,522	4.47%
Jainism	108	0.01%	64	0.01%	72	0.01%	73	0.01%	20	0%	15	0%	25	0%
Zoroastrianism	0	0%	0	0%	28	0%	22	0%	12	0%	2	0%	6	0%
Buddhism	0	0%	0	0%	0	0%	0	0%	3	0%	2	0%	0	0%
Judaism	—N/a	—N/a	0	0%	0	0%	0	0%	0	0%	0	0%	0	0%
Others	0	0%	0	0%	0	0%	0	0%	0	0%	0	0%	0	0%
Total population	823,695	100%	943,922	100%	940,334	100%	836,771	100%	852,192	100%	970,898	100%	1,153,511	100%
Note: British Punjab province era district borders are not an exact match in the present-day due to various bifurcations to district borders — which since created new districts — throughout the historic Punjab Province region during the post-independence era that have taken into account population increases.

Religion in the Tehsils of Gurdaspur District (1941)
Tehsil	Hinduism		Islam		Sikhism		Christianity		Jainism		Others (Note: Including Anglo-Indian Christians, British Christians, Buddhism, Zoroastrianism, Judaism, Tribals, others, or not stated)		Total	
Tehsil	Pop.	%	Pop.	%	Pop.	%	Pop.	%	Pop.	%	Pop.	%	Pop.	%
Gurdaspur Tehsil	57,281	17.42%	171,498	52.16%	76,695	23.32%	22,506	6.84%	22	0.01%	817	0.25%	328,819	100%
Batala Tehsil	33,610	8.84%	209,277	55.07%	116,413	30.63%	20,670	5.44%	0	0%	83	0.02%	380,053	100%
Pathankot Tehsil	83,330	54.42%	59,548	38.89%	7,580	4.95%	2,307	1.51%	3	0%	366	0.24%	153,134	100%
Shakargargh Tehsil	116,553	39.98%	149,600	51.32%	20,573	7.06%	4,779	1.64%	0	0%	0	0%	291,505	100%
Note1: British Punjab province era tehsil borders are not an exact match in the present-day due to various bifurcations to tehsil borders — which since created new tehsils — throughout the historic Punjab Province region during the post-independence era that have taken into account population increases. Note2: Tehsil religious breakdown figures for Christianity only includes local Christians, labeled as "Indian Christians" on census. Does not include Anglo-Indian Christians or British Christians, who were classified under "Other" category.

Religion in the Tehsils of Gurdaspur District (1921)
Tehsil	Hinduism		Islam		Sikhism		Christianity		Jainism		Others (Note: Including Buddhism, Zoroastrianism, Judaism, Tribals, others, or not stated)		Total	
Tehsil	Pop.	%	Pop.	%	Pop.	%	Pop.	%	Pop.	%	Pop.	%	Pop.	%
Gurdaspur Tehsil	46,297	19.77%	122,606	52.36%	48,817	20.85%	16,406	7.01%	20	0.01%	0	0%	234,146	100%
Batala Tehsil	45,129	16.37%	145,672	52.84%	73,212	26.56%	11,682	4.24%	0	0%	0	0%	275,695	100%
Pathankot Tehsil	76,752	59.27%	48,431	37.4%	3,293	2.54%	1,011	0.78%	0	0%	15	0.01%	129,502	100%
Shakargargh Tehsil	90,645	42.59%	106,168	49.88%	12,303	5.78%	3,733	1.75%	0	0%	0	0%	212,849	100%
Note: British Punjab province era tehsil borders are not an exact match in the present-day due to various bifurcations to tehsil borders — which since created new tehsils — throughout the historic Punjab Province region during the post-independence era that have taken into account population increases.

== Economy ==
The income of Municipalities and Municipal corporations in the Gurdaspur district from municipal rates and taxes in the year 2018 was 380,930 thousand rupees.

In 2020–21, there were a total of 7,740 registered Micro and Small Enterprises (MSE) and Artisan units in Gurdaspur district, which provided employment to 56,298 people. There were 9 registered Medium and Large industrial Unit, which provided employment to 2,709 people.

In 2010–11, there were 7,840 registered industrial units which provided employment to 55,541 people. The major export items of large scale industries in Gurdaspur were rice, sugar and knitting yarn.

The table below shows the number of registered working factories and workers employed by selected manufacturing industries in Gurdaspur district as of 2017.

Number of registered working factories and workers employed by selected manufacturing industries in Gurdaspur district in 2017
Industry	Factories	Workers
Chemicals and chemical products	1	3
Non-metallic mineral products	9	81
Beverages	13	109
Food products and Beverages products	16	202

== Health ==
As of 2018, the number of registered doctors in the Gurdaspur district were 1,642 and registered nurses were 6,118. Which means the average population served per doctor for that year was 1,058. In the year 2017, Gurdaspur district recorded 12 malaria cases, which was tenth lowest in Punjab.

The table given below shows the population served per doctor in Gurdaspur district, by years.

Population served per doctor in Gurdaspur district by years
Year	Population	Year	Population
2018	1,058	2000	2,490
2012	1,671	1999	2,382
2010	1,845	1998	2,377
2008	2,091	1997	2,441
2007	2,108	1996	2,536
2006	1,973	1995	2,558
2005	2,228	1994	2,598
2004	2,408	1993	3,019
2003	2,478	1992	2,043
2002	2,452	1991	2,806
2001	2,547	1990	2,986

In 2016, 88.5% women in Gurdaspur district gave birth in a health facility, which was the second lowest in the state. In 2016, 42.1% of the children upto 59 months of age received postnatal care within two days of their birth, which was fourth lowest in the state. In the same year, 83.7% of the women received postnatal care within two days of childbirth, which was fifth lowest in the state.

The table below shows the data from the district nutrition profile of children below the age of 5 years, in Gurdaspur, as of year 2020.

District nutrition profile of children under 5 years of age in Gurdaspur, year 2020
Indicators	Number of children (<5 years)	Percent (2020)
Stunted	43,739	25%
Wasted	16,481	9%
Severely wasted	7,883	5%
Underweight	26,648	15%
Overweight/obesity	11,353	7%
Anemia	1,09,852	70%
Total children	1,74,398	

The table below shows the district nutrition profile of Gurdaspur of women between the ages of 15 and 49 years, as of year 2020.

District nutritional profile of Gurdaspur of women of 15–49 years, in 2020
Indicators	Number of women (15–49 years)	Percent (2020)
Underweight (BMI <18.5 kg/m^2)	81,803	11%
Overweight/obesity	3,01,906	41%
Hypertension	2,70,494	37%
Diabetes	1,11,229	15%
Anemia (non-preg)	4,09,457	56%
Anemia (preg)	10,904	43%
Total women (preg)	25,287	
Total women	7,35,639	

The table below shows the current use of family planning methods by currently married women between the ages of 15 and 49 years, in Gurdaspur district.

Family planning methods used by women between the ages of 15 and 49 years, in Gurdaspur district
Method	Total (2015–16)	Rural (2015–16)
Female sterilization	42.1%	44.7%
Male sterilization	0.4%	0.0%
IUD/PPIUD	4.1%	3.8%
Pill	1.8%	2.6%
Condom	20.1%	19.5%
Any modern method	68.5%	70.7%
Any method	74.5%	76.6%
Total unmet need	5.2%	5.5%
Unmet need for spacing	2.7%	2.8%

The table below shows the number of road accidents and people affected in Gurdaspur district by year.

Road accidents and people affected in Gurdaspur district by year
Year	Accidents	Killed	Injured	Vehicles Involved
2022	191	161	101	242
2021	178	156	79	234
2020	178	158	92	266
2019	227	162	109	308

== Notable people ==
=== Science and Academia ===
- Naresh Trehan, a cardiovascular and cardiothoracic surgeon
- Ishfaq Ahmad - Pakistani nuclear physicist
- Bhai Ram Singh - An influential architect
- Sucha Singh Gill, an economist with areas of expertise in development economics, international economics and economy of Punjab
- Sardul Singh Guraya, a biologist, known for his contributions in the fields of reproductive physiology and developmental biology

=== Sports ===
- Dinesh Khanna - Badminton player
- Surjit Singh Randhawa - hockey player
- Manpreet Gony - cricketer
- Prabhjot Singh (Indian hockey player)
- Shivil Kaushik - cricketer

=== Military ===
- Capt. Gurbachan Singh Salaria - Param Vir Chakra awardee, posthumous
- Lt. Navdeep Singh - Ashoka Chakra awardee, posthumous
- Dilbagh Singh - Air Chief Marshal
- Admiral Sureesh Mehta, 19th Chief of the Indian Navy (31 October 2006 until 31 August 2009) and the first service chief in the Indian armed forces to be born after Indian Independence
- Lt. Col. Sarbjit Singh Kalha, Indian Companion of the Distinguished Service Order

=== Art and Entertainment ===
- Dev Anand - Indian actor
- Premchand Dogra - Bodybuilder, Mr. Universe, Mr. India
- Chetan Anand - director
- Vijay Anand - director
- Vinod Khanna - Indian actor
- Shiv Kumar Batalvi - Punjabi writer
- Romesh Sharma - Indian Actor and producer
- Jasbir Jassi - Bhangra singer
- Guru Randhawa - Punjabi singer
- Preet Harpal - Punjabi singer and actor
- Iqbal Bahu - Pakistani Sufi singer
- Alla Rakha - Tabla player
- Gurpreet Ghuggi - actor and comedian-turned-politician
- Ranjit Bawa - Punjabi singer and actor
- Nimrat Khaira - Punjabi singer and actress
- Satinder Satti - anchor-singer
- Varinder Singh Ghuman - bodybuilder
- Principal Sujan Singh - Punjabi writer
- Sobha Singh - painter
- Mumtaz Mufti - Urdu writer
- Nasim Hijazi - Urdu novelist, historian and writer.
- Sunanda Sharma - Punjabi singer and actress
- Harnaaz Sandhu - Miss Universe 2021
- AP Dhillon - Singer/songwriter, music producer

=== Politics ===
- Ashwani Kumar - Former Union Minister
- Robert Masih Nahar - Spanish senator
- Teja Singh (singh sabha movement)
- Pratap Singh Bajwa - Rajya Sabha MP from Punjab

=== Other ===
- Teja Singh Akarpuri - Jathedar of Akal Takht
- Baba Jaimal Singh - Punjabi spiritual leader
- Mirza Nasir Ahmad (Khalifatul Massih III)
- Mirza Tahir Ahmad (Khalifatul Massih IV)
- Mirza Ghulam Ahmad - Founder of the Ahmaddiya movement
- Mirza Basheer-ud-Din Mahmood Ahmad (Khalifatul Massih II)
- Ghulam Ahmed Pervez - Islamic scholar
