= Talwandi Jheuran =

- Village
- Interactive map of Talwandi Jheuran
- Coordinates: 31.8574°N 75.2106°E
- Country: India
- State: Punjab
- District: Gurdaspur
- Tehsil: Batala
- Region: Majha

Government
  - Type: Panchayat raj
  - Body: Gram panchayat

Area
  - Total: 113 ha (280 acres)

Population (2011)
  - Total: 1,258; 662/596 ♂/♀
  - Scheduled Castes: 37; 17/20 ♂/♀
  - Total Households: 238

Languages
  - Official: Punjabi
- Time zone: UTC+5:30 (IST)
- PIN: 143505
- Telephone: 01871
- ISO 3166 code: IN-PB
- Vehicle registration: PB-18
- Website: gurdaspur.nic.in

Talwandi Jheuran, also spelt Talwandi Jheeran, is a village in Batala in Gurdaspur district of Punjab State, India. It is located 3 kilometres (1.9 mi) from sub district headquarter, 38 kilometres (24 mi) from district headquarter and 3 kilometres (1.9 mi) from Sri Hargobindpur. The village is administrated by a Sarpanch, an elected representative of the village.

== Demography ==
As of 2011, the village has a total number of 238 houses and a population of 1258 of which 662 are males while 596 are females. According to the report published by Census India in 2011, out of the total population of the village 37 people are from Schedule Caste and the village does not have any Schedule Tribe population so far.

== See also ==
- List of villages in India
