= Vero Nangal =

Vero Nangal Guruana Sahib
- village
- Location in Punjab, India Vero Nangal (India)
- Coordinates: 31.701831°N 75.226113°E
- Country: India
- State: Punjab
- Region: Punjab
- District: Gurdaspur
- Taluka: Batala

Government
  - Type: sarpanch

Languages
  - Official: Punjabi (Gurmukhi)
  - Regional: Punjabi
- Time zone: UTC+5:30 (IST)
- PIN: 143505
- Vehicle registration: PB-06
- Nearest city: Mehta Chowk
- Sex ratio: 1000/877 ♂/♀

Vero Nangal is a village in the Gurdaspur district of Punjab, India. It is predominantly inhabited by people of the Guruana Sahib clan.

== Geography ==
Vairo Nangal is Side of Amritsar(approx.) It is located in the Batala tehsil of Gurdaspur district in the India Punjab. It is located on the Jalandhar-(Beas)-Batala road Mehta chowk is one of the famous landmark for Vairo Nangal while coming from the way to Amritsar. Rangar Nangal (1 km), Adowali (1 km), Patti Nanak Nangal (1 km), Nasir Pur (3 km), Chaudhriwal (4 km) are the nearby Villages to Vairo Nangal. Vairo Nangal is surrounded by Batala Tehsil towards North, Rayya-6 Tehsil towards South, Qadian Tehsil towards East, Dhilwan Tehsil towards South.

Batala, Qadian, Amritsar, Kapurthala are the nearby Cities to Vairo Nangal.

This Place is in the border of the Gurdaspur District and Amritsar District. Amritsar District Majitha-3 is west towards this place.

== Culture ==
The village is predominated by the Jatt People. Lohri is the most popular festival of the village. Agriculture is the most common source of business.

Punjabi is the mother tongue as well as the official language of the village.

== Economy ==
As common in the region, the primary occupation for the villagers is agriculture, but many have gone overseas to find employment and elsewhere.
