= Amarpal Singh =

Indian politician

MLA, Punjab
- Incumbent
- Assumed office 2022
- Preceded by: Balwinder Singh Laddi
- Constituency: Sri Hargobindpur

Personal details
- Party: Aam Aadmi Party

Amarpal Singh is the MLA from Sri Hargobindpur Assembly constituency. He is a member of the Aam Aadmi Party. He is also an Advocate. He has completed his graduation from GkSM college Tanda Urmar in 2006.

== Member of Legislative Assembly ==
He represents the Sri Hargobindpur Assembly constituency as MLA in Punjab Assembly. The Aam Aadmi Party gained a strong 79% majority in the sixteenth Punjab Legislative Assembly by winning 92 out of 117 seats in the 2022 Punjab Legislative Assembly election. MP Bhagwant Mann was sworn in as Chief Minister on 16 March 2022.

Committee assignments of Punjab Legislative Assembly

- Member (2022–23) Committee on Public Undertakings
- Member (2022–23) Committee on Co-operation and its allied activities

== Assets and liabilities declared during elections ==
During the 2022 Punjab Legislative Assembly election, he declared Rs. 23,69,000 as an overall financial asset and Rs. nil as financial liability.

== Electoral performance ==
Punjab Assembly election, 2022: Sri Hargobindpur
Party	Candidate	Votes	%	±%
AAP	Amarpal Singh	53,205	42.74	▲23.10
SAD	Rajanbir Singh	36,242	29.12	▼2.75
INC	Mandeep Singh Rangar Nangal	24,563	19.73	▼26.75
SSM	Dr Kamaljit Singh	4,757	3.82	new
NOTA	None of the above	1,398	1.13	
Majority		16,963	13.62	
Turnout		124,473	68.69	
Registered electors		181,209		
AAP gain from INC		Swing		

Punjab Assembly election, 2017: Sri Hargobindpur
Party	Candidate	Votes	%	±%
INC	Balwinder Singh Laddi	57,489	47.48	
SAD	Manjit Singh	39,424	31.87	
AAP	Amarpal Singh	24,294	19.64	
APP	Om Prakash	889	0.72	
BSP	Gurmeet Singh	653	0.53	
Independent	Sarabjit Singh	560	0.45	
Independent	Sikander Singh	388	0.31	
Majority		16963	16.32	
Registered electors		170,470		

State Legislative Assembly
Preceded by -	Member of the Punjab Legislative Assembly from Sri Hargobindpur Assembly constituency 2022 –	Incumbent
