= Sucha Singh Gill =

Indian economist of Punjabi origins

Sucha Singh Gill is an Indian economist of Punjabi origins. His areas of expertise include Development Economics, International Economics and Economy of Punjab.

== Biography ==
Sucha Singh Gill was born on June 10, 1949, in a village Babri Jiwanwal of Gurdaspur district in Punjab, India. His early childhood and education was in rural village. By the time he was 19 years old, he finished his bachelor's degree. With his teachers advice, he went to Chandigarh to do his MA. Gill completed his M.A. in 1971 in Economics and started teaching immediately. He joined in MLN College Yamunanagar August, 1971 and shifted to Himachal Pradesh University, Shimla in March 1972. He joined Punjabi university, Patiala in August, 1972. In 1980 he went to earn his Ph.D. degree on "Indo-Soviet Economic relations since 1953" from Punjabi University, Patiala. He later went on to become a Professor and Head of department in the Department of Economics at Punjabi University, Patiala. He is a member of Centre for Research in Rural and Industrial Development.

== Books ==
1. Political Economy of Indo-Soviet Relations, Rajesh Publications, New Delhi, 1983.
2. Resource Mobilization and Economic Development (Co-editor with P.S. Raikhy), Guru Nanak Dev University, Amritsar, 1988.
3. Economic development and structural change in Punjab: some policy issues, Iqbal Singh Memorial Trust, Ludhiana, 1994.
4. Land Reforms in India, Vol. 6: Intervention for Capitalist Transformation in Punjab and Haryana, Sage Publications, New Delhi 2001.
5. Globalization and Indian State: Education, Health and Agricultural Extension Services in Punjab (Co-authors: Sukhwinder Singh and Jaswinder Singh Brar) Aakar Books, New Delhi, 2010.
6. Economic Cooperation and Infrastructural Linkages Between Two Punjabs: Way Ahead, (Co-authors: R.S. Ghuman, Inderjit Singh, Lakhwinder Singh, Sukhwinder Singh and Jaswinder Singh Brar), CRRID, Chandigarh, 2010.
7. Economic and Environmental Sustainability of the Asian Region (Co-editors: Lakhwinder Singh and Reena Marwaha), Routledge, New Delhi, 2010.
8. Understanding North-West Indian Economy, edited by H.S. Shergill, Sucha Singh Gill and Gurmail Singh, Serials Publications, 2011
9. South and Central Asia: Quest for Peace and Cooperation (Co-editors Rashpal Malhotra et al.) CRRID Publications, Chandigarh 2013
10. Perspectives on Bilateral and Regional Cooperation: South and Central Asia(Co-editor with Rashpal Malhotra et al), CRRID Publication, Chandigarh, 2013.
11. Leveraging Economic Growth in South Asia, (Co-editors Rashpal Malhotra et al.) CRRID Publications, Chandigarh 2014
12. Central Asia and Its Neighbours: Prospects of India's Cooperation, (Co-editor with Rashpal Malhotra et al.) CRRID Publications, Chandigarh, 2014.
13. India's North-East and Asiatic South-East: Beyond Borders (Co-editor with Rashpal Malhotra) CRRID, Chandigarh,2015.
14. Look and Act East Policy : Potentials and Prospects ( Co-editor with Rashpal Malhotra) CRRID Publications, Chandigarh, 2015.
15. Indian Perspective of Relations With South and Central Asia (Co-editor with Rashpal Malhotra) CRRID Publications, Chandigarh, 2017.
16. Socio- Economic Profile of Rural India Series-III, Volume Two (Editor with Varunendra Vikram Singh), Centre for Rural Studies, LBSNAA, Mussoorie/ Concept Publishing Company PVT. LTD, New Delhi, 2017.
17. Chasing High Growth Rate and Tryst with Inclusiveness: India during 2004-14, CRRID Publications, Chandigarh, 2019.
18. Philosophy of Guru Nanak: Searching peace, Harmony& Happiness, CRRID Publications, Chandigarh,2020.

== Career ==
=== Positions held at Punjabi University, Patiala ===
- i) Head, Department of Economics (1997-2000).
- ii) Dean, Social Sciences (January 2005-December 2006).
- iii) Dean, Academic Affairs (September 2006- August 2008).
- iv) Dean, Research (September 2008-June 2009).
- v) Programme Co-Ordinator, (from 2007- 2010) Centre for South West Asia (Pakistan-Afghanistan).

=== Positions held at other places ===
- i) Professor & Head, Punjab School of Economics, Guru Nanak Dev University, Amritsar (1987–88).
- ii) Dean, Faculty of Business and Economics, Guru Nanak Dev University, Amritsar (1987–88).
- iii) Member, Punjab State Planning Board (2000-2002).
- iv) Member, Punjab and Haryana Committee on Impact of WTO on Agriculture and Industry (2000-2004).
- v) Vice-president, Indian Association of Social Science Institute, New Delhi (2008-2010).
- vi) Vice-president Indian Society of Labor Economics (2000-2008).
- vii) Conference President of Indian Society of Labor Economics, Annual Conference held at Department of Economics, Mohanlal Sukhadia University, Udaipur, Rajasthan (17-19 December 2011).
- Vii) Director General CRRID, Chandigarh (July 2010- November 2014)
- Viii) Member, Working Group for the 70th Round of NSS (January to December 2013), Ministry of Statistics and Programme Implementation, Government of India.
- IX) Member, Board of Governors, Institute for Studies in Industrial Development, New Delhi.
- X) Member, Board of Governors, Institute of Development Studies, Lucknow.
- XI) Member, Governing Body, Bhai Vir Singh Sadan, New Delhi.
- XII) Member, Revenue Commission, Government of Punjab, Since February 2018.
- XIII) Member, Border and Kandi Area Development Board, Government of Punjab, Since June 2019.
