= Bangowani =

Village in Punjab, India

Coordinates: 31.938°N 75.222°E

Bangowani is a village located in the Gurdaspur district, Punjab, India. Most of the inhabitants are of the Sandhu and Saran clans. Nearby villages include Dulanagal, Sahari, and Virk. The village is situated on the west bank of the Uppar Bari Canal. The population is around 1400. The most common industry is agriculture.
