= Jagdish Sahni =

Indian politician (1944–2021)

Jagdish Raj Sahni

Member of Punjab Legislative Assembly
- In office 2007–2012
- Preceded by: Ashwani Sekhri
- Succeeded by: Ashwani Sekhri
- Constituency: Batala
- In office 1992–2002
- Preceded by: Ashwani Sekhri
- Succeeded by: Ashwani Sekhri
- Constituency: Batala

Personal details
- Born: 1944 Shakargarh, Punjab, Pakistan
- Died: 2 May 2021 (aged 76–77) Amritsar
- Party: Bharatiya Janata Party

Jagdish Raj Sahni was an Indian politician from Bharatiya Janata Party. Sahni was elected as a member of the Punjab Legislative Assembly from Batala (constituency) in 1992, 1997 and 2007. Sahni defeated Ashwani Sekhri of Indian National Congress by 46 votes in 2007 Punjab Assembly election. Sahni died from cardiac arrest aged 77.
