= Khojala =

Coordinates: 31°45′N 75°23′E

- Village
- Interactive map of Khojala
- Country: India
- State: Punjab
- District: Gurdaspur
- Tehsil: Batala
- Region: Majha

Government
  - Type: Panchayat raj
  - Body: Gram panchayat

Area
  - Total: 650 ha (1,600 acres)

Population (2011)
  - Total: 3,359; 1,746/1,613 ♂/♀
  - Scheduled Castes: 1,162; 617/545 ♂/♀
  - Total Households: 650

Languages
  - Official: Punjabi
- Time zone: UTC+5:30 (IST)
- Telephone: 01871
- ISO 3166 code: IN-PB
- Vehicle registration: PB-18
- Website: gurdaspur.nic.in

Khojala is a village in Batala in Gurdaspur district of Punjab State, India. It is located 22 kilometres (14 mi) from sub district headquarter, 42 kilometres (26 mi) from district headquarter and 8 kilometres (5.0 mi) from Sri Hargobindpur. The village is administrated by Sarpanch an elected representative of the village.

== Demography ==
As of 2011, the village has a total number of 650 houses and a population of 3359 of which 1746 are males and 1613 are females. According to the report published by Census India in 2011, out of the total population of the village, 1162 people are from Scheduled Caste and the village does not have any Scheduled Tribe population.

== See also ==
- List of villages in India
