= Dina Nagar Assembly constituency =

Legislative Assembly constituency in Punjab State, India

Coordinates: 32.14°N 75.47°E

Dina Nagar
- Constituency No. 5 for the Punjab Legislative Assembly

Constituency details
- Country: India
- State: Punjab
- District: Gurdaspur
- Lok Sabha constituency: Gurdaspur
- Total electors: 192,562 (in 2022)
- Reservation: SC

Member of Legislative Assembly
- 16th Punjab Legislative Assembly
- Incumbent Aruna Chaudhary
- Party: Indian National Congress
- Elected year: 2022

Dina Nagar is a Punjab Legislative Assembly constituency covering Dina Nagar in Gurdaspur district, Punjab state, India.

== Members of the Legislative Assembly ==
Most successful parties from Dina Nagar Vidhan Sabha
1. INC (7 Times) (63.6%)
2. BJP (2 Times) (18.2%)
3. JP (1 Time) (9.09%)
4. INC (I) (1 Time) (9.09%)

Year	Member	Party
1972	Jai Muni	Indian National Congress
1977	Gian Chand	Janata Party
1980	Jai Muni	Indian National Congress (Indira)
1985	Jai Muni	Indian National Congress
1992	Krishna Kumar	Indian National Congress
1997	Roop Rani	Bharatiya Janata Party
2002	Aruna Chaudhary	Indian National Congress
2007	Sita Ram Kashyap	Bharatiya Janata Party
2012	Aruna Chaudhary	Indian National Congress
2017	Aruna Chaudhary	Indian National Congress
2022	Aruna Chaudhary	Indian National Congress

== Election results ==
=== 2027 ===
Punjab Assembly election, 2027: Dina Nagar
Party	Candidate	Votes	%	±%
INC				
AAP	Shamsher Singh			
AD (WPD)				New entry
BJP				
BSP				
SAD				New entry
NOTA	None of the above			
Majority				
Turnout				

=== 2022 ===
Punjab Assembly election, 2022: Dina Nagar
Party	Candidate	Votes	%	±%
INC	Aruna Chaudhary	51,133	36.60	▼19.22
AAP	Shamsher Singh	50,002	35.79	▲27.86
BJP	Renu Kashyap	20,560	14.72	▼16.42
BSP	Kamaljeet Chawla	15,534	11.12	▲10.67
IND	Kulwant Singh	1,584	1.11	▼3.94
NOTA	None of the above	931	0.67	▼0.28
Majority		1,131	0.80	
Turnout		139,708		
Registered electors		192,562		
INC hold		Swing		

=== 2017 ===
Punjab Assembly election, 2017: Dina Nagar
Party	Candidate	Votes	%	±%
INC	Aruna Chaudhary	72,176	55.82	▲2.91
BJP	Bishan Dass	40,259	31.14	▼11.41
AAP	Joginder Singh	10,258	7.93	new
NOTA	None of the above	1,231	0.95	−−
Majority		31,917	24.45	
Turnout		130,525	71.80	▼2.26
Registered electors		181,776		
INC hold		Swing		

=== 2012 ===
Punjab Assembly election, 2012: Dina Nagar
Party	Candidate	Votes	%	±%
INC	Aruna Chaudhary	65,993	52.91	▲5.59
BJP	Bishan Dass	53,066	42.55	▼5.59
Majority		12,927	10.36	
Turnout		124,717	74.06	▲1.51
INC gain from BJP		Swing		

=== 2007 ===
Punjab Assembly election, 2007: Dina Nagar
Party	Candidate	Votes	%	±%
BJP	Sita Ram	49,173	48.14	▲3.60
INC	Aruna Chaudhary	48,331	47.32	▼0.73
Majority		842	0.82	
Turnout		102,126	74.06	▲8.96
BJP gain from INC		Swing		
