= Dharowali =

- Village
- Location in Punjab, India
- Coordinates: 31.966633°N 75.048312°E
- Country: India
- State: Punjab
- District: Gurdaspur

Population (2001)
  - Total: 1,154

Languages
  - Official: Punjabi
- Time zone: UTC+5:30 (IST)
- PIN: 143605

Dharowali is a village near Dera Baba Nanak, Gurdaspur District in Punjab state, India. The population was 1,154 at the 2001.

The residence of this village are mostly Jatt Randhawa and they are the descendants of Bhai Lachhman Singh Dharowali who was burnt alive upside down from a tree during Saka Nankana Sahib.

== See also ==
- Saka Nankana
