= Zahadpur =

- Village
- Country: India
- State: Punjab
- District: Gurdaspur
- Tehsil: Batala
- Region: Majha

Government
  - Type: Panchayat raj
  - Body: Gram panchayat

Area
  - Total: 315 ha (780 acres)

Population (2011)
  - Total: 1,450; 780/670 ♂/♀
  - Scheduled Castes: 532; 284/248 ♂/♀
  - Total Households: 265

Languages
  - Official: Punjabi
- Time zone: UTC+5:30 (IST)
- Telephone: 01871
- ISO 3166 code: IN-PB
- Vehicle registration: PB-18
- Website: gurdaspur.nic.in

Zahadpur is a village in Batala in Gurdaspur district of Punjab State, India. It is located 12 kilometres (7.5 mi) from sub district headquarter, 42 kilometres (26 mi) from district headquarter and 42 kilometres (26 mi) from Sri Hargobindpur. The village is administrated by Sarpanch an elected representative of the village.

== Demography ==
As of 2011, the village has a total number of 265 houses and a population of 1450 of which 780 are males while 670 are females. According to the report published by Census India in 2011, out of the total population of the village 532 people are from Schedule Caste and the village does not have any Schedule Tribe population so far.

== See also ==
- List of villages in India
