= Roop Rani =

Indian politician

Roop Rani was a Bharatiya Janata Party MLA in the Punjab Legislative Assembly representing Dina Nagar from 1997 to 2002 and was succeeded by Aruna Chaudhary.
