= Batala Assembly constituency =

Legislative Assembly constituency in Punjab State, India

Coordinates: 31.84°N 74.76°E

Batala
- Constituency No. 7 for the Punjab Legislative Assembly

Constituency details
- Country: India
- State: Punjab
- District: Gurdaspur
- Lok Sabha constituency: Gurdaspur
- Total electors: 188,862 (in 2022)
- Reservation: None

Member of Legislative Assembly
- 16th Punjab Legislative Assembly
- Incumbent Amansher Singh (Shery Kalsi)
- Party: AAP
- Elected year: 2022

Batala Assembly constituency (Sl. No.: 7) is a Punjab Legislative Assembly constituency in Gurdaspur district, Punjab state, India.

== Members of Legislative Assembly ==
Most successful parties from Batala Vidhan Sabha
1. INC (8 Times) (50.0%)
2. BJP (3 Times) (18.8%)
3. AAP (1 Time) (6.25%)
4. BJS (1 Time) (6.25%)
5. INC (I) (1 Time) (6.25%)
6. JP (1 Time) (6.25%)
7. SAD (1 Time) (6.25%)

Election	Name	Party
1952	Gurbachan Singh	Indian National Congress
1957	Gorakh nath	Indian National Congress
1962	Mohan Lal	Indian National Congress
1967	Mohan Lal	Indian National Congress
1969	Bikramjit Singh	Bharatiya Jana Sangh
1972	Vishwa Mittar Sekhri	Indian National Congress
1977	Panna Lal Nayyar	Janata Party
1980	Gopal Krishna Chatrath	Indian National Congress (Indira)
1985	Ashwani Sekhri	Indian National Congress
1992	Jagdish Sahni	Bharatiya Janata Party
1997	Jagdish Sahni	Bharatiya Janata Party
2002	Ashwani Sekhri	Indian National Congress
2007	Jagdish Sahni	Bharatiya Janata Party
2012	Ashwani Sekhri	Indian National Congress
2017	Lakhbir Singh Lodhinangal	Shiromani Akali Dal
2022	Amansher Singh	Aam Aadmi Party

== Election results ==
=== 2027 ===
Punjab Assembly election, 2027: Batala
Party	Candidate	Votes	%	±%
AAP	Amansher Singh (Shery Kalsi)			
INC				
SAD				
AD (WPD)				New entry
BSP				
BJP				
NOTA	None of the above			
Majority				
Turnout				

=== 2022 ===
Punjab Assembly election, 2022: Batala
Party	Candidate	Votes	%	±%
AAP	Amansher Singh (Shery Kalsi)	55,570	43.57	▲15.61
INC	Ashwani Sekhri	27,098	21.25	▼13.01
SAD	Sucha Singh Chhotepur	23,251	18.23	▼16.62
BJP	Fatehjang Singh Bajwa	13,879	10.88	New
NOTA	None of the above	658	0.52	▼0.06
Majority		28,472	22.32	
Turnout		127,545		
Registered electors		188,862		
AAP gain from SAD		Swing		

=== 2017 ===
Punjab Assembly election, 2017: Batala
Party	Candidate	Votes	%	±%
SAD	Lakhbir Singh Lodhinangal	42,517	34.65	▼5.30
INC	Ashwani Sekhri	42,032	34.26	▼21.43
AAP	Gurpreet Ghuggi	34,302	27.96	new
NOTA	None of the above	713	0.58	−−
Majority		485	0.39	
Turnout		123,414	69.83	▼4.06
Registered electors		176,725		
SAD gain from INC		Swing		

=== 2012 ===
Punjab Assembly election, 2012: Batala
Party	Candidate	Votes	%	±%
INC	Ashwani Sekhri	66,806	55.69	▲8.95
SAD	Lakhbir Singh Lodhinangal	47,921	39.95	−−
Majority		18,885	15.74	
Turnout		119,965	73.89	▲1.22
INC gain from BJP		Swing		

=== 2007 ===
Punjab Assembly election, 2007: Batala
Party	Candidate	Votes	%	±%
BJP	Jagdish Sahni	47,936	46.82	▲6.36
INC	Ashwani Sekhri	47,850	46.74	▼9.63
Majority		86	0.08	
Turnout		102,373	72.67	▲6.09
BJP gain from INC		Swing		
