= Ashwani Sekhri =

Indian politician

MLA, Punjab
- In office 1985 - 1990
- Preceded by: Gopal Krishan Chatrath
- Succeeded by: Jagdish Sahni
- Constituency: Batala
- In office 2002 - 2007
- Preceded by: Jagdish Sahni
- Succeeded by: Jagdish Sahni
- Constituency: Batala
- In office 2012 - 2017
- Preceded by: Jagdish Sahni
- Succeeded by: Lakhbir Singh Lodhinangal
- Constituency: Batala

Minister of State for Tourism and Culture, Health and family welfare, industry
- In office 2002 - 2007

Personal details
- Born: March 26, 1959 (age 67)
- Party: Bhartiya Janta Party
- Spouse: Anuja Sekhri
- Children: Abhinav Sekhri, Jaitavya Sekhri

Ashwani Sekhri is an Indian politician and a member of Bharatiya Janata Party BJP. He was a Member of Punjab Legislative Assembly (MLA) and represented Batala.

== Early life ==
His father's name is Vishwa Mitter Sekhri.

== Political career ==
Sekhri first successfully contested Punjab Legislative Assembly from Batala in 1985. He was re-elected from Batala in 2002 and 2012. In 2002, he was appointed Minister of State for Tourism and Culture. In 2009, he was appointed spokesperson of Punjab Pradesh Congress Committee. He was one of the 42 INC MLAs who submitted their resignation in protest of a decision of the Supreme Court of India ruling Punjab's termination of the Sutlej-Yamuna Link (SYL) water canal unconstitutional. Chairman Punjab Health Systems Corporation 2021-2022, Chief media incharge bjp Punjab present, Aug 2026 Vice president bjp Punjab
