= Nirmal Singh Kahlon =

Indian politician (1942/1943 – 2022)

Speaker of the Punjab Legislative Assembly
- In office 2007–2012
- Chief Minister: Parkash Singh Badal
- Preceded by: Kewal Krishan
- Succeeded by: Charanjit Singh Atwal
- Constituency: Fatehgarh Churian

Member of the Punjab Legislative Assembly
- In office 2007–2012
- Preceded by: Sukhjinder Singh Randhawa
- Succeeded by: Tripat Rajinder Singh Bajwa
- Constituency: Fatehgarh Churian
- In office 1997–2002
- Preceded by: Lakhmir Singh
- Succeeded by: Sukhjinder Singh Randhawa
- Constituency: Fatehgarh Churian

Minister of Rural Development and Panchayats State of Punjab
- In office 1997–2002

Personal details
- Born: 1942/1943
- Died: 16 July 2022 (aged 79) Amritsar, Punjab, India
- Party: Shiromani Akali Dal
- Occupation: Politician

Nirmal Singh Kahlon (1942/1943 – 16 July 2022) was an Indian politician and member of Shiromani Akali Dal. He was the speaker of the Punjab Legislative Assembly.

== Posts held in the State of Punjab ==
- Minister of Rural Development and Panchayats State of Punjab from 1997 to 2002.
- Speaker of the Punjab Legislative Assembly from 2007 to 2012.

== Controversies ==
Kahlon was charged in a recruitment scam case but was later acquitted by the courts.

== Personal life ==
Kahlon was married to Surinder Kaur Kahlon. She died in 2015. He died in Amritsar on 16 July 2022 at the age of 79.
