= Lakhbir Singh Lodhinangal =

Indian politician (b. 1950)

Member of Punjab Legislative Assembly
- In office 2017–2022
- Preceded by: Ashwani Sekhri
- Succeeded by: Amansher Singh
- Constituency: Batala
- In office 2007–2012
- Preceded by: Tripat Rajinder Singh Bajwa
- Succeeded by: Charanjit Kaur Bajwa
- Constituency: Qadian

Personal details
- Born: 7 October 1950 (age 75) Village Lodhinangal, Batala, Punjab, India
- Party: Shiromani Akali Dal

Lakhbir Singh Lodhinangal is an Indian politician who was the member of Punjab Legislative Assembly for two terms between 2007–2012 and 2017–2022. He is a member of the Shiromani Akali Dal.

== Political career ==
He served as Sarpanch of his village for 30 years. Then for first time he was elected from Qadian in 2007 and then he contested from Batala in 2012 but lost to Ashwani Sekhri, then again contested from Batala in 2017 and won. He is the first Akali MLA from Batala.
