= Gurdeep Singh Randhawa =

Indian politician

Member of Punjab Legislative Assembly
- Incumbent
- Assumed office 2024
- Preceded by: Sukhjinder Singh Randhawa
- Constituency: Dera Baba Nanak

Personal details
- Party: Aam Aadmi Party
- Profession: Politician

Gurdeep Singh Randhawa is an Indian politician from Punjab. He is a member of the Punjab Legislative Assembly since 2024, representing Dera Baba Nanak Assembly constituency as a member of the Aam Aadmi Party.

== Assets and liabilities declared during elections ==
During the 2022 Punjab Legislative Assembly election, he declared Rs. 4,03,55,000 as an overall financial asset and Rs. 80,54,847 as financial liability.
