= Aruna Chaudhary =

Indian politician

MLA, Punjab
- Incumbent
- Assumed office 2012
- Preceded by: Sita Ram Kashyap
- Constituency: Dina Nagar
- In office 2002–2007
- Preceded by: Roop Rani
- Succeeded by: Sita Ram Kashyap
- Constituency: Dina Nagar

Deputy Leader of the Opposition of Punjab Legislative Assembly
- Incumbent
- Assumed office 3 September 2024
- Leader: Partap Singh Bajwa
- Preceded by: Raj Kumar Chabbewal

Personal details
- Born: 16 April 1957 (age 69) Amritsar, Punjab
- Party: Indian National Congress

Aruna Chaudhary is an Indian politician and a member of Indian National Congress. Aruna Chaudhary is a senior leader of Punjab Congress. She is member of 15th Punjab Legislative Assembly (MLA) and represents Dina Nagar constituency.

== Political career ==
Chaudhary was elected to the Punjab Legislative Assembly in 2002 from Dina Nagar. In 2012, she was re-elected from Dina Nagar. She was one of the 42 INC MLAs who submitted their resignation in protest of a decision of the Supreme Court of India ruling Punjab's termination of the Sutlej-Yamuna Link (SYL) water canal unconstitutional.

In addition to this, she is General Secretary, Punjab Pradesh Congress Committee and Member, AICC. Aruna has contested 4 elections in a row on the INC ticket and won 3 of these elections in 2002, 2012, and 2017. In the last elections held in 2017, she secured more than 72000 votes and won with a margin of 31917 votes (highest amongst women and 6th highest in-state) by defeating B.D. Dhupal of BJP. She is most senior amongst only 3 women legislators of the ruling Congress party and is inducted in the council of ministers as a Minister of State. She is now in charge of the Revenue and disaster management departments of Punjab. She was Chairperson of Punjab Civil Supplies department from 2004 to 2007. On 2 September 2024, she was appointed Deputy leader of the Congress Legislative Party in Punjab Legislative Assembly after the defection of Raj Kumar Chabbewal from Congress to Aam Aadmi Party.

== Development projects ==
Aruna has been actively participating in development in and around the constituency and instrumental in construction of 85 km new link roads and repair of all existing roads while serving the tenure as MLA from the constituency that is situated on Indo-Pak international Border. Spearheaded the approvals and getting construction completed for five road culverts and two pontoon bridges, providing piped potable water supply to almost all the villages, construction of Dharamshalas, construction of internal streets, drains in villages and community centre etc.

== Social involvement ==
Got the cases of pension and other admissible benefits to eligible senior citizens, widows and orphans sanctioned from Social Security/Welfare departments.

== Assets and liabilities declared during elections ==
During the 2022 Punjab Legislative Assembly election, she declared Rs. 7,79,67,790 as an overall financial asset and Rs. nil as financial liability.

== Electoral performance ==
Punjab Assembly election, 2007: Dina Nagar
Party	Candidate	Votes	%	±%
BJP	Sita Ram	49,173	48.14	▲3.60
INC	Aruna Chaudhary	48,331	47.32	▼0.73
Majority		842	0.82	
Turnout		102,126	74.06	▲8.96
BJP gain from INC		Swing		

Punjab Assembly election, 2012: Dina Nagar
Party	Candidate	Votes	%	±%
INC	Aruna Chaudhary	65,993	52.91	▲5.59
BJP	Bishan Dass	53,066	42.55	▼5.59
Majority		12,927	10.36	
Turnout		124,717	74.06	▲1.51
INC gain from BJP		Swing		

Punjab Assembly election, 2017: Dina Nagar
Party	Candidate	Votes	%	±%
INC	Aruna Chaudhary	72,176	55.82	▲2.91
BJP	Bishan Dass	40,259	31.14	▼11.41
AAP	Joginder Singh	10,258	7.93	new
NOTA	None of the above	1,231	0.95	−−
Majority		31,917	24.45	
Turnout		130,525	71.80	▼2.26
Registered electors		181,776		
INC hold		Swing		

Punjab Assembly election, 2022: Dina Nagar
Party	Candidate	Votes	%	±%
INC	Aruna Chaudhary	51,133	36.60	▼19.22
AAP	Shamsher Singh	50,002	35.79	▲27.86
BJP	Renu Kashyap	20,560	14.72	▼16.42
BSP	Kamaljeet Chawla	15,534	11.12	▲10.67
Independent	Kulwant Singh	1,584	1.11	▼3.94
NOTA	None of the above	931	0.67	▼0.28
Majority		1,131	0.80	
Turnout		139,708		
Registered electors		192,562		
INC hold		Swing		
