= Sucha Singh Langah =

Indian politician

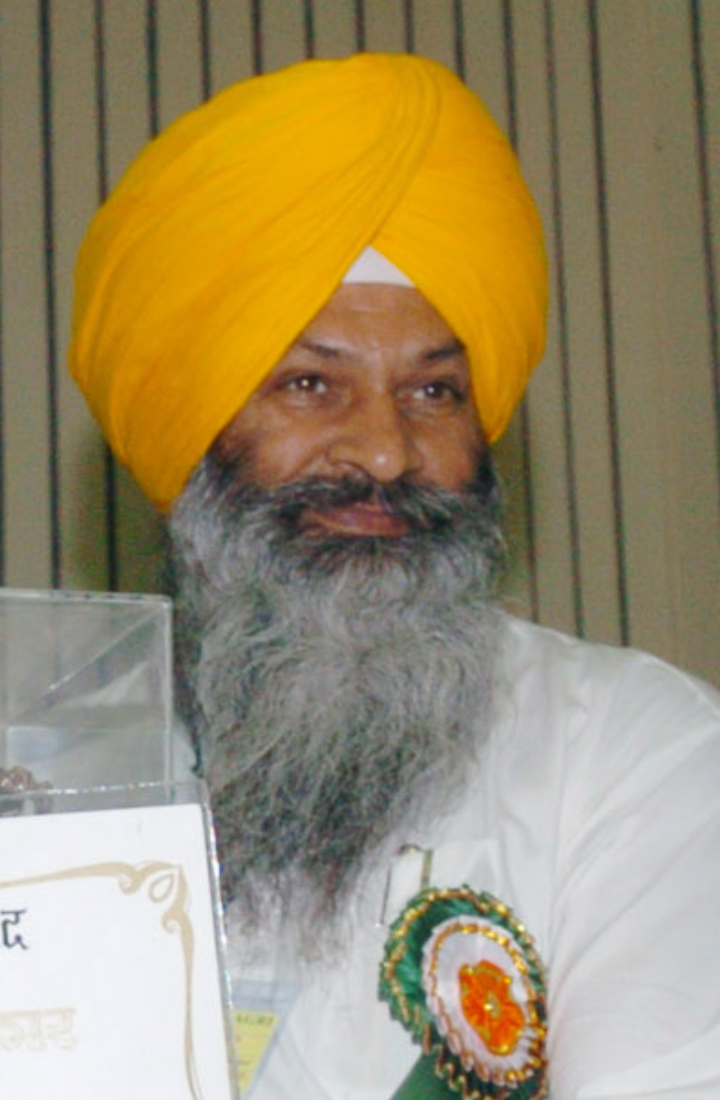

MLA, Punjab
- In office 1997 - 2002
- Preceded by: Sushil Mahajan
- Succeeded by: Sucha Singh Chhotepur
- Constituency: Dhariwal
- In office 2007 - 2007
- Preceded by: Sucha Singh Chhotepur
- Succeeded by: Constituency underwent Boundary delimitation
- Constituency: Dera Baba Nanak

Minister for Public Works Department
- In office 1997 - 2002
- Chief Minister: Parkash Singh Badal
- Succeeded by: Partap Singh Bajwa

Minister for Agriculture
- In office 2007 - 2012
- Chief Minister: Parkash Singh Badal
- Preceded by: Capt. Amarinder Singh
- Succeeded by: Tota Singh

Personal details
- Born: 1966 (age 59–60) village -langah, distt gurdaspur
- Party: Shiromani Akali Dal
- Spouse: 2 spouses. Varinder kaur langah (present )
- Children: 2 sons
- Website: http://www.suchasinghlangah.in/

Sucha Singh Langah is an Indian politician and belongs to the Shiromani Akali Dal. He is a former cabinet Minister in Punjab Government. He was Minister for Public Works Department from 1997 to 2002 and then Minister for Agriculture from 2007 to 2012.

== Family and Education ==
His father's name is Tara Singh. He has studied up to matriculation. His wife name is Narinder kaur Langah and he has 2 sons and 2 daughters from wife narinder kaur

== Political career ==
He was elected to the Punjab Legislative Assembly in 1997 on an Akali Dal ticket from Dhariwal. He was made a cabinet Minister for Public Works Department during 1997-2002. In 2007 he was re-elected from Dhariwal In 2007, he was made again a cabinet minister and given portfolio of Agriculture. In 2012, he unsuccessfully contested from newly formed constituency Dera Baba Nanak. His video with a girl went viral on social media and a case was lodged against him. He was later granted bail.

== Corruption and Rape charges ==
=== Disproportionate Assets Case ===
In 2002, the Vigilance Bureau registered an FIR against Sucha Singh Langah alleging assets worth ₹12–13 crore disproportionate to known income. Then in February 2015, a Special Mohali Court convicted Langah, sentencing him to 3 years imprisonment and imposing a ₹1 crore fine. His associate Amrik Singh Mohali also received the same sentence, and eight co-accused were acquitted.

=== Rape, Extortion & Religious Sentiment Charges (2017–2018) ===
In 2017, Langah faced serious allegations of rape, extortion, cheating, and criminal intimidation. A woman constable from the Punjab Police accused him of repeatedly raping her since 2009, claiming that he had exploited her under the pretext of providing employment and had also recorded a compromising video of the incident.

The FIR was later expanded to include Section 295A for allegedly hurting Sikh religious sentiments.
