= Amansher Singh =

Indian politician

Amansher Singh Shery Kalsi

MLA, Punjab
- Incumbent
- Assumed office 2022
- Preceded by: Lakhbir Singh Lodhinangal
- Constituency: Batala

Co-convener of AAP, Punjab
- Incumbent
- Assumed office 22 November 2024
- Leader: Aman Arora
- Preceded by: Aman Arora

Personal details
- Born: Amansher Singh Kalsi; 8 October 1987 (age 38) Batala
- Party: Aam Aadmi Party
- Education: 12th pass
- Nickname: Sherry Kalsi

Amansher Singh (Shery Kalsi) is an Indian politician and MLA from Batala Assembly constituency. He is a member of the Aam Aadmi Party.

== Member of Legislative Assembly ==
He represents the Batala Assembly constituency as MLA in Punjab Assembly. The Aam Aadmi Party gained a strong 79% majority in the sixteenth Punjab Legislative Assembly by winning 92 out of 117 seats in the 2022 Punjab Legislative Assembly election. MP Bhagwant Mann was sworn in as Chief Minister on 16 March 2022.

Committee assignments of Punjab Legislative Assembly

- Member (2022–23) Committee on Estimates
- Member (2022–23) Committee on Petitions

== Assets and liabilities declared during elections ==
During the 2022 Punjab Legislative Assembly election, he declared Rs. 3,89,94,784 as an overall financial asset and Rs. 11,61,530 as financial liability.

== Electoral performance ==
2024 Indian general election: Gurdaspur
Party	Candidate	Votes	%	±%
INC	Sukhjinder Singh Randhawa	364,043	33.78	▼9.36
BJP	Dinesh Singh	281,182	26.09	▼24.52
AAP	Amansher Singh	277,252	25.72	▲23.21
SAD	Daljit Singh Cheema	85,500	7.93	New
SAD(A)	Gurinder Singh Bajwa	25,765	2.39	New
NOTA	None of the Above	3,354	0.31	▼0.56
Majority		82,861	7.69	▼0.22
Turnout		1,077,826		
Registered electors		16,05,204		
INC gain from BJP		Swing		

State Legislative Assembly
Preceded by Lakhbir Singh Lodhinangal (SAD)	Member of the Punjab Legislative Assembly from Batala Assembly constituency 2022 –	Incumbent
