= Sucha Singh Chhotepur =

Indian politician

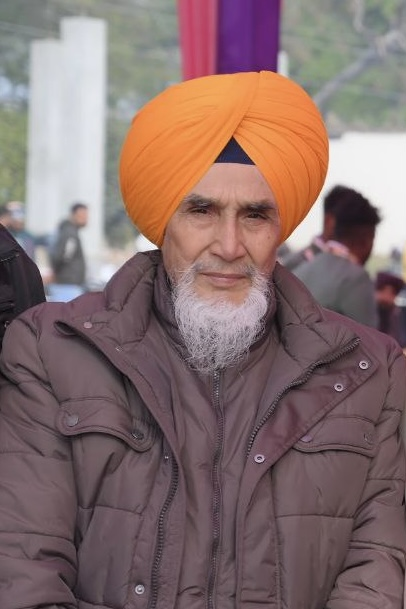

Member of Punjab Legislative Assembly
- In office 1985–1990
- Preceded by: Raj Kumar
- Succeeded by: Sunil Mahajan
- Constituency: Dhariwal
- In office 2002–2007
- Preceded by: Sucha Singh Langah
- Succeeded by: Sucha Singh Langah
- Constituency: Dhariwal

Convener of Aam Aadmi Party, Punjab
- In office 29 August 2014 – 26 August 2016
- Preceded by: Post Established
- Succeeded by: Gurpreet Singh Waraich

Personal details
- Born: 6 August 1953 (age 72) Dhariwal, Punjab
- Party: Shiromani Akali Dal (Punar Surjit)
- Other political affiliations: Shiromani Akali Dal
- Spouse: Harbhajan Kaur
- Parent: Sardar Sardul Singh

Sucha Singh Chhotepur is an Indian politician of Shiromani Akali Dal (Punar Surjit). He was born in Punjab. He was former state convener of the Aam Aadmi Party (AAP) for Punjab. He is the former state Minister of Tourism and a former independent member of the Punjab Legislative Assembly.

== Political career ==
Chhotepur is son in law of Shiromani Akali Dal President Mohan Singh Tur. He was elected sarpanch of Chhotepur village in Majha region of Punjab in 1975.

In 1985, he won Dhariwal constituency in Gurdaspur district and became minister for health and tourism in Surjit Singh Barnala government.(Saka bhra) He resigned from government in a protest against the government actions at the Golden Temple.

He again contested as an independent candidate in 1997 state election from Dhariwal constituency.

He contested 2002 state election from Dhariwal constituency and won the seat as an Independent by margin of 80 votes against Sucha Singh Langah.

In 2009, Chhotepur joined the Indian National Congress in presence of Captain Amarinder Singh in Gurdaspur. He helped Partap Singh Bajwa to defeat Vinod Khanna of Bharatiya Janta Party by 8,342 votes.

In 2012 state election, Chhotepur again contested as Independent lost to Charanjit Kaur Bajwa a wife of Partap Singh Bajwa and came third but got 17000 votes.

In 2014 elections, he became Arvind Kejriwal's go to man in Punjab. He became the AAP convener for Punjab.

In 2017, Chhotepur launched Aapna Punjab Party which led to losses for the Aap in Punjab and stuck it to 20 seats. On 9 December 2021, he joined Shiromani Akali Dal just before 2022 Punjab Legislative Assembly election and will contest from Batala.

In 2022 Punjab Legislative Assembly election he contested from Batala Assembly constituency but lost the election to Amansher Singh of Aam Aadmi Party.

== Aapna Punjab Party ==
Aapna Punjab Party
- Founder: Sucha Singh Chhotepur
- Founded: 1 October 2017
- Dissolved: 16 January 2022
- Split from: Aam Admi Party
- Merged into: akalidal
- Ideology: Regionalist
- ECI Status: State Party

Aapna Punjab Party (APP) was a political party in India, established in 2016 by Chhotepur

Party contested on 78 seats in 2017 Punjab Legislative Assembly election however all candidates forfeited their deposit. It got only 37,475 votes and overall 0.24% voteshare.

On 9 December 2021, with the joining of Akali dal by party president Sucha Singh Chhotepur, party officially merged into Sanyukt Samaj Morcha on 16 January 2022.

== See also ==
- 2017 Punjab Legislative Assembly election
