= Tripat Rajinder Singh Bajwa =

Indian politician

Member of the Punjab Legislative Assembly
- Incumbent
- Assumed office 2012
- Preceded by: Nirmal Singh Kahlon
- Constituency: Fatehgarh Churian
- In office 2002–2007
- Preceded by: Natha Singh Dalam
- Succeeded by: Lakhbir Singh Lodhinangal
- Constituency: Qadian
- In office 1992–1997
- Preceded by: Kalwant Singh
- Succeeded by: Natha Singh Dalam
- Constituency: Qadian

Minister for Rural Development and Panchayats, Punjab

Minister for Water Supply and Sanitation, Now Animal Husbandry Punjab

Personal details
- Born: 23 February 1943 (age 83) Kotli Bajwa, Narowal, Sialkot District, Punjab Province, British India (present-day Narowal District, Pakistan)
- Party: Indian National Congress
- Spouse: Rattneshwar Kaur
- Children: Ravinandan Singh Bajwa and Harinandan singh bajwa
- Parents: Gurbachan Singh Bajwa (father); Beant Kaur (mother)

Tripat Rajinder Singh Bajwa is an Indian politician and a member of Indian National Congress. He is a Member of Punjab Legislative Assembly (MLA) and represents Fatehgarh Churian. He heads the Ministries of Rural Development Now Animal Husbandry Panchayats and Water Supply & Sanitation for the Government of Punjab.

== Early life ==
Bajwa was born on 23 February 1943 to parents Gurbachan Singh Bajwa and Beant Kaur in Pakistan in Kotli Bajwa, Narowal, Sialkot.

Gurbachan Singh Bajwa was a cabinet minister in Gopi Chand Bhargava, Bhim Sen Sachar and Sardar Partap Singh Kairon Cabinets and held portfolios such as PWD, Education and Chandigarh capital project.

== Assets and liabilities declared during elections ==
During the 2022 Punjab Legislative Assembly election, he declared Rs. 6,89,12,196 as an overall financial asset and Rs. 2,74,04,995 as financial liability.

== Political career ==
Tripat Rajinder Singh Bajwa started his career from grass root level, became general secretary of Youth Congress, he was elected as Qadian Municipal council member, then became president of Qadian municipality and Chairman of local Market Committee. Tripat Bajwa first fought election in 1977 from Qadian, 1980 from Sri Hargobindpur. Bajwa first successfully contested Punjab Legislative Assembly from Qadian in 1992 and won again in 2002. In March 2003, he was made Minister of Forest. However, he had to resign in August 2004 due to cabinet rejig. Tripat Rajinder Singh like his father is known to be honest upright politician and die hard Congress leader. Later, he was appointed chairman of Punjab Pollution Control Board. In 2012, he was elected from Fatehgarh Churian. He was one of the 42 INC MLAs who submitted their resignation in protest of a decision of the Supreme Court of India ruling Punjab's termination of the Sutlej-Yamuna Link (SYL) water canal unconstitutional. Tripat Rajinder Singh Bajwa was reelected from Fatehgarh Churian in 2017 and was inducted as Cabinet Minister in Capt. Amarinder Singh ministry with portfolio of Rural development and panchayats, water supply & sanitation minister.
