= 2017 Punjab Legislative Assembly election =

- 4 February 2017

All 117 seats in the Punjab Legislative Assembly 59 seats needed for a majority
- Opinion polls
- Registered: 20,029,646
- Turnout: 77.20% (▼1.10%)
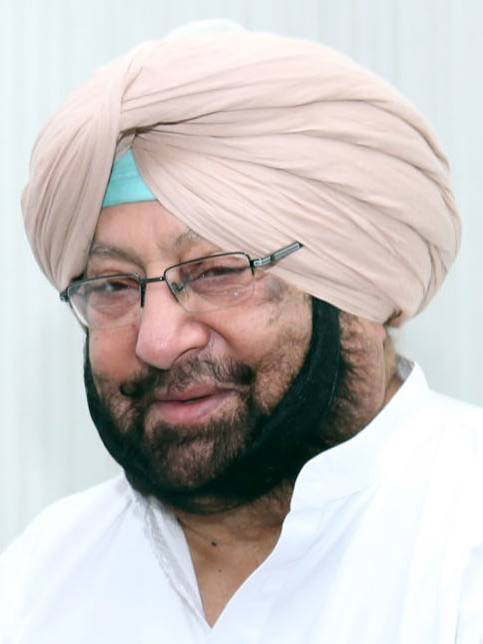

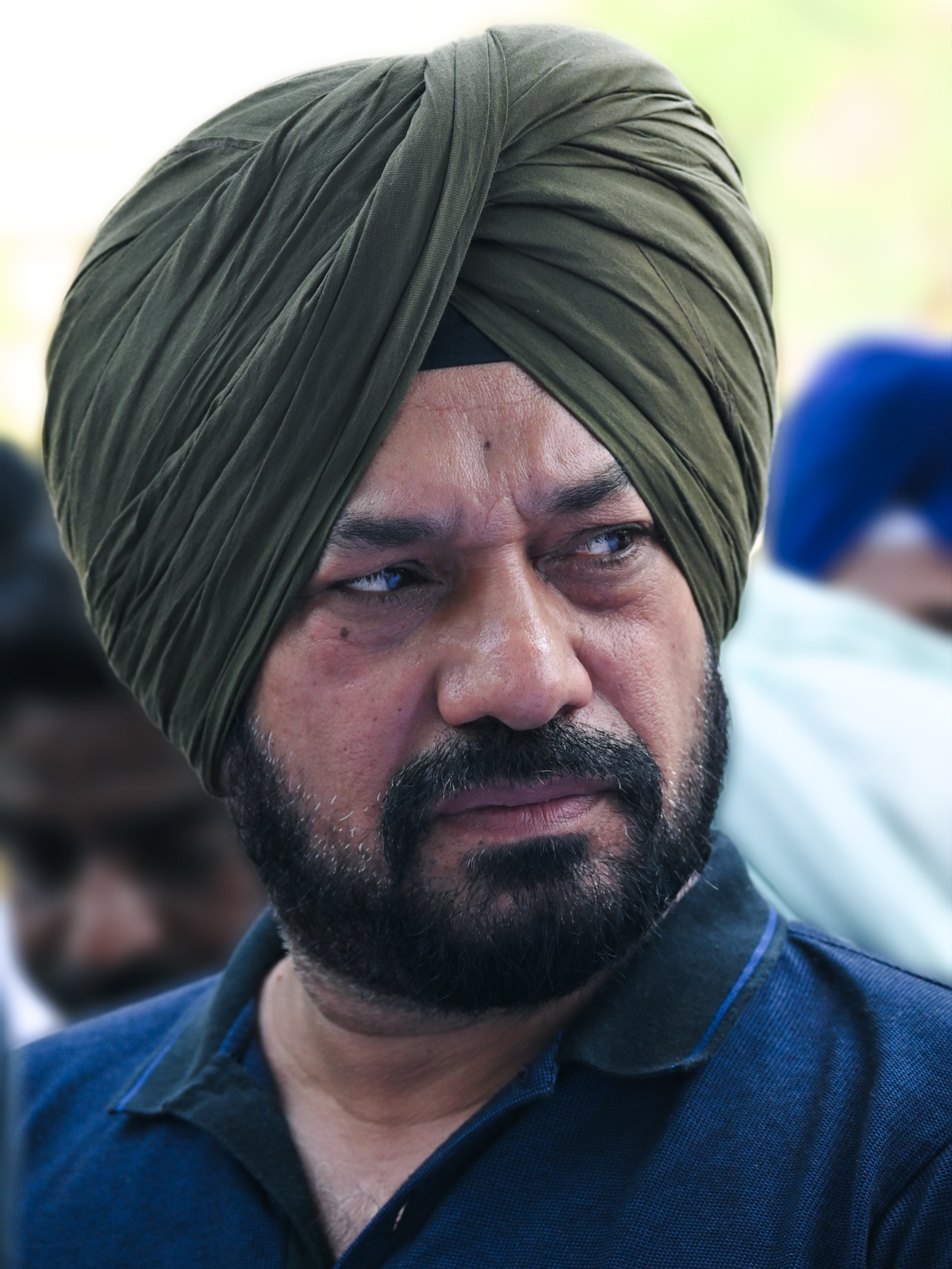

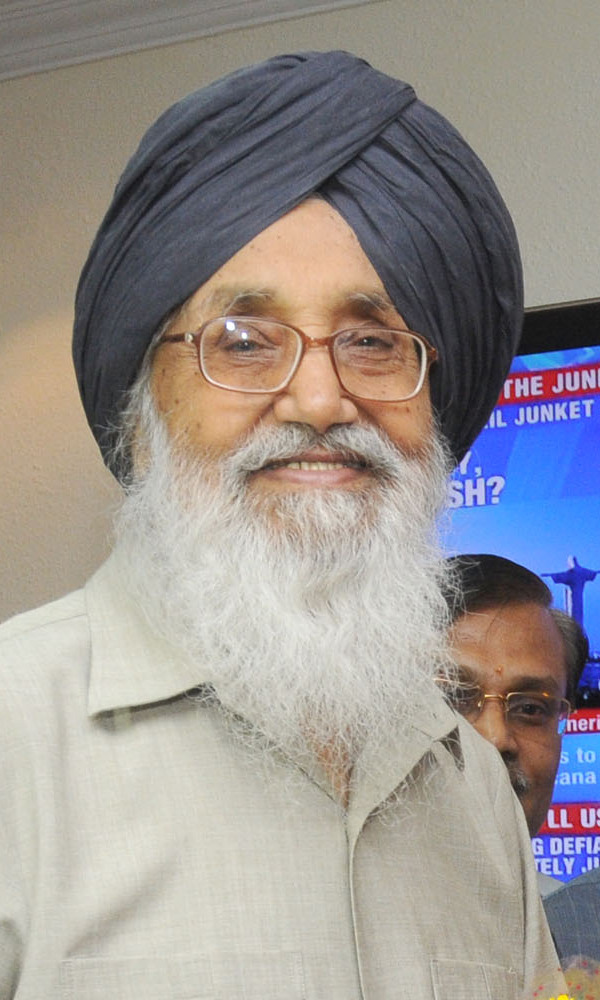
	Majority party	Minority party	Third party
Leader	Amarinder Singh	Gurpreet Singh Waraich	Parkash Singh Badal
Party	INC	AAP	SAD
Alliance	UPA	AAP + LIP	NDA
Leader since	2015	2016	1994
Leader's seat	Patiala (won); Lambi (lost)	Batala (lost)	Lambi (Won)
Last election	30.09%, 46 seats	New	34.73, 56 seats
Seats won	77	20	15
Seat change	▲31	New	▼41
Popular vote	5,945,899	3,662,665	3,898,161
Percentage	38.77%	23.88%	25.42%
Swing	▼1.47%	New	▼9.49 pp

- Structure of the Punjab Legislative Assembly after the election
Chief Minister before election
Prakash Singh Badal
SAD
Elected Chief Minister
Amarinder Singh
Charanjit Singh Channi
INC

A Legislative Assembly election was held in the Indian state of Punjab on 4 February 2017 to elect the 117 members of the Fifteenth Punjab Legislative Assembly. The counting of votes was done on 11 March 2017. The ruling pre-election coalition was the alliance comprising the political parties Shiromani Akali Dal and Bharatiya Janata Party and led by Chief Minister Parkash Singh Badal. The voter turnout for the Punjab Assembly election was 77.2% The Indian National Congress led by former Chief Minister Captain Amarinder Singh defeated the ruling alliance and the newcomer Aam Aadmi Party.

== Background ==
=== Electoral process changes ===
In April 2016, the Election Commission of India revealed about 8 lakh bogus votes of state being cancelled in the past one year and over 7 lakh youngsters who have attained the age of 18 this year were yet to get registered. One constituency in every district will be chosen for trial run of Voter-verified paper audit trail (VVPAT) machines used along with EVMs. Election Commission also decided to set up new polling stations if the number of voters was more than 1200 in rural areas and 1400 in urban areas.

33 constituencies of all district headquarters in Punjab had VVPAT machines installed with EVMs, including 22 district headquarters besides 11 high-profile constituencies.

Assembly constituencies of Punjab having VVPAT facility with EVMs
Lambi	Jalalabad	Majitha	Patiala
Atam Nagar	Chabbewal	Guruharsahai	Ferozpur
Barnala	Sanour	Lehragaga	Jalandhar (central)
Bathinda (urban)	Raikot	Moga	Anandpur Sahib
Bholath	Qadian	Chabbewal	Rampura Phul

As per the special summary revision of electoral rolls, there are a total of 1.9 crore voters in Punjab as of August 2016.

Final voters list for Punjab Legislative Assembly election 2017
S.No	Group of voters	Voters population
1	Male	1.05 crore
2	Female	94 lakhs
Total Voters		1.9 crore

=== Political developments ===
The 2014 general election was held in Punjab for 13 parliamentary constituencies. Shiromani Akali Dal and Aam Aadmi Party won 4 seats each, Congress won 3 while 2 constituencies elected Bharatiya Janata Party candidates. The first-time contesting Aam Aadmi Party won from 34 of the total 117 assembly segments, coming second in 7, third in 73 and fourth in the rest 3 segments. Wherever it trailed the major parties, its vote share was mostly bigger than the margin of victory of the winning candidate, turning forthcoming elections into three-cornered contests.

Shiromani Akali Dal-Bharatiya Janata Party

The previous election, held in 2012, resulted in a majority of seats being won by ruling Shiromani Akali Dal-Bharatiya Janata Party and Parkash Singh Badal became Chief Minister of Punjab.

Aam Aadmi Party

In December 2015, Aam Aadmi Party declared that it would contest the Legislative Assembly elections in 2017. AAP which did not participate in the previous assembly election, had fought 2014 Lok Sabha elections. Their 2014 performance translates to 33 assembly seats out of 117. In the election, the party formed a coalition with the Lok Insaaf Party and gave it five seats. No CM candidate was declared before the elections. According to AAP national convener Arvind Kejriwal, the CM candidate would be selected from Punjab. AAP won 20 seats in the Punjab Assembly in its debut in the 2017 Punjab elections. The performance of AAP was below expectations and 25 candidates of the party lost their deposit amounts.

Indian National Congress

The Congress took part in the elections under the leadership of Amarinder Singh, and the party hired poll strategist Prashant Kishor for campaigning.

Bahujan Samaj Party

BSP is the fourth largest party in Punjab after improving its vote share in 2012 elections started preparations for 2017 early by launching Punjab Bachao Abhiyaan from 1 November 2014. In 2012, the BSP came second from Balachaur Vidhan Sabha seat with 21,943 votes. On 15 March 2016, Mayawati during a mega-rally in Nawanshahr on the birth anniversary of BSP founder Kanshi Ram in Punjab attacked SAD-BJP government as "anti-Dalit" and Arvind Kejriwal as a "baniya" who had "always worked against Dalit and Scheduled Caste people" before he became Delhi CM. Mayawati also declared that the BSP will contest Punjab 2017 elections on its own in all 117 seats. The BSP declared that it will root out the drug menace from the state within a month of coming to power in Punjab. On 9 June 2016, BSP national president Mayawati supported the film on Punjab drug abuse Udta Punjab, saying there is 'nothing wrong' in it. In May 2016, the BSP launched the Pind Pind Chalo, Ghar Ghar Chalo campaign, a door-to-door drive to cover 29 million people across 550,000 households with Punjab Bachao, BSP laao (Save Punjab, elect BSP) as its main slogan as well as the overall theme of the campaign. The BSP formed 65 teams for around 15,000 big and small rallies as well as seminars to be conducted in the state. The party also announced a 10% reservation for the poor upper castes if the BSP government comes to power in Punjab. BSP Punjab unit started social media campaigning and also visited NRIs for support in Vienna, Europe and North America. On 16 May 2016, the Ambedkar Sena Punjab merged with BSP. Gurmel Chander, former president of the SC & BC teachers employees union, joined the BSP on 25 August. On 25 September 2016, the BSP announced a list of nine candidates for 2017 Punjab assembly elections. On 25 September 2016, Avtar Singh Karimpuri was replaced with Rashpal Singh Raju as BSP Punjab state president as the former was declared a Vidhan Sabha candidate from Phillaur. Karimpuri's entry in Phillaur constituency spiced up the political battle in the seat. Karimpuri said that the Punjab Congress does not want an alliance with the BSP, rather its agenda was to wipe out BSP from Punjab in the 2017 assembly elections. New BSP president Rashpal Raju announced a mega rally in Phagwara on 9 October Parinirvana divas of BSP founder Kanshi Ram. At this rally, Avtar Singh Karimpuri and Dr. Megh Raj attacked Shiromani Akali Dal and Congress as anti-Sikh parties.

=== Election issues ===
First and foremost issue was drug peddling. There were several election issues like unemployment & lack of skills, farmers' crises, continually failing economy, sifarish (patronage & influence peddling & nepotism), unbridled crime and the role of goons in day-to-day matters of the citizen, road rage & accidents. Atrocities against Dalits and Dalit land issues in Sangrur area, the 1984 anti-Sikh riots and the supply of drugs & addiction to them. Punjabi Non-resident Indians (NRIs) play a major role in elections.

=== Caste and religion data ===
As per the 2011 census, 57.69% of the state's population follows Sikhism, making Punjab the only Sikh majority state in India. Hindus form 38.5% of the population, while Muslims, 1.93%; Christians, 1.3%; Buddhists, 0.12%; and Jains, 0.16%. Dalits (Scheduled Castes) constitute 31.94% of the population, the highest percentage amongst all the states. Other Backward Classes (OBCs) like Sainis, Sunar, Kambojs, Tarkhans/Ramgarhias, Gurjars, Kumhars/Prajapatis, Telis, Banjaras, Lohars constitute 31.3% of the population. Jat-Sikhs comprise 21% of the population while other forward castes (general category) - Brahmins, Khatris/Bhapas, Bania, Thakurs/Rajputs constitute around rest. As of 2016, Government of India did not publicly release Socio Economic and Caste Census 2011 caste population data for every single non-SC/ST castes (General castes, OBC/EBCs) in India.

Population by faith in Punjab, India (2011)
1. Sikh (58.0%)
2. Hindu (38.5%)
3. Muslim (1.90%)
4. Christian (1.30%)
5. Others and non-religious (0.60%)

Caste Population data of Punjab
Constitutional categories	Population (%)	Castes
Other Backward Classes (OBC)	31.3%	includes Sikh Rajputs, Saini (Sainis added to OBC list in 2016), Sunar, Kamboj, Labana, Tarkhan/Ramgarhia, Kumhar/Prajapati, Arain, Gurjar, Teli, Banjara, Lohar, Bhat, Others
Scheduled Castes (Dalits)	31.9%	includes Mazhabi Sikh - 10%, Ramdasia Sikh/Ravidassia (Chamar)/Ad-Dharmi - 13.1%, Balmiki/Bhanghi - 3.5%, Bazigar - 1.05%, Others - 4%
Unreserved (mostly Upper castes)	33%	includes Jat Sikh - 21%, (Brahmin, Rajput, Bania, Khatri-Arora-Sood) - 12%
Others (religious minorities)	3.8%	includes Muslims, Christians, Buddhists, Jains

== Schedule ==
Election Commission of India Announced poll dates on Jan 4, 2017

Event	Date	Day
Date of Notification	11 Jan 2017	Wednesday
Last date for nominations	18 Jan 2017	Wednesday
Scrutiny of nominations	19 Jan 2017	Thursday
Withdrawal of candidature	21 Jan 2017	Saturday
Date of poll	4 Feb 2017	Saturday
Date of counting	11 Mar 2017	Saturday
Date before which the election shall be completed	15 Mar 2017	Wednesday

Counting of vote in assembly elections in Punjab took place on 11 March. The Punjab state witnessed a tough fight between the major four political parties in the assembly election held on 4 February 2017. The term of the current assembly will end on 18 March 2017.

== Districts and constituencies ==
District	Constituency	Region
Pathankot	Sujanpur	Majha
Pathankot	Bhoa	Majha
Pathankot	Pathankot	Majha
Gurdaspur	Gurdaspur	Majha
Gurdaspur	Dina Nagar	Majha
Gurdaspur	Qadian	Majha
Gurdaspur	Batala	Majha
Gurdaspur	Sri Hargobindpur	Majha
Gurdaspur	Fatehgarh Churian	Majha
Gurdaspur	Dera Baba Nanak	Majha
Amritsar	Ajnala	Majha
Amritsar	Raja Sansi	Majha
Amritsar	Majitha	Majha
Amritsar	Jandiala	Majha
Amritsar	Amritsar North	Majha
Amritsar	Amritsar West	Majha
Amritsar	Amritsar Central	Majha
Amritsar	Amritsar East	Majha
Amritsar	Amritsar South	Majha
Amritsar	Attari	Majha
Tarn Taran	Tarn Taran	Majha
Tarn Taran	Khem Karan	Majha
Tarn Taran	Patti	Majha
Tarn Taran	Khadur Sahib	Majha
Amritsar	Baba Bakala	Majha
Kapurthala	Bholath	Doaba
Kapurthala	Kapurthala	Doaba
Kapurthala	Sultanpur Lodhi	Doaba
Kapurthala	Phagwara	Doaba
Jalandhar	Phillaur	Doaba
Jalandhar	Nakodar	Doaba
Jalandhar	Shahkot	Doaba
Jalandhar	Kartarpur	Doaba
Jalandhar	Jalandhar West	Doaba
Jalandhar	Jalandhar Central	Doaba
Jalandhar	Jalandhar North	Doaba
Jalandhar	Jalandhar Cantt	Doaba
Jalandhar	Adampur	Doaba
Hoshiarpur	Mukerian	Doaba
Hoshiarpur	Dasuya	Doaba
Hoshiarpur	Urmar	Doaba
Hoshiarpur	Sham Chaurasi	Doaba
Hoshiarpur	Hoshiarpur	Doaba
Hoshiarpur	Chabbewal	Doaba
Hoshiarpur	Garhshankar	Doaba
Nawanshahr	Banga	Doaba
Nawanshahr	Nawanshahr	Doaba
Nawanshahr	Balachaur	Doaba
Rup Nagar	Anandpur Sahib	Malwa
Rup Nagar	Rup Nagar	Malwa
Rup Nagar	Chamkaur Sahib	Malwa
S.A.S. Nagar	Kharar	Malwa
S.A.S. Nagar	S.A.S. Nagar	Malwa
Fatehgarh Sahib	Bassi Pathana	Malwa
Fatehgarh Sahib	Fatehgarh Sahib	Malwa
Fatehgarh Sahib	Amloh	Malwa
Ludhiana	Khanna	Malwa
Ludhiana	Samrala	Malwa
Ludhiana	Sahnewal	Malwa
Ludhiana	Ludhiana East	Malwa
Ludhiana	Ludhiana South	Malwa
Ludhiana	Atam Nagar	Malwa
Ludhiana	Ludhiana Central	Malwa
Ludhiana	Ludhiana West	Malwa
Ludhiana	Ludhiana North	Malwa
Ludhiana	Gill	Malwa
Ludhiana	Payal	Malwa
Ludhiana	Dakha	Malwa
Ludhiana	Raikot	Malwa
Ludhiana	Jagraon	Malwa
Moga	Nihal Singh Wala	Malwa
Moga	Bagha Purana	Malwa
Moga	Moga	Malwa
Moga	Dharamkot	Malwa
Firozpur	Zira	Malwa
Firozpur	Firozpur City	Malwa
Firozpur	Firozpur Rural	Malwa
Firozpur	Guru Har Sahai	Malwa
Fazilka	Jalalabad	Malwa
Fazilka	Fazilka	Malwa
Fazilka	Abohar	Malwa
Fazilka	Balluana	Malwa
Muktsar	Lambi	Malwa
Muktsar	Gidderbaha	Malwa
Muktsar	Malout	Malwa
Muktsar	Muktsar	Malwa
Faridkot	Faridkot	Malwa
Faridkot	Kot Kapura	Malwa
Faridkot	Jaito	Malwa
Bathinda	Rampura Phul	Malwa
Bathinda	Bhucho Mandi	Malwa
Bathinda	Bathinda	Malwa
Bathinda	Bathinda Rural	Malwa
Bathinda	Talwandi Sabo	Malwa
Bathinda	Maur	Malwa
Mansa	Mansa	Malwa
Mansa	Sardulgarh	Malwa
Mansa	Budhlada	Malwa
Sangrur	Lehra	Malwa
Sangrur	Dirba	Malwa
Sangrur	Sunam	Malwa
Barnala	Bhadaur	Malwa
Barnala	Barnala	Malwa
Barnala	Mehal Kalan	Malwa
Sangrur	Malerkotla	Malwa
Sangrur	Amargarh	Malwa
Sangrur	Dhuri	Malwa
Sangrur	Sangrur	Malwa
Patiala	Nabha	Malwa
Patiala	Patiala Rural	Malwa
Patiala	Rajpura	Malwa
S.A.S. Nagar	Dera Bassi	Malwa
Patiala	Ghanaur	Malwa
Patiala	Sanaur	Malwa
Patiala	Patiala	Malwa
Patiala	Samana	Malwa
Patiala	Shutrana	Malwa

== Parties and Alliances ==
=== United Progressive Alliance ===
United Progressive Alliance
Party	Flag	Symbol	Leader	Seats
Indian National Congress			Captain Amarinder Singh	117
Total				117

=== Aam Aadmi Party+ ===
Aam Aadmi Party-led Alliance
Party	Flag	Symbol	Leader	Seats
Aam Aadmi Party			Gurpreet Singh Waraich	112
Lok Insaaf Party			Simarjit Singh Bains	5
Total				117

=== National Democratic Alliance ===
2017 NDA Seat Sharing Map Punjab

National Democratic Alliance
Party	Flag	Symbol	Leader	Seats
Shiromani Akali Dal			Sukhbir Singh Badal	94
Bharatiya Janata Party			Vijay Sampla	23
Total				117

=== Others ===
Other Parties
Party	Flag	Symbol	Leader	Seats
Bahujan Samaj Party			Jasvir Singh Garhi	111
Aapna Punjab Party			Sucha Singh Chhotepur	77
Shiromani Akali Dal (Amritsar)			Simranjit Singh Mann	54
Communist Party of India			Bant Singh Brar	23
All India Trinamool Congress				20
Revolutionary Marxist Party of India			Mangat Ram Pasla	13

== List of Candidates ==
Constituency		INC		AAP+		NDA	
No.	Name	Party	Candidate	Party	Candidate	Party	Candidate
1	Sujanpur	INC	Nazim Saifi	AAP	Shariq Ali	BJP	Kumar bhagwant
2	Bhoa	INC	Mohd Saud	AAP	Mohd Asif	BJP	Mohd Shad
3	Pathankot	INC	Amit Vij	AAP	Raj Kumar	BJP	Ashwani Kumar Sharma
4	Gurdaspur	INC	Barindermeet Singh Pahra	AAP	Amarjit Singh Chahal	SAD	Gurbachan Singh Babbehali
5	Dina Nagar	INC	Aruna Chaudhary	AAP	Joginder Singh	BJP	Bishan Dass
6	Qadian	INC	Fatehjang Singh Bajwa	AAP	Kanwal Preet Singh	SAD	Sewa Singh Sekhwan
7	Batala	INC	Ashwani Sekhri	AAP	Gurpreet Ghuggi	SAD	Lakhbir Singh Lodhinangal
8	Sri Hargobindpur	INC	Balwinder Singh	AAP	Amarpal Singh	SAD	Manjit Singh
9	Fatehgarh Churian	INC	Tripat Rajinder Singh Bajwa	AAP	Gurvinder Singh Shampura	SAD	Nirmal Singh Kahlon
10	Dera Baba Nanak	INC	Sukhjinder Singh Randhawa	AAP	Gurpartap Singh Khushalpur	SAD	Sucha Singh Langah
11	Ajnala	INC	Harpartap Singh	AAP	Rajpreet Singh	SAD	Amarpal Singh Ajnala
12	Raja Sansi	INC	Sukhbinder Singh Sarkaria	AAP	Jagjot Singh Dhillon	SAD	Vir Singh Lopoke
13	Majitha	INC	Sukhjinder Raj Singh (Lalli)	AAP	Himmat Singh Shergill	SAD	Bikram Singh Majithia
14	Jandiala	INC	Sukhwinder Singh Danny Bandala	AAP	Harbhajan Singh ETO	SAD	Dalbir Singh
15	Amritsar North	INC	Sunil Dutti	AAP	Manish Aggarwal	BJP	Anil Joshi
16	Amritsar West	INC	Raj Kumar Verka	AAP	Balwinder Singh Sahota	BJP	Rakesh Gill
17	Amritsar Central	INC	Om Parkash Soni	AAP	Ajay Gupta	BJP	Tarun Chugh
18	Amritsar East	INC	Navjot Singh Sidhu	AAP	Sarabjot Singh Dhanjal	BJP	Rajesh Kumar Honey
19	Amritsar South	INC	Inderbir Singh Bolaria	AAP	Inderbir Singh Nijjar	SAD	Gurpartap Singh Tikka
20	Attari	INC	D. C. Tarsem Singh	AAP	Jaswinder Singh Jahangir	SAD	Gulzar Singh Ranike
21	Tarn Taran	INC	Dharambir Agnihotri	AAP	Kartar Singh Pehalwan	SAD	Harmeet Singh Sandhu
22	Khem Karan	INC	Sukhpal Singh Bhullar	AAP	Bikramajit Singh	SAD	Virsa Singh
23	Patti	INC	Harminder Singh Gill	AAP	Ranjit Singh Cheema	SAD	Adesh Partap Singh Kairon
24	Khadoor Sahib	INC	Ramanjit Singh Sikki	AAP	Bhupinder Singh	SAD	Ravinder Singh Brahmpura
25	Baba Bakala	INC	Santokh Singh	AAP	Dalbir Singh Tong	SAD	Malkiat Singh
26	Bholath	INC	Ranjit Singh Rana	AAP	Sukhpal Singh Khaira	SAD	Yuvraj Bhupinder Singh
27	Kapurthala	INC	Rana Gurjeet Singh	AAP	Sukhwant Singh Padda	SAD	Advocate Paramjit Singh
28	Sultanpur Lodhi	INC	Navtej Singh Cheema	AAP	Sajjan Singh Cheema	SAD	Upinderjit Kaur
29	Phagwara	INC	Joginder Singh Mann	AAP	Jarnail Nangal	BJP	Som Parkash
30	Phillaur	INC	Vikramjit Singh Chaudhary	AAP	Saroop Singh Kadiana	SAD	Baldev Singh Khaira
31	Nakodar	INC	Jagbir Singh Brar	AAP	Sarwan Singh Hayer	SAD	Gurpratap Singh Wadala
32	Shahkot	INC	Hardev Singh Laddi	AAP	Amarjit Singh Mehatpur	SAD	Ajit Singh Kohar
33	Kartarpur	INC	Chaudhary Surinder Singh	AAP	Chander Kumar Grewal	SAD	Seth Sat Paul
34	Jalandhar West	INC	Sushil Kumar Rinku	AAP	Darshan Lal Bhagat	BJP	Mahinder Pal Bhagat
35	Jalandhar Central	INC	Rajinder Beri	AAP	Dr. Sanjiv Sharma	BJP	Manoranjan Kalia
36	Jalandhar North	INC	Avtar Singh Junior	AAP	Ayush Gaur	BJP	K. D. Bhandari
37	Jalandhar Cantt.	INC	Pargat Singh	AAP	Harkrishan Singh Walia	SAD	Sarabjit Singh Makkar
38	Adampur	INC	Altamash	AAP	Hans Raj Rana	SAD	Pawan Kumar Tinu
39	Mukerian	INC	Rajnish Kumar Babbi	AAP	Sulakhan Singh	BJP	Arunesh Kumar
40	Dasuya	INC	Arun Dogra	AAP	Balbir Kaur	BJP	Sukhjit Kaur
41	Urmar	INC	Sangat Singh Gilzian	AAP	Jasvir Singh Raja Gill	SAD	Arbinder Singh Rasulpur
42	Sham Chaurasi	INC	Pawan Kumar Adia	AAP	Dr. Ravjot Singh	SAD	Mohinder Kaur Josh
43	Hoshiarpur	INC	Sunder Sham Arora	AAP	Paramjit Singh Sachdeva	BJP	Tikshan Sud
44	Chabbewal	INC	Raj Kumar Chabbewal	AAP	Raman Kumar	SAD	Sohan Singh Thandal
45	Garhshankar	INC	Luv Kumar Goldy	AAP	Jai Krishan	SAD	Surinder Singh Heer
46	Banga (SC)	INC	Satnam Singh Kainth	AAP	Harjot	SAD	Sukhwinder Kumar
47	Nawanshahr	INC	Angad Singh	AAP	Charanjit Singh Channi	SAD	Jarnail Singh Wahid
48	Balachaur	INC	Chaudhary Darshan Lal	AAP	Raj Kumar	SAD	Chaudhary Nand Lal
49	Anandpur Sahib	INC	Rana K. P. Singh	AAP	Sanjeev Gautam	BJP	Dr. Parminder Sharma
50	Rupnagar	INC	Brinder Singh Dhillon	AAP	Amarjit Singh Sandoa	SAD	Daljit Singh Cheema
51	Chamkaur Sahib	INC	Charanjit Singh Channi	AAP	Charanjit Singh	SAD	Justice Nirmal Singh
52	Kharar	INC	Jagmohan Singh Kang	AAP	Kanwar Sandhu	SAD	Ranjit Singh Gill
53	S.A.S. Nagar	INC	Balbir Singh Sidhu	AAP	Narinder Singh	SAD	Tejinder Pal Singh
54	Bassi Pathana	INC	Gurpreet Singh	AAP	Santokh Singh	SAD	Darbara Singh Guru
55	Fatehgarh Sahib	INC	Kuljit Singh Nagra	AAP	Lakhvir Singh Rai	SAD	Didar Singh Bhatti
56	Amloh	INC	Randeep Singh	AAP	Gurpreet Singh Bhatti	SAD	Gurpreet Singh Raju Khanna
57	Khanna	INC	Gurkirat Singh Kotli	AAP	Anil Dutt Phally	SAD	Ranjit Singh Talwandi
58	Samrala	INC	Amrik Singh Dhillon	AAP	Sarbans Singh Manki	SAD	Santa Singh Umaidpur
59	Sahnewal	INC	Satwinder Bitti	AAP	Harjot Singh Bains	SAD	Sharanjit Singh Dhillon
60	Ludhiana East	INC	Sanjeev Talwar	AAP	Daljit Singh Grewal	SAD	Ranjit Singh Dhillon
61	Ludhiana South	INC	Bhupinder Singh Sidhu	LIP	Balwinder Singh Bains	SAD	Hira Singh Gabria
62	Atam Nagar	INC	Kamal Jit Singh Karwal	LIP	Simarjit Singh Bains	SAD	Gurmeet Singh Kular
63	Ludhiana Central	INC	Surinder Kumar Dawar	LIP	Vipan Sood Kaka	BJP	Gurdev Sharma Debi
64	Ludhiana West	INC	Bharat Bhushan Ashu	AAP	Ahbaab Singh Grewal	BJP	Kamal Chatly
65	Ludhiana North	INC	Rakesh Pandey	LIP	Randhir Singh Sivia	BJP	Parveen Bansal
66	Gill	INC	Kuldeep Singh Vaid	AAP	Jiwan Singh Sangowal	SAD	Darshan Singh Shivalik
67	Payal	INC	Lakhvir Singh Lakha	AAP	Gurpreet Singh Lapran	SAD	Isher Singh Meharban
68	Dakha	INC	Major Singh Bhaini	AAP	H. S. Phoolka	SAD	Manpreet Singh Ayali
69	Raikot	INC	Amar Singh	AAP	Jagtar Singh Jagga Hissowal	SAD	Inder Iqbal Singh Atwal
70	Jagraon	INC	Malkit Singh Dakha	AAP	Saravjit Kaur Manuke	SAD	Amarjit Kaur Sahoke
71	Nihal Singhwala	INC	Rajwinder Kaur	AAP	Manjit Singh Bilaspur	SAD	S. R. Kaler
72	Bhagha Purana	INC	Darshan Singh Brar	AAP	Gurbinder Singh Kang	SAD	Tirath Singh Mahla
73	Moga	INC	Harjot Kamal Singh	AAP	Ramesh Grover	SAD	Barjinder Singh Makhan Brar
74	Dharamkot	INC	Sukhjit Singh	AAP	Daljit Singh	SAD	Tota Singh
75	Zira	INC	Saud Ansari	AAP	Zara Khan	SAD	Ubaid Niyaz
76	Firozpur City	INC	Parminder Singh Pinki	AAP	Narinder Singh	BJP	Sukhpal Singh
77	Firozpur Rural	INC	Satkar Kaur	AAP	Mohan Singh Phallian Wala	SAD	Joginder Singh Jindu
78	Guru Har Sahai	INC	Rana Gurmit Singh Sodhi	AAP	Malkit Chand	SAD	Vardev Singh
79	Jalalabad	INC	Ravneet Singh Bittu	AAP	Bhagwant Mann	SAD	Sukhbir Singh Badal
80	Fazilka	INC	Davinder Singh Ghubaya	AAP	Samarbir Singh Sidhu	BJP	Surjit Kumar Jyani
81	Abohar	INC	Sunil Kumar Jakhar	AAP	Atul Nagpal	BJP	Arun Narang
82	Balluana	INC	Nathu Ram	AAP	Simarjeet Singh	SAD	Parkash Singh Bhatti
83	Lambi	INC	Capt. Amarinder Singh	AAP	Jarnail Singh	SAD	Parkash Singh Badal
84	Gidderbaha	INC	Amrinder Singh Raja Warring	AAP	Jagdeep Singh	SAD	Hardeep Singh Dhillon
85	Malout	INC	Ajaib Singh Bhatti	AAP	Principal Baldev Singh	SAD	Darshan Singh
86	Muktsar	INC	Karan Kaur	AAP	Jagdeep Singh	SAD	Kanwarjit Singh
87	Faridkot	INC	Kushaldeep Singh Dhillon	AAP	Gurdit Singh Sekhon	SAD	Parambans Singh Bunty Romana
88	Kotkapura	INC	Harnirpal Singh	AAP	Kultar Singh Sandhwan	SAD	Mantar Singh Brar
89	Jaitu	INC	Mohammad Sadique	AAP	Baldev Singh	SAD	Manjit Singh @ Suba Singh
90	Rampura Phul	INC	Gurpreet Singh Kangar	AAP	Manjit Singh Sidhu	SAD	Sikander Singh Maluka
91	Bhucho Mandi	INC	Pritam Singh Kotbhai	AAP	Jagsir Singh	SAD	Harpreet Singh
92	Bathinda Urban	INC	Manpreet Singh Badal	AAP	Deepak Bansal	SAD	Sarup Chand Singla
93	Bathinda Rural	INC	Harvinder Singh Laddi	AAP	Rupinder Kaur Ruby	SAD	Amit Rattan
94	Talwandi Sabo	INC	Khushbaz Singh Jatana	AAP	Prof. Baljinder Kaur	SAD	Jeetmohinder Singh Sidhu
95	Maur	INC	Harminder Singh Jassi	AAP	Jagdev Singh Kamalu	SAD	Janmeja Singh Sekhon
96	Mansa	INC	Manoj Bala	AAP	Nazar Singh Manshahia	SAD	Jagdeep Singh Nakai
97	Sardulgarh	INC	Ajit Inder Singh	AAP	Sukhwinder Singh (Bhola Mann)	SAD	Dilraj Singh
98	Budhlada	INC	Ranjit Kaur Bhatti	AAP	Budh Ram	SAD	Nishan Singh
99	Lehra	INC	Rajinder Kaur Bhattal	AAP	Jasvir Singh	SAD	Parminder Singh Dhindsa
100	Dirba	INC	Ajaib Singh Ratolan	AAP	Harpal Singh Cheema	SAD	Gulzar Singh
101	Sunam	INC	Daaman Thind Bajwa	AAP	Aman Arora	SAD	Gobind Singh Longowal
102	Bhadaur	INC	Joginder Singh	AAP	Pirmal Singh Dhaula	SAD	Sant Balvir Singh Ghunas
103	Barnala	INC	Kewal Singh Dhillon	AAP	Gurmeet Singh Meet Hayer	SAD	Surinder Pal Singh Sibia
104	Mehal Kalan	INC	Harchand Kaur	AAP	Kulwant Singh Pandori	SAD	Ajit Singh Shant
105	Malerkotla	INC	Razia Sultana	AAP	Mohamad Arshad	SAD	Mohammad Owais
106	Amargarh	INC	Surjit Singh Dhiman	LIP	Jaswant Singh Gajjan Majra	SAD	Iqbal Singh Jhundan
107	Dhuri	INC	Dalvir Singh Khangura	AAP	Jasvir Singh Jassi Sekhon	SAD	Hari Singh
108	Sangrur	INC	Vijay Inder Singla	AAP	Dinesh Bansal	SAD	Parkash Chand Garg
109	Nabha	INC	Sadhu Singh Dharamsot	AAP	Gurdev Singh Mann	SAD	Kabir Dass
110	Patiala Rural	INC	Brahm Mohindra	AAP	Karanvir Singh Tiwana	SAD	Satbir Singh Khatra
111	Rajpura	INC	Hardial Singh Kamboj	AAP	Ashutosh Joshi	BJP	Harjit Singh Grewal
112	Dera Bassi	INC	Deepinder Singh	AAP	Sarabjit Kaur	SAD	Narinder Kumar Sharma
113	Ghanaur	INC	Thekedar Madan Lal Jalalpur	AAP	Anu Randhawa	SAD	Harpreet Kaur Mukhmailpur
114	Sanour	INC	Harinder Pal Singh Mann	AAP	Kuldeep Kaur Tohra	SAD	Harinder Pal Singh Chandumajra
115	Patiala	INC	Capt. Amarinder Singh	AAP	Dr. Balbir Singh	SAD	Joginder Jaswant Singh
116	Samana	INC	Rajinder Singh	AAP	Jagtar Singh Rajla	SAD	Surjit Singh Rakhra
117	Shutrana	INC	Nirmal Singh	AAP	Palwinder Kaur	SAD	Vaninder Kaur Loomba

== Opinion polls ==
Polling firm/Link	Date	SAD-BJP	INC	AAP
HuffPost-CVoter	Feb 2017	11	43	63
AajTak Axis My India	Jan 2017	11-15 (13)	60-65 (63)	41-44 (43)
ABP News-CSDS	Jan 2017	28-36 (32)	47-55 (51)	26-34 (30)
TV24 News	Jan 2017	20-25(22)	27-35(31)	70-80(75)
VDP Associates	Jan 2017	7	44	62
The Week-Hansa Research	Jan 2017	28-30 (29)	49-51 (50)	33-35 (34)
India Today Axis My India	Jan 2017	18-22 (20)	56-62 (59)	36-41 (39)
Lokniti-ABP-CSDS	Jan 2017	50-58 (54)	41-49 (45)	12-18 (15)
VDP Associates	Oct 2016	6	15	93
India Today Axis My India	Oct 2016	17-21 (19)	49-55 (52)	42-46 (44)
TV24 India	Aug 2016	20-25 (23)	27-35 (31)	70-80 (75)
HuffPost-C Voter	Mar 2016	06-12(9)	08-14(11)	94-100(97)
Election results	Mar 2017	18	77	20

=== Exit polls ===
All the exit polls other than India Today Axis My India, wrongly predicted the winner of the election. The exit polls were published on the day of the election in March 2017.

Polling firm/Link	SAD-BJP	INC	AAP
News24 Today's Chanakya	9 ± 5	54 ± 9	54 ± 9
India Today Axis My India	4-7	62-71	42-51
India TV CVoter	5-13	41-49	59-67
Election results	18	77	20

== Incidents ==
=== Voting Machine malfunction ===
Several reports of the Electronic Voting Machine malfunctioning was reported from multiple locations in the state. AAP said that it had received more than 406 complaints of EVM malfunction.

== Results ==
Seat Share
1. INC - 77 (65.8%)
2. AAP - 20 (18.1%)
3. SAD - 15 (12.8%)
Vote Share
1. INC (38.8%)
2. SAD (25.4%)
3. BSP (1.50%)
4. AAP (23.9%)
5. BJP (5.40%)
6. LIP (1.20%)
7. Others (4.70%)

Parties and coalitions	Popular vote			Seats		
Parties and coalitions	Votes	%	±pp	Contested	Won	+/−
Indian National Congress (INC)	5,945,899	38.77	▼1.47	117	77	+31
Aam Aadmi Party (AAP)	3,662,665	23.88	▲3.7	112	20	+20
Shiromani Akali Dal (SAD)	3,898,161	25.42	▼9.4	94	15	-41
Bharatiya Janata Party (BJP)	833,092	5.4	▼1.8	23	3	-9
Independents (IND)	323,243	2.1	▼5.0	303	0	▼3
Bahujan Samaj Party (BSP)	234,400	1.5	▼2.8	117	0	Steady
Lok Insaaf Party (LIP)	189,228	1.2	▲1.2	5	3	+3
Shiromani Akali Dal (A) SAD(A)	49,260	0.3	Steady	54	0	Steady
Aapna Punjab Party (APPA)	37,476	0.2	Steady	78	0	Steady
Revolutionary Marxist Party of India (RMPOI)	37,243	0.2	Steady	13	0	Steady
Communist Party of India (CPI)	34,074	0.2	▼0.6	23	0	Steady
None of the above (NOTA)	108,471	0.7	▲0.7	—N/a		Steady
Total	15,443,466	100.00			117	±0
Valid votes	15,443,466	99.87				
Invalid votes	19,337	0.13				
Votes cast / turnout	15,462,803	77.20				
Abstentions	4,566,843	22.80				
Registered voters	20,029,646					

=== Region wise results ===
Region	Seats					
Region	Seats	INC	AAP	SAD	BJP	LIP
Malwa	69	40	18	8	1	2
Majha	25	22	0	2	1	0
Doaba	23	15	2	5	1	0
Total	117	77	20	15	3	2

=== Results by district ===
#	Region	Seats					
#	Region	Seats	INC	AAP	SAD	BJP	LIP
1	Ludhiana	14	8	3	1	—N/a	2
2	Amritsar	11	10	—N/a	1	—N/a	—N/a
3	Jalandhar	9	5	—N/a	4	—N/a	—N/a
4	Patiala	8	7	—N/a	1	—N/a	—N/a
5	Gurdaspur	7	6	—N/a	1	—N/a	—N/a
6	Hoshiarpur	7	6	1	—N/a	—N/a	—N/a
7	Sangrur	7	4	2	1	—N/a	—N/a
8	Bathinda	6	3	3	—N/a	—N/a	—N/a
9	Fazilka	4	2	—N/a	1	1	—N/a
10	Firozpur	4	4	—N/a	—N/a	—N/a	—N/a
11	Kapurthala	4	2	1	—N/a	1	—N/a
12	Moga	4	3	1	—N/a	—N/a	—N/a
13	Sri Muktsar Sahib	4	2	—N/a	2	—N/a	—N/a
14	Tarn Taran	4	4	—N/a	—N/a	—N/a	—N/a
15	Barnala	3	—N/a	3	—N/a	—N/a	—N/a
16	Faridkot	3	1	2	—N/a	—N/a	—N/a
17	Fatehgarh Sahib	3	3	—N/a	—N/a	—N/a	—N/a
18	Mansa	3	—N/a	2	1	—N/a	—N/a
19	Nawanshahr	3	2	—N/a	1	—N/a	—N/a
20	Pathankot	3	2	—N/a	—N/a	1	—N/a
21	Rup Nagar	3	2	1	—N/a	—N/a	—N/a
22	S.A.S. Nagar	3	1	1	1	—N/a	—N/a
Total		117	77	20	15	3	2

=== Results by constituency ===
Source: Election Commission of India
Constituency			Winner				Runner Up				Margin	%
#	Name	Poll %	Candidate	Party	Votes	%	Candidate	Party	Votes	%	Margin	%
1	Sujanpur	78.85	Dinesh Singh	BJP	48,910	39.33	Amit Singh	INC	30,209	24.29	18,701	15.04
2	Bhoa (SC)	75.20	Joginder Pal	INC	87,865	51.95	Seema Kumari	BJP	40,369	30.90	27,496	21.05
3	Pathankot	76.13	Amit Vij	INC	56,383	51.28	Ashwani Kumar Sharma	BJP	45,213	41.12	11,170	10.16
4	Gurdaspur	75.60	Barindermeet Pahra	INC	67,709	57.97	Gurbachan Babbehali	SAD	38,753	33.18	28,956	24.79
5	Dina Nagar (SC)	71.80	Aruna Chaudhary	INC	72,176	55.82	Bishan Dass	BJP	40,259	31.14	31,917	24.68
6	Qadian	74.77	Fatehjang Bajwa	INC	62,596	47.83	Sewa Singh	SAD	50,859	38.86	11,737	8.97
7	Batala	69.83	Lakhbir Lodhinangal	SAD	42,517	34.65	Ashwani Sekhri	INC	42,032	34.26	485	0.39
8	Sri Hargobindpur (SC)	73.05	Balwinder Singh	INC	57,489	46.48	Manjit Singh	SAD	39,424	31.87	18,065	14.61
9	Fatehgarh Churian	75.04	Tripat Singh Bajwa	INC	54,348	43.99	Nirmal Singh Kahlon	SAD	52,349	42.37	1,999	1.62
10	Dera Baba Nanak	77.01	Sukhjinder Randhawa	INC	60,385	43.12	Sucha Singh Langah	SAD	59,191	42.27	1,194	0.85
11	Ajnala	82.38	Harpartap Singh	INC	61,378	50.79	Amarpal Singh	SAD	42,665	35.31	18,713	15.48
12	Raja Sansi	78.95	Sukhbinder Sarkaria	INC	59,628	45.49	Vir Singh Lopoke	SAD	53,901	41.12	5,727	4.37
13	Majitha	77.14	Bikram Singh Majithia	SAD	65,803	54.08	Sukhjinder Raj Singh	INC	42,919	35.27	22,884	18.81
14	Jandiala (SC)	74.08	Sukhwinder Bandala	INC	53,042	42.50	Dalbir Singh	SAD	34,620	27.74	18,422	14.76
15	Amritsar North	67.13	Sunil Dutti	INC	59,212	50.56	Anil Joshi	BJP	44,976	38.40	14,236	12.16
16	Amritsar West (SC)	59.83	Raj Kumar Verka	INC	52,271	48.97	Rakesh Gill	BJP	25,424	23.82	26,847	25.15
17	Amritsar Central	66.72	Om Parkash Soni	INC	51,242	57.07	Tarun Chugh	BJP	30,126	33.55	21,116	23.52
18	Amritsar East	64.87	Navjot Singh Sidhu	INC	60,477	61.01	Rajesh Kumar Honey	BJP	17,668	17.82	42,809	43.19
19	Amritsar South	62.74	Inderbir Singh Bolaria	INC	47,581	51.36	Inderbir Singh Nijjar	AAP	24,923	26.90	22,658	24.46
20	Attari (SC)	74.98	D.C. Tarsem Singh	INC	55,335	42.82	Gulzar Singh Ranike	SAD	45,133	34.93	10,202	7.89
21	Tarn Taran	72.22	Dharambir Agnihotri	INC	59,794	45.39	Harmeet Singh Sandhu	SAD	45,165	34.28	14,629	11.11
22	Khem Karan	77.56	Sukhpal Singh Bhullar	INC	81,897	53.52	Virsa Singh	SAD	62,295	40.71	19,602	12.81
23	Patti	75.54	Harminder Singh Gill	INC	64,617	45.30	Adesh Partap Singh Kairon	SAD	56,254	39.43	8,363	5.87
24	Khadoor Sahib	75.30	Ramanjit Singh Sikki	INC	64,666	44.43	Ravinder Brahmpura	SAD	47,611	32.71	17,055	11.72
25	Baba Bakala (SC)	69.41	Santokh Singh	INC	45,965	35.43	Dalbir Singh Tong	AAP	39,378	30.35	6,587	5.08
26	Bholath	74.87	Sukhpal Singh Khaira	AAP	48,873	50.09	Yuvraj Bhupinder Singh	SAD	40,671	41.69	8,202	8.40
27	Kapurthala	74.69	Rana Gurjit Singh	INC	56,378	53.75	Advocate Paramjit Singh	SAD	27,561	26.28	28,817	27.47
28	Sultanpur Lodhi	76.93	Navtej Singh Cheema	INC	41,843	38.79	Upinderjit Kaur	SAD	33,681	31.22	8,162	7.57
29	Phagwara (SC)	72.80	Som Parkash	BJP	45,479	35.32	Joginder Singh Mann	INC	43,470	33.76	2,009	1.56
30	Phillaur (SC)	75.78	Baldev Singh Khaira	SAD	41,336	28.31	Vikramjit Singh Chaudhary	INC	37,859	25.93	3,477	2.38
31	Nakodar	77.44	Gurpratap Singh Wadala	SAD	56,241	39.53	Sarwan Singh Hayer	AAP	37,834	26.59	18,407	12.94
32	Shahkot	78.58	Ajit Singh Kohar	SAD	46,913	34.88	Hardev Singh Ladi	INC	42,008	31.23	4,905	3.65
33	Kartarpur (SC)	73.95	Chaudhary Singh	INC	46,729	37.30	Seth Sat Paul	SAD	40,709	32.50	6,020	4.80
34	Jalandhar West (SC)	72.81	Sushil Kumar Rinku	INC	53,983	49.33	Mahinder Pal Bhagat	BJP	36,649	33.49	17,334	15.84
35	Jalandhar Central	68.21	Rajinder Beri	INC	55,518	52.72	Manoranjan Kalia	BJP	31,440	29.86	24,078	22.86
36	Jalandhar North	72.20	Avtar Singh Jr.	INC	69,715	56.54	K D Bhandari	BJP	37,424	30.35	32,291	26.19
37	Jalandhar Cantt.	68.74	Pargat Singh Powar	INC	59,349	47.34	Sarabjit Singh Makkar	SAD	30,225	24.11	29,124	23.23
38	Adampur (SC)	73.38	Pawan Kumar Tinu	SAD	45,229	39.12	Mohinder Singh Kaypee	INC	37,530	32.46	7,699	6.66
39	Mukerian	70.70	Rajnish Kumar Babbi	INC	56,787	42.10	Arunesh Kumar	BJP	33,661	24.96	23,126	17.14
40	Dasuya	69.04	Arun Dogra	INC	56,527	43.61	Sukhjit Kaur	BJP	38,889	30.00	17,638	13.61
41	Urmar	71.53	Sangat Singh Gilzian	INC	51,477	41.10	Arbinder Singh Rasulpur	SAD	36,523	29.16	14,954	11.94
42	Sham Chaurasi (SC)	74.30	Pawan Kumar Adia	INC	46,612	37.90	Dr. Ravjot Singh	AAP	42,797	34.80	3,815	3.10
43	Hoshiarpur	69.92	Sunder Sham Arora	INC	49,951	40.88	Tikshan Sud	BJP	38,718	31.69	11,233	9.19
44	Chabbewal (SC)	74.18	Dr. Raj Kumar	INC	57,857	50.32	Sohan Singh Thandal	SAD	28,596	24.87	29,261	25.45
45	Garhshankar	74.09	Jai Krishan	AAP	41,720	33.50	Surinder Singh Heer	SAD	40,070	32.18	1,650	1.32
46	Banga (SC)	77.06	Sukhwinder Kumar	SAD	45,256	37.16	Harjot	AAP	43,363	35.61	1,893	1.55
47	Nawanshahr	76.49	Angad Singh	INC	38,197	29.89	Jarnail Singh Wahid	SAD	34,874	27.29	3,323	2.60
48	Balachaur	79.18	Darshan Lal	INC	49,558	42.52	Nand Lal	SAD	29,918	25.67	19,640	16.85
49	Anandpur Sahib	74.95	Kanwar Pal Singh	INC	60,800	45.30	Dr. Parminder Sharma	BJP	36,919	27.51	23,881	17.79
50	Rupnagar	76.70	Amarjit Singh Sandoa	AAP	58,994	45.67	Brinder Singh Dhillon	INC	35,287	27.32	23,707	18.35
51	Chamkaur Sahib (SC)	77.78	Charanjit Singh Channi	INC	61,060	42.26	Charanjit Singh	AAP	48,752	33.74	12,308	8.52
52	Kharar	71.81	Kanwar Sandhu	AAP	54,171	34.19	Jagmohan Singh Kang	INC	52,159	32.92	2,012	1.27
53	S.A.S. Nagar	67.22	Balbir Singh Sidhu	INC	66,844	47.86	Narinder Singh	AAP	38,971	27.90	27,873	19.96
54	Bassi Pathana (SC)	79.68	Gurpreet Singh	INC	47,319	41.82	Santokh Singh	AAP	37,273	32.94	10,046	8.88
55	Fatehgarh Sahib	83.34	Kuljit Singh Nagra	INC	58,205	46.95	Didar Singh Bhatti	SAD	34,338	27.70	23,867	19.25
56	Amloh	83.71	Randeep Singh	INC	39,669	35.23	Gurpreet Singh Raju	SAD	35,723	31.72	3,946	3.51
57	Khanna	78.95	Gurkirat Singh Kotli	INC	55,690	44.29	Anil Dutt Phally	AAP	35,099	27.92	20,591	16.37
58	Samrala	80.63	Amrik Singh Dhillon	INC	51,930	38.77	Sarbans Singh Manki	AAP	40,925	30.55	11,005	8.22
59	Sahnewal	76.18	Sharanjit Singh Dhillon	SAD	63,184	38.07	Satwinder Kaur Bitti	INC	58,633	35.33	4,551	2.74
60	Ludhiana East	71.46	Sanjeev Talwar	INC	43,010	33.30	Daljit Singh Grewal	AAP	41,429	32.08	1,581	1.22
61	Ludhiana South	68.00	Balwinder Singh Bains	LIP	53,955	53.54	Bhupinder Singh Sidhu	INC	23,038	22.86	30,917	30.68
62	Atam Nagar	67.98	Simarjit Singh Bains	LIP	53,421	50.32	Kamal Jit Singh Karwal	INC	36,508	34.39	16,913	15.93
63	Ludhiana Central	69.77	Surinder Kumar Dawar	INC	47,871	46.96	Gurdev Sharma Debi	BJP	27,391	26.87	20,480	20.09
64	Ludhiana West	69.25	Bharat Bhushan Ashu	INC	66,627	54.86	Ahbaab Singh Grewal	AAP	30,106	24.79	36,521	30.07
65	Ludhiana North	68.46	Rakesh Pandey	INC	44,864	36.40	Parveen Bansal	BJP	39,732	32.24	5,132	4.16
66	Gill (SC)	75.78	Kuldeep Singh Vaid (Bulara)	INC	67,927	37.83	Jiwan Singh Sangowal	AAP	59,286	33.01	8,641	4.82
67	Payal (SC)	82.33	Lakhvir Singh Lakha	INC	57,776	44.19	Gurpreet Singh Lapran	AAP	36,280	27.75	21,496	16.44
68	Dakha	81.47	Harvinder Singh Phoolka	AAP	58,923	40.55	Manpreet Singh Ayali	SAD	54,754	37.68	4,169	2.87
69	Raikot (SC)	78.36	Jagtar Singh	AAP	48,245	41.22	Amar Singh	INC	37,631	32.15	10,614	9.07
70	Jagraon (SC)	77.19	Saravjit Kaur Manuke	AAP	61,521	45.69	Malkit Singh Dakha	INC	35,945	26.69	25,576	19.00
71	Nihal Singhwala (SC)	78.69	Manjit Singh	AAP	67,313	44.77	Rajwinder Kaur	INC	39,739	26.43	27,574	18.34
72	Bhagha Purana	81.98	Darshan Singh Brar	INC	48,668	35.48	Gurbinder Singh Kang	AAP	41,418	30.20	7,250	5.28
73	Moga	75.17	Harjot Kamal Singh	INC	52,357	36.19	Ramesh Grover	AAP	50,593	34.97	1,764	1.22
74	Dharamkot	82.69	Sukhjit Singh	INC	63,238	44.23	Tota Singh	SAD	41,020	28.69	22,218	15.54
75	Zira	85.04	Kulbir Singh	INC	69,899	46.37	Hari Singh Zira	SAD	46,828	31.06	23,071	15.31
76	Firozpur City	70.46	Parminder Singh Pinki	INC	67,559	54.26	Sukhpal Singh	BJP	37,972	30.50	29,587	23.76
77	Firozpur Rural (SC)	84.37	Satkar Kaur	INC	71,037	45.60	Joginder Singh Jindu	SAD	49,657	31.87	21,380	13.73
78	Guru Har Sahai	87.07	Gurmit Sodhi	INC	62,787	45.97	Vardev Singh	SAD	56,991	41.73	5,796	4.24
79	Jalalabad	86.91	Sukhbir Singh Badal	SAD	75,271	44.82	Bhagwant Mann	AAP	56,771	33.80	18,500	11.02
80	Fazilka	87.07	Davinder Singh Ghubaya	INC	39,276	27.58	Surjit Kumar Jyani	BJP	39,011	27.39	265	0.19
81	Abohar	78.37	Arun Narang	BJP	55,091	44.46	Sunil Jakhar	INC	51,812	41.81	3,279	2.65
82	Balluana (SC)	83.43	Nathu Ram	INC	65,607	46.35	Parkash Singh Bhatti	SAD	50,158	35.43	15,449	10.92
83	Lambi	85.71	Parkash Singh	SAD	66,375	49.95	Amarinder Singh	INC	43,605	32.81	22,770	17.14
84	Gidderbaha	88.99	Amrinder Singh Raja	INC	63,500	45.90	Hardeep Singh Dhillon	SAD	47,288	34.18	16,212	11.72
85	Malout (SC)	82.62	Ajaib Singh Bhatti	INC	49,098	36.29	Darshan Singh	SAD	44,109	32.60	4,989	3.69
86	Muktsar	83.52	Kanwarjit Singh	SAD	44,894	30.70	Karan Kaur	INC	36,914	25.24	7,980	5.46
87	Faridkot	82.01	Kushaldeep Singh Dhillon	INC	51,026	40.61	Gurdit Singh Sekhon	AAP	39,367	31.33	11,659	9.28
88	Kotkapura	80.49	Kultar Sandhwan	AAP	47,401	38.97	Harnirpal Singh	INC	37,326	30.69	10,075	8.28
89	Jaitu (SC)	83.63	Baldev Singh	AAP	45,344	38.05	Mohammad Sadique	INC	35,351	29.67	9,993	8.38
90	Rampura Phul	86.19	Gurpreet Singh Kangar	INC	55,269	40.59	Sikander Singh Maluka	SAD	44,884	32.96	10,385	7.63
91	Bhucho Mandi (SC)	84.33	Pritam Singh Kotbhai	INC	51,605	34.20	Jagsir Singh	AAP	50,960	33.77	645	0.43
92	Bathinda Urban	73.64	Manpreet Singh Badal	INC	63,942	42.58	Deepak Bansal	AAP	45,462	30.27	18,480	12.31
93	Bathinda Rural (SC)	81.93	Rupinder Kaur Ruby	AAP	51,572	40.98	Er. Amit Rattan Kotfatta	SAD	40,794	32.41	10,778	8.57
94	Talwandi Sabo	85.99	Prof. Baljinder Kaur	AAP	54,553	42.67	Khushbaz Singh Jatana	INC	35,260	27.58	19,293	15.09
95	Maur	84.50	Jagdev Singh	AAP	62,282	45.55	Janmeja Singh Sekhon	SAD	47,605	34.81	14,677	10.74
96	Mansa	84.30	Nazar Singh Manshahia	AAP	70,586	40.78	Manoj Bala	INC	50,117	28.96	20,469	11.82
97	Sardulgarh	88.79	Dilraj Singh	SAD	59,420	38.94	Ajit Inder Singh	INC	50,563	33.13	8,857	5.81
98	Budhlada (SC)	87.59	Budh Ram	AAP	52,265	32.37	Ranjit Kaur Bhatti	INC	50,989	31.58	1,276	0.79
99	Lehra	85.25	Parminder Singh Dhindsa	SAD	65,550	47.76	Rajinder Kaur Bhattal	INC	38,735	28.22	26,815	19.54
100	Dirba (SC)	83.62	Harpal Singh Cheema	AAP	46,434	32.13	Ajaib Singh Ratolan	INC	44,789	30.99	1,645	1.14
101	Sunam	83.87	Aman Arora	AAP	72,815	47.38	Gobind Singh Longowal	SAD	42,508	27.66	30,307	19.72
102	Bhadaur (SC)	83.10	Pirmal Singh Dhaula	AAP	57,095	45.15	Sant Balvir Singh Ghunas	SAD	36,311	28.71	20,784	16.44
103	Barnala	78.01	Gurmeet Singh Meet Haher	AAP	47,606	35.72	Kewal Singh Dhillon	INC	45,174	33.90	2,432	1.82
104	Mehal Kalan (SC)	80.84	Kulwant Singh Pandori	AAP	57,551	46.12	Ajit Singh Shant	SAD	30,487	24.43	27,064	21.69
105	Malerkotla	84.56	Razia Sultana	INC	58,982	46.94	Md. Owais	SAD	46,280	36.83	12,702	10.11
106	Amargarh	84.19	Surjit Singh Dhiman	INC	50,994	39.02	Iqbal Singh Jhundan	SAD	39,115	29.93	11,879	9.09
107	Dhuri	81.04	Dalvir Singh Goldy	INC	49,347	38.62	Jasvir Singh Jassi Sekhon	AAP	46,536	36.42	2,811	2.20
108	Sangrur	80.61	Vijay Inder Singla	INC	67,310	47.40	Dinesh Bansal	AAP	36,498	25.70	30,812	21.70
109	Nabha (SC)	81.08	Sadhu Singh	INC	60,861	43.12	Gurdev Singh Dev Mann	AAP	41,866	29.66	18,995	13.46
110	Patiala Rural	71.34	Brahm Mohindra	INC	68,891	47.30	Karanvir Singh Tiwana	AAP	41,662	28.60	27,229	18.70
111	Rajpura	76.86	Hardial Singh Kamboj	INC	59,107	46.52	Ashutosh Joshi	AAP	26,542	20.89	32,565	25.63
112	Dera Bassi	74.26	Narinder Kumar Sharma	SAD	70,792	40.04	Deepinder Singh	INC	68,871	38.96	1,921	1.08
113	Ghanaur	80.47	Thekedar Madan Lal Jalalpur	INC	65,965	52.92	Harpreet Kaur Mukhmailpur	SAD	29,408	23.59	36,557	29.33
114	Sanour	80.41	Harinder Pal Singh	SAD	58,867	35.89	Harinder Pal Singh Mann	INC	53,997	32.92	4,870	2.97
115	Patiala	66.92	Amarinder Singh	INC	72,586	68.99	Dr. Balbir Singh	AAP	20,179	19.18	52,407	49.81
116	Samana	83.57	Rajinder Singh	INC	62,551	42.21	Surjit Singh Rakhra	SAD	52,702	35.57	9,849	6.64
117	Shutrana (SC)	83.53	Nirmal Singh	INC	58,008	42.11	Vaninder Kaur Loomba	SAD	39,488	28.66	18,520	13.45

== Government Formation ==
On March 11, 2017, the results of the Punjab Assembly elections were declared and the Akali-BJP coalition was defeated. Punjab Chief Minister Prakash Singh Badal resigned in next 12 days.

On March 16, 2017, Capt. Amarinder Singh was sworn in as Chief Minister of Punjab, along with nine of his cabinet ministers.

== Bypolls (2017-2022) ==
No.	Date	Constituency	MLA before election	Party before election	Elected MLA	Party after election	Reason
1.	28 May 2018	Shahkot	Ajit Singh Kohar	Shiromani Akali Dal	Hardev Singh Ladi	Indian National Congress	Death
2.	21 October 2019	Phagwara (SC)	Som Parkash	Bharatiya Janata Party	Balwinder Singh Dhaliwal	Indian National Congress	Elected to Lok Sabha
3.	21 October 2019	Mukerian	Rajnish Kumar	Indian National Congress	Indu Bala	Indian National Congress	Death
4.	21 October 2019	Jalalabad	Sukhbir Singh Badal	Shiromani Akali Dal	Raminder Singh Awla	Indian National Congress	Elected to Lok Sabha
5.	21 October 2019	Dakha	H. S. Phoolka	Aam Aadmi Party	Manpreet Singh Ayali	Shiromani Akali Dal	Resigned

== See also ==
- Politics of Punjab, India
- 2022 Punjab Legislative Assembly election
- 2019 Indian general election in Punjab
- List of constituencies of Punjab Legislative Assembly
- 2017 elections in India
