= Rajinder Pal Kaur =

Indian politician

MLA, Punjab Legislative Assembly
- Incumbent
- Assumed office 2022
- Preceded by: Balwinder Singh Bains
- Constituency: Ludhiana South
- Majority: Aam Aadmi Party

Personal details
- Party: Aam Aadmi Party

Rajinder Pal Kaur Chhina is an Indian politician and the MLA representing the Ludhiana South Assembly constituency in the Punjab Legislative Assembly. She is a member of the Aam Aadmi Party. She was elected as the MLA in the 2022 Punjab Legislative Assembly election.

== Member of Legislative Assembly ==
She represents the Ludhiana South Assembly constituency as MLA in Punjab Assembly. The Aam Aadmi Party gained a strong 79% majority in the sixteenth Punjab Legislative Assembly by winning 92 out of 117 seats in the 2022 Punjab Legislative Assembly election. MP Bhagwant Mann was sworn in as Chief Minister on 16 March 2022.

Committee assignments of Punjab Legislative Assembly

- Member (2022–23) Committee on Local Bodies
- Member (2022–23) Committee on Panchayati Raj Institutions

== Electoral performance ==
Punjab Assembly election, 2022: Ludhiana South
Party	Candidate	Votes	%	±%
AAP	Rajinder Pal Kaur Chhina	43,811	41.56	
BJP	Satinderpal Singh Tajpuri	17,673	16.76	New entry
INC	Ishwarjot Singh Cheema	15,604	14.8	
LIP	Balwinder Singh Bains	11,906	11.29	
SAD	Jathedar Hira Singh Gabria	11,243	10.66	
RRP	Sumit Kumar	85	0.08	
Majority		26,138	24.8	
Turnout		105,427		
Registered electors				

State Legislative Assembly
Preceded by Balwinder Singh Bains	Member of the Punjab Legislative Assembly from Ludhiana South Assembly constituency 2022 –	Incumbent
