= Samrala Assembly constituency =

Legislative Assembly constituency in Punjab State, India

Coordinates: 30.84°N 76.19°E

Samrala
- Constituency No. 58 for the Punjab Legislative Assembly

Constituency details
- Country: India
- State: Punjab
- District: Ludhiana
- Lok Sabha constituency: Fatehgarh Sahib
- Established: 1951
- Total electors: 175,822 (in 2022)
- Reservation: None

Member of Legislative Assembly
- 16th Punjab Legislative Assembly
- Incumbent Jagtar Singh Diyalpura
- Party: Aam Aadmi Party
- Elected year: 2022

Samrala Assembly constituency (Sl. No.: 58) is a Punjab Legislative Assembly constituency in Ludhiana district, Punjab state, India.

== Members of the Legislative Assembly ==
Most successful parties from Samrala Vidhan Sabha
1. INC (8 Times) (44.4%)
2. SAD (7 Times) (38.9%)
3. AAP (1 Time) (5.56%)
4. AD – SFS (1 Time) (5.56%)
5. INC (I) (1 Time) (5.56%)

Year	Member	Party
1952	Naurang Singh	Shiromani Akali Dal
1952	Ajmer Singh	Shiromani Akali Dal
1957	Ajmer Singh	Indian National Congress
1957	Jagir Singh	Indian National Congress
1962	Ajmer Singh	Indian National Congress
1967	J. Singh	Akali Dal – Sant Fateh Singh Group
1969	Kapur Singh	Shiromani Akali Dal
1972	Prehlad Singh	Shiromani Akali Dal
1977	Prehlad Singh	Shiromani Akali Dal
1980	Karam Singh	Indian National Congress (Indira)
1985	Amarjit Singh	Shiromani Akali Dal
1992	Karam Singh	Indian National Congress
1997	Amrik Singh Dhillon	Indian National Congress
2002	Amrik Singh Dhillon	Indian National Congress
2007	Jagjiwan Singh	Shiromani Akali Dal
2012	Amrik Singh Dhillon	Indian National Congress
2017	Amrik Singh Dhillon	Indian National Congress
2022	Jagtar Singh Diyalpura|	Aam Aadmi Party

== Election results ==
=== 2027 ===
Punjab Assembly election, 2027: Samrala
Party	Candidate	Votes	%	±%
AAP	Jagtar Singh Diyalpura			
AD (WPD)				New entry
INC				
BSP				
SAD				
BJP				
NOTA	None of the above			
Majority				
Turnout				

=== 2022 ===
Punjab Assembly election, 2022: Samrala
Party	Candidate	Votes	%	±%
AAP	Jagtar Singh Diyalpura	57,557	43.11	
SAD	Paramjit Singh Dhillon	26,667	20.1	
INC	Rupinder Singh Raja Gill	23,368	17.6	
SAD(A)	Varinder Singh Sekhon	8,328	6.3	
Independent	Amrik Singh Dhillon	7,693	5.8	
Independent	Balbir Singh Rajewal	4,676	3.5	
BJP	Ranjit Singh Gahlewal	2,331	1.8	
NOTA	None of the Above	941	0.5	
Majority		30,890	23.14	
Turnout		133,524	75.7	
Registered electors		175,822		

=== 2017 ===
Punjab Assembly election, 2017: Samrala
Party	Candidate	Votes	%	±%
INC	Amrik Singh Dhillon	51,930	38.77	
AAP	Sarbans Singh Manki	40,925	30.55	
SAD	Santa Singh Umaidpur	38,114	28.45	
SAD(A)	Shingara Singh	837	.62	
BSP	Dalvir Singh	687	.51	
SAKP	Dilbagh Singh	386	.29	
Majority		11,005	8.21	
Turnout		133,951	80.00	
Registered electors		167,423		
INC hold		Swing		

== See also ==
- List of constituencies of the Punjab Legislative Assembly
- Ludhiana district
- Amrik Singh Dhillon
