= Kulwant Singh Sidhu =

Indian politician

MLA, Punjab Legislative Assembly
- Incumbent
- Assumed office 2022
- Preceded by: Simarjit Singh Bains
- Constituency: Atam Nagar
- Majority: Aam Aadmi Party

Personal details
- Party: Aam Aadmi Party

Kulwant Singh Sidhu is an Indian politician and the MLA representing the Atam Nagar Assembly constituency in the Punjab Legislative Assembly. He is a member of the Aam Aadmi Party. He was elected as the MLA in the 2022 Punjab Legislative Assembly election.

== Member of Legislative Assembly ==
He represents the Atam Nagar Assembly constituency as MLA in Punjab Assembly. The Aam Aadmi Party gained a strong 79% majority in the sixteenth Punjab Legislative Assembly by winning 92 out of 117 seats in the 2022 Punjab Legislative Assembly election. MP Bhagwant Mann was sworn in as Chief Minister on 16 March 2022.

Committee assignments of Punjab Legislative Assembly

- Member (2022–23) Committee on Estimates
- Member (2022–23) Committee on Local Bodies

== Electoral performance ==
Punjab Assembly election, 2022: Atam Nagar
Party	Candidate	Votes	%	±%
AAP	Kulwant Singh Sidhu	44,601	42.44	
INC	Kamaljit Singh Karwal	28,247	26.88	
LIP	Simarjit Singh Bains	12,720	12.1	
BJP	Prem Mittal	9,447	8.99	
SAD	Harish Rai	7,120	6.78	
NOTA	None of the above	810	0.77	
Majority		16,354	15.56	
Registered electors		170,654		
AAP gain from LIP		Swing		

State Legislative Assembly
Preceded by -	Member of the Punjab Legislative Assembly from Atam Nagar Assembly constituency 2022 –	Incumbent
