= Santosh Kumari Kataria =

Indian politician

MLA, Punjab Legislative Assembly
- Incumbent
- Assumed office 2022
- Preceded by: Darshan Lal
- Constituency: Balachaur

Personal details
- Party: Aam Aadmi Party

Santosh Kumari Katariaa is an Indian politician and the MLA representing the Balachaur Assembly constituency in the Punjab Legislative Assembly. She is a member of the Aam Aadmi Party. She was elected as the MLA in the 2022 Punjab Legislative Assembly election.

== Member of Legislative Assembly ==
She represents the Balachaur Assembly constituency as MLA in Punjab Assembly. The Aam Aadmi Party gained a strong 79% majority in the sixteenth Punjab Legislative Assembly by winning 92 out of 117 seats in the 2022 Punjab Legislative Assembly election. MP Bhagwant Mann was sworn in as Chief Minister on 16 March 2022.

Committee assignments of Punjab Legislative Assembly

- Member (2022–23) Committee on Estimates
- Member (2022–23) Committee on Panchayati Raj Institutions

== Electoral performance ==
Punjab Assembly election, 2022: Balachaur
Party	Candidate	Votes	%	±%
AAP	Santosh Kumari Kataria	39,633	34.47	
SAD	Sunita Chaudhary	35,092	30.52	
INC	Chaudhary Darshan Lal	31,201	27.14	
BJP	Ashok Baath	5,566	4.84	New
NOTA	None of the above	679	0.40	
Majority		4,541	3.9	
Turnout		114,964	73.6	
Registered electors		156,211		

State Legislative Assembly
Preceded by -	Member of the Punjab Legislative Assembly from Balachaur Assembly constituency 2022 –	Incumbent
