= Gurudaspur Assembly constituency =

Legislative Assembly constituency in Punjab State, India

Coordinates: 32.05°N 75.41°E

Gurdaspur
- Constituency No. 4 for the Punjab Legislative Assembly

Constituency details
- Country: India
- State: Punjab
- District: Gurdaspur
- Lok Sabha constituency: Gurdaspur
- Total electors: 169,628 (in 2022)
- Reservation: None

Member of Legislative Assembly
- 16th Punjab Legislative Assembly
- Incumbent Barindermeet Singh Pahra
- Party: Indian National Congress
- Elected year: 2022

Gurdaspur Assembly constituency is a Punjab Legislative Assembly constituency in Gurdaspur district, Punjab state, India.

== Members of Legislative Assembly ==
Most successful parties from Gurdaspur Vidhan Sabha
1. INC (13 Times) (72.2%)
2. SAD (4 Times) (22.2%)
3. INC (I) (1 Time) (5.56%)

Year	Member	Party
1952	Sunder Singh	Indian National Congress
1952	Parbodh Chandra	Indian National Congress
1957	Sunder Singh	Indian National Congress
1957	Parbodh Chandra	Indian National Congress
1962	Prabodh Chandra	Indian National Congress
1967	Prabodh Chandra	Indian National Congress
1969	Mohinder Singh	Shiromani Akali Dal
1972	Khushhal Bahl	Indian National Congress
1977	Khushhal Bahl	Indian National Congress
1980	Rattan Lal	Indian National Congress (Indira)
1985	Susheel	Indian National Congress
1992	Khushhal Bahl	Indian National Congress
1997	Kartar Singh Pahra	Shiromani Akali Dal
2002	Khushhal Bahl	Indian National Congress
2007	Gurbachan Singh Babbehali	Shiromani Akali Dal
2012	Gurbachan Singh Babbehali	Shiromani Akali Dal
2017	Barindermeet Singh Pahra	Indian National Congress
2022	Barindermeet Singh Pahra	Indian National Congress

== Election results ==
=== 2027 ===
Punjab Assembly election, 2027: Gurdaspur
Party	Candidate	Votes	%	±%
INC				
SAD				
AAP	Raman Bahl			
AD (WPD)				New entry
BSP				
BJP				
NOTA	None of the above			
Majority				
Turnout				

=== 2022 ===
Punjab Assembly election, 2022: Gurudaspur
Party	Candidate	Votes	%	±%
INC	Barindermeet Singh Pahra	43,743	35.23	▼22.74
SAD	Gurbachan Singh Babbehali	36,408	29.33	▼3.85
AAP	Raman Bahl	29,500	23.76	▲17.81
BJP	Parminder Singh Gill	9,819	7.91	New
SSP	Inderpal Singh	2,391	1.93	New
NOTA	None of the above	699	0.56	▲0.05
Majority		7,335	5.90	
Turnout		124,152		
Registered electors		169,628		
INC hold		Swing		

=== 2017 ===
Punjab Assembly election, 2017: Gurudaspur
Party	Candidate	Votes	%	±%
INC	Barindermeet Singh Pahra	67,709	57.97	▲21.33
SAD	Gurbachan Singh Babbehali	38,753	33.18	▼24.07
AAP	Amarjit Singh Chahal	6,949	5.95	new
NOTA	None of the above	593	0.51	−−
Majority		28,956	24.88	
Turnout		117,390	75.60	▲0.88
Registered electors		152,519		
INC gain from SAD		Swing		

=== 2012 ===
Punjab Assembly election, 2012: Gurudaspur
Party	Candidate	Votes	%	±%
SAD	Gurbachan Singh Babbehali	59,905	57.25	▲7.57
INC	Raman Bahl	38,335	36.64	▼8.85
Majority		19,570	18.70	
Turnout		104,629	74.72	▲1.20
SAD hold		Swing		

=== 2007 ===
Punjab Assembly election, 2007: Gurudaspur
Party	Candidate	Votes	%	±%
SAD	Gurbachan Singh Babbehali	51,446	49.68	▲20.02
INC	Pritam Singh Bhinder	47,109	45.49	▲1.23
Majority		4,337	4.18	
Turnout		103,540	73.52	▲7.97
SAD gain from INC		Swing		
