= Ludhiana South Assembly constituency =

Constituency of the Punjab legislative assembly in India

Coordinates: 30.86°N 75.91°E

Ludhiana South
- Constituency No. 61 for the Punjab Legislative Assembly

Constituency details
- Country: India
- State: Punjab
- District: Ludhiana
- Lok Sabha constituency: Ludhiana
- Established: 2008
- Total electors: 178,167
- Reservation: None

Member of Legislative Assembly
- 16th Punjab Legislative Assembly
- Incumbent Rajinder Pal Kaur
- Party: Aam Aadmi Party
- Elected year: 2022

Ludhiana South Assembly constituency (Sl. No.: 61) is a Punjab Legislative Assembly constituency in Ludhiana district, Punjab state, India. It is part of Ludhiana district.

== Members of the Legislative Assembly ==
Most successful parties from Ludhiana South Vidhan Sabha
1. INC (4 Times) (44.4%)
2. AAP (1 Time) (11.1%)
3. BJS (1 Time) (11.1%)
4. IND (1 Time) (11.1%)
5. LIP(1 Time) (11.1%)
6. SAD (1 Time) (11.1%)

Year	Member	Party
Constituency name: "Ludhiana City South"
1952	Bhim Sen Sachar	Indian National Congress
Constituency renamed "Ludhiana South"
1957	Ramdayal Singh	Indian National Congress
1962	Shamsher Singh	Shiromani Akali Dal
1967	V.A. Vishwanath	Bharatiya Jana Sangh
1969	Jogindar Pal Panday	Indian National Congress
1972	Jogindar Pal Panday	Indian National Congress
1977-2008 : Constituency disbanded
2012	Balwinder Singh Bains	Independent politician
2017	Balwinder Singh Bains	Lok Insaaf Party
2022	Rajinder Pal Kaur	Aam Aadmi Party

== Election results ==
=== 2027 ===
Punjab Assembly election, 2027: Ludhiana South
Party	Candidate	Votes	%	±%
AAP				
AD (WPD)				New entry
INC				
BSP				
SAD				
BJP				
NOTA	None of the above			
Majority				
Turnout				

=== 2022 ===
Punjab Assembly election, 2022: Ludhiana South
Party	Candidate	Votes	%	±%
AAP	Rajinder Pal Kaur Chhina	43,811	41.56	
BJP	Satinderpal Singh Tajpuri	17,673	16.76	New entry
INC	Ishwarjot Singh Cheema	15,604	14.8	
LIP	Balwinder Singh Bains	11,906	11.29	
SAD	Jathedar Hira Singh Gabria	11,243	10.66	
RRP	Sumit Kumar	85	0.08	
Majority		26,138	24.8	
Turnout		105,427		
Registered electors				

=== 2017 ===
Punjab Assembly election, 2017: Ludhiana South
Party	Candidate	Votes	%	±%
LIP	Balwinder Singh Bains	53,955	53.1	
INC	Bhupinder Singh Sidhu	23,038	22.7	
SAD	Hira Singh Gabria	20,554	20.2	
NOTA	None of the above	944	0.6	
Majority		30,917	30.7	
Turnout		100,769	68.0	
Registered electors		149,582		

== See also ==
- List of constituencies of the Punjab Legislative Assembly
- Ludhiana district
