= Atam Nagar Assembly constituency =

Legislative Assembly constituency in Punjab State, India

Coordinates: 30.88°N 75.85°E

Atam Nagar
- Constituency No. 62 for the Punjab Legislative Assembly

Constituency details
- Country: India
- State: Punjab
- District: Ludhiana
- Lok Sabha constituency: Ludhiana
- Total electors: 170,654 (in 2022)
- Reservation: None

Member of Legislative Assembly
- 16th Punjab Legislative Assembly
- Incumbent Kulwant Singh Sidhu
- Party: Aam Aadmi Party
- Elected year: 2022

Atam Nagar Assembly constituency (Sl. No.: 62) is a Punjab Legislative Assembly constituency in Ludhiana district, Punjab state, India.

== Members of the Legislative Assembly ==
Most successful parties from Atam Nagar Vidhan Sabha
1. IND (1 Time) (33.3%)
2. LIP(1 Time) (33.3%)
3. AAP (1 Time) (33.3%)

Year	Member	Party
2012	Simarjit Singh Bains	Independent
2017	Simarjit Singh Bains	Lok Insaaf Party
2022	Kulwant Singh Sidhu	Aam Aadmi Party

== Election results ==
=== 2027 ===
Punjab Assembly election, 2027: Atam Nagar
Party	Candidate	Votes	%	±%
AAP	Kulwant Singh Sidhu			
AD (WPD)				New entry
INC				
BSP				
SAD				
BJP				
NOTA	None of the above			
Majority				
Turnout				

=== 2022 ===
Punjab Assembly election, 2022: Atam Nagar
Party	Candidate	Votes	%	±%
AAP	Kulwant Singh Sidhu	44,601	42.44	New entry
INC	Kamaljit Singh Karwal	28,247	26.88	▼7.20
LIP	Simarjit Singh Bains	12,720	12.10	▼37.77
BJP	Prem Mittal	9,447	8.99	New entry
SAD	Harish Rai	7,120	6.78	▼6.42
NOTA	None of the above	810	0.77	
Majority		16,354	15.56	
Registered electors		170,654		
AAP gain from LIP		Swing		

=== 2017 ===
Punjab Assembly election, 2017: Atam Nagar
Party	Candidate	Votes	%	±%
LIP	Simarjit Singh Bains	53,421	49.87	▼2.50
INC	Kamal Jit Singh Karwal	36,508	34.08	▲14.74
SAD	Gurmeet Singh Kular	14,138	13.20	▼9.94
NOTA	None of the above	963	0.9	
Majority		16,913	15.90	
Turnout		106,156	68.0	
Registered electors		157,578		
LIP hold		Swing		

=== 2012 ===
Punjab Assembly election, 2012: Atam Nagar
Party	Candidate	Votes	%	±%
Independent	Simarjit Singh Bains	51,063	52.37	New entry
SAD	Hira Singh Gabria	22,560	23.14	New entry
INC	Malkit Singh Birmi	18,863	19.34	New entry
PPoP	Ajit Singh Khurana	1,441	1.48	New entry
BSP	Baldev Singh Deebu	942	0.97	New entry
Majority		28,503	29.34	
Turnout		97,152	70.14	
Registered electors		139,025		
