= Jagtar Singh =

Indian politician

MLA, Punjab Legislative Assembly
- Incumbent
- Assumed office 2022
- Preceded by: Amrik Singh Dhillon
- Constituency: Samrala
- Majority: Aam Aadmi Party

Personal details
- Party: Aam Aadmi Party

Jagtar Singh Diyalpura is an Indian politician and the MLA representing the Samrala Assembly constituency in the Punjab Legislative Assembly. He is a member of the Aam Aadmi Party. He was elected as the MLA in the 2022 Punjab Legislative Assembly election.

== Career ==
He has completed matriculation and traded in poultry and mushroom farming.

He entered politics and joined the Aam Aadmi Party. He contested the assembly election for the first time in 2022. He defeated the Sanyukt Samaj Morcha (SSM) president and its chief ministerial candidate Balbir Singh Rajewal and four-time sitting Congress MLA Amrik Singh Dhillon. The Aam Aadmi Party gained a strong 79% majority in the sixteenth Punjab Legislative Assembly by winning 92 out of 117 seats in the 2022 Punjab Legislative Assembly election. MP Bhagwant Mann was sworn in as Chief Minister on 16 March 2022.

== Member of Legislative Assembly ==
Diyalpura was elected as the MLA in the 2022 Punjab Legislative Assembly election. He represented the Samrala Assembly constituency in the Punjab Legislative Assembly.

Committee assignments of Punjab Legislative Assembly

- Member (2022–23) Committee on Estimates
- Member (2022–23) Committee on Co-operation and its allied activities

== Electoral performance ==
Punjab Assembly election, 2022: Samrala
Party	Candidate	Votes	%	±%
AAP	Jagtar Singh Diyalpura	57,557	43.11	
SAD	Paramjit Singh Dhillon	26,667	20.1	
INC	Rupinder Singh Raja Gill	23,368	17.6	
BJP	Ranjit Singh Gahlewal	2,331	1.8	
Majority		30,890	23.14	
Turnout		133,524	75.7	
Registered electors		175,822		

State Legislative Assembly
Preceded by Amrik Singh Dhillon	Member of the Punjab Legislative Assembly from Samrala Assembly constituency 2022 –	Incumbent
