= Amritsar South Assembly constituency =

Legislative Assembly constituency in Punjab State, India

Coordinates: 31.61°N 74.87°E

Amritsar South
- Constituency No. 19 for the Punjab Legislative Assembly

Constituency details
- Country: India
- State: Punjab
- District: Amritsar
- Lok Sabha constituency: Amritsar
- Total electors: 177,605 (in 2022)
- Reservation: None

Member of Legislative Assembly
- 16th Punjab Legislative Assembly
- Incumbent Inderbir Singh Nijjar
- Party: Aam Aadmi Party
- Elected year: 2022

Amritsar South Assembly constituency (Sl. No.: 19) is a Punjab Legislative Assembly constituency in Amritsar district, Punjab state, India.

== Members of the Legislative Assembly ==
Most successful parties from Amritsar South Vidhan Sabha
1. INC (4 Times) (28.6%)
2. SAD (4 Times) (28.6%)
3. JP (2 Times) (14.3%)
4. AAP (1 Time) (7.14%)
5. BJS (1 Time) (7.14%)
6. PSP (1 Time) (7.14%)
7. INC (I) (1 Time) (7.14%)

Year	Member	Party
1967	Harbans Lal Khanna	Bharatiya Jana Sangh
1969	Kirpal Singh	Praja Socialist Party
1972	Pirthipal Singh	Indian National Congress
1977	Kirpal Singh	Janata Party
1980	Pirthipal Singh	Indian National Congress (I)
1985	Kirpal Singh	Janata Party
1992	Maninderjit Singh	Indian National Congress
1997	Manjit Singh Calcutta	Shiromani Akali Dal
2002	Harjinder Singh Thekedar	Indian National Congress
2007	Raminder Singh Bolaria	Shiromani Akali Dal
2008^	Inderbir Singh Bolaria	Shiromani Akali Dal
2012	Inderbir Singh Bolaria	Shiromani Akali Dal
2017	Inderbir Singh Bolaria	Indian National Congress
2022	Inderbir Singh Nijjar	Aam Aadmi Party

== Election results ==
=== 2027 ===
Punjab Assembly election, 2027: Amritsar South
Party	Candidate	Votes	%	±%
AAP	Inderbir Singh Nijjar			
SAD	S. Surjit Singh Pehlwan			
INC				
BSP				
AD (WPD)				New entry
BJP				New entry
NOTA	None of the above			
Majority				
Turnout				

=== 2022 ===
Punjab Assembly Election, 2022: Amritsar South
Party	Candidate	Votes	%	±%
AAP	Inderbir Singh Nijjar	53,053	50.1	
SAD	Talbir Singh Gill	25,550	24.13	
INC	Inderbir Singh Bolaria	22,467	21.22	
PLC	Harjinder Singh Thekedar	1566	1.48	
NOTA	None of the above	632	0.6	
Majority		27503	25.97	
Turnout		1,05,885	59.6	
Registered electors		177,605		

=== 2017 ===
Punjab Assembly election, 2017: Amritsar South
Party	Candidate	Votes	%	±%
INC	Inderbir Singh Bolaria	47,581	50.96	
AAP	Inderbir Singh Nijjar	24923	26.7	
SAD	Gurpartap Singh Tikka	16596	17.78	
IND	Maninder Pal Singh Palasour	1343	1.44	
CPI	Lakhwinder Singh	726	0.78	
BSP	Sushil Kumar	446	0.48	
NOTA	None of the above	723	0.77	
Registered electors		148,809		

=== Previous Results ===
Year	A C No.	Name	Party	Votes	Runner Up	Party	Votes
2012	19	Inderbir Singh Bolaria	SAD	48310	Jasbir Singh Gill (Dimpa)	INC	33254
2008	18 (by poll)	Inder Bir Singh Bolari	SAD	43495	Navdeep Singh Goldy	INC	21262
2007	18	Raminder Singh Bolaria	SAD	54632	Harjinder Singh Thekedar	INC	30624
2002	19	Harjinder Singh Thekedar	INC	23322	Raminder Singh Bolaria	IND	19232
1997	19	Manjit Singh Calcutta	SAD	31060	Harjinder Singh Thekedar	INC	16565
1992	19	Maninderjit Singh	INC	19451	Raj Kumar	BJP	7461
1985	19	Kirpal Singh	JNP	28482	Pirthi Pal Singh	INC	19222
1980	19	Pirthipal Singh	INC(I)	27286	Kirpal Singh	JNP(JP)	25525
1977	19	Kirpal Singh	JNP	32443	Pirthipal Singh	INC	20514
1972	24	Pirthipal Singh	INC	16399	Kirpal Singh	SOP	14237
1969	24	Kirpal Singh	PSP	20282	Harbans Lal	BJS	15650
1967	24	H. Lal	BJS	17023	K. Singh	PSP	16320
