= Nand Lal (Shiromani Akali Dal politician) =

Indian politician (died 2019)

Member of the Punjab Legislative Assembly
- In office 1997–2017
- Preceded by: Hargopal Singh
- Succeeded by: Chaudhary Darshan Lal
- Constituency: Balachaur

Personal details
- Died: April 14, 2019
- Party: Shiromani Akali Dal
- Occupation: Politician

Chaudhary Nand Lal (1944/51 – 14 April 2019) was an Indian politician from the state of Punjab. Lal represented the Balachaur Assembly Constituency of Punjab and was a four-term (1997–2017) member of the Punjab Legislative Assembly. Lal was a member of the Shiromani Akali Dal party.

== Political career ==
Nand Lal first contested the elections from Balachaur constituency for the Punjab Legislative Assembly in 1992 but was defeated by Hargopal Singh of the BSP. He finished second and received more votes than the incumbent of the INC.

In 1997, Chaudhary Nand Lal was allotted the ticket to contest Balachaur on the Shiromani Akali Dal ticket. He won the election and went on to retain the seat in 1997, 2002, 2007 and 2012.

Nand Lal lost his seat in the 2017 elections to INC candidate Darshan Lal Mangupur but finished second and ahead of Brigadier Raj Kumar, the AAP candidate.

He died of cancer on 14 April 2019 at the age of 74.

== Life ==
Chaudhary Nand Lal was born to Mr. Lachman Das in an influential Gujjar family.
