= Jalandhar North Assembly constituency =

Legislative Assembly constituency in Punjab State, India

Coordinates: 31.36°N 75.58°E

Jalandhar North
- Constituency No. 36 for the Punjab Legislative Assembly

Constituency details
- Country: India
- State: Punjab
- District: Jalandhar
- Lok Sabha constituency: Jalandhar
- Total electors: 192,058 (in 2022)
- Reservation: None

Member of Legislative Assembly
- 16th Punjab Legislative Assembly
- Incumbent Avtar Singh Junior
- Party: Indian National Congress
- Elected year: 2022

Jalandhar North Assembly constituency is one of the 117 Legislative Assembly constituencies of Punjab state in India. It is part of Jalandhar district.

== Members of the Legislative Assembly ==
Most successful parties from Jalandhar North Vidhan Sabha
1. INC (9 Times) (56.2%)
2. BJP (3 Times) (18.8%)
3. BJS (2 Times) (12.5%)
4. JP (1 Time) (6.25%)
5. INC (I) (1 Time) (6.25%)

Election	Name	Party
Jullundur City North East constituency
1952	Ram Kishan	Indian National Congress
1957	Lal Chand	Bharatiya Jana Sangh
1962	Ram Kishan	Indian National Congress
Jullundur North constituency
1967	Lal Chand Suberwal	Bharatiya Jana Sangh
1969	Gurdial Saini	Indian National Congress
1972	Gurdial Saini	Indian National Congress
1977	Ramesh Chander	Janata Party
1980	Gurdial Saini	Indian National Congress (Indira)
1985	Vaid Om Prakash Dutt	Bharatiya Janata Party
1992	Avtar singh Henry	Indian National Congress
1997	Avtar singh Henry	Indian National Congress
2002	Avtar singh Henry	Indian National Congress
2007	K. D. Bhandari	Bharatiya Janata Party
Jalandhar North constituency
2012	K. D. Bhandari	Bharatiya Janata Party
2017	Avtar Singh Junior	Indian National Congress
2022	Avtar Singh Junior	Indian National Congress

== Election results ==
=== 2027 ===
Punjab Assembly election, 2027: Jalandhar North
Party	Candidate	Votes	%	±%
AAP	Vaneet Dhir			
AD (WPD)				New entry
INC				
BSP				
SAD				New entry
BJP				
NOTA	None of the above			
Majority				
Turnout				

=== 2022 ===
Punjab Assembly election, 2022: Jalandhar North
Party	Candidate	Votes	%	±%
INC	Avtar Singh Junior	47,338	37.20	▼18.80
BJP	K. D. Bhandari	37,852	29.80	▼0.30
AAP	Dinesh Dhall	32,685	25.70	▲14.90
BSP	Kuldeep Singh Lubana	6,153	4.08	▲2.88
NOTA	None of the Above	950	0.5	
Majority		9,486	7.4	▼18.80
Turnout		128,158	66.70	▼5.5
Registered electors		192,160		
INC hold				

=== 2017 ===
Punjab Assembly election, 2017: Jalandhar North
Party	Candidate	Votes	%	±%
INC	Avtar Singh Junior	69,715	56.0	▲11.1
BJP	K. D. Bhandari	37,424	30.10	▼13.34
AAP	Gulshan Sharma	13,386	10.80	new
BSP	Hardwari Lal	1,506	1.2	▼5.4
NOTA	None of the Above	1,182	0.7	
Majority		32,291	26.20	▲24.7
Turnout		123,309	72.20	▼3.1
Registered electors		172,430		

=== 2012 ===
Punjab Assembly election, 2012: Jalandhar North
Party	Candidate	Votes	%	±%
BJP	K. D. Bhandari	52,198	44.90	▼5.4
INC	Avtar Henry	50,495	43.44	▼1.46
BSP	Hans Raj Rana	7,656	6.6	▲3.40
Independent	Dinesh Dhall	4,371	3.80	new
Majority		1,703	1.5	
Turnout		116,239	75.30	
Registered electors		154,382		

=== 2007 ===
Punjab Assembly election, 2007: Jalandhar North
Party	Candidate	Votes	%	±%
BJP	K. D. Bhandari	45,579	50.30	
INC	Avtar Henry	40,650	44.90	
BSP	Bachan Lal	2,892	3.2	
Majority		4,929	5.40	
Turnout		90,597	69.50	

== See also ==
- List of constituencies of the Punjab Legislative Assembly
- Jalandhar district
