= Simarjit Singh Bains =

Indian politician

Simarjeet Singh Bains

Member of the Punjab Legislative Assembly
- In office 2012 – 11 March 2022
- Succeeded by: Kulwant Singh Sidhu
- Constituency: Atam Nagar

Personal details
- Born: 28 January 1970 (age 56) Ludhiana, Punjab, India
- Party: Indian National Congress
- Other political affiliations: Lok Insaaf Party (2016—2022)
- Spouse: Smt. Surinder Kaur
- Parent(s): S. Mohan Singh and Smt. Kashmir Kaur
- Relatives: Balwinder Singh Bains (Brother)
- Occupation: Politician

Simarjeet Singh Bains is an Indian politician a former member of the Punjab Legislative Assembly.

== Political career ==
Between 2012 and 2022, Bains represented the Atam Nagar Assembly constituency of Punjab.

Simarjeet Bains started his career as an independent member of the Punjab Legislative Assembly. Along with his brother, Balwinder Singh Bains, he established the Lok Insaaf Party and made an alliance with the Aam Aadmi Party for the 2017 Punjab Legislative Assembly election.

Bains also contested as an independent candidate from Ludhiana in 2014 general elections and gathered 2,10,917 votes. They left the AAP alliance in March 2018 following AAP national convenor Arvind Kejriwal issuing a public apology to Bikram Singh Majithia, having earlier accused him of being the kingpin of the illegal drug trade in Punjab.

In December 2016, Bains and a group of men lifted the toll barrier at the Ladhowal Toll Plaza, allowing people to drive through the toll without paying.

In December 2018, Lok Insaaf Party along with Punjab Ekta Party, Bahujan Samaj Party and Punjab Front formed the Punjab Democratic Alliance, which contested the 2019 Indian general election in Punjab on all 13 Lok Sabha seats.

== Controversy ==
In September 2019, Bains was booked for intimidation and use of profanities against the Deputy Commissioner of Gurdaspur district. Various video clips that depict the choice of language adopted by Bains reveal the indecency in his behavior while dealing with respected government officials.

In April 2020, a Nihang Sikh chopped off the hand of a police officer on duty during the COVID-19 pandemic. Bains' initial reaction of supporting the perpetrator's actions caused disapproval not just in the ranks of Punjab Police but among general public as well. Amidst the discouraging and unthoughtful remarks of Bains, his security was temporarily withdrawn to make him a bit more empathetic towards police personnel - who were tolling day in and day out to keep the public safe while putting their own lives at risk during COVID pandemic.

== Personal life ==
Bains' brother Balwinder Singh Bains was an independent member of the Punjab Legislative Assembly between 2012–2022.
