= Inderbir Singh Nijjar =

Indian politician

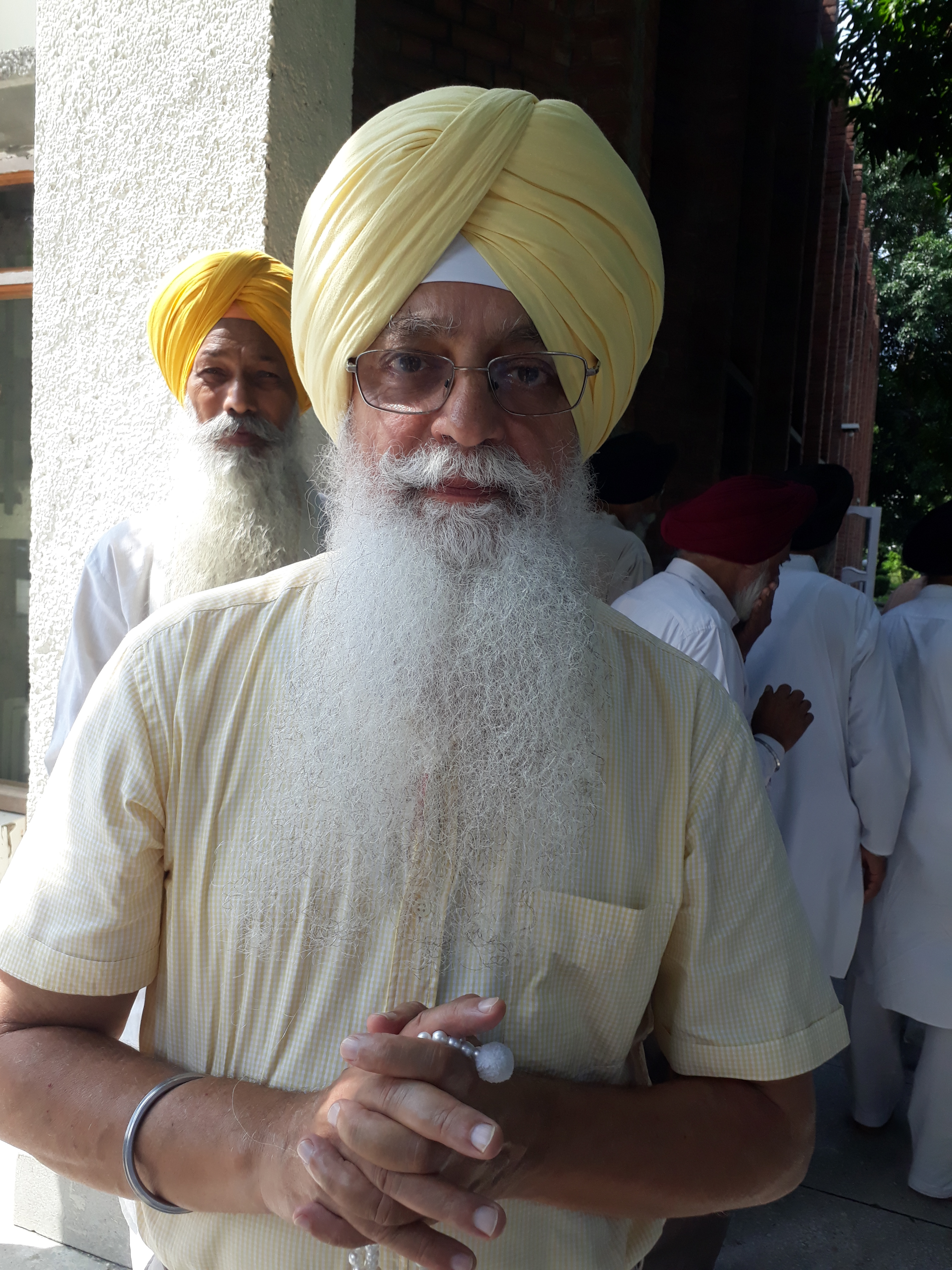
- Inderbir Singh Nijjar in 2022

Cabinet Minister, Government of Punjab
- In office 5 July 2022 – 31 May 2023
- Cabinet: Mann ministry
- Chief Minister: Bhagwant Mann
- Ministry and Departments: Local Government; Parliamentary Affairs; Conservation of Land and Water; Administrative Reforms
- Succeeded by: Balkar Singh

MLA, Punjab
- Incumbent
- Assumed office 2022
- Preceded by: Inderbir Singh Bolaria
- Constituency: Amritsar South
- Majority: Aam Aadmi Party

Personal details
- Born: Inderpreet Singh najjar Ajnala
- Party: Aam Aadmi Party
- Education: Post Graduate
- Alma mater: Government Medical College Amritsar
- Occupation: Politician
- Profession: Doctor(MD)
- Cabinet: Minister local bodies

Inderbir Singh Nijjar is an Indian politician and the MLA from Amritsar South Assembly constituency. He is current President of Chief Khalsa Diwan. He is a member of the Aam Aadmi Party. He is also elected as Pro tem Speaker of Punjab Legislative Assembly.

== MLA ==
The Aam Aadmi Party gained a strong 79% majority in the sixteenth Punjab Legislative Assembly by winning 92 out of 117 seats in the 2022 Punjab Legislative Assembly election. MP Bhagwant Mann was sworn in as Chief Minister on 16 March 2022. Nijjar was appointed the pro tem speaker of 16th Punjab legislative Assembly.

Committee assignments of Punjab Legislative Assembly

- Member (2022–23) House Committee
- Member (2022–23) Committee on Questions & References

== Cabinet Minister ==
5 MLAs including Inderbir Singh Nijjar were inducted into the cabinet and their swearing in ceremony took place on 4 July 2022. On 5 July, Bhagwant Mann announced the expansion of his cabinet of ministers with five new ministers to the departments of Punjab state government. Inderbir Singh Nijjar was among the inducted ministers and was given the charge of following departments.

- Local Government
- Parliamentary Affairs
- Conservation of Land and Water
- Administrative Reforms

== Assets and liabilities declared during elections ==
During the 2022 Punjab Legislative Assembly election, he declared Rs. 36,00,04,024 as an overall financial asset and Rs. 40,02,069 as financial liability.

== Electoral performance ==
Punjab Assembly election, 2017: Amritsar South
Party	Candidate	Votes	%	±%
INC	Inderbir Singh Bolaria	47,581	50.96	
AAP	Inderbir Singh Nijjar	24923	26.7	
SAD	Gurpartap Singh Tikka	16596	17.78	
Independent	Maninder Pal Singh Palasour	1343	1.44	
CPI	Lakhwinder Singh	726	0.78	
BSP	Sushil Kumar	446	0.48	
NOTA	None of the above	723	0.77	
Registered electors		148,809		

Punjab Assembly Election, 2022: Amritsar South
Party	Candidate	Votes	%	±%
AAP	Inderbir Singh Nijjar	53,053	50.1	
SAD	Talbir Singh Gill	25,550	24.13	
INC	Inderbir Singh Bolaria	22,467	21.22	
PLC	Harjinder Singh Thekedar	1566	1.48	
NOTA	None of the above	632	0.6	
Majority		27503	25.97	
Turnout		1,05,885	59.6	
Registered electors		177,605		

Political offices
Preceded by Bhagwant Mann	Punjab Cabinet minister for Local Government; 2022–present	Incumbent
Preceded by Bhagwant Mann	Punjab Cabinet minister for Parliamentary Affairs; 2022–present	Incumbent
Preceded by Bhagwant Mann	Punjab Cabinet minister for Conservation of Land and Water; 2022–present	Incumbent
Preceded by Bhagwant Mann	Punjab Cabinet minister for Administrative Reforms; 2022–present	Incumbent
State Legislative Assembly
Preceded by Inderbir Singh Bolaria	Member of the Punjab Legislative Assembly from Amritsar South Assembly constituency 2022 –	Incumbent
