= Shaminder Singh =

Indian politician

Shaminder Singh (1947–1991) was twice Member of Parliament from Faridkot district in Indian Punjab. During the militancy days, he was known for his independent spirit and boldly kept a respectable distance from Sant Jarnail Singh Bhindranwale which was appreciated as a dare-devil feat by the general public and largely and especially by the bureaucrats and the heavy-handed Punjab Police officers, who not only allowed but even encouraged him to openly carry an AK-47 on his person, turning him into a local version of self-styled sheriff let loose to up-keep law and order in the highly disturbed Punjab in those days of militancy.

== Assassination ==
On 18 June 1991, one of his own disciples and bodyguards, Gurmeet Singh, an alleged militant who was rescued by him from the hands of law, invited him to his neighborhood at Jodhu Colony in Muktsar to make a public speech as preparation for the coming general elections for the seat of MLA Muktsar. Gurmeet Singh had already buried a few sticks of dynamite near the microphone stand, exactly were the Bhai was supposed to stand, and as soon as he was on the spot, Gurmeet activated a 12-volt battery-powered circuit to detonate the explosives via underground wiring. .

Gurmeet Singh, who went underground after blowing up Bhai, was traced and shot dead by Bathinda police a few years later.

== Family ==
Bhai Harnirpal Singh "Kuku", his younger brother, later stepped into his shoes and managed to become MLA Muktsar. Younger and humble Bhai Kuku has little in common with his elder brother from political point of view. Presently Bhai Kuku is the General Secretary of Punjab Pradesh Congress Committee.
