= K. D. Bhandari =

Indian politician

Chief Parliamentary Secretary for Co-operation of Punjab
- Incumbent
- Assumed office 2012

Member of the Punjab Legislative Assembly
- In office 2007–2017
- Preceded by: Avtar Henry
- Succeeded by: Avtar Singh Junior
- Constituency: Jalandhar North

Personal details
- Born: Jalandhar
- Party: Bharatiya Janta Party

K. D. Bhandari is a businessman turned politician in India and belongs to the ruling Bharatiya Janta Party (BJP). He was a member of Punjab Legislative Assembly and represented Jalandhar North.

== Family ==
His father's name is Chanan Ram. He has 3 children.

== Career ==
Government.
