= Axis My India =

Indian market research and polling company

- Type: Private
- Industry: Market research, Opinion polling, data analytics
- Founded: 2013
- Founder: Pradeep Gupta
- Headquarters: Mumbai, Maharashtra, India
- Key people: Pradeep Gupta (Chairman and Managing Director)
- Services: Election surveys, Exit polls, consumer data intelligence
- Website: www.axismyindia.org

Axis My India is an Indian market research and consulting company specializing in opinion polling, election surveys, and data analytics. It is headquartered in Mumbai and is known for its election-related surveys, particularly in collaboration with media organizations such as the India Today Group.

== History ==
Axis My India was founded in 2013 by Pradeep Gupta as a data-driven research and consulting firm. The company initially focused on consumer insights and market research before expanding into political and electoral analysis.

It gained national prominence during the 2019 Indian general election, when its exit poll predictions were widely reported to be close to the final results.

== Methodology ==
Axis My India conducts large-scale, face-to-face surveys across rural and urban India. The company states that it uses booth-level sampling and extensive field networks to improve prediction accuracy.

== Election surveys ==
=== 2014 general election ===
Axis My India began gaining visibility through media collaborations during the 2014 Indian general election.

Axis My India – 2014 Lok Sabha Exit Poll
Election	Party/Alliance	Predicted seats	Actual seats	Remarks
2014 Indian general election	National Democratic Alliance	340 ± 15	336	Considered broadly accurate
2014 Indian general election	United Progressive Alliance	~70–90	60	Close range estimate

=== 2015–2017 state elections ===
The company conducted surveys in multiple state elections, contributing to its recognition as a polling agency.

Selected State Election Exit Polls (2015–2017)
Election	Party/Alliance	Predicted seats	Actual seats	Remarks
2015 Bihar Legislative Assembly election	National Democratic Alliance	90–110	58	Overestimated NDA
2015 Bihar Legislative Assembly election	Mahagathbandhan	130–150	178	Underestimated
2017 Uttar Pradesh Legislative Assembly election	Bharatiya Janata Party	251–279	312	Correct trend, underestimated magnitude
2017 Punjab Legislative Assembly election	Indian National Congress	62–71	77	Close prediction

=== 2019 general election ===
Axis My India received significant attention for its exit poll projections during the 2019 Indian general election, which were widely considered among the most accurate.

Axis My India – 2019 Lok Sabha Exit Poll
Election	Party/Alliance	Predicted seats	Actual seats	Remarks
2019 Indian general election	National Democratic Alliance	339–365	353	Highly accurate
2019 Indian general election	United Progressive Alliance	77–108	91	Within range
2019 Indian general election	Others	69–95	99	Slight deviation

=== 2019–2023 state elections ===
The firm continued conducting exit polls for major state elections including Uttar Pradesh, Punjab, and Gujarat, with varying levels of accuracy.

Selected State Election Exit Polls (2019–2023)
Election	Party/Alliance	Predicted seats	Actual seats	Remarks
2022 Uttar Pradesh Legislative Assembly election	Bharatiya Janata Party	288–326	273	Slight overestimation
2022 Uttar Pradesh Legislative Assembly election	Samajwadi Party	71–101	125	Underestimated opposition
2022 Punjab Legislative Assembly election	Aam Aadmi Party	76–90	92	Very close prediction
2022 Gujarat Legislative Assembly election	Bharatiya Janata Party	129–151	156	Underestimated scale of victory
2023 Madhya Pradesh Legislative Assembly election	Bharatiya Janata Party	140–162	163	Very accurate
2023 Rajasthan Legislative Assembly election	Indian National Congress	86–106	69	Incorrect winner prediction

=== 2024 general election ===
During the 2024 Indian general election, Axis My India’s exit poll projections received widespread attention but were also debated after differences with final results.

Axis My India – 2024 Lok Sabha Exit Poll
Election	Party/Alliance	Predicted seats	Actual seats	Remarks
2024 Indian general election	National Democratic Alliance	361–401	293	Significant overestimation
2024 Indian general election	INDIA bloc	131–166	234	Underestimated opposition
2024 Indian general election	Others	8–20	16	Within range

=== 2026 Kerala Legislative Assembly election ===
					Remark
	UDF	LDF	NDA	Others	Remark
AMI prediction	78-90	49-62	0-3	0	UDF majority
Actual result	102	35	3	0	Significant UDF majority

=== 2026 Tamil Nadu Legislative Assembly election ===
Axis My India's poll was notably the only one predicting that the TVK, a relatively new party in its debut election, would win the most seats rather than the more established Secular Progressive Alliance or AIADMK-led Alliance.

					Remark
	SPA	AIADMK+	TVK	Others	Remark
AMI prediction	92-110	22-32	98-120	0	Hung
Actual result	73	53	108	0	Hung

=== 2025 Delhi Legislative Assembly election ===
					Remark
	BJP	AAP	INC	Others	Remark
AMI prediction	45-55	10-15	0-1	0-1	BJP majority
Actual result	48	22	0	0	BJP majority

=== 2024 Maharashtra Legislative Assembly election ===
	MY				MVA				VBA	Others	Remark
	BJP	SHS	NCP	Others	INC	SHS(UBT)	NCP(SP)	Others	VBA	Others	Remark
AMI prediction	98-107	53-58	25-30	2-5	28-36	26-32	26-30	2-4	0	6-12	MY majority
AMI prediction	178-200				82-102				0	6-12	MY majority
Actual result	132	57	41	5	16	20	10	4	0	3	MY majority
Actual result	235				50				0	3	MY majority

=== 2022 Goa Legislative Assembly election ===
Polling agency						Lead	Remarks
Polling agency	NDA	UPA	AAP	AITC+	Others	Lead	Remarks
AMI prediction	14-18	15-20	0	2-5	0-4	0-6	Hung
Election results	20	12	2	2	4	8	NDA majority

=== 2022 Manipur Legislative Assembly election ===
Polling agency						Lead	Remarks
Polling agency	BJP	INC	NPP	NPF	Others	Lead	Remarks
India Today - Axis My India	33-43	4-8	4-8	4-8	0-7	25-39	BJP Majority
Election results	32	5	7	5	11	21	BJP majority

=== 2022 Punjab Legislative Assembly election ===
Polling agency						Lead	Remarks
Polling agency	UPA	AAP	SAD+	NDA	Others	Lead	Remarks
India today - Axis My India	19-31	76-90	7-11	1-4	0-2	55-71	AAP Majority
Election results	18	92	4	2	1	74	AAP Majority

=== 2022 Uttar Pradesh Legislative Assembly election ===
Polling agency						Lead	Remarks
Polling agency	NDA	SP+	BSP	UPA	Others	Lead	Remarks
India Today - Axis My India	288-326	71-101	3-9	1-3	2-3	187-255	NDA majority
Election results	273	125	1	2	2	178	NDA majority

=== 2022 Uttarakhand Legislative Assembly election ===
Polling agency					Lead	Remarks
Polling agency	NDA	UPA	AAP	Others	Lead	Remarks
India Today - Axis My India	36-46	20-30	4-9		6-26	BJP Majority
Election results	47	19	0	4	28	NDA majority

== Criticism and controversies ==
Axis My India has faced criticism regarding methodology and prediction accuracy, particularly when forecasts diverged from actual election results.

In 2024, scrutiny increased following discrepancies between projections and outcomes, contributing to broader discussions on transparency and regulation of polling agencies in India.

== Other activities ==
Apart from election surveys, Axis My India works in consumer data analytics and governance-related initiatives, including citizen feedback platforms.

== Clients ==
- India Today group
- TAM India
