= Avtar Singh Junior =

Indian politician from Punjab

Member of the Punjab Legislative Assembly
- Incumbent
- Assumed office 2017
- Preceded by: K. D. Bhandari
- Constituency: Jalandhar North

Personal details
- Born: 22 January 1979 (age 47)
- Party: INC
- Profession: Politician

Avtar Singh Junior (born 22 January 1979) is an Indian politician and a member of INC. In 2017, he was elected as the member of the Punjab Legislative Assembly from Jalandhar North.

== Career ==
He owns a transport company, the Kartar bus service Punjab. He is the son of Sh. Avtar Henry three time MLA from Jalandhar north and ex Cabinet minister.

== Member of Legislative Assembly ==
He won the Jalandhar North constituency on an INC ticket, he beat the member of the Punjab Legislative Assembly K. D. Bhandari of the BJP by over 32291 votes.

The Aam Aadmi Party gained a strong 79% majority in the sixteenth Punjab Legislative Assembly by winning 92 out of 117 seats in the 2022 Punjab Legislative Assembly election. MP Bhagwant Mann was sworn in as Chief Minister on 16 March 2022.

Committee assignments of Punjab Legislative Assembly

- Member (2022–23) Committee on Subordinate Legislation

== Electoral performance ==
Punjab Assembly election, 2017: Jalandhar North
Party	Candidate	Votes	%	±%
INC	Avtar Singh Junior	69,715	56.0	▲11.1
BJP	K. D. Bhandari	37,424	30.10	▼13.34
AAP	Gulshan Sharma	13,386	10.80	new
BSP	Hardwari Lal	1,506	1.2	▼5.4
NOTA	None of the Above	1,182	0.7	
Majority		32,291	26.20	▲24.7
Turnout		123,309	72.20	▼3.1
Registered electors		172,430		

Punjab Assembly election, 2022: Jalandhar North
Party	Candidate	Votes	%	±%
INC	Avtar Singh Junior	47,338	37.20	▼18.80
BJP	K. D. Bhandari	37,852	29.80	▼0.30
AAP	Dinesh Dhall	32,685	25.70	▲14.90
BSP	Kuldeep Singh Lubana	6,153	4.08	▲2.88
NOTA	None of the Above	950	0.5	
Majority		9,486	7.4	▼18.80
Turnout		128,158	66.70	▼5.5
Registered electors		192,160		
INC hold				
