= Balachaur Assembly constituency =

Legislative Assembly constituency in Punjab State, India

Coordinates: 31.06°N 76.30°E

Balachaur
- Constituency No. 48 for the Punjab Legislative Assembly

Constituency details
- Country: India
- State: Punjab
- District: Nawan Shahr
- Lok Sabha constituency: Anandpur Sahib
- Total electors: 155,145 (in 2022)
- Reservation: None

Member of Legislative Assembly
- 16th Punjab Legislative Assembly
- Incumbent Santosh Kataria
- Party: Aam Aadmi Party
- Elected year: 2022

Balachaur Assembly constituency (Sl. No.: 48) is a Punjab Legislative Assembly constituency in Shahid Bhagat Singh Nagar district, Punjab state, India.

== Members of the Legislative Assembly ==
Most successful parties from Balachaur Vidhan Sabha
1. INC (4 Times) (28.6%)
2. SAD (4 Times) (28.6%)
3. IND (2 Times) (14.3%)
4. AAP (1 Time) (7.14%)
5. BSP (1 Time) (7.14%)
6. JP (1 Time) (7.14%)
7. INC (I) (1 Time) (7.14%)

Year	Member	Party
1951	Baloo Ram	Indian National Congress
Constituency defunct (1957-1967)
1967	Baloo Ram	Indian National Congress
1969	Tulsi Ram	Indian National Congress
1972	Dalip Chand	Independent
1977	Ram Kishan	Janata Party
1980	Dalip Chand	Indian National Congress (Indira)
1985	Ram Kishan	Independent
1992	Hargopal Singh	Bahujan Samaj Party
1997	Chaudhary Nand Lal	Shiromani Akali Dal
2002	Chaudhary Nand Lal	Shiromani Akali Dal
2007	Chaudhary Nand Lal	Shiromani Akali Dal
2012	Chaudhary Nand Lal	Shiromani Akali Dal
2017	Darshan Lal	Indian National Congress
2022	Santosh Kumari Katariaa	Aam Aadmi Party

== Election results ==
=== 2027 ===
Punjab Assembly election, 2027: Balachaur
Party	Candidate	Votes	%	±%
AAP	Santosh Kumari Kataria			
AD (WPD)				New entry
INC				
BSP				
SAD				
BJP				
NOTA	None of the above			
Majority				
Turnout				

=== 2022 ===
Punjab Assembly election, 2022: Balachaur
Party	Candidate	Votes	%	±%
AAP	Santosh Kumari Kataria	39,633	34.47	
SAD	Sunita Chaudhary	35,092	30.52	
INC	Chaudhary Darshan Lal	31,201	27.14	
BJP	Ashok Baath	5,566	4.84	New
NOTA	None of the above	679	0.40	
Majority		4,541	3.9	
Turnout		114,964	73.6	
Registered electors		156,211		

=== 2017 ===
Punjab Assembly election, 2017: Balachaur
Party	Candidate	Votes	%	±%
INC	Chaudhary Darshan Lal	49,558	42.21	
SAD	Chaudhary Nand Lal	29,918	25.48	
AAP	Brigadier Raj Kumar	21,656	18.44	
BSP	Baljit Singh	12,372	10.54	
CPI(M)	Paramjit Singh	1,176	1	
APP	Jarnail Singh	662	10.56	
NOTA	None of the above	877	0.75	
Majority		4,541	3.95	
Registered electors		148,292		

=== Previous Results ===
Year	A C No.	Name	Party	Votes	Runner Up	Party	Votes
2012	48	Chaudhary Nand Lal	SAD	36800	Shiv Ram Singh	BSP	21943
2007	43	Chaudhary Nand Lal	SAD	41206	Santosh Kumari	INC	40105
2002	44	Chaudhary Nand Lal	SAD	33629	Ram Kishan Kataria	INC	23286
1997	44	Chaudhary Nand Lal	SAD	42403	Hargopal Singh	BSP	21881
1992	44	Hargopal Singh	BSP	15696	Chaudhary Nand Lal	IND	12468
1985	44	Ram Kishan	IND	21740	Tulsi Ram	IND	14747
1980	44	Dalip Chand	INC(I)	26072	Ram Kishan Kataria	JNP (JP)	16139
1977	44	Ram Kishan	JNP	11344	Tulsi Ram	IND	10659
1972	39	Dalip Chand	IND	24722	Tulsi Ram	INC	23531
1969	39	Tulsi Ram	INC	25895	Gurbakhash Singh	SWA	17308
1967	39	Baloo Ram	INC	20687	Dalip Chand	IND	19466
1951	58	Baloo Ram	INC	22786	Kartar Singh	IND	11161
