= Khushhal Bahl =

Indian politician

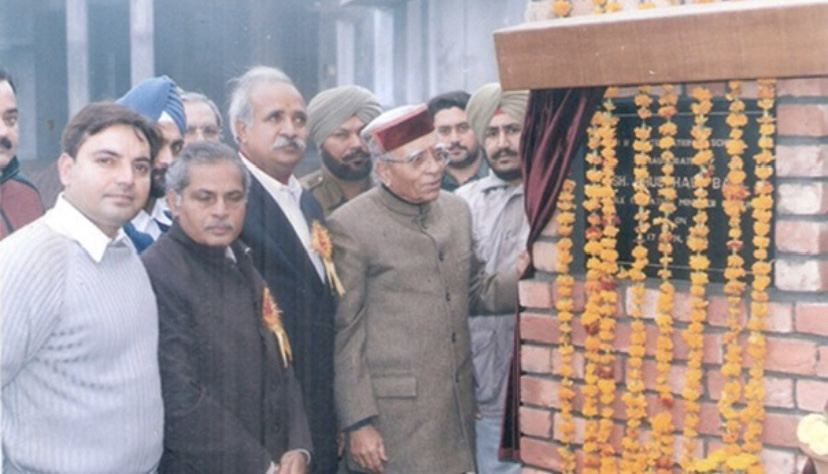

President of the Gurdaspur Municipal Council
- Incumbent
- Assumed office 1966

Deputy Minister for Cottage Industry
- In office 1973–1977

Member of Legislative Assembly
- In office 1972–1980
- Preceded by: Constituency Established
- Succeeded by: Rattan Lal
- Constituency: Gurudaspur
- In office 1992–1997
- Preceded by: Susheel
- Succeeded by: Kartar Singh Pahra
- Constituency: Gurudaspur
- In office 2002–2007
- Preceded by: Kartar Singh Pahra
- Succeeded by: Gurbachan Singh Babbehali
- Constituency: Gurudaspur

Cabinet Minister for Higher Education, Languages, Secondary & Primary Education
- In office 2002–2007

Personal details
- Born: 11 November 1927 Gurdaspur, Punjab, British India
- Died: 14 June 2014 (aged 86) Gurdaspur, Punjab, India
- Party: Indian National Congress
- Children: 3
- Education: Forman Christian College; Punjab University Hoshiarpur and Delhi
- Occupation: Politician

Khushhal Bahl (11 November 1927 – 14 June 2014) was an Indian politician who served as a Member of Punjab Legislative Assembly representing Gurdaspur in 1972, 1977, 1992, and 2002 and as Cabinet Minister in various Governments of Punjab. He was affiliated with the Indian National Congress.

== Early life and education ==
Khushhal Bahl was born on 11 November 1927, in Gurdaspur. He did his schooling from Gurdaspur, graduated from FC College Lahore, and obtained an MA in English from Punjab University Hoshiarpur and Delhi. He initiated his political journey as a student leader at FC College, Lahore. In 1966, he was elected president of the Gurdaspur municipal council.

== Political career ==
Khushhal Bahl served as MLA from the Gurdaspur Vidhan Sabha Constituency. He was elected in 1972, 1977, 1992, and 2002. He was Deputy Minister for Cottage Industry (1973–1977), Cabinet Minister for Labour & Employment and Legislative Affairs (1996), and Cabinet Minister of Punjab for Higher Education, Languages, Secondary & Primary Education (2002). Additionally, he chaired and participated in numerous committees of the Punjab Vidhan Sabha.

== Death ==
Khushhal Bahl died at his residence in Gurdaspur due to cardiac arrest on 14 June 2014. He was 87 years old.
