= Barindermeet Singh Pahra =

Indian politician

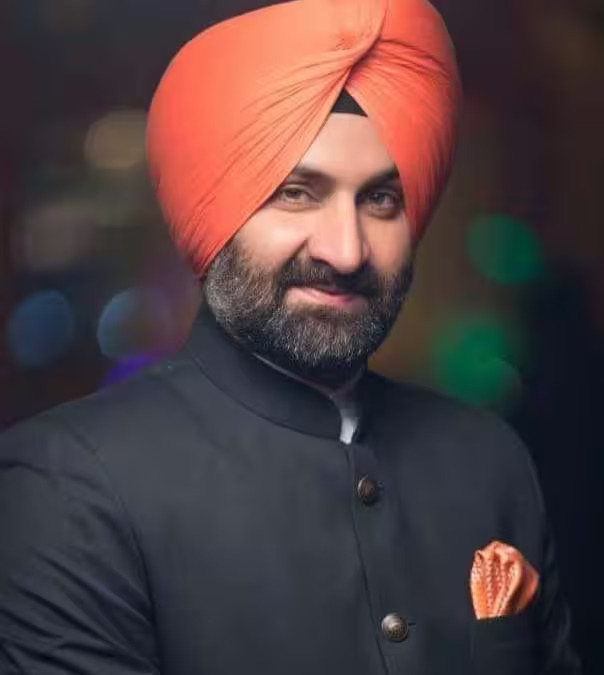

Member of Punjab Legislative Assembly
- Incumbent
- Assumed office 2017
- Preceded by: Gurbachan Singh Babbehali
- Constituency: Gurdaspur

Personal details
- Born: 8 January 1981 (age 45)
- Party: INC
- Profession: Politician

Barindermeet Singh Pahra (born 8 January 1981) is an Indian politician and a member of INC. In 2017, he was elected as the member of the Punjab Legislative Assembly from Gurdaspur.

== Constituency ==
Singh Pahra represents the Gurdaspur. Singh Pahra won the Gurdaspur on an INC ticket, Singh Pahra beat the member of the Punjab Legislative Assembly Gurbachan Singh Babbehali of the SAD by over 28956 votes.

== Political Party ==
Singh Pahra is from the INC and he is also the MLA of Gurdaspur.

== Assets and liabilities declared during elections ==
During the 2022 Punjab Legislative Assembly election, he declared Rs. 1,85,28,272 as an overall financial asset and Rs. 85,95,085 as financial liability.

== MLA ==
The Aam Aadmi Party gained a strong 79% majority in the sixteenth Punjab Legislative Assembly by winning 92 out of 117 seats in the 2022 Punjab Legislative Assembly election. MP Bhagwant Mann was sworn in as Chief Minister on 16 March 2022.

Committee assignments of Punjab Legislative Assembly

- Member (2022–23) Committee on Estimates

== Electoral performance ==
Punjab Assembly election, 2017: Gurudaspur
Party	Candidate	Votes	%	±%
INC	Barindermeet Singh Pahra	67,709	57.97	▲21.33
SAD	Gurbachan Singh Babbehali	38,753	33.18	▼24.07
AAP	Amarjit Singh Chahal	6,949	5.95	new
NOTA	None of the above	593	0.51	−−
Majority		28,956	24.88	
Turnout		117,390	75.60	▲0.88
Registered electors		152,519		
INC gain from SAD		Swing		

Punjab Assembly election, 2022: Gurudaspur
Party	Candidate	Votes	%	±%
INC	Barindermeet Singh Pahra	43,743	35.23	▼22.74
SAD	Gurbachan Singh Babbehali	36,408	29.33	▼3.85
AAP	Raman Bahl	29,500	23.76	▲17.81
BJP	Parminder Singh Gill	9,819	7.91	New
SSP	Inderpal Singh	2,391	1.93	New
NOTA	None of the above	699	0.56	▲0.05
Majority		7,335	5.90	
Turnout		124,152		
Registered electors		169,628		
INC hold		Swing		
