= Punjab Democratic Alliance =

2019 electoral alliance in Punjab, India

- Abbreviation: PDA
- Founder: Punjab Ekta Party, Bahujan Samaj Party, Lok Insaaf Party and Punjab Front
- Founded: 16 December 2018
- Dissolved: 9 January 2022

Punjab Democratic Alliance was formed by Punjab Ekta Party leader Sukhpal Singh Khaira to contest 2019 Indian general election in Punjab on all 13 Lok Sabha seats. PDA was part of the nationwide Mahagathbandhan, and projected Mayawati as its prime ministerial face.

== Campaign ==
On 12 May 2019, BSP-PDA held a massive rally at Langroya village, Nawanshahr and BSP national president Mayawati campaigned for all 13 PDA candidates of Punjab including Sukhpal Singh Khaira and Simarjit Singh Bains alongside BSP candidates former journalist Balwinder Kumar from Jalandhar, retired IAS officer Khushi Ram from Hoshiarpur and international polo player Vikram Singh Sodhi from Anandpur Sahib. Mayawati attacked SAD-BJP and Congress in her speech for failing people of Punjab. Communist leaders Mangat Ram Pasla from the Revolutionary Marxist Party of India (RMPI), Bant Brar from the CPI and Kiranjit Singh Sekhon from the MCPI (U) were also speakers at rally.

== Members ==
Following were the members of alliance:

Party	Leader
National Political Parties
Communist Party of India	Bant Singh Brar
Unrecognized Regional Parties
Lok Insaaf Party	Simarjit Singh Bains
Nawan Punjab Party	Dharamvir Gandhi
Revolutionary Marxist Party of India	Mangat Ram Pasla

- Former members
  - Shiromani Akali Dal (Taksali). On 2 March 2019 SAD(T) formed coalition with AAP.
  - Bahujan Samaj Party one of the Prominent member of PDA announced its alliance with Shiromani Akali Dal on 12 June 2021.
  - After BSP another setback to PDA when Punjab Ekta Party merged with Indian National Congress on 17 June 2021.

== Lok Sabha election 2019 ==
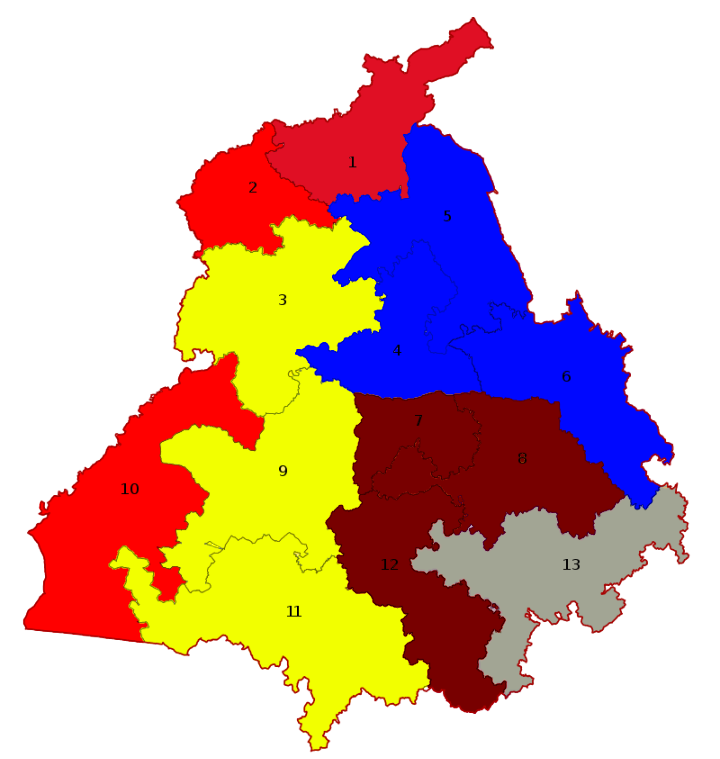
Initially Amritsar seat was given to Lok Insaaf Party but later decided to give it to CPI. Alliance announced to contest on all 13 Lok Sabha seats in Punjab.

Party	No. of seats contested	Contested seats (seat no.)	Result (won/lost)	Vote % in seats contested	Total vote share
Lok Insaaf Party	3	Sangrur (12)	Lost	1.82	3.45%
Lok Insaaf Party	3	Ludhiana (7)	Lost	29.36	3.45%
Lok Insaaf Party	3	Fatehgarh Sahib (8)	Lost	14.43	3.45%
Bahujan Samaj Party	3	Anandpur Sahib (6)	Lost	13.54	3.52%
Bahujan Samaj Party	3	Jalandhar (4)	Lost	20.1	3.52%
Bahujan Samaj Party	3	Hoshiarpur (5)	Lost	12.98	3.52%
Punjab Ekta Party	3				
Punjab Ekta Party	3	Bathinda (11)	Lost	3.18	2.18%
Punjab Ekta Party	3	Faridkot (9)	Lost	4.51	2.18%
Punjab Ekta Party	3	Khadoor Sahib (3)	Lost	20.51	2.18%
Communist Party of India	2				2.18%
Communist Party of India	2	Amritsar (2)	Lost	1.9	0.31%
Communist Party of India	2	Firozpur (10)	Lost	2.23	0.31%
Nawan Punjab Party	1	Patiala (13)	Lost	13.72	1.19%
Revolutionary Marxist Party of India	1	Gurdaspur (1)	Lost	1.38	0.11%
TOTAL	13		0	10.76%	
