= Balwinder Singh Bains =

Indian politician

Member of Punjab Legislative Assembly
- In office 2012–2022
- Preceded by: new constituency after 2008 delimitation
- Succeeded by: Rajinder Pal Kaur (AAP)
- Constituency: Ludhiana South Assembly constituency

Personal details
- Born: 12 March 1959 (67 years age) Ludhiana
- Party: Indian National Congress
- Relations: Simarjit Singh Bains (brother)
- Parent(s): S. Mohan Singh and Smt. Kashmir Kaur
- Occupation: Politician

Balwinder Singh Bains is an Indian politician from the state of Punjab and a former member of the Punjab Legislative Assembly.

== Political career ==
In 2012 he contested as an independent candidate and won the election. In 2016 along with his brother Simarjit Singh Bains he formed Lok Insaaf Party.

== Member of Legislative Assembly ==
Between 2012 and 2022, as Member of the Legislative Assembly, Bains represented the Ludhiana South Assembly constituency of Punjab. In 2022 Punjab Legislative Assembly election he contested from his constituency Ludhiana South Assembly constituency and was defeated by Rajinder Pal Kaur of Aam Aadmi Party. Bains received 11.29% of the total votes polled and came on fourth position behind AAP, BJP and INC.

== Personal life ==
Bains's brother Simarjit Singh Bains is also a Lok Insaaf Party member of the Punjab Legislative Assembly.

State Legislative Assembly
New seat	Member of the Punjab Legislative Assembly from Ludhiana South Assembly constituency 2012 – 2022	Succeeded by Rajinder Pal Kaur (AAP)
