= Inderbir Singh Bolaria =

Indian politician

MLA, Punjab
- In office 2008 - 2022
- Preceded by: Raminder Singh Bolaria
- Succeeded by: Inderbir Singh Nijjar
- Constituency: Amritsar South

Personal details
- Party: Indian National Congress
- Spouse: Geetinder Kaur Bolaria
- Website: www.facebook.com/inderbirsinghbolaria

Inderbir Singh Bolaria is an Indian politician and belongs to Indian national congress. He is a Chief Parliamentary Secretary (Education) of Punjab and member of Punjab Legislative Assembly and represents Amritsar South.

== Family ==
He is son of Raminder Singh Bolaria, a former MLA from Amritsar South.

== Political career ==
Bolaria was elected to Punjab Legislative Assembly in Amritsar South constituency by-election in 2008, which was vacated due to death of sitting MLA and his father Raminder Singh Bolaria. He was re-elected as MLA from this constituency in 2012 and Punjab Government made him a Chief Parliamentary Secretary (Education) of Punjab. He was re-elected in 2012. Bolaria was one of the 42 INC MLAs who submitted their resignation in protest of a decision of the Supreme Court of India ruling Punjab's termination of the Sutlej-Yamuna Link (SYL) water canal unconstitutional.

== Electoral performance ==
Punjab Assembly election, 2017: Amritsar South
Party	Candidate	Votes	%	±%
INC	Inderbir Singh Bolaria	47,581	50.96	
AAP	Inderbir Singh Nijjar	24923	26.7	
SAD	Gurpartap Singh Tikka	16596	17.78	
Independent	Maninder Pal Singh Palasour	1343	1.44	
CPI	Lakhwinder Singh	726	0.78	
BSP	Sushil Kumar	446	0.48	
NOTA	None of the above	723	0.77	
Registered electors		148,809		

Punjab Assembly Election, 2022: Amritsar South
Party	Candidate	Votes	%	±%
AAP	Inderbir Singh Nijjar	53,053	50.1	
SAD	Talbir Singh Gill	25,550	24.13	
INC	Inderbir Singh Bolaria	22,467	21.22	
PLC	Harjinder Singh Thekedar	1566	1.48	
NOTA	None of the above	632	0.6	
Majority		27503	25.97	
Turnout		1,05,885	59.6	
Registered electors		177,605		
