= Gurbachan Singh Babbehali =

Indian politician

MLA, Punjab
- In office 2007 - 2017
- Preceded by: Khushhal Bahl
- Succeeded by: Barindermeet Singh Pahra
- Constituency: Gurdaspur

Personal details
- Party: Shiromani Akali Dal

Gurbachan Singh Babbehali is an Indian politician and belongs to the ruling Shiromani Akali Dal. He was member of Punjab Legislative Assembly and represents Gurdaspur.

== Political career ==
The son of Moninder Singh, he was elected to the Punjab Legislative Assembly in 2007 from Gurdaspur. He was re-elected in 2012.

He is Chief Parliamentary Secretary in the current Punjab Government.

== Electoral performance ==
Punjab Assembly election, 2022: Gurudaspur
Party	Candidate	Votes	%	±%
INC	Barindermeet Singh Pahra	43,743	35.23	▼22.74
SAD	Gurbachan Singh Babbehali	36,408	29.33	▼3.85
AAP	Raman Bahl	29,500	23.76	▲17.81
BJP	Parminder Singh Gill	9,819	7.91	New
SSP	Inderpal Singh	2,391	1.93	New
NOTA	None of the above	699	0.56	▲0.05
Majority		7,335	5.90	
Turnout		124,152		
Registered electors		169,628		
INC hold		Swing		

Punjab Assembly election, 2017: Gurudaspur
Party	Candidate	Votes	%	±%
INC	Barindermeet Singh Pahra	67,709	57.97	▲21.33
SAD	Gurbachan Singh Babbehali	38,753	33.18	▼24.07
AAP	Amarjit Singh Chahal	6,949	5.95	new
NOTA	None of the above	593	0.51	−−
Majority		28,956	24.88	
Turnout		117,390	75.60	▲0.88
Registered electors		152,519		
INC gain from SAD		Swing		

Punjab Assembly election, 2012: Gurudaspur
Party	Candidate	Votes	%	±%
SAD	Gurbachan Singh Babbehali	59,905	57.25	▲7.57
INC	Raman Bahl	38,335	36.64	▼8.85
Majority		19,570	18.70	
Turnout		104,629	74.72	▲1.20
SAD hold		Swing		

Punjab Assembly election, 2007: Gurudaspur
Party	Candidate	Votes	%	±%
SAD	Gurbachan Singh Babbehali	51,446	49.68	▲20.02
INC	Pritam Singh Bhinder	47,109	45.49	▲1.23
Majority		4,337	4.18	
Turnout		103,540	73.52	▲7.97
SAD gain from INC		Swing		
