= Harnirpal Singh =

Bhai Harnirpal Singh a.k.a. "Kuku", former MLA of Muktsar constituency, is the younger brother and political heir to the late Bhai Shaminder Singh. He is a member of Indian National Congress and was appointed an executive member of Punjab Pradesh Congress Committee (PPCC) and Member of the National Executive, Jatt Mahasabha by Captain Amarinder Singh, (President, PPCC).

He is appointed the General Seceretary, Punjab Pradesh Congress Committee (PPCC).
