= Lok Insaaf Party =

- Abbreviation: LIP
- President: Simarjit Singh Bains
- Chairman: Balwinder Singh Bains
- Founded: 28 October 2016 (9 years, 297 days ago)
- Merged into: Indian National Congress
- Alliance: AAP (2016-2018); PDA (2018-2022)
- Seats in Rajya Sabha: 0 / 245
- Seats in Lok Sabha: 0/543
- Seats in Punjab Legislative Assembly: 0 / 117

Lok Insaaf Party (LIP; lit. 'People's Justice Party') was founded in 2016 by Simarjit Singh Bains.

It contested 2017 Punjab Legislative Assembly election on five seats in alliance with Aam Aadmi Party. In 2022 Punjab Legislative Assembly election it failed to win any seats.

== 2017 Punjab assembly election ==
LIP contested 2017 Punjab assembly election on five seats. It formed coalition with Aam Aadmi Party. Party able to get only two seats out of five. It got 26.46% votes in five seats but 1.22% overall votes. Simarjit Singh Bains won Atam Nagar Assembly Constituency and Balwinder Singh Bains won the Ludhiana South Assembly Constituency.

== 2019 general election ==
In the 2019 Indian general election, the party contested on three Lok Sabha seats in Punjab as a member of Punjab Democratic Alliance; however, the party never won any seat. These were:

- Sangrur
- Ludhiana
- Fatehgarh Sahib
