= Amrik Singh Dhillon =

Indian politician

Amrik Singh Dhillon is a Punjabi Indian politician and former Member of the Punjab Legislative Assembly for the constituency of Samrala, District Ludhiana. He has campaigned for office in Samrala five times and won four times. (1997, 2002, 2012 and 2017). He was a member of the Indian National Congress.

He also sits on and is a member of the following Punjab Government Committees:

- Committee on Public Accounts
- Committee on Government Assurances

In February 2022 he was ruled out of the party.. When INC announced Rupinder Singh Raja Gill as MLA face for 2022 elections, he decided to run for office as an independent.

When he failed to get seat, he joined Bharatiya Janata Party (BJP).
