= Hira Singh Gabria =

Indian politician

Member of Legislative Assembly
- Constituency: Ludhiana

Cabinet Minister

Jail & Tourism Punjab
- In office 2007 - 2012

Personal details
- Born: Dec-15,1948 Ludhiana, Punjab
- Party: SAD
- Spouse: Salwinder Kaur Gabria
- Children: 2 daughters and 1 son (Rakhwinder Gabria)
- Parent: Gian Singh Gabria (father)

Hira Singh Gabria (Punjabi: ਹੀਰਾ ਸਿੰਘ ਗਾਬੜੀਆ, Urdu: ہیرا سينگہ گابڑژا) President of Shiromani Akali Dal BC wing. He was Jail & Tourism Minister in Punjab Government. He represents the Shiromani Akali Dal (Badal) political party.
