= Chaudhary Darshan Lal =

Indian politician

Member of the Punjab Legislative Assembly
- In office 2017–2022
- Constituency: Balachaur Assembly constituency

Personal details
- Party: Indian National Congress
- Occupation: Politician

Chaudhary Darshan Lal is an Indian politician from the state of Punjab. Lal represents the Balachaur Assembly constituency of Punjab and is a member of the Punjab Legislative Assembly (2017–2022).

== Family ==
The son of Ram Chand, he was born 6 April 1950 in the village of Mangupur, Shaheed Bhagat Singh Nagar district, Punjab. He has three sons.

== Political career ==
He contested as a candidate of Peoples Party of Punjab in the Assembly election 2012 from constituency Balachaur and got approximately 19000 votes. He served as sarpanch of village Mangupur for two terms i.e. 10 years (1992-2002). He was elected to the Punjab Legislative Assembly elections in 2017 from Balachaur.
