= Aam Aadmi Party – Punjab =

State wing of political party in India

Aam Aadmi Party, Punjab
- Abbreviation: AAP
- Leader: Bhagwant Mann (CM of Punjab)
- President: Aman Arora
- Headquarters: Chandigarh
- Student wing: Chhatra Yuva Sangharsh Samiti (CYSS)
- Youth wing: AAP Youth Wing (AYW)
- Women's wing: AAP Mahila Shakti (AMS)
- Labour wing: Shramik Vikas Sangathan (SVS)
- Ideology: Punjabiyat; Secularism; Socialism; Developmentalism
- Colours: Blue Yellow
- ECI status: National Party
- Seats in Rajya Sabha: 1 / 7
- Seats in Lok Sabha: 3 / 13
- Seats in Punjab Legislative Assembly: 95 / 117

Election symbol
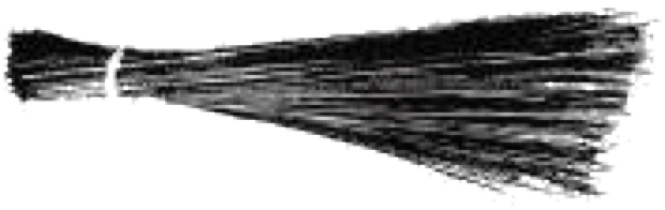
- Broom

Party flag
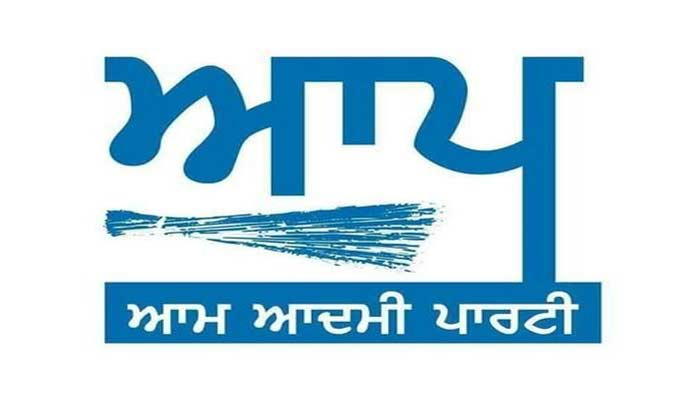

Website
- aamaadmiparty.org

The Aam Aadmi Party Punjab or AAP Punjab is the Punjab state wing of the Aam Aadmi Party and a recognised State party in Punjab. Currently, it is the governing party in the Punjab Legislative Assembly and has significant representation of the state in Rajya Sabha and Lok Sabha.

The AAP fielded 434 candidates in the 2014 Indian general election. In its debut in Punjab, four AAP candidates from Punjab won the election out of 13. Consequently, the AAP became a recognised state party in Punjab.

In the 2017 Punjab assembly election, the party formed an alliance with the Lok Insaaf Party giving it five seats. No CM candidate was declared before the elections. This AAP Alliance won 22 seats in total, two of which were won by the Lok Insaaf Party. AAP won 20 seats in the Punjab Assembly in its debut in the 2017 Punjab elections.

The AAP contested on all 117 seats in the 2022 Punjab Legislative Assembly election and won 92 seats, giving it a large majority. AAP MP Bhagwant Mann became the Chief Minister of Punjab.

== 2022 Rajya Sabha election ==
Former cricketer Harbhajan Singh, IIT professor Sandeep Pathak, educationist Ashok Kumar Mittal, industrialist Sanjeev Arora and Delhi MLA Raghav Chadha were nominated by AAP for a six year term in Rajya Sabha starting 2022. Six of its seven Rajya Sabha members joined the Bharatiya Janata Party in 2026..

== 2022 Punjab Legislative Assembly election ==
In January 2021 Arvind Kejriwal announced that AAP would be contesting in 2022 Punjab Legislative Assembly election. Raghav Chadha was appointed AAP Punjab co-in-charge for the Punjab election. On 18 January 2022 Bhagwant Mann was chosen as AAP's candidate for the post of Chief Minister of Punjab for the 2022 Punjab Legislative Assembly election. The selection was done by polling from the public. AAP did not have any alliance partner in this election.

In March 2021, Delhi CM Arvind Kejriwal held a Kisaan Mahapanchayat at Bagha Purana in Moga district and began campaigning for elections. On 28 June 2021, Kejriwal announced in a speech in Chandigarh that 300 units of free electricity would be provided to all Punjabis if the party wins the election. On 30 September 2021, Kejriwal also announced that if AAP wins the election, his government would build Mohalla Clinics in Punjab that would provide free healthcare facilities. On 22 November 2021, Arvind Kejriwal announced that if AAP wins Punjab then 1,000 rupees will be given to every women above 18 years of age. In the 2022 elections AAP registered a landslide victory. AAP contested on all 117 seats in the 2022 Punjab Legislative Assembly election and won 92 seats, giving it a large majority. AAP MP Bhagwant Mann became the CM of Punjab.

=== Candidates ===
CM candidate Bhagwant Mann contested from the Dhuri Assembly Constituency. Below is the full list of AAP candidates with the successful candidates marked in blue.

District	No.	Constituency	AAP Candidate
Pathankot	1	Sujanpur	Amit Singh Manto
Pathankot	2	Bhoa	Lal Chand Kataruchakk
Pathankot	3	Pathankot	Vibhuti Sharma
Gurdaspur	4	Gurdaspur	Raman Bahel
Gurdaspur	5	Dina Nagar	Shamsher Singh
Gurdaspur	6	Qadian	Jagroop Singh Shekhwan
Gurdaspur	7	Batala	Amansher Singh (Shery Kalsi)
Gurdaspur	8	Sri Hargobindpur	Amarpal Singh
Gurdaspur	9	Fatehgarh Churian	Balbir Singh Pannu
Gurdaspur	10	Dera Baba Nanak	Gurdeep Singh Randhawa
Amritsar	11	Ajnala	Kuldeep Dingh Dhaliwal
Amritsar	12	Rajasansi	Baldev Singh Meadian
Amritsar	13	Majitha	Sukhjinder Singh Lalli Majithia
Amritsar	14	Jandiala Guru	Harbhajan Singh E.T.O.
Amritsar	15	Amritsar North	Kunwar Vijay Pratap Singh
Amritsar	16	Amritsar West	Dr Jasbir Singh
Amritsar	17	Amritsar Central	Ajay Gupta
Amritsar	18	Amritsar East	Jeevanjot Kaur
Amritsar	19	Amritsar South	Dr. Inderbir Singh Nijjar
Amritsar	20	Attari	ADC Jaswinder Singh
Tarn Taran	21	Tarn Taran	Kashmir Singh Sohal
Tarn Taran	22	Khem Karan	Sarwan Singh Dhun
Tarn Taran	23	Patti	Laljit Singh Bhullar
Tarn Taran	24	Khadoor Sahib	Manjinder Singh Lalpura
Tarn Taran	25	Baba Bakala	Dalbir Singh Tong
Kapurthala	26	Bholath	Ranjeet Singh Rana
Kapurthala	27	Kapurthala	Manju Rana
Kapurthala	28	Sultanpur Lodhi	Sajjan Singh Cheema
Kapurthala	29	Phagwara	Joginder Singh Maan
Jalandhar	30	Phillaur	Prem Kumar
Jalandhar	31	Nakodar	Inderjit Kaur Mann
Jalandhar	32	Shahkot	Rattan Singh Kakarkalan
Jalandhar	33	Kartarpur	DCP Balkar Singh
Jalandhar	34	Jalandhar West	Sheetal Angural
Jalandhar	35	Jalandhar Central	Raman Arora
Jalandhar	36	Jalandhar North	Dinesh Dhal
Jalandhar	37	Jalandhar Cantonment	Surinder Singh Sodhi
Jalandhar	38	Adampur	Jeet Lal Bhaati
Hoshiarpur	39	Mukerian	Gurdhian Singh Multani
Hoshiarpur	40	Dasuya	Karamvir Singh Ghumman
Hoshiarpur	41	Urmar	Jasvir Singh Raja Gill
Hoshiarpur	42	Sham Chaurasi	Dr. Ravjot Singh
Hoshiarpur	43	Hoshiarpur	Pandit Brahm Shankar Jimpa
Hoshiarpur	44	Chabbewal	Harminder Singh Sandhu
Hoshiarpur	45	Garhshankar	Jai Kishan Singh Rori
S.B.S Nagar	46	Banga	Kuljit Singh Sarghal
S.B.S Nagar	47.	Nawan Shahr	Lalit Mohan Pathak
S.B.S Nagar	48.	Balachaur	Santosh Kataria
Rupnagar	49	Anandpur Sahib	Harjot Singh Bains
Rupnagar	50	Rupnagar	Dinesh Chadha
Rupnagar	51	Chamkaur sahib	Dr Charanjit Singh
S.A.S Nagar	52.	Kharar	Anmol Gagan Mann
S.A.S Nagar	53.	S.A.S. Nagar	Kulwant Singh
Fatehgarh	54.	Bassi Pathana	Rupinder Singh Happy
Fatehgarh	55.	Fatehgarh Sahib	Lakhbir Singh Rai
Fatehgarh	56.	Amloh	Gurinder Singh
Ludhiana	57.	Khanna	Tarunpreet Singh Sondh
Ludhiana	58.	Samrala	Jagtar Singh
Ludhiana	59.	Sahnewal	Hardeep Singh Mundian
Ludhiana	60.	Ludhiana East	Daljit Singh Grewal
Ludhiana	61.	Ludhiana South	Rajinder Pal Kaur Chhina
Ludhiana	62.	Atam Nagar	Kulwant Singh Sidhu
Ludhiana	63.	Ludhiana Central	Ashok Prashar (Pappi)
Ludhiana	64.	Ludhiana West	Gurpreet Singh Gogi
Ludhiana	65.	Ludhiana North	Madan Lal Bagga
Ludhiana	66.	Gill	Jiwan Singh Sangowal
Ludhiana	67.	Payal	Manwinder Singh Gyaspura
Ludhiana	68.	Dakha	KNS Kang
Ludhiana	69.	Raikot	Hakam Singh Thekedar
Ludhiana	70.	Jagraon	Saravjit Kaur Manuke
Moga	71.	Nihal Singh Wala	Manjit Singh Bilaspur
Moga	72.	Bhagha Purana	Amritpal Singh Sukhanand
Moga	73.	Moga	Dr. Amandeep Kaur Arora
Moga	74.	Dharamkot	Devinder Singh Laddi Dhos
Ferozpur	75.	Zira	Naresh Kataria
Ferozpur	76.	Firozpur City	Ranbir Bhullar
Ferozpur	77.	Firozpur Rural	Rajnish Dahiya
Ferozpur	78.	Guru Har Sahai	Fauja Singh Srari
Fazilka	79.	Jalalabad	Jagdeep 'Goldy' Kamboj
Fazilka	80.	Fazilka	Narinderpal Singh Sawna
Fazilka	81.	Abohar	Deep Kamboj
Fazilka	82.	Balluana	Amandeep Singh ‘Goldy’ Musafir
Sri Muktsar Sahib	83.	Lambi	Gurmeet Singh Khudian
Sri Muktsar Sahib	84.	Gidderbaha	Preetpal Sharma
Sri Muktsar Sahib	85.	Malout	Dr. Baljit Kaur
Sri Muktsar Sahib	86.	Muktsar	Jagdeep Singh Brar
Faridkot	87.	Faridkot	Gurdit Singh Sekhon
Faridkot	88.	Kotkapura	Kultar Singh Sandhwan
Faridkot	89.	Jaitu	Amolak Singh
Bathinda	90.	Rampura Phul	Balkar Singh Sidhu
Bathinda	91.	Bhucho Mandi	Master Jagsir Singh
Bathinda	92.	Bathinda Urban	Jagroop Singh Gill
Bathinda	93.	Bathinda Rural	Amit Rattan Kotfatta
Bathinda	94.	Talwandi Sabo	Baljinder Kaur
Bathinda	95.	Maur	Sukhvir Maiser Khana
Mansa	96.	Mansa	Vijay Singla
Mansa	97.	Sardulgarh	Gurpreet Singh Banawali
Mansa	98.	Budhlada	Budhram Singh
Sangrur	99.	Lehragaga	Barinder Kumar Goyal
Sangrur	100.	Dirba	Harpal Singh Cheema
Sangrur	101.	Sunam	Aman Arora
Barnala	102.	Bhadaur	Labh Singh Ugoke
Barnala	103.	Barnala	Gurmeet Singh Hayer
Barnala	104.	Mehal Kalan	Kulwant Singh Pandori
Malerkotla	105.	Malerkotla	Dr Mohd. Zamil-Ur-Rehman
Malerkotla	106.	Amargarh	Jaswant Singh Gajjanmajra
Sangrur	107.	Dhuri	Bhagwant Singh Mann
Sangrur	108.	Sangrur	Narinder Kaur Bharaj
Patiala	109.	Nabha	Gurdev Singh Dev Mann
Patiala	110.	Patiala Rural	Dr. Balbir Singh
Patiala	111.	Rajpura	Neena Mittal
S.A.S Nagar	112.	Dera Bassi	Kuljit Singh Randhawa
Patiala	113.	Ghanaur	Gurlal Ghanaur
Patiala	114.	Sanour	Harmeet Singh Pathanmajra
Patiala	115.	Patiala	Ajitpal Singh Kohli
Patiala	116.	Samana	Chetan Singh Jormajra
Patiala	117.	Shutrana	Kulwant Singh Bazigar

=== Leader in Legislative Houses ===
House	Leader	Portrait	Elected constituency	
House	Leader	Portrait	Constituency	State
Punjab Legislative Assembly	Bhagwant Mann		Dhuri	Punjab

== 2017 Punjab Legislative Assembly election ==
In December 2015, Aam Aadmi Party declared that it would contest the 2017 Punjab Legislative Assembly election. AAP which did not participate in the 2012 assembly election, but had fought 2014 Lok Sabha elections. Their 2014 General election performance translates to 33 assembly seats out of 117.

=== Alliance Partners ===
In the 2017 Punjab assembly election, the party formed a coalition with the Lok Insaaf Party and gave it five seats to contest. No CM candidate was declared before the elections. This alliance was called the AAP Alliance and was represented on news channels as AAP+. The alliance won 22 seats in total, two of which were won by the Lok Insaaf Party. AAP won 20 seats in the Punjab Assembly in its debut in the 2017 Punjab elections. In March 2018, the Lok Insaaf Party broke the coalition due to differences.

=== List of winning candidates and runner up candidates ===
District	AC No.	Constituency	Winner	Party	Votes	Runners-up	Party	Votes	Margin
Amritsar district	19	Amritsar South	Inderbir Singh Bolaria	INC	47581	Inderbir Singh Nijjar	AAP	24923	22658
Tarn Taran district	25	Baba Bakala (SC)	Santokh Singh	INC	45965	Dalbir Singh Tong	AAP	39378	6587
Kapurthala district	26	Bholath	Sukhpal Singh Khaira	AAP	48873	Yuvraj Bhupinder Singh	SAD	40671	8202
Jalandhar district	31	Nakodar	Gurpratap Singh Wadala	SAD	56241	Sarwan Singh Hayer	AAP	37834	18407
Hoshiarpur district	42	Sham Chaurasi (SC)	Pawan Kumar Adia	INC	46612	Dr. Ravjot Singh	AAP	42797	3815
Hoshiarpur district	45	Garhshankar	Jai Krishan	AAP	41720	Surinder Singh Heer	SAD	40070	1650
Nawanshahr District	46	Banga (SC)	Sukhwinder Kumar	SAD	45256	Harjot Singh Bains	AAP	43363	1893
Rupnagar district	50	Rupnagar	Amarjit Singh Sandoa	AAP	58994	Brinder Singh Dhillon	INC	35287	23707
Rupnagar district	51	Chamkaur Sahib (SC)	Charanjit Singh Channi	INC	61060	Charanjit Singh	AAP	48752	12308
Mohali district	52	Kharar	Kanwar Sandhu	AAP	54171	Jagmohan Singh Kang	INC	52159	2012
Mohali district	53	S.A.S.Nagar	Balbir Singh Sidhu	INC	66844	Narinder Singh	AAP	38971	27873
Fatehgarh Sahib district	54	Bassi Pathana (SC)	Gurpreet Singh	INC	47319	Santokh Singh	AAP	37273	10046
Ludhiana district	57	Khanna	Gurkirat Singh Kotli	INC	55690	Anil Dutt Phally	AAP	35099	20591
Ludhiana district	58	Samrala	Amrik Singh Dhillon	INC	51930	Sarbans Singh Manki	AAP	40925	11005
Ludhiana district	60	Ludhiana East	Sanjeev Talwar	INC	43010	Daljit Singh Grewal (Bhola)	AAP	41429	1581
Ludhiana district	61	Ludhiana South	Balvinder Singh Bains	LIP	53955	Bhupinder Singh Sidhu	INC	23038	30917
Ludhiana district	62	Atam Nagar	Simarjeet Singh Bains	LIP	53421	Kamal Jit Singh Karwal	INC	36508	16913
Ludhiana district	64	Ludhiana West	Bharat Bhushan Ashu	INC	66627	Ahbaab Singh Grewal	AAP	30106	36521
Ludhiana district	66	Gill (SC)	Kuldeep Singh Vaid	INC	67927	Jiwan Singh Sangowal	AAP	59286	8641
Ludhiana district	67	Payal (SC)	Lakhvir Singh Lakha	INC	57776	Gurpreet Singh Lapran	AAP	36280	21496
Ludhiana district	68	Dakha	Harvinder Singh Phoolka	AAP	58923	Manpreet Singh Ayali	SAD	54754	4169
Ludhiana district	69	Raikot (SC)	Jagtar Singh Jagga Hissowal	AAP	48245	Amar Singh	INC	37631	10614
Ludhiana district	70	Jagraon (SC)	Saravjit Kaur Manuke	AAP	61521	Malkit Singh Dakha	INC	35945	25576
Moga district	71	Nihal Singhwala (SC)	Manjit Singh	AAP	67313	Rajwinder Kaur	INC	39739	27574
Moga district	72	Bhagha Purana	Darshan Singh Brar	INC	48668	Gurbinder Singh Kang	AAP	41418	7250
Moga district	73	Moga	Harjot Kamal Singh	INC	52357	Ramesh Grover	AAP	50593	1764
Fazilka district	79	Jalalabad	Sukhbir Singh Badal	SAD	75271	Bhagwant Mann	AAP	56771	18500
Faridkot district	87	Faridkot	Kusaldeep Singh Kiki Dhillon	INC	51026	Gurdit Singh Sekhon	AAP	39367	11659
Faridkot district	88	Kotkapura	Kultar Singh Sandhwan	AAP	47401	Bhai Harnirpal Singh Kukku	INC	37326	10075
Faridkot district	89	Jaitu (SC)	Baldev Singh	AAP	45344	Mohammad Sadique	INC	35351	9993
Bathinda district	91	Bhucho Mandi (SC)	Pritam Singh Kotbhai	INC	51605	Jagsir Singh	AAP	50960	645
Bathinda district	92	Bathinda Urban	Manpreet Singh Badal	INC	63942	Deepak Bansal	AAP	45462	18480
Bathinda district	93	Bathinda Rural (SC)	Rupinder Kaur Ruby	AAP	51572	Er. Amit Rattan Kotfatta	SAD	40794	10778
Bathinda district	94	Talwandi Sabo	Prof. Baljinder Kaur	AAP	54553	Khushbaz Singh Jatana	INC	35260	19293
Bathinda district	95	Maur	Jagdev Singh	AAP	62282	Janmeja Singh Sekhon	SAD	47605	14677
Mansa district	96	Mansa	Nazar Singh Manshahia	AAP	70586	Manoj Bala	INC	50117	20469
Mansa district	98	Budhalada (SC)	Budh Ram	AAP	52265	Ranjit Kaur Bhatti	INC	50989	1276
Sangrur district	100	Dirba (SC)	Harpal Singh Cheema	AAP	46434	Ajaib Singh Ratolan	INC	44789	1645
Sangrur district	101	Sunam	Aman Arora	AAP	72815	Gobind Singh Longowal	SAD	42508	30307
Barnala district	102	Bhadaur (SC)	Pirmal Singh Dhaula	AAP	57095	Sant Balvir Singh Ghunas	SAD	36311	20784
Barnala district	103	Barnala	Gurmeet Singh Meet Haher	AAP	47606	Kewal Singh Dhillon	INC	45174	2432
Barnala district	104	Mehal Kalan (SC)	Kulwant Singh Pandori	AAP	57551	Ajit Singh Shant	SAD	30487	27064
Sangrur district	107	Dhuri	Dalvir Singh Goldy	INC	49347	Jasvir Singh Jassi Sekhon	AAP	46536	2811
Sangrur district	108	Sangrur	Vijay Inder Singla	INC	67310	Dinesh Bansal	AAP	36498	30812
Patiala district	109	Nabha (SC)	Sadhu Singh Dharamsot	INC	60861	Gurdev Singh Dev Mann	AAP	41866	18995
Patiala district	110	Patiala Rural	Brahm Mohindra	INC	68891	Karanvir Singh Tiwana	AAP	41662	27229
Patiala district	111	Rajpura	Hardial Singh Kamboj	INC	59107	Ashutosh Joshi	AAP	26542	32565
Patiala district	115	Patiala	Amarinder Singh	INC	72586	Dr. Balbir Singh	AAP	20179	52407

== General election, 2014 ==
The AAP fielded 434 candidates in the 2014 Indian general election, in which it did not expect to do well. It recognised that its support was based primarily in urban areas and that different strategies might be required for different regions of the country. The party pointed out that its funding was limited and that there were too many demands for local visits from Kejriwal. The intention was to field candidates in large numbers to maximise the likelihood of recognition as a national party by the Election Commission. The outcome was that four AAP candidates won, all from Punjab. Consequently, the AAP became a recognised state party in Punjab.

=== Elected MPs ===
No.	Constituency	Turnout%	Name of elected M.P.	Party affiliation	Margin
8	Fatehgarh Sahib(SC)	73.81 ▲	Harinder Singh Khalsa	Aam Aadmi Party	54,144
9	Faridkot(SC)	70.95 ▼	Sadhu Singh	Aam Aadmi Party	1,72,516
12	Sangrur	77.21 ▲	Bhagwant Mann	Aam Aadmi Party	2,11,721
13	Patiala	70.94 ▲	Dharam Vira Gandhi	Aam Aadmi Party	20,942

== Electoral Performance ==
=== Punjab Legislative Assembly elections ===
Punjab Legislative Assembly Elections
Year	Lok Sabha	Seats contested	Seats won	(+/-) in seats	% of votes	Vote swing	Popular vote	Outcome
2017	15th	112	20 / 117	▲20	23.70%	New	36,62,665	Opposition
2022	16th	117	92 / 117	▲72	42.01%	▲18.31	65,38,783	Government

=== General Elections ===
Lok Sabha Elections
Year	Lok Sabha	Seats contested	Seats won	(+/-) in seats	% of votes	Vote swing	Popular vote	Outcome
2014	16th	13	4 / 13	▲4	24.36%	New	33,73,062	Opposition
2019	17th	13	1 / 13	▼3	7.38%	▼16.98	10,15,773	Opposition
2024	18th	13	3 / 13	▲2	26.02%	▲18.64	35,06,939	Opposition

== Organisation ==
=== Convener/President ===
Convener (or chief/president) is the highest political post in the Punjab unit of Aam Aadmi Party, holds responsibilities for the success of Party in Punjab.

After 2014 Indian general election in Punjab on 29 August 2014, Sucha Singh Chhotepur was appointed as first convener of Aam Aadmi Party's Punjab unit. He served till 24 August 2016. After him Gurpreet Singh Waraich appointed the new convener.

In 2017 Punjab Legislative Assembly election party performed less than the expectations and got 20 seats in Punjab Legislative Assembly. Due to this he was removed from the post and Bhagwant Mann appointed as new convener along with Aman Arora. They resigned from the post on 17 March 2018 due to the apology by Arvind Kejriwal to Bikram Singh Majithia. After Maan and Arora's resignation Balbir Singh was appointed co-convener (caretaker) of Punjab's unit on 21 March 2018.

On 31 January 2019 before General election Maan was appointed as the Punjab convener. After 2022 assembly election in Punjab, AAP won majority under the leadership of Bhagwant Mann and he became the Chief Minister of Punjab. To look after party's programs, AAP appointed Budh Ram acting president of party in Punjab. On 22 November 2024, AAP appointed Aman Arora as president and Amansher Singh as vice-president.

=== List of Conveners ===
S. No.	Name	Portrait	Tenure			Co-convener	National Convener
1	Sucha Singh Chhotepur		29 August 2014	24 August 2016	1 year, 361 days	None	Arvind Kejriwal (2012-present)
2	Gurpreet Singh Waraich		4 September 2016	8 May 2017	246 days	None	Arvind Kejriwal (2012-present)
3	Bhagwant Singh Mann		10 May 2017	17 March 2018	311 days	Aman Arora	Arvind Kejriwal (2012-present)
-	Balbir Singh (caretaker)		21 March 2018	31 January 2019	316 days	Himself	Arvind Kejriwal (2012-present)
(3)	Bhagwant Singh Mann		31 January 2019	22 November 2024	5 years, 296 days	Aman Arora	Arvind Kejriwal (2012-present)
-	Budh Ram Singh (caretaker) (Note: Served as caretaker president to look after party work along with Bhagwant Mann after Mann was appointed as Chief Minister of Punjab until Aman Arora succeeded him as AAP president in Punjab.)		12 June 2023	22 November 2024	1 year, 163 days	Aman Arora	Arvind Kejriwal (2012-present)
4	Aman Arora		22 November 2024	Incumbent	1 year, 347 days	Amansher Singh	Arvind Kejriwal (2012-present)

=== Legislative Party leader ===
Legislative Party leader is a person who leads the elected members of the party in Punjab Legislative Assembly. On 11 March 2022, Bhagwant Mann was elected as the leader of the AAP legislative party.

No.	Name (constituency)	Portrait	Tenure		Other designation	Assembly
1	Harvinder Singh Phoolka (Dakha)		16 March 2017	9 July 2017	Leader of Opposition	15th
2	Sukhpal Singh Khaira (Bholath)		9 July 2017	26 July 2018	Leader of Opposition	15th
3	Harpal Singh Cheema (Dirba)		27 July 2018	11 March 2022	Leader of Opposition	15th
4	Bhagwant Mann (Dhuri)		11 March 2022	Incumbent	Chief Minister	16th

Deputy leader

No.	Name (constituency)	Portrait	Tenure		Other designation	Assembly
1	Saravjit Kaur Manuke (Jagraon)		16 March 2017	11 March 2022	Deputy Leader of Opposition	15th
2	Harpal Singh Cheema (Dirba)		19 March 2022	Incumbent	Minister of Finance	16th

== List of Current Rajya Sabha MPs from Punjab ==
Seat No.	Elected MP	M.P.s Portrait
1	Balbir Singh Seechewal	

== Activities ==
In June 2021, MLA and deputy leader of the opposition in Punjab assembly, Saravjit Kaur Manuke held hunger strike along with AAP activists to protest against the inaction of the Punjab government in the payment of post-matric scholarship amount of Dalit students. AAP convener Bhagwant Mann said that the protest by AAP members had forced the Punjab government then led by CM Amarinder Singh to release the funds amounting to 200 crore as 40% share of the amount that Punjab government had to pay.

== See also ==
- Politics of Punjab
- Aam Aadmi Party
- Aam Aadmi Party, Delhi
