= 2019 Indian general election in Punjab =

Punjabi polling

- 19 May 2019

13 seats
- Turnout: 65.94% (▼4.71%)
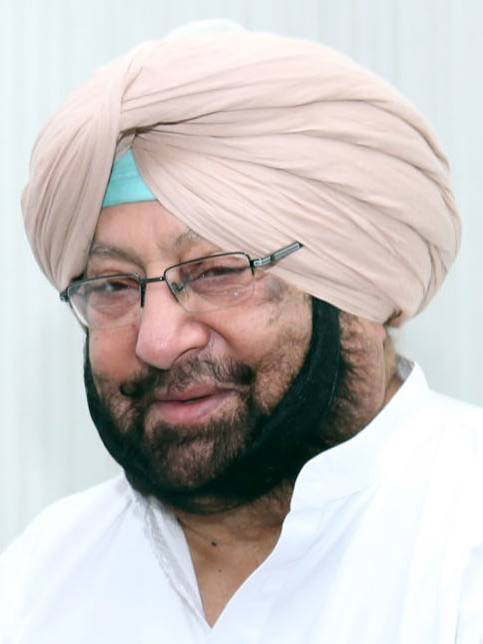

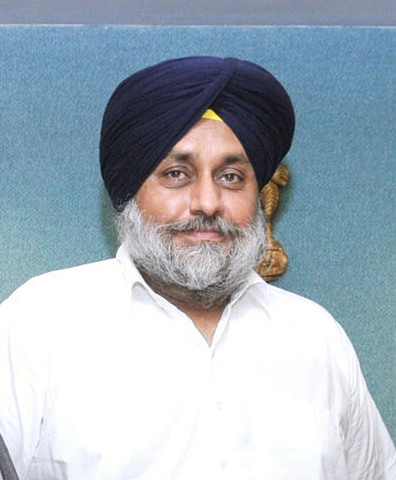

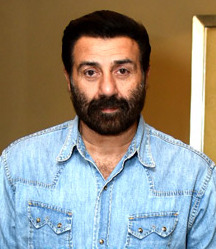

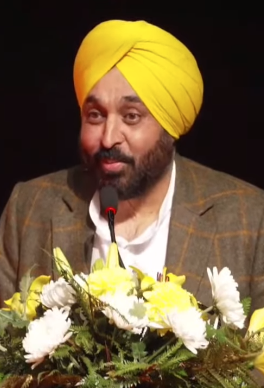
	First party	Second party
Leader	Amarinder Singh	Sukhbir Singh Badal
Party	INC	SAD
Alliance	UPA	NDA
Leader's seat	Did not contest	Firozpur
Last election	3 seats, 33.10%	4 seats, 26.30%
Seats won	8	2
Seat change	▲5	▼2
Percentage	40.12%	27.45%
Swing	▲7.02%	▲1.15%
	Third party	Fourth party
Leader	Sunny Deol	Bhagwant Mann
Party	BJP	AAP
Alliance	NDA
Leader's seat	Gurdaspur	Sangrur
Last election	2 seats, 8.70%	4 seats, 24.40%
Seats won	2	1
Seat change	Steady	▼3
Percentage	9.63%	7.38%
Swing	▲0.93%	▼17.02%
- Results by constituency
Prime Minister before election
Narendra Modi
BJP
Prime Minister after election
Narendra Modi
BJP

The 2019 Indian general election in Punjab was held on 19 May 2019, making it seventh and the last phase of the election. Counting was held on 23 May 2019 and result was also declared on same day.

== Parties and alliances ==
Alliance	Party	Flag	Symbol	Leader	Seats contested
United Progressive Alliance	Indian National Congress			Captain Amarinder Singh	13
None	Aam Aadmi Party			Arvind Kejriwal	13
National Democratic Alliance	Shiromani Akali Dal			Sukhbir Singh Badal	10
National Democratic Alliance	Bharatiya Janata Party			Sunny Deol	3
Punjab Democratic Alliance	Lok Insaaf Party			Simarjit Singh Bains	3
Punjab Democratic Alliance	Bahujan Samaj Party			Mayawati	3
Punjab Democratic Alliance	Punjab Ekta Party			Sukhpal Singh Khaira	3
Punjab Democratic Alliance	Communist Party of India			D. Raja	2
Punjab Democratic Alliance	Revolutionary Marxist Party			T. P. Chandrasekharan	1
Punjab Democratic Alliance	Nawan Punjab Party			Dharamvir Gandhi	1

== List of Candidates ==
Constituency		UPA		NDA		AAP	
#	Name	Party	Candidate	Party	Candidate	Party	Candidate
1	Gurdaspur	INC	Sunil Jakhar	BJP	Sunny Deol	AAP	Peter Masih
2	Amritsar	INC	Gurjeet Singh Aujla	BJP	Hardeep Singh Puri	AAP	Kuldip Singh Dhaliwal
3	Khadoor Sahib	INC	Jasbir Singh Gill	SAD	Jagir Kaur	AAP	Manjinder Singh Sidhu
4	Jalandhar (SC)	INC	Santokh Chaudhary	SAD	Charanjit Singh Atwal	AAP	Justice Zora Singh
5	Hoshiarpur (SC)	INC	Raj Kumar Chabbewal	BJP	Som Parkash	AAP	Ravjot Singh
6	Anandpur Sahib	INC	Manish Tiwari	SAD	Prem Chandumajra	AAP	Narinder Singh Shergill
7	Ludhiana	INC	Ravneet Singh Bittu	SAD	Maheshinder Singh	AAP	Tejpal Singh Simarjit
8	Fatehgarh Sahib (SC)	INC	Amar Singh	SAD	Darbara Guru	AAP	Bandeep Singh Dullo
9	Faridkot (SC)	INC	Mohammad Sadiq	SAD	Gulzar Singh Ranike	AAP	Sadhu Singh
10	Firozpur	INC	Sher Singh Ghubaya	SAD	Sukhbir Singh Badal	AAP	Harjinder Singh Kaka
11	Bathinda	INC	Amrinder Singh Warring	SAD	Harsimrat Kaur Badal	AAP	Baljinder Kaur
12	Sangrur	INC	Kewal Singh Dhillon	SAD	Parminder Dhindsa	AAP	Bhagwant Mann
13	Patiala	INC	Preneet Kaur	SAD	Surjit Singh Rakhra	AAP	Neena Mittal

== Surveys ==
=== Opinion polls ===
Date published	Polling agency				Lead
Date published	Polling agency	NDA	UPA	AAP	Lead
17 May 2019	elections.in	6	7	0	1
08 Apr 2019	Times of India	2	11	0	9
08 Apr 2019	News Nation	5	7	1	2
06 Apr 2019	India TV	3	9	1	6
5 April 2019	Republic TV-Jan ki Baat	3	9	1	6
Mar 2019	Zee 24 Taas	1	10	2	8
Mar 2019	India TV	3	9	1	6
Jan 2019	ABP News - Cvoter	1	12	0	11
Oct 2018	ABP News- CSDS	1	12	0	11

=== Exit Polls ===
Date published	Polling agency				Lead
Date published	Polling agency	NDA	UPA	AAP	Lead
19 May 2019	Times Now-VMR	3	10	0	7
19 May 2019	Aaj Tak	3–5	8-9	0–1	3-6
19 May 2018	NEWS 18 INDIA	2	10	1	8
19 May 2019	Today's Chanakya	6	6	1	0
19 May 2018	NDTV	4	8	1	4
19 May 2018	News-X	4	8	1	4
19 May 2018	India TV CNX	5	8	0	3

== Coalition and Party wise result ==
Alliance/ Party		Popular vote			Seats		
Alliance/ Party		Votes	%	±pp	Contested	Won	+/−
INC		5,523,066	40.12	▲7.02	13	8	▲5
NDA	SAD	3,778,574	27.54	▲1.24	10	2	▼2
NDA	BJP	1,325,445	9.63	▲0.93	3	2	Steady
NDA	Total	5,104,019	37.17	▲2.18	13	4	▼2
AAP		1,015,773	7.38	▼17.02	13	1	▼3
PDA	BSP	479,788	3.49	Steady	3	0	Steady
PDA	LIP	469,784	3.41	Steady	3	0	Steady
PDA	PEP	296,620	2.15	Steady	3	0	Steady
PDA	NPP	161,645	1.17	Steady	1	0	Steady
PDA	CPI	42,463	0.30	Steady	2	0	Steady
PDA	RMP	15,274	0.11	Steady	1	0	Steady
PDA	Total	1,465,574	10.65	Steady	13	0	Steady
SAD(A)		52,185	0.38	Steady	2	0	Steady
Others		215,286	1.56	Steady	101	0	Steady
IND		235,106	1.71	Steady	123	0	Steady
NOTA		154,423	1.12	Steady			
Total		13,765,432	100%	-	278	13	-

== Constituency wise results ==
Constituency		Winner				Runner Up				Margin	%
#	Name	Candidate	Party	Votes	%	Candidate	Party	Votes	%	Margin	%
1	Gurdaspur	Sunny Deol	BJP	558,719	50.58	Sunil Kumar Jakhar	INC	476,260	43.12	82,459	7.46
2	Amritsar	Gurjeet Singh Aujla	INC	445,032	51.71	Hardeep Singh Puri	BJP	345,406	40.14	99,626	11.57
3	Khadoor Sahib	Jasbir Singh Gill	INC	459,710	43.86	Jagir Kaur	SAD	319,137	30.45	140,573	13.41
4	Jalandhar	Santokh Chaudhary	INC	385,712	37.84	Charanjit Singh Atwal	SAD	366,221	35.93	19,491	1.91
5	Hoshiarpur	Som Parkash	BJP	421,320	42.49	Raj Kumar Chabbewal	INC	372,790	37.59	48,530	4.90
6	Anandpur Sahib	Manish Tewari	INC	428,045	39.56	Prem Chandumajra	SAD	381,161	35.23	46,884	4.33
7	Ludhiana	Ravneet Singh Bittu	INC	383,795	36.66	Simarjit Singh Bains	LIP	307,423	29.36	76,372	7.30
8	Fatehgarh Sahib	Amar Singh	INC	411,651	41.70	Darbara Singh Guru	SAD	317,753	32.19	93,898	9.51
9	Faridkot	Mohammad Sadique	INC	419,065	42.97	Gulzar Singh Ranike	SAD	335,809	34.43	83,256	8.54
10	Firozpur	Sukhbir Singh Badal	SAD	633,427	54.01	Sher Singh Ghubaya	INC	434,577	37.05	198,850	16.96
11	Bathinda	Harsimrat Kaur Badal	SAD	492,824	40.98	Amrinder Singh Raja	INC	471,052	39.17	21,772	1.81
12	Sangrur	Bhagwant Mann	AAP	413,561	37.35	Kewal Singh Dhillon	INC	303,350	27.40	110,211	9.95
13	Patiala	Preneet Kaur	INC	532,027	45.13	Surjit Singh Rakhra	SAD	369,309	31.33	162,718	13.80

== Post-election Union Council of Ministers from Punjab ==
#	Name	Constituency	Designation	Department	From	To	Party
1	Harsimrat Kaur Badal	Bathinda	Cabinet Minister	Minister of Food Processing Industries	31 May 2019	18 September 2020 (Resigned)	SAD
2	Som Parkash	Hoshiarpur (SC)	MoS	MoS in the Ministry of Commerce and Industry	31 May 2019	9 June 2024	BJP

== By-Polls Held ==
Constituency			Winner				Runner Up				Margin
No.	Name	Date	Candidate	Party	Votes	%	Candidate	Party	Votes	%	Margin
12	Sangrur	23 June 2022	Simranjit Singh Mann	SAD(A)	253,154	35.61	Gurmail Singh	AAP	247,332	34.79	6,245
12	Sangrur	23 June 2022	The Sangrur Lok Sabha bypoll was held after the resignation of the incumbent MP, Bhagwant Mann, following his appointment as Chief Minister of Punjab.								
4	Jalandhar (SC)	10 May 2023	Sushil Kumar Rinku	AAP	302,279	34.05	Karamjit Kaur Chaudhary	INC	243,588	27.44	58,691
4	Jalandhar (SC)	10 May 2023	The Jalandhar Lok Sabha bypoll was held following the death of the incumbent MP, Santokh Singh Chaudhary.								

== Assembly segments wise lead of Parties ==
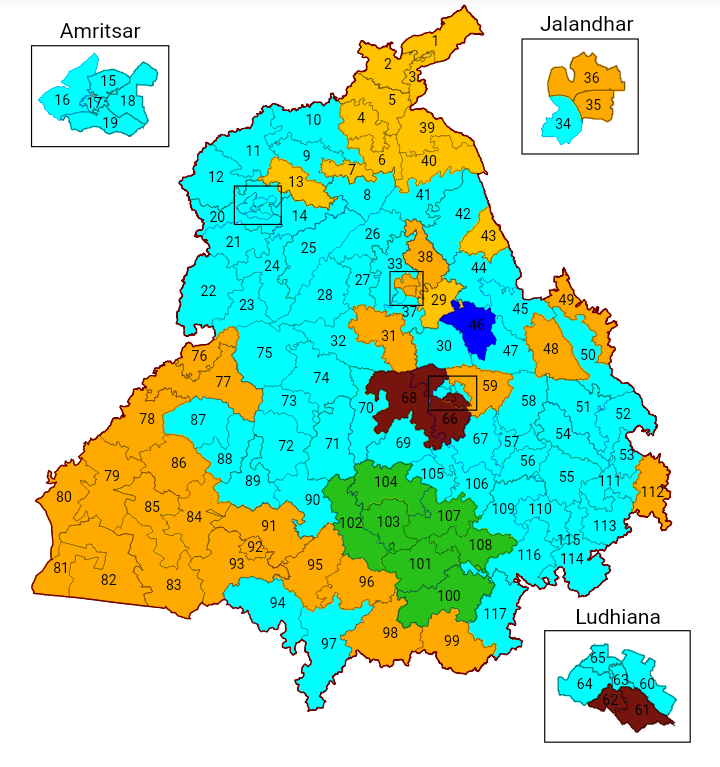

Party	Assembly segments	Position in Assembly (2022 election)
Aam Aadmi Party	7	92
Bahujan Samaj Party	2	1
Bharatiya Janata Party	12	2
Indian National Congress	69	18
Lok Insaaf Party	4	0
Shiromani Akali Dal	23	3
Total	117	

== See also ==
- 2024 Indian general election in Punjab
- 2022 Punjab Legislative Assembly election
- 2021 Punjab, India local elections
