= Boparai Kalan =

Boparai Kalan is a village of Punjab in the district of Ludhiana.

== Notable people ==
- Akali Joginder Singh, a Nihang Jathedar
- Dr. Amar Singh, Member of Parliament for Fatehgarh Sahib
- Gurcharan Singh Boparai, former MLA for Raikot
- Parmeet Singh Boparai, Canadian politician as Alberta MLA for Calgary-Falconridge
