= Bikramjit Singh Khalsa =

Indian politician

Member of the Legislative Assembly
- In office 1997–2002
- Governor: B. K. N. Chhibber
- Preceded by: Malkiat Singh Dakha
- Constituency: Dakha Assembly constituency

Personal details
- Born: Punjab, India
- Party: Shiromani Akali Dal

Bikramjit Singh Khalsa is an Indian politician who belongs to Shiromani Akali Dal. He was elected twice for Punjab Legislative Assembly, first becoming Member of the Legislative Assembly for the Dakha Assembly constituency in 1997 and then from Khanna Assembly constituency in 2007. He was chief Parliament Secretary from 2007 to 2012. He was also elected as Punjab Public Service Commission Member for six years. He was the Shiromani Akali Dal Candidate for Fatehgarh Sahib Lok Sabha constituency for the 2024 Indian general election.

== Electoral Performance ==
Punjab Legislative Assembly Election, 1997: 55. Dakha
Party	Candidate	Votes	%	±%
SAD	Bikramjit Singh Khalsa	64,605	51.93	New entry
INC	Malkiat Singh Dakha	49,495	39.78	▼26.79
SAD(A)	Jagdish Kaur	9,423	7.57	New entry
Independent	Baldev Singh	624	0.50	New entry
Independent	Anokh Singh	267	0.21	New entry
Majority		15,010	12.06	
Turnout		124,414	60.52	
Registered electors				
SAD gain from INC		Swing		

Punjab Assembly election, 2012: Raikot
Party	Candidate	Votes	%	±%
INC	Gurcharan Singh Boparai	49,553	45.89	▼2.71
SAD	Bikramjit Singh Khalsa	45,660	42.29	▼3.92
PPoP	Hakam Singh	9,746	9.03	New entry
BSP	Baldev Singh	2,167	2.01	▲1.18
Independent	Baldev Singh	851	0.79	New entry
Majority		3,893	3.61	
Turnout		107,977	78.18	
Registered electors				
INC hold		Swing		

2024 Indian general election: Fatehgarh Sahib
Party	Candidate	Votes	%	±%
INC	Dr. Amar Singh	332,591	34.14	▼7.61
AAP	Gurpreet Singh GP	298,389	30.63	▲24.25
BJP	Gejja Ram Valmiki	127,521	13.09	New
SAD	Bikramjit Singh	126,730	13.01	▼19.22
SAD(A)	Raj Jatinder Singh Bittu	43,644	4.48	
NOTA	None of the Above	9,188	0.94	
Majority		34,202	3.51	
Turnout		974,256	62.53	
INC hold		Swing	▼7.61	
