= Raikot Assembly constituency =

Legislative Assembly constituency in Punjab State, India

Coordinates: 30.65°N 75.59°E

Raikot
- Constituency No. 69 for the Punjab Legislative Assembly

Constituency details
- Country: India
- State: Punjab
- District: Ludhiana
- Lok Sabha constituency: Fatehgarh Sahib
- Total electors: 156,301
- Reservation: SC

Member of Legislative Assembly
- 16th Punjab Legislative Assembly
- Incumbent Hakam Singh Thekedar
- Party: Aam Aadmi Party
- Elected year: 2022

Raikot is a Punjab Legislative Assembly constituency in Ludhiana district, Punjab state, India. This constituency was once represented by Gurnam Singh, a former Chief Minister. The current representative is Hakam Singh Thekedar

== Members of the Legislative Assembly ==
Most successful parties from Raikot Vidhan Sabha
1. INC(6 Times) (37.5%)
2. SAD (6 Times) (37.5%)
3. AAP (2 Times) (12.5%)
4. AD – SFS (1 Time) (6.25%)
5. INC (I) (1 Time) (6.25%)

Year	Member	Party
1957 (Note: ByPoll)	P. Singh	Indian National Congress
1957	Wazir Singh	Indian National Congress
1962	Gurnam Singh	Shiromani Akali Dal
1967	Jagdev Singh Talwandi	Akali Dal – Sant Fateh Singh Group
1969	Jagdev Singh Talwandi	Shiromani Akali Dal
1972	Jagdev Singh Talwandi	Shiromani Akali Dal
1977	Dev Raj Singh Talwandi	Shiromani Akali Dal
1980	Jagdev Singh	Indian National Congress (Indira)
1985	Talib Singh	Shiromani Akali Dal
1992	Nirmal Singh	Indian National Congress
1997	Harmohinder Singh	Indian National Congress
2002	Ranjit Singh Talwandi	Shiromani Akali Dal
2007	Harmohinder Singh	Indian National Congress
2012	Gurcharan Singh Boparai	Indian National Congress
2017	Jagtar Singh Jagga Hissowal	Aam Aadmi Party
2022	Hakam Singh Thekedar	Aam Aadmi Party

== Election results ==
=== 2027 ===
Punjab Assembly election, 2027: Raikot
Party	Candidate	Votes	%	±%
INC				
BSP				
AAP				
AD (WPD)	Jagroop Singh			New entry
SAD				New entry
BJP				New entry
NOTA	None of the above			
Majority				
Turnout				

=== 2022 ===
Punjab Assembly election, 2022: Raikot
Party	Candidate	Votes	%	±%
AAP	Hakam Singh Thekedar	63,659	56.04	▲14.83
INC	Kamil Amar Singh	36,015	31.70	▼0.45
BSP	Balwinder Singh Sandhu	8,381	7.38	▲6.63
Independent	Dr. Jagtar Singh	1,514	1.33	New entry
SAD(S)	Gurpal Singh Goldy	1,276	1.12	New entry
NOTA	None of the above	1,232	1.08	
Majority		27,644	24.34	
Turnout				
Registered electors				
AAP hold		Swing		

=== 2017 ===
Punjab Assembly election, 2017: Raikot
Party	Candidate	Votes	%	±%
AAP	Jagtar Singh Jagga Hissowal	48,245	41.21	New entry
INC	Dr. Amar Singh	37,631	32.15	▼13.74
SAD	Inder Iqbal Singh Atwal	29,019	24.80	▼17.49
BSP	Surinder Singh	878	0.75	▼1.26
NOTA	None of the above	816	0.70	
Majority		10,614	9.06	
Turnout		117,046	77.81	
Registered electors		150,418		
AAP gain from INC		Swing		

=== 2012 ===
Punjab Assembly election, 2012: Raikot
Party	Candidate	Votes	%	±%
INC	Gurcharan Singh Boparai	49,553	45.89	▼2.71
SAD	Bikramjit Singh Khalsa	45,660	42.29	▼3.92
PPoP	Hakam Singh	9,746	9.03	New entry
BSP	Baldev Singh	2,167	2.01	▲1.18
Independent	Baldev Singh	851	0.79	New entry
Majority		3,893	3.61	
Turnout		107,977	78.18	
Registered electors				
INC hold		Swing		

=== 2007 ===
Punjab Assembly election, 2007: Raikot
Party	Candidate	Votes	%	±%
INC	Harmohinder Singh	49,629	48.60	▲6.54
SAD	Ranjit Singh Talwandi	47,190	46.21	▼2.93
Independent	Rajwinder Singh	1,949	1.91	New entry
CPI(ML)L	Tarsem Singh Jodhan	989	0.97	New entry
Independent	Baljit Singh	869	0.85	New entry
BSP	Kulwant Singh	849	0.83	▼0.53
Independent	Tarlochan Singh	641	0.63	New entry
Majority		2,439	2.39	
Turnout		102,116		
Registered electors				
INC gain from SAD		Swing		

=== 2002 ===
Punjab Legislative Assembly Election, 2002: Raikot
Party	Candidate	Votes	%	±%
SAD	Ranjit Singh Talwandi	44,388	49.14	▲11.00
INC	Harmohinder Singh Pardhan	37,989	42.06	▼0.60
LBP	Avtar Singh Mullanpuri	3,087	3.42	New entry
SAD(A)	Baldev Singh Bains	2,483	2.75	▲2.48
BSP	Jagjit Singh	1,226	1.36	▼6.44
Independent	Jagjit Singh	1,150	1.27	New entry
Majority		6,399	7.08	
Turnout		90,323	67.60	
Registered electors				
SAD gain from INC		Swing		

=== 1997 ===
Punjab Legislative Assembly Election, 1997: Raikot
Party	Candidate	Votes	%	±%
INC	Harmohinder Singh Pardhan	38,297	42.66	▼17.85
SAD	Ranjit Singh Talwandi	34,245	38.14	▼1.35
BSP	Paramjit Singh Ranu	7,006	7.80	New entry
Independent	Nirmal Singh	4,198	4.68	New entry
CPI(M)	Rachhpal Singh	2,421	2.70	New entry
Independent	Rajwinder Singh	2,414	2.69	New entry
Independent	Hardev Singh Sandhu	957	1.07	New entry
SAD(A)	Talib Singh	244	0.27	New entry
Majority		4,052	4.51	
Turnout		89,782	74.23	
Registered electors				
INC hold		Swing		

=== 1992 ===
Punjab Legislative Assembly Election, 1992: Raikot
Party	Candidate	Votes	%	±%
INC	Nirmal Singh	4,325	60.51	▲29.08
SAD	Bachitter Singh	2,822	39.49	▼12.79
Majority		1,503	21.03	
Turnout		7,147	7.12	
Registered electors				
INC gain from SAD		Swing		

=== 1985 ===
Punjab Legislative Assembly Election, 1985: Raikot
Party	Candidate	Votes	%	±%
SAD	Talib Singh	27,885	52.28	▲8.50
INC	Gurcharan Singh	16,763	31.43	▼16.89
CPI(M)	Rachhpal Singh	8,378	15.71	New entry
Independent	Abjinder Singh	316	0.59	New entry
Majority		11,122	20.85	
Turnout		53,342	61.37	
Registered electors				
SAD gain from INC(I)		Swing		

=== 1980 ===
Punjab Legislative Assembly Election, 1980: Raikot
Party	Candidate	Votes	%	±%
INC(I)	Jagdev Singh	27,615	48.32	▲7.05
SAD	Dev Raj Singh Talwandi	25,020	43.78	▼5.42
JP(S)	Thakar Singh	4,046	7.08	New entry
Majority		2,595	4.54	
Turnout		57,149	63.99	
Registered electors				
INC(I) gain from SAD		Swing		

=== 1977 ===
Punjab Legislative Assembly Election, 1977: Raikot
Party	Candidate	Votes	%	±%
SAD	Dev Raj Singh Talwandi	25,666	49.20	▲1.54
INC	Gurcharan Singh	21,528	41.27	▼0.22
Independent	Gurdial Singh	3,674	7.04	New entry
Majority		4,138	7.93	
Turnout		52,167	65.52	
Registered electors				
SAD hold		Swing		

=== 1972 ===
Punjab Legislative Assembly Election, 1972: Raikot
Party	Candidate	Votes	%	±%
SAD	Jagdev Singh Talwandi	26,517	47.66	▼7.04
INC	Satwant Singh	23,086	41.49	▼1.92
CPI(M)	Rachhpal Singh	4,260	7.66	New entry
Majority		3,431	6.19	
Turnout		55,461	74.79	
Registered electors				
SAD hold		Swing		

=== 1969 ===
Punjab Legislative Assembly Election, 1969: Raikot
Party	Candidate	Votes	%	±%
SAD	Jagdev Singh Talwandi	26,438	54.70	▼6.59
INC	Pal Singh	20,981	43.41	▲7.48
Independent	Babu Ram	913	1.89	New entry
Majority		5,457	11.04	
Turnout		49,448		
Registered electors				
SAD gain from Akali Dal (SFS)		Swing		

=== 1967 ===
Punjab Legislative Assembly Election, 1967: Raikot
Party	Candidate	Votes	%	±%
Akali Dal (SFS)	Jagdev Singh Talwandi	28,912	61.29	
INC	Satwant Singh	16,947	35.93	
Majority		11,965	24.74	
Turnout		48,357		
Registered electors				
Akali Dal (SFS) gain from SAD		Swing		

=== 1962 ===
Punjab Legislative Assembly Election, 1962: Raikot
Party	Candidate	Votes	%	±%
SAD	Gurnam Singh	23,195		
INC	Inder Singh	16,947		
Majority		6,248		
Turnout				
Registered electors				
SAD gain from INC		Swing		

=== 1957 ===
Punjab Legislative Assembly Election, 1957: Raikot
Party	Candidate	Votes	%	±%
INC	Wazir Singh	35,960		
CPI	Ajit Kumar	30,011		
Majority		5,949		
Turnout				
Registered electors				
INC hold		Swing		

=== Bypoll 1957 ===
Bypoll, 1957: Raikot
Party	Candidate	Votes	%	±%
INC	P. Singh	25,452		
CPI	J. Singh	15,076		
Majority		10,376		
Turnout				
Registered electors				
