= Gurcharan Singh Boparai =

Indian politician

Member of Punjab Legislative Assembly
- In office 6 March 2012 – 11 March 2017
- Governor: Shivraj Patil
- Preceded by: Harmohinder Singh Pardhan
- Succeeded by: Jagtar Singh Jagga Hissowal
- Constituency: Raikot

Personal details
- Born: 1957/1958 Boparai Kalan, Ludhiana, Punjab, India
- Party: Indian National Congress
- Relatives: Dr. Amar Singh (brother)

Gurcharan Singh Boparai is an Indian politician of Indian National Congress and a former member of the Punjab Legislative Assembly from Raikot constituency.

== Political career ==
Boparai won the 2012 election on the Indian National Congress ticket, defeating Shiromani Akali Dal candidate Bikramjit Singh Khalsa. He served as a Member of the Committee of Privileges, the Committee on Government Assurances, and the Committee on Papers Laid on the Table of the House. Boparai’s tenure was marked by an absence of progress, which he claimed was a result of the lack of grants from the incumbent government. He was not fielded by the Congress in 2017, instead being replaced with his brother Dr. Amar Singh.

== Electoral performance ==
Punjab Assembly election, 2012: Raikot
Party	Candidate	Votes	%	±%
INC	Gurcharan Singh Boparai	49,553	45.89	▼2.71
SAD	Bikramjit Singh Khalsa	45,660	42.29	▼3.92
PPoP	Hakam Singh	9,746	9.03	New entry
BSP	Baldev Singh	2,167	2.01	▲1.18
Independent	Baldev Singh	851	0.79	New entry
Majority		3,893		
Turnout		107,977		
Registered electors				
INC hold		Swing		
