= Khanna Assembly constituency =

Legislative Assembly constituency in Punjab State, India

Coordinates: 30.71°N 76.22°E

Khanna
- Constituency No. 57 for the Punjab Legislative Assembly

Constituency details
- Country: India
- State: Punjab
- District: Ludhiana
- Lok Sabha constituency: Fatehgarh Sahib
- Total electors: 172,035
- Reservation: None

Member of Legislative Assembly
- 16th Punjab Legislative Assembly
- Incumbent Tarunpreet Singh Sond
- Party: Aam Aadmi Party
- Elected year: 2022

Khanna Assembly constituency (Sl. No.: 57) is a Punjab Legislative Assembly constituency in Ludhiana district, Punjab state, India.

== Members of the Legislative Assembly ==
Most successful parties from Khanna Vidhan Sabha
1. INC (6 Times) (42.9%)
2. SAD (5 Times) (35.7%)
3. AAP (1 Time) (7.14%)
4. RPI (1 Time) (7.14%)
5. INC (I) (1 Time) (7.14%)

Year	Member	Party
1962	Jagir Singh	Indian National Congress
1967	G. Singh	Republican Party of India
1969	Naurang Singh	Shiromani Akali Dal
1972	Prithvi Singh Azad	Indian National Congress
1977	Bachan Singh	Shiromani Akali Dal
1980	Shamsher Singh	Indian National Congress (Indira)
1985	Sukhdev Singh	Shiromani Akali Dal
1992	Shamsher Singh	Indian National Congress
1997	Bachan Singh	Shiromani Akali Dal
2002	Harbans Kaur	Indian National Congress
2007	Bikramjit Singh Khalsa	Shiromani Akali Dal
2012	Gurkirat Singh Kotli	Indian National Congress
2017	Gurkirat Singh Kotli	Indian National Congress
2022	Tarunpreet Singh Sond	Aam Aadmi Party

== Election results ==
=== 2027 ===
Punjab Assembly election, 2027: Khanna
Party	Candidate	Votes	%	±%
AAP				
AD (WPD)				New entry
INC				
BSP				
SAD				
BJP				
NOTA	None of the above			
Majority				
Turnout				

=== 2022 ===
2022 Punjab Legislative Assembly election: Khanna
Party	Candidate	Votes	%	±%
AAP	Tarunpreet Singh Sond	62,425	48.55	▲20.63
SAD	Jasdeep Kaur Yadu	26,805	20.85	▼4.47
INC	Gurkirat Singh Kotli	20,305	15.79	▼28.50
BJP	Gurpreet Singh Bhatti	12,667	9.85	New entry
SAD(A)	Parmjeet Singh Rinka	3,936	3.06	▲2.71
NOTA	None of the above	694	0.54	
Majority		35,620	27.7	
Turnout		128,586	74.74	
Registered electors		172,035		
AAP gain from INC		Swing		

=== 2017 ===
Punjab Assembly election, 2017: Khanna
Party	Candidate	Votes	%	±%
INC	Gurkirat Singh Kotli	55,690	44.29	▲5.93
AAP	Anil Dutt Phally	35,099	27.92	New entry
SAD	Ranjit Singh Talwandi	31,845	25.32	▼6.84
BSP	Shashi Vardhan	1,202	0.96	▼4.31
SAD(A)	Rajiv Vijan	446	0.35	▼0.06
NOTA	None of the above	850	0.68	
Majority		20,591	16.37	
Turnout		125,732	78.42	
Registered electors				
INC hold		Swing		

=== 2012 ===
Punjab Assembly election, 2012: Khanna
Party	Candidate	Votes	%	±%
INC	Gurkirat Singh Kotli	45,045	38.36	
SAD	Ranjit Singh Talwandi	37,767	32.16	
PPoP	Gurpreet Singh	23,370	19.90	New entry
BSP	Navjot Singh Mandair	6,194	5.27	
SAD(A)	Mahan Singh	476	0.41	New entry
Majority		7,278	6.20	
Turnout		117,428	80.92	
Registered electors				
INC gain from SAD		Swing		
