= Jagdev Singh Talwandi =

Indian politician (24 June 1929 – 19 September 2014)

- ਜਗਦੇਵ ਸਿੰਘ ਤਲਵੰਡੀ
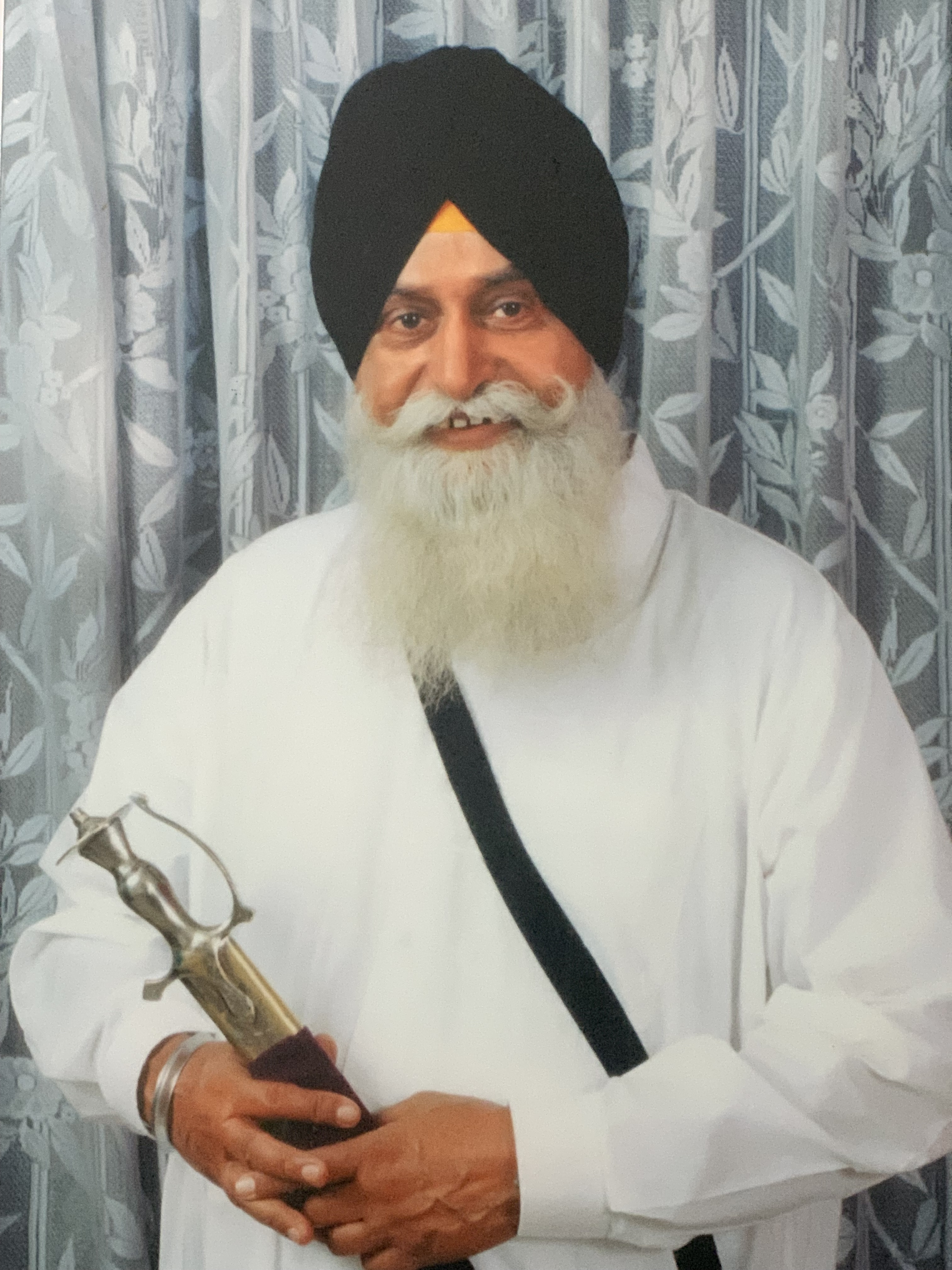

25th President of Shiromani Gurdwara Parbandhak Committee
- In office 30 November 2000 – 27 November 2001
- Preceded by: Jagir Kaur
- Succeeded by: Kirpal Singh Badungar

Member of Parliament, Rajya Sabha
- In office 1980-1986

Member of Parliament, Lok Sabha
- In office 1977-1980
- Preceded by: Devinder Singh Garcha
- Succeeded by: Devinder Singh Garcha
- Constituency: Ludhiana, Punjab

Member of the Punjab Legislative Assembly
- In office 1967-1977
- Preceded by: Gurnam Singh
- Succeeded by: Devraj Singh
- Constituency: Raikot

Cabinet Minister, Government of Punjab
- In office 1969-1971
- Chief Minister: Gurnam Singh
- Ministry and Departments: Development and Animal Husbandry

Personal details
- Born: 24 June 1929 Lyallpur, Punjab, British India
- Died: 19 September 2014 (aged 85) Ludhiana, Punjab, India
- Party: Shiromani Akali Dal
- Other political affiliations: Akali Dal – Jagdev Singh Talwandi Group; Akali Dal – Sant Fateh Singh Group
- Spouse: Mohinder Kaur
- Children: 4
- Parent: Chhanga Singh (father)

Jagdev Singh Talwandi (24 June 1929 – 19 September 2014) was an Indian politician. He was elected to the Lok Sabha in 1978 as a member of the Shiromani Akali Dal (SAD), a Sikh-centered regional political party. Talwandi was elected SAD president in 1978 and 1988. He became the President of the Shiromani Gurdwara Parbandhak Committee (SGPC) in 2000. He was elected to the Punjab Vidhan Sabha thrice in 1967, 1969, and 1972, and was inducted as a Minister of State for Development and Animal Husbandry in the Gurnam Singh Ministry and the Minister of State for Jails, Sports and Transport in the Parkash Singh Badal government. He represented Punjab in the Rajya Sabha from 1980 to 1986.

== Early life and background ==
Talwandi was born at Chak No. 52, Lyallpur District (now in Pakistan) on 24 June 1929. His father, Jathedar Chhanga Singh, was a landlord in Mullanpur village in Lyallpur district. Chhanga Singh had actively participated in all Sikh morchas, including those of Guru Kal Bagh, Gangsar, Jaitu Nabha, Nankana Sahib, and Duska. As he was a member of the Lyallpur District Board at the time, his lambardar, which entitled him to a free land holding of 25 acres, was forfeited because of his actions. When no one in the village accepted the lambardar, the Government was forced to pass it on to his Talwandi, who did not have formal schooling. In an interview, he admitted that he had never attended school. "I am an illiterate person. I have no formal education. Whatever little I know is what I have learned from experience in these 70 years. I firmly believe religion is the guiding light in everyone's life".

== Political career ==
After independence, Chhanga Singh settled at Talwandi village in Ludhiana district, and was unanimously elected the sarpanch in 1955 for a decade. He earned the title of Hindi: Loh Purush, lit. 'Iron Man' for his role in early years of Akali politics followed by arrests in all Punjabi Suba morchas, along with his brother Master Dev Raj Singh. He was arrested on 9 July 1975 for being a part of the first jatha against the Emergency and spent 19 months in jail.

In 1960 and 1965 he was chosen as a member of the SGPC. He was elected thrice to become a member of the Punjab Assembly in 1967, 1969, and 1972, and was elected to the Lok Sabha in 1977. He was inducted as the Minister of State for Development and Animal Husbandry in the Gurnam Singh Ministry, and was also unanimously elected Leader of the Akali Legislature Party in 1967. He was the Minister of State for Jails, Sports and Transport in the Parkash Singh Badal Ministry.

He was appointed Senior Vice-President of the Akali Dal after Fateh Singh's death, and remained a member of the Akali Dal Working Committee since 1960. He was detained under the MISA for eighteen months during the emergency imposed by Prime Minister Indira Gandhi and remained in Patiala jail with the late Prime Minister Chandra Shekhar, other leaders of the political parties, and the Akali Dal.

As the emergency was lifted by Gandhi in January 1977, all the political leaders opposed to Indira Gandhi were released and there was a discussion to merge political parties to form one political party in the Centre. The Janata Party was created as a result. On Mr. Mohan Singh Tur's indisposition in April 1977, Jathedar Talwandi was appointed Acting President of the Akali Dal. As a member of the Dal Parliamentary Board and chief of the party, he helped it win 58 out of 116 Punjab Assembly seats. He declared that the Akali Dal would cooperate with the newly formed Janata Party but would not merge with it and would remain its separate entity.

Talwandi brought Parkash Singh Badal back to Punjab politics after the latter fell sick. In the 1977 Vidhan Sabha elections that followed the Lok Sabha elections, The Akali Dal and Janata parties came into power with Badal as Chief Minister.

The trio of Akali Dal (Jagdev Singh Talwandi, Gurcharan Singh Tohra, and Prakash Singh Badal) dominated the political scene. Talwandi organized the All India Akali Conference in Ludhiana in the month of October 1978 after 13 Sikhs were killed in a fight between Nirankaris and Akhand Kirtani Jatha followers. The conference was a big success and the Anandpur Sahib Resolution was passed with some amendments.

The Akali-Janata Government was working smoothly when issues of alleged corruption by education minister Sukhjinder Singh surfaced. Badal wanted to remove Sukhjinder Singh while Talwandi and Tohra opposed. Sukhjinder Singh was ousted from the cabinet and two ministers, Jaswinder Singh Brar and Randhir Singh Cheema, resigned as a show of solidarity with Sukhjinder Singh. This widened the differences between Badal on one side and Talwandi and Tohra on the other.

Tohra reconciled with Badal and a complaint against Talwandi was made to the Akal Takhat and he was summoned by the Jathedar Akal Takhat who declared he wasn't "tankhwaya". In 1980 Talwandi parted ways with Badal and formed his own party, Akali Dal – Jagdev Singh Talwandi Group. Meanwhile, Gandhi returned to power and she dismissed the Badal Government.

Talwandi led a jatha to Delhi where he was detained in Tihar Jail for more than 18 months. He was released on appeal from the Akal Takhat and Sant Harchand Singh Longowal, dictator of Dharam Yudh Morcha. Talwandi was willingly arrested in Dharam Yudh Morcha along with one thousand followers at Ludhiana. He was detained at Ludhiana jail with Badal.

As the Punjab state was engulfed in militancy and the Operation Blue Star took place in 1984, all the senior leaders of the Akali Dal were detained in different jails. By 1987, the party was leaderless. In 1989, Talwandi became the president of the Akali Dal. In November 1989, an assassination attempt was made on him in his village by the militants. His loyal supporter Harjinder Singh Jind, a member of the SGPC, and his gunman were killed in the attack, and Talwandi and his personal assistant Ujagar Singh were badly injured.

Talwandi became the president of the SGPC in 2001.

== Personal life ==
He married Mohinder Kaur and has two sons and two daughters. His younger son Jagjit Singh Talwandi became SGPC member and his elder son is Ranjit Singh Talwandi, an Akali Dal leader, who was elected as a Member of Legislative Assembly (MLA) of Punjab in 2002. His daughter Harjit Kaur Talwandi is serving as the President of the Women's Wing of Shiromani Akali Dal (Sanyukt) in 2022.

He has authored a book titled Mool Manter Swami Ram Tirath. He played an active role in the telecast of the Gurbani program via the ETC Channel.

== Death ==
Talwandi was admitted to the Hero DMC Heart Institute due to multiple infections in the heart, kidney, and stomach. Vishwa Mohan had treated his condition critical on 6 September. News of his death spread on the morning of 19 September at seven o'clock. However, the doctors later maintained that his heart was beating and could not be declared clinically dead. He was pronounced dead by the Institute’s chief cardiologist, Gurpreet Singh Wander, DMCH medical superintendent Rajoo Chinna, and the Ludhiana civil surgeon at 11.10 am on 21 August 2014. He was 85 years old.

== Legacy ==
In September 2016, Deputy CM Sukhbir Singh Badal, while attending Talwandi's second Barsi Samagam (death anniversary), laid the foundation stone of the "Jathedar Jagdev Singh Talwandi College of Professional Studies" at Bassian Kothi, near Ludhiana.

In March 2020, the SGPC installed a portrait of Talwandi in the Central Sikh Museum in Punjab.

== Electoral performance ==
=== 1977 ===
1977 Indian general election: Ludhiana
| Party | Candidate | Votes | % | ±% |
|---|---|---|---|---|
| SAD | Jagdev Singh Talwandi | 296,119 | 58.9% | |
| INC | Devinder Singh Garcha | 192,525 | 38.3% | |
| Independent | Kirpal Singh Ghurani | 3,530 | 0.7% | |
| Turnout | | 5,02,599 | | |

Punjab Legislative Assembly Election, 1972: Raikot
| Party | Candidate | Votes | % | ±% |
|---|---|---|---|---|
| SAD | Jagdev Singh Talwandi | 26,517 | 47.66 | ▼7.04 |
| INC | Satwant Singh | 23,086 | 41.49 | ▼1.92 |
| CPI(M) | Rachhpal Singh | 4,260 | 7.66 | New entry |
| Majority | | 3,431 | 6.19 | |
| Turnout | | 55,461 | 74.79 | |
| Registered electors | | | | |
| SAD hold | | Swing | | |

Punjab Legislative Assembly Election, 1969: Raikot
| Party | Candidate | Votes | % | ±% |
|---|---|---|---|---|
| SAD | Jagdev Singh Talwandi | 26,438 | 54.70 | ▼6.59 |
| INC | Pal Singh | 20,981 | 43.41 | ▲7.48 |
| Independent | Babu Ram | 913 | 1.89 | New entry |
| Majority | | 5,457 | 11.04 | |
| Turnout | | 49,448 | | |
| Registered electors | | | | |
| SAD gain from Akali Dal (SFS) | | Swing | | |

Punjab Legislative Assembly Election, 1967: Raikot
| Party | Candidate | Votes | % | ±% |
|---|---|---|---|---|
| Akali Dal (SFS) | Jagdev Singh Talwandi | 28,912 | 61.29 | |
| INC | Satwant Singh | 16,947 | 35.93 | |
| Majority | | 11,965 | 24.74 | |
| Turnout | | 48,357 | | |
| Registered electors | | | | |
| Akali Dal (SFS) gain from SAD | | Swing | | |

== See also ==
- Ranjit Singh Talwandi
- Raikot
