= Dev Raj Singh Talwandi =

Indian politician

Master Dev Raj Singh Talwandi

Member of the Punjab Legislative Assembly, Punjab
- In office 1977–1980
- Preceded by: Jagdev Singh Talwandi
- Succeeded by: Jagdev Singh
- Constituency: Raikot

Personal details
- Born: 5 February 1926 Lyallpur, Punjab, British India
- Party: Shiromani Akali Dal
- Spouse: Nasib Kaur
- Children: 3
- Relatives: Jagdev Singh Talwandi (brother)

Dev Raj Singh Talwandi (born 1926) was an Indian politician. He was elected as Member of the Punjab Legislative Assembly from Raikot in 1977. He is the brother of Jagdev Singh Talwandi, the former president of Shiromani Gurdwara Parbandhak Committee and Shiromani Akali Dal.

== Electoral performance ==
Punjab Legislative Assembly Election, 1977: Raikot
Party	Candidate	Votes	%	±%
SAD	Dev Raj Singh Talwandi	25,666	49.20	▲1.54
INC	Gurcharan Singh	21,528	41.27	▼0.22
Independent	Gurdial Singh	3,674	7.04	New entry
Majority		4,138	7.93	
Turnout		52,167	65.52	
Registered electors				
SAD hold		Swing		
