= Sukhdev Singh Libra =

Indian politician (1932–2019)

Member of Lok Sabha
- In office 2009–2014
- Succeeded by: Harinder Singh Khalsa
- Constituency: Fatehgarh Sahib
- In office 2004–2009
- Constituency: Ropar

Member of Rajya Sabha
- In office 1998–2004

Personal details
- Born: 7 November 1932 Ludhiana, Punjab, British India
- Died: 6 September 2019 (aged 86) Khanna, Punjab, India
- Party: Indian National Congress
- Other party: Shiromani Akali Dal
- Spouse: Surjit Kaur
- Children: 6

Sukhdev Singh Libra (7 November 1932 – 6 September 2019) was an Indian politician and Member of Parliament.

== Early life ==
He was born on 7 November 1932 in a Ramdasia family to Sardar Kartar Singh and Chand Kaur at Libra village, Khanna, Punjab.

== Politics ==
In 1985 he became a member of the Legislative Assembly Punjab and Member of Rajya Sabha in 1998.

In 2004, he became member of the 14th Lok Sabha from Ropar Constituency.

In 2008, he represented the Fatehgarh Sahib constituency.

He also served as chairman of Scheduled Castes Welfare Corporation (Punjab), member of Shiromani Gurudwara Prabandhak Committee (SGPC) and Board Gurdwara Sahib Sach Khand Shri Abchal Nagar Hazur Sahib Nanded, Maharashtra.

He died due to prolonged illness at his ancestral village in Khanna.
