= Ranjit Singh Talwandi =

Indian politician (1956–2023)

- ਰਣਜੀਤ ਸਿੰਘ ਤਲਵੰਡੀ
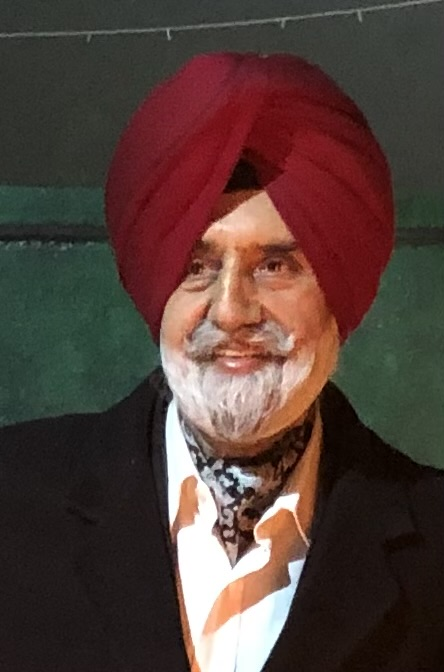
- Talwandi in 2021

Member of the Punjab Legislative Assembly, Punjab
- In office 2002–2007
- Constituency: Raikot

Secretary General of Shiromani Akali Dal (Sanyukt)
- Incumbent
- Assumed office 26 September 2021
- Preceded by: Post established

Chairman of Punjab Small Scale Industries and Exports Corporation (PSIEC)
- In office 1997–2002

Personal details
- Born: 3 July 1956
- Died: 5 December 2023 (aged 67) Chandigarh, India
- Party: Shiromani Akali Dal (Sanyukt)
- Other political affiliations: Shiromani Akali Dal (till 2020)
- Spouse: Sartaj Kaur
- Children: 1 son and 1 daughter
- Parents: Jagdev Singh Talwandi (father); Mohinder Kaur (mother)
- Website: Ranjit Singh Talwandi on Facebook

Ranjit Singh Talwandi (Punjabi: ਰਣਜੀਤ ਸਿੰਘ ਤਲਵੰਡੀ; 3 July 1956 – 5 December 2023) was an Indian politician who was the Secretary General of Shiromani Akali Dal (Sanyukt). He served as Member of the Punjab Legislative Assembly from Raikot (2002–2007). He was son of Jagdev Singh Talwandi, former president of Shiromani Gurdwara Parbandhak Committee and Shiromani Akali Dal.

== Personal life ==
Talwandi was born on 3 July 1956, to father Jagdev Singh Talwandi and mother Mohinder Kaur. He had three siblings, including SGPC member Jagjit Singh Talwandi and Shiromai Akali Dal (Sanyukt) Women's Wing President Harjit Kaur Talwandi. His son Jagteshwar Singh died in a car accident in 2015.

Ranjit Singh Talwandi died on 5 December 2023 at the Postgraduate Institute of Medical Education and Research (PGIMER) in Chandigarh, where he had been being treated for a prolonged illness. He was 67.

== Political career ==
Talwandi contested his first election in 1997 from Raikot, and was elected in 2002 from same constituency. He also served as Chairman of Punjab Small Industries and Exports Corporation (PSIEC). In 2017, during campaigning for assembly elections, former Deputy Minister of Punjab Sukhbir Singh Badal promised ministry to Talwandi at a rally in Khanna. In July 2020, he joined Shiromani Akali Dal (Democratic), which later merged into Shiromani Akali Dal (Sanyukt). In September 2021, he was appointed secretary general of the party. In October 2021, Talwandi was detained by UP Police, who left for Lakhimpur Kheri.

== Electoral performance ==
Punjab Legislative Assembly Election, 1997: Raikot
Party	Candidate	Votes	%	±%
INC	Harmohinder Singh Pardhan	38,297	42.66	▼17.85
SAD	Ranjit Singh Talwandi	34,245	38.14	▼1.35
BSP	Paramjit Singh Ranu	7006	7.80	New entry
Independent	Nirmal Singh	4198	4.68	New entry
CPI(M)	Rachhpal Singh	2421	2.70	New entry
Independent	Rajwinder Singh	2414	2.69	New entry
Independent	Hardev Singh Sandhu	957	1.07	New entry
SAD(A)	Talib Singh	244	0.27	New entry
Majority		4,052		
Turnout		89,782		
Registered electors				
INC hold		Swing		

Punjab Legislative Assembly Election, 2002: Raikot
Party	Candidate	Votes	%	±%
SAD	Ranjit Singh Talwandi	44,388	49.14	▲11.00
INC	Harmohinder Singh Pardhan	37,989	42.06	▼0.60
LBP	Avtar Singh Mullanpuri	3087	3.42	New entry
SAD(A)	Baldev Singh Bains	2483	2.75	▲2.48
BSP	Jagjit Singh	1226	1.36	▼6.44
Independent	Jagjit Singh	1150	1.27	New entry
Majority		6,399		
Turnout		90,323		
Registered electors				
SAD gain from INC		Swing		

Punjab Assembly election, 2007: Raikot
Party	Candidate	Votes	%	±%
INC	Harmohinder Singh	49,629	48.60	▲6.54
SAD	Ranjit Singh Talwandi	47,190	46.21	▼2.93
Independent	Rajwinder Singh	1,949	1.91	New entry
CPI(ML)L	Tarsem Singh Jodhan	989	0.97	New entry
Independent	Baljit Singh	869	0.85	New entry
BSP	Kulwant Singh	849	0.83	▼0.53
Independent	Tarlochan Singh	641	0.63	New entry
Majority		2,439		
Turnout		102,116		
Registered electors				
INC gain from SAD		Swing		

Punjab Assembly election, 2012: Khanna
Party	Candidate	Votes	%	±%
INC	Gurkirat Singh Kotli	45,045	38.36	
SAD	Ranjit Singh Talwandi	37,767	32.16	
PPoP	Gurpreet Singh	23,370	19.90	New entry
BSP	Navjot Singh Mandair	6,194	5.27	
SAD(A)	Mahan Singh	476	0.41	New entry
Majority		7,278	6.20	
Turnout		117,428	80.92	
Registered electors				
INC gain from SAD		Swing		

Punjab Assembly election, 2017: Khanna
Party	Candidate	Votes	%	±%
INC	Gurkirat Singh Kotli	55,690	44.29	▲5.93
AAP	Anil Dutt Phally	35,099	27.92	New entry
SAD	Ranjit Singh Talwandi	31,845	25.32	▼6.84
BSP	Shashi Vardhan	1,202	0.96	▼4.31
SAD(A)	Rajiv Vijan	446	0.35	▼0.06
NOTA	None of the above	850	0.68	
Majority		20,591	16.37	
Turnout		125,732	78.42	
Registered electors				
INC hold		Swing		

== See also ==
- Jagdev Singh Talwandi
- Raikot
- Khanna
