= 2002 Punjab Legislative Assembly election =

2002 Punjab Legislative Assembly Election
- 13 February 2002

All 117 seats to the Punjab Legislative Assembly 59 seats needed for a majority
- Turnout: 62.14% (▼6.59%)
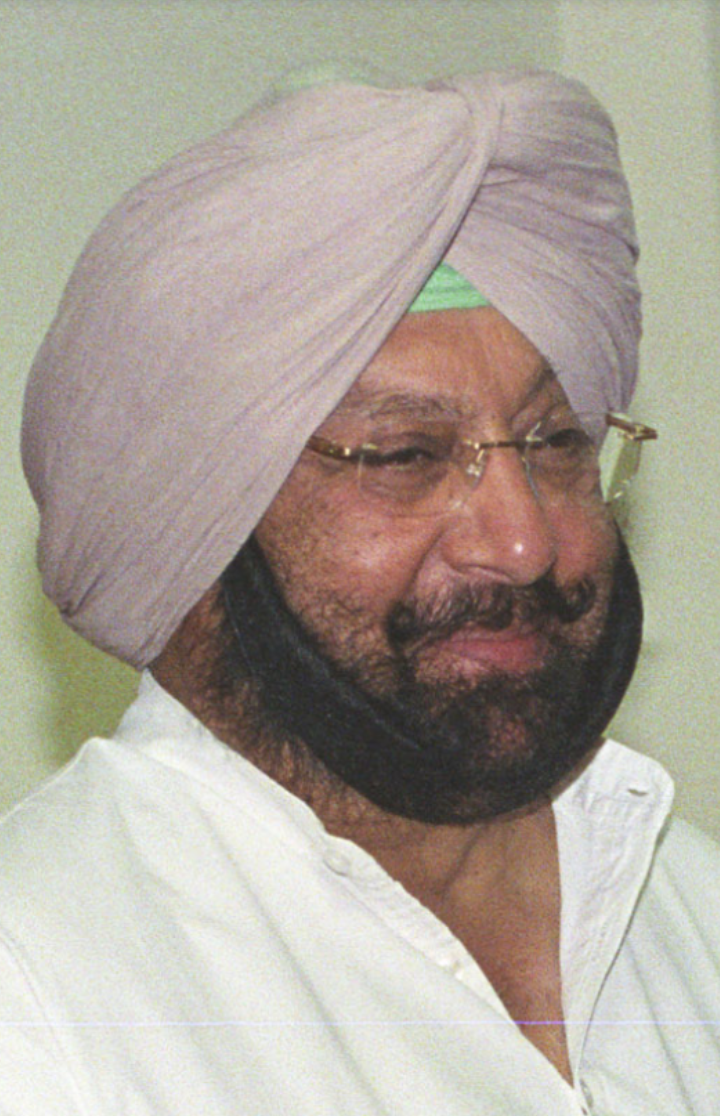

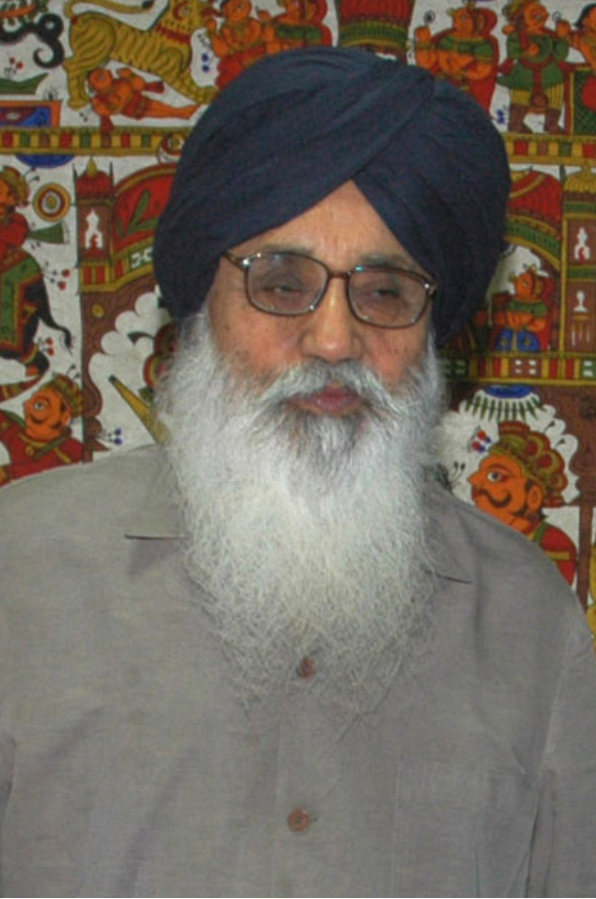
	First party	Second party
Leader	Captain Amarinder Singh	Parkash Singh Badal
Party	INC	SAD
Alliance	INC+CPI	NDA
Leader since	26 February 2002	1 March 1997
Leader's seat	Patiala	Lambi
Last election	14	75
Seats won	62	41
Seat change	▲48	▼34
Popular vote	5,572,643	4,828,612
Percentage	40.11%	34.76%
Swing	▲13.8%	▼11.3%
Chief Minister before election
Parkash Singh Badal
SAD
Elected Chief Minister
Amarinder Singh
INC

Punjab Legislative Assembly election, 2002 was held in Indian state of Punjab in 2002, to elect 117 members to the Punjab Legislative Assembly. Indian National Congress gained majority of the seats. Amarinder Singh was elected as the Chief Minister.

== Parties and Alliances ==
United Progressive Alliance

No.	Party	Flag	Symbol	Photo	Leader	Seats contested	Seats Won
1.	Indian National Congress				Captain Amarinder Singh	105	62
2.	Communist Party of India					11	2

National Democratic Alliance

No.	Party	Flag	Symbol	Photo	Leader	Seats contested	Seats Won
1.	Shiromani Akali Dal (Badal)				Parkash Singh Badal	94	41
2.	Bharatiya Janata Party					23	3

== Results ==
Summary of results of the Punjab Legislative Assembly election, 2002
Party	Candidates	Seats	Votes	% of votes
Indian National Congress	105	62	36,82,877	35.8%
Shiromani Akali Dal	92	41	31,96,924	31.08%
Bahujan Samaj Party	100	0	5,85,579	5.7%
Bharatiya Janata Party	23	3	5,83,214	5.67%
Shiromani Akali Dal (Amritsar)	84	0	4,78,115	4.6%
Communist Party of India	11	2	2,20,785	2.15%
Total (Note: The total includes votes and contestants of all parties, even those who failed to win any seat)	923	117	10,284,686	

== Result by Region ==
Region	Seats					
Region	Seats	INC	SAD	BJP	CPI	OTH
Malwa	65	29	27	1	2	6
Majha	27	17	7	0	0	3
Doaba	25	16	7	2	0	0
Total	117	62	41	3	2	9

== Constituency wise Results ==
Constituency		Winner				Runner Up				Margin	%
#	Name (Note: SC and ST indicate constituencies reserved for Scheduled Castes and Scheduled Tribes respectively.)	Candidate	Party	Votes	%	Candidate	Party	Votes	%	Margin	%
1	Fatehgarh	Sukhjinder Singh	INC	46,739	53.56	Nirmal Singh	SAD	39,287	45.02	7,452	8.54
2	Batala	Ashwani Sekhri	INC	47,933	56.37	Jagdish Sahni	BJP	34,405	40.46	13,528	15.91
3	Qadian	Tripat Singh	INC	46,902	51.55	Natha Singh	SAD	39,948	43.90	6,954	7.65
4	Srihargobindpur	Balbir Singh Bath	SAD	27,836	41.27	Fatehjang Bajwa	IND	16,337	24.22	11,499	17.05
5	Kahnuwan	Partap Bajwa	INC	44,540	52.28	Sewa Sekhwan	SAD	37,735	44.29	6,805	7.99
6	Dhariwal	Sucha Chhotepur	IND	32,442	39.49	Sucha Langah	SAD	32,362	39.39	80	0.10
7	Gurdaspur	Khushhal Bahl	INC	35,442	44.26	Munawar Masih	SAD	23,751	29.66	11,691	14.60
8	Dina Nagar (SC)	Aruna Chaudhary	INC	36,765	48.05	Sita Ram	BJP	34,083	44.54	2,682	3.51
9	Narot Mehra (SC)	Rumal Chand	INC	32,107	44.70	Bishambar Das	BJP	21,594	30.07	10,513	14.63
10	Pathankot	Ashok Sharma	INC	45,073	56.93	Master Mohan Lal	BJP	27,709	35.00	17,364	21.93
11	Sujanpur	Raghunath Puri	INC	48,740	57.41	Satpal Saini	BJP	30,496	35.92	18,244	21.49
12	Beas	Jasbir Singh Gill	INC	45,832	50.61	Manjinder Singh Kang	SAD	39,382	43.49	6,450	7.12
13	Majitha	Swinder Singh	INC	41,072	49.40	Raj Mohinder Majitha	SAD	38,874	46.76	2,198	2.64
14	Verka (SC)	Raj Kumar Verka	INC	48,041	51.31	Dalbir Singh	SAD	38,651	41.28	9,390	10.03
15	Jandiala (SC)	Sardul Singh	INC	45,599	52.01	Malkiat Singh	SAD	37,866	43.19	7,733	8.82
16	Amritsar North	Jugal Kishore Sharma	INC	31,024	54.38	Baldev Raj Chawala	BJP	16,268	28.51	14,756	25.87
17	Amritsar West	Om Parkash Soni	IND	45,331	44.09	Amarjit Singh	CPI	21,791	21.20	23,540	22.89
18	Amritsar Central	Darbari Lal	INC	24,286	54.99	Laxmi Kanta Chawla	BJP	18,115	41.02	6,171	13.97
19	Amritsar South	Harjinder Thekedar	INC	23,322	36.82	Raminder Singh Bolaria	IND	19,232	30.36	4,090	6.46
20	Ajnala	Dr. Rattan Singh	SAD	47,182	46.12	Harpartap Singh	IND	46,826	45.77	356	0.35
21	Raja Sansi	Vir Singh Lopoke	SAD	42,238	49.38	Sukhbinder Sarkaria	IND	38,785	45.34	3,453	4.04
22	Attari (SC)	Gulzar Ranike	SAD	43,740	62.92	Rattan Singh	INC	19,521	28.08	24,219	34.84
23	Tarn Taran	Harmeet Sandhu	IND	30,560	38.93	Alwinderpal Singh	SAD	24,341	31.01	6,219	7.92
24	Khadoor; Sahib (SC)	Manjit Singh	SAD	37,200	53.54	Sukhdev Singh	INC	14,490	20.85	22,710	32.69
25	Naushahra; Panwan	Ranjit Singh	SAD	36,153	52.50	Jagir Singh	INC	30,219	43.88	5,934	8.62
26	Patti	Adesh Partap Kairon	SAD	44,703	55.17	Tarlok Singh	INC	23,324	28.78	21,379	26.39
27	Valtoha	Gurchet Singh	INC	39,064	50.44	Gurdial Singh	SAD	34,119	44.06	4,945	6.38
28	Adampur	Kanwaljit Singh Lally	INC	32,619	39.53	Sarabjit Singh Makkar	SAD	25,243	30.59	7,376	8.94
29	Jullundur; Cantonment	Gurkanwal Kaur	INC	29,160	43.97	Paramjit Singh	SAD	18,307	27.60	10,853	16.37
30	Jullundur North	Avtar Henry	INC	41,856	64.49	Suresh Sehgal	BJP	19,489	30.03	22,367	34.46
31	Jullundur Central	Raj Kumar Gupta	INC	30,066	47.58	Manoranjan Kalia	BJP	22,355	35.37	7,711	12.21
32	Jullundur; South (SC)	Mohinder Singh Kaypee	INC	34,869	42.54	Chuni Lal Bhagat	BJP	24,046	29.34	10,823	13.20
33	Kartarpur (SC)	Chaudhry Jagjit Singh	INC	39,010	45.25	Charnjit Singh Atwal	SAD	34,887	40.47	4,123	4.78
34	Lohian	Ajit Singh Kohar	SAD	48,787	50.24	Brij Bhupinder Singh	INC	43,612	44.91	5,175	5.33
35	Nakodar	Amarjit Singh Samra	INC	39,216	45.98	Gurmeet Singh Daduwal	SAD	29,749	34.88	9,467	11.10
36	Nur Mahal	Gurbinder Singh Atwal	INC	35,610	41.18	Gurdip Singh	SAD	26,331	30.45	9,279	10.73
37	Banga (SC)	Tarlochan Singh	INC	27,574	34.80	Mohan Lal	BSP	23,919	30.18	3,655	4.62
38	Nawan Shahr	Parkash Singh	INC	32,667	32.29	Ram Kishan	BSP	27,321	27.01	5,346	5.28
39	Phillaur (SC)	Santokh Chaudhary	INC	33,570	38.68	Sarwan Singh	SAD	28,915	33.32	4,655	5.36
40	Bholath	Jagir Kaur	SAD	41,937	55.39	Sukhpal Singh	INC	30,559	40.36	11,378	15.03
41	Kapurthala	Rana Gurjeet Singh	INC	33,715	46.98	Raghbir Singh	SAD	23,590	32.87	10,125	14.11
42	Sultanpur	Upinderjit Kaur	SAD	40,485	49.52	Rajanbir Singh	INC	34,971	42.77	5,514	6.75
43	Phagwara (SC)	Joginder Singh	INC	31,601	36.60	Swarna Ram	BJP	30,415	35.23	1,186	1.37
44	Balachaur	Nand Lal	SAD	33,629	41.80	Ram Kishan Kataria	INC	23,286	28.95	10,343	12.85
45	Garhshankar	Avinash Khanna	BJP	24,638	33.32	Shingara Ram Sahungra	BSP	18,463	24.97	6,175	8.35
46	Mahilpur (SC)	Sohan Singh Thandal	SAD	27,724	42.70	Avtar Singh Karimpuri	BSP	18,444	28.41	9,280	14.29
47	Hoshiarpur	Tikshan Sud	BJP	24,141	32.53	Naresh Thakur	INC	23,833	32.11	308	0.42
48	Sham; Chaurasi (SC)	Ram Lubhaya	INC	24,446	31.24	Mohinder Kaur Josh	IND	22,965	29.34	1,481	1.90
49	Tanda	Balbir Singh	SAD	37,354	46.75	Sangat Singh	INC	34,828	43.59	2,526	3.16
50	Garhdiwala (SC)	Des Raj	SAD	30,761	43.63	Pawan Kumar Adia	INC	22,860	32.43	7,901	11.20
51	Dasuya	Ramesh Chander	INC	38,718	49.74	Mahant Ram Parkash	BJP	26,635	34.21	12,083	15.53
52	Mukerian	Dr. Kewal Krishan	INC	43,579	46.16	Arunesh Shakar	BJP	34,516	36.56	9,063	9.60
53	Jagraon	Bhag Singh Mallah	SAD	32,152	34.94	Darshan Singh Brar	IND	30,595	33.25	1,557	1.69
54	Raikot	Ranjit Talwandi	SAD	44,388	49.14	Harmohinder Pardhan	INC	37,989	42.06	6,399	7.08
55	Dakha (SC)	Malkiat Singh Dakha	INC	51,570	44.25	Darshan Singh Shivalik	SAD	42,844	36.76	8,726	7.49
56	Qila Raipur	Jagdish Singh Gurcha	SAD	36,849	42.25	Gurdial Kaur Khangura	INC	30,270	34.70	6,579	7.55
57	Ludhiana North	Rakesh Pandey	INC	39,167	61.07	Pran Nath Bhatia	BJP	16,295	25.41	22,872	35.66
58	Ludhiana West	Harnam Dass Johar	INC	36,006	52.85	Avtar Singh Makkar	SAD	19,406	28.49	16,600	24.36
59	Ludhiana East	Surinder Kumar Dawar	INC	32,016	59.74	Sat Pal Gosain	BJP	18,767	35.02	13,249	24.72
60	Ludhiana Rural	Malkit Singh Birmi	INC	60,638	40.30	Amrik Singh Aliwal	SAD	30,535	20.29	30,103	20.01
61	Payal	Tej Parkash Singh	INC	42,282	48.91	Jagjiwan Pal Singh	SAD	34,681	40.12	7,601	8.79
62	Kum Kalan (SC)	Inder Iqbal Atwal	SAD	45,026	47.71	Ishar Singh	INC	42,420	44.95	2,606	2.76
63	Samrala	Amrik Singh	INC	43,845	50.57	Kirpal Singh	SAD	36,478	42.07	7,367	8.50
64	Khanna (SC)	Harbans Kaur	INC	41,578	48.44	Satwinder Dhaliwal	SAD	31,943	37.22	9,635	11.22
65	Nangal	Kanwar Pal Singh	INC	37,629	50.29	Madan Mohan Mittal	BJP	23,667	31.63	13,962	18.66
66	Anandpur Sahib	Ramesh Dutt Sharma	INC	41,950	50.62	Tara Singh	SAD	29,268	35.31	12,682	15.31
67	Chamkaur; Sahib (SC)	Satwant Kaur	SAD	33,511	45.63	Bhag Singh	INC	24,413	33.24	9,098	12.39
68	Morinda	Jagmohan Singh	INC	47,631	48.61	Ujagar Singh	SAD	24,914	25.42	22,717	23.19
69	Kharar	Bir Devinder Singh	INC	24,846	23.36	Balbir Singh	IND	23,326	21.93	1,520	1.43
70	Banur	Kanwaljit Singh	SAD	51,002	48.10	Sheelam Sohi	INC	50,288	47.43	714	0.67
71	Rajpura	Raj Khurana	INC	47,472	52.54	Balram Ji Dass	BJP	30,726	34.01	16,746	18.53
72	Ghanaur	Jasjit Singh	INC	40,945	46.27	Ajaib Singh	SAD	29,357	33.18	11,588	13.09
73	Dakala	Lal Singh	INC	38,424	37.33	Charanjit Walia	SAD	22,597	21.95	15,827	15.38
74	Shutrana (SC)	Nirmal Singh	SAD	34,123	35.05	Hamir Singh	IND	18,567	19.07	15,556	15.98
75	Samana	Surjit Singh Rakhra	SAD	46,681	39.32	Brahm Mohindra	INC	35,909	30.25	10,772	9.07
76	Patiala Town	Amarinder Singh	INC	46,750	74.47	Sarup Singh Sehgal	SAD	13,167	20.97	33,583	53.50
77	Nabha	Randeep Singh	INC	37,453	34.82	Narinder Singh	SAD	23,502	21.85	13,951	12.97
78	Amloh (SC)	Sadhu Singh	INC	45,383	45.50	Gurdev Singh	SAD	26,633	26.70	18,750	18.80
79	Sirhind	Dr. Harbans Lal	INC	35,659	37.51	Didar Singh Bhatti	SAD	32,528	34.22	3,131	3.29
80	Dhuri	Gaganjit Singh	SAD	25,538	26.57	Iqbal Singh	SAD(A)	23,979	24.95	1,559	1.62
81	Malerkotla	Razia Sultana	INC	37,557	34.78	Ajit Singh	IND	37,378	34.61	179	0.17
82	Sherpur (SC)	Gobind Singh	IND	30,132	33.16	Piara Singh	SAD	26,525	29.19	3,607	3.97
83	Barnala	Malkit Singh Keetu	SAD	37,575	38.21	Surinder Pal Singh	INC	21,305	21.67	16,270	16.54
84	Bhadaur (SC)	Balbir Singh Ghunas	SAD	43,558	50.54	Surinder Kaur	INC	20,471	23.75	23,087	26.79
85	Dhanaula	Gobind Singh	SAD	31,007	33.24	Jagjit Singh	INC	22,514	24.14	8,493	9.10
86	Sangrur	Arvind Khanna	INC	42,339	44.20	Ranjit Singh Balian	IND	23,207	24.23	19,132	19.97
87	Dirbha	Surjit Singh Dhiman	IND	35,099	36.58	Baldev Singh Mann	SAD	34,103	35.54	996	1.04
88	Sunam	Parminder Singh	SAD	44,506	45.14	Sonia Deepa Arora	INC	25,831	26.20	18,675	18.94
89	Lehra	Rajinder Kaur	INC	43,579	46.01	Naranjan Singh	SAD	28,071	29.64	15,508	16.37
90	Balluana (SC)	Parkash Singh Bhatti	INC	41,683	49.15	Gurtej Singh	SAD	37,363	44.06	4,320	5.09
91	Abohar	Sunil Jakhar	INC	37,552	39.10	Sudhir Nagpal	IND	30,213	31.46	7,339	7.64
92	Fazilka	Mohinder Kumar	INC	51,033	55.23	Surjit Kumar	BJP	37,178	40.24	13,855	14.99
93	Jalalabad	Hans Raj Josan	INC	45,727	38.79	Sher Singh Ghubaya	SAD	41,396	35.12	4,331	3.67
94	Guru Har Sahai	Gurmit Singh	INC	42,135	39.09	Paramjit Singh	SAD	36,704	34.05	5,431	5.04
95	Firozepur	Sukhpal Singh	BJP	34,995	39.73	Balmukand Sharma	INC	27,238	30.92	7,757	8.81
96	Firozepur; Cantonment	Ravinder Singh	INC	47,077	53.73	Janmeja Singh	SAD	38,046	43.42	9,031	10.31
97	Zira	Hari Singh	SAD	43,991	43.78	Kuldeep Singh	INC	36,424	36.25	7,567	7.53
98	Dharamkot (SC)	Sital Singh	SAD	35,729	40.97	Mukhtiar Singh	IND	20,200	23.16	15,529	17.81
99	Moga	Tota Singh	SAD	42,579	47.91	Sathi Vijay Kumar	INC	42,274	47.56	305	0.35
100	Bagha Purana	Sadhu Singh Rajeana	SAD	47,425	49.11	Maheshinder Singh	INC	42,378	43.88	5,047	5.23
101	Nihal Singh; Wala (SC)	Zora Singh	SAD	35,556	44.21	Ajaib Singh	CPI	16,729	20.80	18,827	23.41
102	Panjgrain (SC)	Gurdev Badal	SAD	43,811	48.86	Darshan Singh	CPI	22,374	24.95	21,437	23.91
103	Kot Kapura	Mantar Singh	SAD	42,725	39.90	Prof. Vibha Sharma	INC	40,986	38.28	1,739	1.62
104	Faridkot	Kushaldeep Dhillon	SAD	57,282	49.96	Avtar Singh Brar	INC	51,011	44.49	6,271	5.47
105	Muktsar	Sukhdarshan Singh	IND	32,465	33.36	Harcharan Singh	INC	32,265	33.15	200	0.21
106	Giddar Baha	Manpreet Badal	SAD	59,336	55.53	Raghuveer Singh	INC	43,801	40.99	15,535	14.54
107	Malout (SC)	Nathu Ram	CPI	46,180	51.24	Mukhtiar Kaur	SAD	39,571	43.90	6,609	7.34
108	Lambi	Parkash Singh Badal	SAD	50,545	54.21	Maheshinder Singh	IND	26,616	28.55	23,929	25.66
109	Talwandi Sabo	Jeetmohinder Singh	IND	29,879	31.60	Harminder Singh Jassi	INC	29,642	31.35	237	0.25
110	Pakka; Kalan (SC)	Gurjant Singh	CPI	34,254	40.11	Makhan Singh	SAD	32,477	38.03	1,777	2.08
111	Bhatinda	Surinder Singla	INC	46,451	40.62	Chiranji Lal	SAD	33,038	28.89	13,413	11.73
112	Nathana (SC)	Gura Singh	SAD	46,042	47.68	Jasmail Singh	INC	42,540	44.05	3,502	3.63
113	Rampura Phul	Gurpreet Kangar	IND	40,303	39.89	Sikander Maluka	SAD	37,644	37.26	2,659	2.63
114	Joga	Jagdeep Singh	SAD	41,077	43.66	Sukhraj Singh	INC	33,077	35.16	8,000	8.50
115	Mansa	Sher Singh	IND	27,826	28.75	Sukhwinder Singh	SAD	27,782	28.70	44	0.05
116	Budhlada	Harbant Singh	SAD	44,184	44.89	Hardev Singh	CPI	29,384	29.86	14,800	15.03
117	Sardulgarh	Balwinder Bhunder	SAD	49,281	48.57	Ajit Inder Singh	INC	48,186	47.49	1,095	1.08

== Bye Elections 2002-2007 ==
#	AC Name	No	Type	State	Winning Candidate	Party	Electors	Votes	Turnout	Reason
1	Ajnala	20	GEN	Punjab	Harpartap Singh Ajnala	INC	1,49,856	1,17,221	78.2 %	Resignation of Shri (Dr.) Rattan Singh
2	Garhshankar	45	GEN	Punjab	Lov Kumar Goldi	INC	1,19,404	78,733	NA	NA
3	Kapurthala	41	GEN	Punjab	Sukhjinder Kaur	INC	1,21,610	85,258	NA	NA

== See also ==
- Elections in Punjab, India
- 2002 elections in India
