= Fatehgarh Sahib Lok Sabha constituency =

Lok Sabha constituency in Punjab

Coordinates: 30.65°N 76.39°E

Fatehgarh Sahib PB-8
- Lok Sabha constituency
- Interactive Map Outlining Fatehgarh Sahib Lok Sabha constituency

Constituency details
- Country: India
- State: Punjab
- Assembly constituencies: Bassi Pathana; Fatehgarh Sahib; Amloh; Khanna; Samrala; Sahnewal; Payal; Raikot; Amargarh
- Established: 2008
- Reservation: SC

Member of Parliament
- 18th Lok Sabha
- Incumbent Amar Singh
- Party: INC
- Alliance: INDIA
- Elected year: 2024

Fatehgarh Sahib Lok Sabha constituency is one of the 13 Lok Sabha (parliamentary) constituencies of Punjab state in northern India. This constituency came into existence as a part of the implementation of delimitation of parliamentary and assembly constituencies in 2008.

== Assembly segments ==
The nine Vidhan Sabha (legislative assembly) segments of Fatehgarh Sahib Lok Sabha constituency are:

#	Name	District	Member	Party	Leading (in 2024)
54	Bassi Pathana (SC)	Fatehgarh Sahib	Rupinder Singh	AAP	AAP
55	Fatehgarh Sahib	Fatehgarh Sahib	Lakhbir Singh Rai	AAP	AAP
56	Amloh	Fatehgarh Sahib	Gurinder Singh Garry	AAP	INC
57	Khanna	Ludhiana	Tarunpreet Singh Sond	AAP	AAP
58	Samrala	Ludhiana	Jagtar Singh	AAP	INC
59	Sahnewal	Ludhiana	Hardeep Singh Mundian	AAP	INC
67	Payal (SC)	Ludhiana	Manwinder Singh	AAP	INC
69	Raikot (SC)	Ludhiana	Hakam Singh Thekedar	AAP	INC
106	Amargarh	Malerkotla	Jaswant Singh Gajjan Majra	AAP	AAP

Before delimitation, Amloh, Khanna and Samrala assembly segments were in Ropar, Payal was in Ludhiana and Raikot was in Sangrur. Bassi Pathana, Fatehgarh Sahib, Amargarh and Sahnewal assembly segments were created as a part of delimitation of assembly constituencies in 2008.

== Members of Parliament ==
Most Successful parties from Fatehgarh Sahib Lok Sabha
1. INC (3 Times) (75.0%)
2. SAD(A) (1 Time) (25.0%)

Year	Member	Party
Till 2008 : Constituency did not exist
2009	Sukhdev Singh Libra	Indian National Congress
2014	Harinder Singh Khalsa	Shiromani Akali Dal
2019	Amar Singh	Indian National Congress
2024	Amar Singh	Indian National Congress

== Election results ==
=== 2024 ===
2024 Indian general election: Fatehgarh Sahib
Party	Candidate	Votes	%	±%
INC	Dr. Amar Singh	332,591	34.14	▼7.61
AAP	Gurpreet Singh GP	298,389	30.63	▲24.25
BJP	Gejja Ram Valmiki	127,521	13.09	New
SAD	Bikramjit Singh	126,730	13.01	▼19.22
SAD(A)	Raj Jatinder Singh Bittu	43,644	4.48	
NOTA	None of the Above	9,188	0.94	
Majority		34,202	3.51	
Turnout		974,256	62.53	
INC hold		Swing	▼7.61	

=== 2019 ===
2019 Indian general election: Fatehgarh Sahib
Party	Candidate	Votes	%	±%
INC	Dr. Amar Singh	411,651	41.75	▲11.38
SAD	Darbara Singh Guru	318,161	32.23	▲1.89
LIP	Manwinder Singh Giaspura	142,274	14.43	New
AAP	Bandeep Singh Dullo	62,881	6.38	▼29.24
NOTA	None of the Above	13,045	1.32	▲0.94
Majority		93,490	9.52	▲4.27
Turnout		987,161	65.69	▼8.12
INC gain from AAP		Swing		

=== General election 2014 ===
2014 Indian general election: Fatehgarh Sahib
Party	Candidate	Votes	%	±%
AAP	Harinder Singh Khalsa	367,237	35.62	New
INC	Sadhu Singh	313,149	30.37	▼16.59
SAD	Kulwant Singh	312,815	30.34	▼12.52
BSP	Sarabjeet Singh Khalsa	12,683	1.23	▼6.58
NOTA	None of the Above	4,005	0.38	N/A
Majority		54,088	5.25	▲1.16
Turnout		1,031,030	73.81	▲4.40
AAP gain from INC		Swing	▲26.11	

=== General election 2009 ===
2009 Indian general election: Fatehgarh Sahib
Party	Candidate	Votes	%	±%
INC	Sukhdev Singh Libra	393,557	46.96	
SAD	Charanjit Singh Atwal	359,258	42.86	
BSP	Rai Singh	65,459	7.81	
SAD(A)	Kulwant Singh Sandhu	5,262	0.63	
IND	Lachchman Singh	5,123	0.61	
Majority		34,299	4.09	
Turnout		838,146	69.41	New
INC win (new seat)				

== See also ==
- Ropar Lok Sabha constituency
- List of constituencies of the Lok Sabha
