= Tarunpreet Singh Sond =

Indian politician

MLA, Punjab Legislative Assembly
- Incumbent
- Assumed office 2022
- Constituency: Khanna
- Majority: Aam Aadmi Party

Personal details
- Party: Aam Aadmi Party

Tarunpreet Singh Sond is an Indian politician and the MLA representing the Khanna Assembly constituency in the Punjab Legislative Assembly. He is a member of the Aam Aadmi Party. He was elected as the MLA in the 2022 Punjab Legislative Assembly election.

== Member of Legislative Assembly ==
He represents the Khanna Assembly constituency as MLA in Punjab Assembly. The Aam Aadmi Party gained a strong 79% majority in the sixteenth Punjab Legislative Assembly by winning 92 out of 117 seats in the 2022 Punjab Legislative Assembly election. MP Bhagwant Mann was sworn in as Chief Minister on 16 March 2022.

Committee assignments of Punjab Legislative Assembly

- Member (2022–23) Committee on Privileges
- Member (2022–23) Committee on Panchayati Raj Institutions

== Electoral performance ==
2022 Punjab Legislative Assembly election: Khanna
| Party | Candidate | Votes | % | ±% |
|---|---|---|---|---|
| AAP | Tarunpreet Singh Sond | 62,425 | 48.55 | |
| SAD | Jasdeep Kaur Yadu | 26,805 | 20.85 | |
| INC | Gurkirat Singh Kotli | 20,305 | 15.79 | |
| BJP | Gurpreet Singh Bhatti | 12,667 | 9.85 | New entry |
| SAD(A) | Parmjeet Singh Rinka | 3,936 | 3.06 | |
| NOTA | None of the above | 694 | 0.54 | |
| Majority | | 35,620 | 27.7 | |
| Turnout | | 128,586 | 74.74 | |
| Registered electors | | 172,035 | | |
| AAP gain from INC | | Swing | | |

State Legislative Assembly
| Preceded by - | Member of the Punjab Legislative Assembly from Khanna Assembly constituency 2022 – | Incumbent |
