= Jagtar Singh Jagga Hissowal =

Indian politician

Member of the Legislative Assembly
- In office 11 March 2017 – 10 March 2022
- Governor: V. P. Singh Badnore
- Preceded by: Gurcharan Singh Boparai
- Succeeded by: Hakam Singh Thekedar
- Constituency: Raikot

Personal details
- Born: 8 March 1974 (age 52) Hissowal, Punjab, India
- Party: Indian National Congress
- Other political affiliations: Aam Aadmi Party (till 2021)

Jagtar Singh Jagga Hissowal is an Indian politician of Indian National Congress and a former member of the Punjab Legislative Assembly from Raikot constituency.

== Personal life ==
Hissowal used to be a local teacher until he retired to throw his hat into the political ring. He has a non controversial marriage and two children.

== Political career ==
Hissowal won the 2017 on the Aam Aadmi Party ticket by defeating Congress candidate Dr. Amar Singh. He served as a member of the Committee of Local Bodies and Panchayat Raj Institutions in the Punjab Legislative Assembly. In November 2021, Jagtar Singh had switched over to the Congress party’s side in the Punjab Legislative Assembly and declared his support behind Charanjit Singh Channi to be Punjab’s new Chief Minister. Hissowal contested 2022 Punjab election from Jagraon but came in third place.

== Electoral performance ==
Punjab Assembly election, 2017: Raikot
Party	Candidate	Votes	%	±%
AAP	Jagtar Singh Jagga Hissowal	48,245	41.21	New entry
INC	Dr. Amar Singh	37,631	32.15	▼13.74
SAD	Inder Iqbal Singh Atwal	29,019	24.80	▼17.49
BSP	Surinder Singh	878	0.75	▼1.26
NOTA	None of the above	816	0.70	
Majority		10,614	9.06	
Turnout		117,046	77.81	
Registered electors		150,418		
AAP gain from INC		Swing		

Assembly Election 2022: Jagraon
Party	Candidate	Votes	%	±%
AAP	Saravjit Kaur Manuke	65,195	51.95	▲6.26
SAD	Shiv Ram Kaler	25,539	20.35	▼4.37
INC	Jagtar Singh Jagga Hissowal	20,878	16.64	▼10.05
SAD(A)	Parivar Singh Dalla	5,179	4.13	New entry
BJP	Kanwar Narinder Singh	4,476	3.57	New entry
NOTA	None of the above	1,057	0.84	
Majority		39,656	31.6	
Turnout		125,503		
Registered electors		184,819		
AAP hold				
