= Hakam Singh Thekedar =

Indian politician

MLA, Punjab Legislative Assembly
- Incumbent
- Assumed office 2022
- Preceded by: Jagtar Singh Jagga Hissowal
- Constituency: Raikot
- Majority: Aam Aadmi Party

Personal details
- Party: Aam Aadmi Party

Hakam Singh Thekedar is an Indian politician and the MLA representing the Raikot Assembly constituency in the Punjab Legislative Assembly. He is a member of the Aam Aadmi Party. He was elected as the MLA in the 2022 Punjab Legislative Assembly election.

== MLA ==
The Aam Aadmi Party gained a strong 79% majority in the sixteenth Punjab Legislative Assembly by winning 92 out of 117 seats in the 2022 Punjab Legislative Assembly election. MP Bhagwant Mann was sworn in as Chief Minister on 16 March 2022.

Committee assignments of Punjab Legislative Assembly

- Member (2022–23) Committee on Papers laid/to be laid on the table and Library
- Member (2022–23) House Committee

== Electoral performance ==
Punjab Assembly election, 2022: Raikot
Party	Candidate	Votes	%	±%
AAP	Hakam Singh Thekedar	63,659	56.04	▲14.83
INC	Kamil Amar Singh	36,015	31.70	▼0.45
BSP	Balwinder Singh Sandhu	8,381	7.38	▲6.63
Independent	Dr. Jagtar Singh	1,514	1.33	▲1.33
SAD(S)	Gurpal Singh Goldy	1,276	1.12	▲1.12
Independent	Baldev Singh (Dev Sarabha)	483	0.43	▲0.43
Independent	Rajpal Singh	376	0.33	▲0.33
NOTA	None of the above	1,232	1.08	
Majority		27644	24.34	
Turnout				
Registered electors				
AAP hold		Swing		

State Legislative Assembly
Preceded by -	Member of the Punjab Legislative Assembly from Raikot Assembly constituency 2022 –	Incumbent
