= Bhagwant Mann =

17th Chief Minister of Punjab since 2022

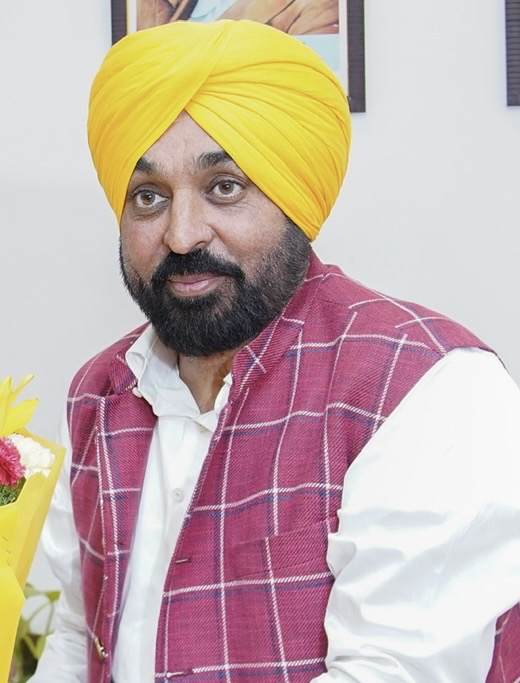
- Mann in 2026

17th Chief Minister of Punjab
- Incumbent
- Assumed office 16 March 2022
- Governor: Banwarilal Purohit; Gulab Chand Kataria
- Cabinet: Bhagwant Mann
- Preceded by: Charanjit Singh Channi

Convener of Aam Aadmi Party, Punjab
- In office 31 January 2019 – 22 November 2024
- Preceded by: Balbir Singh (caretaker)
- Succeeded by: Aman Arora

Member of Punjab Legislative Assembly
- Incumbent
- Assumed office 10 March 2022
- Preceded by: Dalvir Singh Khangura
- Constituency: Dhuri

Member of Parliament, Lok Sabha
- In office 16 May 2014 – 14 March 2022
- Preceded by: Vijay Inder Singla
- Succeeded by: Simranjit Singh Mann
- Constituency: Sangrur, Punjab

Personal details
- Born: Bhagwant Singh Mann; 17 October 1973 (age 53) Satoj, Punjab, India
- Party: Aam Aadmi Party (since 2014)
- Other political affiliations: People's Party of Punjab (2012–2014)
- Spouses: Gurpreet Kaur (m. 2022); Inderpreet Kaur (div. 2015)
- Children: 3
- Profession: Politician; social worker; comedian; singer; actor
- Musical career
- Also known as: "Comedy King"; "Jugnu"
- Genres: Comedy; satire
- Years active: 1992–2015

Bhagwant Singh Mann (born 17 October 1973) is an Indian politician, social worker, former comedian, actor and singer who is currently serving as the 17th Chief Minister of Punjab since 16 March 2022.

He represents the Dhuri constituency in the Punjab Legislative Assembly and is also serving as the state convener of Aam Aadmi Party in Punjab since 2019.

Previously, he served as a Member of Parliament in the Lok Sabha, the lower house of Indian Parliament from Sangrur from 2014 to 2022.

== Early life ==
Mann was born on 17 October 1973 in the Satoj village in Sunam tehsil of the Sangrur district of Punjab, India into a Sikh family. He completed twelfth grade at Govt. School at Chemma Village, Sunam.

== Acting career ==
Mann participated in youth comedy festivals and inter-college competitions. He won two gold medals at National Youth Festivals at the Punjabi University, Patiala for the Shaheed Udham Singh Government College, Sunam.

Mann developed comedy routines about typical Indian issues such as politics, business and sports. His first comedy album was with comedian Jagtar Jaggi. Together, they made a television program called Jugnu Kehnda Hai for Alpha ETC Punjabi. Ten years later, they parted ways. Mann then formed a comedy partnership with Rana Ranbir. Together, they made the television program Jugnu Mast Mast for Alpha ETC Punjabi. In 2006, Mann and Jaggi reunited and toured Canada and England with their show, No Life With Wife.

In 2008, Mann competed in The Great Indian Laughter Challenge on Star Plus, which increased his popularity.

He acted in the National Award-winning film Main Maa Punjab Dee, directed by Balwant Dullat.

Mann also acted in Jugnu Hazir Hai on MH One.

== Political career ==
In early 2011, Mann joined the People's Party of Punjab. In 2012, he unsuccessfully contested assembly elections in the Lehra constituency.

In March 2014, Mann joined the Aam Aadmi Party to contest elections in the Sangrur constituency. He fought his first Lok Sabha election against former union minister Sukhdev Singh Dhindsa and won by 211,721 votes.

=== Convener of AAP Punjab ===
In 2017, Mann was appointed the convener of AAP Punjab. In 2018 he resigned from the convener post after Arvind Kejriwal tendered an unconditional apology to Bikram Singh Majithia over Kejriwal's allegations about Majithia's involvement in the drug mafia case. He contested the 2017 Punjab Legislative Assembly election, from Jalalabad against Sukhbir Singh Badal and Ravneet Singh Bittu. He lost the elections to Badal by 18,500 votes.

In January 2019, Mann was appointed the convener of AAP Punjab for a second time. His political rivals had in past criticized him over alcohol use. Mann has denied these allegations. In 2019, during a party rally in Barnala, Mann announced that he had denounced alcohol and swore never to touch it again.

=== Member of Parliament ===
==== First term (2014–2019) ====
In May 2014, he was elected to the 16th Lok Sabha from Sangrur Lok Sabha constituency after defeating Sukhdev Singh Dhindsa from Shiromani Akali Dal. He received 533,237 total votes and won the election with a margin of 211,721 votes.

Parliamentary Committee assignments

- 1 September 2014 – 25 May 2019: Member, Standing Committee on Personnel, Public Grievances, Law and Justice.
  - Member of the Consultative Committee, Ministry of Rural Development, Panchayati Raj and Drinking Water and Sanitation
- 11 December 2014 – 25 May 2019: Member, Joint Committee on Offices of Profit

==== Second term (2019–2022) ====
In May 2019, Mann was re-elected to 17th Lok Sabha from Sangrur constituency in the 2019 Indian general election. He won his second term in the Parliament with a margin of 110,211 votes. He got 413,561 votes while contesting against Kewal Singh Dhillon from Indian National Congress and Parminder Singh Dhindsa from Shiromani Akali Dal. He was the only Member of parliament from Aam Aadmi Party in the lower house (Lok Sabha) of the parliament.

On 18 January 2022, he was chosen as the Chief Minister of Punjab candidate from the Aam Aadmi Party for the 2022 Punjab Legislative Assembly election. The selection was reportedly done by polling from the public and the results were declared by the party chief Arvind Kejriwal.

On 9 February, Mann raised issues about farmers in the Lok Sabha. The payment to sugarcane farmers for 2020–21 and 2021–22 had been pending. He appealed for clearing the due early along with interest. He asked for compensation for the losses in cotton farmers due to the pest attack. he asked that the Union government should recognize the farmers who died during the 2020–2021 Indian farmers' protest.

Parliamentary Committee assignments

- 13 September 2019 onwards: Member, Standing Committee on Food, Consumer Affairs and Public Distribution
  - Member, Consultative Committee, Committee on External Affairs

In 2021, the Parliamentary Committee on Food, Consumer Affairs and Public Distribution submitted a report to the Union Government recommending the implementation of the Essential Commodities Act, 2020. The Essential Commodities Act, 2020 was one among the three controversial 2020 Indian agriculture acts that led to the year-long 2020–2021 Indian farmers' protest. Mann publicly released his statement that was made during the Committee meeting on 5 June 2020. In his statement, Mann had raised concerns that these farm laws would increase hoarding. Removal of onions and tomatoes from the list of Essential Commodities would lead to price rise due to illegal stockpiling to increase the price and then selling at higher prices. This will create hardships for the poor. He also raised the issue of hoarding potatoes.

Mann contested the 2022 Punjab Assembly elections and won. AAP won a large majority of 92 out of total 117 seats. Mann was designated as the CM. Two days before taking the oath as CM of Punjab, Mann resigned from his post of MP Sangrur on 14 March 2022.

=== Chief Minister of Punjab (2022–) ===
On 18 January 2022, Mann was chosen as the Aam Aadmi Party (AAP) candidate for the Chief Minister of Punjab in the 2022 Punjab Legislative Assembly election, based on the party's public poll that overwhelmingly weighed in his favour.

On 10 March, the election results showed Mann as the winner from Dhuri Assembly constituency with a significant difference of 58,206 votes, and the next day he was elected as the leader of the AAP legislative party. The party itself went on to win 92 seats out of 117 in the state's assembly elections. Mann took the oath as the 17th Chief Minister of Punjab on 16 March 2022 at Khatkar Kalan, the ancestral village of freedom fighter Bhagat Singh.

==== Ending VIP culture ====
Even before taking the oath, CM designate Mann took steps to end the VIP culture and met the Director General of Police. The next day the police DGP in charge of security ordered the withdrawal of police security from 122 former MLAs and ministers. A total of 384 policemen involved in the security of those politicians were transferred to their parent unit. Mann had stated that the police force was needed for the security of the people and not VIPs. The security of former chief ministers was continued as they had been provided security on the instructions of the Union Home Ministry. AAP convener Arvind Kejriwal said Mann had "removed the security of old ministers and gave security to the public".

==== Employment ====
On 19 March 2022, during the first Cabinet meeting, Mann announced his decision to fill 25,000 job openings in various departments of Punjab government. 10,000 of those vacancies were in the Punjab Police.

On 22 March, he announced his decision to make the 35,000 employees in the state working on a temporary, contractual basis permanent government employees. He will bring a bill to the assembly to this effect. Announcing his decision he said, "I don't want these teachers protesting on the roads, I had promised to regularize their services if we are voted to power and I am fulfilling my promise."

On 5 September, Teachers' Day in 2022, he announced that payment of teachers from government institutions in Punjab will be according to UGC's Seventh Pay Commission from 1 October 2022.

==== Transportation ====
In June 2022, Mann announced Volvo bus service between IGI Airport and different Punjab cities of the state. The tariff charged by the PRTC and PEPSU buses for the airport were announced at half the rates being charged by the private bus operators. Mann said that this service would break the monopoly of a few families in the bus business with political links.

==== Language and culture ====
On 19 November 2022, while giving a speech at Guru Nanak Dev University to commemorate Punjabi Language Month, Mann announced a government policy to require all public signboards to prominently feature Punjabi over other languages. He encouraged citizens to change their signs before 21 February 2023, after which the government will begin enforcing the rule. He also exhorted educational institutions to begin adding specialized Punjabi language courses, citing his perceived decline in the proper use of Punjabi pronunciation and grammatical rules.

=== Dispute with the Akal Takht ===
On 15th June 2026, the Akal Takht declared Mann a Guru Dokhi (one who has betrayed the Guru) and Panth Virodhi (anti-sikh) over an objectionable video purportedly showing him in an act that hurt Sikh sentiments.

In 2026, Mann became involved in a dispute with the Akal Takht over a viral video that allegedly showed him behaving disrespectfully towards Sikh religious imagery. Mann denied that he was the person in the video and maintained that the footage was fake. He later appeared before the Akal Takht in connection with the controversy and supported an investigation into the video's authenticity.

The dispute continued amid conflicting claims over forensic examinations of the footage. On 15 June 2026, the Akal Takht declared Mann "Guru Dokhi" and "Khalsa Panth Virodhi", saying that he had misled the Sikh religious authorities over the matter. Mann continued to deny that he was the person shown in the video.

The controversy deepened after questions were raised over competing forensic reports concerning the video. Haryana Police subsequently arrested two men over the alleged attempt to procure a fabricated forensic report concerning the disputed video. The case was registered at police station following a complaint by a professional associated with digital forensics and cyber investigations. According to police, the complainant alleged that he had been approached to prepare a report supporting the claim that the video was AI-generated or manipulated. Mann disputed the allegations and claimed that forensic laboratory personnel had been intimidated into saying that they were paid to prepare a false report.

On 20 June, the Akal Takht released excerpts from a recording of Mann's earlier appearance before the religious authorities. The recording reportedly showed Mann repeatedly denying that he was the person in the viral video and agreeing to an investigation. Following the release, the Shiromani Gurdwara Parbandhak Committee called for his resignation.

The release of selected portions of the recording also drew criticism. Former acting Akal Takht jathedar Giani Harpreet Singh argued that publishing only excerpts could be misleading and called for the full context to be made public.

=== 2026 Punjab Assembly incident ===
In May 2026, opposition legislators accused Bhagwant Mann of attending a session of the Punjab Legislative Assembly while under the influence of alcohol and demanded that he undergo an alcohol test. The allegation led to protests and disruption in the Assembly. Mann rejected the accusation, while Aam Aadmi Party leaders described it as an attempt to defame him.

=== Allegations concerning alcohol use ===
In 2016, suspended Aam Aadmi Party MP Harinder Singh Khalsa complained to Lok Sabha Speaker Sumitra Mahajan that Mann, who was seated next to him in Parliament, attended the House after consuming alcohol. Mann denied the allegation. Contemporary reports said that the Speaker was examining complaints concerning the matter.

In September 2022, opposition parties alleged that Bhagwant Mann had been removed from a Lufthansa flight from Frankfurt to Delhi because he was intoxicated. Shiromani Akali Dal president Sukhbir Singh Badal, citing accounts attributed to co-passengers, claimed that Mann was unable to board the flight and that the incident contributed to a delay. The Aam Aadmi Party rejected the allegation as false and described it as political propaganda.

The airline stated that the flight had been delayed because of a delayed inbound flight and an aircraft change, rather than confirming the allegations against Mann. The incident drew further attention because Mann had publicly announced in 2019 that he was giving up alcohol.

=== Dispute over investigation into missing saroops ===
In 2025–26, Mann's government became involved in a dispute with the Shiromani Gurdwara Parbandhak Committee and Sikh religious authorities over the investigation into 328 missing saroops (copies) of the Guru Granth Sahib. The state government revived the matter and pursued an investigation into the circumstances surrounding the missing saroops, while the SGPC objected to what it viewed as government interference in Sikh religious affairs.

The controversy intensified after Mann publicly linked 169 saroops found at the Rasokhana Nabh Kanwal Raja Sahib shrine in Nawanshahr with the missing saroops case. The shrine management rejected the claim and said that it possessed records showing that its saroops were not part of the missing batch. The episode drew criticism from opposition politicians, who accused Mann of making an unsubstantiated claim and interfering in religious matters.

Amid the dispute, the Akal Takht permitted the SGPC to cooperate with the state investigation into the 328 missing saroops, while stating that such cooperation should remain limited to the case and should not be treated as acceptance of government interference in SGPC affairs.

== Electoral performance ==
=== Parliament: Lok Sabha ===
Year	Constituency	Party	Votes	%	Opponent	Opponent Party	Opponent Votes	%	Result	Margin	%
2019	Sangrur	AAP	413,561	37.4	Kewal Singh Dhillon	INC	303,350	27.43	Won	110,211	9.97
2014	Sangrur	AAP	533,237	48.47	Sukhdev Singh Dhindsa	SAD	321,516	29.23	Won	211,721	19.24

=== Punjab Legislative Assembly Elections ===
Year	Constituency	Party	Votes	%	Opponent	Opponent Party	Opponent Votes	%	Result	Margin	%
2022	Dhuri	AAP	82,592	64.29	Dalvir Singh Goldy	INC	24,386	18.98	Won	58,206	45.31
2017	Jalalabad	AAP	56,771	33.8	Sukhbir Singh Badal	SAD	75,271	44.82	Lost	−18,500	−11.02
2012	Lehra	PPoP	26,136	21.79	Rajinder Kaur Bhattal	INC	44,706	37.27	Lost	−18,570	−15.48

== Philanthropy ==
Mann began a non-government organization, the Lok Lehar Foundation, to aid children with physical deformities as a result of groundwater pollution in the border areas of Punjab.

== Personal life ==
Mann is a comic poet who writes political satire. He is also a volleyball player.

He was married to Inderpreet Kaur until their divorce in 2015. They have a son (Dilshan) and a daughter (Seerat).

At the age of 48, Mann married 32-year-old Gurpreet Kaur in 2022. She is a doctor by profession. They have a daughter, born in March 2024.

Addressing a rally in Barnala in January 2019, Mann said he had stopped consuming alcohol, on his mother's advice.

Maan's daughter Seerat accused him of physical abuse towards her and her mother, alcoholism, and habitual lying. She also said that she would refer to him as CM Maan.

On 11 May 2026, Mann's cousin, Gyan, joined the Bharatiya Janata Party.

== Discography ==
=== Comedy ===
Year	Album	Record label
2013	Kulfi Garma Garam 2	Amar Audio
2009	Just Laugh Baki Maaf	M Series
2007	Haas-Haas Ke	T-Series
2005	Bhagwant Mann Most Wanted	Creative Audio Productions
2004	Kee Main Jhooth Boliya	T-Series
2003	Sawdhan! Age Bhagwant Mann	T-Series
2002	Bhagwant Mann Full Speed	T-Series
2001	Bhagwant Mann Non-Stop	T-Series
2001	Bhagwant Mann Hazir Ho	T-Series
2000	Sadi Billi Sanu Miaun	T-Series
2000	Bhagwant Mann 420	Sun Music
1999	Lallu Kare Kawaliya	T-Series
1998	Gustakhi Maaf	T-Series
1997	Rukawat Ke Liye Khed Hai	T-Series
1997	Khariya Khariya	Tips
1996	Kursi Rani	Tips
1995	Jaagde Raho	Peritone
1995	Dhakka Start	T-Series
1995	Panj Duni Veeh	T-Series/MTL/AMC
1994	Koko De Bachhe; Mummy Daddy Murdabaad	T-Series; AMC United States
1994	Bol Madaari Bol	Peritone
1994	Mithiya Mircha	T-Series; MTL Canada
1993	Kulfi Garma Garam	T-Series; MTL Canada
1992	Gobhi Diye Kachiye Vaparanay	Creative Music Company

=== Musical ===
Year	Album	Record label
2011	Rangle Punjab Nu Bachayin	Eagle
2010	Aawaaz – The Voice	Point Zero
2001	Dam Lai Lo	T-Series
2000	Jattan Da Munda Gaun Lagia	Sun Music

== Filmography ==
Year	Film
2015	22g Tussi Ghaint Ho
2014	Police in Pollywood
2014	Moga to Melbourne Via Chandigarh
2011	Hero Hitler in Love
2010	Sukhmani – Hope for Life
2010	Ekam – Son of Soil
2007	Apne
2001	Sikandera
1998	Main Maa Punjab Dee
1996	Sukha
1995	Nain Preeto De
1994	Tabaahi
1994	Kachehri

=== Videography ===
Year	Album	Record label
2011	Chappa Chappa Charkha Chale	Eagle
2010	Jhanda Amli Kachahri Vich	Eagle
2009	Just Laugh Baki Maaf	M Series
2008	My Name is Mann	Eagle
2007	Pappu Da Dhaba	Eagle
2006	Punjabi Bluff Master	Eagle
2006	Pappu Baneya Neta	Eagle
2006	Pappu Bhaa Ji M.B.B.S.	Eagle
2005	Pappu Pass Ho Gaya	Eagle
2004	Kee Main Jhooth Boliya	T-Series
2003	Sawdhan Agge Bhagwant Mann	T-Series
2002	Bhagwant Mann Full Speed	T-Series
2002	Bhagwant Mann Non-Stop Vol 2	T-Series
2001	Bhagwant Mann Non-Stop Vol 1	T-Series
1999	Bhagwant Mann Hazir Ho	T-Series

Political offices
Preceded by Charanjit Singh Channi	Chief Minister of Punjab; 2022 –	Incumbent
Lok Sabha
Preceded by Vijay Inder Singla	Member of Parliament for Sangrur; 2014–2022	Succeeded by Simranjit Singh Mann
State Legislative Assembly
Preceded by Dalvir Singh Khangura (INC)	Member of the Punjab Legislative Assembly from Dhuri Assembly constituency 2022 –	Incumbent
Aam Aadmi Party political offices
Preceded by Office established	Candidate for Chief Minister of Punjab from the Aam Aadmi Party; 18 January 2022–present	Incumbent
Preceded by Office established	Convener; Aam Aadmi Party, Punjab – present	Incumbent
Preceded by –	Member of National Executive Committee; Aam Aadmi Party – present	Incumbent
Preceded by –	Spokesperson; Aam Aadmi Party – present	Incumbent
