= Darbara Singh Guru =

Indian politician

Principal Secretary
- In office 2007 - 2011
- Chief Minister: Parkash Singh Badal

Darbara Singh Guru is a retired bureaucrat of the 1980-batch Indian Administrative Service (IAS) of the Punjab cadre, known for his long career in public administration and later for his political involvement. He remained the Principal Secretary to former Chief Minister of Punjab, Parkash Singh Badal from 2007 to 2011.

== Biography ==
=== Early life and education ===
Guru was born to Pritam Singh into a Ravidassia caste in Bhadaur and pursued his education in the state before entering the Indian Administrative Service. He completed his Master’s degree in Physics (M.Sc.) from Punjabi University, Patiala, which laid the foundation for his academic and professional journey.

=== Bureaucratic career ===
Guru had a long and varied bureaucratic career as a 1980-batch IAS officer of the Punjab cadre. He served in several important administrative capacities in the state. Early in his career, he worked as Deputy Commissioner of Jalandhar, where he handled both developmental and law-and-order responsibilities. He later rose to senior positions in the Punjab government, holding diverse portfolios in governance, health, and public administration. His most prominent role came between 2007 and 2011, when he served as Principal Secretary to Chief Minister Parkash Singh Badal, making him one of the most influential bureaucrats in the state during that period. In this position, he oversaw policy implementation, coordinated between departments, and advised the Chief Minister on administrative affairs. Throughout his service, Guru was known for being a trusted aide to the political leadership, which enhanced his stature within the bureaucracy.

=== Political career ===
After retiring from the IAS, Darbara Singh Guru entered active politics with the Shiromani Akali Dal (SAD), leveraging his long administrative experience and close association with former Chief Minister Parkash Singh Badal. He first contested the 2012 Punjab Assembly election from Bhadaur (SC) constituency on an SAD ticket but lost, and later contested again in 2017 from Bassi Pathana (SC), where he was also unsuccessful. In the 2019 Lok Sabha elections, SAD fielded him from Fatehgarh Sahib (reserved) constituency, but lost to Amar Singh from Indian National Congress putting up a tough fight. Despite electoral setbacks, Guru remained a visible figure in SAD’s political strategies, often regarded as part of the party’s inner circle. At one point, he resigned from SAD, citing dissatisfaction, but he rejoined the party in 2023, reaffirming his loyalty to the Akali fold.

== Controversy ==
Guru's name was featured in the Punjab and Haryana High Court petition, accused of indiscriminate firing and killing of 4 Sikh youth in Nakodar in 1986. He was the officiating Deputy Commissioner for Jalandhar in February 1986 and also officiated as the District Magistrate. Following the sacrilege on Gurdwara Guru Arjan in Nakodar on 2 February 1986, Darbara signed the curfew orders for 3 February. He ordered the protesters to go to a different location where the police opened fire.

Darbara Singh Guru has denied any association with the killings.
