= Amar Singh (Punjab politician) =

Indian politician

Dr. Amar Singh Boparai

Member of Parliament, Lok Sabha
- Incumbent
- Assumed office 23 May 2019
- Preceded by: Harinder Singh Khalsa (AAP)
- Constituency: Fatehgarh Sahib

Vice President, Punjab Pradesh Congress Committee
- Incumbent
- Assumed office 2014

Chairman & Managing Director (Food Corporation of India)
- In office 2012–2012

Executive Director (Food Corporation of India)
- In office 2010–2012

Joint Secretary (Government of India)
- In office 2004–2010

Principal Secretary/Secretary (Government of Madhya Pradesh)
- In office 1997–2004

Personal details
- Born: 26 May 1953 (age 73) Boparai Kalan, Ludhiana, Punjab, India
- Party: Indian National Congress (since 2014)
- Relatives: Gurcharan Singh Boparai (brother)
- Education: M.A. Economics, MBBS
- Alma mater: Government Medical College, Amritsar and Barkatullah University

Amar Malkiat Singh Boparai is an Indian physician, bureaucrat and Member of Parliament for Fatehgarh Sahib constituency.

== Biography ==
Singh was born into a Ramdasia Sikh family of Malkit Singh and Gurdev Kaur from village Boparai Kalan in Ludhiana district. He is married to Kuldeep Kaur Dhillon and they have a two sons together. His father, Malkit Singh, used to run a shoe shop in Bhikhiwind before he and his wife were murdered.

== Career ==
He completed his MBBS at Amritsar Medical College. He was selected for Punjab Civil Medical Services (PCMS) and worked as a doctor in Samrala. After that, he joined the civil service as an IAS officer and served as secretary to Madhya Pradesh, CM, for 10 years. Dr. Amar Singh also served as the chairman and managing director of the Food Corporation of India (FCI), one of the largest organizations in India, which plays a crucial role in India's food security. As CMD of FCI, Dr. Singh would have been heavily involved in ensuring the efficiency of the procurement and storage systems, especially considering India's vast population and the seasonal nature of agricultural production. He would also have played a pivotal role in improving the PDS, ensuring that essential food items reached the most vulnerable populations across the country.

As a Joint Secretary in the Union Government, Dr. Amar Singh was one of the instrumental figures in the conceptualization and implementation of the Mahatma Gandhi National Rural Employment Guarantee Act (MGNREGA). This act, which came into force in 2005, guarantees 100 days of wage employment per year to rural households, providing a significant safety net for the rural poor. It aims to reduce poverty and improve rural infrastructure through wage-based work, helping millions of families across the country.

He joined Indian National Congress and was elected as a Member Parliament from Fatehgarh Sahib Lok Sabha constituency in 2019. For the 2024 Indian general election Singh is a Congress candidate for Fatehgarh Sahib Lok Sabha constituency.

Dr Singh was appointed as a member of a significant diplomatic initiative that took place in May 2025 following Operation Sindoor, which was a counter-terrorism operation launched by India. As part of the aftermath of this operation, the Indian government launched and sent overseas an all-party delegation. As a member of the delegate, Dr Amar Singh underlined the Indian parties' united political stance against terrorism. "When it comes to fighting terrorism, all political parties work together.

== Electoral performance ==
Punjab Assembly election, 2017: Raikot
Party	Candidate	Votes	%	±%
AAP	Jagtar Singh Jagga Hissowal	48,245	41.21	New entry
INC	Dr. Amar Singh	37,631	32.15	▼13.74
SAD	Inder Iqbal Singh Atwal	29,019	24.80	▼17.49
BSP	Surinder Singh	878	0.75	▼1.26
NOTA	None of the above	816	0.70	
Majority		10,614	9.06	
Turnout		117,046	77.81	
Registered electors		150,418		
AAP gain from INC		Swing		

2019 Indian general election: Fatehgarh Sahib
Party	Candidate	Votes	%	±%
INC	Dr. Amar Singh	411,651	41.75	▲11.38
SAD	Darbara Singh Guru	318,161	32.23	▲1.89
LIP	Manwinder Singh Giaspura	142,274	14.43	New
AAP	Bandeep Singh Dullo	62,881	6.38	▼29.24
NOTA	None of the Above	13,045	1.32	▲0.94
Majority		93,490	9.52	▲4.27
Turnout		987,161	65.69	▼8.12
INC gain from AAP		Swing		

2024 Indian general election: Fatehgarh Sahib
Party	Candidate	Votes	%	±%
INC	Dr. Amar Singh	332,591	34.14	▼7.61
AAP	Gurpreet Singh GP	298,389	30.63	▲24.25
BJP	Gejja Ram Valmiki	127,521	13.09	New
SAD	Bikramjit Singh	126,730	13.01	▼19.22
SAD(A)	Raj Jatinder Singh Bittu	43,644	4.48	
NOTA	None of the Above	9,188	0.94	
Majority		34,202	3.51	
Turnout		974,256	62.53	
INC hold		Swing	▼7.61	
