= Maheshinder Singh Grewal =

Indian politician

MLA, Punjab
- In office 1997 - 2002
- Constituency: Ludhiana West
- Chief Minister: Parkash Singh Badal

Personal details
- Born: 01-03-1950 Ludhiana Punjab, India
- Party: Shiromani Akali Dal

Maheshinder Singh Grewal is an Indian politician and belongs to Shiromani Akali Dal. He was accused by a lady judge from Ludhiana of misusing his power in her husband's transfer.

== Family and education ==
His father's name was Sardar Avtar Singh Grewal. He graduated from the Government College in Ludhiana.

== Controversy ==
A woman judge in Ludhiana, Lukhwinder Kaur, has accused the Punjab government and former minister Maheshinder Singh Grewal of high-handedness. She alleges that her husband, a Sub Divisional Officer, was transferred to pressure her after she summoned Grewal and co-accused in a criminal case. Kaur claims Grewal used political influence for the transfer, seeking the cancellation of the orders. She points out that her husband's transfer occurred unusually early, violating the state transfer policy of a three-year service period before relocation.

== Political career ==
Grewal was elected to the Punjab Legislative Assembly in 1997 from Ludhiana West constituency. He was made minister in the Parkash Singh Badal led government. He also served as Adviser to the Chief Minister.
