= Harinder Singh Khalsa =

Indian politician

Member of Parliament, Lok Sabha
- In office 2014–2019
- Preceded by: Sukhdev Singh Libra
- Succeeded by: Dr. Amar Singh
- Constituency: Fatehgarh Sahib
- In office 1996–1998
- Preceded by: Kewal Singh
- Succeeded by: Chatin S. Singh
- Constituency: Bathinda

Personal details
- Born: 12 June 1947 (age 79) Ludhiana, Punjab, British India
- Party: Shiromani Akali Dal (1998-2013, 2022-present)
- Other political affiliations: Bharatiya Janata Party (Mar. 2019 - Dec. 2020); Aam Aadmi Party (2013-2019)
- Profession: Politician, Social Activist

Harinder Singh Khalsa is an Indian politician. He served as a Member of Parliament (MP) from Bathinda during 1996-98 as a member of the Shiromani Akali Dal. In 2014, he joined the Aam Aadmi Party and was elected as an MP from Fatehgarh Sahib. He joined Bharatiya Janata Party in March 2019 but left the party in December 2020 to give his support to 2020–2021 Indian farmers' protest.

== Early life ==
Harinder Singh Khalsa was born in 1947, in Ludhiana, British India. His father Gopal Singh Khalsa belongs to Ramdasia Sikh who was an Akali Dal politician and served as the Chief Parliament Secretary of Punjab assembly in 1937, and was elected to the Punjab Legislative Assembly in 1952, serving as the leader of opposition. Harinder Singh obtained an M.A. (English) degree from the Government College, Ludhiana. He married Satwant Kaur on 8 February 1976. The couple has three sons.

== Pre-political career ==
Harinder Singh Khalsa started his career as an English lecturer at the G.G.N. Khalsa College, in Ludhiana. During his academic career (1964-1974), he published two textbooks: A Manual of General English and Social Science. In May 1974, he joined the Punjab Civil Service. In July 1974, he joined the Indian Foreign Service (IFS) and worked as a Second Secretary in Jakarta. Later, he served as a First Secretary in Bangkok and Norway.

In June 1984, while posted in Norway, he resigned in protest against the Operation Blue Star. As the Congress government filed some cases against him, he decided to stay in Norway, running a small eating joint and working as a postman in Norway. He returned to India in 1990, after being assured that the cases against him would be dropped.

During 1990-91, he served as the Chairman of Punjab Human Rights Organization, an NGO that highlighted the excesses committed by the state government during the anti-insurgency operations. During 1991-03, he served as a secretary of the Shiromani Gurdwara Prabhandak Committee (SGPC).

== Shiromani Akali Dal ==
Harinder Singh joined Shiromani Akali Dal, and was elected as an MP from Bathinda in 1996, winning by a margin of 92,229 votes. He was a member of the third National Commission for SC/ST under the Atal Bihari Vajpayee government.

== Aam Aadmi Party ==
In 2014, Harinder Singh joined the Aam Aadmi Party, and contested the 2014 Lok Sabha elections from Fatehgarh Sahib. He won by a margin of 54,144 votes. On 29 August 2015, he was suspended from AAP due to anti-party activities. He has denied any involvement in any such activities.

== Bharatiya Janata Party ==
On 28 March 2019 he joined Bharatiya Janata Party in the presence of Arun Jaitley.
