= People's Party of Punjab =

- Leader: Manpreet Singh Badal
- Founded: 27 March 2011
- Dissolved: 14 January 2016
- Merged into: Indian National Congress
- Headquarters: Malout Road, Gidderbaha (Mukatsar), Punjab, India
- Ideology: Sikh politics Secularism
- Political position: Centre
- Colours: Saffron
- ECI status: Registered Party

Election symbol

The People's Party of Punjab (PPP) was a Punjab-based Indian political party, founded by Manpreet Singh Badal in March 2011. After disagreements with the Chief Minister and his uncle Parkash Singh Badal, Manpreet resigned from the position of Finance Minister of Punjab, and later, from membership of the state assembly. In 2016, Manpreet announced the merger of the party with the Indian National Congress after meeting with party vice-president Rahul Gandhi.

== History ==
The People's Party of Punjab (PPP) had a short-lived existence. After its formation in March 2011, it contested the 2012 Punjab Legislative Assembly election. Following a non-impressive performance in 2012, it decided to dissolve the organizational structure in 2014 and make attempts to rejuvenate the party. The party forged an alliance with the Indian National Congress to contest the 2014 Indian general election with Manpreet contesting the Bathinda Parliamentary seat against Harsimrat Kaur Badal. In 2015, amidst speculation that it would merge with the Aam Aadmi Party, the PPP denied talk of its merger. Later, in 2016, the party was dissolved and it merged with the Indian National Congress.

== 2012 Punjab State Election ==
The 2012 state election was the first to be contested by the party. It allied with the Communist Party of India (Marxist), the Communist Party of India and the Shiromani Akali Dal (Longowal) in a group calling itself the Sanjha Morcha. Badal was the chief ministerial candidate of the coalition.

The Sanjha Morcha was unsuccessful in winning any of the seats it had contested despite garnering an approximate share of 6% of the total votes polled.

== Ideology ==
Unlike the Shiromani Akali Dal from where Manpreet Singh Badal and a majority of his followers came, PPP maintained a distance from Sikh political affairs, and aimed to emerge as a secular third-front alternative in Punjab politics, aligning with various left parties.
