= Punjab Council of Ministers =

Executive branch of the government of Punjab, India

This is a historical list of ministers who have served in the Punjab government. For a list of current ministers see Mann ministry and Departments of Government of Punjab, India.

List of the Departments arranged in alphabetical order.

Department	Ministry	Name	Term start	Term End	Party
Administrative Reforms	2nd Amarinder ministry	Amarinder Singh	16 March 2017	18 September 2021	Indian National Congress
Administrative Reforms	Channi ministry	Vijay Inder Singla	26 September 2021	11 March 2022	Indian National Congress
Administrative Reforms	Mann ministry	Bhagwant Mann	16 March 2022	5 July 2022	Aam Aadmi Party
Administrative Reforms	Mann ministry	Inderbir Singh Nijjar	5 July 2022	Incumbent	Aam Aadmi Party
Agriculture	2nd Amarinder ministry	Jatin Puri	16 March 2017	18 September 2021	Indian National Congress
Agriculture	Channi ministry	Randeep Singh Nabha	26 September 2021	11 March 2022	Indian National Congress
Agriculture	Mann ministry	Bhagwant Mann	16 March 2022	5 July 2022	Aam Aadmi Party
Agriculture	Mann ministry	Kuldeep Singh Dhaliwal	5 July 2022	Incumbent	Aam Aadmi Party
Animal Husbandry, Dairy Development and Fisheries	2nd Amarinder ministry, Channi ministry	Tript Rajinder Singh Bajwa	16 March 2017	11 March 2022	Indian National Congress
Animal Husbandry, Dairy Development and Fisheries	Mann ministry	Kuldeep Singh Dhaliwal	21 March 2022	5 July 2022	Aam Aadmi Party
Animal Husbandry, Dairy Development and Fisheries	Mann ministry		5 July 2022	Incumbent	Aam Aadmi Party
Civil Aviation	2nd Amarinder ministry	Amarinder Singh	16 March 2017	18 September 2021	Indian National Congress
Civil Aviation	Channi ministry	Charanjit Singh Channi	26 September 2021	11 March 2022	Indian National Congress
Civil Aviation	Mann ministry	Bhagwant Mann	16 March 2022	Incumbent	Aam Aadmi Party
Conservation of Land & Water	2nd Amarinder ministry	Amarinder Singh	16 March 2017	18 September 2021	Indian National Congress
Conservation of Land & Water	Channi ministry	Charanjit Singh Channi	26 September 2021	11 March 2022	Indian National Congress
Conservation of Land & Water	Mann ministry	Bhagwant Mann	16 March 2022	5 July 2022	Aam Aadmi Party
Conservation of Land & Water	Mann ministry		5 July 2022	Incumbent	Aam Aadmi Party
Cooperation	2nd Amarinder ministry, Channi ministry	Sukhjinder Singh Randhawa	16 March 2017	16 March 2022	Indian National Congress
Cooperation	Mann ministry	Harpal Singh Cheema	21 March 2022	5 July 2022	Aam Aadmi Party
Cooperation	Mann ministry		5 July 2022	Incumbent	Aam Aadmi Party
Defence Services Welfare	Channi ministry	Om Parkash Soni	26 September 2021	11 March 2022	Indian National Congress
Defence Services Welfare	Mann ministry	Bhagwant Mann	16 March 2022	5 July 2022	Aam Aadmi Party
Defence Services Welfare	Mann ministry		5 July 2022	Incumbent	Aam Aadmi Party
Economic & Statistical Organisation	2nd Amarinder ministry	Amarinder Singh	16 March 2017	18 September 2021	Indian National Congress
Economic & Statistical Organisation	Channi ministry	Charanjit Singh Channi	26 September 2021	11 March 2022	Indian National Congress
Economic & Statistical Organisation	Mann ministry	Bhagwant Mann	16 March 2022	Incumbent	Aam Aadmi Party
Employment Generation and Training	2nd Amarinder ministry	Manpreet Singh Badal	16 March 2017	20 September 2021	Indian National Congress
Employment Generation and Training	2nd Amarinder ministry, Channi ministry	Brahm mohindra	16 March 2017	11 March 2022	Indian National Congress
Employment Generation and Training	Mann ministry	Bhagwant Mann	16 March 2022	Incumbent	Aam Aadmi Party
Employment Generation and Training	Channi ministry	Rana Gurjeet Singh	20 September 2021	11 March 2022	Indian National Congress
Employment Generation and Training	Mann ministry	Bhagwant Mann	16 March 2022	Incumbent	Aam Aadmi Party
Excise and Taxation	Channi ministry	Manpreet Singh Badal	26 September 2021	11 March 2022	Indian National Congress
Excise and Taxation	Mann ministry	Harpal Singh Cheema	21 March 2022	Incumbent	Aam Aadmi Party
Elections	2nd Amarinder ministry	Amarinder Singh	16 March 2017	18 September 2021	Indian National Congress
Elections	Channi ministry	-	26 September 2021	11 March 2022	Indian National Congress
Elections	Mann ministry	Bhagwant Mann	16 March 2022	5 July 2022	Aam Aadmi Party
Elections	Mann ministry	Chetan Singh Jauramajra	5 July 2022	Incumbent	Aam Aadmi Party
Finance	Fifth Badal ministry	Parminder Singh Dhindsa	2012	2017	Shiromani Akali Dal
Finance	2nd Amarinder ministry, Channi ministry	Manpreet Singh Badal	16 March 2017	11 March 2022	Indian National Congress
Finance	Mann ministry	Harpal Singh Cheema	21 March 2022	Incumbent	Aam Aadmi Party
Food, Civil Supplies and Consumer Affairs	2nd Amarinder ministry, Channi ministry	Bharat Bhushan Ashu	16 March 2017	11 March 2022	Indian National Congress
Food, Civil Supplies and Consumer Affairs	Mann ministry	Lal Chand Kataruchakk	21 March 2022	Incumbent	Aam Aadmi Party
Food Processing	2nd Amarinder ministry	Om Parkash Soni	16 March 2017	26 September 2021	Indian National Congress
Food Processing	Channi ministry	Randeep Singh Nabha	26 September 2021	11 March 2022	Indian National Congress
Food Processing	Mann ministry	Bhagwant Mann	16 March 2022	5 July 2022	Aam Aadmi Party
Food Processing	Mann ministry		5 July 2022	Incumbent	Aam Aadmi Party
Forest and Wild Life Preservation	2nd Amarinder ministry	Sadhu Singh Dharamsot	16 March 2017	26 September 2021	Indian National Congress
Forest and Wild Life Preservation	Channi ministry	Sangat Singh Gilzian	26 September 2021	11 March 2022	Indian National Congress
Forest and Wild Life Preservation	Mann ministry	Lal Chand Kataruchakk	21 March 2022	Incumbent	Aam Aadmi Party
General Administration	2nd Amarinder ministry	Amarinder Singh	16 March 2017	18 September 2021	Indian National Congress
General Administration	Channi ministry	Charanjit Singh Channi	26 September 2021	11 March 2022	Indian National Congress
General Administration	Mann ministry	Bhagwant Mann	16 March 2022	Incumbent	Aam Aadmi Party
Governance Reforms and Public Grievances	Channi ministry	Manpreet Singh Badal	26 September 2021	11 March 2022	Indian National Congress
Governance Reforms and Public Grievances	Mann ministry	Bhagwant Mann	16 March 2022	5 July 2022	Aam Aadmi Party
Governance Reforms and Public Grievances	Mann ministry		5 July 2022	Incumbent	Aam Aadmi Party
Health & Family Welfare	2nd Amarinder ministry, Channi ministry	Om Parkash Soni	16 March 2017	11 March 2022	Indian National Congress
Health & Family Welfare	Mann ministry	Vijay Singla	21 March 2022		Aam Aadmi Party
Health & Family Welfare	Mann ministry	Bhagwant Mann			Aam Aadmi Party
Health & Family Welfare	Mann ministry	Chetan Singh Jauramajra	5 July 2022	Incumbent	Aam Aadmi Party
Higher Education and Languages	2nd Amarinder ministry	Tripat Rajinder Singh Bajwa	16 March 2017	26 September 2021	Indian National Congress
Higher Education and Languages	Channi ministry	Pargat Singh	26 September 2021	11 March 2022	Indian National Congress
Higher Education and Languages	Mann ministry	Gurmeet Singh Meet Hayer	21 March 2022	Incumbent	Aam Aadmi Party
Home Affairs and Justice	Fifth Badal ministry	Sukhbir Singh Badal	2012	2017	Shiromani Akali Dal
Home Affairs and Justice	2nd Amarinder ministry	Amarinder Singh	16 March 2017	18 September 2021	Indian National Congress
Home Affairs and Justice	Channi ministry	Sukhjinder Singh Randhawa	20 September 2021	16 March 2022	Aam Aadmi Party
Home Affairs and Justice	Mann ministry	Bhagwant Mann	16 March 2022	Incumbent	Aam Aadmi Party
Horticulture	2nd Amarinder ministry	Amarinder Singh	16 March 2017	18 September 2021	Indian National Congress
Horticulture	Channi ministry	Rana Gurjeet Singh	26 September 2021	11 March 2022	Indian National Congress
Horticulture	Mann ministry	Bhagwant Mann	16 March 2022	5 July 2022	Aam Aadmi Party
Horticulture	Mann ministry		5 July 2022	Incumbent	Aam Aadmi Party
Hospitality	2nd Amarinder ministry	Amarinder Singh	16 March 2017	18 September 2021	Indian National Congress
Hospitality	Channi ministry	Charanjit Singh Channi	26 September 2021	11 March 2022	Indian National Congress
Hospitality	Mann ministry	Laljit Singh Bhullar	21 March 2022	5 July 2022	Aam Aadmi Party
Hospitality	Mann ministry		5 July 2022	Incumbent	Aam Aadmi Party
Housing and Urban Development	2nd Amarinder ministry, Channi ministry	Sukhbinder Singh Sarkaria	16 March 2017	11 March 2022	Indian National Congress
Housing and Urban Development	Mann ministry	Bhagwant Mann	16 March 2022	5 July 2022	Aam Aadmi Party
Housing and Urban Development		5 July 2022	Incumbent		Aam Aadmi Party
Industries and Commerce	2nd Amarinder ministry	Sunder Sham Arora	16 March 2017	26 September 2021	Indian National Congress
Industries and Commerce	Channi ministry	Gurkirat Singh Kotli	26 September 2021	11 March 2022	Indian National Congress
Industries and Commerce	Mann ministry	Bhagwant Mann	16 March 2022	Incumbent	Aam Aadmi Party
Information and Public Relation	2nd Amarinder ministry	Amarinder Singh	16 March 2017	18 September 2021	Indian National Congress
Information and Public Relation	Channi ministry	Charanjit Singh Channi	26 September 2021	11 March 2022	Indian National Congress
Information and Public Relation	Mann ministry	Bhagwant Mann	16 March 2022	5 July 2022	Aam Aadmi Party
Information and Public Relation	Mann ministry		5 July 2022	Incumbent	Aam Aadmi Party
Information Technology	2nd Amarinder ministry	Amarinder Singh	16 March 2017	18 September 2021	Indian National Congress
Information Technology	Channi ministry	Gurkirat Singh Kotli	26 September 2021	11 March 2022	Indian National Congress
Information Technology	Mann ministry	Bhagwant Mann	16 March 2022	Incumbent	Aam Aadmi Party
Investment Promotion	2nd Amarinder ministry	Amarinder Singh	16 March 2017	18 September 2021	Indian National Congress
Investment Promotion	Channi ministry	Charanjit Singh Channi	26 September 2021	11 March 2022	Indian National Congress
Investment Promotion	Mann ministry	Bhagwant Mann	16 March 2022	5 July 2022	Aam Aadmi Party
Investment Promotion	Mann ministry		5 July 2022	Incumbent	Aam Aadmi Party
Jails	2nd Amarinder ministry, Channi ministry	Sukhjinder Singh Randhawa	16 March 2017	11 March 2022	Indian National Congress
Jails	Mann ministry	Harjot Singh Bains	21 March 2022	Incumbent	Aam Aadmi Party
Labour	2nd Amarinder ministry	Balbir Singh Sidhu	16 March 2017	26 September 2021	Indian National Congress
Labour	Channi ministry	Sangat Singh Gilzian	26 September 2021	11 March 2022	Indian National Congress
Labour	Mann ministry	Bhagwant Mann	16 March 2022	5 July 2022	Aam Aadmi Party
Labour	Mann ministry		5 July 2022	Incumbent	Aam Aadmi Party
Legal and Legislative Affairs	2nd Amarinder ministry	Amarinder Singh	16 March 2017	18 September 2021	Indian National Congress
Legal and Legislative Affairs	Channi ministry	Charanjit Singh Channi	26 September 2021	11 March 2022	Indian National Congress
Legal and Legislative Affairs	Mann ministry	Harjot Singh Bains	21 March 2022	5 July 2022	Aam Aadmi Party
Legal and Legislative Affairs	Mann ministry		5 July 2022	Incumbent	Aam Aadmi Party
Local Government	2nd Amarinder ministry	Navjot Singh Sidhu	16 March 2017	14 July 2019	Indian National Congress
Local Government	2nd Amarinder ministry, Channi ministry	Brahm mohindra	14 July 2019	11 March 2022	Indian National Congress
Local Government	Mann ministry	Bhagwant Mann	16 March 2022	5 July 2022	Aam Aadmi Party
Local Government	Mann ministry		5 July 2022	Incumbent	Aam Aadmi Party
Mines & Geology	2nd Amarinder ministry	Sukhbinder Singh Sarkaria	16 March 2017	26 September 2021	Indian National Congress
Mines & Geology	Channi ministry	Charanjit Singh Channi	26 September 2021	11 March 2022	Indian National Congress
Mines & Geology	Mann ministry	Harjot Singh Bains	21 March 2022	Incumbent	Aam Aadmi Party
Medical Education and Research	2nd Amarinder ministry	Om Parkash Soni	16 March 2017	26 September 2021	Indian National Congress
Medical Education and Research	Channi ministry	Raj Kumar Verka	26 September 2021	11 March 2022	Indian National Congress
Medical Education and Research	Mann ministry	Vijay Singla	21 March 2022		Aam Aadmi Party
Medical Education and Research	Mann ministry	Bhagwant Mann		5 July 2022	Aam Aadmi Party
Medical Education and Research	Mann ministry	Chetan Singh Jauramajra	5 July 2022	Incumbent	Aam Aadmi Party
New & Renewable Energy Sources	2nd Amarinder ministry	Amarinder Singh	16 March 2017	18 September 2021	Indian National Congress
New & Renewable Energy Sources	Channi ministry	Raj Kumar Verka	26 September 2021	11 March 2022	Indian National Congress
New & Renewable Energy Sources	Mann ministry	Bhagwant Mann	16 March 2022	5 July 2022	Aam Aadmi Party
New & Renewable Energy Sources	Mann ministry		5 July 2022	Incumbent	Aam Aadmi Party
NRI Affairs	2nd Amarinder ministry	Rana Gurmit Singh Sodhi	16 March 2017	26 September 2021	Indian National Congress
NRI Affairs	Channi ministry	Pargat Singh	26 September 2021	11 March 2022	Indian National Congress
NRI Affairs	Mann ministry	Kuldeep Singh Dhaliwal	21 March 2022	Incumbent	Aam Aadmi Party
Parliamentary Affairs	2nd Amarinder ministry, Channi ministry	Brahm mohindra	16 March 2017	11 March 2022	Indian National Congress
Parliamentary Affairs	Mann ministry	Bhagwant Mann	16 March 2022	5 July 2022	Aam Aadmi Party
Parliamentary Affairs	Mann ministry		5 July 2022	Incumbent	Aam Aadmi Party
Personnel	2nd Amarinder ministry	Amarinder Singh	16 March 2017	18 September 2021	Indian National Congress
Personnel	Channi ministry	Charanjit Singh Channi	26 September 2021	11 March 2022	Indian National Congress
Personnel	Mann ministry	Bhagwant Mann	16 March 2022	Incumbent	Aam Aadmi Party
Planning	2nd Amarinder ministry, Channi ministry	Manpreet Singh Badal	16 March 2017	11 March 2022	Indian National Congress
Planning	Mann ministry	Harpal Singh Cheema	21 March 2022	Incumbent	Aam Aadmi Party
Power	2nd Amarinder ministry	Navjot Singh Sidhu	June 2019	14 July 2019	Indian National Congress
Power	Channi ministry	Charanjit Singh Channi	14 July 2019	11 March 2022	Indian National Congress
Power	Mann ministry	Harbhajan Singh ETO	21 March 2022	Incumbent	Aam Aadmi Party
Printing and Stationery	2nd Amarinder ministry	Sadhu Singh Dharamsot	16 March 2017	26 September 2021	Indian National Congress
Printing and Stationery	Channi ministry	Razia Sultana	26 September 2021	11 March 2022	Indian National Congress
Printing and Stationery	Mann ministry	Bhagwant Mann	16 March 2022	5 July 2022	Aam Aadmi Party
Printing and Stationery	Mann ministry		5 July 2022	Incumbent	Aam Aadmi Party
Program Implementation	2nd Amarinder ministry, Channi ministry	Manpreet Singh Badal	16 March 2017	11 March 2022	Indian National Congress
Program Implementation	Mann ministry	Harpal Singh Cheema	21 March 2022	Incumbent	Aam Aadmi Party
Public Works	2nd Amarinder ministry, Channi ministry	Vijay Inder Singla	16 March 2017	11 March 2022	Indian National Congress
Public Works	Mann ministry	Harbhajan Singh ETO	21 March 2022	Incumbent	Aam Aadmi Party
Punjab Energy Development Agency	2nd Amarinder ministry	Amarinder Singh	16 March 2017	18 September 2021	Indian National Congress
Punjab Energy Development Agency	Channi ministry	Charanjit Singh Channi	26 September 2021	11 March 2022	Indian National Congress
Punjab Energy Development Agency	Mann ministry	Bhagwant Mann	16 March 2022	Incumbent	Aam Aadmi Party
Removal of Grievances	Mann ministry			5 July 2022	Aam Aadmi Party
Removal of Grievances	Mann ministry		5 July 2022	Incumbent	Aam Aadmi Party
Revenue, Rehabilitation & Disaster Management	2nd Amarinder ministry	Gurpreet Singh Kangar	16 March 2017	26 September 2021	Indian National Congress
Revenue, Rehabilitation & Disaster Management	Channi ministry	Aruna Chaudhary	26 September 2021	11 March 2022	Indian National Congress
Revenue, Rehabilitation & Disaster Management	Mann ministry	Brahm Shankar Jimpa	21 March 2022	Incumbent	Aam Aadmi Party
Rural Development and Panchayat	2nd Amarinder ministry, Channi ministry	Tript Rajinder Singh Bajwa	16 March 2017	11 March 2022	Indian National Congress
Rural Development and Panchayat	Mann ministry	Kuldeep Singh Dhaliwal	21 March 2022	Incumbent	Aam Aadmi Party
School Education	2nd Amarinder ministry	Vijay Inder Singla	16 March 2017	26 September 2021	Indian National Congress
School Education	Channi ministry	Pargat Singh	26 September 2021	11 March 2022	Indian National Congress
School Education	Mann ministry	Gurmeet Singh Meet Hayer	21 March 2022	5 July 2022	Aam Aadmi Party
School Education	Mann ministry		5 July 2022	Incumbent	Aam Aadmi Party
Science, Technology & Environment	2nd Amarinder ministry	Amarinder Singh	16 March 2017	18 September 2021	Indian National Congress
Science, Technology & Environment	Channi ministry	Gurkirat Singh Kotli	26 September 2021	11 March 2022	Indian National Congress
Science, Technology & Environment	Mann ministry	Bhagwant Mann	16 March 2022	5 July 2022	Aam Aadmi Party
Science, Technology & Environment	Mann ministry		5 July 2022	Incumbent	Aam Aadmi Party
Social Justice, Empowerment and Minorities	2nd Amarinder ministry	Aruna Chaudhary	16 March 2017	26 September 2021	Indian National Congress
Social Justice, Empowerment and Minorities	Channi ministry	Raj Kumar Verka	26 September 2021	11 March 2022	Indian National Congress
Social Justice, Empowerment and Minorities	Mann ministry	Baljit Kaur	21 March 2022	Incumbent	Aam Aadmi Party
Social Security and Development of Women and Children	2nd Amarinder ministry	Aruna Chaudhary	16 March 2017	26 September 2021	Indian National Congress
Social Security and Development of Women and Children	Channi ministry	Razia Sultana	26 September 2021	11 March 2022	Indian National Congress
Social Security and Development of Women and Children	Mann ministry	Baljit Kaur	21 March 2022	Incumbent	Aam Aadmi Party
Soil & Water Conservation	2nd Amarinder ministry	Amarinder Singh	16 March 2017	18 September 2021	Indian National Congress
Soil & Water Conservation	Channi ministry	Rana Gurjeet Singh	26 September 2021	11 March 2022	Indian National Congress
Soil & Water Conservation	Mann ministry	Bhagwant Mann	16 March 2022	Incumbent	Aam Aadmi Party
Sports and Youth Services	2nd Amarinder ministry	Rana Gurmit Singh Sodhi	16 March 2017	26 September 2021	Indian National Congress
Sports and Youth Services	Channi ministry	Pargat Singh	26 September 2021	11 March 2022	Indian National Congress
Sports and Youth Services	Mann ministry	Gurmeet Singh Meet Hayer	21 March 2022	Incumbent	Aam Aadmi Party
Technical Education and Industrial Training	2nd Amarinder ministry	Charanjit Singh Channi	16 March 2017	26 September 2021	Indian National Congress
Technical Education and Industrial Training	Channi ministry	Rana Gurjeet Singh	26 September 2021	11 March 2022	Indian National Congress
Technical Education and Industrial Training	Mann ministry	Bhagwant Mann	16 March 2022	Incumbent	Aam Aadmi Party
Tourism and Cultural Affairs	2nd Amarinder ministry	Navjot Singh Sidhu	16 March 2017	14 July 2019	Indian National Congress
Tourism and Cultural Affairs	2nd Amarinder ministry, Channi ministry	Charanjit Singh Channi	July 2019	11 March 2022	Indian National Congress
Tourism and Cultural Affairs	Mann ministry	Harjot Singh Bains	21 March 2022	5 July 2022	Aam Aadmi Party
Tourism and Cultural Affairs	Mann ministry		5 July 2022	Incumbent	Aam Aadmi Party
Transport	2nd Amarinder ministry	Razia Sultana	16 March 2017	26 September 2021	Indian National Congress
Transport	Channi ministry	Amrinder Singh Raja Warring	26 September 2021	11 March 2022	Indian National Congress
Transport	Mann ministry	Laljit Singh Bhullar	21 March 2022	Incumbent	Aam Aadmi Party
Vigilance	2nd Amarinder ministry	Amarinder Singh	16 March 2017	18 September 2021	Indian National Congress
Vigilance	Channi ministry	Charanjit Singh Channi	26 September 2021	11 March 2022	Indian National Congress
Vigilance	Mann ministry	Bhagwant Mann	16 March 2022	Incumbent	Aam Aadmi Party
Water Resources	2nd Amarinder ministry, Channi ministry	Sukhbinder Singh Sarkaria	16 March 2017	11 March 2022	Indian National Congress
Water Resources	Mann ministry	Brahm Shankar Jimpa	21 March 2022	5 July 2022	Aam Aadmi Party
Water Resources	Mann ministry		5 July 2022	Incumbent	Aam Aadmi Party
Water Supply and Sanitation	2nd Amarinder ministry, Channi ministry	Razia Sultana	16 March 2017	11 March 2022	Indian National Congress
Water Supply and Sanitation	Mann ministry	Brahm Shankar Jimpa	21 March 2022	Incumbent	Aam Aadmi Party
Welfare of Freedom Fighters	2nd Amarinder ministry, Channi ministry	Om Parkash Soni	16 March 2017	11 March 2022	Indian National Congress
Welfare of Freedom Fighters	Mann ministry	Bhagwant Mann	16 March 2022	5 July 2022	Aam Aadmi Party
Welfare of Freedom Fighters	Mann ministry		5 July 2022	Incumbent	Aam Aadmi Party

== Oath as the state chief minister/minister ==
I, <Name of Chief Minister/Minister>, do swear in the name of God/solemnly affirm that I will bear true faith and allegiance to the Constitution of India as by law established, that I will uphold the sovereignty and integrity of India, that I will faithfully and conscientiously discharge my duties as a Minister for the State of () and that I will do right to all manner of people in accordance with the Constitution and the law without fear or favour, affection or ill-will.
