= Samana Assembly constituency =

Legislative Assembly constituency in Punjab State, India

Coordinates: 30.16°N 76.2°E

Samana
- Constituency No. 116 for the Punjab Legislative Assembly

Constituency details
- Country: India
- State: Punjab
- District: Patiala
- Lok Sabha constituency: Patiala
- Total electors: 193,141
- Reservation: None

Member of Legislative Assembly
- 16th Punjab Legislative Assembly
- Incumbent Chetan Singh Jormajra
- Party: Aam Aadmi Party
- Elected year: 2022

Samana Assembly constituency is one of the 117 Legislative Assembly constituencies of Punjab state in India. It is part of Patiala district.

== Members of the Legislative Assembly ==
Most successful parties from Samana Vidhan Sabha
1. INC (9 Times) (47.4%)
2. SAD (5 Times) (26.3%)
3. IND (3 Times) (15.8%)
4. AAP (1 Time) (5.26%)
5. INC (I) (1 Time) (5.26%)

Year	Member	Party
As part of PEPSU Legislative Assembly (1951–56)
1952	Fateh Singh	Indian National Congress
1954	Pritam Singh	Independent
1954	Surinder Nath	Independent
As part of Punjab Legislative Assembly (1956–Present)
1957	Bhupinder Singh	Indian National Congress
1957	Harchand Singh	Indian National Congress
1962	Harchand Singh	Indian National Congress
1967	Bhajan Lal	Independent
1968	Gurdev Singh Bakshiwala	Indian National Congress
1969	Pritam Singh	Shiromani Akali Dal
1972	Gurdev Singh Bakshiwala	Indian National Congress
1977	Gurdev Singh Bakshiwala	Indian National Congress
1980	Sant Ram	Indian National Congress (Indira)
1985	Hardial Singh Rajla	Shiromani Akali Dal
1992	Captain Amarinder Singh	Shiromani Akali Dal
1997	Jagtar Singh Rajla	Shiromani Akali Dal
2002	Surjit Singh Rakhra	Shiromani Akali Dal
2007	Brahm Mohindra	Indian National Congress
2012	Brahm Mohindra	Indian National Congress
2017	Rajinder Singh	Indian National Congress
2022	Chetan Singh Jormajra	Aam Aadmi Party

== Election results ==
=== 2027 ===
Punjab Assembly election, 2027: Samana
Party	Candidate	Votes	%	±%
AAP	Surjit Singh Rakhra			
BJP	Chetan Singh Jormajra			New entry
AD (WPD)				New entry
INC				
BSP				
SAD				
NOTA	None of the above			
Majority				
Turnout				

=== 2022 ===
Punjab Assembly election, 2022: Samana
Party	Candidate	Votes	%	±%
AAP	Chetan Singh Jormajra	74,375	50.14	
SAD	Surjit Singh Rakhra	34,662	23.37	
INC	Rajinder Singh	23,576	15.89	
PLC	Surinder Singh Kherki	5,084	3.43	New
SAD(A)	Hardeep Singh	3,833	2.58	▲1.33
NOTA	None of the above	1,107	0.75	
Majority		39,713	26.77	
Turnout		148,335	76.8	
Registered electors		193,141		
AAP gain from INC				

=== 2017 ===
Punjab Assembly election, 2017: Samana
Party	Candidate	Votes	%	±%
INC	Rajinder Singh	62,551	41.90	
SAD	Surjit Singh Rakhra	52702	35.30	
SAD(A)	Rajinder Singh	1,854	1.25	▲0.73
NOTA	None of the above	1056	0.60	
Majority		9,849	6.60	
Turnout		1,48,174	83.60	
Registered electors		178,554		
INC gain from SAD				

== Previous results ==
Year	A C No.	Category	Winner Candidate	Party	Votes	Runner Up Candidate	Party	Votes
1957	110	ST reserved	Harchand Singh	INC	31274	Surinder Nath	IND	16470
1957	110	ST reserved	Bhupinder Singh	INC	29707	Pritam Singh	IND	12883
1962	143	SC Reserved	Harchand Singh	INC	23316	Pritam Singh	AD	21078
1967	82	SC reserved	Bhajan Lal	IND	14549	Hardial Singh	INC	12228
1968	98	GEN	Gurdev Singh Bakshiwala	INC				
1969	82	SC reserved	Pritam Singh	SAD	23520	Harchand Singh	INC	18282
1972	98	GEN	Gurdev Singh Bakshiwala	INC	18744	Gopal Singh	SAD	16710
1977	75	GEN	Gurdev Singh	INC	24580	Brij Lal	INC	18500
1980	75	GEN	Sant Ram	INC(I)	31933	Kirpal Singh	SAD	25248
1985	75	GEN	Hardial Singh Rajla	SAD	34626	Sohan Lal Jalota	INC	29973
1992	75	GEN	Amarinder Singh	SAD	Uncontested	--	--	--
1997	75	GEN	Jagtar Singh Rajla	SAD	65154	Brij Lal	INC	24858
2002	75	GEN	Surjit Singh Rakhra	SAD	46681	Brahm Mohindra	INC	35909
2007	74	GEN	Brahm Mahindra	INC	78122	Surjeet Singh Rakhra	SAD	75546
2012	116	GEN	Surjit Singh Rakhra	SAD	64769	Raninder Singh	INC	57839

== See also ==
- List of constituencies of the Punjab Legislative Assembly
- Patiala district
