= Balbir Singh (Punjab politician) =

Indian politician

Member of the Punjab Legislative Assembly
- Incumbent
- Assumed office 16 March 2022
- Preceded by: Brahm Mohindra
- Constituency: Patiala Rural

Cabinet Minister, Government of Punjab
- Incumbent
- Assumed office 7 January 2023
- Cabinet: Mann ministry
- Chief Minister: Bhagwant Mann
- Departments: Health and Family Welfare; Medical Education and Research; Elections
- Preceded by: Chetan Singh Jauramajra

Acting Convener of Aam Aadmi Party, Punjab
- In office 21 March 2018 – 31 January 2019
- Preceded by: Bhagwant Mann
- Succeeded by: Bhagwant Mann

Co-convener of Aam Aadmi Party, Punjab
- In office 21 March 2018 – 31 January 2019
- Preceded by: Aman Arora
- Succeeded by: Aman Arora

Personal details
- Born: 1957 (age 68–69) Patiala, India
- Party: Aam Aadmi Party
- Parent: Piyara Singh (father)
- Education: Panjab University, Chandigarh

Balbir Singh is an Indian politician from Punjab, who belongs to Aam Aadmi Party. He has taken the oath of cabinet minister of Punjab and given the portfolio of Health and Family Welfare, Medical Education and Research and Elections on 7 January 2023.

== Early life ==
Before entering politics, he retired as Associate Professor and is presently working as an Eye Surgeon at Patiala. He did his MBBS from Punjab University, Chandigarh in the year of 1979.

He also participated, at the young age, in JP Movement in 1974 and in 2011 Indian anti-corruption movement. Before 2014 Indian general election he joined Aam Aadmi Party.

== Political career ==
He served as the caretaker Convener of Aam Aadmi Party of Punjab after Party’s National Convener Arvind Kejriwal's apology from Bikram Singh Majithia. After the apology, both the Convener and Co-Convener of Party, Bhagwant Mann and Aman Arora respectively, resigned from their posts. Upon this, Balbir Singh was appointed the Co-convener and caretaker Convener of Party’s Punjab unit.

In 2017 Punjab Legislative Assembly election, Party announced him as candidate against Amarinder Singh from Patiala Rural Assembly constituency but he lost and stood at second place with more than 20,000 votes.

== Member of Legislative Assembly ==
He represents the Patiala Rural Assembly constituency as MLA in Punjab Assembly. The Aam Aadmi Party gained a strong 79% majority in the sixteenth Punjab Legislative Assembly by winning 92 out of 117 seats in the 2022 Punjab Legislative Assembly election. MP Bhagwant Mann was sworn in as Chief Minister on 16 March 2022.

Committee assignments of Punjab Legislative Assembly

- Member (2022–23) Committee on Privileges
- Member (2022–23) Committee on Local Bodies

== Electoral performance ==
Punjab Assembly election, 2017: Patiala
Party	Candidate	Votes	%	±%
INC	Amarinder Singh	72,586	68.98	
AAP	Dr. Balbir Singh	20,179	19.18	
SAD	Gen J.J. Singh	11,677	11.10	
HSS	Kshama Kant Pandey	291	0.28	
NOTA	None of the above	1,090	1.04	
Majority		52,407	49.31	
Turnout		1,06,436	67.00	
Registered electors		158,855		
INC hold		Swing		

Punjab Assembly election, 2022: Patiala Rural
Party	Candidate	Votes	%	±%
AAP	Dr. Balbir Singh	77,155	52.05	▲23.45
INC	Mohit Mohindra	23,681	15.97	▼31.33
SAD	Jaspal Singh Bitu Chatha	19,996	13.49	▼7.64
PLC	Sanjeev Sharma Bittu	11,887	8.02	New entry
SAD(A)	Mohinder Pal Singh	5,404	3.65	New entry
Independent	Saurabh Jain	3,080	2.08	New entry
Independent	Dhraminder Singh	1,071	0.72	New entry
NOTA	None of the above	771	0.52	
Majority		53,474	36.08	
Turnout		148,243	65.6	
Registered electors		226,033		
AAP gain from INC		Swing		

2024 Indian general election: Patiala
Party	Candidate	Votes	%	±%
INC	Dharamvir Gandhi	305,616	26.54	▼18.63
AAP	Balbir Singh	290,785	25.25	▲20.42
BJP	Preneet Kaur	288,998	25.09	New entry
SAD	Narinder Kumar Sharma	153,978	13.37	▼17.98
SAD(A)	Mohinder Pal Singh	47,274	4.10	
NOTA	None of the Above	6,681	0.58	
Majority		14,831	1.29	
Turnout		1,151,743		
Registered electors		1,806,424		
INC hold		Swing		
