= Channi ministry =

Ministry of State in India

- Ministry of Punjab
- Date formed: 20 September 2021
- Date dissolved: 11 March 2022

People and organisations
- Head of state: Governor Banwarilal Purohit
- Head of government: Charanjit Singh Channi
- Deputy head of government: Om Parkash Soni; Sukhjinder Singh Randhawa
- No. of ministers: 18
- Ministers removed: 1
- Total no. of members: 17
- Member parties: INC
- Status in legislature: 2/3rd Majority
- Opposition leader: Harpal Singh Cheema, Aam Aadmi Party

History
- Election: 2017
- Outgoing election: 2017
- Legislature term: 5 years
- Predecessor: Second Amarinder Singh ministry
- Successor: Mann ministry

The Charanjit Singh Channi ministry was the Cabinet ministry of Punjab headed by the Chief Minister of Punjab, Charanjit Singh Channi, India between the years 2021 and 2022.

The Fifteenth Punjab assembly was dissolved on 11 March 2022. The dissolution was necessitated after the results of the election was declared on 10 March.

A day after the election results announced in Punjab on 10 March 2022, Chief Minister Charanjit Singh Channi along with whole cabinet resigned from the government. New cabinet Mann ministry led by Bhagwant Mann of Aam Aadmi Party took oath of office on 16 March.

The following is the list of ministers with their portfolios in the Government of Punjab.

== Council of Ministers ==
SI No.	Name	Picture	Constituency	Department	Party
1.	Charanjit Singh Channi (Chief Minister)		Chamkaur Sahib	Conservation of Land and Water; Civil Aviation; Justice; Excise; General Administration; Hospitality; Tourism & Cultural Affairs; Mining and Geology; Investment Promotion; Information & Public Relations; Legal & Legislative Affairs; Personnel; Environment; Vigilance; Power; Other departments not allocated to any Minister shall vest with the Chief Minister	INC
Deputy Chief Ministers
2.	Sukhjinder Singh Randhawa (Deputy Chief Minister)		Dera Baba Nanak	Home Affairs; Cooperation; Jails	INC
3.	Om Parkash Soni (Deputy Chief Minister)		Amritsar Central	Health and Family Welfare; Defence Services Welfare; Freedom Fighters	INC
Cabinet Ministers
4.	Pargat Singh		Jalandhar Cantonment	Sports & Youth Affairs; NRI Affairs; Higher Education; School Education	INC
5.	Brahm Mohindra		Patiala Rural	Local Government; Parliamentary Affairs; Elections; Removal of Grievances	INC
6.	Tript Rajinder Singh Bajwa		Fatehgarh Churian	Rural Development & Panchayats; Animal Husbandry; Fisheries; Dairy Development	INC
7.	Sukhbinder Singh Sarkaria		Raja Sansi	Water Resources; Housing and Urban Development	INC
8.	Aruna Chaudhary		Dina Nagar	Revenue; Rehabilitation; Disaster Management	INC
9.	Manpreet Singh Badal		Bathinda Urban	* Finance: Taxation; Governance Reforms; Planning; Programme Implementation	INC
10.	Bharat Bhushan Ashu		Ludhiana West	* Food & Civil Supplies: Consumer Affairs	INC
11.	Gurkirat Singh Kotli		Khanna	Science & Technology; Information Technology; Industries and Commerce	INC
12.	Vijay Inder Singla		Sangrur	* Administrative Reforms: Public Works Department	INC
13.	Razia Sultana		Malerkotla	Social Security; Women & Child Development; Water Supply & Sanitation; Printing & Stationery	INC
14.	Amrinder Singh Raja Warring		Gidderbaha	Transport	INC
15.	Randeep Singh Nabha		Amloh	Agriculture and Farmers’ Welfare; Food Processing	INC
16.	Rana Gurjeet Singh		Kapurthala	Technical Education & Industrial Training; Employment Generation; Horticulture; Soil & Water Conservation	INC
17.	Raj Kumar Verka		Amritsar West	Social Justice; Empowerment and Minorities; New and Renewable Energy Sources; Medical Education & Research	INC
18.	Sangat Singh Gilzian		Urmar	Forests; Wild Life; Labour	INC

Political offices
Preceded by Second Amarinder Singh ministry	Government of Punjab; 2021–2022	Succeeded by Mann ministry
