= Lok Bhavan, Chandigarh =

Lok Bhavan, Chandigarh may refer to:

- Lok Bhavan, Haryana, official residence of the governor of Haryana, located in Chandigarh
- Lok Bhavan, Punjab, official residence of the governor of Punjab, located in Chandigarh
