= Fauja Singh Sarari =

Indian politician

Cabinet Minister, Government of Punjab
- In office 5 July 2022 – 7 January 2023
- Cabinet: Mann ministry
- Chief Minister: Bhagwant Mann
- Ministry and Departments: Freedom Fighters; Defence Services Welfare; Food Processing; Horticulture
- Succeeded by: Chetan Singh Jauramajra

MLA, Punjab
- Incumbent
- Assumed office 2022
- Preceded by: Rana Gurmit Singh Sodhi
- Constituency: Guru Har Sahai
- Majority: Aam Aadmi Party

Personal details
- Born: Guru Harsahai
- Party: Aam Aadmi Party

Fauja Singh Sarari also known as Fauja Singh Rana is an Indian politician and the MLA representing the Guru Har Sahai Assembly constituency in the Punjab Legislative Assembly. He is a member of the Aam Aadmi Party. He was elected as the MLA in the 2022 Punjab Legislative Assembly election.

== Member of Legislative Assembly ==
He represents the Guru Har Sahai Assembly constituency as MLA in Punjab Assembly. The Aam Aadmi Party gained a strong 79% majority in the sixteenth Punjab Legislative Assembly by winning 92 out of 117 seats in the 2022 Punjab Legislative Assembly election. MP Bhagwant Mann was sworn in as Chief Minister on 16 March 2022.

Committee assignments of Punjab Legislative Assembly

- Member (2022–23) Committee on Public Undertakings
- Member (2022–23) Committee on Privileges

== Cabinet Minister ==
5 MLAs including Fauja Singh Sarari were inducted into the cabinet and their swearing in ceremony took place on 4 July 2022. On 5 July, Bhagwant Mann announced the expansion of his cabinet of ministers with five new ministers to the departments of Punjab state government. Fauja Singh Sarari was among the inducted ministers and was given the charge of following departments.

- Freedom Fighters
- Defence Services Welfare
- Food Processing
- Horticulture

== Allegations ==
On 11 September 2022 opposition politician Sukhpal Singh Khaira levelled allegations of corruption against Minister Fauja Singh while sharing an audio call recording clip on Twitter.

== Electoral performance ==
Punjab Assembly election, 2022: Guru Har Sahai
Party	Candidate	Votes	%	±%
AAP	Fauja Singh Sarari	68,343	49.02	▲38.56
SAD	Vardev Singh	57,769	41.44	▼0.29
INC	Vijay Kumar	5,578	4	▼41.97
BJP	Gurpervez Singh	3,988	2.86	New
SAD(A)	Jatinder Singh Thind	1,208	0.87	
NOTA	None of the above	443	0.32	▼0.21
Majority		10,574	7.58	
Turnout		138,491		
Registered electors		172,641		

Political offices
Preceded by Bhagwant Mann	Punjab Cabinet minister for Freedom Fighters; 2022–present	Incumbent
Preceded by Bhagwant Mann	Punjab Cabinet minister for Defence Services Welfare; 2022–present	Incumbent
Preceded by Bhagwant Mann	Punjab Cabinet minister for Food Processing; 2022–present	Incumbent
Preceded by Bhagwant Mann	Punjab Cabinet minister for Horticulture; 2022–present	Incumbent
State Legislative Assembly
Preceded by -	Member of the Punjab Legislative Assembly from Guru Har Sahai Assembly constituency 2022 –	Incumbent
