= Khuddian =

Khuddian is a surname. People with the surname include:

- Gurmeet Singh Khuddian
- Jagdev Singh Khuddian
