= Vijay Singla =

Indian politician

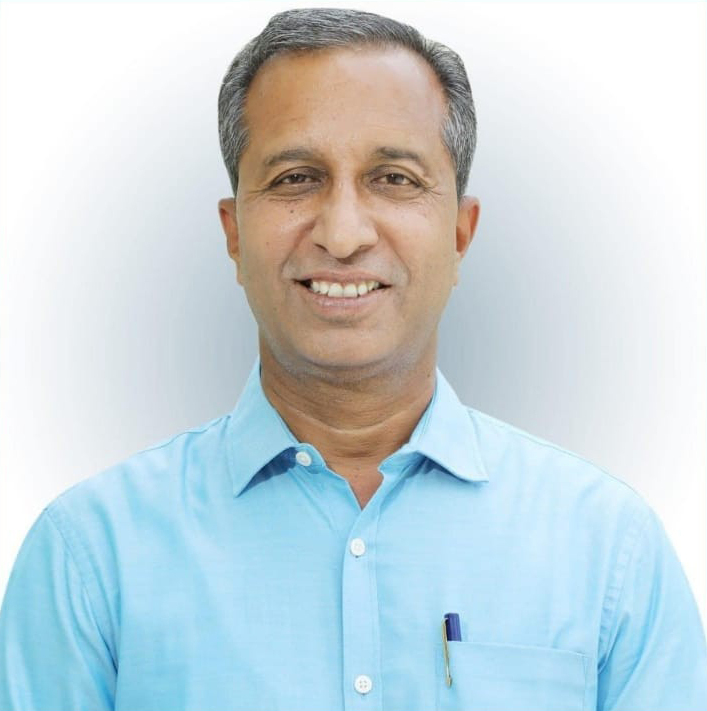
- Vijay Singla in 2022

Member of the Punjab Legislative Assembly
- Incumbent
- Assumed office 16 March 2022
- Preceded by: Nazar Singh Manshahia
- Constituency: Mansa

Cabinet Minister, Government of Punjab
- In office 19 March 2022 – 24 May 2022
- Chief Minister: Bhagwant Mann
- Department: Health and Family Welfare; Medical Education and Research
- Preceded by: Om Parkash Soni, Raj Kumar Verka
- Succeeded by: Bhagwant Mann

Personal details
- Party: Aam Aadmi Party

Vijay Singla is an Indian politician and the MLA representing the Mansa Assembly constituency in the Punjab Legislative Assembly. He was the Minister of Health and Family welfare and Medical education, Govt of Punjab between March–May 2022. He is a member of the Aam Aadmi Party.

He was one of three AAP government ministers arrested on corruption charges. He was elected as the MLA in the 2022 Punjab Legislative Assembly election.

== Career ==
=== Member of Legislative Assembly ===
Singla was elected as the MLA in the 2022 Punjab Legislative Assembly election. He represented the Mansa Assembly constituency in the Punjab Legislative Assembly. The Aam Aadmi Party gained a strong 79% majority in the sixteenth Punjab Legislative Assembly by winning 92 out of 117 seats in the 2022 Punjab Legislative Assembly election. MP Bhagwant Mann was sworn in as Chief Minister on 16 March 2022.

=== Cabinet minister ===
Singla took oath as a cabinet minister along with nine other MLAs on 19 March at Guru Nanak Dev auditorium of Punjab Raj Bhavan in Chandigarh. Eight ministers including Singla who took oath were greenhorn (first term) MLAs.

As a cabinet minister in the Mann ministry, Singla was given the charge of two departments of the Punjab Government:

1. Department of Health and Family Welfare
2. Department of Medical Education and Research

== Corruption charges ==
On May 24, 2022, Chief Minister Bhagwant Mann removed Singla from the cabinet ministry after charges of corruption against him came up to the notice of CM. Punjab Police was ordered by the CM to investigate the case. He was arrested by the Punjab Police. An employee of the Punjab Health System Corporation had complained against Singla and his assistant. Mohali court has sent Singla on 14 day judicial custody till the next hearing on 10 June.

On May 24, 2022, Chief Minister Bhagwant Mann went live on social media to announce Singla's arrest. He claimed he had personally handed over Singla to the Vigilance Bureau after receiving proof. Singla allegedly demanded a 2% commission on contracts/tenders from the Health Department and was linked to a ₹58 crore tender, amounting to a bribe of about ₹1.16 crore.

== Electoral performance ==
Punjab Assembly election, 2022: Mansa
Party	Candidate	Votes	%	±%
AAP	Vijay Singla	100,023	57.57	▲
INC	Shubhdeep Singh Sidhu Moosewala	36,700	21.12	▼
SAD	Prem Arora	27,180	15.64	
SAD(A)	Rajinder Singh	4,089	2.35	
PLC	Jiwan Dass Bawa	1,734	1.0	
NOTA	None of the above	1,099	0.63	
Majority		63,323	36.45	
Turnout		173,756	79.25	
Registered electors		219,264		
AAP hold				

Political offices
Preceded by Om Parkash Soni	Punjab Cabinet minister for Health and Family Welfare; March 2022–May 2022	Succeeded by Bhagwant Mann
Preceded by Raj Kumar Verka	Punjab Cabinet minister for Medical Education and Research; March 2022–May 2022	Succeeded by Bhagwant Mann
State Legislative Assembly
Preceded by Nazar Singh Manshahia (AAP)	Member of the Punjab Legislative Assembly from Mansa, Punjab Assembly constituency 2022 –	Incumbent
