= Baljit Kaur =

Indian politician

Dr. Baljit Kaur

Minister of Social Security, Women and Child Development and Social Justice, Empowerment and Minorities
- Incumbent
- Assumed office 19 March 2022
- Governor: Banwarilal Purohit; Gulab Chand Kataria
- Cabinet: Mann ministry
- Chief Minister: Bhagwant Mann

Member of Punjab Legislative Assembly
- Incumbent
- Assumed office 2022
- Preceded by: Ajaib Singh Bhatti
- Constituency: Malout
- Majority: Aam Aadmi Party

Personal details
- Party: Aam Aadmi Party
- Profession: Doctor (eye surgeon)

Dr. Baljit Kaur is an Indian politician and an eye surgeon. She was elected to the Malout Assembly constituency, Punjab in the 2022 Punjab Legislative Assembly election as a member of the Aam Aadmi Party.

== Career ==
She worked as an eye surgeon in the government run Muktsar civil hospital. She resigned from her job and joined AAP.

== Member of Legislative Assembly ==
Kaur was elected as the MLA in the 2022 Punjab Legislative Assembly election. She represented the Malout Assembly constituency in the Punjab Legislative Assembly. The Aam Aadmi Party gained a strong 79% majority in the sixteenth Punjab Legislative Assembly by winning 92 out of 117 seats in the 2022 Punjab Legislative Assembly election. MP Bhagwant Mann was sworn in as Chief Minister on 16 March 2022. She took oath as a cabinet minister along with nine other MLAs on 19 March at Guru Nanak Dev auditorium of Punjab Raj Bhavan in Chandigarh. Eight ministers including Kaur who took oath were greenhorn (first term) MLAs.

As a cabinet minister in the Mann ministry Kaur was given the charge of two departments of the Punjab Government:

1. Department of Social Justice, Empowerment & Minorities
2. Department of Social Security and Development of Women and Children

== Electoral performance ==
Punjab Assembly election, 2022: Malout
Party	Candidate	Votes	%	±%
AAP	Baljit Kaur	77,370	55.6	
SAD	Harpreet Singh	37,109	26.67	
INC	Prof. Rupinder Kaur Ruby	17,652	12.68	
PLC	Karanvir Singh	1,169	0.9	
NOTA	None of the above	897	0.5	
Majority		40,261	28.93	
Turnout		139,167		
Registered electors		176,919		
AAP gain from INC		Swing		

Political offices
Preceded by Raj Kumar Verka	Punjab Cabinet minister for Social Justice, Empowerment & Minorities; 2022–present	Incumbent
Preceded by Razia Sultana	Punjab Cabinet minister for Social Security and Development of Women and Children; 2022–present	Incumbent
State Legislative Assembly
Preceded by -	Member of the Punjab Legislative Assembly from Malout Assembly constituency 2022 –	Incumbent
