= Aman Arora =

Indian politician

Cabinet Minister, Government of Punjab
- Cabinet: Mann ministry
- Chief Minister: Bhagwant Mann
- Ministry and Departments: Information & Public Relations; New and Renewable Energy Sources; Housing and Urban Development; Printing & Stationery

Member of the Punjab Legislative Assembly
- Incumbent
- Assumed office March 2017
- Preceded by: Parminder Singh Dhindsa
- Constituency: Sunam

Convener of Aam Aadmi Party Punjab
- Incumbent
- Assumed office 22 November 2024
- Preceded by: Bhagwant Mann; Budh Ram Singh (acting)

Co-convener of Aam Aadmi Party Punjab
- In office 10 May 2017 – 17 March 2018
- Preceded by: Post established
- Succeeded by: Balbir Singh
- In office 31 January 2019 – 22 November 2024
- Preceded by: Balbir Singh
- Succeeded by: Amansher Singh

Personal details
- Born: 12 August 1974 (age 52) Sunam, Punjab, India
- Party: Aam Aadmi Party (2016-present)
- Other political affiliations: Indian National Congress (till 2016)
- Children: 2
- Education: Panjab University, Chandigarh

Aman Arora is an Indian politician. He is currently a Member of the Legislative Assembly for Sunam Assembly constituency and is the president of the Punjab state unit of the Aam Aadmi Party.

== Political career ==
Arora was elected from Sunam constituency for the first time as an MLA in the March 2017 Punjab Legislative Assembly election by a record 30,307 votes. He was re-elected as an MLA from Sunam and defeated his nearest opponent Jaswinder Singh Dhiman of Congress with a margin of 75,277 votes. He is the co-president of the Punjab state unit of AAP. The son of Bhagwan Das Arora, two-time MLA and Minister of Punjab, he joined politics at an early age and contested elections from Sunam twice, in 2007 and 2012, on the ticket of the Indian National Congress. In January 2016, after being influenced by Arvind Kejriwal’s politics of the common man, he joined the Aam Aadmi Party.

He became the co-convener of Aam Aadmi Party on 10 May 2017. He resigned from this post after apology by Arvind Kejriwal from Bikram Singh Majithia. In 2019 before 2019 Indian general election in Punjab he was appointed the chief of election campaign committee.

The Aam Aadmi Party gained a strong 79% majority in the sixteenth Punjab Legislative Assembly by winning 92 out of 117 seats in the 2022 Punjab Legislative Assembly election. MP Bhagwant Mann was sworn in as Chief Minister on 16 March 2022.

== Member of Legislative Assembly ==
He represents the Sunam Assembly constituency as MLA in Punjab Assembly.

Committee assignments of Punjab Legislative Assembly

- Chairman (2022–23) Committee on Public Accounts

== Cabinet Minister ==
5 MLAs including Aman Arora were inducted into the cabinet and their swearing in ceremony took place on 4 July 2022. On 5 July, Bhagwant Mann announced the expansion of his cabinet of ministers with five new ministers to the departments of Punjab state government. Aman Arora was among the inducted ministers and was given the charge of the following departments.

- Information & Public Relations
- New and Renewable Energy Sources
- Housing and Urban Development

== Electoral performance ==
2017 Punjab Legislative Assembly election: Sunam
Party	Candidate	Votes	%	±%
AAP	Aman Arora	72,815	47.38	
SAD	Gobind Singh Longowal	42,508	27.66	
INC	Daman Thind Bajwa	30,518	19.86	
NOTA	None of the Above	1,718	0.90	
Majority		30,307	19.7	
Turnout		153,688	83.9	
Registered electors		185,303		

Political offices
Preceded by Bhagwant Mann	Punjab Cabinet minister for Information & Public Relations; 2022–present	Incumbent
Preceded by Bhagwant Mann	Punjab Cabinet minister for New and Renewable Energy Sources; 2022–present	Incumbent
Preceded by Bhagwant Mann	Punjab Cabinet minister for Housing and Urban Development; 2022–present	Incumbent
State Legislative Assembly
Preceded by Parminder Singh Dhindsa	Member of the Punjab Legislative Assembly from Sunam Assembly constituency 2017 –	Incumbent
Aam Aadmi Party political offices
Preceded by -	Co-convener of Punjab unit of Aam Aadmi Party – present	Incumbent
