= Harbhajan Singh ETO =

Indian politician

Cabinet Minister for Power and Energy, Government of Punjab
- Incumbent
- Assumed office 19 March 2022
- Governor: Banwarilal Purohit; Gulab Chand Kataria
- Cabinet: Mann ministry
- Chief Minister: Bhagwant Mann

Member of the Punjab Legislative Assembly
- Incumbent
- Assumed office 16 March 2022
- Preceded by: Sukhwinder Singh Danny
- Constituency: Jandiala

Personal details
- Born: Punjab, India
- Party: Aam Aadmi Party

Harbhajan Singh ETO is an Indian politician and the MLA from Jandiala Assembly constituency. He is a member of the Aam Aadmi Party. He became an Excise and Taxation Officer (ETO) in 2012 but he took voluntary retirement from the post of ETO in 2017 and he contested election from Jandiala constituency in 2017. He secured 33912 votes in 2017 and was among the highest vote gatherers in Majha region of Punjab in 2017. In 2022 he won from the same constituency with a margin of almost 25,000+ votes defeating working president and sitting MLA Sukhwinder Singh Danny Bandala.

== Member of Legislative Assembly ==
Singh was elected as the MLA in the 2022 Punjab Legislative Assembly election. He represented the Jandiala Assembly constituency in the Punjab Legislative Assembly. The Aam Aadmi Party gained a strong 79% majority in the sixteenth Punjab Legislative Assembly by winning 92 out of 117 seats in the 2022 Punjab Legislative Assembly election. MP Bhagwant Mann was sworn in as Chief Minister on 16 March 2022. He took oath as a cabinet minister along with nine other MLAs on 19 March at Guru Nanak Dev auditorium of Punjab Raj Bhavan in Chandigarh. Eight ministers including Singh who took oath were greenhorn (first term) MLAs.

As a cabinet minister in the Mann ministry, Singh was given the charge of two departments of the Punjab Government:

1. Department of Power
2. Department of Public Works

=== Power minister ===
Fulfilling their election promise of providing free electricity, from 1 July the people in Punjab would get 300 units of free electricity. 73.39 lakh domestic consumers were estimated to benefit from the scheme.

== Assets and liabilities declared during elections ==
During the 2022 Punjab Legislative Assembly election, He declared Rs. 1,16,39,694 as an overall financial asset and Rs. 29,00,390 as financial liability.

== Electoral performance ==
Punjab Assembly election, 2022: Jandiala
Party	Candidate	Votes	%	±%
AAP	Harbhajan Singh E.T.O.	59,724	46.41	▲19.24
INC	Sukhwinder Singh Danny Bandala	34,341	26.69	▼15.81
SAD	Satinderjit Singh Chhajjalwaddi	26,302	20.44	▼7.3
SAD(A)	Bakhshish Singh Uppal	3,361	2.61	New
Independent	Gurnam Singh Daud	1,315	1.02	New
BSP (A)	Hardeep Singh	577	0.45	▼0.09
PLC	Gagandeep Singh A.R.	512	0.4	New
NOTA	None of the above	918	0.71	
Majority		25,383	19.72	
Turnout		1,28,681		
Registered electors				
AAP gain from INC				

Political offices
Preceded by Charanjit Singh Channi	Punjab Cabinet minister for Power; 2022–present	Incumbent
Preceded by Vijay Inder Singla	Punjab Cabinet minister for Public Works; 2022–present	Incumbent
State Legislative Assembly
Preceded by Sukhwinder Singh Danny Bandala (INC)	Member of the Punjab Legislative Assembly from Jandiala Assembly constituency 2022 –	Incumbent
