= Gurmeet Singh Meet Hayer =

Indian politician (born 1989)

Meet Hayer Member Parliament
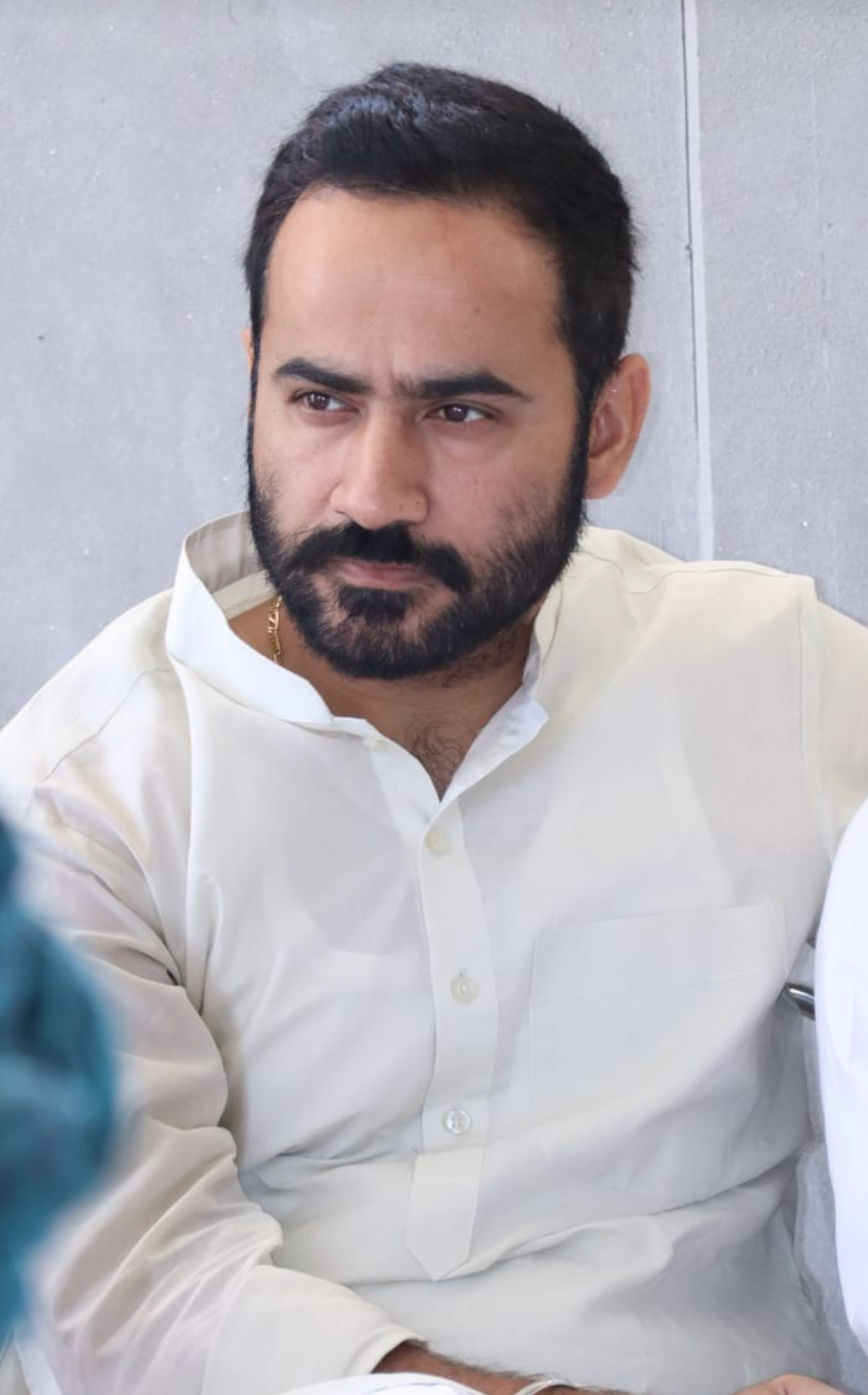

Member of Parliament, Lok Sabha
- Incumbent
- Assumed office 25 June 2024
- Preceded by: Simranjit Singh Mann
- Constituency: Sangrur

Cabinet Minister, Government of Punjab
- In office 19 March 2022 – 27 June 2024
- Governor: Banwarilal Purohit
- Cabinet: Mann ministry
- Chief Minister: Bhagwant Mann
- Ministry and Departments: School Education; Higher Education & Languages; Sports & Youth Services; Printing & Stationary; Governance Reforms; Water Resources; Mines & Geology; Conservation of Soil & Water; Science, Technology & Environment

Member of the Punjab Legislative Assembly
- In office 11 March 2022 – 18 June 2024
- Succeeded by: Kala Dhillon
- Constituency: Barnala
- In office 11 March 2017 – 10 March 2022
- Preceded by: Kewal Singh Dhillon
- Constituency: Barnala

Floor leader of AAP in Lok Sabha
- Incumbent
- Assumed office 25 June 2024

Youth President of AAP Punjab
- In office 25 October 2020 – 28 January 2024
- Succeeded by: Manjinder Singh Lalpura

Personal details
- Born: Gurmeet Singh Hayer; 21 April 1989 (age 37) Barnala, Punjab, India
- Party: Aam Aadmi Party(2017 - Present)
- Education: Mechanical Engineer
- Occupation: Politician

Gurmeet Singh Meet Hayer is an Indian politician and a prominent member of Aam Aadmi Party (AAP). Currently serving as the Member of Parliament, Lok Sabha for Sangrur constituency and is also the Floor leader of Aam Aadmi Party in Lok Sabha.

Previously he represented Barnala constituency as a Member of the Punjab Legislative Assembly for two consecutive terms. Hayer first won the assembly elections in 2017, defeating Indian National Congress candidate Kewal Singh Dhillon, and repeated his success in 2022 with a commanding margin, securing nearly 50% of the votes.

During his tenure in the Mann ministry, he held several key portfolios. Additionally, he has served as the in-charge of AAP's Youth Wing in Punjab.

== Member of the Legislative Assembly ==
=== First Term ===
Hayer was first elected as an MLA in the 2017 Punjab Legislative Assembly election. He represented the Barnala Assembly constituency in the Punjab Legislative Assembly.

Committee assignments of Punjab Legislative Assembly

- Chairman (2021–22) Public Accounts Committee.

He has also been a member in the following Committees:-

1. Public Undertakings Committee
2. House Committee and Petitions Committee of Punjab Vidhan Sabha.
3. Member of Government Assurances Committee of Punjab Vidhan Sabha for the year 2019-20.

=== Second Term ===
Hayer was re-elected as the MLA from Barnala Assembly constituency in the 2022 Punjab Legislative Assembly election with getting almost 50% of the votes polled giving him a comprehensive win over his nearest rival. The Aam Aadmi Party gained a strong 79% majority in the sixteenth Punjab Legislative Assembly by winning 92 out of 117 seats in the 2022 Punjab Legislative Assembly election. MP Bhagwant Mann was sworn in as Chief Minister on 16 March 2022. Hayer took oath as a Cabinet Minister along with nine other MLAs on 19 March at Guru Nanak Dev auditorium of Punjab Raj Bhavan in Chandigarh.

As a cabinet minister in the Mann ministry, Hayer was initially given the charge of three departments of the Punjab Government:

1. Department of School Education (March - July 2022)
2. Department of Sports and Youth Services
3. Department of Higher Education and Languages

On 5 July, Bhagwant Mann announced the expansion of his cabinet of ministers with five new ministers to the departments of Punjab state government. Hayer has now been given the charge of following departments.

1. Governance Reforms
2. Printing & Stationery
3. Science Technology & Environment
4. Sports and Youth Services
5. Higher Education and Languages

On 7 January 2023, during the cabinet reshuffle, his portfolios were changed and he has now been given the charge of following departments.

1. Governance Reforms
2. Water Resources
3. Mines & Geology
4. Science Technology & Environment
5. Sports and Youth Services

== Member of the Parliament ==
In 2024 Gurmeet Singh Meet Hayer is elected to Lok Sabha from Sangrur Lok Sabha by defeating Sukhpal Singh Khaira from Congress by a margin of 172560 votes.

Hayer has been chosen as a member in Parliamentary standing committee on IT (2024–25).

== Electoral Performance ==
Assembly election, 2017: Barnala
Party	Candidate	Votes	%	±%
AAP	Gurmeet Singh Meet Hayer	47,606	35.49	
INC	Kewal Singh Dhillon	45,174	33.67	
SAD	Surinder Pal Singh Sibia	31,111	23.19	
SAD(A)	Simranjit Singh Mann	5,061	3.77	
BSP	Paramjit Kaur	2,369	1.77	
NOTA	None of the above	889	0.66	
Registered electors		171,962		
AAP gain from INC				

Assembly election, 2022: Barnala
Party	Candidate	Votes	%	±%
AAP	Gurmeet Singh Meet Hayer	64,800	49.27	▲13.78
SAD	Kulwant Singh Keetu	27,178	20.66	▼2.53
INC	Manish Bansal	16,853	12.81	▼20.86
SAD(A)	Gurpreet Singh	9,917	7.54	▲3.77
BJP	Dhiraj Kumar	9,122	6.94	New
NOTA	None of the above	855	0.65	
Majority		37,622	28.61	
Turnout		131,532	71.81	
Registered electors		182,502		
AAP hold				

General Election 2024: Sangrur
Party	Candidate	Votes	%	±%
AAP	Gurmeet Singh Meet Hayer	364,085	36.06	▲1.27
INC	Sukhpal Singh Khaira	1,91,525	18.97	▲7.76
SAD(A)	Simranjit Singh Mann	1,87,246	18.55	▼17.06
BJP	Arvind Khanna	1,28,253	12.70	▲3.37
SAD	Iqbal Singh Jhundan	62,488	6.19	▼0.06
NOTA	None of the Above	3,820	0.38	▲0.03
Majority		1,72,560	▲17.09	▲16.21
Turnout		10,09,665		
Registered electors		15,56,601		
AAP gain from SAD(A)		Swing	▲1.27	

Political offices
Preceded by Pargat Singh	Punjab Cabinet minister for School Education; March 2022 –June 2024	Succeeded by Harjot Singh Bains
Preceded by Pargat Singh	Punjab Cabinet minister for Sports and Youth Services; 2022–present	Incumbent
Preceded by Pargat Singh	Punjab Cabinet minister for Higher Education and Languages; 2022–present	Incumbent
Preceded by Bhagwant Mann	Punjab Cabinet minister for Governance Reforms; 2022–present	Incumbent
Preceded by Bhagwant Mann	Punjab Cabinet minister for Printing & Stationery; 2022–present	Incumbent
Preceded by Bhagwant Mann	Punjab Cabinet minister for Science Technology & Environment; 2022–present	Incumbent
State Legislative Assembly
Preceded by Kewal Singh Dhillon	Member of the Punjab Legislative Assembly from Barnala Assembly constituency 2017 –	Incumbent
