= Guru Har Sahai Assembly constituency =

Legislative Assembly constituency in Punjab State, India

Coordinates: 30.71°N 74.4°E

Guru Har Sahai
- Constituency No. 78 for the Punjab Legislative Assembly

Constituency details
- Country: India
- State: Punjab
- District: Firozpur
- Lok Sabha constituency: Firozpur
- Total electors: 172,641 (in 2022)
- Reservation: None

Member of Legislative Assembly
- 16th Punjab Legislative Assembly
- Incumbent Fauja Singh Sarari
- Party: Aam Aadmi Party
- Elected year: 2022

Guru Har Sahai Assembly constituency (Sl. No.: 78) is a Punjab Legislative Assembly constituency in Firozepur district, Punjab state, India.

== Members of the Legislative Assembly ==
Most successful parties from Guru Har Sahai Vidhan Sabha
1. INC (9 Times) (56.2%)
2. IND (4 Times) (25.0%)
3. AAP (1 Time) (6.25%)
4. BJP (1 Time) (6.25%)
5. SAD (1 Time) (6.25%)

Election	Name	Party
1952	Partap Singh	Independent
1957	Bakhtawar Singh	Indian National Congress
1962	Jaswant Singh	Independent
1967	Bakhtawar Singh	Independent
1969	Lachhman Singh	Indian National Congress
1972	Lachhman Singh	Indian National Congress
1977	Lachhman Singh	Indian National Congress
1980	Khushal Chand	Bharatiya Janata Party
1985	Sajwar Singh	Independent
1992	Sajwar Singh	Indian National Congress
1997	Paramjit Singh	Shiromani Akali Dal
2002	Rana Gurmit Singh Sodhi	Indian National Congress
2007	Rana Gurmit Singh Sodhi	Indian National Congress
2012	Rana Gurmit Singh Sodhi	Indian National Congress
2017	Rana Gurmit Singh Sodhi	Indian National Congress
2022	Fauja Singh Sarari	Aam Aadmi Party

== Election results ==
=== 2027 ===
Punjab Assembly election, 2027: Guru Har Sahai
Party	Candidate	Votes	%	±%
AAP				
AD (WPD)				New entry
INC				
BSP				
SAD				
BJP				
NOTA	None of the above			
Majority				
Turnout				

=== 2022 ===
Punjab Assembly election, 2022: Guru Har Sahai
Party	Candidate	Votes	%	±%
AAP	Fauja Singh Sarari	68,343	49.02	▲38.56
SAD	Vardev Singh	57,769	41.44	▼0.29
INC	Vijay Kumar	5,578	4.0	▼41.97
BJP	Gurpervez Singh	3,988	2.86	New
SAD(A)	Jatinder Singh Thind	1,208	0.87	
NOTA	None of the above	443	0.32	▼0.21
Majority		10,574	7.58	
Turnout		138,491		
Registered electors		172,641		

=== 2017 ===
Punjab Assembly election, 2017: Guru Har Sahai
Party	Candidate	Votes	%	±%
INC	Rana Gurmit Singh Sodhi	62,787	45.7	
SAD	Vardev Singh	56,991	41.5	
AAP	Malkit Chand	14,282	10.4	
NOTA	None of the above	724	0.5	
Majority		5,796	4.2	
Turnout		136,574	87.1	
Registered electors		157,685		
