= Laljit Singh Bhullar =

Indian politician

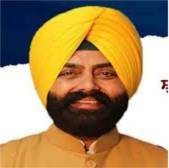

Ex Cabinet Minister for Transport, Punjab
- In office 19 March 2022 – 21 March 2026
- Governor: Banwarilal Purohit; Gulab Chand Kataria
- Chief Minister: Bhagwant Mann

Cabinet Minister for Hospitality, Punjab
- In office 19 March 2022 – 21 March 2026
- Governor: Banwarilal Purohit; Gulab Chand Kataria
- Chief Minister: Bhagwant Mann

Member of Punjab Legislative Assembly
- Incumbent
- Assumed office 10 March 2022
- Preceded by: Harminder Singh Gill
- Constituency: Patti

Laljit Singh Bhullar is an Indian politician and the Member of Punjab Legislative Assembly representing Patti. He is a member of the Aam Aadmi Party.

== Career ==
Bhullar worked as volunteer in Aam Aadmi party. He defeated four-time SAD MLA Adesh Partap Singh Kairon and one-time Congress MLA Harminder Singh Gill in the 2022 election. The Aam Aadmi Party gained a strong 79% majority in the sixteenth Punjab Legislative Assembly by winning 92 out of 117 seats in the 2022 Punjab Legislative Assembly election. MP Bhagwant Mann was sworn in as Chief Minister on 16 March 2022.

== Assets and liabilities declared during elections ==
During the 2022 Punjab Legislative Assembly election, he declared Rs. 6,52,90,500 as an overall financial asset and Rs. 63,78,000 as financial liability.

== Member of Legislative Assembly ==
Bhullar was elected as the MLA in the 2022 Punjab Legislative Assembly election. He represented the Patti, Punjab Assembly constituency in the Punjab Legislative Assembly. He took oath as a cabinet minister along with nine other MLAs on 19 March at Guru Nanak Dev auditorium of Punjab Raj Bhavan in Chandigarh. Eight ministers including Bhullar who took oath were greenhorn (first term) MLAs.

As a cabinet minister in the Mann ministry, Bhullar was given the charge of two departments of the Punjab Government:

1. Department of Transport
2. Department of Hospitality

== Controversy over casteist remark ==
During an election rally in Patti (Tarn Taran district) in April 2024, while campaigning for the Khadoor Sahib Lok Sabha seat, Laljit Singh Bhullar reportedly made derogatory remarks targeting the Ramgarhia and Suniyar communities, using a term, Ghuli gharh, perceived as deeply offensive. He also took a swipe at former Congress MLA Harminder Singh Gill, making caste-related insinuations.

Despite the apology, Ramgarhia community organizations remained unsatisfied. The All Vishwakarma Ramgarhia/Dhiman Foundation demanded Bhullar's removal from the cabinet and called for a boycott of AAP candidates across Punjab.

== Transport minister ==
In June 2022, CM Bhagwant Mann announced Volvo bus service between IGI Airport and different Punjab cities of the state. The tariff charged by the PRTC and PEPSU buses for the Airport was announced at half the rates being charged by the private bus operators. Mann said that this service would break the monopoly of a few families in bus business with political links.

== Electoral performance ==
Punjab Assembly election, 2022: Patti
| Party | Candidate | Votes | % | ±% |
|---|---|---|---|---|
| AAP | Laljit Singh Bhullar | 57,323 | 39.55 | |
| SAD | Adesh Partap Singh Kairon | 46,324 | 31.96 | |
| INC | Harminder Singh Gill | 33,009 | 22.78 | |
| NOTA | None of the above | 1,079 | 7.6 | |
| Majority | | 10,999 | 7.59 | |
| Turnout | | 144,922 | 70.9 | |
| Registered electors | | 204,395 | | |
| AAP gain from INC | | | | |

Political offices
| Preceded by Amrinder Singh Raja Warring | Punjab Cabinet minister for Transport; 2022–present | Incumbent |
| Preceded by Kuldeep Singh Dhaliwal | Punjab Cabinet minister for Animal Husbandry, Fisheries & Dairy Development; 2022–present | Incumbent |
| Preceded by Charanjit Singh Channi | Punjab Cabinet minister for Hospitality/ March–May 2022 | Succeeded by Bhagwant Mann |
State Legislative Assembly
| Preceded by - | Member of the Punjab Legislative Assembly from Patti, Punjab Assembly constituency 2022 – | Incumbent |
