= Harjot Singh Bains =

Indian politician (b. 1990)

Cabinet Minister, Government of Punjab
- Incumbent
- Assumed office 21 March 2022
- Governor: Banwarilal Purohit; Gulab Chand Kataria
- Cabinet: Mann ministry
- Chief Minister: Bhagwant Mann
- Ministry and Departments: Technical Education & Industrial Training; Higher Education and Languages; School Education

Cabinet Minister for School Education, Government of Punjab
- Incumbent
- Assumed office 4 July 2022
- Preceded by: Gurmeet Singh Meet Hayer

Cabinet Minister for Tourism & Cultural Affairs, Government of Punjab
- In office 21 March 2022 – 4 July 2022
- Preceded by: Charanjit Singh Channi
- Succeeded by: Anmol Gagan Maan

Member of the Punjab Legislative Assembly
- Incumbent
- Assumed office 16 March 2022
- Preceded by: Rana Kanwar Pal
- Constituency: Anandpur Sahib

Personal details
- Born: 15 November 1990 (age 35)
- Party: Aam Aadmi Party
- Spouse(s): Jyoti Yadav, IPS
- Education: Schooling from Sacred Heart Sr. Sec. School, BRS Nagar Ludhiana and Kundan Vidya Mandir, Ludhiana (Hons) Panjab University. Attended The London School Of Economics & Political Science for a course in International Human Rights.
- Alma mater: Panjab University,
- Occupation: politician
- Profession: Advocate practicing at Punjab and Haryana High Court

Harjot Singh Bains is an Indian politician of AAP from Punjab.

He won from Anandpur Sahib Assembly constituency in 2022 Punjab Legislative Assembly election. He is currently Cabinet Minister in Punjab Government. On 19 March 2022 he took oath as the youngest ever cabinet minister in the history of Punjab state by breaking the record of Bikram Singh Majithia

== Biography ==
Bains hails from Village Gambhirpur in Shri Anandpur Sahib tehsil, district Ropar of Punjab. His grandfather Late S. Ujjagar Singh Bains was an employee in BBMB Nangal and worked in the construction of Bhakra Nangal Dam and his maternal grandfather Late S. Kabal Singh Dhillon was one of the leading contractors of his time in Nangal.

He did his schooling from Ludhiana and BA LLB Hons. from Punjab University. He has also been to London School of Economics and Political Science for a short course in International Human Rights Law. He is a practicing lawyer in Punjab and Haryana High Court.

He has been part of many social movements and founded a Pan Punjab United Youth Organization at the age of 18. He actively participated in the India Against Corruption movement. He was the founding president of the Aam Aadmi Party in Punjab at the age of 23. In 2016, he led the 300-kilometre-long (190 mi), 15-day "Nawa Punjab March" against drug abuse in Punjab, walking from Shri in Fatehgarh Sahib district to the border of Hussainiwala in Ferozepur district.

== Political career ==
=== 2017 Punjab assembly election ===
In the 2017 Punjab Legislative Assembly election, he was the Aam Aadmi Party candidate to represent the Sahnewal Assembly constituency. He ran as a candidate from Sahnewal in the 2017 assembly elections but was unsuccessful, securing 39,000 votes at the age of 26. He is spokesperson for the Aam Aadmi Party and member of the National Executive of the Aam Aadmi party.

=== 2022 Punjab assembly election ===
Mr. Bains won 2022 Punjab assembly elections from Shri Anandpur Sahib constituency by defeating Mr. Rana KP Singh of Congress Party by more than 45,000 votes. The Aam Aadmi Party gained a strong 79% majority in the sixteenth Punjab Legislative Assembly by winning 92 out of 117 seats in the 2022 Punjab Legislative Assembly election. MP Bhagwant Mann was sworn in as Chief Minister on 16 March 2022.

On 14 October 2022, Bains was appointed the AAP Himachal Pradesh in charge, for the 2022 Himachal Pradesh Legislative Assembly election.

== Member of Legislative Assembly ==
Bains was elected as the MLA in the 2022 Punjab Legislative Assembly election. He represented the Anandpur Sahib Assembly constituency in the Punjab Legislative Assembly.

== Cabinet minister ==
Bains took oath as a cabinet minister along with nine other MLAs on 19 March at Guru Nanak Dev auditorium of Punjab Raj Bhavan in Chandigarh. Eight ministers including Bains who took oath were greenhorn (first term) MLAs.

As a cabinet minister in the Mann ministry, Bains was given the charge of four departments of the Punjab Government:

1. Department of Legal & Legislative Affairs
2. Department of Mines & Geology
3. Department of Jails
4. Department of Tourism & Cultural Affairs

=== Jails minister ===
In May 2022, Bains announced that the jail superintendents would be held accountable for illegal use of mobile phones inside the jail premises by the inmates. In June 2022, he announced that more than 1000 mobile phones were confiscated since the AAP government came to power in Punjab in February. He announced that the modernization of prisons was ongoing and the recruitment process of 1000 jail wardens was happening to meet the staff shortage in the prison department. He stated that the prison officials in Punjab were committed to transforming jails into real 'sudhar ghars' (correctional facilities). He said that jails no longer provided luxurious facilities as they did in past.

=== Mines minister ===
As Minister for mines, Bains introduced stricter regulations for mining. The regulations were designed to impact the sand mafia in Punjab.

== Electoral performance ==
Punjab Assembly election, 2017: Sahnewal
Party	Candidate	Votes	%	±%
SAD	Sharanjit Singh Dhillon	63,184	38.07	▼15.37
INC	Satwinder Bitti	58,633	35.33	▼2.27
AAP	Harjot Singh Bains	39,570	23.84	New entry
BSP	Surinder Kumar	1,588	0.95	▼2.67
SAD(A)	Manbir Singh Grewal	624	0.37	▲0.10
Majority		4,551	2.74	
Turnout		165,972	75.50	
Registered electors		219,853		
SAD hold		Swing		

Punjab Assembly election, 2022: Anandpur Sahib
Party	Candidate	Votes	%	±%
AAP	Harjot Singh Bains	82,132	57.92	
INC	Kanwar Pal Singh	36,352	25.63	
BJP	Parminder Sharma	11,433	8.06	
BSP	Nutan Kumar	5,923	4.18	
SAD(A)	Ranjit Singh	1,459	1.03	
NOTA	None of the above	1290	0.91	
Majority		45,780	32.29	
Turnout		141809		
Registered electors		193,750		
AAP gain from INC				

Political offices
Preceded by Charanjit Singh Channi	Punjab Cabinet minister for Legal & Legislative Affairs; 2022–present	Succeeded by Bhagwant Mann
Preceded by Charanjit Singh Channi	Punjab Cabinet minister for Mines & Geology; 2022–present	Incumbent
Preceded by Sukhjinder Singh Randhawa	Punjab Cabinet minister for Jails; 2022–present	Incumbent
Preceded by Charanjit Singh Channi	Punjab Cabinet minister for Tourism & Cultural Affairs; March – May 2022	Succeeded by Anmol Gagan Maan
Preceded by Brahm Shankar Jimpa	Punjab Cabinet minister for Water Resources; 2022–present	Incumbent
Preceded by Gurmeet Singh Meet Hayer	Punjab Cabinet minister for School Education; 2022–present	Incumbent
State Legislative Assembly
Preceded by -	Member of the Punjab Legislative Assembly from Anandpur Sahib Assembly constituency 2022 –	Incumbent
