= Chetan Singh Jauramajra =

Indian politician

Cabinet Minister, Government of Punjab
- In office 8 Jan 2023 – 23 Sept 2024
- Cabinet: Mann ministry
- Chief Minister: Bhagwant Mann
- Ministry and Departments: Freedom Fighters; Defence Services Welfare; Food Processing; Horticulture

Member of the Punjab Legislative Assembly
- Incumbent
- Assumed office 10 March 2022
- Preceded by: Rajinder Singh
- Constituency: Samana

President of Patiala (rural), AAP Punjab
- Incumbent
- Assumed office 2017
- Constituency: Samana

Personal details
- Born: 1967 (age 58–59)
- Party: Bharatiya Janata Party (2026-present); Aam Aadmi Party (till–2026)
- Parent: Gurdev Singh (father)

Chetan Singh Jouramajra is an Indian politician, and was a member of the Aam Aadmi Party until 2026. He is Member of Legislative Assembly from Samana, was elected in 2022 Punjab assembly elections, and also serves as a president of Patiala district rural unit of the party. In 2019, he was shot saving a girl from kidnapping. In 2022, he won in Samana by margin of 39,713.

== Early life ==
Chetan Singh was born in 1967 to father Gurdev Singh.

== Political career ==
Chetan Singh was appointed the president of Patiala district rural unit of Aam Aadmi Party.

In March 2019, Chetan Singh was shot by unidentified assailants while he tried to prevent kidnapping a girl in Tarn Taran Sahib. He was shot near neck, and was admitted to a hospital in Amritsar. Arvind Kejriwal, Chief Minister of Delhi questioned the law & order situation of Punjab, following the incident. On 15 March 2019, AAP delegation met Punjab CEO, Karuna Raju regarding the incident. In October 2020, his images from the incident were linked to another incident and went viral in Shahjahanpur, Uttar Pradesh.

On 10 December 2021, he was announced as the candidate for Member of the Punjab Legislative Assembly from Samana Assembly constituency in the 2022 Punjab Legislative Assembly elections. He filed the nomination from the constituency on 28 January 2022. He secured 74,375 votes, and defeated cabinet ministers Surjit Singh Rakhra of SAD with margin of 39,713 votes, and Rajinder Singh of INC. The Aam Aadmi Party gained a strong 79% majority in the sixteenth Punjab Legislative Assembly by winning 92 out of 117 seats in the 2022 Punjab Legislative Assembly election. MP Bhagwant Mann was sworn in as Chief Minister on 16 March 2022.

He has been appointed Cabinet Minister in Government of Punjab, India on 4 July 2022.

After not getting the ticket from AAP, Chetan, alongside Kunwar Vijay Pratap Singh and Harmeet Singh Pathanmajra, left the party and joined the Bhartiya Janta Party on 2 November 2026.

== Controversy ==
=== Humiliating Hospital Official Incident (July 2022) ===
During an inspection at Guru Gobind Singh Medical College & Hospital in Faridkot, Jauramajra allegedly forced Vice Chancellor Dr. Raj Bahadur to lie down on a worn-out mattress meant for patients, as a pointed demonstration of poor hospital conditions. A video of the incident circulated widely. The following day, Dr. Bahadur resigned, stating he felt humiliated. The incident sparked widespread criticism from medical professionals and political opponents.

The backlash prompted the Punjab CM to meet with Jauramajra to discuss the issue. Some of his cabinet colleagues, including Fauja Singh Sarari, issued apologies on his behalf.

=== Inappropriate Conduct Towards School Teachers (April 2025) ===
At a government school event in Samana under the Punjab Sikhya Kranti initiative, Jauramajra publicly admonished the principal and teachers from the stage, his remarks were deemed disrespectful and dismissive. The Democratic Teachers’ Front and other educators marched in protest, calling for an apology and denouncing political interference in schools.

In response to mounting pressure and planned statewide teacher protests, including effigy burnings, Jauramajra issued a public apology, stating he meant no personal disrespect to teachers and acknowledging their importance.

== Member of Legislative Assembly ==
Committee assignments of Punjab Legislative Assembly

- Member (2022–23) House Committee
- Member (2022–23) Committee on Agriculture and its allied activities

== Cabinet Minister ==
5 MLAs including Chetan Singh Jauramajra were inducted into the cabinet and their swearing in ceremony took place on 4 July 2022. On 5 July, Bhagwant Mann announced the expansion of his cabinet of ministers with five new ministers to the departments of Punjab state government. Chetan Singh Jauramajra was among the inducted ministers and was given the charge of following departments.

- Health and Family Welfare
- Medical Education and Research
- Elections

On 7 January 2023, during the cabinet reshuffle, he was given the charge of new following portfolios.

- Freedom Fighters
- Defence Services Welfare
- Food Processing
- Horticulture

== Electoral performance ==
Punjab Assembly election, 2022: Samana
Party	Candidate	Votes	%	±%
AAP	Chetan Singh Jormajra	74,375	50.14	
SAD	Surjit Singh Rakhra	34,662	23.37	
INC	Rajinder Singh	23,576	15.89	
PLC	Surinder Singh Kherki	5,084	3.43	New
SAD(A)	Hardeep Singh	3,833	2.58	▲1.33
NOTA	None of the above	1,107	0.75	
Majority		39,713	26.77	
Turnout		148,335	76.8	
Registered electors		193,141		
AAP gain from INC				

Political offices
Preceded by Bhagwant Mann	Punjab Cabinet minister for Health and Family Welfare; 2022–present	Incumbent
Preceded by Bhagwant Mann	Punjab Cabinet minister for Medical Education and Research; 2022–present	Incumbent
Preceded by Bhagwant Mann	Punjab Cabinet minister for Elections; 2022–present	Incumbent
State Legislative Assembly
Preceded by Rajinder Singh (INC)	Member of the Punjab Legislative Assembly from Samana Assembly constituency 2022 –	Incumbent
