= Brahm Shankar Jimpa =

Indian politician

Punjab Cabinet minister for Revenue, Rehabilitation and Disaster Management
- In office 2022–2024
- Cabinet: Mann ministry
- Preceded by: Aruna Chaudhary

Punjab Cabinet minister for Water Resources
- Incumbent
- Assumed office 2022
- Preceded by: Sukhbinder Singh Sarkaria

Punjab Cabinet minister for Water Supply & Sanitation
- Incumbent
- Assumed office 2022
- Preceded by: Razia Sultana

MLA Punjab Legislative Assembly
- Incumbent
- Assumed office 2022
- Preceded by: Sunder Sham Arora (INC)
- Constituency: Hoshiarpur
- Majority: Aam Aadmi Party

Personal details
- Party: Aam Aadmi Party

Pandit Brahm Shankar Sharma Jimpa (or Bram Shanker Jimpa) is an Indian politician and the minister for Revenue and Water Resources in the Mann ministry, Punjab government. He is the MLA representing the Hoshiarpur Assembly constituency in the Punjab Legislative Assembly. He is a member of the Aam Aadmi Party. He was elected as the MLA in the 2022 Punjab Legislative Assembly election.

== Career ==
He has been four time councilor from Hoshiarpur. On 24 June 2020, Jimpa was appointed by Chief Minister Amarinder Singh as the Vice Chairman of Punjab State Industrial Development Corporation (PSIDC). He is a member of the Aam Aadmi Party.

== Member of Legislative Assembly ==
He was elected as the MLA in the 2022 Punjab Legislative Assembly election. He represented the Hoshiarpur Assembly constituency in the Punjab Legislative Assembly. Jimpa took oath as a cabinet minister along with nine other MLAs on 19 March at Guru Nanak Dev auditorium of Punjab Raj Bhavan in Chandigarh. Eight ministers including Jimpa who took oath were greenhorn (first term) MLAs. The Aam Aadmi Party gained a strong 79% majority in the sixteenth Punjab Legislative Assembly by winning 92 out of 117 seats in the 2022 Punjab Legislative Assembly election. MP Bhagwant Mann was sworn in as Chief Minister on 16 March 2022.

As a cabinet minister in the Mann ministry Jimpa was given the charge of three departments of the Punjab Government:

1. Department of Revenue, Rehabilitation and Disaster Management
2. Department of Water Resources
3. Department of Water Supply & Sanitation

== Revenue Minister ==
Jimpa took charge as the Revenue minister in the Punjab government in March 2022. He announced that his priority was to bring transparency in the department. He passed an order to live-stream the working of the officials in the revenue department. The order also made it mandatory to submit a daily report of working in the department with a follow-up check from the people inquiring if any bribe was taken. The revenue officers objected to the order and threatened protest after which the order was withdrawn.

On 5 December 2019, the Council of Ministers in the Amarinder Singh government took a decision to reduce the number of posts of patwari in the revenue department from 4,716 to 3,660. The decision was not publicly disclosed then. In August 2022, only 1,700 patwaris were working in Punjab and more than 3000 seats were vacant. After the new Mann government formation, Jimpa ordered the filling of vacancies of 3,660 authorized posts of patwaris.

== Water Resources Minister ==
Jimpa took charge as the minister in the Water Resources Department of the Punjab government in March 2022. At the time of taking charge, he expressed concern at the fall in the watertable in the state. He expressed intentions of launching a 'jan andolan' (social movement) for water conservation in agriculture, domestic and commercial sectors. He also expressed intentions for promotion of rainwater harvesting.

== Electoral performance ==
Political offices
Preceded by Aruna Chaudhary	Punjab Cabinet minister for Revenue, Rehabilitation and Disaster Management; 2022–present	Incumbent
Preceded by Razia Sultana	Punjab Cabinet minister for Water Supply & Sanitation; 2022–present	Incumbent
Preceded by Sukhbinder Singh Sarkaria	Punjab Cabinet minister for Water Resources; Mar – July 2022	Succeeded by Harjot Singh Bains
State Legislative Assembly
Preceded by Sunder Sham Arora (INC)	Member of the Punjab Legislative Assembly from Hoshiarpur Assembly constituency 2022 –	Incumbent
