= Lok Bhavan, Haryana =

Residence of the Governor of Haryana

Lok Bhavan

General information
- Coordinates: 30.742262°N 76.809882°E
- Owner: Government of Haryana

References
- Website

Lok Bhavan formerly Raj Bhavan, Haryana is the Raj Bhavan ("Government House") or official residence of the Governor of Haryana, India. It is located in Chandigarh, the shared capital of the states of Haryana and Punjab, on the shore of Sukhna Lake, just north of Punjab Raj Bhavan, residence of the governor of Punjab. It current tenant is Ashim Kumar Ghosh

== See also ==
- Government Houses of the British Indian Empire
