= Gurmeet Singh Khuddian =

Indian politician (born 1962)

Cabinet Minister, Government of Punjab
- Governor: Banwarilal Purohit
- Cabinet: Mann ministry
- Chief Minister: Bhagwant Mann
- Ministry and Departments: Agriculture
- Preceded by: Kuldeep Singh Dhaliwal

Member of Punjab Legislative Assembly
- Incumbent
- Assumed office 10 March 2022
- Constituency: Lambi

President of District Congress Committee Muktsar
- In office 2014–2019

Personal details
- Born: 30 September 1962 (age 63)
- Party: Aam Aadmi Party
- Other political affiliations: Indian National Congress (until 2021)
- Spouse: Bhupinder Kaur
- Children: 2
- Parent: Jagdev Singh Khuddian (father)
- Profession: Agriculture
- Website: Gurmeet Singh Khuddian on Facebook

Gurmeet Singh Khuddian (born 30 September 1962) is an Indian politician and member of Aam Aadmi Party. He is currently serving as a member of the Punjab Legislative Assembly from Lambi. He defeated SAD Veteran and Patron of Shiromani Akali Dal Parkash Singh Badal from Lambi in 2022 Punjab Assembly Elections. He is the son of former Member of Parliament Jagdev Singh Khuddian.

== Personal life ==
Gurmeet's father Jagdev Singh Khuddian was elected Member of Parliament from Faridkot constituency in 1989. His father went missing under mysterious circumstances after being elected to the lower house of the Parliament in 1989. Six days later the body of Khuddian was found from Rajasthan Feeder Canal. He is agriculturist by profession.

== Political career ==
Gurmeet Khuddian was associated with the Indian National Congress from 2004 before joining the Aam Aadmi Party. He was the covering candidate for Capt.Amarinder Singh during the 2017 Punjab Legislative Assembly Elections. He was a strong contender for Chairman's post during the Congress Government in Punjab.

Gurmeet remained President of District Congress Committee, Muktsar for five years. After feeling ignored by the Congress Party, he quit the party and joined the Aam Aadmi Party in July, 2021.

Soon after joining the Aam Aadmi Party Gurmeet was declared the candidate for Aam Aadmi Party from Lambi against the Patron of Shiromani Akali Dal Parkash Singh Badal. Gurmeet Khuddian defeated the SAD veteran Parkash Singh Badal who was a 11 time MLA, 5 time former Chief Minister from his home turf Lambi by a margin of more than 11000 votes. After winning the election Khuddian stated, "It is people's victory. Youth has brought a new Inquilab." The Aam Aadmi Party gained a strong 79% majority in the sixteenth Punjab Legislative Assembly by winning 92 out of 117 seats in the 2022 Punjab Legislative Assembly election. MP Bhagwant Mann was sworn in as Chief Minister on 16 March 2022.

== Member of Legislative Assembly ==
He represents the Lambi Assembly constituency as MLA in Punjab Assembly.

Committee assignments of Punjab Legislative Assembly

- Member (2022–23) Committee on Panchayati Raj Institutions

== Electoral performance ==
Punjab Assembly election, 2022: Lambi
Party	Candidate	Votes	%	±%
AAP	Gurmeet Singh Khuddian	66,313	48.87	▲32.88
SAD	Parkash Singh Badal	54,917	40.47	▼9.48
INC	Jagpal Singh Abul Khurana	10,136	7.47	▼32.81
SAD(A)	Jaswinder Singh	1,318	0.97	▲0.57
NOTA	None of the above	1,226	0.9	▲0.07
BJP	Rakesh Dhingra	1,116	0.82	New
Majority		11,396	8.4	▼8.74
Turnout		135,697		
Registered electors		165,825		
AAP gain from SAD		Swing		

2024 Indian general election: Bathinda
Party	Candidate	Votes	%	±%
SAD	Harsimrat Kaur Badal	376,558	32.71	▼8.81
AAP	Gurmeet Singh Khuddian	326,902	28.40	▲17.21
INC	Jeet Mohinder Singh Sidhu	202,011	17.55	▼21.75
BJP	Parampal Kaur Sidhu	110,762	9.62	New
SAD(A)	Lakha Sidhana	84,684	7.36	New
NOTA	None of the Above	4,933	0.43	▼0.67
Majority		49,656	4.31	▲2.50
Turnout		1,151,170		
Registered electors		16,51,188		
SAD hold		Swing	▼8.81	
