= Jagdev Singh Khuddian =

Indian politician

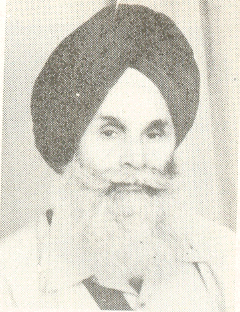

Member of Parliament, Lok Sabha
- In office 1989-1989
- Constituency: Faridkot

Personal details
- Born: 1937
- Died: 3 January 1990
- Party: Shiromani Akali Dal (Amritsar)
- Children: Gurmeet Singh Khudian; Harmeet Singh Khudian

Jathedar Jagdev Singh Khuddian (1937–1989) was a Sikh politician from Punjab who was Member of Parliament, winning from Faridkot in 1989 for the Shiromani Akali Dal (Amritsar) party.

== Personal life ==
Jathedar Jagdev Singh Khuddian was born in 1937 in Faridkot, Punjab, India. He was Graduated from Khalsa College, Amritsar, Punjab, India. He was an Agriculturist by profession. His hobbies were reading literature and writing.

== Political Life ==
Jathedar Jagdev Singh Khuddian got nominated in 1977 as Chairman, Punjab Marketing Board. Then he got elected as Member of Parliament, Lok Sabha from Faridkot in 1989.

== Death ==
On 28 December 1989 Khuddian had disappeared from his home in Khudian village. Six days later his body was fished out of the nearby Rajasthan Feeder Canal.
