= Harpal Singh Cheema =

Indian politician (born 1974)

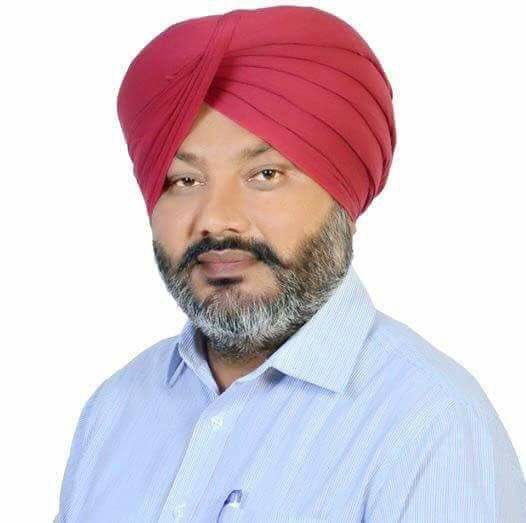

Cabinet Minister, Government of Punjab
- Incumbent
- Assumed office 21 March 2022
- Governor: Banwarilal Purohit; Gulab Chand Kataria
- Cabinet: Mann ministry
- Chief Minister: Bhagwant Mann
- Ministry and Departments: Finance; Planning; Programme Implementation; Excise & Taxation
- Preceded by: Manpreet Singh Badal

Punjab Cabinet minister for Dept. of Cooperation
- In office 21 March 2022 – 4 July 2022
- Preceded by: Sukhjinder Singh Randhawa
- Succeeded by: Bhagwant Mann

Member of the Punjab Legislative Assembly
- Incumbent
- Assumed office 11 March 2017
- Preceded by: Balvir Singh
- Constituency: Dirba

Leader of the Opposition in Punjab Legislative assembly
- In office 27 July 2018 – 10 March 2022
- Governor: V. P. Singh Badnore Banwarilal Purohit
- Preceded by: Sukhpal Singh Khaira
- Succeeded by: Pratap Singh Bajwa

Personal details
- Born: 10 February 1974 (age 52) Nabha, Punjab, India
- Party: Aam Aadmi Party
- Education: Punjabi University, Patiala
- Occupation: Politician

Harpal Singh Cheema (born 10 February 1974) is an Aam Aadmi Party MLA from Dirba Assembly constituency located in Sangrur District, Punjab. In March 2022, he became first Dalit to be a finance minister of Punjab. He joined the Aam Aadmi Party just before the 2017 Punjab Legislative Assembly election. He contested and won the election from Dirba Assembly constituency against a popular Punjabi Kabaddi player Gulzar Singh Moonak from Shiromani Akali Dal and Ajaib Singh Ratolan from Indian National Congress. In July 2018 he was appointed leader of opposition of Punjab Legislative Assembly.

== Career ==
A graduate from Government Ranbir College, Sangrur, and having done his LLB from Punjabi University, Patiala, he also participated in student politics as the campus president of Left-leaning Students' Federation of India (SFI) while studying law. He led the Sangrur Bar Association in 2014. As a lawyer, he is also fighting AAP’s Delhi MLA Naresh Yadav’s case in the district courts over accusations of Quran desecration in Malerkotla in 2016.

== Member of Legislative Assembly, 2017–2022 ==
In a triangular fight from Dirba, he defeated Congress candidate Ajaib Singh Ratol and Shiromani Akali Dal’s Gulzar Singh.

In 2017–2018 he was in the Punjab Assembly committee on government assurances. From 2017 to 2019, he was in the committee on welfare of Scheduled Castes and Scheduled Tribes and Other Backward Class.

Committee assignments of Punjab Legislative Assembly

- Member (2017–2018) Committee on Government Assurances
- Member (2017–2019) Committee on Welfare of Scheduled Castes, Scheduled Tribes and Backward Classes

== Leader of opposition ==
In Fifteenth Punjab Legislative Assembly Aam Aadmi Party was the main opposition party. Since July 2018, Cheema served as the leader of opposition with Saravjit Kaur Manuke as the deputy leader of opposition. His term as the leader of the opposition ended with the dissolution of the Fifteenth Punjab assembly on 11 March 2022. The dissolution was necessitated after the results of the election were declared on 10 March.

== Member of Legislative Assembly, 2022–2027 ==
He was elected as the MLA in the 2022 Punjab Legislative Assembly election. He represented the Dirba Assembly constituency in the Punjab Legislative Assembly. Cheema took oath as a cabinet minister along with nine other MLAs on 19 March at Guru Nanak Dev auditorium of Punjab Raj Bhavan in Chandigarh. The Aam Aadmi Party gained a strong 79% majority in the sixteenth Punjab Legislative Assembly by winning 92 out of 117 seats in the 2022 Punjab Legislative Assembly election. MP Bhagwant Mann was sworn in as Chief Minister on 16 March 2022.

In September 2022, Aam Aadmi Party, the ruling party in Punjab, accused BJP of spending ₹1375 Crore in Punjab to bribe the AAP MLAs under Operation Lotus. Punjab's Finance Minister Harpal Singh Cheema said in a press conference, "Our MLAs have been approached with offers of up to Rs 25 crore to break away from AAP. The MLAs were told: “bade bau ji se milwayenge”. These MLAs have also been offered big posts. They were told that if you get more MLAs along, you would be given up to Rs 75 crore."

== Cabinet Minister ==
As a cabinet minister in the Mann ministry, Cheema was given the charge of five departments of the Punjab Government:

1. Department of Finance
2. Department of Planning
3. Department of Programme Implementation
4. Department of Excise & Taxation
5. Department of Cooperation

On 5 July, Bhagwant Mann announced the expansion of his cabinet of ministers with five new ministers to the departments of Punjab state government. Cheema's charge of Cooperation ministry ended on 5 July with CM Bhagwant Mann taking the charge of the same. Cheema continued to hold the charge of following departments.

1. Department of Finance
2. Department of Planning
3. Department of Programme Implementation
4. Department of Excise & Taxation

== Electoral performance ==
2017 Punjab Legislative Assembly election: Dirba
Party	Candidate	Votes	%	±%
AAP	Harpal Singh Cheema	46,434	32.12	
INC	Ajaib Singh Ratolan	44,789	30.99	
SAD	Gulzar Singh	44,777	30.98	
Independent	Darshan Singh Sidhu	2,875	1.99	
BSP	Harwinder Singh	2,081	1.44	
SAD(A)	Mandeep Singh	1,779	1.23	
Communist Party of India (Marxist-Leninist)	Gharmand Singh	789	0.55	
Independent	Bikar Singh	630	0.44	
APP	Jagtar Singh	369	0.26	
Registered electors		174,214		
AAP gain from SAD		Swing		

2022 Punjab Legislative Assembly election: Dirba
Party	Candidate	Votes	%	±%
AAP	Harpal Singh Cheema	82,630	56.89	
SAD	Gulzar Singh Moonak	31,975	22.01	
INC	Ajaib Singh Rataul	10,472	7.21	
SAD(A)	Mandeep Singh	9,000	6.20	
SAD(S)	Soma Singh	4,760	3.30	
NOTA	None of the above	1002	0.69	
Majority		50,655	34.88	
Turnout		145,257		
Registered electors		183,788		
AAP hold				

== Family ==
Son of Mehar Singh and Manjeet Kaur, he was born in Cheema village in Dhuri subdivision, he has five siblings, two brothers and three sisters. Now he lives in Sangrur with his wife and a daughter.

Political offices
Preceded by Sukhpal Singh Khaira	Leader of Opposition in 15th Punjab Assembly; 2018–2022	Succeeded by Pratap Singh Bajwa
Preceded by Sukhjinder Singh Randhawa	Punjab Cabinet minister for Cooperation; March–July 2022	Succeeded by Bhagwant Maan
Preceded by Manpreet Singh Badal	Punjab Cabinet minister for Finance since 2022	Incumbent
Preceded by Manpreet Singh Badal	Punjab Cabinet minister for Excise & Taxation since 2022	Incumbent
Preceded by Manpreet Singh Badal	Punjab Cabinet minister for Planning since 2022	Incumbent
Preceded by Manpreet Singh Badal	Punjab Cabinet minister for Programme Implementation since 2022	Incumbent
State Legislative Assembly
Preceded by Balvir Singh	Member of the Punjab Legislative Assembly from Dirba Assembly constituency since 2017	Incumbent
