= Mann ministry =

Current government of Punjab, India

- 26th Ministry of the State of Punjab

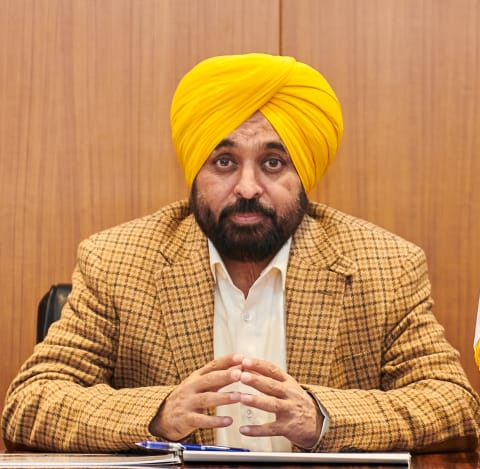
- Bhagwant Mann; Chief Minister of Punjab

People and organisations
- Governor: Gulab Chand Kataria
- Chief Minister: Bhagwant Mann
- No. of ministers: 16
- Member parties: Aam Aadmi Party
- Status in legislature: 3/4th Majority
- Opposition party: Indian National Congress
- Opposition leader: Pratap Singh Bajwa

History
- Election: 2022
- Outgoing election: 2017
- Legislature term: 5 years
- Predecessor: Channi ministry

The Bhagwant Mann ministry is the State Cabinet of Punjab, India headed by the present Chief Minister Bhagwant Mann. The oath-taking ceremony of Mann was held at Khatkar Kalan village on 16 March 2022. The 10 cabinet ministers took oath on 19 March.

Mann holds the home ministry among other portfolios. Harpal Singh Cheema is the finance minister. Harjot Singh Bains is the Education minister.

== History ==
=== Inauguration ===
On 10 March, the election results were announced. The Aam Aadmi Party gained a full majority in the sixteenth Punjab Legislative Assembly by winning 92 seats out of 117 total. The opposition parties are the Indian National Congress, the Bharatiya Janata Party, the Shiromani Akali Dal, and the Bahujan Samaj Party.

On 11 March 2022, AAP Punjab convener and MP Bhagwant Mann was elected by the AAP legislative members as their leader in the assembly. Mann took oath as the Chief Minister in the Punjab government in a public ceremony at Khatkar Kalan village on 16 March, when the term of the incumbent Fifteenth Punjab Legislative Assembly expired. 10 cabinet ministers took oath on 19 March at Guru Nanak Dev auditorium of Punjab Raj Bhavan in Chandigarh. Eight ministers who took oath were greenhorn (first term) Members of Legislative Assembly (MLA) while two were in their second term.

The cabinet can have at most 18 ministers, but Mann decided to appoint a smaller cabinet. Mann has set targets for every minister to achieve, saying people "can demand that the minister be removed" if the targets are not met.

=== Shuffling in the cabinet ===
In May 2022, health minister Vijay Singla was removed from cabinet, after corruption charges were raised against him.

5 MLAs were inducted into the cabinet and their swearing in ceremony took place on 4 July 2022.

On 7 January 2023, cabinet minister Fauja Singh Sarari resigned as cabinet minister upon corruption allegations following an alleged audio clip of him discussing how to extort money from contractors. He responded by denying the allegations and dubbing the clip of him "doctored". He was replaced by Dr. Balbir Singh.

On 31 May 2023, cabinet minister Inderbir Singh Nijjar resigned as cabinet minister on personal grounds.He was replaced with Balkar Singh. Along with him, Gurmeet Singh Khuddian was also given a place in cabinet by allocating him an important portfolio of Agriculture and farmers welfare among others. in January 2026 Skoon Bhandari was given the approval to be the Home Minister of State, Sports and YouthAaffairs and local body Minister for State by the Mann Government.

== Council of Ministers ==
=== Minister of State ===
| Portfolio | Minister | Took office | Left office | Party | Ref |
|---|---|---|---|---|---|
| Chief Minister; Civil Aviation; Cooperation; General Administration; Home Affairs & Justice; Legal & Legislative Affairs; Personnel and Training; Sports and Youth Services; Science Technology & Environment; Vigilance; Other departments not allocated to any Minister | Bhagwant Mann | 16 March 2022 | Incumbent | AAP | |
| Economic & Statistical Organisation; Excise & Taxation; Finance; Planning; Programme Implementation | Harpal Singh Cheema | 21 March 2022 | Incumbent | AAP | |
| Employment Generation and Training; Governance Reforms and Public Grievances; New and Renewable Energy Sources; Printing & Stationery | Aman Arora | 5 July 2022 | Incumbent | AAP | |
| Social Justice, Empowerment & Minorities; Social Security and Development of Women and Children | Baljit Kaur | 21 March 2022 | Incumbent | AAP | |
| Elections; Health and Family Welfare; Medical Education and Research | Dr. Balbir Singh | 7 January 2023 | Incumbent | AAP | |
| Food, Civil Supplies & Consumer Affairs; Forest and Wild Life Preservation | Lal Chand Kataruchakk | 21 March 2022 | Incumbent | AAP | |
| Jails; Transport | Laljit Singh Bhullar | 21 March 2022 | Incumbent | AAP | |
| Higher Education and Languages; Information & Public Relations; School Education; Technical Education & Industrial Training | Harjot Singh Bains | 21 March 2022 | Incumbent | AAP | |
| Power; Public Works | Harbhajan Singh ETO | 21 March 2022 | Incumbent | AAP | |
| Agriculture and Farmer Welfare; Animal Husbandry, Fisheries & Dairy Development; Food Processing | Gurmeet Singh Khudian | 31 May 2023 | Incumbent | AAP | |
| Defence Services Welfare; Freedom Fighters; Horticulture | Mohinder Bhagat | 23 September 2024 | Incumbent | AAP | |
| Hospitality; Labour; Rural Development & Panchayats; Tourism & Culture Affairs | Tarunpreet Singh Sond | 23 September 2024 | Incumbent | AAP | |
| Local Government; Parliamentary Affairs | Ravjot Singh | 23 September 2024 | Incumbent | AAP | |
| Conservation of Soil and Water; Mines & Geology; Water Resources | Barinder Kumar Goyal | 23 September 2024 | Incumbent | AAP | |
| Housing and Urban Development; Revenue, Rehabilitation and Disaster Management; Water Supply & Sanitation | Hardeep Singh Mundian | 23 September 2024 | Incumbent | AAP | |
| Investment Promotion; Industries & Commerce; NRI Affairs | Sanjeev Arora (politician) | 3 July 2025 | Incumbent | AAP | |

=== By departments ===
An alphabetical list of all the departments of Punjab Government with terms :

| Portfolio | Minister | Took office | Left office |
|---|---|---|---|
| Agriculture and Farmer Welfare | Bhagwant Mann | 16 March 2022 | 5 July 2022 |
| Agriculture and Farmer Welfare | Kuldeep Singh Dhaliwal | 5 July 2022 | 31 May 2023 |
| Agriculture and Farmer Welfare | Gurmeet Singh Khudian | 31 May 2023 | Incumbent |
| Animal Husbandry, Dairy Development and Fisheries | Kuldeep Singh Dhaliwal | 21 March 2022 | 5 July 2022 |
| Animal Husbandry, Dairy Development and Fisheries | Laljit Singh Bhullar | 5 July 2022 | 31 May 2023 |
| Animal Husbandry, Dairy Development and Fisheries | Gurmeet Singh Khudian | 31 May 2023 | Incumbent |
| Civil Aviation | Bhagwant Mann | 16 March 2022 | Incumbent |
| Conservation of Soil & Water | Bhagwant Mann | 16 March 2022 | 5 July 2022 |
| Conservation of Soil & Water | Inderbir Singh Nijjar | 5 July 2022 | 31 May 2023 |
| Conservation of Soil & Water | Gurmeet Singh Meet Hayer | 31 May 2023 | 21 November 2023 |
| Conservation of Soil & Water | Chetan Singh Jauramajra | 21 November 2023 | 23 September 2024 |
| Conservation of Soil & Water | Barinder Kumar Goyal | 23 September 2024 | Incumbent |
| Cooperation | Harpal Singh Cheema | 21 March 2022 | 5 July 2022 |
| Cooperation | Bhagwant Mann | 5 July 2022 | Incumbent |
| Defence Services Welfare | Bhagwant Mann | 16 March 2022 | 5 July 2022 |
| Defence Services Welfare | Fauja Singh Sarari | 5 July 2022 | 7 January 2023 |
| Defence Services Welfare | Chetan Singh Jauramajra | 7 January 2023 | 23 September 2024 |
| Defence Services Welfare | Mohinder Bhagat | 23 September 2024 | Incumbent |
| Economic & Statistical Organisation | Harpal Singh Cheema | 16 March 2022 | Incumbent |
| Elections | Bhagwant Mann | 16 March 2022 | 5 July 2022 |
| Elections | Chetan Singh Jauramajra | 5 July 2022 | 7 January 2023 |
| Elections | Dr. Balbir Singh | 7 January 2023 | Incumbent |
| Employment Generation and Training | Bhagwant Mann | 16 March 2022 | 16 March 2023 |
| Employment Generation and Training | Aman Arora | 16 March 2023 | Incumbent |
| Excise and Taxation | Harpal Singh Cheema | 21 March 2022 | Incumbent |
| Finance | Harpal Singh Cheema | 21 March 2022 | Incumbent |
| Food, Civil Supplies and Consumer Affairs | Lal Chand Kataruchakk | 21 March 2022 | Incumbent |
| Food Processing | Bhagwant Mann | 16 March 2022 | 5 July 2022 |
| Food Processing | Fauja Singh Sarari | 5 July 2022 | 7 January 2023 |
| Food Processing | Chetan Singh Jauramajra | 7 January 2023 | 16 March 2023 |
| Food Processing | Laljit Singh Bhullar | 16 March 2023 | 31 May 2023 |
| Food Processing | Gurmeet Singh Khudian | 31 May 2023 | Incumbent |
| Forest and Wild Life Preservation | Lal Chand Kataruchakk | 21 March 2022 | Incumbent |
| General Administration | Bhagwant Mann | 16 March 2022 | Incumbent |
| Governance Reforms and Public Grievances | Bhagwant Mann | 16 March 2022 | 5 July 2022 |
| Governance Reforms and Public Grievances | Gurmeet Singh Meet Hayer | 5 July 2022 | 16 March 2023 |
| Governance Reforms and Public Grievances | Aman Arora | 16 March 2023 | Incumbent |
| Health & Family Welfare | Vijay Singla | 21 March 2022 | 24 May 2022 |
| Health & Family Welfare | Bhagwant Mann | 24 May 2022 | 5 July 2022 |
| Health & Family Welfare | Chetan Singh Jauramajra | 5 July 2022 | 7 January 2023 |
| Health & Family Welfare | Dr. Balbir Singh | 7 January 2023 | Incumbent |
| Higher Education and Languages | Gurmeet Singh Meet Hayer | 21 March 2022 | 7 January 2023 |
| Higher Education and Languages | Harjot Singh Bains | 7 January 2023 | Incumbent |
| Home Affairs and Justice | Bhagwant Mann | 16 March 2022 | Incumbent |
| Horticulture | Bhagwant Mann | 16 March 2022 | 5 July 2022 |
| Horticulture | Fauja Singh Sarari | 5 July 2022 | 7 January 2023 |
| Horticulture | Chetan Singh Jauramajra | 7 January 2023 | 23 September 2024 |
| Horticulture | Mohinder Bhagat | 23 September 2024 | Incumbent |
| Hospitality | Laljit Singh Bhullar | 21 March 2022 | 5 July 2022 |
| Hospitality | Bhagwant Mann | 5 July 2022 | 7 January 2023 |
| Hospitality | Anmol Gagan Maan | 7 January 2023 | 23 September 2024 |
| Hospitality | Tarunpreet Singh Sond | 23 September 2024 | Incumbent |
| Housing and Urban Development | Bhagwant Mann | 16 March 2022 | 5 July 2022 |
| Housing and Urban Development | Aman Arora | 5 July 2022 | 16 March 2023 |
| Housing and Urban Development | Bhagwant Mann | 16 March 2023 | 23 September 2024 |
| Housing and Urban Development | Hardeep Singh Mundian | 23 September 2024 | Incumbent |
| Industries and Commerce | Bhagwant Mann | 16 March 2022 | 23 September 2024 |
| Industries and Commerce | Tarunpreet Singh Sond | 23 September 2024 | 3 July 2025 |
| Industries and Commerce | Sanjeev Arora (politician) | 3 July 2025 | Incumbent |
| Information and Public Relation | Bhagwant Mann | 16 March 2022 | 5 July 2022 |
| Information and Public Relation | Aman Arora | 5 July 2022 | 16 March 2023 |
| Information and Public Relation | Chetan Singh Jauramajra | 16 March 2023 | 23 September 2024 |
| Information and Public Relation | Harjot Singh Bains | 23 September 2024 | Incumbent |
| Information Technology | Bhagwant Mann | 16 March 2022 | Incumbent |
| Investment Promotion | Bhagwant Mann | 16 March 2022 | 5 July 2022 |
| Investment Promotion | Anmol Gagan Maan | 5 July 2022 | 23 September 2024 |
| Investment Promotion | Tarunpreet Singh Sond | 23 September 2024 | Incumbent |
| Jails | Harjot Singh Bains | 21 March 2022 | 7 January 2023 |
| Jails | Bhagwant Mann | 7 January 2023 | 23 September 2024 |
| Jails | Laljit Singh Bhullar | 23 September 2024 | Incumbent |
| Labour | Bhagwant Mann | 16 March 2022 | 5 July 2022 |
| Labour | Anmol Gagan Maan | 5 July 2022 | 23 September 2024 |
| Labour | Tarunpreet Singh Sond | 23 September 2024 | Incumbent |
| Legal and Legislative Affairs | Harjot Singh Bains | 21 March 2022 | 5 July 2022 |
| Legal and Legislative Affairs | Bhagwant Mann | 5 July 2022 | Incumbent |
| Local Government | Bhagwant Mann | 16 March 2022 | 5 July 2022 |
| Local Government | Inderbir Singh Nijjar | 5 July 2022 | 31 May 2023 |
| Local Government | Balkar Singh | 31 May 2023 | 23 September 2024 |
| Local Government | Ravjot Singh | 23 September 2024 | Incumbent |
| Mines & Geology | Harjot Singh Bains | 21 March 2022 | 7 January 2023 |
| Mines & Geology | Gurmeet Singh Meet Hayer | 7 January 2023 | 21 November 2023 |
| Mines & Geology | Chetan Singh Jauramajra | 21 November 2023 | 23 September 2024 |
| Mines & Geology | Barinder Kumar Goyal | 23 September 2024 | Incumbent |
| Medical Education and Research | Vijay Singla | 21 March 2022 | 24 May 2022 |
| Medical Education and Research | Bhagwant Mann | 24 May 2022 | 5 July 2022 |
| Medical Education and Research | Chetan Singh Jauramajra | 5 July 2022 | 7 January 2023 |
| Medical Education and Research | Dr. Balbir Singh | 7 January 2023 | Incumbent |
| New & Renewable Energy Sources | Bhagwant Mann | 16 March 2022 | 5 July 2022 |
| New & Renewable Energy Sources | Aman Arora | 5 July 2022 | Incumbent |
| NRI Affairs | Kuldeep Singh Dhaliwal | 21 March 2022 | 3 July 2025 |
| NRI Affairs | Sanjeev Arora (politician) | 3 July 2025 | Incumbent |
| Parliamentary Affairs | Bhagwant Mann | 16 March 2022 | 5 July 2022 |
| Parliamentary Affairs | Inderbir Singh Nijjar | 5 July 2022 | 31 May 2023 |
| Parliamentary Affairs | Balkar Singh | 31 May 2023 | 23 September 2024 |
| Parliamentary Affairs | Ravjot Singh | 23 September 2024 | Incumbent |
| Personnel and Training | Bhagwant Mann | 16 March 2022 | Incumbent |
| Planning | Harpal Singh Cheema | 21 March 2022 | Incumbent |
| Power | Harbhajan Singh ETO | 21 March 2022 | Incumbent |
| Printing and Stationery | Bhagwant Mann | 16 March 2022 | 5 July 2022 |
| Printing and Stationery | Gurmeet Singh Meet Hayer | 5 July 2022 | 13 January 2023 |
| Printing and Stationery | Aman Arora | 13 January 2023 | Incumbent |
| Program Implementation | Harpal Singh Cheema | 21 March 2022 | Incumbent |
| Public Works | Harbhajan Singh ETO | 21 March 2022 | Incumbent |
| Punjab Energy Development Agency | Bhagwant Mann | 16 March 2022 | Incumbent |
| Removal of Grievances | Bhagwant Mann | 21 March 2022 | 5 July 2022 |
| Removal of Grievances | Anmol Gagan Maan | 5 July 2022 | 16 March 2023 |
| Removal of Grievances | Aman Arora | 16 March 2023 | Incumbent |
| Revenue, Rehabilitation & Disaster Management | Brahm Shankar Jimpa | 21 March 2022 | 23 September 2024 |
| Revenue, Rehabilitation & Disaster Management | Hardeep Singh Mundian | 23 September 2024 | Incumbent |
| Rural Development and Panchayat | Kuldeep Singh Dhaliwal | 21 March 2022 | 31 May 2023 |
| Rural Development and Panchayat | Laljit Singh Bhullar | 31 May 2023 | 23 September 2024 |
| Rural Development and Panchayat | Tarunpreet Singh Sond | 23 September 2024 | Incumbent |
| School Education | Gurmeet Singh Meet Hayer | 21 March 2022 | 5 July 2022 |
| School Education | Harjot Singh Bains | 5 July 2022 | Incumbent |
| Science, Technology & Environment | Bhagwant Mann | 16 March 2022 | 5 July 2022 |
| Science, Technology & Environment | Gurmeet Singh Meet Hayer | 5 July 2022 | 21 November 2023 |
| Science, Technology & Environment | Bhagwant Mann | 21 November 2023 | Incumbent |
| Social Justice, Empowerment and Minorities | Baljit Kaur | 21 March 2022 | Incumbent |
| Social Security and Development of Women and Children | Baljit Kaur | 21 March 2022 | Incumbent |
| Sports and Youth Services | Gurmeet Singh Meet Hayer | 21 March 2022 | 25 June 2024 |
| Sports and Youth Services | Bhagwant Mann | 25 June 2024 | Incumbent |
| Technical Education and Industrial Training | Bhagwant Mann | 16 March 2022 | 7 January 2023 |
| Technical Education and Industrial Training | Harjot Singh Bains | 7 January 2023 | Incumbent |
| Tourism and Cultural Affairs | Harjot Singh Bains | 21 March 2022 | 5 July 2022 |
| Tourism and Cultural Affairs | Anmol Gagan Maan | 5 July 2022 | 23 September 2024 |
| Tourism and Cultural Affairs | Tarunpreet Singh Sond | 23 September 2024 | Incumbent |
| Transport | Laljit Singh Bhullar | 21 March 2022 | Incumbent |
| Vigilance | Bhagwant Mann | 16 March 2022 | Incumbent |
| Water Resources | Brahm Shankar Jimpa | 21 March 2022 | 5 July 2022 |
| Water Resources | Harjot Singh Bains | 5 July 2022 | 7 January 2023 |
| Water Resources | Gurmeet Singh Meet Hayer | 7 January 2023 | 21 November 2023 |
| Water Resources | Chetan Singh Jauramajra | 21 November 2023 | 23 September 2024 |
| Water Resources | Barinder Kumar Goyal | 23 September 2024 | Incumbent |
| Water Supply and Sanitation | Brahm Shankar Jimpa | 21 March 2022 | 23 September 2024 |
| Water Supply and Sanitation | Hardeep Singh Mundian | 23 September 2024 | Incumbent |
| Welfare of Freedom Fighters | Bhagwant Mann | 16 March 2022 | 5 July 2022 |
| Welfare of Freedom Fighters | Fauja Singh Sarari | 5 July 2022 | 7 January 2023 |
| Welfare of Freedom Fighters | Chetan Singh Jauramajra | 7 January 2023 | 23 September 2024 |
| Welfare of Freedom Fighters | Mohinder Bhagat | 23 September 2024 | Incumbent |

=== By year ===
- 2022 : On 21 March, Bhagwant Mann announced the first appointment of ten ministers to the departments of Punjab state government.
Cabinet between March - May 2022

| Portfolio | Minister | Took office | Left office | Party | Ref |
|---|---|---|---|---|---|
| Chief Minister; Administrative Reforms; Civil Aviation; General Administration; Home Affairs & Justice; Personnel; Vigilance; Housing and Urban Development; Local Government; Industries & Commerce; Agriculture and Farmers’ Welfare; Horticulture; Conservation of Land & Water; Food Processing; Investment Promotion; Science Technology & Environment; Parliamentary Affairs; Elections; Removal of Grievances; Freedom Fighters; Technical Education & Industrial Training; Employment Generation & Training; Labour; Printing & Stationery; Defence Services Welfare; Governance Reforms; New and Renewable Energy Sources; Information & Public Relations; Other departments not allocated to any Minister | Bhagwant Mann | 16 March 2022 | Incumbent | AAP | |
| Finance; Planning; Programme Implementation; Excise & Taxation; Cooperation | Harpal Singh Cheema | 21 March 2022 | Incumbent | AAP | |
| Health and Family Welfare; Medical Education and Research | Vijay Singla | 21 March 2022 | 24 May 2022 | AAP | |
| School Education; Sports and Youth Services; Higher Education and Languages | Gurmeet Singh Meet Hayer | 21 March 2022 | Incumbent | AAP | |
| Power; Public Works | Harbhajan Singh ETO | 21 March 2022 | Incumbent | AAP | |
| Food, Civil Supplies & Consumer Affairs; Forest and Wild Life Preservation | Lal Chand Kataruchakk | 21 March 2022 | Incumbent | AAP | |
| Minister of Rural Development & Panchayats; Animal Husbandry, Fisheries & Dairy Development; NRI Affairs | Kuldeep Singh Dhaliwal | 21 March 2022 | Incumbent | AAP | |
| Transport; Hospitality | Laljit Singh Bhullar | 21 March 2022 | Incumbent | AAP | |
| Revenue, Rehabilitation and Disaster Management; Minister of Water Resources; Water Supply & Sanitation | Brahm Shankar Jimpa | 21 March 2022 | Incumbent | AAP | |
| Social Justice, Empowerment & Minorities; Social Security and Development of Women and Children | Baljit Kaur | 21 March 2022 | Incumbent | AAP | |
| Legal & Legislative Affairs; Mines & Geology; Jails; Tourism & Cultural Affairs | Harjot Singh Bains | 21 March 2022 | Incumbent | AAP | |

- 2022 : On 5 July, Bhagwant Mann announced the expansion of cabinet with five new ministers to the departments of Punjab state government.

=== Former Ministers ===
| Portfolio | Minister | Took office | Left office | Party | Ref |
|---|---|---|---|---|---|
| Health and Family Welfare; Medical Education and Research | Vijay Singla | 21 March 2022 | 24 May 2022 | AAP | |
| Defence Services Welfare; Horticulture; Food Processing; Welfare of Freedom Fighters | Fauja Singh Sarari | 5 July 2022 | 7 January 2023 | AAP | |
| Administrative Reforms; Conservation of Soil & Water; Local Government; Parliamentary Affairs | Inderbir Singh Nijjar | 5 July 2022 | 31 May 2023 | AAP | |
| Governance Reforms Water Resources Mines & Geology Science Technology & Environment Sports and Youth Services | Gurmeet Singh Meet Hayer | 21 March 2022 | 27 June 2024 | AAP | |
| NRI affairs | Kuldeep Singh Dhaliwal | 21 March 2022 | 3 July 2025 | AAP | |

Minister for state Skoon Bhandari 17 January 2026.

Home Affairs sports and youth local bodies and Excise.

== Demographics ==
Representation of ministers by district
1. Amritsar (4.16%)
2. Bathinda (4.16%)
3. Barnala (4.16%)
4. Fatehgarh Sahib (4.16%)
5. Fazilka (4.16%)
6. Firozepur (4.16%)
7. Gurdaspur (16.7%)
8. Hoshiarpur (8.33%)
9. Jalandhar (8.33%)
10. Moga (8.33%)
11. Mukatsar (8.33%)
12. Nawan Shahr (4.16%)
13. Pathankot (4.16%)
14. Ropar (4.16%)
15. SAS Nagar (4.16%)
16. Tarn Taran (4.16%)
17. Ludhiana (4.16%)

| District | Ministers | Name of ministers |
|---|---|---|
| Sangrur | 4 | Bhagwant Maan Harpal Singh Cheema Aman Arora Barinder Kumar Goyal |
| Amritsar | 2 | Kuldeep Singh Dhaliwal Harbhajan Singh ETO |
| Ludhiana | 2 | Tarunpreet Singh Sond Hardeep Singh Mundian |
| Jalandhar | 1 | Mohinder Bhagat |
| Bathinda | 1 | Gurmeet Singh Khuddian |
| Hoshiarpur | 1 | Ravjot Singh |
| Patiala district | 1 | Balbir Singh |
| Sri Muktsar Sahib district | 1 | Baljeet Kaur |
| Pathankot | 1 | Lal Chand Kataruchakk |
| Ropar | 1 | Harjot Singh Bains |
| Tarn Taran | 1 | Laljit Singh Bhullar |

Political offices
| Preceded by Channi ministry | Government of Punjab; 2022 – present | Incumbent |
