= List of departments of the government of Punjab, India =

This is a list of Departments of the Government of Punjab, India. For a historical list of ministers who have served in the Punjab government see List of ministers in the Government of Punjab, India. For a list of current ministers see Bhagwant Mann ministry. The Indian government's integrated online directory lists 39 departments. The Punjab state government web portal lists 53 departments.

#	Department	Ministry	Name	Term start	Term End	Party
1	Administrative Reforms	Mann ministry	Inderbir Singh Nijjar	5 July 2022	Incumbent	Aam Aadmi Party
2	Agriculture	Mann ministry	Gurmeet Singh Khudian	31 March 2023	Incumbent	Aam Aadmi Party
3	Animal Husbandry, Dairy Development and Fisheries	Mann ministry	Gurmeet Singh Khudian	31 March 2023	Incumbent	Aam Aadmi Party
4	Civil Aviation	Mann ministry	Bhagwant Mann	16 March 2022	Incumbent	Aam Aadmi Party
5	Conservation of Land & Water	Mann ministry	Bhagwant Mann	16 March 2022	Incumbent	Aam Aadmi Party
6	Cooperation	Mann ministry	Bhagwant Mann	21 March 2022	Incumbent	Aam Aadmi Party
7	Defence Services Welfare	Mann ministry	Bhagwant Mann	16 March 2022	Incumbent	Aam Aadmi Party
8	Economic & Statistical Organisation	Mann ministry	Bhagwant Mann	16 March 2022	Incumbent	Aam Aadmi Party
9	Elections	Mann ministry	Bhagwant Mann	16 March 2022	Incumbent	Aam Aadmi Party
10	Employment Generation and Training	Mann ministry	Chetan Singh Jauramajra	5 July 2022	Incumbent	Aam Aadmi Party
11	Excise and Taxation	Mann ministry	Harpal Singh Cheema	21 March 2022	Incumbent	Aam Aadmi Party
12	Finance	Mann ministry	Harpal Singh Cheema	21 March 2022	Incumbent	Aam Aadmi Party
13	Food, Civil Supplies and Consumer Affairs	Mann ministry	Lal Chand Kataruchakk	21 March 2022	Incumbent	Aam Aadmi Party
14	Food Processing	Mann ministry	Bhagwant Mann	16 March 2022	Incumbent	Aam Aadmi Party
15	Forest and Wild Life Preservation	Mann ministry	Lal Chand Kataruchakk	21 March 2022	Incumbent	Aam Aadmi Party
16	General Administration	Mann ministry	Bhagwant Mann	16 March 2022	Incumbent	Aam Aadmi Party
17	Governance Reforms and Public Grievances	Mann ministry	Bhagwant Mann	16 March 2022	Incumbent	Aam Aadmi Party
18	Health & Family Welfare	Mann ministry	Chetan Singh Jauramajra	5 July 2022	Incumbent	Aam Aadmi Party
19	Higher Education and Languages	Mann ministry	Gurmeet Singh Meet Hayer	21 March 2022	Incumbent	Aam Aadmi Party
20	Home Affairs and Justice	Mann ministry	Bhagwant Mann	16 March 2022	Incumbent	Aam Aadmi Party
21	Horticulture	Mann ministry	Bhagwant Mann	16 March 2022	Incumbent	Aam Aadmi Party
22	Hospitality	Mann ministry	Laljit Singh Bhullar	21 March 2022	Incumbent	Aam Aadmi Party
23	Housing and Urban Development	Mann ministry	Bhagwant Mann	16 March 2022	Incumbent	Aam Aadmi Party
24	Industries and Commerce	Mann ministry	Bhagwant Mann	16 March 2022	Incumbent	Aam Aadmi Party
25	Information and Public Relation	Mann ministry	Bhagwant Mann	16 March 2022	Incumbent	Aam Aadmi Party
26	Information Technology	Mann ministry	Bhagwant Mann	16 March 2022	Incumbent	Aam Aadmi Party
27	Investment Promotion	Mann ministry	Bhagwant Mann	16 March 2022	Incumbent	Aam Aadmi Party
28	Jails	Mann ministry	Harjot Singh Bains	21 March 2022	Incumbent	Aam Aadmi Party
29	Labour	Mann ministry	Bhagwant Mann	16 March 2022	Incumbent	Aam Aadmi Party
30	Legal and Legislative Affairs	Mann ministry	Harjot Singh Bains	21 March 2022	Incumbent	Aam Aadmi Party
31	Local Government	Mann ministry	Bhagwant Mann	16 March 2022	Incumbent	Aam Aadmi Party
32	Mines & Geology	Mann ministry	Harjot Singh Bains	21 March 2022	Incumbent	Aam Aadmi Party
33	Medical Education and Research	Mann ministry	Chetan Singh Jauramajra	5 July 2022	Incumbent	Aam Aadmi Party
34	New & Renewable Energy Sources	Mann ministry	Bhagwant Mann	16 March 2022	Incumbent	Aam Aadmi Party
35	NRI Affairs	Mann ministry	Kuldeep Singh Dhaliwal	21 March 2022	Incumbent	Aam Aadmi Party
36	Parliamentary Affairs	Mann ministry	Bhagwant Mann	16 March 2022	Incumbent	Aam Aadmi Party
37	Personnel	Mann ministry	Bhagwant Mann	16 March 2022	Incumbent	Aam Aadmi Party
38	Planning	Mann ministry	Harpal Singh Cheema	21 March 2022	Incumbent	Aam Aadmi Party
39	Power	Mann ministry	Harbhajan Singh ETO	21 March 2022	Incumbent	Aam Aadmi Party
40	Printing and Stationery	Mann ministry	Bhagwant Mann	16 March 2022	Incumbent	Aam Aadmi Party
41	Program Implementation	Mann ministry	Harpal Singh Cheema	21 March 2022	Incumbent	Aam Aadmi Party
42	Public Works	Mann ministry	Harbhajan Singh ETO	21 March 2022	Incumbent	Aam Aadmi Party
43	Punjab Energy Development Agency	Mann ministry	Bhagwant Mann	16 March 2022	Incumbent	Aam Aadmi Party
44	Revenue, Rehabilitation & Disaster Management	Mann ministry	Brahm Shankar Jimpa	21 March 2022	Incumbent	Aam Aadmi Party
45	Rural Development and Panchayat	Mann ministry	Kuldeep Singh Dhaliwal	21 March 2022	Incumbent	Aam Aadmi Party
46	School Education	Mann ministry	Gurmeet Singh Meet Hayer	21 March 2022	Incumbent	Aam Aadmi Party
47	Science, Technology & Environment	Mann ministry	Bhagwant Mann	16 March 2022	Incumbent	Aam Aadmi Party
48	Social Justice, Empowerment and Minorities	Mann ministry	Baljit Kaur	21 March 2022	Incumbent	Aam Aadmi Party
49	Social Security and Development of Women and Children	Mann ministry	Baljit Kaur	21 March 2022	Incumbent	Aam Aadmi Party
50	Soil & Water Conservation	Mann ministry	Bhagwant Mann	16 March 2022	Incumbent	Aam Aadmi Party
51	Sports and Youth Services	Mann ministry	Gurmeet Singh Meet Hayer	21 March 2022	Incumbent	Aam Aadmi Party
52	Technical Education and Industrial Training	Mann ministry	Bhagwant Mann	16 March 2022	Incumbent	Aam Aadmi Party
53	Tourism and Cultural Affairs	Mann ministry	Harjot Singh Bains	21 March 2022	Incumbent	Aam Aadmi Party
54	Transport	Mann ministry	Laljit Singh Bhullar	21 March 2022	Incumbent	Aam Aadmi Party
55	Vigilance	Mann ministry	Bhagwant Mann	16 March 2022	Incumbent	Aam Aadmi Party
56	Water Resources	Mann ministry	Brahm Shankar Jimpa	21 March 2022	Incumbent	Aam Aadmi Party
57	Water Supply and Sanitation	Mann ministry	Brahm Shankar Jimpa	21 March 2022	Incumbent	Aam Aadmi Party
58	Welfare of Freedom Fighters	Mann ministry	Bhagwant Mann	16 March 2022	Incumbent	Aam Aadmi Party
