= Surjit Singh Rakhra =

Indian politician

MLA, Punjab
- In office 1997-2002
- Preceded by: Jagtar Singh Rajla
- Succeeded by: Brahm Mohindra
- Constituency: Samana
- In office 2012–2017
- Preceded by: Brahm Mahindra
- Constituency: Samana

Water Supply & Sanitation, Higher Education & Languages
- In office 2012–2017

Personal details
- Party: Aam Aadmi Party
- Website: https://www.surjitsinghrakhra.co.in

Surjit Singh Rakhra is an Indian politician who belongs to the Aam Aadmi Party. He was Minister for Water Supply and Sanitation, Higher Education and Languages (2012–2017) in the Punjab Government of Shiromani Akali Dal. In the 2019 Parliament Elections, he lost the election to Preneet Kaur of the Indian National Congress.

== Family ==
His father is Kartar Singh Dhaliwal and his mother is Jaswant Kaur. His brothers, Darshan Singh Dhaliwal and Charanjit Singh Dhaliwal are businessmen in the United States.

== Political career ==
He was elected to the Punjab Legislative Assembly in 2002 on an Akali Dal ticket from Samana. He was re-elected from Samana in 2012. He has served as Minister for water supply and sanitation, higher education and languages in the Punjab government led by Parkash Singh Badal. However, he lost the Parliamentary elections from Patiala in 2019.

== Controversy ==
Rakhra generated considerable controversy when he declared that the alleged killing of a young girl by a bus driver operated by the Badal family that controls the Punjab government was an accident and "God's will".
