= Brahm Mohindra =

Indian politician

Local Government. Parliamentary Affairs. Elections. Removal of Grievances – Punjab Government
- In office 28 September 2021 – 10 March 2022
- Constituency: Patiala Rural

MLA Patiala Rural
- In office 20 May 2012 – 1 January 2017
- Preceded by: Singh
- Succeeded by: Amarinder Singh

Member of Legislative Assembly for Patiala constituency
- In office 1 May 1997 – 20 May 2002

Personal details
- Born: 28 April 1946 (age 79) Doraha, Punjab, British India
- Party: Indian National Congress
- Spouse: Smt. Harpreet Mohindra
- Profession: Politician (1975–present)
- Website: Official website

Brahm Mohindra (born 28 April 1946) is a politician from the state of Punjab, India. He was Minister of Local Government, Parliamentary Affairs, Elections, and Removal of Grievances; and is ranked second in order of precedence among ministers, after the Chief Minister.

== Political career ==
Elections Contested by Brahm Mohindra in Punjab
Year	Constituency	Votes Polled (%)	Name of Primary Opponent	Political Party of Opponent	Votes Polled by opponent (%)
1980	Patiala Town	38.44 (Won)	Shambhu Prasad	BJP	22.3
1985	Patiala Town	46.51 (Won)	Sardara Singh Kohli	Shiromani Akali Dal	42.17
1992	Patiala Town	36.01 (Won)	Krishan Kumar	Independent	31.97
1997	Patiala Town	36.66 (Lost)	Surjit Singh Kohli	Shiromani Akali Dal	52.81
2002	Samana	30.25 (Lost)	Surjit Singh Rakhra	Shiromani Akali DalE	39.92
2007	Samana	46.03 (Won)	Surjit Singh Rakhra	Shiromani Akali Dal	44.51
2012	Patiala Rural	48.52 (Won)	Kuldeep Kaur Tohra	Shiromani Akali Dal	26.95
2017	Patiala Rural	47.30 (Won)	Karambir Singh Thiara	Aam Admi Party	28.6

Brahm Mohindra is associated with Indian National Congress. He has been elected to the Punjab Legislative Assembly six times (1980, 1985, 1992, 2007, 2012, and 2017), and he has lost twice.
