= Punjab Lok Congress =

Indian political party based in Punjab

- Abbreviation: PLC
- Founder: Amarinder Singh
- Founded: 2 November 2021
- Dissolved: 19 September 2022
- Split from: Indian National Congress
- Merged into: Bharatiya Janata Party
- Headquarters: SCO 61-61-63, Sector 9-D, Chandigarh (formerly)
- Colours: Green
- ECI Status: Unrecognised Registered Party
- Alliance: National Democratic Alliance (2021–2022)

Election symbol
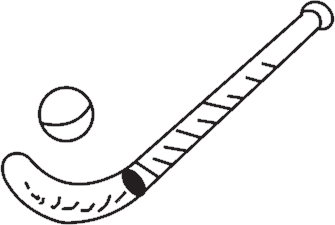

Punjab Lok Congress (abbr. PLC; English: Punjab People's Congress) was an Indian regional political party, with its base in Punjab. It was founded by Amarinder Singh on 2 November 2021, following a split in Indian National Congress in Punjab, after he resigned as Chief Minister of Punjab and quit the Indian National Congress.

The party applied for its official registration with the Election Commission of India on 31 October 2021. On 28 December 2021, the party entered into an alliance with BJP and SAD(S) to contest 2022 Punjab Legislative Assembly election but failed to win any seat. Moreover, the party had got only 84,697 votes and lost election deposit in 27 of the 28 seats contested. On 19 September 2022, the Punjab Lok Congress merged into the Bharatiya Janata Party.

== Notable members ==
- Amarinder Singh, party founder and president
- Luv Kumar Goldy
- Amrik Singh Aliwal
- Ajit Pal Singh
