= Lok Bhavan, Punjab =

Official residence of the governor of Punjab in Chandigarh

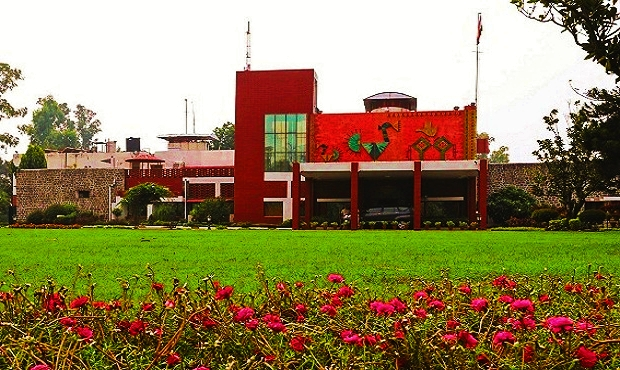
- Lok Bhavan, Punjab
- Former names: Raj Bhavan, Punjab; Punjab Circuit House

General information
- Type: Official residence and office
- Architectural style: Modernist, incorporating the plan of a traditional Indian villa
- Location: Sector 6, Chandigarh 160019, Chandigarh, India
- Coordinates: 30.738783°N 76.810860°E
- Current tenants: Gulab Chand Kataria, Governor of Punjab
- Owner: Government of Punjab
- Operator: Governor's Secretariat, Punjab

Design and construction
- Architect: Pierre Jeanneret

Website
- punjabrajbhavan.gov.in

Lok Bhavan, Punjab (formerly Raj Bhavan, Punjab) is the official residence and principal office of the governor of Punjab. It is situated in Sector 6 of Chandigarh, the shared capital of Punjab and Haryana. The estate is located near Sukhna Lake and the official residence of the governor of Haryana.

The building also serves as an institutional base for the governor in the additional capacity of administrator of the Union Territory of Chandigarh. The two offices have been held concurrently since 1985. The incumbent resident is Gulab Chand Kataria, who took office as the 37th governor of Punjab on 31 July 2024.

== Site and setting ==
Lok Bhavan stands in Chandigarh's northern governmental and institutional area, close to Sukhna Lake. Its official postal address is Lok Bhavan Punjab, Sector 6, Chandigarh 160019. The nearby Haryana governor's residence and the security-sensitive character of the lakefront have made the surrounding roads an important part of Chandigarh's arrangements for official visits and ceremonial events.

The site formed part of land historically associated with Bhangimajra, also known as Ram Nagar, one of the settlements affected by the construction of Chandigarh. A 2016 account of the displaced villages reported that land at Bhangimajra was acquired for the Punjab Governor's House.

== History ==
=== Unbuilt Governor's Palace ===
In March 1953, Le Corbusier prepared some of the first sketches for a monumental Governor's Palace at the Chandigarh Capitol Complex. The proposed palace was conceived as one of four principal institutions representing democratic government. The other three were the House of Ministers, now the Secretariat; the House of Justice, now the Punjab and Haryana High Court; and the House of Members, now the Legislative Assembly.

The Governor's Palace was never constructed. Consequently, the governor required an alternative residence and workplace outside the monumental Capitol scheme.

=== Conversion of the Circuit House ===
The Punjab government selected a Circuit House designed by Swiss architect Pierre Jeanneret, a member of the architectural team responsible for the development of Chandigarh. The building had originally been planned as accommodation for senior government officials visiting the new capital. It was subsequently adapted to function as the governor's residence and office.

Unlike the proposed monumental palace, the Circuit House was designed to be functional and relatively unpretentious. According to the official history of Lok Bhavan, the design followed the broader architectural philosophy associated with Le Corbusier while drawing upon the arrangement of a traditional Indian villa.

Since 1985, the governor of Punjab has also served as the administrator of Chandigarh. Lok Bhavan therefore supports both the governor's constitutional responsibilities in Punjab and the administrative responsibilities attached to the Union Territory.

=== Renaming as Lok Bhavan ===
On 4 December 2025, the Governor's Secretariat ordered that Raj Bhavan, Punjab, be renamed Lok Bhavan, Punjab with immediate effect. The order followed a communication issued by the Union Ministry of Home Affairs on 25 November 2025 concerning the renaming of governors' official residences.

The change formed part of a wider national initiative to replace the name Raj Bhavan with Lok Bhavan. The government presented the terminology as placing greater emphasis on public service, accessibility and democratic participation. The Punjab notification required the new name to be used in official correspondence, records and signage. Kataria described the change as reflecting democratic values and public participation.

== Architecture ==
=== Main building ===
Jeanneret designed the original Circuit House around the requirements of Chandigarh's climate. The principal occupied spaces were oriented towards the north or east to reduce exposure to intense summer sunlight. The southern and western elevations were protected by verandahs and other shading devices.

Other passive cooling measures included cavity walls, perforated parapets, surrounding vegetation and water features. Trees and shrubs were incorporated into the landscaping to provide shade and reduce heat around the structure. Collectively, these features were intended to keep the interior naturally cooler during Chandigarh's summers.

The official history describes the building as sturdy, functional and intended to provide comfort without the ceremonial grandeur originally envisioned for the unbuilt Governor's Palace. An elevator block on the western side was added after the original design had been completed.

=== Grounds and Mini Rock Garden ===
In 2017, the Chandigarh Administration approved a proposal to install a small replica of Chandigarh's Rock Garden near the entrance to Raj Bhavan. The project was initially estimated to cost ₹14.25 lakh. It was developed with the assistance of Anuj Saini, the son of Rock Garden creator Nek Chand.

The proposed installation included sculptures of camels, ducks, peacocks, dogs, wolves and deer, reflecting Nek Chand's practice of creating figures from discarded and recycled materials. The Mini Rock Garden was subsequently documented in the coffee-table book Punjab Raj Bhawan Mini Rock Garden—A Tribute to Padma Shri Nek Chand, which was presented to Punjab Chief Minister Amarinder Singh in August 2021.

=== Guru Nanak Dev Auditorium ===
The Lok Bhavan complex contains the Guru Nanak Dev Auditorium. The multipurpose auditorium was inaugurated by Governor Banwarilal Purohit on 4 March 2022. It was described at its inauguration as a technologically equipped venue intended to allow official, ceremonial and other high-profile events to be held within the Lok Bhavan complex.

The auditorium is named after Guru Nanak, the founder of Sikhism. It has been used for oath-taking ceremonies, conferences, educational functions, cultural programmes and religious commemorations.

== Official and ceremonial use ==
Lok Bhavan functions as both a residence and a working governmental establishment. It accommodates meetings between the governor and elected representatives, civil servants, members of the judiciary, diplomats and visiting dignitaries. It is also used for the administration of oaths to ministers and other state office-holders.

On 19 March 2022, ten members of the Bhagwant Mann ministry took the oaths of office and secrecy in the newly inaugurated Guru Nanak Dev Auditorium. The oaths were administered by Governor Banwarilal Purohit.

The complex has also received visiting national office-holders. On 8 October 2022, President Droupadi Murmu attended a civic reception hosted in her honour at Punjab Raj Bhavan after participating in the Indian Air Force's 90th-anniversary celebrations at Sukhna Lake.

Lok Bhavan is used for educational and civic outreach programmes. In July 2024, Raj Bhavan hosted an event recognising 300 government-school students from Punjab and Chandigarh. The programme included awards, a meal for students and accompanying teachers, and a tour of the premises.

Cultural and interfaith programmes are also held in the auditorium and grounds. A shabad kirtan commemorating the 350th anniversary of the martyrdom of Guru Tegh Bahadur was held in the Guru Nanak Dev Auditorium in July 2025.

The governor traditionally hosts an At Home reception at the residence on national occasions such as Independence Day. These receptions bring together representatives of the Punjab and Haryana governments, the Chandigarh Administration, the armed forces, the judiciary and other invited dignitaries. Governor Kataria hosted the Independence Day reception at Punjab Raj Bhavan on 16 August 2025.

== See also ==
- Governor's Palace, Chandigarh, the unbuilt palace proposed for the Capitol Complex
- Lok Bhavan, Haryana
- Chandigarh Capitol Complex
- Government Houses of the British Indian Empire
- List of governors of Punjab, India
- List of administrators of Chandigarh
- Pierre Jeanneret

== See also ==
- Government Houses of the British Indian Empire
- List of governors of Punjab (British India)
