= 11th Punjab Assembly =

Members of Punjab Legislative Assembly

Fifteenth Legislative Assembly of Punjab

Type
- Type: Unicameral
- Houses: Punjab Legislative Assembly

History
- Founded: March 1997
- Disbanded: March 2002
- Preceded by: 10th Punjab Assembly
- Succeeded by: 12th Punjab Assembly

Leadership
- Speaker: Charanjit Singh Atwal

Structure
- Seats: 117
- Length of term: 2017-2022

Elections
- Voting system: First-past-the-post
- Last election: February 1997
- Next election: February 2002

1997 Punjab Legislative Assembly election for the constitution of the Eleventh Legislative Assembly of Punjab was held in the Indian state of Punjab.

The term of the tenth Punjab assembly ended with its dissolution on 11 March 1996. The dissolution was necessitated after the results of the election was declared.

== Composition ==
=== By alliance ===
S.No.	Alliance	Seats
1.	Akali Dal Alliance	95
2.	Congress Alliance	16
3.	BSP Alliance	2
Total		113

=== By party ===
Summary of results of the Punjab Legislative Assembly election, 1997
Political Party	Seats won
Shiromani Akali Dal	75
Bharatiya Janata Party	18
Indian National Congress	14
Communist Party of India	2
Bahujan Samaj Party	1
Shiromani Akali Dal (M)	1
Independents	6
Total	117

== Members of Legislative Assembly ==
S.No.	AC Name	AC No.	Type	Member	Party
1	Abohar	91	GEN	Ram Kumar	Bharatiya Janta Party
2	Adampur	28	GEN	Saroop Singh	Shiromani Akali Dal
3	Ajnala	20	GEN	Rattan Singh	Shiromani Akali Dal
4	Amloh	78	SC	Balwant Singh	Shiromani Akali Dal
5	Amritsar Central	18	GEN	Laxmi Kanta Chawla	Bharatiya Janta Party
6	Amritsar North	16	GEN	Baldev Raj Chawla	Bharatiya Janta Party
7	Amritsar South	19	GEN	Manjit Singh Calcutta	Shiromani Akali Dal
8	Amritsar West	17	GEN	Om Parkash Soni	Independent
9	Anandpur Sahib-Ropar	66	GEN	Tara Singh	Shiromani Akali Dal
10	Attari	22	SC	Gulzar Singh	Shiromani Akali Dal
11	Bagha Purana	100	GEN	Sadhu Singh	Shiromani Akali Dal
12	Balachaur	44	GEN	Nand Lal	Shiromani Akali Dal
13	Balluana	90	SC	Gurtej Singh	Shiromani Akali Dal
14	Banga	37	SC	Mohan Lal	Shiromani Akali Dal
15	Banur	70	GEN	Kanwaljit Singh	Shiromani Akali Dal
16	Barnala	83	GEN	Malkiat Singh	Independent
17	Batala	2	GEN	Jagdish	Bharatiya Janta Party
18	Beas	12	GEN	Manmohan Singh	Shiromani Akali Dal
19	Bhadaur	84	SC	Balbir Singh	Shiromani Akali Dal
20	Bhatinda	111	GEN	Chiranji Lal Garg	Shiromani Akali Dal
21	Bholath	40	GEN	Jagir Kaur	Shiromani Akali Dal
22	Budhlada	116	GEN	Hardev Singh	Communist Party Of India
23	Chamkaur Sahib	67	SC	Satwant Kaur	Shiromani Akali Dal
24	Dakala	73	GEN	Harmail Singh	Shiromani Akali Dal
25	Dakha	55	SC	Bikramjit Singh	Shiromani Akali Dal
26	Dasuya	51	GEN	Romesh Chander	Indian National Congress
27	Dhanaula	85	GEN	Gobind Singh	Shiromani Akali Dal
28	Dharamkot	98	SC	Sital Singh	Shiromani Akali Dal
29	Dhariwal	6	GEN	Sucha Singh Langah	Shiromani Akali Dal
30	Dhuri	80	GEN	Dhanwant Singh	Independent
31	Dina Nagar	8	SC	Roop Rani	Bharatiya Janta Party
32	Dirbha	87	GEN	Gurcharan Singh	Indian National Congress
33	Faridkot	104	GEN	Avtar Singh	Indian National Congress
34	Fatehgarh	1	GEN	Nirmal Singh	Independent
35	Fazilka	92	GEN	Surjit Kumar	Bharatiya Janta Party
36	Firozepur	95	GEN	Girdhara Singh	Bharatiya Janta Party
37	Firozepur Cantonment	96	GEN	Janmeja Singh	Shiromani Akali Dal
38	Garhdiwala	50	SC	Sohan Singh	Shiromani Akali Dal
39	Garhshankar	45	GEN	Shingara Ram Sahungra	Bahujan Samaj Party
40	Ghanaur	72	GEN	Ajaib Singh Mukhmail Pura	Shiromani Akali Dal
41	Giddar Baha	106	GEN	Manpreet Singh Badal	Shiromani Akali Dal
42	Gurdaspur	7	GEN	Kartar Singh Pahra	Shiromani Akali Dal
43	Guru Har Sahai	94	GEN	Paramjit Singh	Shiromani Akali Dal
44	Hoshiarpur	47	GEN	Tikhshan Sood	Bharatiya Janta Party
45	Jagraon	53	GEN	Bhag Singh	Shiromani Akali Dal
46	Jalalabad	93	GEN	Sher Singh	Shiromani Akali Dal
47	Jandiala	15	SC	Ajaypal Singh Mirankot	Shiromani Akali Dal
48	Joga	114	GEN	Baldev Singh	Shiromani Akali Dal
49	Jullundur Cantonment	29	GEN	Tej Parkash Singh	Indian National Congress
50	Jullundur Central	31	GEN	Manoranjan Kalia	Bharatiya Janta Party
51	Jullundur North	30	GEN	Avtar Henry	Indian National Congress
52	Jullundur South	32	SC	Chuni Lal	Bharatiya Janta Party
53	Kahnuwan	5	GEN	Sewa Singh Sekhwan	Shiromani Akali Dal
54	Kapurthala	41	GEN	Raghbir Singh	Shiromani Akali Dal
55	Kartarpur	33	SC	Jagjit Singh	Indian National Congress
56	Khadoor Sahib	24	SC	Ranjit Singh	Shiromani Akali Dal
57	Khanna	64	SC	Bachan Singh	Shiromani Akali Dal
58	Kharar	69	GEN	Daljeet Kaur	Shiromani Akali Dal
59	Kot Kapura	103	GEN	Mantar Singh	Independent
60	Kum Kalan	62	SC	Charanjit Singh	Shiromani Akali Dal
61	Lambi	108	GEN	Parkash Singh Badal	Shiromani Akali Dal
62	Lehra	89	GEN	Rajinder Kaur Bhattal	Indian National Congress
63	Lohian	34	GEN	Ajit Singh Kohar	Shiromani Akali Dal
64	Ludhiana East	59	GEN	Sat Pal Gosain	Bharatiya Janta Party
65	Ludhiana North	57	GEN	Rakesh Kumar	Indian National Congress
66	Ludhiana Rural	60	GEN	Hira Singh Gabbaria	Shiromani Akali Dal
67	Ludhiana West	58	GEN	Maheshinder Singh	Shiromani Akali Dal
68	Mahilpur	46	SC	Sohan Singh	Shiromani Akali Dal
69	Majitha	13	GEN	Parkash Singh	Shiromani Akali Dal
70	Malerkotla	81	GEN	Nusrat Ali Khan	Shiromani Akali Dal
71	Malout	107	SC	Sujan Singh	Shiromani Akali Dal
72	Mansa	115	GEN	Sukhvinder Singh	Shiromani Akali Dal
73	Moga	99	GEN	Tota Singh	Shiromani Akali Dal
74	Morinda	68	GEN	Ravi Inder Singh	Shiromani Akali Dal
75	Mukerian	52	GEN	Arunesh Kumar	Bharatiya Janta Party
76	Muktsar	105	GEN	Harnirpal Singh	Shiromani Akali Dal
77	Nabha	77	GEN	Narinder Singh	Shiromani Akali Dal
78	Nakodar	35	GEN	Amarjit Singh Samra	Indian National Congress
79	Nangal	65	GEN	Madan Mohan Mittal	Bharatiya Janta Party
80	Narot Mehra	9	SC	Ram Lal	Bharatiya Janta Party
81	Nathana	112	SC	Balbir Singh	Shiromani Akali Dal
82	Naushahra Panwan	25	GEN	Ranjit Singh	Shiromani Akali Dal
83	Nawan Shahr	38	GEN	Charanjit Singh	Independent
84	Nihal Singh Wala	101	SC	Ajaib Singh	Communist Party Of India
85	Nur Mahal	36	GEN	Gurdip Singh	Shiromani Akali Dal
86	Pakka Kalan	110	SC	Makhan Singh	Shiromani Akali Dal
87	Panjgrain	102	SC	Gurdev Singh Badal	Shiromani Akali Dal
88	Pathankot	10	GEN	Mohan Lal	Bharatiya Janta Party
89	Patiala Town	76	GEN	Surjit Singh Kohli	Shiromani Akali Dal
90	Patti	26	GEN	Adaish Partap Singh	Shiromani Akali Dal
91	Payal	61	GEN	Sadhu Singh	Shiromani Akali Dal
92	Phagwara	43	SC	Swarna Ram	Bharatiya Janta Party
93	Phillaur	39	SC	Sarwan Singh	Shiromani Akali Dal
94	Qadian	3	GEN	Natha Singh Dalam	Shiromani Akali Dal
95	Qila Raipur	56	GEN	Parkash Singh Badal	Shiromani Akali Dal
96	Raikot	54	GEN	Harmohinder Singh Pardhan	Indian National Congress
97	Raja Sansi	21	GEN	Vir Singh Lopoke	Shiromani Akali Dal
98	Rajpura	71	GEN	Balram Ji Dass	Bharatiya Janta Party
99	Rampura Phul	113	GEN	Sikandar Singh	Shiromani Akali Dal
100	Samana	75	GEN	Jagtar Singh Rajla	Shiromani Akali Dal
101	Samrala	63	GEN	Amrik Singh	Indian National Congress
102	Sangrur	86	GEN	Ranjit Singh	Shiromani Akali Dal
103	Sardulgarh	117	GEN	Ajit Inder Singh	Shiromani Akali Dal (SIMRANJIT SINGH MANN)
104	Sham Chaurasi	48	SC	Arjan Singh Josh	Shiromani Akali Dal
105	Sherpur	82	SC	Gobind Singh	Shiromani Akali Dal
106	Shutrana	74	SC	Gurdev Singh Sidhu	Shiromani Akali Dal
107	Sirhind	79	GEN	Harbans Lal	Indian National Congress
108	Srihargobindpur	4	GEN	Balbir Singh	Shiromani Akali Dal
109	Sujanpur	11	GEN	Satpal Saini	Bharatiya Janta Party
110	Sultanpur	42	GEN	Upinderjit Kaur	Shiromani Akali Dal
111	Sunam	88	GEN	Bhagwan Dass Arora	Indian National Congress
112	Talwandi Sabo	109	GEN	Harminder Singh Jassi	Indian National Congress
113	Tanda	49	GEN	Balvir Singh	Shiromani Akali Dal
114	Tarn Taran	23	GEN	Prem Singh Lalpur	Shiromani Akali Dal
115	Valtoha	27	GEN	Jagir Singh	Shiromani Akali Dal
116	Verka	14	SC	Ujagar Singh	Shiromani Akali Dal
117	Zira	97	GEN	Inderjit Singh	Shiromani Akali Dal
