= 1997 Punjab Legislative Assembly election =

State assembly election in India

1997 Punjab Legislative Assembly Election
- 7 February 1997

All 117 seats to the Vidhan Sabha 59 seats needed for a majority
- Turnout: 68.73% (▲44.91pp)
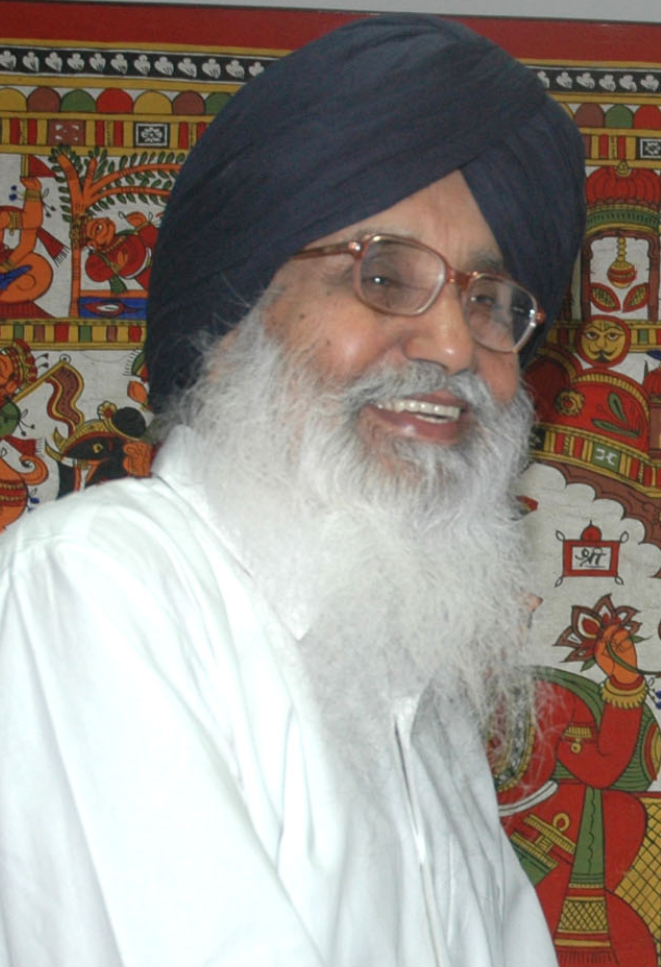

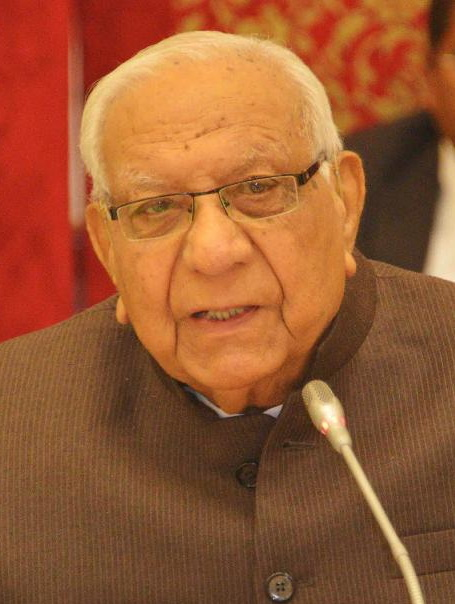

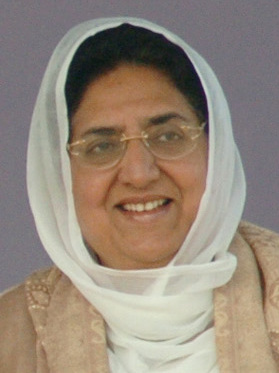
	First party	Second party	Third party
Leader	Parkash Singh Badal	Balram Das Tandon	Rajinder Kaur Bhattal
Party	SAD	BJP	INC
Alliance	SAD + BJP	SAD + BJP	INC + CPI
Leader since	1970	1995	1996
Leader's seat	Lambi & Qila Raipur (vacated)	Rajpura	Lehra
Last election	3	8	87
Seats won	75	18	14
Seat change	Boycotted last election	▲10	▼73
Popular vote	4,730,318	857,219	2,736,346
Percentage	45.97%	8.33%	26.38%
Swing	▲40.7%	▼8.15%	▼17.5%
Chief Minister before election
Rajinder Kaur Bhattal
INC
Elected Chief Minister
Parkash Singh Badal
SAD

1997 Punjab Legislative Assembly election was held in Indian state of Punjab in 1997, to elect 117 members to the 11th Punjab Legislative Assembly. Shiromani Akali Dal had majority of the seats in the 11th Punjab Assembly that was constituted after this election. Parkash Singh Badal was elected as the chief minister.

== Parties contested ==
Shiromani Akali Dal broke its alliance with BSP with whom they fought Lok sabha elections of 1996 and allianced with BJP; SAD - 94 BJP - 23

== Voter statistics ==
S.no.	Title	#
1.	Electors	1,52,25,395
2.	Votes polled	1,04,63,868
3.	Turnout	68.7%
4.	Total ACs	117
5.	General seats	88
6.	SC reserved constituencies	29

== Voter turnout ==
Voter turnout and total electors list

== Results ==
=== By alliance ===
S.no.	Alliance	Seats	Votes %	Contested voteshare
1.	Akali Dal Alliance	95	46.8	47.1
2.	Congress Alliance	16	29.3	30
3.	BSP Alliance	2	10.6	12.9
Total		113	86.7	90

=== By party ===
Summary of results of the Punjab Legislative Assembly election, 1997
Party	Candidates	Seats won	Votes	% of votes
Shiromani Akali Dal	92	75	38,73,099	37.64%
Bharatiya Janata Party	22	18	8,57,219	8.33%
Indian National Congress	105	14	27,36,346	26.38%
Communist Party of India	15	2	3,07,023	2.86%
Bahujan Samaj Party	67	1	7,69,675	6.37%
Shiromani Akali Dal (A)	30	1	3,19,111	3.10%
Independents	244	6	11,18,348	10.87%
Total	693	117	1,02,89,814	

=== Results by constituencies ===
Constituency		Winner				Runner Up				Margin	%
#	Name	Candidate	Party	Votes	%	Candidate	Party	Votes	%	Margin	%
1	Fatehgarh	Nirmal Singh	IND	43,195	52.66	Sukhjinder Singh	INC	37,659	45.91	5,536	6.75
2	Batala	Jagdish Sahni	BJP	49,843	56.10	Ashwani Sekhri	INC	35,986	40.50	13,857	15.60
3	Qadian	Natha Singh Dalam	SAD	43,424	46.84	Tripat Rajinder Singh	INC	37,761	40.74	5,663	6.10
4	Sri Hargobindpur	Balbir Singh	SAD	40,934	58.28	Gurnam Singh	CPI	15,945	22.70	24,989	35.58
5	Kahnuwan	Sewa Singh Sekhwan	SAD	42,674	53.25	Partap Singh Bajwa	INC	35,919	44.82	6,755	8.43
6	Dhariwal	Sucha Singh Langah	SAD	39,549	47.14	Sucha Singh Chhotepur	SAD(A)	35,070	41.80	4,479	5.34
7	Gurdaspur	Kartar Singh Pahra	SAD	42,337	48.57	Khushhal Bahl	INC	25,230	28.95	17,107	19.62
8	Dina Nagar (SC)	Roop Rani	BJP	47,723	63.97	Krishan Kumar	INC	19,905	26.68	27,818	37.29
9	Narot Mehra (SC)	Ram Lal	BJP	35,384	51.17	Kishan Chand	INC	14,132	20.44	21,252	30.73
10	Pathankot	Mohan Lal	BJP	46,365	56.61	Raman Kumar Bhalla	INC	31,649	38.64	14,716	17.97
11	Sujanpur	Satpal Saini	BJP	36,775	43.55	Raghunath Sahai Puri	INC	26,741	31.67	10,034	11.88
12	Beas	Manmohan Singh	SAD	43,588	48.39	Jasbir Singh	INC	41,761	46.37	1,827	2.02
13	Majitha	Parkash Singh Majitha	SAD	34,026	39.29	Sawinder Singh	IND	31,195	36.02	2,831	3.27
14	Verka (SC)	Ujagar Singh	SAD	52,554	57.05	Gurmej Singh	INC	21,109	22.91	31,445	34.14
15	Jandiala (SC)	Ajaypal Singh Mirankot	SAD	51,377	56.46	Sardool Singh	INC	31,617	34.74	19,760	21.72
16	Amritsar North	Baldev Raj Chawla	BJP	35,661	60.10	Faqir Chand Sharma	INC	18,929	31.90	16,732	28.20
17	Amritsar West	Om Parkash Soni	IND	42,305	40.10	Om Parkash Kalia	BJP	28,634	27.14	13,671	12.96
18	Amritsar Central	Laxmi Kanta Chawla	BJP	27,070	53.88	Darbari Lal	INC	12,487	24.85	14,583	29.03
19	Amritsar South	Manjit Singh Calcutta	SAD	31,060	40.62	Harjinder Singh Thekedar	INC	16,565	21.66	14,495	18.96
20	Ajnala	Rattan Singh Ajnala	SAD	50,705	50.49	Rajbir Singh	INC	48,994	48.79	1,711	1.70
21	Raja Sansi	Vir Singh Lopoke	SAD	52,182	62.34	Sukhbinder Sarkaria	INC	31,527	37.66	20,655	24.68
22	Attari (SC)	Gulzar Ranike	SAD	52,134	75.58	Sardul Singh	CPI	10,956	15.88	41,178	59.70
23	Tarn Taran	Prem Singh Lalpur	SAD	45,121	59.50	Dalbagh Singh Daleke	INC	19,902	26.25	25,219	33.25
24	Khadoor Sahib (SC)	Ranjit Singh	SAD	45,292	61.95	Lakha Singh	INC	12,002	16.42	33,290	45.53
25	Naushahra Panwan	Ranjit Singh	SAD	48,339	71.52	Jagir Singh	INC	16,743	24.77	31,596	46.75
26	Patti	Adesh Partap Singh	SAD	60,721	71.46	Sukhwinder Singh	INC	13,234	15.57	47,487	55.89
27	Valtoha	Jagir Singh	SAD	37,733	47.67	Gurchet Singh	INC	36,579	46.21	1,154	1.46
28	Adampur	Saroop Singh	SAD	40,578	48.76	Kanwaljit Singh Lally	INC	24,274	29.17	16,304	19.59
29	Jalandhar Cantt.	Tej Parkash Singh	INC	32,426	42.63	Surjit Singh Minhas	SAD	28,766	37.82	3,660	4.81
30	Jalandhar North	Avtar Henry	INC	33,893	45.91	Naval Kishore	BJP	31,723	42.97	2,170	2.94
31	Jalandhar Central	Manoranjan Kalia	BJP	43,041	60.59	Jai Kishan Saini	INC	23,671	33.32	19,370	27.27
32	Jalandhar South (SC)	Chuni Lal	BJP	32,708	38.51	Mohinder Singh Kaypee	INC	26,574	31.29	6,134	7.22
33	Kartarpur (SC)	Jagjit Singh	INC	29,596	35.85	Ram Lal Jassi	IND	29,320	35.52	276	0.33
34	Lohian	Ajit Singh Kohar	SAD	59,341	60.16	Darshan Singh	INC	32,181	32.62	27,160	27.54
35	Nakodar	Amarjit Singh Samra	INC	33,729	37.92	Gurbachan Singh Dhiman	BSP	22,881	25.72	10,848	12.20
36	Nur Mahal	Gurdip Singh	SAD	27,600	30.14	Gurwinder Singh	IND	27,152	29.65	448	0.49
37	Banga (SC)	Mohan Lal	SAD	27,757	34.74	Satnam Singh Kainth	BSP	27,148	33.98	609	0.76
38	Nawan Shahr	Charanjit Singh	IND	35,933	34.84	Jatinder Singh	SAD	33,943	32.91	1,990	1.93
39	Phillaur (SC)	Sarwan Singh Phillaur	SAD	31,045	35.49	Santokh Chaudhary	INC	25,493	29.15	5,552	6.34
40	Bholath	Jagir Kaur	SAD	53,168	66.92	Sukhpal Khaira	INC	25,141	31.64	28,027	35.28
41	Kapurthala	Raghbir Singh	SAD	32,405	46.52	Gulzar Singh	INC	20,150	28.93	12,255	17.59
42	Sultanpur	Upinderjit Kaur	SAD	47,455	59.81	Rajanbir Singh	INC	25,529	32.17	21,926	27.64
43	Phagwara (SC)	Swarna Ram	BJP	50,176	52.67	Joginder Singh Mann	INC	23,553	24.72	26,623	27.95
44	Balachaur	Nand Lal	SAD	42,403	52.98	Hargopal Singh	BSP	21,881	27.34	20,522	25.64
45	Garhshankar	Shingara Ram Sahungra	BSP	21,291	27.79	Avinash	BJP	20,490	26.75	801	1.04
46	Mahilpur (SC)	Sohan Singh	SAD	29,400	44.53	Avtar Singh Karimpuri	BSP	20,667	31.30	8,733	13.23
47	Hoshiarpur	Tikshan Sud	BJP	39,444	49.37	Mohinder Pal	BSP	17,329	21.69	22,115	27.68
48	Sham Chaurasi (SC)	Arjan Singh Josh	SAD	32,738	44.52	Gurpal Chand	BSP	19,243	26.17	13,495	18.35
49	Tanda	Balvir Singh	SAD	41,745	53.29	Surjit Kaur	INC	21,359	27.27	20,386	26.02
50	Garhdiwala (SC)	Sohan Singh	SAD	36,826	51.25	Dharampal Sabharwal	INC	18,310	25.48	18,516	25.77
51	Dasuya	Romesh Chander	INC	31,754	39.25	Mahant Ram Parkash	BJP	31,701	39.19	53	0.06
52	Mukerian	Arunesh Kumar	BJP	53,594	54.41	Kewal Krishan	INC	34,102	34.62	19,492	19.79
53	Jagraon	Bhag Singh	SAD	46,034	48.40	Darshan Singh	INC	27,080	28.47	18,954	19.93
54	Raikot	Harmohinder Pardhan	INC	38,297	42.66	Ranjit Singh Talwandi	SAD	34,245	38.14	4,052	4.52
55	Dakha (SC)	Bikramjit Singh	SAD	64,605	51.93	Malkit Singh Dakha	INC	49,495	39.78	15,110	12.15
56	Qila Raipur	Parkash Singh Badal	SAD	38,532	44.74	Tarsem Jodhan	CPI(M)	27,500	31.93	11,032	12.81
57	Ludhiana North	Rakesh Kumar	INC	33,614	52.57	Krishan Lal	IND	12,752	19.94	20,862	32.63
58	Ludhiana West	Maheshinder Singh	SAD	41,725	55.17	Harnam Das Johar	INC	28,832	38.12	12,893	17.05
59	Ludhiana East	Sat Pal Gosain	BJP	36,338	58.87	Om Parkash Gupta	INC	20,027	32.44	16,311	26.43
60	Ludhiana Rural	Hira Singh Gabbaria	SAD	93,924	58.15	Jagdev Singh	IND	32,897	20.37	61,027	37.78
61	Payal	Sadhu Singh	SAD	42,459	49.41	Kartar Singh	CPI	35,185	40.94	7,274	8.47
62	Kum Kalan (SC)	Charanjit Singh	SAD	45,616	50.25	Ishar Singh	INC	32,193	35.46	13,423	14.79
63	Samrala	Amrik Singh	INC	37,078	45.94	Kirpal Singh	SAD	35,659	44.18	1,419	1.76
64	Khanna (SC)	Bachan Singh	SAD	45,089	51.97	Shamsher Singh	INC	32,340	37.27	12,749	14.70
65	Nangal	Madan Mohan Mittal	BJP	29,867	40.29	Mohinder Paul	CPI(M)	20,596	27.79	9,271	12.50
66	Anandpur Sahib-Ropar	Tara Singh	SAD	37,878	47.19	Ramesh Dutt Sharma	INC	31,834	39.66	6,044	7.53
67	Chamkaur Sahib (SC)	Satwant Kaur	SAD	40,349	57.97	Bhag Singh	SAD(A)	14,205	20.41	26,144	37.56
68	Morinda	Ravi Inder Singh	SAD	37,986	41.41	Jagmohan Singh	INC	33,151	36.14	4,835	5.27
69	Kharar	Daljeet Kaur	SAD	56,399	57.48	Mann Singh	BSP	21,643	22.06	34,756	35.42
70	Banur	Kanwaljit Singh	SAD	44,972	49.46	Mohinder Singh Gill	INC	22,374	24.61	22,598	24.85
71	Rajpura	Balram Ji Dass	BJP	38,543	42.00	Raj Khurana	INC	37,452	40.82	1,091	1.18
72	Ghanaur	Ajaib Singh Mukhmail Pura	SAD	42,150	48.13	Jasjit Singh Randhawa	INC	34,326	39.19	7,824	8.94
73	Dakala	Harmail Singh	SAD	41,062	39.62	Lal Singh	INC	31,159	30.06	9,903	9.56
74	Shutrana (SC)	Gurdev Singh Sidhu	SAD	45,592	48.13	Ram Chand	CPI	29,419	31.05	16,173	17.08
75	Samana	Jagtar Singh Rajla	SAD	65,154	57.94	Brij Lal	INC	24,858	22.10	40,296	35.84
76	Patiala Town	Surjit Singh Kohli	SAD	41,430	52.81	Brahm Mohindra	INC	28,766	36.66	12,664	16.15
77	Nabha	Narinder Singh	SAD	37,459	35.11	Randeep Singh	IND	36,165	33.90	1,294	1.21
78	Amloh (SC)	Balwant Singh	SAD	44,204	44.53	Sadhu Singh	INC	31,472	31.70	12,732	12.83
79	Sirhind	Harbans Lal	INC	29,983	31.71	Kirpal Singh Libra	SAD	24,744	26.17	5,239	5.54
80	Dhuri	Dhanwant Singh	IND	28,988	31.26	Surinder Singh	SAD	25,297	27.28	3,691	3.98
81	Malerkotla	Nusrat Ali Khan	SAD	44,305	41.61	Ajit Singh	IND	25,285	23.75	19,020	17.86
82	Sherpur (SC)	Gobind Singh	SAD	31,149	34.95	Raj Singh	BSP	27,947	31.36	3,202	3.59
83	Barnala	Malkiat Singh	IND	41,819	42.62	Rajinder Kaur	SAD	18,105	18.45	23,714	24.17
84	Bhadaur (SC)	Balbir Singh	SAD	33,207	39.53	Mohinder Pal Singh	INC	21,680	25.81	11,527	13.72
85	Dhanaula	Gobind Singh	SAD	33,748	36.89	Manjit Singh	INC	30,666	33.52	3,082	3.37
86	Sangrur	Ranjit Singh	SAD	43,971	44.13	Surinder Pal Singh	INC	41,615	41.76	2,356	2.37
87	Dirbha	Gurcharan Singh	INC	36,549	38.95	Baldev Singh	SAD	30,186	32.17	6,363	6.78
88	Sunam	Bhagwan Dass Arora	INC	42,413	41.06	Sukhdev Singh Dhindsa	SAD	39,907	38.64	2,506	2.42
89	Lehra	Rajinder Kaur Bhattal	INC	51,769	53.62	Garja Singh Khandebad	SAD	41,039	42.51	10,730	11.11
90	Balluana (SC)	Gurtej Singh	SAD	44,835	55.18	Babu Ram	INC	22,804	28.06	22,031	27.12
91	Abohar	Ram Kumar	BJP	55,329	56.01	Sajjan Kumar	INC	39,767	40.26	15,562	15.75
92	Fazilka	Surjit Kumar	BJP	41,790	45.48	Mohinder Kumar	IND	29,669	32.29	12,121	13.19
93	Jalalabad	Sher Singh	SAD	42,844	37.16	Hans Raj	IND	39,447	34.21	3,397	2.95
94	Guru Har Sahai	Paramjit Singh	SAD	31,704	29.13	Sajwar Singh	INC	23,096	21.22	8,608	7.91
95	Firozepur	Girdhara Singh	BJP	45,020	53.39	Mukhtiar Singh	BSP	21,151	25.08	23,869	28.31
96	Firozepur Cantt.	Janmeja Singh	SAD	38,281	44.10	Ravinder Singh	INC	36,551	42.11	1,730	1.99
97	Zira	Inderjit Singh	SAD	59,635	59.42	Naresh Kumar	INC	40,037	39.89	19,598	19.53
98	Dharamkot (SC)	Sital Singh	SAD	57,400	64.79	Kewal Singh	INC	30,758	34.72	26,642	30.07
99	Moga	Tota Singh	SAD	41,616	47.42	Sathi Vijay Kumar	JD	20,217	23.04	21,399	24.38
100	Bagha Purana	Sadhu Singh	SAD	45,869	48.43	Maheshinder Singh	INC	41,496	43.81	4,373	4.62
101	Nihal Singh Wala (SC)	Ajaib Singh	CPI	39,842	47.29	Zora Singh	SAD	38,051	45.16	1,791	2.13
102	Panjgrain (SC)	Gurdev Singh Badal	SAD	44,265	50.19	Gurcharan Singh	INC	35,905	40.71	8,360	9.48
103	Kot Kapura	Mantar Singh	IND	50,562	48.56	Mohinder Singh	SAD	34,933	33.55	15,629	15.01
104	Faridkot	Avtar Singh	INC	55,857	50.99	Jagdish Kaur	SAD	52,334	47.77	3,523	3.22
105	Muktsar	Harnirpal Singh	SAD	52,166	56.66	Avtar Singh	IND	39,398	42.79	12,768	13.87
106	Giddar Baha	Manpreet Singh Badal	SAD	51,086	53.02	Malkit Singh	INC	33,938	35.22	17,148	17.80
107	Malout (SC)	Sujan Singh	SAD	39,583	48.51	Nathu Ram	CPI	22,617	27.72	16,966	20.79
108	Lambi	Parkash Singh Badal	SAD	52,963	57.32	Gurnam Abulkhurana	INC	24,235	26.23	28,728	31.09
109	Talwandi Sabo	Harminder Singh Jassi	INC	36,483	39.93	Jeet Mohinder Singh	SAD	33,290	36.44	3,193	3.49
110	Pakka Kalan (SC)	Makhan Singh	SAD	39,873	49.82	Rameshwer Dass	INC	28,844	36.04	11,029	13.78
111	Bathinda	Chiranji Lal Garg	SAD	55,736	50.84	Surinder Kapoor	INC	31,355	28.60	24,381	22.24
112	Nathana (SC)	Balbir Singh	SAD	41,957	48.97	Gulzar Singh	INC	25,053	29.24	16,904	19.73
113	Rampura Phul	Sikandar Singh	SAD	36,187	38.34	Harbans Singh	INC	26,703	28.29	9,484	10.05
114	Joga	Baldev Singh	SAD	30,928	34.04	Sukhdev Singh Dhillon	IND	27,309	30.06	3,619	3.98
115	Mansa	Sukhvinder Singh	SAD	36,013	38.27	Boota Singh	CPI	34,227	36.37	1,786	1.90
116	Budhlada	Hardev Singh	CPI	47,469	49.31	Harbant Singh	SAD	41,020	42.62	6,449	6.69
117	Sardulgarh	Ajit Inder Singh	SAD(A)	45,152	46.14	Balwinder Singh	SAD	42,035	42.95	3,117	3.19

== Government formation ==
Shiromani Akali Dal had majority of the seats in the 11th Punjab Assembly that was constituted after this election. Parkash Singh Badal was elected as the Chief Minister.

== Bye elections 1997-2002 ==
#	AC name	No	Type	Winning candidate	Party	Electors	Votes	Turnout	Reason
1	Ludhiana North	57	GEN	Rakesh Pandey	INC	1,39,156	51,187	NA	NA
2	Majitha	13	GEN	Raj Mohinder Singh	SAD	1,23,829	87,764	70.9 %	Death of Shri Sardar Parkash Singh Majitha
3	Raipur	56	GEN	Jagdish Singh Garcha	SAD	1,22,399	90,129	73.6 %	NA
4	Shamchurasi	48	SC	Mohinder Kaur	SAD	1,18,915	63,639	53.5 %	NA
5	Sunam	88	GEN	Parminder Singh	SAD	1,39,301	97,497	70 %	NA

== See also ==
Elections in Punjab, India
