= Raman Arora =

Indian politician

MLA, Punjab Legislative Assembly
- Incumbent
- Assumed office 2022
- Constituency: Jalandhar Central
- Majority: Aam Aadmi Party

Personal details
- Party: Aam Aadmi Party

Raman Arora is an Indian politician and the MLA representing the Jalandhar Central Assembly constituency in the Punjab Legislative Assembly. He is a member of the Aam Aadmi Party.

== Member of Legislative Assembly ==
He represents the Jalandhar Central Assembly constituency as MLA in Punjab Assembly.The Aam Aadmi Party gained a strong 79% majority in the sixteenth Punjab Legislative Assembly by winning 92 out of 117 seats in the 2022 Punjab Legislative Assembly election. MP Bhagwant Mann was sworn in as Chief Minister on 16 March 2022.

Committee assignments of Punjab Legislative Assembly

- Member (2022–23) Committee on Estimates
- Member (2022–23) Committee on Subordinate Legislation

== Corruption and extortion charges ==
Punjab’s Vigilance Bureau (VB) arrested Raman Arora, from Jalandhar Central, following a raid at his residence in Jalandhar. The arrest was linked to allegations of issuing bogus municipal notices and participating in an extortion racket in collusion with municipal officials. Arora's aide, Assistant Town Planner (ATP) Sukhdev Vashisht, was arrested earlier and accused of issuing fake violation notices and demanding bribes. This arrest triggered suspicion and scrutiny of Arora’s involvement.

Arora was initially remanded to 5-day VB custody, later extended by 4 more days, as investigators dug deeper into the alleged corruption network. During raids, officials seized fake municipal notices, ₹6 lakh cash, 1.2 kg of gold jewelry, and significant documentation. Arora’s aide Mahesh Makhija, building inspector Harpreet Kaur, and others were also arrested. A comprehensive 900-page chargesheet was subsequently filed in court, naming Arora and multiple associates, including Vashisht and Makhija, as accused.

On 4 September 2025, the Punjab and Haryana High Court granted bail to Raman Arora in the original corruption case. However, immediately after his release, Arora was re-arrested under a new extortion FIR registered on 23 August, based on a complaint by a parking contractor named Ramesh. Arora was allegedly forcing the contractor to pay money to continue operating his business.

== Electoral Performance ==
2022 Punjab Legislative Assembly election: Jalandhar Central
Party	Candidate	Votes	%	±%
AAP	Raman Arora	33,011	31.30	▲16.9
INC	Rajinder Beri	32,764	31.0	▼21.2
BJP	Manoranjan Kalia	27,993	26.50	▼3.1
SAD	Chandan Kumar Grewal	10,907	10.30	New
NOTA	None of the Above	953	0.5	New
Majority		247	0.23	
Turnout		106,554	61.1	
Registered electors		174,285		
AAP gain from INC				

State Legislative Assembly
Preceded by -	Member of the Punjab Legislative Assembly from Jalandhar Central Assembly constituency 2022 –	Incumbent
