= Sukhwinder Singh Aulakh =

Indian politician

Member of Punjab Legislative Assembly
- In office 1997–2002
- Preceded by: Sher Singh Gagowal
- Succeeded by: Sher Singh Gagowal
- Constituency: Mansa

Personal details
- Born: Punjab, India
- Party: Akali Dal (Waris Punjab De)
- Other political affiliations: Shiromani Akali Dal (Punar Surjit); Shiromani Akali Dal

Sukhwinder Singh Aulakh is an Indian politician of Akali Dal Waris Punjab De, and former Member of the Legislative Assembly for Mansa.

== Political career ==
Aulakh's entrance into politics was marked by his election as MLA from Mansa in 1997 as a candidate of Shiromani Akali Dal. He contested from this constituency again in 2002 but was defeated by Sher Singh Gagowal. Shiromani Akali Dal declared Aulakh as its candidate for Mansa in 2007, but he was unsuccessful again. He was an organizational secretary of Shiromani Akali Dal (Punar Surjit) faction. Aulakh was inducted into Akali Dal (Waris Punjab De) in August 2026 by MLA Manpreet Singh Ayali and Tarsem Singh, father of MP Amritpal Singh.

== Electoral performance ==
1997 Punjab Legislative Assembly election: Mansa
Party	Candidate	Votes	%	±%
SAD	Sukhwinder Singh Aulakh			
INC				
Majority		1,786	1.9	
Turnout		95,613	70.2	
Registered electors		1,36,293		
SAD gain from INC				

Punjab Assembly election, 2002: Mansa
Party	Candidate	Votes	%	±%
Independent	Sher Singh Gagowal			
SAD	Sukhwinder Singh Aulakh			
INC				
Majority				
Turnout				
Registered electors				
Independent gain from SAD		Swing		

Punjab Assembly election, 2007: Mansa
Party	Candidate	Votes	%	±%
INC	Sher Singh Gagowal			
SAD	Sukhwinder Singh Aulakh			
Majority				
Turnout				
Registered electors				
INC gain from Independent		Swing		
