= Jaswinder Singh Ramdas =

Indian politician

MLA, Punjab
- Incumbent
- Assumed office 2022
- Constituency: Attari

Personal details
- Party: Aam Aadmi Party

Jaswinder Singh is an Indian politician and the MLA from Attari Assembly constituency. He is a member of the Aam Aadmi Party.

== Member of Legislative Assembly ==
He represents the Attari Assembly constituency as MLA in Punjab Assembly. The Aam Aadmi Party gained a strong 79% majority in the sixteenth Punjab Legislative Assembly by winning 92 out of 117 seats in the 2022 Punjab Legislative Assembly election. MP Bhagwant Mann was sworn in as Chief Minister on 16 March 2022.

Committee assignments of Punjab Legislative Assembly

- Member (2022–23) Committee on Welfare of Scheduled Castes, Scheduled Tribes and Backward Classes
- Member (2022–23) Committee on Panchayati Raj Institutions

== Assets and liabilities declared during elections ==
During the 2022 Punjab Legislative Assembly election, he declared Rs. 2,12,34,159 as an overall financial asset and Rs. 4,83,914 as financial liability.

== Electoral performance ==
2022 Punjab Legislative Assembly election: Attari
Party	Candidate	Votes	%	±%
AAP	Jaswinder Singh	56,798	44.32	
SAD	Gulzar Singh Ranike	37,004	28.88	
INC	Tarsem Singh Sialka	26,204	20.45	
BJP	Balwinder Kaur	2,548	1.99	
NOTA	None of the above	1,381	1.08	
IND	3 Independent Candidates	2,448	1.91	
OTH	6 Other Party Candidates	1,762	1.38	
Majority		19,794	15.44	
Turnout		128,145	67.25	
AAP gain from INC		Swing		

State Legislative Assembly
Preceded by -	Member of the Punjab Legislative Assembly from Attari Assembly constituency 2022 –	Incumbent
