= Gurinder Singh Garry Birring =

Indian politician

Member of the Punjab Legislative Assembly
- Incumbent
- Assumed office 2022
- Preceded by: Randeep Singh Nabha
- Constituency: Amloh
- Majority: 24,663

Personal details
- Born: Mandi Gobindgarh
- Citizenship: India
- Party: Aam Aadmi Party
- Education: Masters in Business Administration
- Alma mater: University of Oxford

Gurinder Singh Garry Birring is an Indian Politician and a member of Punjab Legislative Assembly representing Amloh Assembly constituency since 2022. He is a member of the Aam Aadmi Party.

== Member of Legislative Assembly ==
He represents the Amloh Assembly constituency as MLA in Punjab Assembly. The Aam Aadmi Party gained a strong 79% majority in the sixteenth Punjab Legislative Assembly by winning 92 out of 117 seats in the 2022 Punjab Legislative Assembly election. MP Bhagwant Mann was sworn in as Chief Minister on 16 March 2022.

Committee assignments of Punjab Legislative Assembly

- Member (2022–23) Committee on Public Accounts

== Electoral performance ==
Punjab Assembly election, 2022: Amloh
| Party | Candidate | Votes | % | ±% |
|---|---|---|---|---|
| AAP | Gurinder Singh Garry | 52,912 | 46.43 | |
| SAD | Gurpreet Singh Raju Khanna | 28,249 | 24.79 | |
| INC | Randeep Singh Nabha | 16,077 | 14.11 | |
| BJP | Kanwarveer Singh Tohra | 9,488 | 8.33 | New |
| SAD(A) | Lakhveer Singh Sounti | 3,793 | 3.33 | |
| Independent | Darshan Singh Babbi | 1,243 | 1.09 | |
| NOTA | None of the above | 523 | 0.46 | |
| Majority | | 24,663 | 21.64 | |
| Turnout | | | | |
| Registered electors | | 144,482 | | |
| AAP gain from INC | | Swing | | |

State Legislative Assembly
| Preceded by Randeep Singh Nabha (INC) | Member of the Punjab Legislative Assembly from Amloh Assembly constituency 2022 – | Incumbent |
