= Ralla, Punjab =

Ralla Joga Ralla
- Village
- Location in Punjab, India Ralla (India)
- Coordinates: 30.120°N 75.432°E
- Country: India
- State: Punjab
- District: Mansa

Government
  - Body: Gram panchayat

Languages
  - Official: Punjabi
  - Regional: Punjabi
- Time zone: UTC+5:30 (IST)
- Postal code: 148109
- Vehicle registration: PB-31
- Nearest city: Mansa

Ralla is a village in Mansa district of Punjab, India. There is another village known as Joga nearby (5.5 km) and they are often referred to together as Joga Ralla.

== Geography ==
Ralla is located at coordinates 30°07′12″N 75°25′55″E. It lies on the Barnala–Mansa–Sirsa State Highway 13, at 16 km from Mansa and 33 km from Barnala. The total geographical area of the village is 2,845 hectares (7,112.5 acres or 28.78 km²). The nearest town is Mansa, approximately 8 km away. Surrounding villages include Aklia, Burj Rathi, Chauke, Joga, Makha Chehlan, Samaon, Tamkot, Ubha, and Bhupal.

== Demographics ==
According to the 2011 Census, Ralla has a total population of 7,832, comprising 4,115 males and 3,717 females, across 1,546 households. Children in the 0–6 age group number 876, making up 11.18% of the total population. The sex ratio is 903 females per 1,000 males, higher than the Punjab state average of 895. The child sex ratio is 900, which is also above the Punjab state average of 846. The literacy rate of the village is 58.90%, compared to the Punjab state average of 75.84%. Male literacy stands at 61.93% while female literacy is 55.54%. Scheduled Caste (SC) population constitutes 22.60% of the total population, numbering 1,770 residents (917 males and 853 females). There is no Scheduled Tribe (ST) population in the village. Of the total population, 2,977 residents are engaged in work activities. Of these, 75.75% are classified as main workers (employed for more than 6 months a year) and 24.25% as marginal workers. Among main workers, 1,052 are cultivators (owner or co-owner) and 589 are agricultural labourers. All residents speak Punjabi as their mother tongue, which is also the official language of the state.

== Administration ==
Ralla is governed by a Gram Panchayat under the Panchayati Raj system, with an elected Sarpanch serving as the head of the village. The village falls under the Mansa Assembly Constituency and the Bathinda Parliamentary Constituency.

== Religion and Culture ==
Sikhism is the predominant religion in Ralla. The village has two Gurdwara Sahibs located in the main village area. On the outskirts of the village lies the Baba Jogi Peer Singh Chahal temple, where two annual fairs (melas) are organised each year, drawing visitors from surrounding areas. The Chahal surname is the most common family name among residents of the village.

== Education ==
The village has two government high schools — one for boys and one for girls.

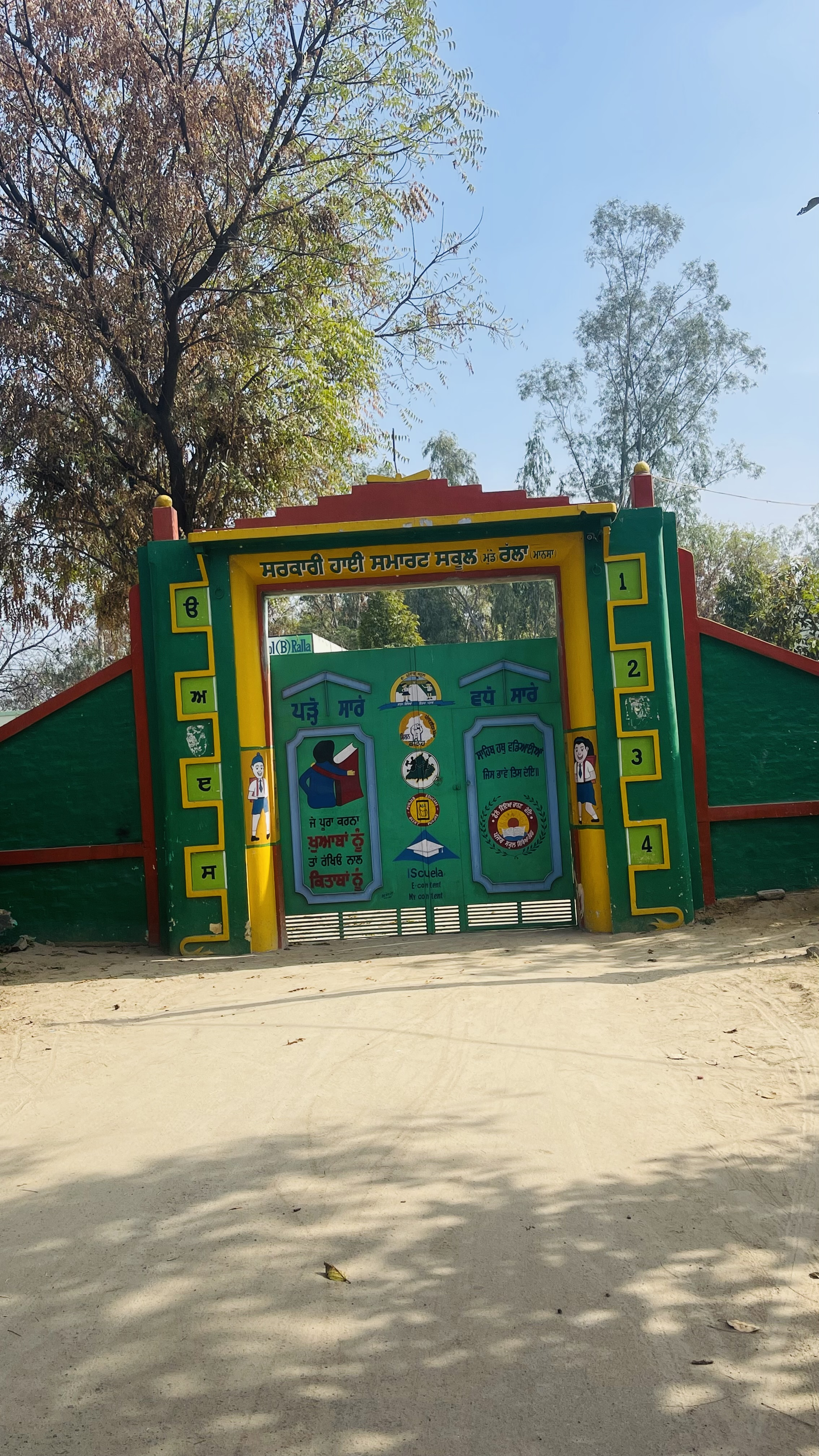
Gate of Government High Smart School, Ralla village, Mansa district, Punjab, India

== Infrastructure ==
Ralla has its own post office. The village also has a micro-hydel power plant with a capacity of 0.3 megawatt, which is currently non-operational.
