= Raj Kumar Gupta (disambiguation) =

Raj Kumar Gupta (born 1977) is an Indian film writer and director in Hindi cinema.

Raj Kumar Gupta may also refer to:

- Raj Kumar Gupta (Indian politician)
- Raj Kumar Gupta (Nepalese politician)

== See also ==
- Raj Gupta (disambiguation)
