= Sunder Sham Arora =

Indian politician from Punjab

Punjab Legislative Assembly
- In office 2017–2022
- Succeeded by: Tikshan Sud
- Constituency: Hoshiarpur

Personal details
- Born: 15 June 1958 (age 67)
- Party: Indian National Congress
- Profession: Politician

Sunder Sham Arora (born 15 June 1958) is an Indian politician and a member of Indian National Congress (INC). In 2017, he was elected as the member of the Punjab Legislative Assembly from Hoshiarpur constituency from 2017 to 2022. He was arrested by vigilance allegedly for corruption cases, however the Punjab and Haryana High Court quashed the FIR against him, criticizing the Vigilance Bureau for misusing its authority.

== Early life and education ==
Sunder Sham Arora was born on 15 June 1958.

== Political career ==
Arora began his political career with the Indian National Congress. He contested the 2017 Punjab Legislative Assembly elections as an INC candidate from the Hoshiarpur constituency. In that election, he defeated Tikshan Sud of the Bharatiya Janata Party (BJP) by a margin of 11,233 votes, marking a significant win for the Congress in the region.

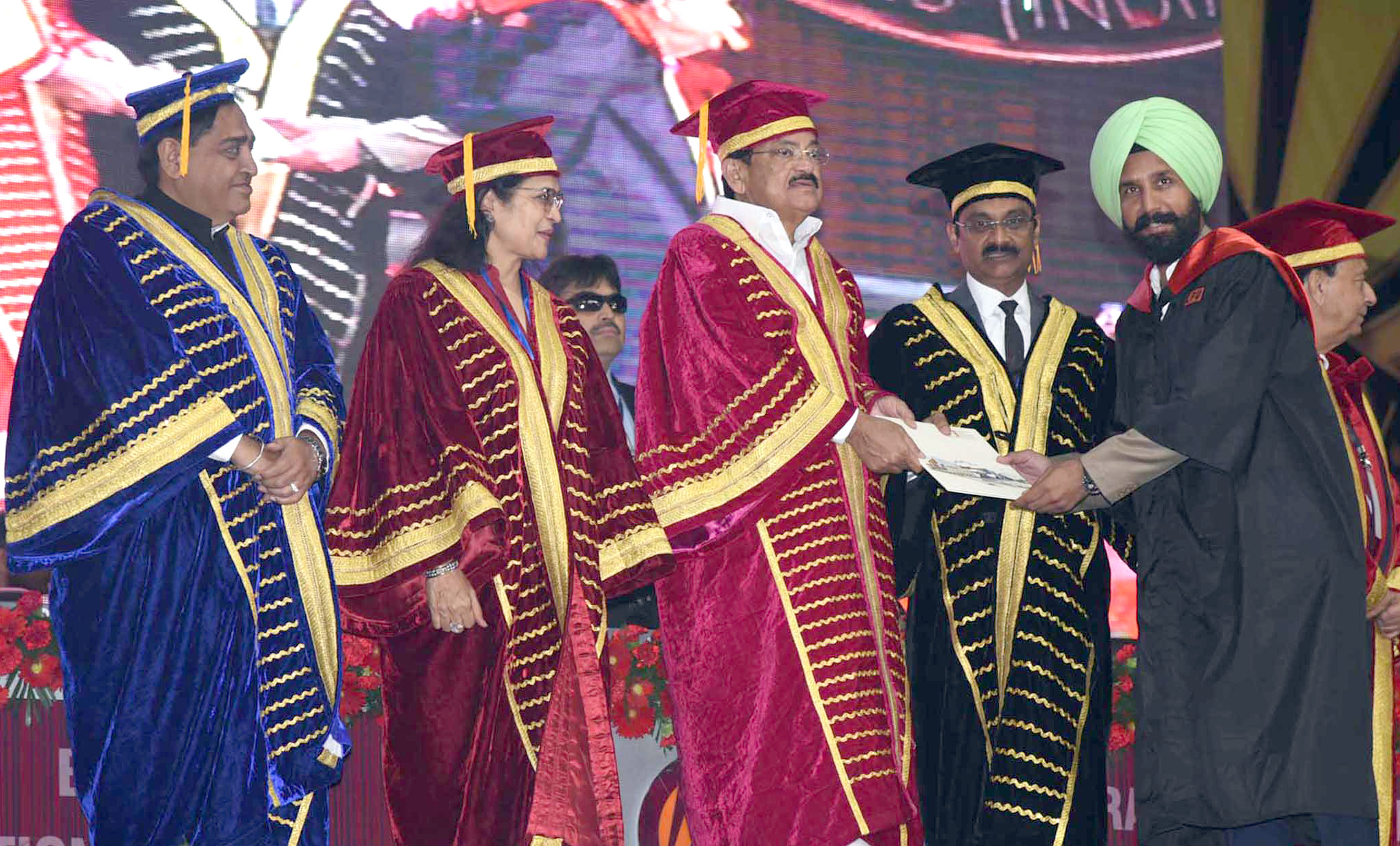
The Vice President, Shri M. Venkaiah Naidu presenting degrees & certificates to the students and researchers, at the 9th Convocation of Lovely Professional University, at Phagwara, Punjab on October 22, 2018. The Minister for Industry and Commerce, Punjab, Shri Sunder Sham Arora and other dignitaries are also seen.

During his tenure as an MLA, Arora was involved in legislative activities and was part of the state government led by the INC.

== Allegations and controversies ==
In October 2022, Sunder Sham Arora was arrested by the Punjab Vigilance Bureau for allegedly attempting to bribe officials in relation to ongoing corruption investigations against him. His arrest drew widespread media attention and was part of political vendetta.

However, in January 2025, the Punjab and Haryana High Court quashed the FIR against him, criticizing the Vigilance Bureau for misusing its authority and failing to follow due legal process. This marked a major legal relief for Arora, casting doubt on the credibility of the initial allegations.
