= Panjgrain Assembly constituency =

Former Legislative Assembly constituency in Punjab, India

Coordinates: 31.16°N 75.56°E

Panjgrain
- Former constituency No. 102 for the Punjab Legislative Assembly

Constituency details
- Country: India
- State: Punjab
- District: Faridkot
- Lok Sabha constituency: Faridkot
- Established: 1977
- Abolished: 2012
- Total electors: 131,298 (2007)
- Reservation: SC

Panjgrain was one of the 117 assembly constituencies of Punjab, an Indian state lying in Faridkot district. Panjgrain was also part of Faridkot Lok Sabha constituency.

== Members of the Legislative Assembly ==
Election	Winner	Party
1977	Gurdev Singh Badal	Shiromani Akali Dal
1980	Gurdev Singh Badal	Shiromani Akali Dal
1985	Gurdev Singh Badal	Shiromani Akali Dal
1992	Gurcharan Singh Tohra	Indian National Congress
1997	Gurdev Singh Badal	Shiromani Akali Dal
2002	Gurdev Singh Badal	Shiromani Akali Dal
2007	Joginder Singh	Indian National Congress

== Election results ==
=== 2007 ===
2007 Punjab Legislative Assembly election: Panjgrain
Party	Candidate	Votes	%	±%
INC	Joginder Singh			
Majority				
Turnout				
INC gain from SAD		Swing		

== See also ==
- Panjgrain
- Jalandhar district
- Jalandhar (Lok Sabha constituency)
