= Rajiv Gupta =

Rajiv Gupta may refer to:

- Rajiv Gupta (judge), former Chief Justice of Kerala, Uttarakhand and Chhattisgarh High Courts
- Rajiv Gupta (technocrat), Indian-American technology executive
- Rajiv L. Gupta, chairman of Delphi Automotive
- Rajeev Gupta, father of Siddhartha Gupta who was involved in the 1999 Delhi hit-and-run case

== See also ==
- Raj Gupta (disambiguation)
