= Gurdev Singh Badal =

Indian politician

Cabinet Minister of Punjab
- In office 1997–2002
- Governor: B. K. N. Chhibber; Jack Farj Rafael Jacob
- Chief Minister: Parkash Singh Badal
- Department: Agriculture and Farmer Welfare

Member of the Punjab Legislative Assembly for Panjgrain
- In office 1997 - 2007
- Preceded by: Gurcharan Singh Tohra
- Succeeded by: Joginder Singh
- In office 1977 - 1992
- Preceded by: New Seat
- Succeeded by: Gurcharan Singh Tohra

Personal details
- Born: 1932/1934; Punjab, British India
- Died: 27 March 2017; Ludhiana, Punjab, India
- Political party: Shiromani Akali Dal
- Children: 2 sons and 1 daughter

Gurudev Singh Badal was an Indian-Punjabi politician who served as cabinet minister of Agriculture of Punjab during the tenure of Prakash Singh Badal. He was the vice-president of the Shiromani Akhali Dal. He served as member of Punjab Legislative Assembly from Panjgrain (now Jaitu).

One of his sons, Kewal Singh Badal, was the vice-president of the Shiromani Gurudwara Parbhandhak Committee. His other son, Suba Singh, ran unsuccessfully in the last assembly elections for the Jaitu seat.

Badal was known to have close association with former chief minister Badal. He was given the surname ‘Badal’ by Sant Fateh Singh, who led the Punjab Suba movement.

Badal died at Dayanand Medical College and Hospital in Ludhiana on March 28, 2017.
