= Banga Assembly constituency =

Legislative Assembly constituency in Punjab State, India

Coordinates: 31.18°N 75.99°E

Banga
- Constituency No. 46 for the Punjab Legislative Assembly

Constituency details
- Country: India
- State: Punjab
- District: Nawan Shahr
- Lok Sabha constituency: Anandpur Sahib
- Total electors: 165,283 (in 2022)
- Reservation: SC

Member of Legislative Assembly
- 16th Punjab Legislative Assembly
- Incumbent Sukhwinder Kumar
- Party: Aam Aadmi Party
- Elected year: 2022

Banga is a Punjab Legislative Assembly constituency in Shahid Bhagat Singh Nagar district, Punjab state, India.

== Members of the Legislative Assembly ==
Most successful parties from Banga Vidhan Sabha
1. INC (5 Times) (35.7%)
2. SAD (5 Times) (35.7%)
3. AD – SFS (1 Time) (7.14%)
4. BSP (1 Time) (7.14%)
5. CPI (M) (1 Time) (7.14%)
6. INC (I) (1 Time) (7.14%)

Year	Member	Party
1962	Dilbagh Singh	Indian National Congress
1967	H. Ram	Akali Dal – Sant Fateh Singh Group
1969	Jagat Ram Soondh	Indian National Congress
1972	Jagat Ram Soondh	Indian National Congress
1977	Harbans Singh	Communist Party of India
1980	Jagat Ram Soondh	Indian National Congress (Indira)
1985	Balwant Singh	Shiromani Akali Dal
1992	Satnam Singh Kainth	Bahujan Samaj Party
1997	Mohan Lal	Shiromani Akali Dal
2002	Tarlochan Singh	Indian National Congress
2007	Mohan Lal	Shiromani Akali Dal
2012	Tarlochan Singh	Indian National Congress
2017	Sukhwinder Kumar	Shiromani Akali Dal
2022	Sukhwinder Kumar	Shiromani Akali Dal

== Election results ==
=== 2027 ===
Punjab Assembly election, 2027: Banga
Party	Candidate	Votes	%	±%
AAP				
AD (WPD)				New entry
INC				
BSP				
SAD				
BJP				
NOTA	None of the above			
Majority				
Turnout				

=== 2022 ===
Punjab Assembly election, 2022: Banga
Party	Candidate	Votes	%	±%
SAD	Sukhwinder Kumar	37,338	32.38	
INC	Tarlochan Singh Soondh	32,269	27.99	
AAP	Kuljit Singh Sarhal	32,020	27.77	
Independent	Raj Kumar Mahal Khurd	5,840	5.07	
BJP	Mohan Lal Behram	3,974	3.45	New
SAD(A)	Makhan Singh Taharpuri	1,097	0.95	
NOTA	None of the above	1,004	0.87	
Majority		5,069	4.39	
Registered electors		165,283		
SAD hold		Swing		

=== 2017 ===
Punjab Assembly election, 2017: Banga
Party	Candidate	Votes	%	±%
SAD	Sukhwinder Kumar	45,256	36.93	
AAP	Harjot	43,363	35.39	
INC	Satnam Singh Kainth	13,408	10.94	
BSP	Rajinder Singh	11,874	9.69	
Independent	Tarlochan Singh	6,294	5.14	
CPI	Paul Ram	986	0.8	
APP	Sarabjit Singh	594	0.48	
NOTA	None of the above	758	0.62	
Registered electors		159,003		
SAD gain from INC		Swing		

=== Previous results ===
Year	A C No.	Name	Party	Votes	Runner Up	Party	Votes
2012	46	Tarlochan Singh	INC	42023	Mohan Singh	SAD	38808
2007	36	Mohan Lal	SAD	36581	Tarlochan Singh	INC	33856
2002	37	Tarlochan Singh	INC	27574	Mohan Lal	BSP	23919
1997	37	Mohan Lal	SAD	27757	Satnam Singh Kainth	BSP	27148
1992	37	Satnam Singh Kainth	BSP	14272	Doger Ram	INC	12042
1985	37	Balwant Singh	SAD	22813	Jagat Ram	INC	20797
1980	37	Jagat Ram Soondh	INC (I)	24853	Bhagat Ram	CPM	19550
1977	37	Harbans Singh	CPM	23695	Jagat Ram Soondh	INC	22083
1972	59	Jagat Ram Soondh	INC	21248	Balwant Singh Sarhal	IND	13676
1969	59	Jagat Ram Soondh	INC	20901	Nasib Chand	CPM	13500
1967	59	H. Ram	ADS	16368	Jagat Ram	INC	15293
1962	98	Dilbagh Singh	INC	27936	Haguranad Singh	AD	10424
