= Manoranjan Kalia =

Indian politician

Minister of Local Bodies Government of Punjab
- In office 2 March 2007 – 12 May 2011
- Chief Minister: Prakash Singh Badal
- Succeeded by: Tikshan Sud

Minister of Commerce & Industry Government of Punjab
- In office 2 March 2007 – 12 May 2011
- Chief Minister: Prakash Singh Badal
- Succeeded by: Tikshan Sud

Member of Punjab Legislative Assembly
- In office 2007–2017
- Preceded by: Raj Kumar Gupta
- Succeeded by: Rajinder Beri
- Constituency: Jalandhar Central
- In office 1997–2002
- Preceded by: Jai Kishan Saini
- Succeeded by: Raj Kumar Gupta
- Constituency: Jalandhar Central

Personal details
- Born: 9 December 1958 (age 67) Nakodar, Jalandhar, Punjab
- Party: Bharatiya Janata Party
- Parents: Manmohan Kalia (father); Kadamri Devi (mother)
- Profession: Advocate, Politician

Manoranjan Kalia is a leader of Bharatiya Janata Party legislature party in Punjab in India and was cabinet minister in Akali Dal- BJP government. His residence is at Jalandhar City. He contested for the seat of MLA from Jalandhar Central. Manoranjan Kalia is basically a lawyer, later on he joined politics. In the previous SAD-BJP Government in Punjab, Manoranjan Kalia had the status of Cabinet Minister and was representing Bhartiya Janta Party in the Government.
