= Ludhiana North Assembly constituency =

Legislative Assembly constituency in Punjab State, India

Coordinates: 30.94°N 75.83°E

Ludhiana North
- Constituency No. 65 for the Punjab Legislative Assembly

Constituency details
- Country: India
- State: Punjab
- District: Ludhiana
- Lok Sabha constituency: Ludhiana
- Established: 2008
- Total electors: 201,620
- Reservation: None

Member of Legislative Assembly
- 16th Punjab Legislative Assembly
- Incumbent Madan Lal Bagga
- Party: Aam Aadmi Party
- Elected year: 2022

Ludhiana North Assembly constituency is one of the 117 Legislative Assembly constituencies of Punjab state in India. It is part of Ludhiana district.

== Members of the Legislative Assembly ==
Most Successful parties from Ludhiana North Assembly Constituency
1. INC (8 Times) (66.7%)
2. BJP (1 Time) (8.33%)
3. JP (1 Time) (8.33%)
4. AAP (1 Time) (8.33%)
5. INC (I) (1 Time) (8.33%)

Year	Member	Party
1972	Sardari Lal kapoor	Indian National Congress
1977	Kapoor Chand	Janata Party
1980	Sardari Lal Kapoor	Indian National Congress
1985	Sat Pal Prashar	Indian National Congress
1992	Rakesh Pandey	Indian National Congress
1997	Rakesh Kumar	Indian National Congress
1997^	Rakesh Pandey	Indian National Congress
2002	Rakesh Pandey	Indian National Congress
2007	Harish Bedi	Bharatiya Janata Party
2012	Rakesh Pandey	Indian National Congress
2017	Rakesh Pandey	Indian National Congress
2022	Madan Lal Bagga	Aam Aadmi Party

== Election results ==
=== 2027 ===
Punjab Assembly election, 2027: Ludhiana North
Party	Candidate	Votes	%	±%
AAP	Madan Lal Bagga			
AD (WPD)				New entry
INC				
BSP				
SAD				
BJP				
NOTA	None of the above			
Majority				
Turnout				

=== 2022 ===
Punjab Assembly election, 2022: Ludhiana North
Party	Candidate	Votes	%	±%
AAP	Madan Lal Bagga	51,104	40.59	
BJP	Parveen Bansal	35,822	28.45	
INC	Rakesh Pandey	24,326	19.32	
SAD	RD Sharma	11,454	9.1	
Majority		15282		12.14
Registered electors		205,144		
AAP gain from INC				

=== 2017 ===
Punjab Assembly election, 2017: Ludhiana North
Party	Candidate	Votes	%	±%
INC	Rakesh Pandey	44,864	36.0	
BJP	Parveen Bansal	39,732	31.9	
LIP	Randhir Singh Sivia	20,387	16.4	
Independent	Madan Lal Bagga	12,136	9.7	
NOTA	None of the above	1,307	0.7	
Majority		5,132	4.2	
Turnout		123,250	68.5	
Registered electors		181,930		

=== 2012 ===
Punjab Assembly election, 2012: Ludhiana North
Party	Candidate	Votes	%	±%
INC	Rakesh Pandey	48,216	43.3	
BJP	Parveen Bansal	46,048	41.4	
BSP	Hansraj	10,280	9.30	
Majority		2,168	1.9	
Turnout		111,194	68.9	
Registered electors		161,310		

== See also ==
- List of constituencies of the Punjab Legislative Assembly
- Ludhiana district
