= Madan Lal Bagga =

Indian politician

MLA, Punjab Legislative Assembly
- Incumbent
- Assumed office 2022
- Preceded by: Rakesh Pandey
- Constituency: Ludhiana North
- Majority: Aam Aadmi Party

Personal details
- Party: Aam Aadmi Party

Madan Lal Bagga is an Indian politician and the MLA representing the Ludhiana North Assembly constituency in the Punjab Legislative Assembly. He is a member of the Aam Aadmi Party. He was elected as the MLA in the 2022 Punjab Legislative Assembly election.

== Member of Legislative Assembly ==
He represents the Ludhiana North Assembly constituency as MLA in Punjab Assembly. The Aam Aadmi Party gained a strong 79% majority in the sixteenth Punjab Legislative Assembly by winning 92 out of 117 seats in the 2022 Punjab Legislative Assembly election. MP Bhagwant Mann was sworn in as Chief Minister on 16 March 2022.

Committee assignments of Punjab Legislative Assembly

- Member (2022–23) Committee on Government Assurances
- Member (2022–23) Committee on Local Bodies

== Electoral performance ==
Punjab Assembly election, 2022: Ludhiana North
Party	Candidate	Votes	%	±%
AAP	Madan Lal Bagga	51,104	40.59	
BJP	Parveen Bansal	35,822	28.45	
INC	Rakesh Pandey	24,326	19.32	
SAD	RD Sharma	11,454	9.1	
Majority		15282		12.14
Registered electors		205,144		
AAP gain from INC				

State Legislative Assembly
Preceded by -	Member of the Punjab Legislative Assembly from Ludhiana North Assembly constituency 2022 –	Incumbent
