= Jalandhar Central Assembly constituency =

Legislative Assembly constituency in Punjab State, India

Coordinates: 31.33°N 75.58°E

Jalandhar Central
- Constituency No. 35 for the Punjab Legislative Assembly

Constituency details
- Country: India
- State: Punjab
- District: Jalandhar
- Lok Sabha constituency: Jalandhar
- Total electors: 174,003 (in 2022)
- Reservation: None

Member of Legislative Assembly
- 16th Punjab Legislative Assembly
- Incumbent Raman Arora
- Party: Aam Aadmi Party
- Elected year: 2022

Jalandhar Central Assembly constituency is one of the 117 Legislative Assembly constituencies of Punjab state in India. It is part of Jalandhar district.

== Members of the Legislative Assembly ==
Most successful parties from Jalandhar Central Vidhan Sabha
1. BJP (4 Times) (40.0%)
2. INC (3 Times) (30.0%)
3. AAP (1 Time) (10.0%)
4. JP (1 Time) (10.0%)
5. INC (I) (1 Time) (10.0%)

Year	Member	Party
Jullundur Central constituency
1977	Manmohan Kalia	Janata Party
1980	Yash	Indian National Congress (Indira)
1985	Manmohan Kalia	Bharatiya Janata Party
1992	Jai Kishan Saini	Indian National Congress
1997	Manoranjan Kalia	Bharatiya Janata Party
2002	Raj Kumar Gupta	Indian National Congress
2007	Manoranjan Kalia	Bharatiya Janata Party
Jalandhar Central constituency
2012	Manoranjan Kalia	Bharatiya Janata Party
2017	Rajinder Beri	Indian National Congress
2022	Raman Arora	Aam Aadmi Party

== Election results ==
=== 2027 ===
Punjab Assembly election, 2027: Jalandhar Central
Party	Candidate	Votes	%	±%
AAP	Nitin Kohli			
INC	Rajinder Beri			
BJP	Manoranjan Kalia			
AD (WPD)				New entry
BSP				
SAD				
NOTA	None of the above			
Majority				
Turnout				

=== 2022 ===
2022 Punjab Legislative Assembly election: Jalandhar Central
Party	Candidate	Votes	%	±%
AAP	Raman Arora	33,011	31.30	▲16.9
INC	Rajinder Beri	32,764	31.0	▼21.2
BJP	Manoranjan Kalia	27,993	26.50	▼3.1
SAD	Chandan Kumar Grewal	10,907	10.30	New
NOTA	None of the Above	953	0.5	New
Majority		247	0.23	
Turnout		106,554	61.1	
Registered electors		174,285		
AAP gain from INC				

=== 2017 ===
2017 Punjab Legislative Assembly election: Jalandhar Central
Party	Candidate	Votes	%	±%
INC	Rajinder Beri	55,518	52.20	▲7.2
BJP	Manoranjan Kalia	31,440	29.60	▼16.5
AAP	Dr. Sanjeev Sharma	15,269	14.40	
BSP	Madan Bhatti	1,261	1.2	
NOTA	None of the Above	1,044	0.7	
Majority		24,078	22.90	
Turnout		105,303	68.20	
Registered electors		155,901		
INC gain from BJP				

=== 2012 ===
2012 Punjab Legislative Assembly election: Jalandhar Central
Party	Candidate	Votes	%	±%
BJP	Manoranjan Kalia	44,963	46.10	
INC	Rajinder Beri	43,898	45.0	
BSP	Rajinder Singh	4,678	4.80	
Majority		1,065	1.10	
Turnout		97,457	70.0	
Registered electors		141,433		
INC gain from BJP				

=== 2007 ===
2007 Punjab Legislative Assembly election: Jalandhar Central
Party	Candidate	Votes	%	±%
BJP	Manoranjan Kalia	47,221	52.6	
INC	Tajinder Singh Bittu	28,212	31.4	
Independent	Sheetal Vij	11,330	12.6	
Majority		19,009	21.2	
Turnout		89,781	65.7	
INC gain from BJP				

== See also ==
- List of constituencies of the Punjab Legislative Assembly
- Jalandhar district
