= Joginder Pal Pandey =

Indian politician

Joginder Pal Pandey was a leader of Indian National Congress from Punjab, India. He was a member of Punjab Legislative Assembly and a minister. He was killed by militants in 1987.

After his death, his son Rakesh Pandey was elected as the MLA from Punjab.
