= Amloh Assembly constituency =

Legislative Assembly constituency in Punjab State, India

Coordinates: 30.61°N 76.23°E

Amloh
- Constituency No. 56 for the Punjab Legislative Assembly

Constituency details
- Country: India
- State: Punjab
- District: Sri Fatehgarh Sahib
- Lok Sabha constituency: Fatehgarh Sahib
- Total electors: 144,482 (in 2022)
- Reservation: None

Member of Legislative Assembly
- 16th Punjab Legislative Assembly
- Incumbent Gurinder Singh Garry
- Party: Aam Aadmi Party
- Elected year: 2022

Amloh Assembly constituency (Sl. No.: 56) is a Punjab Legislative Assembly constituency in Fatehgarh Sahib district, Punjab state, India.

== Members of the Legislative Assembly ==
Most successful parties from Amloh Vidhan Sabha
1. INC (7 Times) (46.7%)
2. SAD (5 Times) (33.3%)
3. IND (2 Times) (13.3%)
4. AAP (1 Time) (6.67%)

| Year | Member | Party |
|---|---|---|
As part of PEPSU Legislative Assembly (1951–56)
Created from Amloh-Payal Assembly constituency
| 1954 | Mihan Singh | Independent |
| 1954 | Gian Singh Rarewala | Independent |
Dissolved into Sirhind Assembly constituency (1956-1967)
As part of Punjab Legislative Assembly (1967–Present)
| 1967 | Bhag Singh | Indian National Congress |
| 1969 | Dalip Singh Pandhi | Shiromani Akali Dal |
| 1972 | Harchand Singh | Indian National Congress |
| 1977 | Dalip Singh Pandhi | Shiromani Akali Dal |
| 1980 | Dalip Singh Pandhi | Shiromani Akali Dal |
| 1985 | Dalip Singh Pandhi | Shiromani Akali Dal |
| 1992 | Sadhu Singh | Indian National Congress |
| 1997 | Balwant Singh | Shiromani Akali Dal |
| 2002 | Sadhu Singh | Indian National Congress |
| 2007 | Sadhu Singh | Indian National Congress |
| 2012 | Randeep Singh Nabha | Indian National Congress |
| 2017 | Randeep Singh Nabha | Indian National Congress |
| 2022 | Gurinder Singh Garry | Aam Aadmi Party |

== Election results ==
=== 2027 ===
Punjab Assembly election, 2027: Amloh
| Party | Candidate | Votes | % | ±% |
|---|---|---|---|---|
| AAP | Gurinder Singh Garry | | | |
| AD (WPD) | | | | New entry |
| INC | | | | |
| BSP | | | | |
| SAD | | | | |
| BJP | | | | |
| NOTA | None of the above | | | |
| Majority | | | | |
| Turnout | | | | |

=== 2022 ===
Punjab Assembly election, 2022: Amloh
| Party | Candidate | Votes | % | ±% |
|---|---|---|---|---|
| AAP | Gurinder Singh Garry | 52,912 | 46.43 | |
| SAD | Gurpreet Singh Raju Khanna | 28,249 | 24.79 | |
| INC | Randeep Singh Nabha | 16,077 | 14.11 | |
| BJP | Kanwarveer Singh Tohra | 9,488 | 8.33 | New |
| SAD(A) | Lakhveer Singh Sounti | 3,793 | 3.33 | |
| Independent | Darshan Singh Babbi | 1,243 | 1.09 | |
| NOTA | None of the above | 523 | 0.46 | |
| Majority | | 24,663 | 21.64 | |
| Turnout | | | | |
| Registered electors | | 144,482 | | |
| AAP gain from INC | | Swing | | |

=== 2017 ===
Punjab Assembly election, 2017: Amloh
| Party | Candidate | Votes | % | ±% |
|---|---|---|---|---|
| INC | Randeep Singh Nabha | 39669 | 34.96 | |
| SAD | Gurpreet Singh Raju | 35723 | 31.49 | |
| AAP | Gurpreet Singh Bhatti | 30573 | 26.95 | |
| Independent | Jagmeet Singh Sahota | 3187 | 2.81 | |
| SAD(A) | Lakhvir Singh | 1144 | 1.01 | |
| BSP | Ram Singh | 942 | 0.83 | |
| Independent | Navab Ali | 432 | 0.38 | |
| Independent | Rajinder Singh | 359 | 0.32 | |
| HSS | Sanjiv Kumar Pilot | 222 | 0.2 | |
| Independent | Gurpreet Singh Bhatti | 213 | 0.19 | |
| JWJK | Gurjinder Singh | 149 | 0.13 | |
| NOTA | None of the above | 841 | 0.74 | |
| Registered electors | | 135,525 | | |

=== Prev. Results ===
| Year | A C No. | Category | Name | Party | Votes | Runner Up | Party | Votes |
|---|---|---|---|---|---|---|---|---|
| 2012 | 56 | GEN | Randeep Singh Nabha | INC | 32503 | Jagdeep Singh Cheema | SAD | 29975 |
| 2007 | 77 | SC | Sadhu Singh | INC | 59556 | Satwinder Kaur | SAD | 52879 |
| 2002 | 78 | SC | Sadhu Singh | INC | 45383 | Gurdev Singh | SAD | 26633 |
| 1997 | 78 | SC | Balwant Singh | SAD | 44204 | Sadhu Singh | INC | 31472 |
| 1992 | 78 | SC | Sadhu Singh | INC | 8500 | Dalip Singh Pandhi | SAD | 3039 |
| 1985 | 78 | SC | Dalip Singh Pandhi | SAD | 38639 | Gurdev Singh | INC | 24206 |
| 1980 | 78 | SC | Dilip Singh Pandhi | SAD | 30881 | Harchand Singh | INC(I) | 29405 |
| 1977 | 78 | SC | Dalip Singh Pandhi | SAD | 32974 | Harchand Singh | INC | 20623 |
| 1972 | 84 | SC | Harchand Singh | INC | 25120 | Dalip Singh | SAD | 24704 |
| 1969 | 84 | SC | Dalip Singh | SAD | 25875 | Bhag Singh | INC | 14494 |
| 1967 | 84 | SC | Bhag. Singh | INC | 14629 | S. Singh | ADS | 13146 |
