= Raj Gupta =

Raj Gupta may refer to:

- Raj Kumar Gupta (disambiguation)
- Rajiv Gupta (disambiguation)
  - Rajiv L. Gupta, chairman of Delphi Automotive
- Rajat Gupta, former managing director of McKinsey & Company implicated in an insider trading scandale

== See also ==
- List of Gupta emperors, emperors (rajas/maharajas) of the ancient Indian Gupta Empire

...
