= 1992 Punjab Legislative Assembly election =

1992 Punjab Legislative Assembly Election
- 19 February 1992

All 117 seats of the Punjab Legislative Assembly 59 seats needed for a majority
- Turnout: 23.82 (▼42.68%)
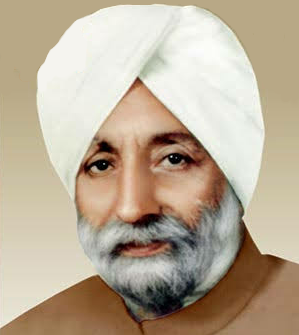

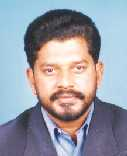
	Majority party	Minority party	Third party
			BJP
Leader	Beant Singh	Satnam Singh Kainth	Madan Mohan Mittal
Party	INC	BSP	BJP
Leader's seat	Jullundur Cantonment (won)	Banga (won)	Nangal (won)
Last election	32	6	6
Seats after	87	9	6
Seat change	▲55	▲9	Steady
Popular vote	1,317,075	490.552	4,95,161
Percentage	43.83%	16.32%	16.48%
Swing	▲6.2%	▲16.32%	▲11.49%
Chief Minister before election
President's rule
Elected Chief Minister
Beant Singh
INC

Legislative Assembly elections were held in the Indian state of Punjab on the 19 February 1992 to elect the members of the Punjab Legislative Assembly. Chief Minister Beant Singh was elected as the leader of the ruling party.

== Voter turnout ==
#	Const. Name	Electors	Voters	Valid	Poll %
1	Fatehgarh	1,07,453	9,421	9,105	8.77%
2	Batala	1,16,607	39,833	38,671	34.16%
3	Qadian	1,20,309	11,930	11,565	9.92%
4	Srihargobindpur	1,00,327	8,070	7,678	8.04%
5	Kahnuwan	1,00,053	14,063	13,314	14.06%
6	Dhariwal	1,05,687	14,258	13,338	13.49%
7	Gurdaspur	1,13,514	33,232	32,252	29.28%
8	Dina Nagar (SC)	1,12,934	40,027	38,632	35.44%
9	Narot Mehra (SC)	96,919	54,914	52,543	56.66%
10	Pathankot	1,07,882	60,928	59,348	56.48%
11	Sujanpur	98,308	60,981	58,418	62.03%
12	Beas	1,14,378	13,626	12,779	11.91%
13	Majitha	1,02,801	24,786	23,709	24.11%
14	Verka (SC)	1,25,519	9,841	9,460	7.84%
15	Jandiala (SC)	1,16,250	9,707	8,967	8.35%
16	Amritsar North	1,05,081	37,727	36,815	35.90%
17	Amritsar West	1,38,532	40,669	39,147	29.36%
18	Amritsar Central	83,444	42,191	41,164	50.56%
19	Amritsar South	1,11,525	27,671	27,020	24.81%
20	Ajnala	1,14,139	12,717	11,718	11.14%
21	Raja Sansi	97,659	6,843	6,390	7.01%
22	Attari (SC)	93,913	5,671	5,250	6.04%
23	Tarn Taran	1,07,254	0	0	0.00%
24	Khadoor Sahib (SC)	1,04,908	9,673	9,010	9.22%
25	Naushahra Panwan	96,807	4,962	4,756	5.13%
26	Patti	1,14,868	10,506	9,870	9.15%
27	Valtoha	1,00,975	23,800	23,251	23.57%
28	Adampur	1,11,030	18,360	17,630	16.54%
29	Jullundur Cantonment	1,07,860	31,922	31,309	29.60%
30	Jullundur North	1,06,039	49,186	48,073	46.38%
31	Jullundur Central	1,02,301	39,588	38,515	38.70%
32	Jullundur South (SC)	1,04,588	38,988	37,974	37.28%
33	Kartarpur (SC)	1,07,131	19,575	18,805	18.27%
34	Lohian	1,25,293	27,827	26,529	22.21%
35	Nakodar	1,12,582	26,801	26,075	23.81%
36	Nur Mahal	1,16,307	39,470	38,063	33.94%
37	Banga (SC)	1,04,692	36,450	34,788	34.82%
38	Nawan Shahr	1,33,555	53,908	52,450	40.36%
39	Phillaur (SC)	1,18,184	28,832	27,750	24.40%
40	Bholath	1,02,656	4,601	4,376	4.48%
41	Kapurthala	95,308	25,397	24,473	26.65%
42	Sultanpur	1,03,143	39,165	37,911	37.97%
43	Phagwara (SC)	1,26,856	41,493	39,599	32.71%
44	Balachaur	1,14,643	50,687	48,166	44.21%
45	Garhshankar	1,01,860	45,532	43,376	44.70%
46	Mahilpur (SC)	90,421	24,518	23,528	27.12%
47	Hoshiarpur	1,13,328	53,986	51,749	47.64%
48	Sham Chaurasi (SC)	1,09,849	26,634	25,469	24.25%
49	Tanda	1,08,438	22,836	22,174	21.06%
50	Garhdiwala (SC)	1,08,635	27,191	26,055	25.03%
51	Dasuya	1,11,295	47,055	45,295	42.28%
52	Mukerian	1,22,321	63,313	61,329	51.76%
53	Jagraon	1,24,528	13,193	12,661	10.59%
54	Raikot	1,06,815	7,609	7,147	7.12%
55	Dakha (SC)	1,54,309	7,151	6,616	4.63%
56	Qila Raipur	1,11,288	4,272	4,095	3.84%
57	Ludhiana North	1,25,001	57,809	56,027	46.25%
58	Ludhiana West	1,24,432	34,039	33,152	27.36%
59	Ludhiana East	1,12,814	35,578	34,514	31.54%
60	Ludhiana Rural	2,23,364	29,819	28,653	13.35%
61	Payal	1,07,969	17,824	17,078	16.51%
62	Kum Kalan (SC)	1,18,482	8,086	7,707	6.82%
63	Samrala	99,759	14,996	14,278	15.03%
64	Khanna (SC)	1,13,939	23,210	22,404	20.37%
65	Nangal	1,01,935	48,863	46,789	47.94%
66	Anandpur Sahib-Ropar	1,08,522	34,573	33,045	31.86%
67	Chamkaur Sahib (SC)	1,01,931	7,652	7,191	7.51%
68	Morinda	1,16,975	11,828	11,373	10.11%
69	Kharar	1,38,642	9,632	9,183	6.95%
70	Banur	1,11,069	43,389	41,376	39.06%
71	Rajpura	1,15,973	31,367	30,214	27.05%
72	Ghanaur	1,04,264	26,203	24,460	25.13%
73	Dakala	1,21,698	25,375	23,594	20.85%
74	Shutrana (SC)	1,15,121	16,985	16,078	14.75%
75	Samana	1,43,983	0	0	0.00%
76	Patiala Town	1,07,060	37,876	36,480	35.38%
77	Nabha	1,21,005	41,484	39,590	34.28%
78	Amloh (SC)	1,30,524	13,958	13,446	10.69%
79	Sirhind	1,20,771	16,585	15,858	13.73%
80	Dhuri	1,14,120	12,581	11,827	11.02%
81	Malerkotla	1,24,824	34,327	33,161	27.50%
82	Sherpur (SC)	1,01,581	4,193	3,969	4.13%
83	Barnala	1,07,892	9,495	9,019	8.80%
84	Bhadaur (SC)	1,02,178	2,384	2,263	2.33%
85	Dhanaula	1,00,088	5,744	5,394	5.74%
86	Sangrur	1,10,803	21,987	21,133	19.84%
87	Dirbha	1,01,807	8,205	7,696	8.06%
88	Sunam	1,07,763	14,368	13,781	13.33%
89	Lehra	1,03,176	29,296	27,137	28.39%
90	Balluana (SC)	1,09,139	39,062	36,976	35.79%
91	Abohar	1,31,018	71,880	69,002	54.86%
92	Fazilka	1,06,585	63,792	60,203	59.85%
93	Jalalabad	1,31,896	77,501	73,511	58.76%
94	Guru Har Sahai	1,25,635	62,608	59,453	49.83%
95	Firozepur	1,15,234	48,612	46,022	42.19%
96	Firozepur Cantonment	98,750	43,818	41,248	44.37%
97	Zira	1,15,266	33,981	32,431	29.48%
98	Dharamkot (SC)	1,10,967	14,941	14,074	13.46%
99	Moga	1,10,970	26,532	25,554	23.91%
100	Bagha Purana	1,06,317	12,118	11,498	11.40%
101	Nihal Singh Wala (SC)	1,00,821	10,362	9,911	10.28%
102	Panjgrain (SC)	1,03,071	4,170	3,920	4.05%
103	Kot Kapura	1,20,918	31,770	30,390	26.27%
104	Faridkot	1,24,005	32,800	31,282	26.45%
105	Muktsar	1,18,043	51,106	48,774	43.29%
106	Giddar Baha	1,10,717	32,406	30,670	29.27%
107	Malout (SC)	1,08,758	41,273	39,070	37.95%
108	Lambi	1,03,698	26,738	25,532	25.78%
109	Talwandi Sabo	96,886	10,199	9,036	10.53%
110	Pakka Kalan (SC)	1,06,645	16,049	15,318	15.05%
111	Bhatinda	1,47,857	41,355	39,704	27.97%
112	Nathana (SC)	1,07,703	7,047	6,673	6.54%
113	Rampura Phul	1,06,042	19,076	17,910	17.99%
114	Joga	1,00,111	1,072	1,018	1.07%
115	Mansa	1,15,426	17,755	16,947	15.38%
116	Budhlada	1,10,375	19,654	18,578	17.81%
117	Sardulgarh	1,06,232	6,940	6,358	6.53%
TOTAL		1,31,71,851	31,37,915	30,05,083	23.82%

== Participating Parties ==
=== List of Participating Political Parties in Punjab Assembly Election in 1992 ===
S. No.	Party Abbreviation	Party
National Parties
1.	INC	Indian National Congress
2	CPI	Communist Party Of India
3	CPM	Communist Party Of India (Marxist)
4.	BJP	Bharatiya Janata Party
5	JD	Janata Dal
6	LKD	Lok Dal
State Parties
7	BSP	Bahujan Samaj Party
8	SAD	Shiromani Akali Dal (Kabul)
Registered(Unrecognised) Parties
9	BKUS	Bharatiya Krishni Udyog Santh
10	CPI(ML)	Communist Party Of India (Marxist Leninist)
11	DPP	Dalit Panthers Party
12	IPF	Indian Peoples Front
13	SBJ(MD)	All India Shiromani Baba Jiwan Singh Mazhabi Dal
14	UCPI	United Communist Party Of India
Independents
15	IND	Independents

== Results ==
The election results were declared with the Indian National Congress winning an absolute majority of 87 seats out of 117.

Summary of results of the Punjab Legislative Assembly election, 1992
Party	No. of Candidates	Seats won	Votes	Vote %
Indian National Congress	116	87	13,17,075	43.83%
Bharatiya Janata Party	66	6	4,95,161	16.48%
Bahujan Samaj Party	105	9	4,90,552	16.32%
Communist Party of India	20	4	1,09,386	3.64%
Shiromani Akali Dal	58	3	1,56,171	5.20%
Communist Party of India (M)	17	1	72,061	2.40%
Janata Dal	37	1	64,666	2.15%
United Communist Party of India	1	1	14442	0.48%
Indian People's Front	2	1	2,292	0.08%
Independents	151	4	2,77,706	9.24%
Total	579	117	30,05,083	

== Results by Region ==
=== Region wise results ===
Region	Seats					
Region	Seats	INC	BSP	CPI	BJP	OTH
Malwa	65	47	3	3	4	8
Majha	27	21	0	2	2	2
Doaba	25	19	6	0	0	0
Sum	117	87	9	5	6	10

== Result by Constituency ==
Constituency		Winner				Runner Up				Margin	%
#	Name	Candidate	Party	Votes	%	Candidate	Party	Votes	%	Margin	%
1	Fatehgarh	Lakhmir Singh	INC	4,205	46.18	Khairati Lal	BJP	3,906	42.90	299	3.28
2	Batala	Jagdish	BJP	20,288	52.46	Ashwani	INC	17,229	44.55	3,059	7.91
3	Qadian	Tripat Rajinder Singh	INC	9,560	82.66	Kashmir Singh	BJP	1,173	10.14	8,387	72.52
4	Sri Hargobindpur	Gurnam Singh	CPI	5,000	65.12	Mustak Masih	INC	1,115	14.52	3,885	50.60
5	Kahnuwan	Pratap Singh	INC	9,042	67.91	Kashmir Singh	BJP	2,408	18.09	6,634	49.82
6	Dhariwal	Sushil Mahajan	INC	7,245	54.32	Umar Masih	BJP	2,844	21.32	4,401	33.00
7	Gurdaspur	Khushhal Bahi	INC	18,076	56.05	Mohan Lal Mohni	BJP	8,938	27.71	9,138	28.34
8	Dina Nagar (SC)	Krishna Kumar	INC	24,275	62.84	Tilak Raj	BJP	9,668	25.03	14,607	37.81
9	Narot Mehra (SC)	Krishan Chand	INC	25,479	48.49	Ram Lal	BJP	16,208	30.85	9,271	17.64
10	Pathankot	Raman Kumar	INC	32,130	54.14	Master Mohan Lal	BJP	21,595	36.39	10,535	17.75
11	Sujanpur	Raghu Nath Sahai	INC	21,212	36.31	Satya Pal Saini	BJP	18,409	31.51	2,803	4.80
12	Beas	Vir Pawan Kumar	INC	3,636	28.45	Kulwant Singh	IND	3,107	24.31	529	4.14
13	Majitha	Ranjit Singh	IND	14,502	61.17	Surinder Pal Singh	INC	7,686	32.42	6,816	28.75
14	Verka (SC)	Gurmej Singh	INC	7,426	78.50	Karatar Singh	BJP	1,596	16.87	5,830	61.63
15	Jandiala (SC)	Sardul Singh	INC	4,560	50.85	Sardul Singh Nona	BSP	1,245	13.88	3,315	36.97
16	Amritsar North	Faqur Chand	INC	20,412	55.44	Sat Pal Mahajan	BJP	15,949	43.32	4,463	12.12
17	Amritsar West	Vimla Dang	CPI	19,140	48.89	Sewa Ram	INC	13,812	35.28	5,328	13.61
18	Amritsar Central	Laxmi Kanta	BJP	22,296	54.16	Darbari Lal	INC	18,198	44.21	4,098	9.95
19	Amritsar South	Maninderjit Singh	INC	19,451	71.99	Raj Kumar	BJP	7,461	27.61	11,990	44.38
20	Ajnala	Harcharn Singh	INC	8,893	75.89	Bhagwan Dass	BJP	1,461	12.47	7,432	63.42
21	Raja Sansi	Parminder Singh	INC	2,869	44.90	Jang Bahadur Singh	BSP	2,097	32.82	772	12.08
22	Attari (SC)	Sukhdev Singh Shehbazpuri	INC	2,722	51.85	Kunwant Singh Mubaba	BSP	2,238	42.63	484	9.22
23	Tarn Taran	Dilbag Singh	INC	Won Unopposed							
24	Khadoor Sahib (SC)	Ranjit Singh	SAD	4,034	44.77	Lakha Singh	INC	3,736	41.47	298	3.30
25	Naushahra Panwan	Jagir Singh	INC	4,418	92.89	Kirpal Singh	BSP	338	7.11	4,080	85.78
26	Patti	Sakhwinder Singh	INC	6,303	63.86	Pirthipal Singh	SAD	2,640	26.75	3,663	37.11
27	Valtoha	Gurchet Singh	INC	20,048	86.22	Gopal Singh	BSP	3,203	13.78	16,845	72.44
28	Adampur	Rajender Kumar	BSP	7,847	44.51	Manjinder Singh	INC	7,235	41.04	612	3.47
29	Jullundur Cantt.	Beant Singh	INC	18,449	58.93	Gulzara Ram	BSP	8,336	26.62	10,113	32.31
30	Jullundur North	Avtar Henry	INC	34,179	71.10	Vaid Om Parkash	BJP	11,084	23.06	23,095	48.04
31	Jullundur Central	Jai Kishan Saini	INC	23,002	59.72	Manoranjan Kalia	BJP	14,367	37.30	8,635	22.42
32	Jullundur South (SC)	Mohinder Singh Kaypee	INC	21,022	55.36	Jaswinder Paul	BSP	11,368	29.94	9,654	25.42
33	Kartarpur (SC)	Jagjit Singh	INC	12,036	64.00	Ram Lal	BSP	5,923	31.50	6,113	32.50
34	Lohian	Brij Bhupinder Singh	INC	16,036	60.45	Chand Singh	CPI	5,066	19.10	10,970	41.35
35	Nakodar	Umaro Singh	INC	13,200	50.62	Hari Dass	BSP	9,175	35.19	4,025	15.43
36	Nur Mahal	Gurbinder Singh Atwal	INC	12,749	33.49	Kulwant Singh Sandhu	CPI(M)	12,505	32.85	244	0.64
37	Banga (SC)	Satnam Singh Kainth	BSP	14,272	41.03	Doger Ram	INC	12,042	34.62	2,230	6.41
38	Nawan Shahr	Dilbagh Singh	INC	25,191	48.03	Darshan Ram	BSP	17,849	34.03	7,342	14.00
39	Phillaur (SC)	Santokh Singh Chaudhary	INC	11,787	42.48	Dev Raj Sandhu	BSP	10,333	37.24	1,454	5.24
40	Bholath	Jagtar Singh	INC	2,865	65.47	Roop Singh	BSP	649	14.83	2,216	50.64
41	Kapurthala	Gulzar Singh	INC	10,710	43.76	Hira Lal Dhir	BJP	8,652	35.35	2,058	8.41
42	Sultanpur	Gurmail Singh	INC	16,382	43.21	Sadhu Singh	IND	12,853	33.90	3,529	9.31
43	Phagwara (SC)	Joginder Singh Mann	INC	14,363	36.27	Swarna Ram	BJP	13,643	34.45	720	1.82
44	Balachaur	Hargopal Singh	BSP	15,696	32.59	Nand Lal	IND	12,468	25.89	3,228	6.70
45	Garhshankar	Shangara Ram	BSP	15,390	35.48	Kamal Singh	INC	8,564	19.74	6,826	15.74
46	Mahilpur (SC)	Avtar Singh Karimpuri	BSP	12,030	51.13	Param Jit Singh	INC	6,456	27.44	5,574	23.69
47	Hoshiarpur	Naresh	INC	14,558	28.13	Baldev Sahai	BJP	13,931	26.92	627	1.21
48	Sham Chaurasi (SC)	Gurpal Chand	BSP	13,168	51.70	Hari Mittar	INC	9,449	37.10	3,719	14.60
49	Tanda	Surjit Kaur	INC	11,195	50.49	Sukhwinder Kaur Saini	BSP	6,892	31.08	4,303	19.41
50	Garhdiwala (SC)	Dharam Pal Sabharwal	INC	11,484	44.08	Des Raj Dhugga	BSP	9,171	35.20	2,313	8.88
51	Dasuya	Romesh Chander	INC	20,957	46.27	Dial Singh	BSP	8,951	19.76	12,006	26.51
52	Mukerian	Kewal Krishan	INC	19,169	31.26	Janak Singh	BJP	15,853	25.85	3,316	5.41
53	Jagraon	Darshan Singh	INC	8,190	64.69	Ayudhia Prakash	BJP	2,649	20.92	5,541	43.77
54	Raikot	Nirmal Singh	INC	4,325	60.51	Bachitter Singh	SAD	2,822	39.49	1,503	21.02
55	Dakha (SC)	Malkiat Singh	INC	4,404	66.57	Ghanaya Lal	BJP	1,225	18.52	3,179	48.05
56	Qila Raipur	Tarsem Lal	CPI(M)	1,906	46.54	Gurdev Singh	INC	1,135	27.72	771	18.82
57	Ludhiana North	Rakesh Kumar Panday	INC	32,033	57.17	Harish Kumar	BJP	20,187	36.03	11,846	21.14
58	Ludhiana West	Harnam Dass Johar	INC	15,036	45.35	Kailash Sharma	BJP	10,550	31.82	4,486	13.53
59	Ludhiana East	Satpaul Gosain	BJP	16,619	48.15	Rajinder Saini	INC	12,803	37.10	3,816	11.05
60	Ludhiana Rural	Malkit Singh Birmi	INC	13,586	47.42	Jarnial Singh	BSP	7,020	24.50	6,566	22.92
61	Payal	Harnek Singh	INC	8,081	47.32	Kartar Singh	CPI	6,772	39.65	1,309	7.67
62	Kum Kalan (SC)	Isher Singh	INC	5,405	70.13	Inderjit Singh	BSP	1,712	22.21	3,693	47.92
63	Samrala	Karam Singh	INC	7,920	55.47	Sohan Lal	BSP	5,046	35.34	2,874	20.13
64	Khanna (SC)	Shamsher Singh	INC	16,399	73.20	Mohinder Pal	BJP	2,776	12.39	13,623	60.81
65	Nangal	Madan Mohan	BJP	15,616	33.38	Mohinder Paul	CPI(M)	13,490	28.83	2,126	4.55
66	Anandpur Sahib-Ropar	Ramesh Dutt	BJP	11,699	35.40	Basant Singh	INC	8,232	24.91	3,467	10.49
67	Chamkaur Sahib (SC)	Shamsher Singh	INC	3,641	50.63	Gurmukh Singh	BSP	2,706	37.63	935	13.00
68	Morinda	Jag Mohan Singh	INC	7,714	67.83	Balbir Singh	BSP	1,299	11.42	6,415	56.41
69	Kharar	Harnek Singh	INC	4,551	49.56	Man Singh	BSP	3,043	33.14	1,508	16.42
70	Banur	Mohinder Singh Gill	INC	13,756	33.25	Kanwaljit Singh	SAD	11,142	26.93	2,614	6.32
71	Rajpura	Raj Kumar Khurana	INC	18,876	62.47	Ram Chand	BJP	4,942	16.36	13,934	46.11
72	Ghanaur	Jasjit Singh	INC	8,746	35.76	Balwant Singh	CPI(M)	5,196	21.24	3,550	14.52
73	Dakala	Lal Singh	INC	11,010	46.66	Ram Lal	IND	9,508	40.30	1,502	6.36
74	Shutrana (SC)	Hamir Singh	INC	7,025	43.69	Nirmal Singh	SAD	3,968	24.68	3,057	19.01
75	Samana	Amarinder Singh	SAD	Won Unopposed							
76	Patiala Town	Brahm Mohinder	INC	13,135	36.01	Krishna Kumar	IND	11,663	31.97	1,472	4.04
77	Nabha	Ramesh Kumar	IND	12,082	30.52	Satinder Kaur	INC	9,549	24.12	2,533	6.40
78	Amloh (SC)	Sadhu Singh	INC	8,500	63.22	Dalip Singh Pandhi	SAD	3,039	22.60	5,461	40.62
79	Sirhind	Harbans Lal	BJP	6,981	44.02	Bir Devinder Singh	INC	6,573	41.45	408	2.57
80	Dhuri	Dhanwant Singh	INC	4,164	35.21	Bhan Singh Bhora	CPI	2,640	22.32	1,524	12.89
81	Malerkotla	Abdul Ghaffar	INC	14,271	43.04	Ashoo Tosh	BJP	7,967	24.03	6,304	19.01
82	Sherpur (SC)	Raj Singh	BSP	1,693	42.66	Sher Singh Pharwahi	CPI(M)	1,173	29.55	520	13.11
83	Barnala	Som Dutt	INC	4,289	47.56	Malkit Singh	SAD	3,473	38.51	816	9.05
84	Bhadaur (SC)	Nirmal Singh Nimma	BSP	1,040	45.96	Bachan Singh	INC	859	37.96	181	8.00
85	Dhanaula	Manjit Singh	INC	2,538	47.05	Gobind Singh	SAD	1,350	25.03	1,188	22.02
86	Sangrur	Jasbir Singh	INC	8,978	42.48	Ranjit Singh	SAD	6,227	29.47	2,751	13.01
87	Dirbha	Gurharan Singh	INC	3,072	39.92	Baldev Singh	SAD	2,624	34.10	448	5.82
88	Sunam	Bhagwan Dass	INC	5,727	41.56	Sanmukh Singh	SAD	4,046	29.36	1,681	12.20
89	Lehra	Rajinder Kaur	INC	16,369	60.32	Barinder Kumar	BJP	5,704	21.02	10,665	39.30
90	Balluana (SC)	Babu Ram S/o Ram Karan	INC	17,192	46.50	Satish Kumar	BSP	7,102	19.21	10,090	27.29
91	Abohar	Sajjan Kumar	INC	38,211	55.38	Arjan Singh	BJP	14,107	20.44	24,104	34.94
92	Fazilka	Moinder Kumar	IND	20,322	33.76	Sohan Lal	BJP	14,044	23.33	6,278	10.43
93	Jalalabad	Hans Raj	INC	18,105	24.63	Sucha Singh	BSP	15,217	20.70	2,888	3.93
94	Guru Har Sahai	Sajwar Singh	INC	18,348	30.86	Iqbal Singh	IND	18,028	30.32	320	0.54
95	Firozepur	Bal Mukand	INC	12,513	27.19	Mukhitiar Singh	BSP	12,158	26.42	355	0.77
96	Firozepur Cantt.	Ravinder Singh	IND	17,891	43.37	Gurnaib Singh	INC	16,345	39.63	1,546	3.74
97	Zira	Inder Jit Singh	SAD	16,422	50.64	Harcharan Singh	INC	8,479	26.14	7,943	24.50
98	Dharamkot (SC)	Baldev Singh	BSP	5,753	40.88	Piara Singh	INC	4,429	31.47	1,324	9.41
99	Moga	Malti	INC	7,865	30.78	Sathi Rup Lal	JD	7,858	30.75	7	0.03
100	Bagha Purana	Vijay Kumar	JD	3,615	31.44	Gur Charan Singh	INC	3,607	31.37	8	0.07
101	Nihal Singh Wala (SC)	Ajaib Singh	CPI	7,816	78.86	Sewak Singh	BSP	1,279	12.90	6,537	65.96
102	Panjgrain (SC)	Gurcharan Singh	INC	1,669	42.58	Jagir Singh	BSP	1,593	40.64	76	1.94
103	Kot Kapura	Upinder Kumar	INC	17,382	57.20	Narinder Singh	BSP	5,555	18.28	11,827	38.92
104	Faridkot	Avtar Singh	INC	15,823	50.58	Gurjant Singh	BSP	10,667	34.10	5,156	16.48
105	Muktsar	Har Charan Singh	INC	21,500	44.08	Avtar Singh	SAD	15,323	31.42	6,177	12.66
106	Giddar Baha	Raghubir Singh	INC	17,561	57.26	Raj Pal	BSP	6,524	21.27	11,037	35.99
107	Malout (SC)	Baldev Singh	UCPI	14,442	36.96	Shiv Chand	INC	9,475	24.25	4,967	12.71
108	Lambi	Gurnam Singh Abul Khurana	INC	16,170	63.33	Notej Singh	BSP	7,071	27.69	9,099	35.64
109	Talwandi Sabo	Harminder Singh	INC	4,209	46.58	Jagdeep Singh	BSP	3,217	35.60	992	10.98
110	Pakka Kalan (SC)	Baldev Singh	INC	7,674	50.10	Bhola Singh	CPI	3,970	25.92	3,704	24.18
111	Bhatinda	Surinder Kapoor	INC	17,192	43.30	Joginder Singh	CPI	11,312	28.49	5,880	14.81
112	Nathana (SC)	Gulzar Singh	INC	3,014	45.17	Jasmel Singh	SAD	2,317	34.72	697	10.45
113	Rampura Phul	Harbans Singh	INC	11,702	65.34	Mangu Singh	BSP	3,736	20.86	7,966	44.48
114	Joga	Surjan Singh	IPF	394	38.70	Teja Singh	SAD	289	28.39	105	10.31
115	Mansa	Sher Singh	INC	6,137	36.21	Buta Singh	CPI	6,101	36.00	36	0.21
116	Budhlada	Hardev Singh	CPI	9,034	48.63	Gurdev Singh	INC	6,455	34.75	2,579	13.88
117	Sardulgarh	Kirpal Singh	INC	4,116	64.74	Bakhsish Singh	CPI(M)	1,724	27.12	2,392	37.62

== Bypolls 1992-1996 ==
Date	Constituency	Previous MLA		Elected MLA	
1994	Ajnala	Harcharn Singh	Indian National Congress	Rattan Singh	Independent politician
1994	Nakodar	Umaro Singh	Indian National Congress	A.S. Samra	Indian National Congress
1995	Gidderbaha	Raghbir Singh	Indian National Congress	Manpreet Singh Badal	Shiromani Akali Dal

== See also ==
- Politics of Punjab, India
