= Attari Assembly constituency =

Legislative Assembly constituency in Punjab State, India

Coordinates: 31.6°N 74.6°E

Attari
- Constituency No. 20 for the Punjab Legislative Assembly

Constituency details
- Country: India
- State: Punjab
- District: Amritsar
- Lok Sabha constituency: Amritsar
- Total electors: 189,475 (in 2022)
- Reservation: SC

Member of Legislative Assembly
- 16th Punjab Legislative Assembly
- Incumbent ADC Jaswinder Singh
- Party: Aam Aadmi Party
- Elected year: 2022

Attari is a Punjab Legislative Assembly constituency in Amritsar district, Punjab state, India.

== Members of the Legislative Assembly ==
Most successful parties from Attari Vidhan Sabha
1. SAD (5 Times) (38.5%)
2. INC (4 Times) (30.8%)
3. CPI (M) (3 Times) (23.1%)
4. AAP (1 Time) (7.69%)

Year	Member	Party
1967	S. Singh	Indian National Congress
1969	Darshan Singh	Communist Party of India (Marxist)
1972	Gurdit Singh	Indian National Congress
1977	Darshan Singh	Communist Party of India (Marxist)
1980	Darshan Singh	Communist Party of India (Marxist)
1985	Tara Singh	Shiromani Akali Dal
1992	Sukhdev Singh Shehbazpuri	Indian National Congress
1997	Gulzar Singh Ranike	Shiromani Akali Dal
2002	Gulzar Singh Ranike	Shiromani Akali Dal
2007	Gulzar Singh Ranike	Shiromani Akali Dal
2012	Gulzar Singh Ranike	Shiromani Akali Dal
2017	Tarsem Singh D.C.	Indian National Congress
2022	Jaswinder Singh	Aam Aadmi Party

== Election results ==
Vote share of Winning candidates
2022	44.32%
2017	42.53%
2012	49.95%
2002	62.92%
1997	75.58%
1992	51.85%
1985	54.90%
1980	57.51%
1977	52.71%

=== 2027 ===
Punjab Assembly election, 2027: Attari
Party	Candidate	Votes	%	±%
AAP				
AD (WPD)				New entry
INC				
BSP				
SAD				
BJP				
NOTA	None of the above			
Majority				
Turnout				

=== 2022 ===
2022 Punjab Legislative Assembly election: Attari
Party	Candidate	Votes	%	±%
AAP	Jaswinder Singh	56,798	44.32	
SAD	Gulzar Singh Ranike	37,004	28.88	
INC	Tarsem Singh Sialka	26,204	20.45	
BJP	Balwinder Kaur	2,548	1.99	
NOTA	None of the above	1,381	1.08	
IND	3 Independent Candidates	2,448	1.91	
OTH	6 Other Party Candidates	1,762	1.38	
Majority		19,794	15.44	
Turnout		128,145	67.25	
AAP gain from INC		Swing		

=== 2017 ===
2017 Punjab Legislative Assembly election: Attari
Party	Candidate	Votes	%	±%
INC	D. C. Tarsem Singh	55,335	42.53	
SAD	Gulzar Singh Ranike	45,133	34.69	
AAP	Jaswinder Singh Jahangir	22,558	17.34	
CPI	Gurdeep Singh	2,581	1.98	
BSP	Sukhwantjit Kaur	1,088	0.84	
NOTA	None of the above	900	0.69	
IND	Mangat Singh	426	0.33	
OTH	5 Other Party Candidates	2,097	1.61	
Majority		10,202	7.84	
Turnout		130,118	74.98	
INC gain from SAD		Swing		

=== 2012 ===
2012 Punjab Legislative Assembly election: Attari (SC)
Party	Candidate	Votes	%	±%
SAD	Gulzar Singh Ranike	56,112	49.95	
INC	D. C. Tarsem Singh	51,129	45.51	
PPoP	Gulzar Singh	3,295	2.93	
BSP	Bhajan Singh	1,804	1.61	
Majority		4,983	4.44	
Turnout		112,340	75.25	
SAD hold		Swing		

=== 2002 ===
2002 Punjab Legislative Assembly election: Attari (SC)
Party	Candidate	Votes	%	±%
SAD	Gulzar Singh Ranike	43,740	62.92	
INC	Rattan Singh	19,521	28.08	
BSP	Sukhwant Jit Kaur	2,193	3.15	
SAD(A)	Rajpinder Kaur	2,109	3.03	
BSP (A)	Puran Singh	868	1.25	
NCP	Gulzar Singh Khasa	773	1.11	
JD(S)	Surjit Singh	317	0.46	
Majority		24,219	34.84	
Turnout		69,535	63.29	
SAD hold		Swing		

=== 1997 ===
1997 Punjab Legislative Assembly election: Attari (SC)
Party	Candidate	Votes	%	±%
SAD	Gulzar Singh	52,134	75.58	
CPI	Sardul Singh	10,956	15.88	
BSP	Sukhwant Jit Kaur	5,509	7.99	
IND	Surjit Singh	382	0.55	
Majority		41,178	59.70	
Turnout		70,340	65.66	
SAD gain from INC		Swing		

=== 1992 ===
1992 Punjab Legislative Assembly election: Attari (SC)
Party	Candidate	Votes	%	±%
INC	Sukhdev Singh Shehbazpuri	2,722	51.85	
BSP	Kunwant Singh Mubaba	2,238	42.63	
SAD	Piara Singh Nag	290	5.52	
Majority		484	9.22	
Turnout		5,671	6.04	
INC gain from SAD		Swing		

=== 1985 ===
1985 Punjab Legislative Assembly election: Attari (SC)
Party	Candidate	Votes	%	±%
SAD	Tara Singh	22,503	54.90	
INC	Swarn Kaur	11,101	27.08	
CPI(M)	Darshan Singh Jhabal	5,028	12.27	
IND	Sucha Singh	851	2.08	
IND	Darshan Singh Dhand	849	2.07	
IND	Surjit Singh	380	0.93	
IND	Surinder Singh	279	0.68	
Majority		11,402	27.82	
Turnout		43,189	56.29	
SAD gain from CPI(M)		Swing		

=== 1980 ===
1980 Punjab Legislative Assembly election: Attari (SC)
Party	Candidate	Votes	%	±%
CPI(M)	Darshan Singh Chabal	22,447	57.51	
INC(I)	Gurdit Singh Atishbaj	13,884	35.57	
IND	Sampuran Singh	1,888	4.84	
JP(S)	Sarjit Singh	811	2.08	
Majority		8,563	21.94	
Turnout		39,554	55.56	
CPI(M) hold		Swing		

=== 1977 ===
1977 Punjab Legislative Assembly election: Attari (SC)
Party	Candidate	Votes	%	±%
CPI(M)	Darshan Singh	16,737	52.71	
INC	Gurdit Singh	12,064	37.99	
IND	Jagdish Chand	1,668	5.25	
IND	Mohinder Singh	794	2.50	
IND	Surjit Singh	489	1.54	
Majority		4,673	14.72	
Turnout		32,112	48.89	
CPI(M) win (new seat)				

== See also ==
- List of constituencies of the Punjab Legislative Assembly
- Amritsar district
