= Tikshan Sud =

Indian politician

Minister Local Bodies Government of Punjab
- In office 15 May 2011 – 14 March 2012
- Chief Minister: Prakash Singh Badal
- Preceded by: Manoranjan Kalia

Minister of Commerce & Industry Government of Punjab
- In office 15 May 2011 – 14 March 2012
- Chief Minister: Prakash Singh Badal
- Preceded by: Manoranjan Kalia

Minister of Medical Education Government of Punjab
- In office 2 March 2007 – 12 May 2011
- Chief Minister: Prakash Singh Badal

Minister of Labour Government of Punjab
- In office 2 March 2007 – 12 May 2011
- Chief Minister: Prakash Singh Badal

Minister of Parliamentary Affairs Government of Punjab
- In office 2 March 2007 – 14 March 2012
- Chief Minister: Prakash Singh Badal

Member of Punjab Legislative Assembly
- In office 1997–2012
- Preceded by: Naresh Thakur
- Succeeded by: Sunder Sham Arora
- Constituency: Hoshiarpur

Personal details
- Born: 19 September 1954 (age 72) Hoshiarpur, Punjab
- Party: Bharatiya Janata Party
- Education: Panjab University

Tikshan Sood (born 19 September 1954) is an Indian politician who was elected for three consecutive terms to the Punjab Legislative Assembly, India, as a Bharatiya Janata Party candidate.

== Early life and education ==
Tikshan Sud was born in Hoshiarpur district in Punjab, India. He was educated at Panjab University, from where he was awarded Bachelor of Science and Bachelor of Law degrees and also a Masters in Political Science. He married Rakesh Sud and has one son and two daughters and resides in Hoshiarpur.

== Political career ==
Sud was the Secretary of the Akhil Bhartiya Vidyarthi Parishad, Chandigarh from 1973 to 1976. In 1977, he became the President of the Akhil Bhartiya Vidyarthi Parishad, Hoshiarpur and presided up till 1980. Subsequently, he became the President of the Bharat Vikas Parishad, Hoshiarpur in 1983 and remained so up till 1990. He was the District President of BJP, Hoshiarpur from 1995 to 1997.

Elections contested

Year	Constituency	Votes polled (%)	Name of primary opponent	Political party of opponent	Votes polled by opponent (%)
1997	Hoshiarpur	49.37 (Won)	Mohinder Pal	Bahujan Samaj Party	21.69
2002	Hoshiarpur	32.53 (Won)	Naresh Thakur	Indian National Congress	32.11
2007	Hoshiarpur	44.52 (Won)	Charanjit Singh	Indian National Congress	39.78
2012	Hoshiarpur	42.24 (Lost)	Sunder Shyam Arora	Indian National Congress	47.95
2017	Hoshiarpur	31.43 (Lost)	Sunder Shyam Arora	Indian National Congress	40.55

Sud was elected as MLA from Hoshiarpur constituency in the 1997 Punjab state assembly election and was inducted as State Minister for Excise & Taxation in SAD-BJP alliance Government in Punjab formed in 2000.

Sud was re-elected as MLA from Hoshiarpur in the 2002 Punjab state assembly election and was inducted as BJP Group Leader in the Punjab legislative assembly and also became a member of the BJP National Executive. He was re-elected as MLA from Hoshiarpur in the 2007 Punjab state assembly election and was inducted as a Cabinet Minister for Parliamentary Affairs, Medical Education and Research, Forests and Wildlife Preservation wing of the Agriculture department and Labour. Sud held all these portfolios simultaneously.

Sud lost the 2012 Punjab state assembly election but he was appointed the Political Advisor to the Chief Minister of Punjab from 2013 to 2017. He lost again in Hoshiarpur in 2017 against the INC candidate and then in 2022 from the Aam Aadmi Party candidate too.
