= Hoshiarpur Assembly constituency =

Legislative Assembly constituency in Punjab State, India

Coordinates: 31.53°N 75.92°E

Hoshiarpur
- Constituency No. 43 for the Punjab Legislative Assembly

Constituency details
- Country: India
- State: Punjab
- District: Hoshiarpur
- Lok Sabha constituency: Hoshiarpur
- Total electors: 192,794 (in 2022)
- Reservation: None

Member of Legislative Assembly
- 16th Punjab Legislative Assembly
- Incumbent Brahm Shankar Jimpa
- Party: Aam Aadmi Party
- Elected year: 2022

Hoshiarpur Assembly constituency is one of the 117 Legislative Assembly constituencies of Punjab state in India. It is part of Hoshiarpur district.

== Members of the Legislative Assembly ==
Most successful parties from Hoshiarpur Vidhan Sabha
1. INC (8 Times) (44.4%)
2. BJP (3 Times) (16.7%)
3. SSP (2 Times) (11.1%)
4. AAP (1 Time) (5.56%)
5. IND (1 Time) (5.56%)
6. INC (I) (1 Time) (5.56%)
7. JP (1 Time) (5.56%)
8. SCF (1 Time) (5.56%)

Year	Member	Party
1952	Jagat Ram	Indian National Congress
1952	Guran Dass	Indian National Congress
1957	Balbir Singh	Independent
1957	Karam Chand	Scheduled Castes Federation
1962	Bal Krishan	Indian National Congress
1967	Balbir Singh	Samyukta Socialist Party
1969	Balbir Singh	Samyukta Socialist Party
1972	Kundan Singh	Indian National Congress
1977	Om Parkash	Janata Party
1980	Kundan Singh	Indian National Congress (Indira)
1985	Mohan Lal	Indian National Congress
1992	Naresh	Indian National Congress
1997	Tikshan Sud	Bharatiya Janta Party
2002	Tikshan Sud	Bharatiya Janta Party
2007	Tikshan Sud	Bharatiya Janta Party
2012	Sunder Sham Arora	Indian National Congress
2017	Sunder Sham Arora	Indian National Congress
2022	Brahm Shankar Jimpa	Aam Aadmi Party

== Election results ==
=== 2027 ===
Punjab Assembly election, 2027: Hoshiarpur
Party	Candidate	Votes	%	±%
AAP	Brahm Shankar Jimpa			
AD (WPD)				New entry
INC				
BSP				
SAD				New entry
BJP				
NOTA	None of the above			
Majority				
Turnout				

=== 2022 ===
Punjab Assembly election, 2022: Hoshiarpur
Party	Candidate	Votes	%	±%
AAP	Brahm Shankar Jimpa	51,112	39.96	▲17.66
INC	Sunder Sham Arora	37,253	29.13	▼11.47
BJP	Tikshan Sud	23,973	18.74	▼12.66
BSP	Virinder Singh Parhar	12,087	9.45	▲5.85
NOTA	None of the above	1,151	0.6	
Majority		13,859	10.83	
Turnout		127,907	66.19	▼3.71
Registered electors		192,794		
AAP gain from INC				

=== 2017 ===
Punjab Assembly election, 2017: Hoshiarpur
Party	Candidate	Votes	%	±%
INC	Sunder Sham Arora	49,951	40.6	▼7.3
BJP	Tikshan Sud	38,718	31.4	▼10.8
AAP	Paramjit Singh Sachdeva	27,481	22.3	New
BSP	Surinder Kumar	4,442	3.6	▼1.7
NOTA	None of the above	1,000	0.6	
Majority		11,233	9.2	
Turnout		122,179	69.9	▼1.8
Registered electors		176,163		

=== 2012 ===
Punjab Assembly election, 2012: Hoshiarpur
Party	Candidate	Votes	%	±%
INC	Sunder Sham Arora	52,104	47.9	
BJP	Tikshan Sud	45,896	42.2	
BSP	Onkar Singh Jhamat	5,714	5.3	
Majority		6,208	5.7	
Turnout		108,535	71.7	
Registered electors		151,428		

== See also ==
- List of constituencies of the Punjab Legislative Assembly
- Hoshiarpur district
