= Rakesh Pandey (Punjab politician) =

Indian politician

Personal details
- Born: 1955 (age 71) India
- Party: Indian National Congress
- Parent: Joginder Pal Pandey
- Occupation: Politician

Rakesh Pandey is a four-term MLA (Member of Legislative Assembly) of Punjab from Ludhiana North. Pandey is a member of Indian National Congress. Pandey was first elected to the seat in 1992. He lost the seat in the 2022 Punjab Legislative Assembly election to Madan Lal Bagga of Aam Aadmi Party.

He was born on 7 May 1955. His father Joginder Pal Pandey was a politician.

Rakesh Pandey entered active politics in 1987 as president, District Youth Congress Committee, Ludhiana, Punjab.
