= Aklia =

Aklia Aklia Akllia
- Village
- Nickname: intelligent people
- Location in Punjab, India Aklia (India)
- Coordinates: 30.181924°N 75.4009109°E
- Country: India
- State: Punjab
- District: Mansa
- Established: 06/12/1918
- Founder: Baba Aklia

Government
  - Type: Panchayati raj (India)
  - Body: Gram panchayat

Population
  - Total: 8,000

Languages
  - Official: Punjabi
- Time zone: UTC+5:30 (IST)
- Postal Index Number (PIN): 151510
- Website: villageinfo.in/punjab/mansa/mansa/aklia.html

Aklia (Village ID 36159) is a small village in the Mansa district of Punjab, India. The village is 24 kilometers from the cities of Mansa and Barnala. There are three gurdwaras situated in the village, as well as a temple and a mosque. According to the 2011 census it has a population of 15786 living in 1571 households. Its main agriculture product is paddy growing.
