= Qila Raipur Assembly constituency =

Former constituency of the Punjab Legislative Assembly

Coordinates: 30.76°N 75.82°E

Qila Raipur
- Former constituency No. 56 for the Punjab Legislative Assembly

Constituency details
- Country: India
- State: Punjab
- District: Ludhiana
- Lok Sabha constituency: Ludhiana
- Established: 1972
- Abolished: 2012
- Total electors: 129,528 (2007)
- Reservation: None

Qila Raipur was a Punjab Legislative Assembly constituency till 2012. It was also won by then Punjab Chief Minister in 1997.

== Members of the Legislative Assembly ==
Year	Member	Party
1972	Arjan Singh	Shiromani Akali Dal
1977	Arjan Singh	Shiromani Akali Dal
1980	Arjan Singh	Shiromani Akali Dal
1985	Arjan Singh	Shiromani Akali Dal
1992	Tarsem Jodhan	Communist Party of India
1997	Parkash Singh Badal	Shiromani Akali Dal
2002	Jagdish Singh Garcha	Shiromani Akali Dal
2007	Jasbir Singh Khangura	Indian National Congress

== Election results ==
=== 2007 ===
Punjab Assembly election, 2007: Qila Raipur
Party	Candidate	Votes	%	±%
INC	Jasbir Singh Khangura	56,610	53.41	▲18.71
SAD	Jagdish Singh Garcha	45,734	43.14	▲0.89
BSP	Jaswant Singh	1,456	1.37	▼6.84
Independent	Maan Singh	805	0.76	
CPI(ML)L	Shinder Singh	551	0.52	
Independent	Pupinder Singh	513	0.48	
Independent	Dharamjit Singh	224	0.21	
Independent	Tarsem Lal Khosla	108	0.10	
Majority		10,876	10.27	▲2.72
Turnout		106,001	81.84	▲13.66
Registered electors		129,523		
INC gain from SAD		Swing	18.82	

=== 2002 ===
Punjab Assembly election, 2002: Qila Raipur
Party	Candidate	Votes	%	±%
SAD	Jagdish Singh Garcha	36,849	42.25	▼2.49
INC	Gurdial Kaur Khangura	30,270	34.70	▲29.22
SAD(A)	Mahesh Inder Singh Grewal	8,385	9.61	▼8.24
BSP	Jarnail Singh	7,163	8.21	
Independent	Tarsem Lal Jodhan	3,574	4.10	
Independent	Kuldip Singh	455	0.52	
Independent	Jasvir Singh	372	0.43	
Independent	Gurdial Singh	157	0.18	
Majority		6,579	7.55	▼5.26
Turnout		87,225	68.18	▼3.36
Registered electors		127,935		
SAD hold		Swing	1.80	

=== 1997 ===
Punjab Assembly election, 1997: Qila Raipur
Party	Candidate	Votes	%	±%
SAD	Parkash Singh Badal	38,532	44.74	New entry
CPI(M)	Tarsem Jodhan	27,500	31.93	▼14.61
SAD(A)	Simranjit Singh Mann	15,377	17.85	
INC	Jagdev Singh Jassowal	4,716	5.48	▼22.24
Majority		11,032	12.81	▼6.01
Turnout		86,125	71.54	▲67.70
Registered electors		120,385		
SAD gain from CPI(M)		Swing	13.41	

=== 1992 ===
Punjab Assembly election, 1992: Qila Raipur
Party	Candidate	Votes	%	±%
CPI(M)	Tarsem Lal	1,906	46.54	
INC	Gurdev Singh	1,135	27.72	▼4.86
BSP	Balvir Singh	832	20.32	
Independent	Gurbir Singh	222	5.42	
Majority		771	18.82	▼7.78
Turnout		4,095	3.84	▼57.23
Registered electors		111,288		
CPI(M) gain from SAD		Swing		

=== 1985 ===
Punjab Assembly election, 1985: Qila Raipur
Party	Candidate	Votes	%	±%
SAD	Arjan Singh	32,696	59.18	▲12.70
INC	Pushipinder Kaur	18,000	32.58	▼12.26
Independent	Ravinder Kaur	4,556	8.25	
Majority		14,696	26.60	▲24.96
Turnout		55,252	61.07	▲3.60
Registered electors		93,383		
SAD hold		Swing	12.48	

=== 1980 ===
Punjab Assembly election, 1980: Qila Raipur
Party	Candidate	Votes	%	±%
SAD	Arjan Singh	24,554	46.48	▼9.73
INC(I)	Gurbir Singh	23,686	44.84	
Independent	Harbans Singh	4,478	8.48	
Independent	Balbir Singh	109	0.21	
Majority		868	1.64	▼10.78
Turnout		52,827	57.47	▼2.17
Registered electors		91,921		
SAD hold		Swing		

=== 1977 ===
Punjab Assembly election, 1977: Qila Raipur
Party	Candidate	Votes	%	±%
SAD	Arjan Singh	28,694	56.21	▲9.74
Independent	Anil Partap	22,354	43.79	
Majority		6,340	12.42	▲9.59
Turnout		51,048	59.64	▼9.95
Registered electors		85,596		
SAD hold		Swing		

=== 1972 ===
Punjab Assembly election, 1972: Qila Raipur
Party	Candidate	Votes	%	±%
SAD	Arjan Singh	25,459	46.47	
SAD	Jagdev Singh	23,906	43.64	
Independent	Anil Partap	4,478	8.17	
RPI	Gurbachan Singh	943	1.72	
Majority		1,553	2.83	
Turnout		54,786	69.59	
Registered electors		78,725		
