= Jagat Ram Soondh =

Indian politician

Jagat Ram Soondh was a leader of Indian National Congress from Punjab, India. He was a member of Punjab Legislative Assembly and a minister. He was shot dead by militants in 1988.
