= Raj Kumar Gupta (Indian politician) =

Indian politician (died 2020)

Punjab Legislative Assembly
- In office 2002–2007
- Preceded by: Manoranjan Kalia
- Succeeded by: Manoranjan Kalia
- Constituency: Jullundur Central

Personal details
- Born: c. 1935
- Died: 11 February 2020 (aged 85)
- Party: Indian National Congress

Raj Kumar Gupta (c. 1935 – 11 February 2020) was an Indian politician from Punjab belonging to Indian National Congress. He was a legislator of the Punjab Legislative Assembly. He also served as the chairman of Punjab Small Industries and Export Corporation.

== Biography ==
Gupta was elected as a member of the Punjab Legislative Assembly from Jullundur Central in 2002. He was not nominated from Indian National Congress in 2007. After this incident he joined Bharatiya Janata Party. He returned to Indian National Congress in 2010.

Gupta died on 11 February 2020 at the age of 85.
