= Dakala =

Village in Punjab, India

- Village
- Location in Punjab, India Dakala (India)
- Coordinates: 30.219525°N 76.353778°E
- Country: India
- State: Punjab
- District: Patiala district
- Talukas: Patiala

Area
  - Total: 10.48 km^{2} (4.05 sq mi)

Population (2011)
  - Total: 4,594
  - Density: 438.4/km^{2} (1,135/sq mi)

Languages
  - Official: Punjabi (Gurmukhi)
  - Regional: Punjabi
- Time zone: UTC+5:30 (IST)
- Vehicle registration: PB11
- Nearest city: Patiala

Dakala sometimes spelled as Dakaala (Gurmukhi: ਡਕਾਲਾ) is a village in the Patiala Block of Patiala district in Punjab, India.

== Geography ==
Dakala is located at 30.219525°N 76.353778°E in the Patiala district of Indian Punjab. Sanaur is the nearest town to Dakala for all economic activities.

== Demographics ==
As per 2011 census, the village has total population of 4594 with 841 households, of which 52.45% are males (2410) and 47.55% are females (2184). Though residents have now started sending their daughters to schools, still only 55.04% of females are educated as compared to 64.61% of males. The overall literacy rate of the village is 60.06%. The Punjabi is the major language spoken by all in the village.

== Education ==
There is a Govt. Senior Secondary School in Dakala.
