= Sherpur, Punjab =

Sherpur
- Village
- Location in Punjab, India Sherpur (India)
- Coordinates: 31.0423812°N 75.586152°E
- Country: India
- State: Punjab
- District: Jalandhar

Government
  - Type: Panchayat raj
  - Body: Gram panchayat
- Elevation: 240 m (790 ft)

Population (2011)
  - Total: 1,152
- Sex ratio 586/566 ♂/♀

Languages
  - Official: Punjabi
- Time zone: UTC+5:30 (IST)
- PIN: 144039
- ISO 3166 code: IN-PB
- Vehicle registration: PB- 08
- Website: jalandhar.nic.in

Sherpur is a village in Jalandhar district of Punjab State, India. It is located 7.4 km from Nurmahal, 24.8 km from Phillaur, 36.3 km from district headquarter Jalandhar and 135 km from state capital Chandigarh. The village is administrated by a sarpanch who is an elected representative of village as per Panchayati raj (India).

== Transport ==
Jagraon railway station is the nearest train station however, Jagraon station train station is 5 km away from the village. The village is near about 50 km away from domestic airport in Ludhiana and the nearest international airport is located in Chandigarh also Sri Guru Ram Dass Jee International Airport is the second nearest airport Amritsar.
