= Talwandi Sabo Assembly constituency =

Legislative Assembly constituency in Punjab State, India

Coordinates: 29.99°N 75.08°E

Talwandi Sabo
- Constituency No. 94 for the Punjab Legislative Assembly

Constituency details
- Country: India
- State: Punjab
- District: Bathinda
- Lok Sabha constituency: Bathinda
- Total electors: 157,176
- Reservation: None

Member of Legislative Assembly
- 16th Punjab Legislative Assembly
- Incumbent Baljinder Kaur
- Party: Aam Aadmi Party
- Elected year: 2017

Talwandi Sabo Assembly constituency (Sl. No.: 94) is a Punjab Legislative Assembly constituency in Bathinda district, Punjab state, India.

== Members of Legislative Assembly ==
Most successful parties from Talwandi Sabo Vidhan Sabha
1. INC (7 Times) (43.8%)
2. SAD (4 Times) (25.0%)
3. AAP (2 Times) (12.5%)
4. AD – SFS (1 Time) (6.25%)
5. CPI (1 Time) (6.25%)
6. INC (I) (1 Time) (6.25%)

Year	Member	Party
1962	Jangir Singh	Communist Party of India
1967	D. Singh	Akali Dal – Sant Fateh Singh Group
1969	Ajit Singh	Indian National Congress
1972	Sukhdev Singh	Shiromani Akali Dal
1977	Sukhdev Singh	Shiromani Akali Dal
1980	Avtar Singh	Indian National Congress (Indira)
1985	Captain Amarinder Singh	Shiromani Akali Dal
1992	Harminder Singh Jassi	Indian National Congress
1997	Harminder Singh Jassi	Indian National Congress
2002	Jeetmohinder Singh Sidhu	Indian National Congress
2007	Jeetmohinder Singh Sidhu	Indian National Congress
2012	Jeetmohinder Singh Sidhu	Indian National Congress
2014 (bypoll)	Jeetmohinder Singh Sidhu	Shiromani Akali Dal
2017	Baljinder Kaur	Aam Aadmi Party
2022	Baljinder Kaur	Aam Aadmi Party

== Election results ==
=== 2027 ===
Punjab Assembly election, 2027: Talwandi Sabo
Party	Candidate	Votes	%	±%
AAP	Baljinder Kaur			
AD (WPD)				New entry
INC				
BSP				
SAD				
BJP				
NOTA	None of the above			
Majority				
Turnout				

=== 2022 ===
Assembly election, 2022: Talwandi Sabo
Party	Candidate	Votes	%	±%
AAP	Baljinder Kaur	48,753	37.30	
SAD	Jeet mohinder Singh Sidhu	33,501	25.7	
INC	Khushbaz Singh Jatana	26,628	20.4	
Independent	Harminder Singh Jassi	12,623	9.7	
BJP	Ravi Preet Singh Sidhu	4,369	3.4	New entry
NOTA	None of the above	1,008	0.6	
Majority		15,252	11.58	
Turnout		131,606	83.7	
Registered electors		157,174		
AAP hold				

=== 2017 ===
2017 Punjab Legislative Assembly election: Talwandi Sabo
Party	Candidate	Votes	%	±%
AAP	Prof. Baljinder Kaur	54,553	42.67	
INC	Khushbaz Singh Jatana	35,260	27.58	
SAD	Jeetmohinder Singh Sidhu	34,473	26.96	
BSP	Harjinder Singh Mithan	1,346	1.05	
IND	Karamjit Singh	660	0.52	
SAD(A)	Avtar Singh Chopra	596	0.47	
NOTA	None of the above	578	0.45	
IND	Baljinder Singh	355	0.28	
IND	Darshan Singh	338	0.26	
APP	Varinder Singh Dhillon	267	0.21	
Majority		19,293	15.09	
Turnout		128,426	85.99	
AAP gain from INC		Swing		

== See also ==
- List of constituencies of the Punjab Legislative Assembly
- Bathinda district
