= Randeep Singh Nabha =

Indian politician

Randeep Singh
- Born: Randeep Singh Nabha; Nabha, Punjab, India.
- Height: 6'3
- Children: Barkat Singh and Sikander Singh
- Parent(s): Gurdrashan Singh (father), Satinder Kaur (mother)

Randeep Singh Nabha also known as Kaka Randeep Singh Nabha is an Indian politician and a leader of Indian National Congress. He is serving as Agriculture Minister in the Punjab Government. He is a MLA in Punjab Vidhan Sabha and represents Amloh 2012–2017.He is married to Behista who hails from Royal family of Afghanistan.
