= Manmohan Kalia =

Indian politician

Manmohan Kalia was a leader of Bharatiya Janata Party from Punjab, India. He was a member of Punjab Legislative Assembly elected from Jalandhar in 1967,1969,1977 and 1986. He served as minister in Government of Punjab, India in 1967 and 1970. He was imprisoned in the emergency for 19 months. He was killed in a road accident in 1986.
