= Rajinder Beri =

Indian politician

Personal details
- Born: 6 March 1962 (age 64) Jalandhar
- Party: Indian national congress
- Spouse: Smt. Uma Beri
- Profession: Politician/Businessman

Rajinder Beri (born 6 March 1962) is the President of the District Congress Committee Jalandhar. He was the councillor - Municipal Corporation Jalandhar for the terms 1997–2002 and 2007–2012.

== Positions held ==
1. 2017–2022 : Member of Legislative Assembly, Jalandhar Central
2. 2013–2017 : President District Congress Committee, Jalandhar
3. 2007–2012 : Councillor Municipal Corporation, Jalandhar
4. 2002–2007 : Trustee, Jalandhar Improvement Trust
5. 1997–2002 : Councillor Municipal Corporation, Jalandhar
6. 1996–1999 : General Secretary, Punjab Youth Congress
7. 1979–1981 : Vice president, NSUI

== Punjab Assembly Elections 2012 ==
Rajinder Beri contested Punjab Assembly elections in 2012 as a Congress candidate from Jalandhar Central Assembly constituency. He lost the elections by a margin of 1064 votes which was the minimum among all the Jalandhar urban constituencies. In 2017 Punjab Legislative Assembly elections, he won from the same constituency by the margin of over 25000 votes avenging his loss to Manoranjan Kalia.
