= Baldev Raj Chawla =

Indian politician (1938–2024)

Personal details
- Born: 17 January 1938; Punjab Province, British India
- Died: 17 January 2024 (aged 86); Ludhiana, Punjab, India
- Resting place: Durgiana Temple, Amritsar, Punjab, India
- Political party: Bharatiya Janata Party
- Occupation: Politician

Baldev Raj Chawla (17 January 1938 – 17 January 2024) was an Indian politician who was leader of the Bharatiya Janata Party from Punjab. He was a member of the Punjab Legislative Assembly. Chawla served as deputy speaker of the assembly and a cabinet minister in Government of Punjab. He also served as the Health Minister in the government of Parkash Singh Badal. Chawla died in Ludhiana on 17 January 2024, his 86th birthday.
