= Mansa, Punjab Assembly constituency =

Legislative Assembly constituency in Punjab State, India

Coordinates: 30°N 75.4°E

Mansa
- Constituency No. 96 for the Punjab Legislative Assembly

Constituency details
- Country: India
- State: Punjab
- District: Mansa
- Lok Sabha constituency: Bathinda
- Total electors: 219,264
- Reservation: None

Member of Legislative Assembly
- 16th Punjab Legislative Assembly
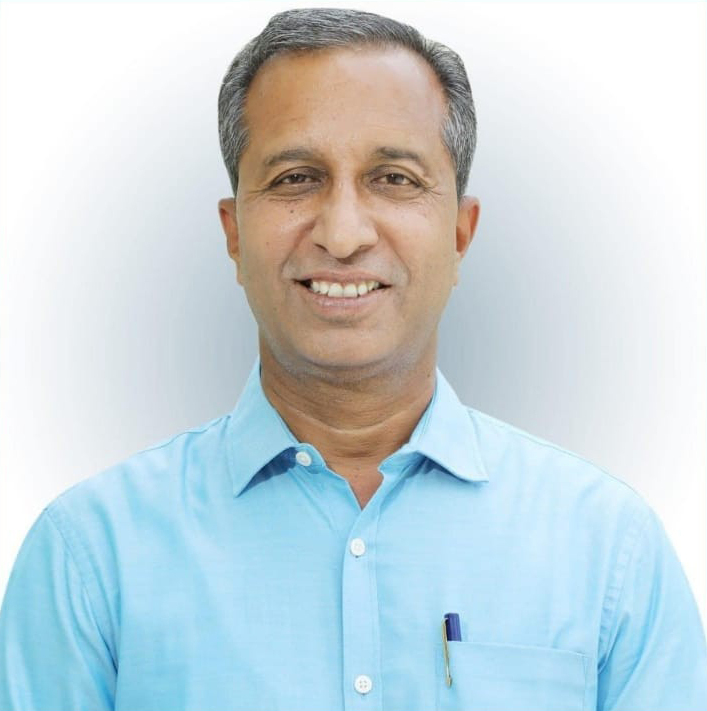
- Incumbent Vijay Singla
- Party: Aam Aadmi Party
- Elected year: 2022

Mansa Assembly constituency is one of the 117 Legislative Assembly constituencies of Punjab state in India. It is part of Mansa district.

== Members of the Legislative Assembly ==
Most successful parties from Mansa, Punjab Vidhan Sabha
1. SAD (7 Times) (36.8%)
2. CPI (4 Times) (21.1%)
3. INC (4 Times) (21.1%)
4. AAP (2 Times) (10.5%)
5. IND (1 Time) (5.26%)
6. JP (1 Time) (5.26%)

Year	Member	Party
As part of PEPSU Legislative Assembly (1951–56)
1952	Bali Singh	Shiromani Akali Dal
1952	Harchand Singh	Shiromani Akali Dal
1954	Jangir Singh	Communist Party of India
As part of Punjab Legislative Assembly (1956–Present)
1957	Kirpal Singh	Indian National Congress
1957	Harcharan Singh	Indian National Congress
1962	Surjit Singh	Shiromani Akali Dal
1967	Jangir Singh	Communist Party of India
1969	Sant Lakha Singh	Shiromani Akali Dal
1972	Jangir Singh	Communist Party of India
1977	Des Raj	Janata Party
1980	Buta Singh	Communist Party of India
1985	Jaswant Singh	Shiromani Akali Dal
1992	Sher Singh Gagowal	Indian National Congress
1997	Sukhwinder Singh Aulakh	Shiromani Akali Dal
2002	Sher Singh Gagowal	Independent politician
2007	Sher Singh Gagowal	Indian National Congress
2012	Prem Mittal	Shiromani Akali Dal
2017	Nazar Singh Manshahia	Aam Aadmi Party
2022	Vijay Singla	Aam Aadmi Party

== Election results ==
=== 2027 ===
Punjab Assembly election, 2027: Mansa
Party	Candidate	Votes	%	±%
AAP				
AD (WPD)				New entry
INC				
BSP				
SAD				
BJP				New entry
NOTA	None of the above			
Majority				
Turnout				

=== 2022 ===
Punjab Assembly election, 2022: Mansa
Party	Candidate	Votes	%	±%
AAP	Vijay Singla	100,023	57.57	▲
INC	Sidhu Moosewala	36,700	21.12	▼
SAD	Prem Arora	27,180	15.64	
SAD(A)	Rajinder Singh	4,089	2.35	
PLC	Jiwan Dass Bawa	1,734	1.0	
NOTA	None of the above	1,099	0.63	
Majority		63,323	36.45	
Turnout		173,756	79.25	
Registered electors		219,264		
AAP hold				

=== 2017 ===
Punjab Assembly election, 2017: Mansa
Party	Candidate	Votes	%	±%
AAP	Nazar Singh Manshahia	70,586	40.5	
INC	Manoj Bala	50,117	28.8	
SAD	Jagdeep Singh Nakai	44,232	25.4	
NOTA	None of the above	1,253	0.60	
Majority		20,469	11.8	
Turnout		173,073	84.3	
Registered electors		206,801		
AAP gain from SAD		Swing		

=== 2012 ===
Punjab Assembly election, 2012: Mansa
Party	Candidate	Votes	%	±%
SAD	Prem Mittal	55,714	37.53	
INC	Gurpreet Kaur	54,409	36.65	
CPI	Hardev Singh Arshi	30,487	20.53	
Majority		1305	0.88	
Turnout		148464	81.52	
Registered electors				
SAD gain from INC		Swing		

=== 2007 ===
Punjab Assembly election, 2007: Mansa
Party	Candidate	Votes	%	±%
INC	Sher Singh Gagowal			
SAD	Sukhwinder Singh Aulakh			
Majority				
Turnout				
Registered electors				
INC gain from Independent		Swing		

=== 2002 ===
Punjab Assembly election, 2002: Mansa
Party	Candidate	Votes	%	±%
Independent	Sher Singh Gagowal			
SAD	Sukhwinder Singh Aulakh			
INC				
Majority				
Turnout				
Registered electors				
Independent gain from SAD		Swing		

=== 1997 ===
1997 Punjab Legislative Assembly election: Mansa
Party	Candidate	Votes	%	±%
SAD	Sukhwinder Singh Aulakh			
INC				
Majority		1,786	1.9	
Turnout		95,613	70.2	
Registered electors		1,36,293		
SAD gain from INC				

=== 1992 ===
1992 Punjab Legislative Assembly election: Mansa
Party	Candidate	Votes	%	±%
INC	Sher Singh Gagowal			
SAD				
Majority				
Turnout				
Registered electors				
INC gain from		Swing		

== See also ==
- List of constituencies of the Punjab Legislative Assembly
- Mansa district, India
