= Gulzar Singh Ranike =

Indian politician

MLA, Punjab
- In office 1997 - 2017
- Preceded by: Sukhdev Singh Shehbazpuri
- Constituency: Attari

Minister for Sports & Youth Services
- In office 2007 - 2012
- Chief Minister: Parkash Singh Badal
- Preceded by: Capt. Amarinder Singh
- Succeeded by: Sukhbir Singh Badal

Minister for Welfare of SCs and BCs
- In office 2007 - 2017
- Chief Minister: Parkash Singh Badal
- Preceded by: Gurkanwal Kaur

Minister for Animal Husbandry, Dairy, Fisheries
- In office 2007 - 2017
- Chief Minister: Parkash Singh Badal
- Preceded by: Jagmohan Singh Kang

Personal details
- Born: 14 January 1958 (age 68) Ranike, Amritsar, India
- Party: Shiromani Akali Dal
- Children: 2 living and Ruhaniyat Jot Kaur (died 2006)
- Website: http://gulzarsinghranike.in

Gulzar Singh Ranike was a cabinet minister in the previous Punjab government and he belongs to the ruling Shiromani Akali Dal. He was Minister for Animal Husbandry, Dairy, Fisheries in that Government. He had been holding this post from 2012 to 2017. He is also President of Shiromani Akali Dal SC Wing.

== Personal life ==
He was born into Mazhabi Sikh family and his father was also a leader in Akali Dal.

== Political career ==
He started his political career in 1983 as a Sarpanch (Village chief) of Ranike. He was first elected for the Punjab Legislative Assembly in 1997 as an Akali Dal candidate from Attari. He was again re-elected in 2002, 2007 and 2012. In 2007 he was made Minister of Animal Husbandry, Dairy, Fisheries, Welfare of SCs and BCs, Sports & Youth Services. After 2012, he continued to be minister of Animal Husbandry, Dairy, Fisheries, Welfare of SC & BC, whereas portfolio of Sports & Youth Services was transferred to deputy Chief Minister Sukhbir Singh Badal.
