= Dhanaula Assembly constituency =

Former assembly constituency in Punjab, India

Coordinates: 30.28°N 75.57°E

Dhanaula
- Former constituency for the Punjab Legislative Assembly

Constituency details
- Country: India
- State: Punjab
- Lok Sabha constituency: Sangrur
- Established: 1972
- Abolished: 2012
- Total electors: 130,352 (2007)
- Reservation: None

Dhanaula Assembly constituency was one of the 117 assembly constituencies of Punjab, an Indian state, until it was abolished in 2012 delimitation.

== Member of Legislative Assembly ==
Election	Winner	Party
2007	Kuldip Singh Bhathal	Indian National Congress

== Election results ==
=== 2007 ===
Assembly election, 2007: Dhanaula
Party	Candidate	Votes	%	±%
INC	Kuldip Singh Bhathal	42,105		
SAD	Gobind Singh Longowal	38581		
SAD(A)	Simranjit Singh Mann	16303		
Independent	Rajwinder Kaur Rozzy Bhathal	5869		
BSP	Karnail Singh Dulet	3411		
CPI(ML)L	Labh Singh Aklia	1569		
Turnout		107838		
