= 2024 Indian general election in Punjab =

Elections for the 18th Lok Sabha seats in Punjab

- 1 June 2024

All 13 Punjab seats in the Lok Sabha
- Opinion polls
- Turnout: 62.80% (▼3.14 pp)
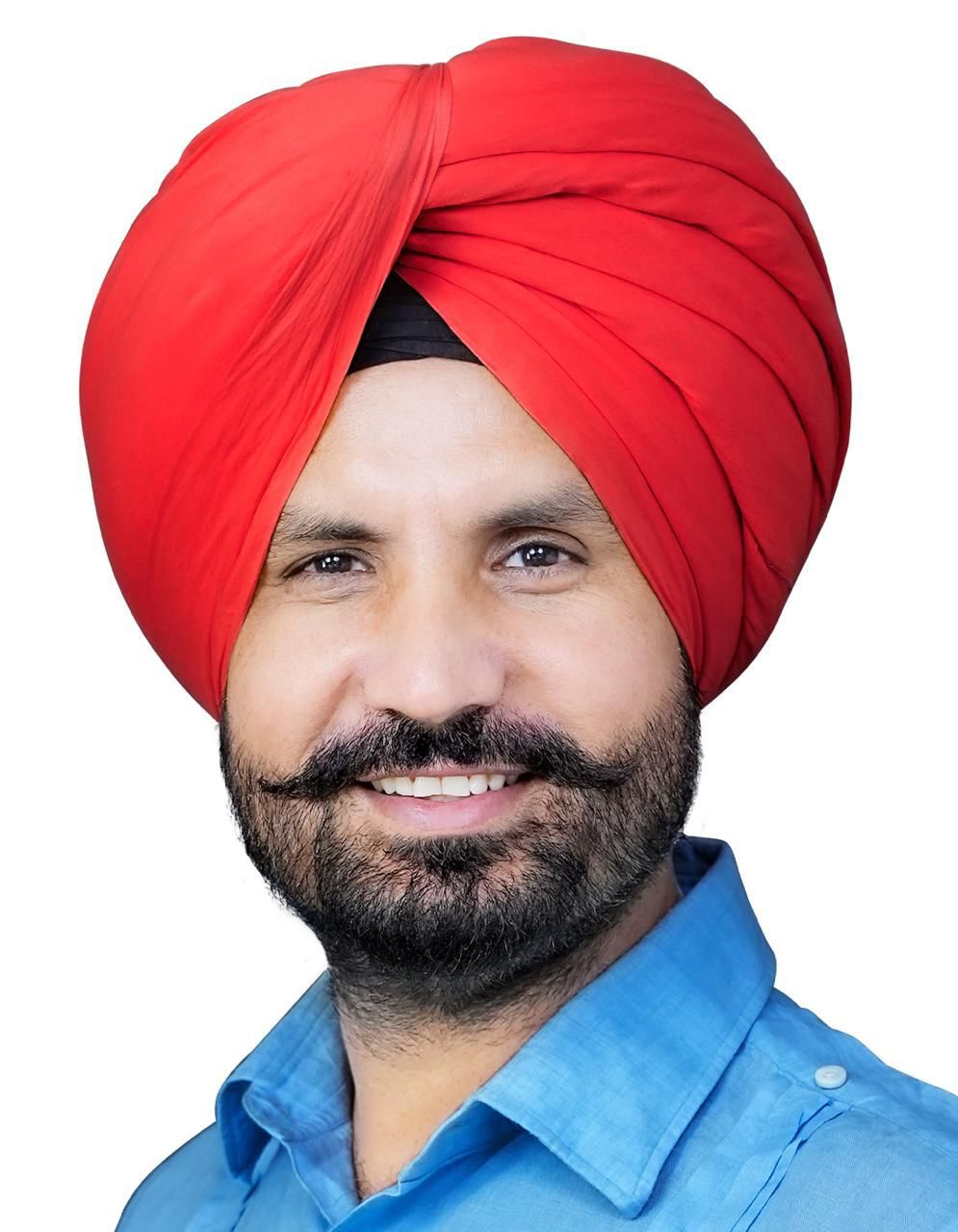

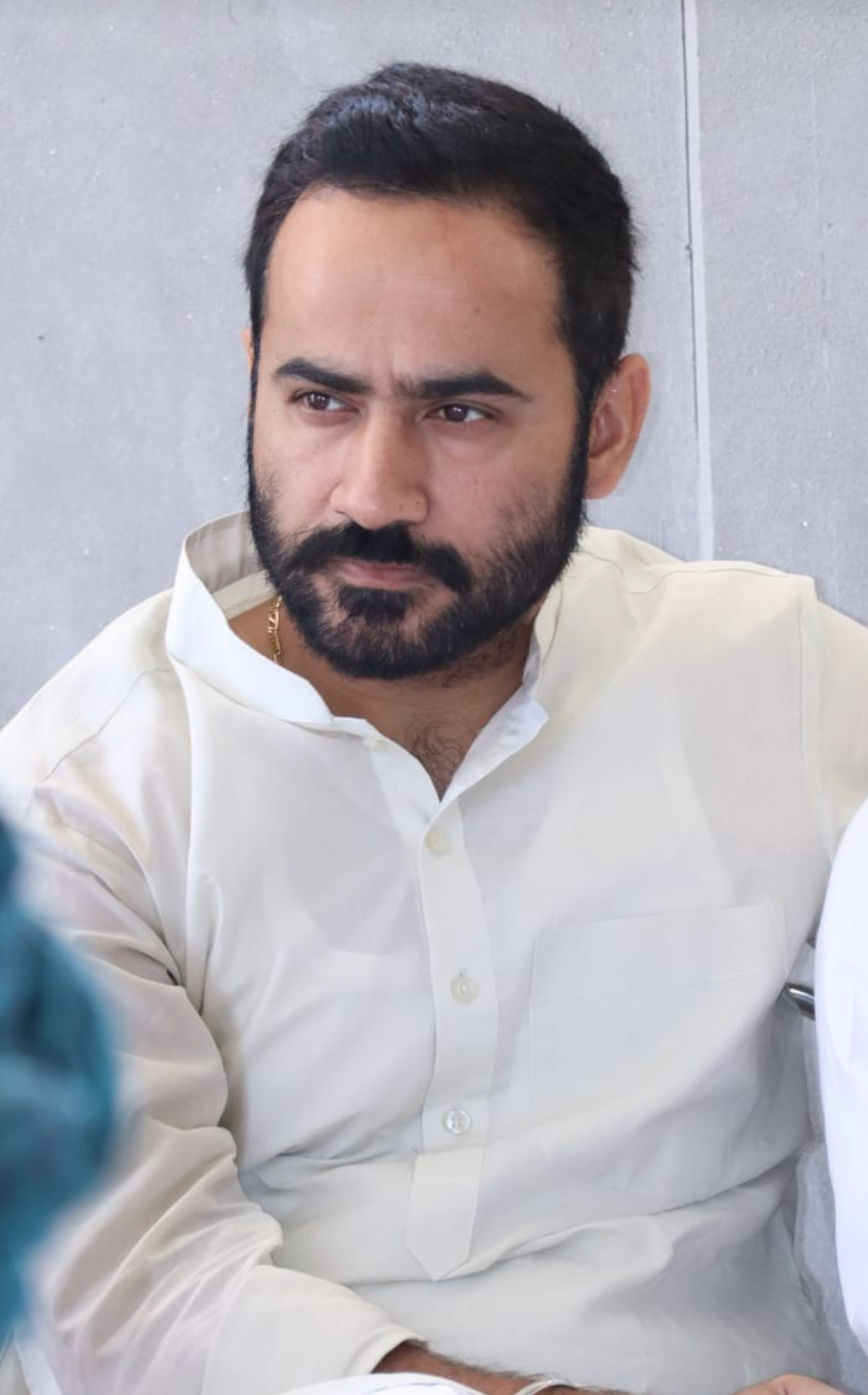

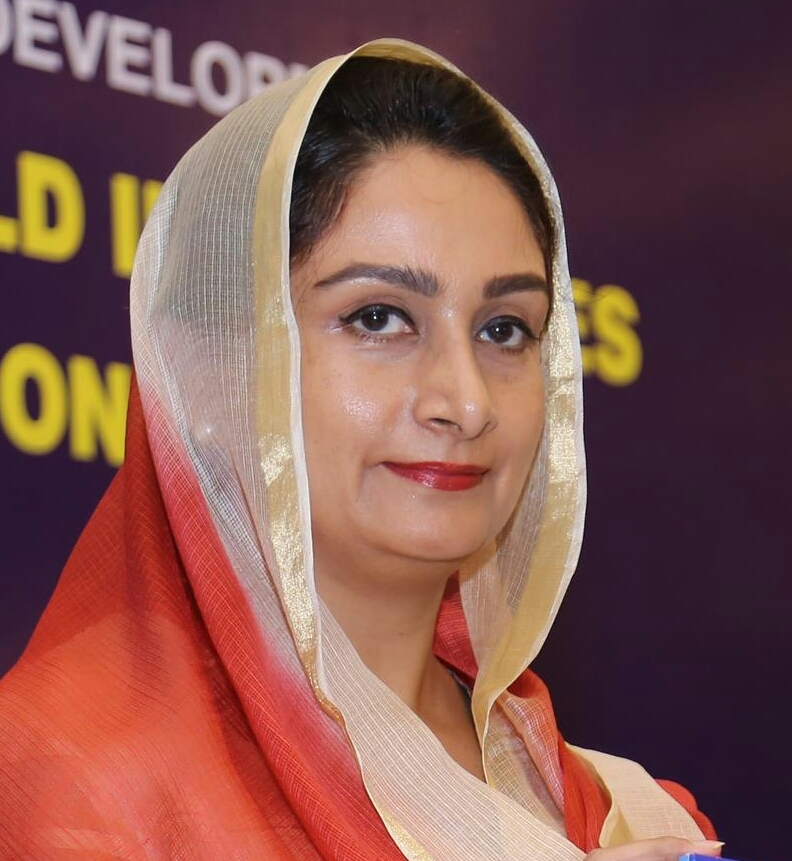

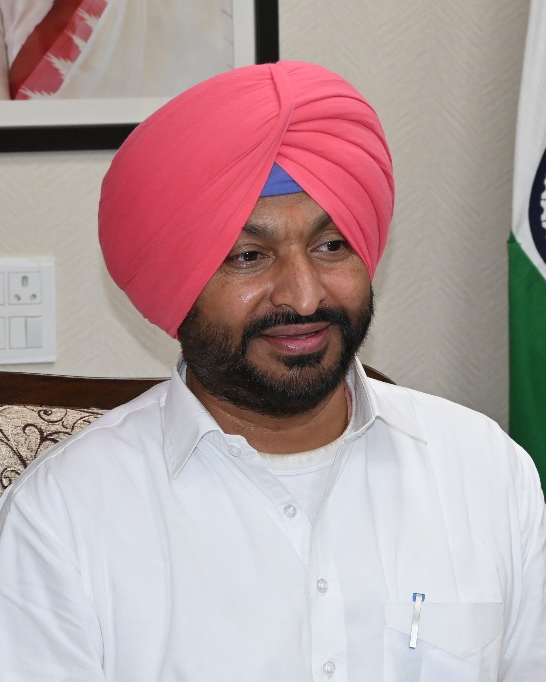
	First party	Second party
Leader	Amrinder Singh Raja Warring	Gurmeet Singh Meet Hayer
Party	INC	AAP
Alliance	INDIA	-
Leader since	2022	2024
Leader's seat	Ludhiana (Won)	Sangrur (Won)
Last election	40.12%, 8 seats	7.86%, 1 seat
Seats won	7	3
Seat change	▼1	▲2
Popular vote	3,543,824	3,506,939
Percentage	26.30%	26.02%
Swing	▼13.82 pp	▲18.64 pp
	Third party	Fourth party
Leader	Harsimrat Kaur Badal	Ravneet Singh Bittu
Party	SAD	BJP
Alliance	-	NDA
Leader since	2009	2024
Leader's seat	Bathinda (Won)	Ludhiana (Lost)
Last election	27.45%, 2 seats	9.63%, 2 seats
Seats won	1	0
Seat change	▼1	▼2
Popular vote	1,808,837	2,500,877
Percentage	13.42%	18.56%
Swing	▼14.34 pp	▲8.93 pp
Prime Minister before election
Narendra Modi
BJP
Prime Minister after election
Narendra Modi
BJP

The 2024 Indian general election was held in Punjab on 1 June 2024 to elect 13 members of the 18th Lok Sabha.

== Background and overview ==
The previous general election were held in May 2019 in Punjab, in which the Indian National Congress won 8 seats, followed by the Shiromani Akali Dal and the Bharatiya Janata Party, which won 2 seats each. In 2022, Bhagwant Mann resigned as MP from Sangrur to become Chief Minister of Punjab. A by-election for the constituency was held in June 2022, where Simranjit Singh Mann defeated Gurmail Singh of the incumbent Aam Aadmi Party. In January 2023, the Jalandhar constituency became vacant after the death of the incumbent MP, Santokh Singh Chaudhary of INC. In May 2023, Sushil Kumar Rinku of AAP defeated Karamjit Kaur of INC.

=== Defections ===
In March 2024, Raj Kumar Chabbewal and Gurpreet Singh GP of INC joined AAP, both were announced candidates from Hoshiarpur and Fatehgarh Sahib constituencies respectively. Patiala MP Preneet Kaur joined BJP. Sushil Rinku, who was announced as the AAP candidate for Jalandhar constituency, joined BJP, he was member of INC prior to AAP. Ravneet Singh Bittu, MP from Ludhiana, joined BJP. In April 2024, former MLA Pawan Kumar Tinu of SAD joined AAP, and was announced candidate for Jalandhar.

== Election schedule ==
The election schedule was announced by Election Commission of India on 16 March 2024. The elections are to be held in seven phases throughout the country, with Punjab in the last phase.

Poll event	Phase
Poll event	VII
Notification date	7 May
Last date for filing nomination	14 May
Scrutiny of nomination	15 May
Last Date for withdrawal of nomination	17 May
Date of poll	1 June
Date of counting of votes/Result	4 June 2024
No. of constituencies	13

== Parties and alliances ==
=== Indian National Congress ===
Indian National Congress

Party	Flag	Symbol	Leader	Seats contested
Indian National Congress			Amrinder Singh Raja Warring	13

=== Aam Aadmi Party ===
Aam Aadmi Party

Party	Flag	Symbol	Leader	Seats contested
Aam Aadmi Party			Bhagwant Mann	13

=== Shiromani Akali Dal ===
Shiromani Akali Dal

Party	Flag	Symbol	Leader	Seats contested
Shiromani Akali Dal			Sukhbir Singh Badal	13

=== National Democratic Alliance ===
National Democratic Alliance

Party	Flag	Symbol	Leader	Seats contested
Bharatiya Janata Party			Sunil Kumar Jakhar	13

=== Others ===
Party	Flag	Symbol	Leader	Seats contested
Shiromani Akali Dal (Amritsar)			Simranjit Singh Mann	12
Bahujan Samaj Party			Jasvir Singh Garhi	13
Communist Party of India (Marxist)			Purshottam Lal Bilga	1
Communist Party of India				3

== List of Candidates ==
Constituency		INC		AAP		SAD		BJP	
#	Name	Party	Candidate	Party	Candidate	Party	Candidate	Party	Candidate
1	Gurdaspur	INC	S. S. Randhawa	AAP	Amansher Singh	SAD	Daljit Singh Cheema	BJP	Dinesh Singh
2	Amritsar	INC	Gurjeet Singh Aujla	AAP	Kuldeep Singh Dhaliwal	SAD	Anil Joshi	BJP	Taranjit Singh Sandhu
3	Khadoor Sahib	INC	Kulbir Singh Zira	AAP	Laljit Singh Bhullar	SAD	Virsa Singh Valtoha	BJP	Manjit Singh Mianwind
4	Jalandhar (SC)	INC	Charanjit Singh Channi	AAP	Pawan Kumar Tinu	SAD	Mohinder Singh Kaypee	BJP	Sushil Kumar Rinku
5	Hoshiarpur (SC)	INC	Yamini Gomar	AAP	Raj Kumar Chabbewal	SAD	Sohan Singh Thandal	BJP	Anita Parkash
6	Anandpur Sahib	INC	Vijay Inder Singla	AAP	Malwinder Singh Kang	SAD	Prem Singh Chandumajra	BJP	Subhash Sharma
7	Ludhiana	INC	Amrinder Singh Warring	AAP	Ashok Parashar Pappi	SAD	Ranjit Singh Dhillon	BJP	Ravneet Singh Bittu
8	Fatehgarh Sahib (SC)	INC	Amar Singh	AAP	Gurpreet Singh GP	SAD	Bikramjit Singh Khalsa	BJP	Gejja Ram Valmiki
9	Faridkot (SC)	INC	Amarjit Kaur Sahoke	AAP	Karamjit Anmol	SAD	Rajwinder Singh	BJP	Hans Raj Hans
10	Firozpur	INC	Sher Singh Ghubaya	AAP	Jagdeep Singh Kaka Brar	SAD	Nardev Singh Mann	BJP	Rana Gurmit Singh
11	Bathinda	INC	Jeet Mohinder Singh Sidhu	AAP	Gurmeet Singh Khudian	SAD	Harsimrat Kaur Badal	BJP	Parampal Kaur Sidhu
12	Sangrur	INC	Sukhpal Singh Khaira	AAP	Gurmeet Singh Meet Hayer	SAD	Iqbal Singh Jhundan	BJP	Arvind Khanna
13	Patiala	INC	Dharamvir Gandhi	AAP	Balbir Singh	SAD	Narinder Kumar Sharma	BJP	Preneet Kaur

== Surveys and polls ==
=== Opinion polls ===
Polling agency	Date published	Margin of error					Lead
Polling agency	Date published	Margin of error	INDIA	NDA	SAD	Others	Lead
ABP News-CVoter	March 2024	±5%	11	1	1	0	INDIA
India Today-CVoter	February 2024	±3-5%	10	2	1	0	INDIA
ABP-CVoter	December 2023	±3-5%	9-11	0-2	0-2	0	INDIA
Times Now-ETG	December 2023	±3%	6-10	3-5	1-2	0-1	INDIA
India TV-CNX	October 2023	±3%	11	1	1	0	INDIA
Times Now-ETG	September 2023	±3%	8-11	1-3	1-2	0	INDIA
Times Now-ETG	August 2023	±3%	8-12	1-2	1-2	0-1	INDIA

Polling agency	Date published	Margin of error					Lead
Polling agency	Date published	Margin of error	INDIA	NDA	SAD	Others	Lead
ABP News-CVoter	March 2024	±5%	57%	16%	17%	10%	40
India Today-CVoter	February 2024	±3-5%	65%	17%	18%		47

=== Exit polls ===
Polling agency					Lead
Polling agency	INDIA	NDA	SAD	Others	Lead
DB Live	13	0	0	0	INDIA
TV9 Bharatvarsh- People's Insight - Polstrat	8	2	0	3	INDIA
2019 election	9	2	2	0	INDIA
Actual results	10	0	1	2	INDIA

== Voter turnout ==
Constituency		Poll date	Turnout	Swing
1	Gurdaspur	1 June 2024	66.67%	2.57%▼
2	Amritsar	1 June 2024	56.06%	1.01%▼
3	Khadoor Sahib	1 June 2024	62.55%	1.41%▼
4	Jalandhar (SC)	1 June 2024	71.92%	3.34% ▼
5	Hoshiarpur (SC)	1 June 2024	58.86%	3.22%▼
6	Anandpur Sahib	1 June 2024	61.98%	1.71%▼
7	Ludhiana	1 June 2024	60.12%	2.08%▼
8	Fatehgarh Sahib (SC)	1 June 2024	62.53%	3.16%▼
9	Faridkot (SC)	1 June 2024	63.34%	0.09%▲
10	Firozpur	1 June 2024	56.40%	5.45%▼
11	Bathinda	1 June 2024	72.43%	4.80%▼
12	Sangrur	1 June 2024	69.46%	7.77%▼
13	Patiala	1 June 2024	74.02%	4.14%▼
			62.80%	3.14%▼

== Results ==
Map displaying constituencies won by parties

7	3	2	1
INC	AAP	IND	SAD

Seat Share by Party
1. INC - 7 (53.8%)
2. AAP - 3 (23.1%)
3. SAD - 1 (7.69%)
4. IND - 2 (15.4%)
Vote Share
1. INC 26.39 (24.4%)
2. AAP 26.02 (24.1%)
3. SAD 13.42 (12.4%)
4. BJP 18.56 (17.2%)
5. IND 7.86 (7.28%)
6. SAD(A) 3.84 (3.56%)
7. BSP 2.49 (2.31%)
8. Others 8.88 (8.23%)
9. NOTA 0.49 (0.45%)

=== Results by alliance or party ===
Alliance/ Party		Popular vote			Seats		
Alliance/ Party		Votes	%	±pp	Contested	Won	+/−
INDIA	INC	3,543,824	26.30	▼13.82	13	7	▼1
AAP		3,506,939	26.02	▲18.64	13	3	▲2
NDA	BJP	2,500,877	18.56	▲8.93	13	0	▼2
SAD		1,808,837	13.42	▼14.34	13	1	▼1
SAD (A)		517,024	3.84	▲3.44	12	0	Steady
BSP		335,921	2.49	▼1.03	13	0	Steady
CPI		21,383	0.16%		1	0	-
CPI(M)		5,958	0.04%		1	0	-
RSP		1,898	0.01%				
ASP(K)		9,680	0.07				
Others						0	Steady
IND		1,058,241	7.86			2	▲2
NOTA		67,158	0.49	▼0.63			
Total		13,463,765	100%	-		13	-

=== Results by region ===
Region	Seats	INC	AAP	SAD+	IND
Malwa	8	4	2	1	1
Majha	3	2	0	0	1
Doaba	2	1	1	0	0
Total	13	7	3	1	2

=== Results by Seat Reservation ===
Seat Type	Seats									
Seat Type	Seats	INC			AAP			SAD		
Seat Type	Seats	Contested	Won	SR(%)	Contested	Won	SR(%)	Contested	Won	SR(%)
General	9	9	5	55.56	9	2	22.22	9	1	11.11
Scheduled Caste	4	4	2	50.00	4	1	25	4	0	0
Total	13	13	7	53.84	13	3	23.07	13	1	7.69

=== Results by constituency ===
Constituency			Winner				Runner Up				Margin	%
#	Name	Poll %	Candidate	Party	Votes	%	Candidate	Party	Votes	%	Margin	%
1	Gurdaspur	66.42%	Sukhjinder Randhawa	INC	3,64,043	33.68	Dinesh Singh	BJP	2,81,182	26.01	82,861	7.67
2	Amritsar	56.00%	Gurjeet Singh Aujla	INC	2,55,181	28.17	Kuldeep Dhaliwal	AAP	2,14,880	23.72	40,301	4.45
3	Khadoor Sahib	62.46%	Amritpal Singh	IND	4,04,430	38.54	Kulbir Singh Zira	INC	2,07,310	19.76	1,97,120	18.78
4	Jalandhar	59.75%	Charanjit Channi	INC	3,90,053	39.43	Sushil Rinku	BJP	2,14,060	21.64	1,75,993	17.79
5	Hoshiarpur	58.65%	Raj Chabbewal	AAP	3,03,859	32.01	Yamini Gomar	INC	2,59,748	27.37	44,111	4.64
6	Anandpur Sahib	61.90%	Malwinder Kang	AAP	3,13,217	29.07	Vijay Inder Singla	INC	3,02,371	28.06	10,846	1.01
7	Ludhiana	60.18%	Amrinder Singh Raja	INC	3,22,224	30.41	Ravneet Bittu	BJP	3,01,282	28.43	20,942	1.98
8	Fatehgarh Sahib	62.58%	Amar Singh	INC	3,32,591	34.13	Gurpreet Singh GP	AAP	2,98,389	30.62	34,202	3.51
9	Faridkot	63.41%	Sarabjeet Khalsa	IND	2,98,062	29.38	Karamjit Anmol	AAP	2,28,009	22.47	70,053	6.91
10	Firozpur	67.31%	Sher Singh Ghubaya	INC	2,66,626	23.65	Jagdeep Singh Kaka	AAP	2,63,384	23.36	3,242	0.29
11	Bathinda	69.42%	Harsimrat Kaur	SAD	3,76,558	32.70	Gurmeet Khuddian	AAP	3,26,902	28.38	49,656	4.32
12	Sangrur	64.63%	Gurmeet Hayer	AAP	3,64,085	36.02	Sukhpal Khaira	INC	1,91,525	18.95	1,72,560	17.07
13	Patiala	63.60%	Dharamvir Gandhi	INC	3,05,616	26.52	Balbir Singh	AAP	2,90,785	25.24	14,831	1.28

=== Results by constituency ===
Constituency		INC Votes	AAP Votes	SAD Votes	BJP Votes	Independent	Winner
No.	Name	INC Votes	AAP Votes	SAD Votes	BJP Votes	Independent	Winner
1	Gurdaspur	3,64,043	2,77,252	85,500	2,81,182		INC
2	Amritsar	2,55,181	2,14,880	1,62,896	2,07,205		INC
3	Khadoor Sahib*	2,07,310	2,07,310	1,94,836	86,416	4,04,430	INPD
4	Jalandhar	3,90,053	2,08,889	67,911	2,14,060		INC
5	Hoshiarpur	2,59,748	3,03,859	91,789	1,99,994		AAP
6	Anandpur Sahib	3,02,371	3,13,217	1,17,936	1,86,578		AAP
7	Ludhiana	3,22,224	2,37,077	90,220	3,01,282		INC
8	Fatehgarh Sahib	3,32,591	2,98,389	1,26,730	1,27,521		INC
9	Faridkot*	1,60,357	2,28,009	1,38,251	1,23,533	2,98,062	INPD
10	Firozpur	2,66,626	2,63,384	2,53,645	2,55,097		INC
11	Bathinda	2,02,011	3,26,902	3,76,558	1,10,762		SAD
12	Sangrur	1,91,525	3,64,085	62,488	1,28,253		AAP
13	Patiala	3,05,616	2,90,785	1,53,978	2,88,998		INC

- Won by Independents

=== Changes in Seats ===
Party	Holds	Lost	Gained	Total tally
Indian National Congress	5	3	2	7
Aam Aadmi Party	1	0	2	3
Shiromani Akali Dal	1	1	0	1
Independent	0	0	2	2
Bharatiya Janata Party	0	2	0	0

- Indian National Congress (INC)
  - Held: Amritsar, Jalandhar, Ludhiana, Fatehgarh Sahib, Patiala
  - Lost: Khadoor Sahib, Faridkot, Anandpur Sahib
  - Gained: Gurdaspur, Firozpur
- Aam Aadmi Party (AAP)
  - Held: Sangrur
  - Gained: Hoshiarpur, Anandpur Sahib
- Shiromani Akali Dal (SAD)
  - Held: Bathinda
  - Lost: Firozpur
- Independent
  - Gained: Khadoor Sahib, Faridkot
- Bharatiya Janata Party (BJP)
  - Lost: Gurdaspur, Hoshiarpur

== Assembly segments wise lead of Parties ==
Assembly segment wise lead of parties in 2024 general election in Punjab

Party	Lead in Assembly segments	2022 Results	+/-
Indian National Congress	37	18	▲19
Aam Aadmi Party	33	92	▼59
Bharatiya Janata Party	23	2	▲21
Independent	15	1	▲14
Shiromani Akali Dal	9	3	▲6
Bahujan Samaj Party	0	1	▼1
Total	117		–

== Assembly Seat wise leads ==
Constituency		Winner				Runner-up				Margin
#	Name	Candidate	Party	Votes	%	Candidate	Party	Votes	%	Margin
Gurdaspur
1	Sujanpur	Dinesh Singh	BJP	62,785	51.19	Sukhjinder Singh Randhawa	INC	36,004	29.35	26,781
2	Bhoa	Dinesh Singh	BJP	56,393	43.58	Sukhjinder Singh Randhawa	INC	43,577	33.67	12,816
3	Pathankot	Dinesh Singh	BJP	52,122	49.93	Sukhjinder Singh Randhawa	INC	30,668	29.38	21,454
4	Gurdaspur	Sukhjinder Singh Randhawa	INC	36,981	33.54	Amansher Singh (Shery Kalsi)	AAP	34,228	31.04	2,753
5	Dina Nagar	Sukhjinder Singh Randhawa	INC	45,319	35.67	Dinesh Singh	BJP	36,860	29.01	8,459
6	Qadian	Sukhjinder Singh Randhawa	INC	41,806	35.25	Amansher Singh (Shery Kalsi)	AAP	38,654	32.59	3,152
7	Batala	Sukhjinder Singh Randhawa	INC	36,648	32.38	Amansher Singh (Shery Kalsi)	AAP	35,713	31.56	935
9	Fatehgarh Churian	Sukhjinder Singh Randhawa	INC	42,512	37.05	Amansher Singh (Shery Kalsi)	AAP	39,640	34.54	2,872
10	Dera Baba Nanak	Sukhjinder Singh Randhawa	INC	48,198	38.06	Amansher Singh (Shery Kalsi)	AAP	44,258	34.94	3,940
Amritsar
11	Ajnala	Kuldeep Singh Dhaliwal	AAP	35,344	32.85	Gurjeet Singh Aujla	INC	30,309	28.17	5,035
12	Raja Sansi	Gurjeet Singh Aujla	INC	36,285	31.98	Kuldeep Singh Dhaliwal	AAP	31,742	27.97	4,543
13	Majitha	Anil Joshi	SAD	40,981	39.64	Kuldeep Singh Dhaliwal	AAP	28,530	27.59	12,451
15	Amritsar North	Taranjit Singh Sandhu	BJP	47,408	42.77	Gurjeet Singh Aujla	INC	28,724	25.91	18,684
16	Amritsar West	Gurjeet Singh Aujla	INC	35,012	33.35	Taranjit Singh Sandhu	BJP	30,937	29.47	4,075
17	Amritsar Central	Taranjit Singh Sandhu	BJP	35,572	44.75	Gurjeet Singh Aujla	INC	24,878	31.30	10,694
18	Amritsar East	Taranjit Singh Sandhu	BJP	29,635	32.37	Gurjeet Singh Aujla	INC	28,440	31.06	1,195
19	Amritsar South	Kuldeep Singh Dhaliwal	AAP	28,431	34.55	Gurjeet Singh Aujla	INC	21,782	26.47	6,649
20	Attari	Gurjeet Singh Aujla	INC	32,479	30.64	Kuldeep Singh Dhaliwal	AAP	24,810	23.40	7,669
Khadoor Sahib
14	Jandiala	Amritpal Singh	IND	45,190	39.62	Laljit Singh Bhullar	AAP	23,571	20.66	21,619
21	Tarn Taran	Amritpal Singh	IND	44,703	40.93	Kulbir Singh Zira	INC	20,193	18.49	24,510
22	Khem Karan	Amritpal Singh	IND	46,600	34.46	Laljit Singh Bhullar	AAP	30,254	22.37	16,346
23	Patti	Amritpal Singh	IND	56,758	45.12	Laljit Singh Bhullar	AAP	27,804	22.10	28,954
24	Khadoor Sahib	Amritpal Singh	IND	58,426	45.82	Laljit Singh Bhullar	AAP	21,915	17.18	36,511
25	Baba Bakala	Amritpal Singh	IND	52,599	44.72	Kulbir Singh Zira	INC	20,866	17.74	31,733
27	Kapurthala	Kulbir Singh Zira	INC	28,603	33.01	Amritpal Singh	IND	21,548	24.87	7,055
28	Sultanpur Lodhi	Amritpal Singh	IND	32,875	36.51	Kulbir Singh Zira	INC	23,445	26.04	9,430
75	Zira	Amritpal Singh	IND	43,901	32.95	Kulbir Singh Zira	INC	36,302	27.25	7,599
Jalandhar (SC)
30	Phillaur	Charanjit Singh Channi	INC	46,956	39.62	Pawan Kumar Tinu	AAP	27,401	23.12	19,555
31	Nakodar	Charanjit Singh Channi	INC	43,874	38.66	Pawan Kumar Tinu	AAP	23,201	20.44	20,673
32	Shahkot	Charanjit Singh Channi	INC	47,009	43.24	Pawan Kumar Tinu	AAP	28,116	25.86	18,893
33	Kartarpur	Charanjit Singh Channi	INC	45,158	40.50	Pawan Kumar Tinu	AAP	29,106	26.11	16,052
34	Jalandhar West	Charanjit Singh Channi	INC	44,394	40.38	Sushil Kumar Rinku	BJP	42,837	38.96	1,557
35	Jalandhar Central	Sushil Kumar Rinku	BJP	38,115	39.06	Charanjit Singh Channi	INC	34,382	35.23	3,733
36	Jalandhar North	Sushil Kumar Rinku	BJP	47,029	40.69	Charanjit Singh Channi	INC	41,043	35.51	5,986
37	Jalandhar Cantt	Charanjit Singh Channi	INC	45,450	41.14	Sushil Kumar Rinku	BJP	29,094	26.34	16,356
38	Adampur	Charanjit Singh Channi	INC	41,243	42.49	Pawan Kumar Tinu	AAP	27,172	27.99	14,071
Hoshiarpur (SC)
8	Sri Hargobindpur	Yamini Gomar	INC	35,258	36.26	Raj Kumar Chabbewal	AAP	28,955	29.78	6,303
26	Bholath	Raj Kumar Chabbewal	AAP	23,426	33.77	Yamini Gomar	INC	22,667	32.67	759
29	Phagwara	Raj Kumar Chabbewal	AAP	30,349	27.51	Yamini Gomar	INC	29,390	26.64	959
39	Mukerian	Anita Som Parkash	BJP	45,900	36.42	Raj Kumar Chabbewal	AAP	34,826	27.64	11,074
40	Dasuya	Anita Som Parkash	BJP	39,075	33.53	Raj Kumar Chabbewal	AAP	35,032	30.06	4,043
41	Urmar	Yamini Gomar	INC	36,303	35.15	Raj Kumar Chabbewal	AAP	33,269	32.21	3,034
42	Sham Chaurasi	Raj Kumar Chabbewal	AAP	34,655	33.31	Yamini Gomar	INC	32,387	31.13	2,268
43	Hoshiarpur	Anita Som Parkash	BJP	38,664	34.14	Raj Kumar Chabbewal	AAP	36,957	32.63	1,707
44	Chabbewal	Raj Kumar Chabbewal	AAP	44,933	46.19	Yamini Gomar	INC	18,162	18.67	26,771
Anandpur Sahib
45	Garhshankar	Malwinder Singh Kang	AAP	33,789	31.92	Vijay Inder Singla	INC	23,078	21.80	10,711
46	Banga	Malwinder Singh Kang	AAP	29,315	29.29	Vijay Inder Singla	INC	28,055	28.03	1,260
47	Nawan Shahr	Malwinder Singh Kang	AAP	33,655	32.03	Vijay Inder Singla	INC	24,701	23.51	8,954
48	Balachaur	Vijay Inder Singla	INC	22,684	22.90	Malwinder Singh Kang	AAP	21,772	21.98	912
49	Anandpur Sahib	Malwinder Singh Kang	AAP	39,898	32.02	Subhash Sharma	BJP	34,471	27.67	5,427
50	Rupnagar	Malwinder Singh Kang	AAP	38,951	33.68	Vijay Inder Singla	INC	31,048	26.85	7,903
51	Chamkaur Sahib	Vijay Inder Singla	INC	50,209	41.92	Malwinder Singh Kang	AAP	33,181	27.71	17,028
52	Kharar	Vijay Inder Singla	INC	46,622	29.47	Malwinder Singh Kang	AAP	40,983	25.90	5,639
53	S A S Nagar	Vijay Inder Singla	INC	41,790	30.05	Malwinder Singh Kang	AAP	40,697	29.26	1,093
Ludhiana
60	Ludhiana East	Ravneet Singh Bittu	BJP	50,833	35.83	Amrinder Singh Raja Warring	INC	41,296	29.11	9,537
61	Ludhiana South	Ravneet Singh Bittu	BJP	37,378	35.35	Amrinder Singh Raja Warring	INC	32,982	31.20	4,396
62	Atam Nagar	Amrinder Singh Raja Warring	INC	30,696	33.06	Ashok Prashar Pappi	AAP	25,600	27.58	5,096
63	Ludhiana Central	Ravneet Singh Bittu	BJP	41,450	44.16	Amrinder Singh Raja Warring	INC	24,155	25.74	17,295
64	Ludhiana West	Ravneet Singh Bittu	BJP	45,424	41.72	Amrinder Singh Raja Warring	INC	30,889	28.37	14,535
65	Ludhiana North	Ravneet Singh Bittu	BJP	53,725	44.43	Amrinder Singh Raja Warring	INC	31,415	25.98	22,310
66	Gill	Amrinder Singh Raja Warring	INC	54,981	32.57	Ashok Prashar Pappi	AAP	41,520	24.59	13,461
68	Dakha	Amrinder Singh Raja Warring	INC	40,276	34.77	Ashok Prashar Pappi	AAP	28,743	24.81	11,533
70	Jagraon	Amrinder Singh Raja Warring	INC	34,734	33.59	Ashok Prashar Pappi	AAP	25,745	24.90	8,989
Fatehgarh Sahib (SC)
54	Bassi Pathana	Gurpreet Singh GP	AAP	30,183	34.14	Amar Singh	INC	29,625	33.51	558
55	Fatehgarh Sahib	Gurpreet Singh GP	AAP	38,640	37.00	Amar Singh	INC	34,275	32.82	4,365
56	Amloh	Amar Singh	INC	30,216	30.81	Gurpreet Singh GP	AAP	29,427	30.00	789
57	Khanna	Gurpreet Singh GP	AAP	35,705	34.26	Amar Singh	INC	30,581	29.35	5,124
58	Samrala	Amar Singh	INC	37,641	34.77	Gurpreet Singh GP	AAP	35,316	32.62	2,325
59	Sahnewal	Amar Singh	INC	55,541	34.36	Gejja Ram	BJP	41,160	25.47	14,381
67	Payal	Amar Singh	INC	34,447	33.72	Gurpreet Singh GP	AAP	33,409	32.71	1,038
69	Raikot	Amar Singh	INC	45,021	49.24	Gurpreet Singh GP	AAP	26,550	29.04	18,471
106	Amargarh	Gurpreet Singh GP	AAP	36,922	35.72	Amar Singh	INC	33,977	32.87	2,945
Faridkot (SC)
71	Nihal Singh Wala	Sarabjeet Singh Khalsa	IND	46,844	40.08	Karamjit Anmol	AAP	25,167	21.53	21,677
72	Bhagha Purana	Sarabjeet Singh Khalsa	IND	37,289	33.99	Karamjit Anmol	AAP	25,625	23.36	11,664
73	Moga	Sarabjeet Singh Khalsa	IND	28,668	24.09	Karamjit Anmol	AAP	26,589	22.35	2,079
74	Dharamkot	Sarabjeet Singh Khalsa	IND	34,239	28.93	Karamjit Anmol	AAP	33,678	28.45	561
84	Gidderbaha	Sarabjeet Singh Khalsa	IND	32,423	27.83	Karamjit Anmol	AAP	20,310	17.43	12,113
87	Faridkot	Karamjit Anmol	AAP	23,876	21.56	Sarabjeet Singh Khalsa	IND	23,130	20.89	746
88	Kotkapura	Karamjit Anmol	AAP	24,894	23.79	Sarabjeet Singh Khalsa	IND	22,417	21.42	2,477
89	Jaitu	Sarabjeet Singh Khalsa	IND	30,953	30.86	Karamjit Anmol	AAP	23,644	23.57	7,309
90	Rampura Phul	Sarabjeet Singh Khalsa	IND	40,959	37.41	Karamjit Anmol	AAP	22,893	20.91	18,066
Firozpur
76	Firozpur City	Rana Gurmit Singh Sodhi	BJP	33,077	31.00	Sher Singh Ghubaya	INC	32,687	30.64	390
77	Firozpur Rural	Nardev Singh Bobby Mann	SAD	36,093	28.18	Jagdeep Singh Kaka Brar	AAP	34,398	26.86	1,695
78	Guru Har Sahai	Nardev Singh Bobby Mann	SAD	46,683	38.52	Sher Singh Ghubaya	INC	26,614	21.96	20,069
79	Jalalabad	Sher Singh Ghubaya	INC	43,932	29.57	Nardev Singh Bobby Mann	SAD	43,002	28.94	930
80	Fazilka	Sher Singh Ghubaya	INC	46,113	35.68	Rana Gurmit Singh Sodhi	BJP	37,457	28.98	8,656
81	Abohar	Rana Gurmit Singh Sodhi	BJP	52,847	46.98	Jagdeep Singh Kaka Brar	AAP	20,321	18.06	32,526
82	Balluana	Rana Gurmit Singh Sodhi	BJP	44,378	35.47	Jagdeep Singh Kaka Brar	AAP	28,296	22.62	16,082
85	Malout	Nardev Singh Bobby Mann	SAD	32,815	27.80	Jagdeep Singh Kaka Brar	AAP	31,976	27.09	839
86	Muktsar	Jagdeep Singh Kaka Brar	AAP	40,393	32.94	Nardev Singh Bobby Mann	SAD	34,633	28.24	5,760
Bathinda
83	Lambi	Harsimrat Kaur Badal	SAD	54,337	46.13	Gurmeet Singh Khudian	AAP	31,073	26.38	23,264
91	Bhucho Mandi	Harsimrat Kaur Badal	SAD	46,863	36.80	Gurmeet Singh Khudian	AAP	32,124	25.23	14,739
92	Bathinda Urban	Parampal Kaur Sidhu	BJP	36,287	25.52	Harsimrat Kaur Badal	SAD	35,769	25.16	518
93	Bathinda Rural	Harsimrat Kaur Badal	SAD	41,423	38.18	Gurmeet Singh Khudian	AAP	30,548	28.16	10,875
94	Talwandi Sabo	Harsimrat Kaur Badal	SAD	34,045	31.47	Gurmeet Singh Khudian	AAP	30,762	28.44	3,283
95	Maur	Gurmeet Singh Khudian	AAP	35,211	30.63	Harsimrat Kaur Badal	SAD	34,959	30.41	252
96	Mansa	Gurmeet Singh Khudian	AAP	48,008	32.62	Harsimrat Kaur Badal	SAD	41,062	27.90	6,946
97	Sardulgarh	Gurmeet Singh Khudian	AAP	44,474	33.25	Harsimrat Kaur Badal	SAD	39,338	29.41	5,136
98	Budhlada	Harsimrat Kaur Badal	SAD	47,223	33.58	Gurmeet Singh Khudian	AAP	40,039	28.47	7,184
Sangrur
99	Lehra	Gurmeet Singh Meet Hayer	AAP	40,226	34.72	Sukhpal Singh Khaira	INC	21,543	18.59	18,683
100	Dirba	Gurmeet Singh Meet Hayer	AAP	48,614	39.95	Simranjit Singh Mann	SAD(A)	26,101	21.45	22,513
101	Sunam	Gurmeet Singh Meet Hayer	AAP	50,662	39.88	Simranjit Singh Mann	SAD(A)	24,119	18.99	26,543
102	Bhadaur	Gurmeet Singh Meet Hayer	AAP	31,512	32.27	Simranjit Singh Mann	SAD(A)	25,283	25.89	6,229
103	Barnala	Gurmeet Singh Meet Hayer	AAP	37,674	35.02	Simranjit Singh Mann	SAD(A)	22,161	20.60	15,513
104	Mehal Kalan	Gurmeet Singh Meet Hayer	AAP	35,726	37.28	Simranjit Singh Mann	SAD(A)	23,711	24.74	12,015
105	Malerkotla	Sukhpal Singh Khaira	INC	45,508	41.09	Gurmeet Singh Meet Hayer	AAP	33,854	30.57	11,654
107	Dhuri	Gurmeet Singh Meet Hayer	AAP	49,413	46.27	Simranjit Singh Mann	SAD(A)	17,131	16.04	32,282
108	Sangrur	Gurmeet Singh Meet Hayer	AAP	35,110	29.65	Sukhpal Singh Khaira	INC	26,448	22.33	8,662
Patiala
109	Nabha	Dharamvir Gandhi	INC	36,230	30.14	Balbir Singh	AAP	32,577	27.10	3,653
110	Patiala Rural	Balbir Singh	AAP	37,446	29.09	Dharamvir Gandhi	INC	34,985	27.18	2,461
111	Rajpura	Preneet Kaur	BJP	37,340	32.19	Dharamvir Gandhi	INC	32,032	27.61	5,308
112	Dera Bassi	Preneet Kaur	BJP	65,742	33.66	Dharamvir Gandhi	INC	46,621	23.87	19,121
113	Ghanaur	Dharamvir Gandhi	INC	37,633	34.17	Balbir Singh	AAP	28,543	25.91	9,090
114	Sanour	Balbir Singh	AAP	43,048	30.80	Dharamvir Gandhi	INC	37,846	27.08	5,202
115	Patiala	Preneet Kaur	BJP	41,548	44.36	Dharamvir Gandhi	INC	23,035	24.59	18,513
116	Samana	Balbir Singh	AAP	36,141	28.85	Dharamvir Gandhi	INC	28,937	23.10	7,204
117	Shutrana	Balbir Singh	AAP	32,499	28.68	Dharamvir Gandhi	INC	27,353	24.14	5,146

== Assembly Segment wise Party Vote ==
=== 1. Gurdaspur ===
No.	Assembly constituency	INC Votes	AAP Votes	SAD Votes	BJP Votes	Lead	Runner-up
1	Sujanpur	36004	17258	1938	62785	BJP	INC
2	Bhoa	43577	21372	2825	56393	BJP	INC
3	Pathankot	30668	16646	2001	52122	BJP	INC
4	Gurdaspur	36981	34228	10233	21954	INC	AAP
5	Dina Nagar	45319	27647	9059	36860	INC	BJP
6	Qadian	41806	38654	15568	12959	INC	AAP
7	Batala	36648	35713	10758	22674	INC	AAP
8	Fatehgarh Churian	42512	39640	15713	6973	INC	AAP
9	Dera Baba Nanak	48198	44258	17099	5981	INC	AAP
10	Ballot Paper	2330	1836	306	2481	BJP	INC
11	Total	364,043	277,252	85,500	281,182	INC	BJP

=== 2. Sri Amritsar Sahib ===
No.	Assembly constituency	INC Votes	AAP Votes	SAD Votes	BJP Votes	Lead	Runner-up
1	Ajnala	30309	35344	17946	14404	AAP	INC
2	Raja Sansi	36285	31742	22942	11680	INC	AAP
3	Majitha	16505	28530	40981	8056	SAD	AAP
4	Amritsar North	28724	13674	18010	47408	BJP	INC
5	Amritsar West	35012	22080	11451	30937	INC	BJP
6	Amritsar Central	24878	11255	4905	35572	BJP	INC
7	Amritsar East	28440	18402	10943	29635	BJP	INC
8	Amritsar South	21782	28431	10932	15819	AAP	INC
9	Attari	32479	24810	24576	13321	INC	AAP
10	Postal Ballot	767	612	210	373	INC	AAP
11	Total	255,181	214,880	162,896	207,205	INC	AAP

=== 3. Sri Khadoor Sahib ===
No.	Assembly constituency	IND Votes	INC Votes	AAP Votes	SAD Votes	BJP Votes	Lead	Runner-up
1	Jandiala	45190	20052	23571	9873	8223	IND	AAP
2	Tarn Taran	44703	20193	18298	10896	8105	IND	INC
3	Khem Karan	46600	18000	30254	21866	9538	IND	AAP
4	Patti	56758	19554	27804	3554	10264	IND	AAP
5	Khadoor Sahib	58426	19271	21915	11220	8217	IND	AAP
6	Baba Bakala	52599	20866	15486	8771	12296	IND	INC
7	Kapurthala	21548	28603	11835	4969	15142	INC	IND
8	Sultanpur Lodhi	32875	23445	18443	4226	5688	IND	INC
9	Zira	43901	36302	26554	10916	8337	IND	INC
10	Postal Ballot	1830	1024	676	125	563	IND	INC
11	Total	404,430	207,310	194,836	86,416	86,373	IND	INC

=== 4. Jalandhar ===
No.	Assembly constituency	INC Votes	AAP Votes	SAD Votes	BJP Votes	BSP Votes	Lead	Runner-up
1	Phillaur	46956	27401	10460	12131	16066	INC	AAP
2	Nakodar	43874	23201	15906	14080	10663	INC	AAP
3	Shahkot	47009	28116	13499	11389	1954	INC	AAP
4	Kartarpur	45158	29106	8233	11856	11851	INC	AAP
5	Jalandhar West	44394	15629	2623	42837	1958	INC	BJP
6	Jalandhar Central	34382	18528	2404	38115	2141	BJP	INC
7	Jalandhar North	41043	19150	2475	47029	3221	BJP	INC
8	Jalandhar Cantt	45450	20246	5683	29094	6590	INC	BJP
9	Adampur	41243	27172	6528	7171	10412	INC	AAP
10	Postal Ballot	544	340	100	358	85	INC	AAP
11	Total						INC	BJP

=== 5. Hoshiarpur ===
No.	Assembly constituency	INC Votes	AAP Votes	SAD Votes	BJP Votes	Lead	Runner-up
1	Sri Hargobindpur	35258	28955	19368	4569	INC	AAP
2	Bholath	22667	23426	12302	4731	AAP	INC
3	Phagwara	29390	30349	9244	27756	AAP	INC
4	Mukerian	29382	34826	9433	45900	BJP	AAP
5	Dasuya	29207	35032	5902	39075	BJP	AAP
6	Urmar	36303	33269	11517	13030	INC	AAP
7	Sham Chaurasi	32387	34655	7961	15379	AAP	INC
8	Hoshiarpur	25180	36957	3841	38664	BJP	AAP
9	Chabbewal	18162	44933	11935	9472	AAP	INC
10	Postal Ballot	1812	1457	286	1418	INC	AAP
11	Total	259,748	303,859	91,789	199,994	AAP	INC

=== 6. Sri Anandpur Sahib ===
No.	Assembly constituency	INC Votes	AAP Votes	SAD Votes	BSP Votes	BJP Votes	Lead	Runner-up
1	Garhshankar	23078	33789	11270	13346	18971	AAP	INC
2	Banga (SC)	28055	29315	14098	16935	6963	AAP	INC
3	Nawan Shahr	24701	33655	12480	19250	9691	AAP	INC
4	Balachaur	22684	21772	14652	20616	14820	INC	AAP
5	Anandpur Sahib	33227	39898	8337	2616	34471	AAP	BJP
6	Rupnagar	31048	38951	12461	8641	16990	AAP	INC
7	Chamkaur Sahib (SC)	50209	33181	14176	3887	7534	INC	AAP
8	Kharar	46622	40983	17654	2681	40391	INC	AAP
9	S.A.S. Nagar	41790	40697	12523	1981	36005	INC	AAP
10	Postal Ballot	957	976	285	204	742	AAP	INC
11	Total	302371	313217	117936	90157	186578	AAP	INC

=== 7. Ludhiana ===
No.	Assembly constituency	INC Votes	AAP Votes	SAD Votes	BJP Votes	Lead	Runner-up
1	Ludhiana East	41296	28096	13395	50833	BJP	INC
2	Ludhiana South	32982	19289	4939	37378	BJP	INC
3	Atam Nagar	30696	25600	6060	22753	INC	BJP
4	Ludhiana Central	24155	20039	4092	41450	BJP	INC
5	Ludhiana West	30889	22461	5560	45424	BJP	INC
6	Ludhiana North	31415	25127	4514	53725	BJP	INC
7	Gill (SC)	54981	41520	16985	30154	INC	AAP
8	Dakha	40276	28743	21776	7072	INC	AAP
9	Jagraon (SC)	34734	25745	12752	12138	INC	AAP
10	Postal Ballot	800	457	147	355	INC	AAP
11	Total	322224	237077	90220	301282	INC	BJP

=== 8. Fatehgarh Sahib ===
No.	Assembly constituency	INC Votes	AAP Votes	SAD Votes	BJP Votes	Lead	Runner-up
1	Bassi Pathana (SC)	29625	30183	10101	7524	AAP	INC
2	Fatehgarh Sahib	34275	38640	7416	14280	AAP	INC
3	Amloh	30216	29427	13883	18434	INC	AAP
4	Khanna	30581	35705	12335	19688	AAP	INC
5	Samrala	37641	35316	17619	7970	INC	AAP
6	Sahnewal	55541	31287	19637	41160	INC	BJP
7	Payal (SC)	34447	33409	18574	5776	INC	AAP
8	Raikot (SC)	45021	26550	11201	3929	INC	AAP
9	Amargarh	33977	36922	15695	8378	AAP	INC
10	Postal Ballot	1267	950	269	382	INC	AAP
11	Total					INC	AAP

=== 11. Bathinda ===
No.	Assembly constituency	INC Votes	AAP Votes	SAD Votes	BJP Votes	Lead	Runner-up
1	Lambi	17371	31073	54337	6416	SAD	AAP
2	Bhucho Mandi (SC)	22154	32124	46863	10216	SAD	AAP
3	Bathinda Urban	30420	32780	35769	36287	BJP	SAD
4	Bathinda Rural (SC)	18201	30548	41423	6651	SAD	AAP
5	Talwandi Sabo	22631	30762	34045	6694	SAD	AAP
6	Maur	17751	35211	34959	8278	AAP	SAD
7	Mansa	23769	48008	41062	16856	AAP	SAD
8	Sardulgarh	25619	44474	39338	8526	AAP	SAD
9	Budhlada (SC)	22943	40039	47223	10331	SAD	AAP
10	Postal Ballot	1152	1883	1539	507	SAD	AAP
11	Total	202011	326902	376558	110762	SAD	AAP

=== 12. Sangrur ===
No.	Assembly constituency	INC Votes	AAP Votes	SAD Votes	BJP Votes	Lead	Runner-up
1	Lehra	21543	40226	5952	20405	AAP	INC
2	Dirba	17102	48614	7755	9960	AAP	INC
3	Sunam	17450	50662	8583	17991	AAP	BJP
4	Bhadaur	15469	31512	9854	9326	AAP	INC
5	Barnala	15176	37674	5724	19218	AAP	BJP
6	Mehal Kalan	16631	35726	7121	5048	AAP	INC
7	Malerkotla	45508	33854	5670	10275	INC	AAP
8	Dhuri	14882	49413	5780	12450	AAP	INC
9	Sangrur	26448	35110	5826	23108	AAP	INC
10	Postal Ballot	1316	1294	223	472	INC	AAP
11	Total	191525	364085	62488	128253	AAP	INC

=== 13. Patiala ===
No.	Assembly constituency	INC Votes	AAP Votes	SAD Votes	BJP Votes	Lead	Runner-up
1	Nabha (SC)	36230	32577	18345	22198	INC	AAP
2	Patiala Rural	34985	37446	15182	30320	AAP	INC
3	Rajpura	32032	22336	14057	37340	BJP	INC
4	Dera Bassi	46621	36390	33748	65742	BJP	INC
5	Ghanaur	37633	28543	16238	14764	INC	AAP
6	Sanour	37846	43048	19497	25670	AAP	INC
7	Patiala	23035	21105	4634	41548	BJP	INC
8	Samana	28937	36141	17871	26387	AAP	INC
9	Shutrana (SC)	27353	32499	14118	24501	AAP	INC
10	Postal Ballot	944	700	198	528	INC	AAP
11	Total	305616	290785	153978	288998	INC	AAP

== See also ==
- 2022 Punjab Legislative Assembly election
- 2024 Indian general election in Rajasthan
- 2024 Indian general election in Haryana
- 2024 Indian general election in Chandigarh
- 2024 Indian general election in Kerala
