= Hoshiarpur Lok Sabha constituency =

Lok Sabha constituency in Punjab

Coordinates: 31.5°N 75.9°E

Hoshiarpur PB-5
- Lok Sabha constituency
- Interactive Map Outlining Hoshiarpur Lok Sabha constituency

Constituency details
- Country: India
- State: Punjab
- Assembly constituencies: Sri Hargobindpur; Bholath; Phagwara; Mukerian; Dasuya; Urmar; Sham Chaurasi; Hoshiarpur; Chabbewal
- Established: 1952
- Reservation: SC

Member of Parliament
- 18th Lok Sabha
- Incumbent Raj Kumar Chabbewal
- Party: AAP
- Alliance: None
- Elected year: 2024
- Preceded by: Som Parkash

Hoshiarpur is one of the 13 Lok Sabha (parliamentary) constituencies in Punjab state in northern India.

== Assembly segments ==
Hoshiarpur Lok Sabha constituency comprises the following nine Vidhan Sabha (Legislative Assembly) segments:

| # | Name | District | MLA | Party | Leading (in 2024) |
|---|---|---|---|---|---|
| 8 | Sri Hargobindpur (SC) | Gurdaspur | Amarpal Singh | AAP | INC |
| 26 | Bholath | Kapurthala | Sukhpal Singh Khaira | INC | AAP |
| 29 | Phagwara (SC) | Kapurthala | Balwinder Singh Dhaliwal | INC | AAP |
| 39 | Mukerian | Hoshiarpur | Jangi Lal Mahajan | BJP | BJP |
| 40 | Dasuya | Hoshiarpur | Karambir Singh Ghuman | AAP | BJP |
| 41 | Urmar | Hoshiarpur | Jasvir Singh Raja Gill | AAP | INC |
| 42 | Sham Chaurasi (SC) | Hoshiarpur | Ravjot Singh | AAP | AAP |
| 43 | Hoshiarpur | Hoshiarpur | Brahm Shankar Jimpa | AAP | BJP |
| 44 | Chabbewal (SC) | Hoshiarpur | Ishank Kumar | AAP | AAP |

== Members of Parliament ==
Most Successful parties from Hoshiarpur Lok Sabha
1. INC (10 Times) (52.9%)
2. BJP (4 Times) (23.5%)
3. Janata Party (1 Time) (5.88%)

| Year | Member | Party |
|---|---|---|
| 1952 | Diwan Chand Sharma | Indian National Congress |
| 1957 | Sardar Baldev Singh | Indian National Congress |
| 1962 | Amar Nath | Indian National Congress |
| 1967 | Major General Jai Singh (retd.) | Bharatiya Jana Sangh |
| 1971 | Darbara Singh | Indian National Congress |
| 1977 | Balbir Singh | Janata Party |
| 1980 | Giani Zail Singh | Indian National Congress |
| 1984 | Kamal Chaudhry | Indian National Congress |
| 1989 | Kamal Chaudhry | Indian National Congress |
| 1991 | Kamal Chaudhry | Indian National Congress |
| 1996 | Kanshi Ram | Bahujan Samaj Party |
| 1998 | Kamal Chaudhry | Bharatiya Janata Party |
| 1999 | Charanjit Singh | Indian National Congress |
| 2004 | Avinash Rai Khanna | Bharatiya Janata Party |
| 2009 | Santosh Chowdhary | Indian National Congress |
| 2014 | Vijay Sampla | Bharatiya Janata Party |
| 2019 | Som Parkash | Bharatiya Janata Party |
| 2024 | Raj Kumar Chabbewal | Aam Aadmi Party |

== Election results ==
=== 2024 ===
2024 Indian general election: Hoshiarpur
| Party | Candidate | Votes | % | ±% |
|---|---|---|---|---|
| AAP | Raj Kumar Chabbewal | 303,859 | 32.04 | ▲27.51 |
| INC | Yamini Gomar | 259,748 | 27.39 | ▼10.24 |
| BJP | Anita Som Parkash | 199,994 | 21.09 | ▼21.43 |
| SAD | Sohan Singh Thandal | 91,789 | 9.68 | New |
| BSP | Ranjit Kumar | 48,214 | 5.08 | ▼7.90 |
| SAD(A) | Jaswant Singh Fouji | 20,923 | 2.21 | New |
| NOTA | None of the above | 5,552 | 0.59 | ▼0.71 |
| Majority | | 44,111 | 4.65 | ▼0.24 |
| Turnout | | 948,485 | | |
| Registered electors | | 16,01,826 | | |
| AAP gain from BJP | | Swing | ▲27.51 | |

=== 2019 ===
2019 Indian general elections: Hoshiarpur
| Party | Candidate | Votes | % | ±% |
|---|---|---|---|---|
| BJP | Som Parkash | 421,320 | 42.52 | ▲6.47 |
| INC | Raj Kumar Chabbewal | 372,790 | 37.63 | ▲2.99 |
| BSP | Khushi Ram | 128,564 | 12.98 | ▲8.77 |
| AAP | Dr. Ravjot Singh | 44,914 | 4.53 | ▼17.66 |
| NOTA | None of the Above | 12,868 | 1.30 | ▲0.68 |
| Majority | | 48,530 | 4.89 | ▲3.48 |
| Turnout | | 991,665 | 62.08 | ▼2.66 |
| BJP hold | | Swing | ▲6.47 | |

=== 2014 results ===
2014 Indian general elections: Hoshiarpur
| Party | Candidate | Votes | % | ±% |
|---|---|---|---|---|
| BJP | Vijay Sampla | 346,643 | 36.05 | ▼6.46 |
| INC | Mohinder Singh Kaypee | 333,061 | 34.64 | ▼7.91 |
| AAP | Yamini Gomar | 213,388 | 22.19 | New |
| BSP | Bhagwan Singh Chauhan | 40,497 | 4.21 | ▼8.04 |
| NOTA | None of the Above | 5,976 | 0.62 | N/A |
| Majority | | 13,582 | 1.41 | ▲1.37 |
| Turnout | | 961,562 | 64.74 | ▼0.16 |
| BJP gain from INC | | Swing | ▼6.46 | |

=== 2009 results ===
2009 Indian general elections: Hoshiarpur
| Party | Candidate | Votes | % | ±% |
|---|---|---|---|---|
| INC | Santosh Chowdhary | 358,812 | 42.55 | |
| BJP | Som Parkash | 3,58,446 | 42.51 | |
| BSP | Sukhwinder Kumar | 1,03,320 | 12.25 | |
| IND | Ritta Rahela | 7,002 | 0.83 | |
| IND | Mahinder Singh Hamira | 5,195 | 0.62 | |
| Majority | | 366 | 0.04 | |
| Turnout | | 8,43,208 | 64.90 | |
| INC gain from BJP | | Swing | | |

== See also ==
- Hoshiarpur district
- List of constituencies of the Lok Sabha
