= Amarjit Singh Sahi =

Indian politician

MLA, Punjab
- In office 2007–2012
- Preceded by: Ramesh Chander
- Succeeded by: Sukhjit Kaur Sahi
- Constituency: Dasuya

Personal details
- Born: c. 1957
- Died: 3 June 2012 (aged 55 years) Chandigarh
- Party: Bharatiya Janta Party
- Spouse: Sukhjit Kaur Sahi
- Children: one son and one daughter

Amarjit Singh Sahi (c. 1957 – 3 June 2012) was an Indian politician and belonged to the ruling Bharatiya Janta Party. He was a member of Punjab Legislative Assembly and represented Dasuya. He died on 3 June 2012.

== Family ==
His father's name was Ranvir Singh.

== Political career ==
Sahi first became a member of Punjab Legislative Assembly in 2007 by winning election from Dasuya. He successfully contested again in 2012. He was appointed Chief Parliamentary Secretary for revenue.

== Personal life ==
Sahi was married to Sukhjit Kaur Sahi, the present MLA from Dasuya. Sukhjit Kaur was nominated for Dasuya by BJP following Amarjit Singh's death. The couple had one son and one daughter.

== Death ==
Sahi died due to a cardiac arrest on 3 June 2012 in Chandigarh. He was 55 years old at the time of death. He was admitted to PGIMER in Chandigarh following a cardiac arrest, where he died.
