= Phagwara Assembly constituency =

Legislative Assembly constituency in Punjab State, India

Coordinates: 31.22°N 75.77°E

Phagwara
- Constituency No. 29 for the Punjab Legislative Assembly

Constituency details
- Country: India
- State: Punjab
- District: Kapurthala
- Lok Sabha constituency: Hoshiarpur
- Total electors: 193,076
- Reservation: SC

Member of Legislative Assembly
- 16th Punjab Legislative Assembly
- Incumbent Balwinder Singh Dhaliwal
- Party: Indian National Congress
- Elected year: 2022

Phagwara is a Punjab Legislative Assembly constituency in Kapurthala district, Punjab state, India.

== Members of the Legislative Assembly ==
Most successful parties from Phagwara Vidhan Sabha
1. INC (13 Times) (65.0%)
2. BJP (4 Times) (20.0%)
3. IND (1 Time) (5.00%)
4. JP (1 Time) (5.00%)
5. INC (I) (1 Time) (5.00%)

Year	Member	Party
As part of PEPSU Legislative Assembly (1951–56)
1952	Sadhu Ram	Indian National Congress
1952	Hans Raj	Indian National Congress
1954	Sadhu Ram	Indian National Congress
1954	Hans Raj	Indian National Congress
As part of Punjab Legislative Assembly (1956–Present)
1957	Hans Raj	Indian National Congress
1962	Om Parkash	Independent
1967	Sadhu Ram	Indian National Congress
1969	Sadhu Ram	Indian National Congress
1972	Piara Ram Dhanowali	Indian National Congress
1977	Sadhu Ram	Janata Party
1980	Piara Ram Dhanowali	Indian National Congress (Indira)
1985	Joginder Singh Mann	Indian National Congress
1992	Joginder Singh Mann	Indian National Congress
1997	Swarna Ram	Bharatiya Janata Party
2002	Joginder Singh Mann	Indian National Congress
2007	Swarna Ram	Bharatiya Janata Party
2012	Som Parkash	Bharatiya Janata Party
2017	Som Parkash	Bharatiya Janata Party
2019*	Balwinder Singh Dhaliwal	Indian National Congress
2022	Balwinder Singh Dhaliwal	Indian National Congress

- * Bypoll

== Election results ==
=== 2027 ===
Punjab Assembly election, 2027: Phagwara
Party	Candidate	Votes	%	±%
AAP	Raj Kumar Chabbewal			
AD (WPD)				New entry
INC				
BSP				
SAD				New entry
BJP				
NOTA	None of the above			
Majority				
Turnout				

=== 2022 ===
Assembly Election, 2022: Phagwara
Party	Candidate	Votes	%	±%
INC	Balwinder Singh Dhaliwal	37,217	29.30	▼4.2
AAP	Joginder Singh Mann	34,505	27.20	▲2.3
BSP	Jasvir Singh Garhi	31,232	24.60	▲19.9
BJP	Vijay Sampla	15,469	12.20	▼22.8
NOTA	None of the above	1,009	0.50	
Majority		2,712	2.12	
Turnout		127,964	66.28	
Registered electors		193,066		
INC hold				

=== 2019 By-Election ===
2019 By-election: Phagwara
Party	Candidate	Votes	%	±%
INC	Balwinder Singh Dhaliwal	49,215		
BJP	Rajesh Bagha	23,099		
BSP	Bhagwan Dass	15,990		
LIP	Jarnail Nangal	9,088		
AAP	Santosh Kumar Gogi	2,910		
Independent	Neetu	706		
RPI	Charanjit Kumar	545		
SAD(A)	Paramjot Kaur Gill	485		
Majority		2712	2.12	
Turnout				
Registered electors				
INC gain from BJP				

=== 2017 ===
Punjab Assembly election, 2017: Phagwara
Party	Candidate	Votes	%	±%
BJP	Som Parkash	45,479	35.0	
INC	Joginder Singh Mann	43,470	33.50	
AAP	Jarnail Nangal	32,374	24.90	
BSP	Surinder Dhanda	6,160	4.7	
NOTA	None of the above	1,094	0.60	
Majority		2,009	1.6	
Turnout		128,755	72.80	
Registered electors		178,370		

=== 2012 ===
Punjab Assembly election, 2012: Phagwara
Party	Candidate	Votes	%	±%
BJP	Som Parkash	46,223	40.9	
INC	Balbir Kumar Sodhi	31,644	28.0	
BSP	Jarnail Singh	26,165	23.10	
Majority		14,579	12.90	
Turnout		112,784	74.50	
Registered electors		151,419		
