= Rattan Singh Ajnala =

Indian politician

Dr. Rattan Singh Ajnala

Member of Parliament, Lok Sabha
- In office 2009–2014
- Preceded by: Constituency established
- Succeeded by: Ranjit Singh Brahmpura
- Constituency: Khadoor Sahib
- In office 2004–2009
- Preceded by: Tarlochan Singh Tur
- Succeeded by: Constituency abolished
- Constituency: Tarn Taran

Member of Punjab Legislative Assembly
- In office 1994-2005
- Preceded by: Harcharan Singh Ajnala
- Succeeded by: Harpartap Singh
- Constituency: Ajnala
- In office 1985-1987
- Preceded by: Harcharan Singh Ajnala
- Succeeded by: Harcharan Singh Ajnala
- Constituency: Ajnala

Personal details
- Born: 16 January 1944 (age 82) Tanda, Punjab, India
- Party: Unaffiliated
- Other political affiliations: Shiromani Akali Dal (Sanyukt); Shiromani Akali Dal (Taksali); Shiromani Akali Dal; Akali Dal – Parkash Singh Badal Group
- Spouse: Dr. Avtar Kaur
- Children: 2 sons
- As of 22 September, 2009

Rattan Singh Ajnala (born 16 January 1944) is a former member of the 15th Lok Sabha who represented the Khadoor Sahib constituency of Punjab. He represented the Tarn Taran constituency of Punjab in the 14th Lok Sabha and is a former member of Shiromani Akali Dal.

== Political career ==
Ajnala is a four time member of Punjab Legislative Assembly from Ajnala Assembly Constituency. His entrance into politics was marked by his election as MLA in 1985 as a candidate of Shiromani Akali Dal. He was elected from this constituency again in 1994 in a by-election as an Independent politician, although affiliated with Akali Dal – Parkash Singh Badal Group. Ajnala was victorious again in 1997 as a candidate of Shiromani Akali Dal, as well as 2002. He was elected as a Member of Parliament, Lok Sabha in 2004 from Tarn Taran, and in 2009 from newly formed Khadoor Sahib. His son Amarpal Singh Ajnala was elected from Ajnala Assembly Constituency in 2012.

Ajnala was expelled from Shiromani Akali Dal on 12 November 2018, after which he formed Shiromani Akali Dal (Taksali) with Ranjit Singh Brahmpura, Sewa Singh Sekhwan, Ravinder Singh Brahmpura, and his son Amarpal Singh Ajnala. Him and Amarpal Singh Ajnala left Shiromani Akali Dal (Taksali) and re-joined Shiromani Akali Dal on 13 February 2020 in Rajasansi in the presence of Sukhbir Singh Badal. However, Ajnala rejoined Shiromani Akali Dal (Taksali) shortly afterwards again.

== Electoral performance ==
In Ajnala Assembly constituency:

Year	Name	Party	Votes	Runner Up	Party	Votes	Margin
1985	Rattan Singh Ajnala	Shiromani Akali Dal	35552	Ajaib Singh	Indian National Congress	16594	18958
1997	Rattan Singh Ajnala	Shiromani Akali Dal	50705	Rajbir Singh	Indian National Congress	48994	1711
2002	Rattan Singh Ajnala	Shiromani Akali Dal	47182	Harpartap Singh	Indian National Congress	46826	356

2009 Indian general election: Khadoor Sahib
Party	Candidate	Votes	%	±%
SAD	Dr. Rattan Singh Ajnala	467,980	49.43	
INC	Rana Gurjeet Singh	4,35,720	46.03	
BSP	Surinder Singh Shahi	13,333	1.41	
Margin of victory		32,260	1.41	
Turnout		9,46,645	70.64	
SAD win (new seat)				
