= Som Parkash =

Indian politician

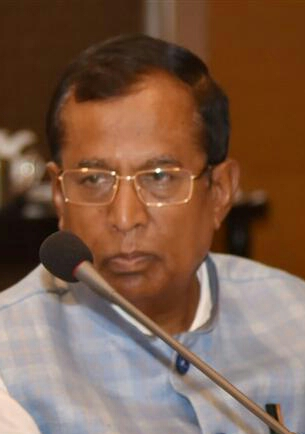

Union Minister of State, Commerce and Industry, Government of India
- In office 30 May 2019 – 4 June 2024
- Prime Minister: Narendra Modi

Member of Parliament, Lok Sabha
- In office 23 May 2019 – 4 June 2024
- Preceded by: Vijay Sampla
- Succeeded by: Raj Kumar Chabbewal
- Constituency: Hoshiarpur, Punjab

Member of the Punjab Legislative Assembly
- In office 2012-2019
- Preceded by: Swarna Ram
- Succeeded by: Balwinder Singh Dhaliwal
- Constituency: Phagwara

Personal details
- Born: 3 April 1949 (age 77) Daulatpur, East Punjab, India
- Party: Bharatiya Janata Party
- Spouse: Anita Som Parkash
- Children: 2
- Parents: Hazara Ram (father); Mahon Devi (mother)

Som Parkash (born 3 April 1949) is a politician belonging to the Bharatiya Janata Party. He was the Union Minister of State for Commerce and Industry, Government of India. Parkash was a Member of Parliament from Hoshiarpur Lok Sabha Constituency and a former Member of Legislative Assembly from Phagwara. He is also a former Deputy Commissioner of Jalandhar and former Indian Administrative Service career officer of 1988 batch in the Punjab cadre.

== Early life and education ==
Som Parkash was born on 3 April 1949, in Daulatpur, Punjab, to Hazara Ram, his father. He received his Master of Arts in Economics from Panjab University, Chandigarh.

== Indian Administrative Service career ==
Parkash was part of the 1988 batch of the Indian Administrative Service (IAS) in the Punjab cadre. He began his career as a research officer in the Punjab State Planning Board in 1972. Later, he served as an excise and taxation officer in the Punjab Excise Department. Parkash has also served as the deputy commissioner of Faridkot, Hoshiarpur and Jalandhar and has other posts, including as the Labour Commissioner, Punjab Urban Planning and Development Authority (PUDA) chief administrator, managing director of the Punjab Financial Corporation and director of the Social Security Department.

== Political career ==
Parkash first unsuccessfully contested Lok Sabha during Indian general elections in 2009 from the Hoshiarpur constituency. Due to corruption charges, sitting Member of Legislative Assembly (MLA) from Phagwara Swarna Ram was dropped from the state cabinet, which led BJP to look for a new candidate and Parkash was selected as the BJP candidate in 2012 Punjab elections. He successfully contested and became MLA from Phagwara. For the next term in 2017, he was again fielded to contest Punjab Vidhan Sabha elections from Phagwara and he won consecutively for the second time

In 2019 General Elections, he was given a ticket from Hoshiarpur Lok Sabha Constituency in place of Vijay Sampla, and he managed to win that election. Prakash was the Minister of State for Commerce and Industry from 2019 to 2024.

He did not seek re-election in 2024 from Hoshiarpur Lok Sabha Constituency and BJP instead fielded his wife Anita Som Parkash.

== Personal life ==
Parkash is married to Anita Som Parkash and has 2 sons, Sanjeev and Sahil Kainth.
