= Dasuya Assembly constituency =

Legislative Assembly constituency in Punjab State, India

Coordinates: 31.814°N 75.659°E

Dasuya
- Constituency No. 40 for the Punjab Legislative Assembly

Constituency details
- Country: India
- State: Punjab
- District: Hoshiarpur
- Lok Sabha constituency: Hoshiarpur
- Total electors: 197,021 (in 2022)
- Reservation: None

Member of Legislative Assembly
- 16th Punjab Legislative Assembly
- Incumbent Karamvir Singh Ghumman
- Party: AAP
- Elected year: 2022

Dasuya Assembly constituency (Sl. No.: 40) is a Punjab Legislative Assembly constituency in Hoshiarpur district, Punjab state, India.

== Members of the Legislative Assembly ==
Most successful parties from Dasuya Vidhan Sabha
1. INC (9 Times) (56.2%)
2. BJP (2 Times) (12.5%)
3. IND (2 Times) (12.5%)
4. AAP (1 Time) (6.25%)
5. INC (I) (1 Time) (6.25%)
6. SAD (1 Time) (6.25%)

Year	Member	Party
1952	Hari Singh	Indian National Congress
1957	Kartar Singh	Indian National Congress
1962	Kartar Singh	Indian National Congress
1967	R.P. Dass	Independent
1969	Devinder Singh	Shiromani Akali Dal
1972	Sat Pal Singh	Indian National Congress
1977	Gurbachan Singh	Indian National Congress
1980	Gurbachan Singh	Indian National Congress (Indira)
1985	Romesh Chander	Independent
1992	Romesh Chander	Indian National Congress
1997	Romesh Chander	Indian National Congress
2002	Romesh Chander	Indian National Congress
2007	Amarjit Singh Sahi	Bharatiya Janta Party
2012	Amarjit Singh Sahi	Bharatiya Janta Party
2012*	Sukhjit Kaur Sahi	Bhartiya Janta Party
2017	Arun Dogra	Indian National Congress
2022	Karamvir Singh Ghumman	Aam Aadmi Party

== Election results ==
=== 2027 ===
Punjab Assembly election, 2027: Dasuya
Party	Candidate	Votes	%	±%
AAP	Karamvir Singh Ghumman			
AD (WPD)				New entry
INC				
BSP				
SAD				New entry
BJP				
NOTA	None of the above			
Majority				
Turnout				

=== 2022 ===
Punjab Assembly election, 2022: Dasuya
Party	Candidate	Votes	%	±%
AAP	Karamvir Singh Ghumman	43,272	32.42	
INC	Arun Dogra	34,865	25.99	
BJP	Raghunath Singh Rana	25,632	19.21	
BSP	Susheel Kumar Sharma	22,883	17.15	
SAD(A)	Sukhwinder Singh	3,429	2.57	
NOTA	None of the above	1,031	0.62	
Majority		8,587	6.43	
Turnout				
Registered electors		197,021		

=== 2017 ===
Punjab Assembly election, 2017: Dasuya
Party	Candidate	Votes	%	±%
INC	Arun Dogra	56,527	43.21	
BJP	Sukhjit Kaur	38,889	29.73	
AAP	Balbir Kaur	16,330	12.48	
Independent	Jagmohan Singh	9,926	7.59	
BSP	Jaspreet Sinngh Sahi	3,180	2.43	
Independent	Paramjit	1,310	1.00	
Independent	Baldev Singh	1,024	0.78	
NOTA	None of the above	1,193	0.91	
Registered electors		189,486		

=== Previous results ===
Year	A C No.	Name	Party	Votes	Runner Up	Party	Votes
2017	40	Arun Dogra	INC	56527	Sukhjit Kaur Sahi	BJP	38889
2012	40	Sukhjit Kaur Sahi (By Polls)	BJP	77494	Arun Dogra	INC	30063
2012	40	Amarjit Singh Sahi	BJP	57969	Ramesh Chander Dogra	INC	51746
2007	50	Amarjit Singh Sahi	BJP	51919	Ramesh Chander Dogra	INC	42645
2002	51	Ramesh Chander	INC	38718	Mahant Ram Parkash	BJP	26635
1997	51	Romesh Chander	INC	31754	Mahant Ram Parkash	BJP	31701
1992	51	Romesh Chander	INC	20957	Dial Singh	BSP	8951
1985	51	Ramesh Chander	IND	26891	Gurbachan Singh	INC	17868
1980	51	Gurbachan Singh	INC (I)	24455	Chanan Singh Dhoot	CPM	14150
1977	51	Gurbachan Singh	INC	18923	Hardyal Singh	JNP	17316
1972	45	Sat Pal Singh	INC	20535	Ram Parkash Das	IND	15242
1969	45	Devinder Singh	SAD	19066	Ram Parkash Das	IND	12203
1967	45	Ram Parkash Das	IND	15539	Devinder Singh	IND	11958
1962	132	Kartar Singh	INC	22803	Jagjit Singh	IND	22406
1957	88	Kartar Singh	INC	22784	Jagjit Singh	IND	13465
1951	52	Hari Singh	INC	10894	Harnam Singh	IND	6677
