= Joginder Singh Mann =

Indian politician

Member of the Punjab Legislative Assembly for Phagwara
- In office 2002–2007
- Succeeded by: Swarna Ram

Personal details
- Born: 18 June 1946 (age 80) Phagwara, Nawanshahr, Punjab
- Party: Aam Aadmi Party

Joginder Singh Mann, is an Indian politician and former Minister. He is a member of the Aam Aadmi Party.

== Early life ==
Joginder Singh Mann was born into house of Puran Singh at Phagwara, Punjab. He is also the National President of All India Rangretta Dal.

== Politics ==
He is a three-time MLA from Phagwara Constituency on Congress ticket.

Minister in the Council of Ministers led by former Chief Ministers Late Beant Singh and Harcharan Singh Brar besides Rajinder Kaur Bhattal and Capt Amarinder Singh.

He became chairman of the Punjab Agro Industries Corporation (PAIC).

He contested unsuccessfully in the 2022 Punjab Legislative Assembly election.
