= Raj Kumar Chabbewal =

Indian politician

Dr.Raj Kumar Chabbewal

Member of Parliament, Lok Sabha
- Incumbent
- Assumed office 4 June 2024
- Preceded by: Som Prakash
- Constituency: Hoshiarpur

Deputy Leader of the Opposition of Punjab Legislative Assembly
- In office 10 April 2022 – 15 March 2024
- Leader: Partap Singh Bajwa
- Preceded by: Saravjit Kaur Manuke
- Succeeded by: Aruna Chaudhary

Member of the Punjab Legislative Assembly
- In office 11 Mar 2017 – 15 March 2024
- Preceded by: Dr. Raj Kumar
- Succeeded by: Ishank Kumar Chabbewal
- Constituency: Chabbewal

Chairperson, Congress’s Scheduled Caste (SC) Department, Punjab
- In office 2015–2024

Personal details
- Born: 8 May 1969 (age 57) Punjab, India
- Party: Aam Aadmi Party
- Other party: Indian National Congress
- Spouse: Dr. Harbans Kaur
- Children: 2
- Parents: Late Shri Darshan Singh (father); Smt Simro Devi (mother)
- Profession: Doctor
- Website: Raj Kumar Chabbewal on Facebook

Raj Kumar Chabbewal (born 8 May 1969) is an Indian politician from Punjab. He became a member of the Parliament from Hoshiarpur Lok Sabha constituency winning the 2024 Indian general election in Punjab representing Aam Aadmi Party.

== Political career ==
Chabbewal joined the Indian National Congress in 2009. He was first elected to the Punjab Legislative Assembly from Chabbewal in 2017. In 2022, he was re-elected from the same constituency. On 10 April 2022 he was made the deputy CLP leader of the Punjab Legislative Assembly. Chabbewal was appointed the Chairperson of Congress's Scheduled Caste (SC) Department, Punjab in 2015. He was also a member of All India Congress Committee.

== MLA ==
He was elected as MLA in 2022. The Aam Aadmi Party gained a strong 79% majority in the sixteenth Punjab Legislative Assembly by winning 92 out of 117 seats in the 2022 Punjab Legislative Assembly election. MP Bhagwant Mann was sworn in as Chief Minister on 16 March 2022.

== Electoral performance ==
=== 2024 ===
2024 Indian general election: Hoshiarpur
Party	Candidate	Votes	%	±%
AAP	Dr. Raj Kumar Chabbewal	303,859	32.04	▲27.51
INC	Yamini Gomar	2,59,748	27.39	▼10.24
BJP	Anita Som Parkash	1,99,994	21.09	▼21.43
SAD	Sohan Singh Thandal	91,789	9.68	New
BSP	Ranjit Kumar	48,214	5.08	▼7.9
SAD(A)	Jaswant Singh Fouji	20,923	2.21	New
NOTA	None of the above	5,552	0.59	▼0.71
Majority		44,111	4.65	▼0.24
Turnout		9,48,485		
Registered electors		16,01,826		
AAP gain from BJP		Swing	▲27.51	

Punjab Assembly election, 2022: Chabbewal
Party	Candidate	Votes	%	±%
INC	Raj Kumar Chabbewal	47,375	41.4	▼8.56
AAP	Harminder Singh Sandhu	39,729	34.7	▲17.00
SAD	Sohan Singh Thandal	19,329	16.9	▼7.79
BJP	Dilbag Rai	4,073	3.6	New
NOTA	None of the above	981	0.6	▼0.13
Majority		7,646	6.62	
Turnout		115,506	71.2	
Registered electors		161,535		
INC hold		Swing		
