= Sukhjit Kaur Sahi =

Indian politician

Sukhjit Kaur Sahi is an Indian politician and member of the Bharatiya Janata Party. Sahi is a member of the Punjab Legislative Assembly from the Dasuya constituency in Hoshiarpur district. She was the wife of Amarjit Singh Sahi. She has a son named Harsimrat Singh Sahi and a daughter named Yasmeen. Yasmeen is married to a lawyer named Sidak Sandhu.
