= Harpartap Singh =

Indian politician from Punjab

Member of the Punjab Legislative Assembly
- In office 2017–2022
- Preceded by: Amarpal Singh Ajnala
- Constituency: Ajnala
- In office 2005–2007
- Preceded by: Rattan Singh Ajnala
- Succeeded by: Amarpal Singh Ajnala
- Constituency: Ajnala

Personal details
- Born: 7 August 1951 (age 74)
- Party: INC
- Profession: Politician

Harpartap Singh Ajnala (born 7 August 1951) is an Indian politician and a member of INC. Between 2017-2022, Singh represented the Ajnala Assembly constituency as Member of the Legislative Assembly.

== Member of the Legislative Assembly ==
In the 2017 Punjab Legislative Assembly election, he was elected as the member of the Punjab Legislative Assembly from Ajnala. He won the seat as a candidate of the INC, beating the incumbent member of the Punjab Legislative Assembly Amarpal Singh Ajnala of the SAD by 18,713 votes.

In 2022 Punjab Legislative Assembly election he was defeated by Kuldeep Singh Dhaliwal of AAP.

== Electoral performance ==
Punjab Assembly election, 2017: Ajnala
Party	Candidate	Votes	%	±%
INC	Harpratap Singh Ajnala	61,378	50.79	
SAD	Amarpal Singh Ajnala	42,665	35.31	
AAP	Rajpreet Singh	12,749	10.55	
BSP	Balwinder Singh	860	0.71	
Independent	Rattan Singh	502	0.42	
CPI(M)	Gurnam Singh	411	0.34	
Independent	Dhanwant Singh	404	0.33	
SAD(A)	Amrik Singh	380	0.31	
Independent	Nirmal Singh	308	0.25	
NOTA	None of the above	641	0.40	
Majority		18,713	15.5	
Turnout		1,20,846	82.4	
Registered electors		147,471		

Punjab Assembly election, 2022: Ajnala
Party	Candidate	Votes	%	±%
AAP	Kuldeep Singh Dhaliwal	43,555	35.69	▲25.14
SAD	Amarpal Singh Ajnala (Boni Ajnala)	35,712	29.26	▼6.05
INC	Harpratap Singh Ajnala	33,853	27.74	▼23.05
SAD(A)	Amrik Singh	2,185	1.79	▲1.48
NOTA	None of the above	824	0.68	
Majority		7,843	6.43	
Turnout		122,038	76.9	
Registered electors		158,691		
AAP gain from INC		Swing		

State Legislative Assembly
Preceded by Amarpal Singh Ajnala	Member of the Punjab Legislative Assembly from Ajnala Assembly constituency 2017 – 2022	Succeeded by Kuldeep Singh Dhaliwal
