= Ishank Kumar Chabbewal =

Indian politician

Member of Punjab Legislative Assembly
- Incumbent
- Assumed office 23 November 2024
- Preceded by: Raj Kumar Chabbewal
- Constituency: Chabbewal

Personal details
- Party: Aam Aadmi Party
- Profession: Politician

Dr. Ishank Kumar Chabbewal is an Indian politician from Punjab. is a member of the Punjab Legislative Assembly since 2024, representing the Chabbewal Assembly constituency as a member of the Aam Aadmi Party. The constituency was formerly held by his father Dr. Raj Kumar Chabbewal, who had vacated the seat after being elected as a Lok Sabha MP from the Hoshiarpur Lok Sabha constituency.

== See also ==
- List of chief ministers of Punjab
- Punjab Legislative Assembly
