= Balwinder Singh Dhaliwal =

Indian politician

Balwinder Singh Dhaliwal (born 29 November 1961) is an Indian politician from Punjab. He is an MLA from Phagwara Assembly constituency, which is a reserved constituency for Scheduled Caste community, in Kapurthala District. He won the 2022 Punjab Legislative Assembly election, representing the Indian National Congress.

== Early life and education ==
Dhaliwal was born in Ramdas, Amritsar District, Punjab. He is the son of late Mukhtiar Singh, a retired lieutenant in the Indian Army. He married Sarabjit Kaur and they have two sons. He completed his post graduation in geography in 1984 at S. D. College, Ludhiana.

== Career ==
Dhaliwal won from Phagwara Assembly constituency representing the Indian National Congress in the 2022 Punjab Legislative Assembly election. He polled 37,217 votes and defeated his nearest rival, Joginder Singh Mann of the Aam Aadmi Party, by a margin of 2,712 votes. He first became an MLA winning the 2019 Punjab Legislative Assembly by election and was a member of the committee on General Assurances, and committee on Local Bodies of Punjab Vidhan Sabha during 2022-23 and committee on General Assurances and committee on Petitions for 2023–24.
