= Kuldeep Singh Dhaliwal =

Indian politician

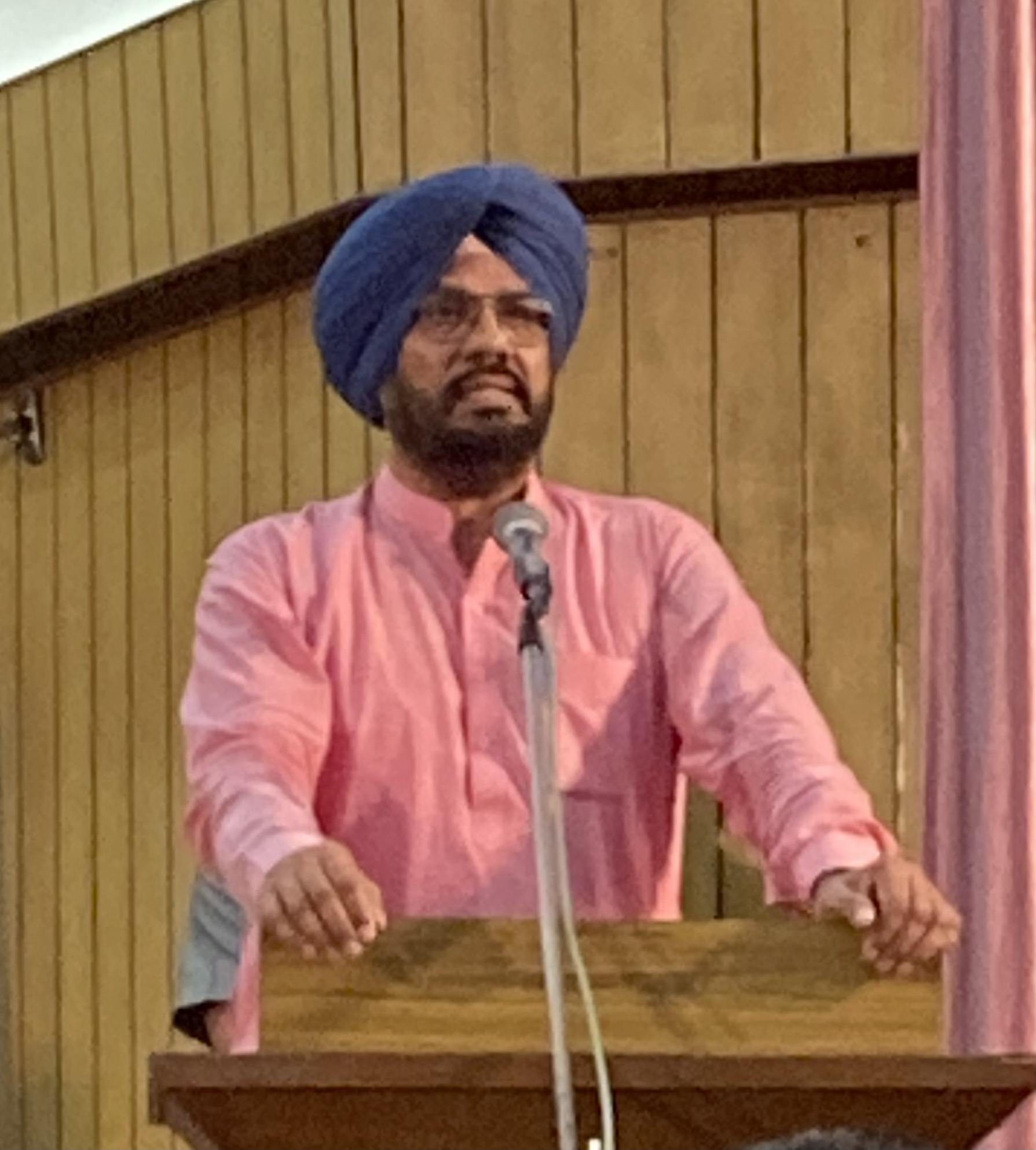
- Kuldeep Singh Dhaliwal in 2022

Cabinet Minister, Government of Punjab
- Incumbent
- Assumed office 21 March 2022
- Governor: Banwarilal Purohit; Gulab Chand Kataria
- Cabinet: Mann ministry
- Chief Minister: Bhagwant Mann
- Ministry and Departments: Rural Development & Panchayats Minister; Agriculture and Farmers’ Welfare; NRI Affairs
- Preceded by: Manpreet Singh Badal

Member of the Punjab Legislative Assembly
- Incumbent
- Assumed office 10 March 2022
- Preceded by: Harpartap Singh
- Constituency: Ajnala

Personal details
- Born: Jagdev Kalan, Punjab, India
- Party: Aam Aadmi Party

Kuldeep Singh Dhaliwal is an Indian politician and the MLA representing the Ajnala Assembly constituency also Cabinet Minister in Punjab Government led by CM Bhagwant Mann. He is a member of the Aam Aadmi Party.

== Member of Legislative Assembly ==
Dhaliwal was elected as the MLA in the 2022 Punjab Legislative Assembly election. He represented the Ajnala Assembly constituency in the Punjab Legislative Assembly. He took oath as a cabinet minister along with nine other MLAs on 19 March at Guru Nanak Dev auditorium of Punjab Raj Bhavan in Chandigarh. Eight ministers including Dhaliwal who took oath were greenhorn (first term) MLAs. The Aam Aadmi Party gained a strong 79% majority in the sixteenth Punjab Legislative Assembly by winning 92 out of 117 seats in the 2022 Punjab Legislative Assembly election. MP Bhagwant Mann was sworn in as Chief Minister on 16 March 2022.

As a cabinet minister in the Mann ministry, Dhaliwal was given the charge of three departments of the Punjab Government:

1. Department of Rural Development & Panchayats
2. Department of Agriculture and Farmers’ Welfare
3. Department of NRI Affairs

== Assets and liabilities declared during elections ==
During the 2022 Punjab Legislative Assembly election, He declared Rs. 1,63,16,898 as an overall financial asset and Rs. 36,55,790 as financial liability.

== Electoral performance ==
2019 Indian general elections: Amritsar
Party	Candidate	Votes	%	±%
INC	Gurjeet Singh Aujla	445,032	51.78	▲1.69
BJP	Hardeep Singh Puri	345,406	40.19	▲9.74
AAP	Kuldeep Singh Dhaliwal	20,087	2.34	▼12.44
CPI	Daswinder Kaur	16,335	1.90	▲0.14
NOTA	None of the Above	8,763	1.02	▲0.06
Majority		99,626	11.59	▼8.05
Turnout		860,582	57.07	▼13.32
INC hold		Swing		

Punjab Assembly election, 2022: Ajnala
Party	Candidate	Votes	%	±%
AAP	Kuldeep Singh Dhaliwal	43,555	35.69	▲25.14
SAD	Amarpal Singh Ajnala (Boni Ajnala)	35,712	29.26	▼6.05
INC	Harpratap Singh Ajnala	33,853	27.74	▼23.05
SAD(A)	Amrik Singh	2,185	1.79	▲1.48
NOTA	None of the above	824	0.68	
Majority		7,843	6.43	
Turnout		122,038	76.9	
Registered electors		158,691		
AAP gain from INC		Swing		

Political offices
Preceded by Tripat Rajinder Singh Bajwa	Punjab Cabinet minister for Animal Husbandry, Fisheries & Dairy Development; March–May 2022	Succeeded by Laljit Singh Bhullar
Preceded by Brahm Mohindra	Punjab Cabinet minister for Minister of Rural Development & Panchayats; 2022–present	Incumbent
Preceded by Pargat Singh	Punjab Cabinet minister for NRI Affairs; 2022–present	Incumbent
Preceded by Bhagwant Mann	Punjab Cabinet minister for Agriculture and Farmers’ Welfare; 2022–present	Incumbent
State Legislative Assembly
Preceded by Harpartap Singh	Member of the Punjab Legislative Assembly from Ajnala Assembly constituency 2022 –	Incumbent
Political offices
