= Ajnala Assembly constituency =

Legislative Assembly constituency in Punjab State, India

Coordinates: 31.84°N 74.76°E

Ajnala
- Constituency No. 11 for the Punjab Legislative Assembly

Constituency details
- Country: India
- State: Punjab
- District: Amritsar
- Lok Sabha constituency: Amritsar
- Established: 1951
- Total electors: 157,161 (in 2022)
- Reservation: None

Member of Legislative Assembly
- 16th Punjab Legislative Assembly
- Incumbent Kuldeep Singh Dhaliwal
- Party: Aam Aadmi Party
- Elected year: 2022

Ajnala Assembly constituency (Sl. No.:11) is a Punjab Legislative Assembly constituency in Amritsar district, Punjab state, India.

== List of MLAs ==
Most successful parties from Ajnala Vidhan Sabha
1. INC (6 Times) (33.3%)
2. SAD (6 Times) (33.3%)
3. CPI (2 Times) (11.1%)
4. AAP (1 Time) (5.56%)
5. CPI (M) (1 Time) (5.56%)
6. IND (1 Time) (5.56%)
7. INC (I) (1 Time) (5.56%)

Members of Punjab Legislative Assembly Ajnala.

No.	Name	Portrait	Term of office		Party (Alliance)	
1	Achhar Singh Chhina		1952	1957		Communist Party of India
2	Achhar Singh Chhina		1957	1962		Communist Party of India
3	Major Harinder Singh Sandhawalia		1962	1967		Indian National Congress
4	D. Singh		1967	1969		Communist Party of India (Marxist)
5	Major Harinder Singh Sandhawalia		1969	1972		Indian National Congress
6	Harcharan Singh Ajnala		1972	1977		Indian National Congress
7	Shashpal Singh		1977	1980		Shiromani Akali Dal
8	Harcharan Singh Ajnala		1980	1985		Indian National Congress (Indira)
9	Dr. Rattan Singh		1985	1987		Shiromani Akali Dal
	President's Rule		1987	1992	-	
10	Harcharn Singh Ajnala		1992	1994		Indian National Congress
11	Dr. Rattan Singh		1994	1997		Independent
12	Dr. Rattan Singh		1997	2002		Shiromani Akali Dal
13	Dr. Rattan Singh		2002	2005		Shiromani Akali Dal
14	Harpartap Singh		2005	2007		Indian National Congress
15	Amarpal Singh Ajnala		2007	2012		Shiromani Akali Dal
16	Amarpal Singh Ajnala		2012	2017		Shiromani Akali Dal
17	Harpartap Singh		2017	2022		Indian National Congress
18	Kuldeep Singh Dhaliwal		2022	Incumbent		Aam Aadmi Party

== Election results ==
=== 2027 ===
Punjab Assembly election, 2027: Ajnala
Party	Candidate	Votes	%	±%
AAP	Kuldeep Singh Dhaliwal			
AD (WPD)				New entry
INC				
BSP				
SAD				
BJP				New entry
NOTA	None of the above			
Majority				
Turnout				

=== 2022 ===
Punjab Assembly election, 2022: Ajnala
Party	Candidate	Votes	%	±%
AAP	Kuldeep Singh Dhaliwal	43,555	35.69	▲25.14
SAD	Amarpal Singh Ajnala (Boni Ajnala)	35,712	29.26	▼6.05
INC	Harpratap Singh Ajnala	33,853	27.74	▼23.05
SAD(A)	Amrik Singh	2,185	1.79	▲1.48
NOTA	None of the above	824	0.68	
Majority		7,843	6.43	
Turnout		122,038	76.9	
Registered electors		158,691		
AAP gain from INC		Swing		

=== 2017 ===
Punjab Assembly election, 2017: Ajnala
Party	Candidate	Votes	%	±%
INC	Harpratap Singh Ajnala	61,378	50.79	
SAD	Amarpal Singh Ajnala	42,665	35.31	
AAP	Rajpreet Singh	12,749	10.55	
BSP	Balwinder Singh	860	0.71	
Independent	Rattan Singh	502	0.42	
CPI(M)	Gurnam Singh	411	0.34	
Independent	Dhanwant Singh	404	0.33	
SAD(A)	Amrik Singh	380	0.31	
Independent	Nirmal Singh	308	0.25	
NOTA	None of the above	641	0.40	
Majority		18,713	15.5	
Turnout		1,20,846	82.4	
Registered electors		147,471		

=== Previous Results ===
Year	A C No.	Name	Party	Votes	Runner Up	Party	Votes	Margin
2012	11	Amarpal Singh Ajnala	Shiromani Akali Dal	55864	Harpartap Singh	Indian National Congress	54629	1235
2007	19	Amarpal Singh Ajnala	Shiromani Akali Dal	56560	Harpartap Singh	Indian National Congress	46359	10201
2005	19	Harpartap Singh	Indian National Congress	66661	Amarpal Singh Ajnala	Shiromani Akali Dal	47415	19246
2002	20	Rattan Singh Ajnala	Shiromani Akali Dal	47182	Harpartap Singh	Indian National Congress	46826	356
1997	20	Rattan Singh Ajnala	Shiromani Akali Dal	50705	Rajbir Singh	Indian National Congress	48994	1711
1994	20	Rattan Singh Ajnala	Shiromani Akali Dal	46856	Rajbir Singh	Indian National Congress	36542	10314
1992	20	Harcharn Singh	Indian National Congress	8893	Bhagwan Dass	Bhartiya Janta Party	1461	7432
1985	20	Rattan Singh Ajnala	Shiromani Akali Dal	35552	Ajaib Singh	Indian National Congress	16594	18958
1980	20	Harcharan Singh	Indian National Congress	27840	Shashpal Singh	Shiromani Akali Dal	24399	3441
1977	20	Shashpal Singh	Shiromani Akali Dal	28627	Harcharan Singh	Indian National Congress	26591	2036
1972	29	Harcharan Singh	Indian National Congress	41045	Dalip Singh	Communist Party of India (Marxist)	15918	25127
1969	29	Major Harinder Singh Sandhawalia	Indian National Congress	27642	Dalip Singh	Communist Party of India (Marxist)	21716	5926
1967	29	Dalip Singh	Communist Party of India (Marxist)	20932	Inderjit Singh	Indian National Congress	12385	8547
1962	119	Major Harinder Singh Sandhawalia	Indian National Congress	33236	Dalip Singh	Communist Party of India	12089	21147
1957	69	Achhar Singh	Communist Party of India	11649	Shashpal Singh	Shiromani Akali Dal	10988	661
1951	86	Achhar Singh	Communist Party of India	10458	Harinder Singh	Shiromani Akali Dal	10354	104

== See also ==
- Punjab Legislative Assembly
