= Ravjot Singh =

Indian politician

MLA, Punjab Legislative Assembly
- Incumbent
- Assumed office 2022
- Constituency: Sham Chaurasi
- Majority: Aam Aadmi Party

Personal details
- Party: Aam Aadmi Party

Dr. Ravjot Singh is an Indian politician and the MLA representing the Sham Chaurasi Assembly constituency in the Punjab Legislative Assembly. He is a member of the Aam Aadmi Party.

== Career ==
Ravjot is a doctor and runs a private hospital, Ravjot Hospital & Cardiac Centre in model town area of Hoshiarpur city.

== MLA ==
He was elected in 2022. The Aam Aadmi Party gained a strong 79% majority in the sixteenth Punjab Legislative Assembly by winning 92 out of 117 seats in the 2022 Punjab Legislative Assembly election. MP Bhagwant Mann was sworn in as Chief Minister on 16 March 2022.

Committee assignments of Punjab Legislative Assembly

- Member (2022–23) Committee on Subordinate Legislation
- Member (2022–23) House Committee

== Electoral performance ==
-->

Punjab Assembly election, 2022: Sham Chaurasi
| Party | Candidate | Votes | % | ±% |
|---|---|---|---|---|
| AAP | Dr. Ravjot Singh | 60,730 | 49.4 | |
| INC | Pawan Kumar Adia | 39,374 | 32.0 | |
| BSP | Mohinder Singh Sandhar | 13,512 | 11.0 | |
| NOTA | None of the above | 1,095 | 0.6 | |
| Majority | | 21,356 | 17.22 | |
| Turnout | | 124,024 | 69.3 | |
| Registered electors | | 178,914 | | |

State Legislative Assembly
| Preceded by - | Member of the Punjab Legislative Assembly from Sham Chaurasi Assembly constituency 2022 – | Incumbent |
