= Sham Chaurasi Assembly constituency =

Legislative Assembly constituency in Punjab State, India

Coordinates: 31.5°N 75.75°E

Sham Chaurasi
- Constituency No. 42 for the Punjab Legislative Assembly

Constituency details
- Country: India
- State: Punjab
- District: Hoshiarpur
- Lok Sabha constituency: Hoshiarpur
- Total electors: 178,919
- Reservation: SC

Member of Legislative Assembly
- 16th Punjab Legislative Assembly
- Incumbent Dr. Ravjot Singh
- Party: Aam Aadmi Party
- Elected year: 2022

Sham Chaurasi is one of the 117 Legislative Assembly constituencies of Punjab state in India. It is part of Hoshiarpur district and is reserved for candidates belonging to the Scheduled Castes.

== Members of the Legislative Assembly ==
Most successful parties from Sham Chaurasi Vidhan Sabha
1. INC (6 Times) (46.2%)
2. SAD (3 Time) (23.1%)
3. AAP (1 Time) (7.69%)
4. BSP (1 Time) (7.69%)
5. CPI (M) (1 Time) (7.69%)
6. INC (I) (1 Time) (7.69%)

Year	Member	Party
1967	Guran Dass	Indian National Congress
1969	Guran Dass	Indian National Congress
1972	Guran Dass	Indian National Congress
1977	Dev Raj Nasrala	Communist Party of India (Marxist)
1980	Hari Mittar Hans	Indian National Congress (Indira)
1985	Hari Mittar Hans	Indian National Congress
1992	Gurpal Chand	Bahujan Samaj Party
1997	Arjan Singh Josh	Shiromani Akali Dal
2002	Ram Lubhaya	Indian National Congress
2007	Mohinder Kaur Josh	Shiromani Akali Dal
2012	Mohinder Kaur Josh	Shiromani Akali Dal
2017	Pawan Kumar Adia	Indian National Congress
2022	Dr. Ravjot Singh	Aam Aadmi Party

== Election results ==
=== 2027 ===
Punjab Assembly election, 2027: Sham Chaurasi
Party	Candidate	Votes	%	±%
AAP				
AD (WPD)				New entry
INC				
BSP				
SAD				New entry
BJP				New entry
NOTA	None of the above			
Majority				
Turnout				

=== 2022 ===
Punjab Assembly election, 2022: Sham Chaurasi
Party	Candidate	Votes	%	±%
AAP	Dr. Ravjot Singh	60,730	49.4	
INC	Pawan Kumar Adia	39,374	32.0	
BSP	Mohinder Singh Sandhar	13,512	11.0	
Independent	Karamjit Singh Bablu Josh	3,459	2.8	
SAD(S)	Des Raj Dhugga	3,152	2.6	
NOTA	None of the above	1,095	0.6	
Majority		21,356	17.22	
Turnout		124,024	69.3	
Registered electors		178,914		

=== 2017 ===
Punjab Assembly election, 2017: Sham Chaurasi
Party	Candidate	Votes	%	±%
INC	Pawan Kumar Adia	46,612	37.6	
AAP	Dr. Ravjot Singh	42,797	34.5	
SAD	Mohinder Kaur Josh	24,671	19.9	
NOTA	None of the above	898	0.5	
Majority		3,815	3.1	
Turnout		122,991	74.3	
Registered electors		166,750		

=== 2012 ===
Punjab Assembly election, 2012: Sham Chaurasi
Party	Candidate	Votes	%	±%
SAD	Mohinder Kaur Josh	43,360	38.6	
INC	Chaudhary Ram Lubhaya	38,054	33.9	
BSP	Samittar Singh Sikri	22,429	19.9	
Majority		5,306	4.7	
Turnout		112,202	75.5	
Registered electors		148,622		

== See also ==
- List of constituencies of the Punjab Legislative Assembly
- Hoshiarpur district
