= Ramesh Chander =

Malaysian economist (1935–2023)

Datuk Ramesh Chander (19 August 1935 – 13 November 2023) was a Malaysian development economist and statistician. He served as the Chief Statistician of Malaysia, and Statistical Adviser at the World Bank.

Chander pioneered the development of the Malaysian statistical system and was instrumental in the development of the New Economic Policy after 1969. In 1977, he was invited to join the World Bank as its Statistical Adviser. At the Bank, he designed the World Bank's flagship statistical abstract, the World Development Indicators. In his capacity as the Statistical Adviser, he was actively engaged in statistical capacity-building in member countries. He also played a major role in the development of statistical standards, which included the 1993 System of National Accounts and the methodology for the World Bank's Living Standards Measurement Survey program for collecting household data.

After retiring from the World Bank in 1996, he became an independent consultant and took on several assignments. He founded an independent consultancy named the Cresset Research Group (CRG). The CRG was actively engaged in advising international development institutions and countries in the creation of sustainable statistical systems.

== Early years and education ==
Born in Kuantan, Pahang, Ramesh Chander had a challenging childhood conditioned by the Japanese Occupation of Malaya during the Second World War and the disruptions associated with the early years of the Malayan Emergency.

In 1953, he completed secondary school at Abdullah School, Kuantan, whereupon he went on to the Queen’s University of Belfast in Northern Ireland. He graduated with an honors degree in Economics, Politics and Philosophy in 1958. In later years, he completed the Advanced Management Program at the Wharton School of Business at the University of Pennsylvania.

== Chief Statistician of Malaysia ==
In 1958, he returned to a newly independent Malaya and joined the Federal Department of Statistics as an economic statistician. In 1963 at age 28, he was appointed the Chief Statistician of Malaya, becoming the first Malaysian national to hold the position. He was also the youngest head of a Federal department at the time and worked closely with the country's founding Prime Minister, Tunku Abdul Rahman.

As the Chief Statistician, he developed a fully functioning statistical system. He pioneered the use of integrated household surveys for the collection of information for poverty analysis and the compilation of socio-economic indicators. He also carried out the landmark 1970 Census of Population and Housing. The Chief Statistician was a key player in the formulation of economic policies. He was part of the team that developed the New Economic Policy, which was the basis for Malaysia's affirmative action policies promoting ethnic Malay advancement.

=== Landmark 1970 census ===
In 1968, he began planning the 1970 Census, the first to be undertaken after Malaysian independence. After the May 1969 race riots in Malaysia, the Census became a politically sensitive project as the data would bring to light disparities among the country's ethnic groups. The successful Census undertaking was particularly challenging as there was no institutional memory from prior national censuses.

Under his leadership, the Census was innovative in several ways. Using the latest available computing technology in the Malaysian government, the Census pioneered the use of new optical scanning technology. The Malaysian approach was adopted by other countries in the region. By the early 1970s, the Malaysian statistical system had come of age. It not only generated a full range of quality data but had a growing research capacity. With the available data, Malaysia was able to engage in collaborative studies with the World Bank and other institutions.

The Census formed a key data source for the development of Malaysia's New Economic Policy, which promoted affirmative action for ethnic Malays in order to avoid the political strife that led to the 1969 riots. He also developed a framework for monitoring New Economic Policy targets and goals.

=== Economic development ===
Chander developed the Malaysian statistical system from a small entity of 200 persons to 2000 persons between 1963 and 1977 through a systematic expansion program for producing policy-relevant statistics. As a result, the Malaysian statistical system became a recognized and respected institution in the international statistical system.

Chander played an active role both within the region and globally:

- Chair of the Conference of Asian Statisticians
- Elected to the UN Statistical Commission, serving as a Vice–Chair from 1972 to 1976
- Malaysian representative at the Commonwealth Conference of Statisticians
- Founding member of the Statistical Institute for Asia and the Pacific (SIAP) for training statistical personnel from all countries in the region; served as member of the Governing Council of the Institute
- Member of the Technical Committee for the World Fertility Survey

== World Bank ==
In 1977, Robert McNamara, President of the World Bank approached the Government of Malaysia, for the services of Datuk Chander to join a team that was to produce a new flagship publication called the World Development Report.

=== World Development Indicators ===
Chander designed the World Development Indicators, an annex to the World Development Report. The Indicators became a model adopted by other international organizations in presenting statistical data.

=== China, the former Soviet Union, and other developing economies ===
In 1980, he pioneered the estimation of the Gross National Product of China. He reviewed the functioning of the Chinese statistical system. Later his work improved the statistical capacities of African and transition countries, and he advised on adjustment and reform issues. He also managed and coordinated technical assistance programs for statistics to countries of the former Soviet Union, China, Mongolia, the Philippines, India, Pakistan, Nepal, Brazil, and others.

With the adoption of the reform and opening up in China and the economic reforms in former Soviet Union, the statistical systems of each centrally planned economy had to be adapted to meet the needs of their emerging market economies. For instance, neither country measured economic growth in terms of GNP or GDP prior to the reforms; thus his work served to transform the collection and use of economic data in these countries.

Further work included the conceptualization of approaches to estimating Purchasing Power Parities using limited information sets and the promotion of the initiative globally. He developed the strategy and methodology for measuring poverty incidence through integrated household surveys, now known as the World Bank's Living Standards Measurement Surveys. In 1993, he provided substantive contributions to the revision of the System of National Accounts, and later he led the effort to reform statistical cooperation arrangements in the UN interagency system.

=== Statistical Adviser, principal policy adviser on statistics ===
As the World Bank's Statistical Adviser, he was the principal policy adviser on statistics to senior managers of the World Bank and the World Bank’s spokesperson and chief representative at international meetings including the UN Statistical Commission. As the Statistical Adviser, he collaborated with the World Bank's Chief Economist and Vice President, Development Economics, positions held by Stanley Fischer and Lawrence Summers. He was responsible for the formulation of the Bank's statistical policy, standards and delivery of technical assistance in statistics to member countries.

== Advisory work ==
Upon retiring from the World Bank in late 1996, he took on several high-level short-term advisory assignments:

- UN: advised the President of the UN General Assembly on UN reform issues
- ASEAN: created strategies for regional economic integration
- Commonwealth Secretariat: undertook major study on the East Asian Economic crisis for Commonwealth Ministers of Finance
- CIDA Canada: designed long-term multi-million-dollar technical assistance program for the modernization of China’s statistical system
- China’s National Development and Reform Commission: created framework for monitoring and evaluating China’s 10th Five Year Plan
- Government of China: advised on establishing the Boao Forum, analogous to the World Economic Forum in Davos, Switzerland

Chander also developed for the World Bank a framework for preparation of Strategic Master Plans, a pre-requisite for Bank and other donor financing of capacity-building programs. He founded an independent research consultancy that has specialized in the preparation of Statistical Master Plans /National Strategies for Development of Statistics. These Plans for over a dozen countries, including Afghanistan provided the basis for loans and credits from the World Bank for statistical capacity building.

Chander was an elected member of the International Statistical Institute, an academy of professional statisticians.

Chander commented on contemporary Malaysian politics and policymaking. His last publication was China's Statistical System: Three Decades of Change and Transformation.

== Death ==
Ramesh Chander died on 13 November 2023, at the age of 88.

== Honours and awards ==
- Malaysia : Companion of the Order of the Defender of the Realm (J.M.N.) (1971)
- D.I.M.P. (Darjah lndera Makhota Pahang) by H.R.H the Sultan of Pahang for Public Services (State Knighthood) carrying the title “Datuk”.
- Honorary Professor, Xian National Institute of Statistics, Xian, China.
