= Karambir Singh Ghuman =

Indian politician

MLA, Punjab Legislative Assembly
- Incumbent
- Assumed office 2022
- Constituency: Dasuya
- Majority: Aam Aadmi Party

Personal details
- Party: Aam Aadmi Party

Karambir Singh Ghuman is an Indian politician and the MLA representing the Dasuya Assembly constituency in the Punjab Legislative Assembly. He is a member of the Aam Aadmi Party.

== MLA ==
He was elected in 2022. The Aam Aadmi Party gained a strong 79% majority in the sixteenth Punjab Legislative Assembly by winning 92 out of 117 seats in the 2022 Punjab Legislative Assembly election. MP Bhagwant Mann was sworn in as Chief Minister on 16 March 2022.

Committee assignments of Punjab Legislative Assembly

- Member (2022–23) Committee on Subordinate Legislation
- Member (2022–23) House Committee

== Electoral performance ==
Punjab Assembly election, 2022: Dasuya
Party	Candidate	Votes	%	±%
AAP	Karamvir Singh Ghumman	43,272	32.42	
INC	Arun Dogra	34,865	25.99	
BJP	Raghunath Singh Rana	25,632	19.21	
BSP	Susheel Kumar Sharma	22,883	17.15	
SAD(A)	Sukhwinder Singh	3,429	2.57	
NOTA	None of the above	1,031	0.62	
Majority		8,587	6.43	
Turnout				
Registered electors		197,021		

State Legislative Assembly
Preceded by -	Member of the Punjab Legislative Assembly from Dasuya Assembly constituency 2022 –	Incumbent
