= Amarpal Singh Ajnala =

Indian politician

MLA, Punjab
- In office 2007 - 2017
- Preceded by: Harpartap Singh Ajnala
- Succeeded by: Harpartap Singh Ajnala
- Constituency: Ajnala

Personal details
- Party: Bharatiya Janata Party (2023-present)
- Other political affiliations: Shiromani Akali Dal (2020-2023); Shiromani Akali Dal (Taksali) (2018–2020)
- Spouse: Anu Ajnala
- Children: 2 daughters

Amarpal Singh Ajnala alias Boni Ajnala is an Indian politician and belongs to the Bhartiya Janta Party. He was a member of Punjab Legislative Assembly and represented Ajnala.

For a short while he joined Shiromani Akali Dal (Taksali).

== Family ==
He is son of Rattan Singh Ajnala, a 3 time MLA from Ajnala & former MP Khadoor Sahib Loksabha.

== Political career ==
Ajnala first contested Punjab Legislative Assembly in Ajnala constituency by-election in 2004 but was defeated. However he was successful during 2007 Punjab elections. He was re-elected in 2012.

== Electoral performance ==
Punjab Assembly election, 2022: Ajnala
Party	Candidate	Votes	%	±%
AAP	Kuldeep Singh Dhaliwal	43,555	35.69	▲25.14
SAD	Amarpal Singh Ajnala (Boni Ajnala)	35,712	29.26	▼6.05
INC	Harpratap Singh Ajnala	33,853	27.74	▼23.05
SAD(A)	Amrik Singh	2,185	1.79	▲1.48
NOTA	None of the above	824	0.68	
Majority		7,843	6.43	
Turnout		122,038	76.9	
Registered electors		158,691		
AAP gain from INC		Swing		
