= Rana Gurmit Singh Sodhi =

Former Minister in Government of Punjab (India)

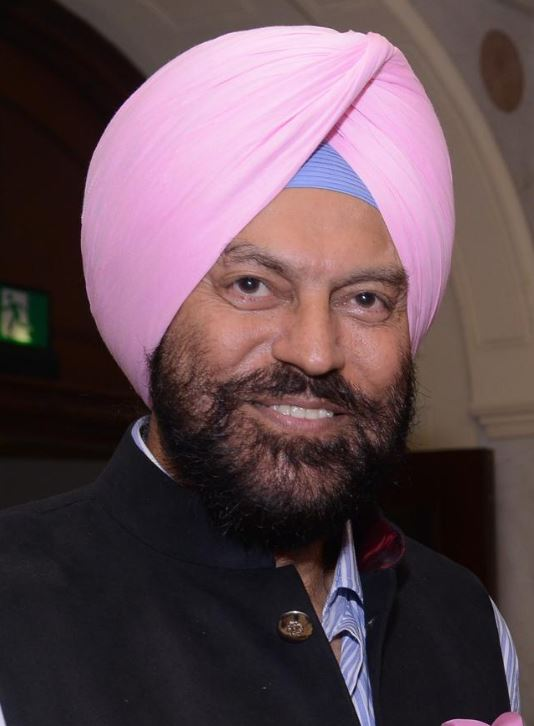

Minister of Sports and Youth Affairs Government of Punjab
- In office 21 April 2018 – 18 September 2021
- Chief Minister: Amarinder Singh
- Succeeded by: Pargat Singh

Member of Punjab Legislative Assembly
- In office 2002 – 11 March 2022
- Preceded by: Paramjit Singh
- Constituency: Guru Har Sahai

Personal details
- Born: 9 January 1954 (age 72) Firozpur, Punjab
- Party: Bharatiya Janata Party (2021-present)
- Other political affiliations: Indian National Congress (till 2021)
- Spouse: Rita Sodhi
- Parents: Narjit Singh Sodhi (father); Raj Kumari (mother)

Rana Gurmit Singh Sodhi (born 9 January 1954) is an Indian politician, a Bharatiya Janata Party leader in Punjab and a former international shooter. Sodhi was earlier in the Indian National Congress and has been a Member of the Punjab Legislative Assembly (MLA) from the Guru Har Sahai in Firozpur district of Punjab from 2002 to 2022.

== Political career ==
During Sodhi's time as a member of the Indian National Congress (INC), he became a member of the Indian Youth Congress in 1976.

Sodhi had been elected to the Punjab Vidhan Sabha in 2002, 2007, 2012 and 2017 consecutively. Prior to this, he also functioned as Chief Whip of the Congress Legislative Party. In April 2018, he was inducted into the Government of Punjab as a Cabinet Minister for Sports and Youth Affairs.

Before the 2022 Punjab Legislative Assembly election, Sodhi resigned from INC and joined the Bharatiya Janata Party (BJP) in December 2021. Sodhi was the Sports Minister in the former Punjab Chief Minister Amarinder Singh's Cabinet, but was excluded from the new chief minister Charanjit Singh Channi’s ministry.

=== Double compensation case ===
He is named in the double compensation scams related to land acquired by the government. An inter-departmental committee under the Chief Secretary had in 2020 indicted the minister for taking double compensation for land acquired at Mohan Ke Uttar village in Ferozepur during the previous SAD-BJP government in July 2014. A case for recovery of rupees 1.83 crores is pending in the Supreme Court of India. Cases of double compensation scams related to land acquired by the Government of India (of Rupees 1.83 crores) are pending against him in the Supreme Court of India.
