= Jangi Lal Mahajan =

Indian politician

Jangi Lal Mahajan (born 1948) is an Indian politician from Punjab. He is an MLA from Mukerian Assembly constituency in Hoshiarpur District. He won the 2022 Punjab Legislative Assembly election, representing the Bharatiya Janata Party.

== Early life and education ==
Mahajan is from Mukerian, Hoshiarpur District, Punjab. He is the son of Om Parkash. He passed Class 10 in 1964. He passed Class 10 examinations conducted by Punjab School Education Board, Mohali in 1964.

== Career ==
Mahajan won from Mukerian Assembly constituency representing the Bharatiya Janata Party in the 2022 Punjab Legislative Assembly election. He polled 41,044 votes. In the 2019 Punjab Legislative Assembly by election, he was very close to victory but eventually didn’t win as it was a by election and was fought against the sitting Indian Nation Congress government.
