= Mukerian Assembly constituency =

Legislative Assembly constituency in Punjab State, India

Coordinates: 31.95°N 75.62°E

Mukerian
- Constituency No. 39 for the Punjab Legislative Assembly

Constituency details
- Country: India
- State: Punjab
- District: Mukerian
- Lok Sabha constituency: Hoshiarpur
- Established: 1951
- Total electors: 202,924
- Reservation: None

Member of Legislative Assembly
- 16th Punjab Legislative Assembly
- Incumbent Jangi Lal Mahajan
- Party: BJP
- Alliance: NDA
- Elected year: 2022

Mukerian is a Punjab Legislative Assembly constituency in Mukerian district, Punjab state, India. Illegal mining, drugs and 3 farm laws were the major issues in the constituency in 2022 elections.

== Members of the Legislative Assembly ==
Most successful parties from Mukerian Vidhan Sabha
1. INC (12 Times) (70.6%)
2. BJP (3 Times) (17.6%)
3. IND (1 Time) (5.88%)
4. INC (I) (1 Time) (5.88%)

| Year | Member | Party |
|---|---|---|
| 1952 | Ralla Ram | Indian National Congress |
| 1957 | Ralla Ram | Indian National Congress |
| 1957 | Guran Dass | Indian National Congress |
| 1962 | Ralla Ram | Indian National Congress |
| 1967 | B. Nath | Independent |
| 1969 | Dr. Kewal Krishan | Indian National Congress |
| 1972 | Dr. Kewal Krishan | Indian National Congress |
| 1977 | Dr. Kewal Krishan | Indian National Congress |
| 1980 | Dr. Kewal Krishan | Indian National Congress (Indira) |
| 1985 | Dr. Kewal Krishan | Indian National Congress |
| 1992 | Dr. Kewal Krishan | Indian National Congress |
| 1997 | Arunesh Kumar | Bharatiya Janta Party |
| 2002 | Dr. Kewal Krishan | Indian National Congress |
| 2007 | Arunesh Kumar | Bharatiya Janta Party |
| 2012 | Rajnish Kumar Babbi | Indian National Congress |
| 2017 | Rajnish Kumar Babbi | Indian National Congress |
| 2019 (Note: bypoll due to the death of Rajnish Kumar Babbi) | Indu Bala | Indian National Congress |
| 2022 | Jangi Lal Mahajan | Bharatiya Janata Party |

== Election results ==
=== 2027 ===
Punjab Assembly election, 2027: Mukerian
| Party | Candidate | Votes | % | ±% |
|---|---|---|---|---|
| AAP | Sarabjot Singh Saabi | | | |
| BJP | Jangi Lal Mahajan | | | |
| INC | | | | |
| IND | Gurdhian Singh Multani | | | |
| SAD | | | | |
| AD (WPD) | | | | New entry |
| NOTA | None of the above | | | |
| Majority | | | | |
| Turnout | | | | |

=== 2022 ===
Punjab Assembly election, 2022: Mukerian
| Party | Candidate | Votes | % | ±% |
|---|---|---|---|---|
| BJP | Jangi Lal Mahajan | 41,044 | 28.64 | |
| AAP | Prof. Gurdhian Singh Multani | 38,353 | 26.76 | |
| INC | Indu Bala | 28,989 | 20.23 | |
| SAD | Sarbjot Singh | 28,984 | 20.23 | |
| NOTA | None of the above | 851 | 0.4 | |
| Majority | | 2,691 | 1.88 | |
| Turnout | | 143,300 | 68.9 | |
| Registered electors | | 208,063 | | |

=== 2019 bypoll ===
A by-poll was needed due to the death of sitting MLA Rajnish Kumar Babbi.

2019 by-poll: Mukerian
| Party | Candidate | Votes | % | ±% |
|---|---|---|---|---|
| INC | Indu Bala | 53,910 | | |
| BJP | Jangi Lal Mahajan | 50,470 | | |
| AAP | GS Multani | 8,261 | | |
| SAD(A) | Gurvatan Singh Multani | 1,286 | | |
| Hindustan Shakti Sena | Arjun | 558 | | |
| Independent | Amandeep Ghotra | 268 | | |
| NOTA | None of the above | 879 | | |
| Majority | | 3,440 | | |
| Turnout | | | | |
| Registered electors | | | | |

=== 2017 ===
Punjab Assembly election, 2017: Mukerian
| Party | Candidate | Votes | % | ±% |
|---|---|---|---|---|
| INC | Rajnish Kumar Babbi | 56,787 | 41.80 | |
| BJP | Arunesh Kumar | 33,661 | 24.80 | |
| Independent | Jangi Lal Mahajan | 20,542 | 15.1 | |
| AAP | Sulakhan Singh | 17,005 | 12.5 | |
| NOTA | None of the above | 1,018 | 0.5 | |
| Majority | | 23,126 | 17.1 | |
| Turnout | | 134,883 | 70.7 | |
| Registered electors | | 192,217 | | |

== See also ==
- List of constituencies of the Punjab Legislative Assembly
- Hoshiarpur district
