= Chabbewal Assembly constituency =

Legislative Assembly constituency in Punjab State, India

Coordinates: 31.44°N 75.98°E

Chabbewal
- Constituency No. 44 for the Punjab Legislative Assembly

Constituency details
- Country: India
- State: Punjab
- District: Hoshiarpur
- Lok Sabha constituency: Hoshiarpur
- Total electors: 161,535 (in 2022)
- Reservation: SC

Member of Legislative Assembly
- 16th Punjab Legislative Assembly
- Incumbent Ishank Kumar Chabbewal
- Party: Aam Aadmi Party
- Elected year: By-Election 2024

Chabbewal is a Punjab Legislative Assembly constituency in Hoshiarpur district, Punjab state, India.

== Members of the Legislative Assembly ==
Most successful parties from Chabbewal Vidhan Sabha
1. INC (2 Times) (50.0%)
2. AAP (1 Time) (25.0%)
3. SAD (1 Time) (25.0%)

Year	Member	Party
2012	Sohan Singh Thandal	Shiromani Akali Dal
2017	Raj Kumar Chabbewal	Indian National Congress
2022	Raj Kumar Chabbewal	Indian National Congress
2024*	Ishank Kumar Chabbewal	Aam Aadmi Party

- By-election

== Election results ==
=== 2027 ===
Punjab Assembly election, 2027: Chabbewal
Party	Candidate	Votes	%	±%
AAP	Ishank Kumar Chabbewal			
AD (WPD)				New entry
INC				
BSP				
SAD				New entry
BJP				
NOTA	None of the above			
Majority				
Turnout				

=== 2024 by-election ===
Punjab Legislative Assembly by-election 2024: Chabbewal
Party	Candidate	Votes	%	±%
AAP	Ishank Kumar Chabbewal	51,904	60.78	▲26.08
INC	Ranjit Kumar	23,314	27.18	▼14.22
BJP	Sohan Singh Thandal	8,692	10.18	▲6.58
NOTA	None of the Above	884	1.04	
Majority		28,690	33.6	
Turnout		85,403	53.43	
AAP gain from INC		Swing		

=== 2022 ===
Punjab Assembly election, 2022: Chabbewal
Party	Candidate	Votes	%	±%
INC	Raj Kumar Chabbewal	47,375	41.4	▼8.56
AAP	Harminder Singh Sandhu	39,729	34.7	▲17.00
SAD	Sohan Singh Thandal	19,329	16.9	▼7.79
BJP	Dilbag Rai	4,073	3.6	New
NOTA	None of the above	981	0.6	▼0.13
Majority		7,646	6.62	
Turnout		115,506	71.2	
Registered electors		161,535		
INC hold		Swing		

=== 2017 ===
Punjab Assembly election, 2017: Chabbewal
Party	Candidate	Votes	%	±%
INC	Raj Kumar Chabbewal	57,857	49.96	▲13.14
SAD	Sohan Singh Thandal	28,596	24.69	▼18.05
AAP	Raman Kumar	20,505	17.7	New entry
BSP	Gurlal Singh	5,585	4.82	▼7.16
NOTA	None of the above	842	0.73	
Registered electors		156,141		
INC gain from SAD		Swing		

=== 2012 ===
Punjab Assembly election, 2012: Chabbewal
Party	Candidate	Votes	%	±%
SAD	Sohan Singh Thandal	45,100	42.74	New entry
INC	Raj Kumar Chabbewal	38,854	36.82	New entry
BSP	Gurnam Singh	12,637	11.98	New entry
Independent	Dr. Dilbag Rai	4,569	4.33	New entry
Registered electors		138,706		
