= Sohan Singh Thandal =

Indian politician

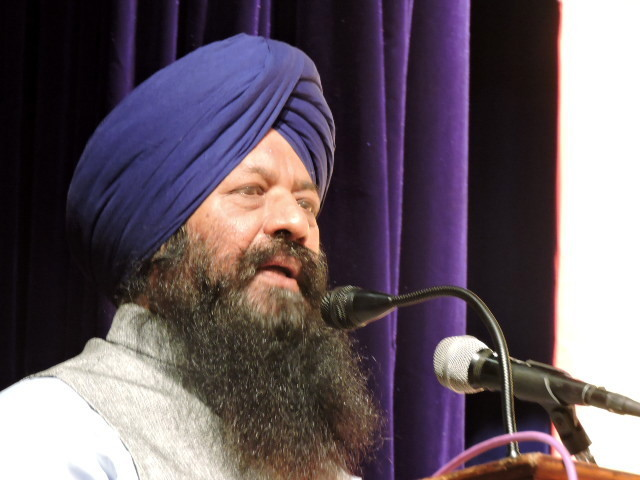

Minister Government of Punjab for Jails Tourism Cultural Affairs Tourism Archives & Museums
- In office 2014–2017
- Constituency: Chabbewal Assembly Constituency

Member of the Punjab Legislative Assembly
- In office 2012–2017

Personal details
- Party: Shiromani Akali Dal
- Occupation: Politician

Sohan Singh Thandal is an Indian politician and government minister from the state of Punjab.

== Constituency ==
Thandal represents the Chabbewal Assembly Constituency of Punjab. He is a Shiromani Akali Dal Candidate for Hoshiarpur Lok Sabha constituency for the 2024 Indian general election.

== Political Party ==
Thandal is a member of Shiromani Akali Dal.

== Controversy ==
Thandal was convicted in a criminal misconduct, corruption, and disproportionate assets case, but was later acquitted by a higher court.
