= Swarna Ram =

Indian politician (died 2023)

Minister Government of Punjab for Technical Education Industrial Training Social Security
- In office 2007–2012

Deputy speaker of the Punjab Legislative Assembly
- In office 18 June 1997 – 26 July 1997

Personal details
- Born: 1939/1940
- Died: 1 April 2023 (aged 83)
- Party: Bharatiya Janata Party
- Occupation: Politician

Swarna Ram (Punjabi: ਸਵਰਨਾ ਰਾਮ; 1939/1940 – 1 April 2023) was an Indian politician from the state of Punjab. He was a minister from 2007 to 2012 for Technical Education, Industrial Training and Social Security in the Punjab government and the deputy speaker of the Punjab Legislative Assembly from 18 June 1997 to 26 July 1997.

== Constituency ==
Ram represented the Phagwara assembly constituency from 1997 to 2002 and 2007 to 2012.

== Political party ==
Ram was a member of Bharatiya Janata Party.
