= History of Punjab Legislative Assembly =

Legislature of Punjab, India

Punjab Legislative Assembly Punjab Vidhan Sabha
- 16th Punjab Assembly

Type
- Type: Unicameral
- Term limits: None

History
- Founded: 3 May 1952 (74 years ago)
- Preceded by: Interim East Punjab Assembly

Leadership
- Speaker: Kultar Singh Sandhwan, AAP since 21 March 2022
- Deputy Speaker: Jai Krishan, AAP since 30 June 2022
- Leader of the House (Chief Minister): Bhagwant Mann, AAP since 16 March 2022
- Deputy Leader of the House: Harpal Singh Cheema, AAP since 21 March 2022
- Minister of Legislative Affairs: Ravjot Singh, AAP since 23 September 2024
- Leader of the Opposition: Partap Singh Bajwa, INC since 9 April 2022
- Deputy Leader of Opposition: Aruna Chaudhary, INC since 3 September 2024

Structure
- Seats: 117
- Political groups: Government (95): AAP (95) (Note: One of the AAP MLA, Kuwar Vijay Partap Singh is suspended by Party from his anti-party activities. Thus he is not bound by the decisions of the legislative party in assembly, however, officially he is still the member of the Aam Aadmi Party as his party affiliation is yet to be decided by the speaker.); Official Opposition (16): INC (16) (Note: Two members were suspended by congress because of their anti-party activities. These are Sandeep Jakhar and Vikramjit Chaudhary, thus they are not bound by the decisions of the legislative party in assembly, however, officially they are still member of the congress as their party affiliation is yet to be decided by the speaker.); Other Opposition (6): BJP (2); SAD (1) (Note: One of the three SAD MLAs, Sukhwinder Sukhi from Banga, joined AAP on 14 August 2024. As per Anti-defection law his membership will be decided by Speaker of Punjab Assembly. Furthermore, Manpreet Singh Ayali, MLA for Dakha, officially joined the Akali Dal (Waris Punjab De) in June 2026, but for purposes of party affiliation has opted to officially remain in the SAD caucus as the AD(WPD) is not a recognized and registered political party.); AD(WPD) (1); BSP (1); IND (1)
- Committees: Agriculture Co-operation; Estimates; Government Assurances; Local Bodies; Panchayati Raj Institutions; Papers laid/to be laid on the table and Library; Petitions; Privileges; Public Undertakings; Questions & References; Subordinate Legislation; Welfare of Scheduled Castes, Scheduled Tribes and Backward Classes House Committee
- Length of term: 5 years; renewable

Elections
- Voting system: First-past-the-post
- First election: 26 March 1952
- Last election: 20 February 2022
- Next election: 2027

Meeting place
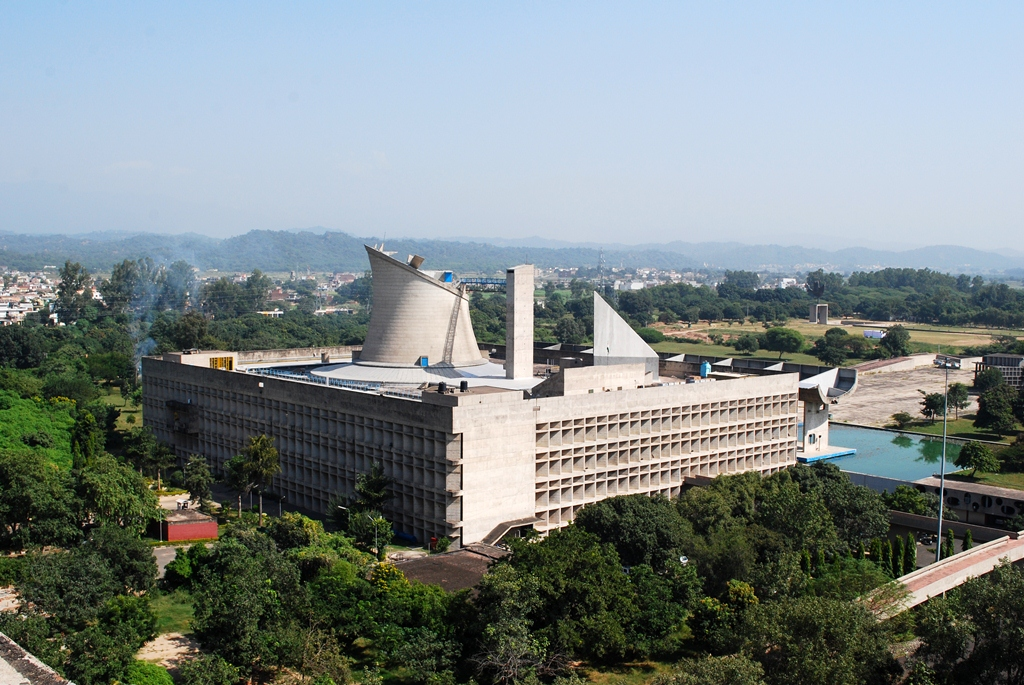
- Palace of Assembly, Chandigarh, India

Website
- Punjab Legislative Assembly

Constitution
- Constitution of India

The Punjab Legislative Assembly or the Punjab Vidhan Sabha is the unicameral legislature of the state of Punjab in India. The Sixteenth Punjab Legislative Assembly was constituted in March 2022. At present, it consists of 117 members, directly elected from 117 single-seat constituencies. The tenure of the Legislative Assembly is five years unless dissolved sooner. The current Speaker of the Assembly is Kultar Singh Sandhwan and the Secretary of the Assembly has been Mr. Surinder pal since April, 2021. The meeting place of the Legislative Assembly since 6 March 1961 is the Vidhan Bhavan in Chandigarh.

== History ==
=== British Raj ===
An Executive Council was formed under The Indian Councils Act, 1861. It was only under the Government of India Act 1919 that a Legislative Council was set up in Punjab. Later, under the Government of India Act 1935, the Punjab Legislative Assembly was constituted with a membership of 175. It was summoned for the first time on 1 April 1937. In 1947, Punjab Province was partitioned into West Punjab and East Punjab and the East Punjab Legislative Assembly was formed, the forerunner of the current assembly consisting of 79 members.

=== 1947 – present ===
On 15 July 1948, eight princely states of East Punjab grouped together to form a single state, Patiala and East Punjab States Union. The Punjab State Legislature was a bicameral house in April 1952, comprising the Vidhan Sabha (lower house) and Vidhan Parishad (upper house). In 1956 that state was largely merged into Punjab, the strength of the Vidhan Parishad of the new State of Punjab was enhanced from 40 seats to 46 seats and in 1957, it was increased to 51. Punjab was trifurcated in 1966 to form Haryana, Himachal Pradesh, and Punjab. The Vidhan Parishad was reduced to 40 seats and the Vidhan Sabha was grown by 50 seats to 104 seats. On 1 January 1970, the Vidhan Parishad was abolished leaving the state with a unicameral legislature.

== Election results ==
=== Pre-Independence ===
Punjab Legislative Council

Year				Others	Total
Year	UoP	INC	IND	Others	Total
1920	-	-	71	-	71
1923	33	0	17	21	71
1926	31	2	12	26	71
1930	37	0	14	20	71

Punjab Provincial Assembly

Year						Others	Total
Year	UoP	INC	SAD	AIML	IND	Others	Total
1937	98	18	11	2	16	30	175
1946	19	51	21	73	11	0	175

=== Post-Independence ===
Years	Majority						Others	Total
Years	Majority	INC	SAD	AAP	BJP	IND	Others	Total
1952	INC	96	13	~	~	9	8	126
1957	INC	120	^	~	~	13	21	154
1962	INC	90	19	~	~	18	27	154
1967	INC	48	^	~	~	9	47	104
1969	SAD	38	43	~	~	4	17	104
1972	INC	66	24	~	~	3	11	104
1977	SAD	17	58	~	~	2	40	117
1980	INC	63	37	~	1	2	14	117
1985	SAD	32	73	~	6	4	2	117
1992	INC	87	^	~	6	4	20	117
1997	SAD	14	75	~	18	6	4	117
2002	INC	62	41	~	3	9	2	117
2007	SAD	44	49	~	19	5	0	117
2012	SAD	46	56	~	12	3	0	117
2017	INC	77	15	20	3	0	2	117
2022	AAP	18	3	92	2	1	1	117

- ^ - Party didn't contest election
- ~ - Party didn't exist
- Green color box indicates the party/parties who formed the government
- Red color box indicates the official opposition party

== List of Assemblies ==
=== Council of Lieutenant-Governor of Punjab (1897-1920) ===
Council of Lieutenant-Governor of Punjab (1897-1920)
Council (Tenure)	Lieutenant-Governor (President of Council)	Tenure (Presiding dates)
1st (1 November 1898 – 3 July 1909)	William Mackworth Young	1 November 1897 – 6 March 1902
1st (1 November 1898 – 3 July 1909)	Sir Charles Montgomery Rivaz	6 March 1902 – 6 March 1907
1st (1 November 1898 – 3 July 1909)	Sir Denzil Charles Jelf Ibbetson	6 March 1907 - 26 May 1907
1st (1 November 1898 – 3 July 1909)	Sir Denzil Charles Jelf Ibbetson	12 August 1907 - 22 January 1908
1st (1 November 1898 – 3 July 1909)	Sir Louis William Dane	25 May 1908 - 3 January 1910
2nd (3 January 1910 – 14 December 1912)	Sir Louis William Dane	3 January 1910 - 28 April 1911
2nd (3 January 1910 – 14 December 1912)	Sir Louis William Dane	4 August 1911 - 14 December 1912
2nd (3 January 1910 – 14 December 1912)	Sir Louis William Dane	14 December 1912 - 4 January 1913
3rd (4 January 1913 – 19 April 1916)	Sir Louis William Dane	4 January 1913 – 26 May 1913
3rd (4 January 1913 – 19 April 1916)	Sir Michael Francis O'Dwyer	26 May 1913 – 12 June 1916
4th (12 June 1916 – 6 April 1920)	Sir Michael Francis O'Dwyer	12 June 1916 – 26 May 1919
4th (12 June 1916 – 6 April 1920)	Sir Edward Douglas Maclagan	26 May 1919 – 6 April 1920

=== Punjab Legislative Council (1921-1936) ===
Punjab Legislative Council (1921-1936)
Council (Tenure)	President	Tenure		Governor
1st (8 January 1921 – 27 October 1923)	Montagu Sherard Dawes Butler	8 January 1921	21 March 1922	Sir Edward Douglas Maclagan
1st (8 January 1921 – 27 October 1923)	Herbert Alexander Casson	10 May 1922	27 October 1923	Sir Edward Douglas Maclagan
2nd (2 January 1924 – 27 October 1926)	Herbert Alexander Casson	2 January 1924	16 January 1925	Sir Edward Douglas Maclagan and Sir William Malcolm Hailey
2nd (2 January 1924 – 27 October 1926)	Sheikh Abdul Qadir	16 January 1925	4 September 1925	Sir Edward Douglas Maclagan and Sir William Malcolm Hailey
2nd (2 January 1924 – 27 October 1926)	Sir Shahab-ud-Din Virk	3 December 1925	27 October 1926	Sir Edward Douglas Maclagan and Sir William Malcolm Hailey
3rd (3 January 1927 – 26 July 1930)	Sir Shahab-ud-Din Virk	4 January 1927	26 July 1930	Sir William Malcolm Hailey and Sir G. F. Montmorency
4th (24 October 1930 – 10 November 1936)	Sir Shahab-ud-Din Virk	25 October 1930	24 July 1936	Sir G. F. Montmorency and Sir Herbert William Emerson
4th (24 October 1930 – 10 November 1936)	Chhotu Ram	20 October 1936	10 November 1936	Sir G. F. Montmorency and Sir Herbert William Emerson

=== Punjab Legislative Assembly ===
Punjab Provincial Assembly (1937-1947)
Assembly	Tenure		Leader of the House	Premier	Party formed government	Note
Assembly	First sitting	Date of dissolution	Leader of the House	Premier	Party formed government	Note
1	5 April 1937	19 March 1945	Sikandar Hayat Khan		Unionist Party	Assembly tenure extended due to World War II
1	5 April 1937	19 March 1945	Malik Khizar Hayat Tiwana		Unionist Party	Assembly dissolved to conduct fresh and Impartial election
2	21 March 1946	4 July 1947	Malik Khizar Hayat Tiwana		Unionist Party	Assembly dissolved since government resigned against Partition
Punjab Legislative Assembly (1947–present)
Assembly	Tenure		Leader of the House	Chief Minister	Party formed government	Note
Assembly	First sitting	Date of dissolution	Leader of the House	Chief Minister	Party formed government	Note
Interim	1 November 1947	20 June 1951	Gopi Chand Bhargava		Indian National Congress	Interim Assembly
Interim	1 November 1947	20 June 1951	Bhim Sen Sachar		Indian National Congress	Interim Assembly
Interim	1 November 1947	20 June 1951	Gopi Chand Bhargava		Indian National Congress	Interim Assembly
1st	3 May 1952	31 March 1957	Bhim Sen Sachar		Indian National Congress	
1st	3 May 1952	31 March 1957	Partap Singh Kairon		Indian National Congress	
2nd	24 April 1957	1 March 1962	Partap Singh Kairon		Indian National Congress	
3rd	13 March 1962	28 February 1967	Partap Singh Kairon		Indian National Congress	Assembly under suspension from 5 July 1966 to 1 November 1966
3rd	13 March 1962	28 February 1967	Partap Singh Kairon	Gopi Chand Bhargava	Indian National Congress	Assembly under suspension from 5 July 1966 to 1 November 1966
3rd	13 March 1962	28 February 1967	Ram Kishan		Indian National Congress	Assembly under suspension from 5 July 1966 to 1 November 1966
3rd	13 March 1962	28 February 1967	Ram Kishan	Gurmukh Singh Musafir	Indian National Congress	Assembly under suspension from 5 July 1966 to 1 November 1966
4th	20 March 1967	23 August 1968	Gurnam Singh		Akali Dal - Sant Fateh Singh	Assembly dissolved prematurely
4th	20 March 1967	23 August 1968	Lachhman Singh Gill		Punjab Janta Party	Assembly dissolved prematurely
5th	13 March 1969	14 June 1971	Gurnam Singh		Shiromani Akali Dal	Assembly dissolved prematurely
5th	13 March 1969	14 June 1971	Parkash Singh Badal		Shiromani Akali Dal	Assembly dissolved prematurely
6th	21 March 1972	30 April 1977	Zail Singh		Indian National Congress	Assembly tenure extended by one month due to Emergency
7th	30 June 1977	17 February 1980	Parkash Singh Badal		Shiromani Akali Dal	Assembly dissolved prematurely
8th	23 June 1980	26 June 1985	Darbara Singh		Indian National Congress	Assembly suspended from 6 October 1983 and later dissolved due to Insurgency on 26 June 1985.
9th	14 October 1985	6 March 1988	Surjit Singh Barnala		Shiromani Akali Dal	Assembly suspended prematurely due to Insurgency on 11 June 1987 and later on dissolved on 6 March 1988.
10	16 March 1992	11 February 1997	Beant Singh		Indian National Congress	-
10	16 March 1992	11 February 1997	Harcharan Singh Brar		Indian National Congress	-
10	16 March 1992	11 February 1997	Rajinder Kaur Bhattal		Indian National Congress	-
11	3 March 1997	26 February 2002	Parkash Singh Badal		Shiromani Akali Dal	
12	21 March 2002	27 February 2007	Amarinder Singh		Indian National Congress	
13	1 March 2007	6 March 2012	Parkash Singh Badal		Shiromani Akali Dal	
14	19 March 2012	11 March 2017	Parkash Singh Badal		Shiromani Akali Dal	
15	24 March 2017	11 March 2022	Amarinder Singh		Indian National Congress	
15	24 March 2017	11 March 2022	Charanjit Singh Channi		Indian National Congress	
16	17 March 2022	Incumbent	Bhagwant Mann		Aam Aadmi Party	

== State under President's rule ==
Punjab Provincial Assembly (1937-1947)
Assembly	Governor's Rule	Tenure			Reason
1	Governor's Rule	19 March 1945	21 March 1946	1 year, 2 days	To conduct fresh and Impartial election
2	Governor's Rule	2 March 1947	15 August 1947	166 days	Government resigned against the decision of Partition of India
Punjab Legislative Assembly (1947–present)
Assembly	President's Rule	Tenure			Reason
Interim	President's rule	20 June 1951	17 April 1952	302 days	Assembly kept in suspension to help the state government get its act together and conduct fresh elections
3	President's rule	5 July 1966	1 November 1966	119 days	State administration was taken over, to facilitate bifurcation of Punjab state into, Punjab and Haryana
4	President's rule	23 August 1968	17 February 1969	178 days	Break-up of coalition
5	President's rule	14 June 1971	17 March 1972	277 days	Following the 1971 Lok Sabha Elections, incumbent Chief Minister advised dissolving state assembly and holding fresh elections
6	President's rule	30 April 1977	20 June 1977	51 days	To conduct the fresh election after Emergency in India
7	President's rule	17 February 1980	6 June 1980	110 days	Government dismissed in spite of Parkash Singh Badal enjoying majority support in Assembly
8	President's rule	6 October 1983	29 September 1985	1 year, 358 days	Insurgency and breakdown of law and order
9	President's rule	11 June 1987	25 February 1992	4 years, 259 days	Insurgency and breakdown of law and order

== See also ==
- PEPSU
- Interim East Punjab Assembly
- List of governors of Punjab (India)
- List of constituencies of Punjab Legislative Assembly
- List of deputy chief ministers of Punjab, India
- List of speakers of the Punjab Legislative Assembly
- List of leaders of the opposition in the Punjab Legislative Assembly
