= Punjab Pradesh Congress Committee =

Punjab Pradesh Congress Committee PPCC
- President: Pargat Singh
- Chairman: Partap Singh Bajwa
- General Secretary: Capt. Sandeep Singh Sandhu
- Headquarters: Sector-15A, Chandigarh-160015
- Youth wing: Punjab Youth Congress
- Women's wing: Punjab Pradesh Mahila Congress Committee
- Ideology: Social liberalism; Progressivism; Secularism; Democratic socialism; Indian nationalism; Composite nationalism
- Political position: Centre
- ECI status: A State Unit of Indian National Congress
- Alliance: Indian National Developmental Inclusive Alliance
- Seats in Rajya Sabha: 0 / 7
- Seats in Lok Sabha: 7 / 13
- Seats in Punjab Legislative Assembly: 15 / 117

Election symbol

Website
- www.ppcc.in

Punjab Pradesh Congress Committee (or PPCC), formerly known as the Punjab Provincial Congress Committee in colonial India, is the affiliate of the Indian National Congress in the state of Punjab. It is responsible for organizing and coordinating the party's activities and campaigns within the state, as well as selecting candidates for local, state, and national elections. On 9 April 2022, Amrinder Singh Raja Warring was appointed by the national leadership of Congress as the chief of Congress in Punjab. He is a 25th president to hold the post. Present general secretary in-charge of Punjab Pradesh Congress Committee is Sachin Pilot who was appointed in 2026.

== Office Bearers ==
Office bearers of the Punjab Pradesh Congress Committee
No.	Name	Designation
1	Pargat Singh	President
2	Bharat Bhushan Ashu	Working President
3	Inderbir Singh Bolria	Vice President
4	Kushaldeep Singh Kiki Dhillon	Vice President
5	Pargat Singh	Vice President
6	Sunder Sham Arora	Vice President
7	Sandeep Singh Sandhu	General Secretary

== List of chief ministers of Punjab from Indian National Congress ==
Chief ministers of Punjab from the Indian National Congress
No.	Chief minister	Portrait	Took office	Left office	Tenure	Assembly	Constituency	Remarks
1.	Gopi Chand Bhargava		15 August 1947	13 April 1949	3 years, 121 days	Interim Assembly	—	First Chief Minister of East Punjab after Indian independence.
1.	Gopi Chand Bhargava		18 October 1949	20 June 1951	3 years, 121 days	Interim Assembly	—	First Chief Minister of East Punjab after Indian independence.
2.	Bhim Sen Sachar		13 April 1949	18 October 1949	4 years, 104 days	Interim Assembly	—	Served multiple terms as Chief Minister.
2.	Bhim Sen Sachar		17 April 1952	22 July 1956	4 years, 104 days	1st Punjab Assembly	Ludhiana City South	Served multiple terms as Chief Minister.
3.	Partap Singh Kairon		23 January 1956	21 June 1964	8 years, 150 days	1st Punjab Assembly	Sujanpur	Known for major agricultural and industrial development programmes.
3.	Partap Singh Kairon		23 January 1956	21 June 1964	8 years, 150 days	2nd Punjab Assembly	Sujanpur	Known for major agricultural and industrial development programmes.
3.	Partap Singh Kairon		23 January 1956	21 June 1964	8 years, 150 days	3rd Punjab Assembly	Sujanpur	Known for major agricultural and industrial development programmes.
4.	Ram Kishan		7 July 1964	5 July 1966	1 year, 363 days	3rd Punjab Assembly	Jalandhar North East	Last Chief Minister of undivided Punjab before reorganisation.
5.	Giani Gurmukh Singh Musafir		1 November 1966	8 March 1967	127 days	3rd Punjab Assembly	MLC	First Chief Minister of the reorganised Punjab.
6.	Giani Zail Singh		17 March 1972	30 April 1977	5 years, 44 days	6th Punjab Assembly	Anandpur Sahib	Later became the seventh President of India.
7.	Darbara Singh		6 June 1980	6 October 1983	3 years, 122 days	8th Punjab Assembly	Nakodar	Led the state during a period of political unrest.
8.	Beant Singh		25 February 1992	31 August 1995	3 years, 187 days	10th Punjab Assembly	Jalandhar Cantonment	Assassinated while serving as Chief Minister.
9.	Harcharan Singh Brar		31 August 1995	21 November 1996	1 year, 82 days	10th Punjab Assembly	Muktsar	Succeeded Beant Singh.
10.	Rajinder Kaur Bhattal		21 November 1996	11 February 1997	82 days	10th Punjab Assembly	Lehra	First woman Chief Minister of Punjab.
11.	Amarinder Singh		26 February 2002	1 March 2007	9 years, 191 days	12th Assembly	Patiala Urban	First full-term Congress Chief Minister after 1992.
11.	Amarinder Singh		16 March 2017	20 September 2021	9 years, 191 days	15th Punjab Assembly	Patiala Urban	Returned to power after ten years; resigned in 2021.
12.	Charanjit Singh Channi		20 September 2021	16 March 2022	177 days	15th Punjab Assembly	Chamkaur Sahib	First Dalit Chief Minister of Punjab.

== List of deputy chief ministers of Punjab from Indian National Congress ==
List of deputy chief ministers of Punjab from the Indian National Congress
No.	Deputy Chief Minister	Portrait	Term start	Term end	Tenure	Chief Minister	Assembly	Constituency
1	Rajinder Kaur Bhattal		6 August 1996	21 November 1996	107 days	Harcharan Singh Brar	11th Punjab Assembly	Lehra
2	Rajinder Kaur Bhattal		6 January 2004	1 March 2007	3 years, 54 days	Amarinder Singh	12th Punjab Assembly	Lehra
3	Sukhjinder Singh Randhawa		20 September 2021	16 March 2022	177 days	Charanjit Singh Channi	15th Punjab Assembly	Dera Baba Nanak
4	Om Parkash Soni		20 September 2021	16 March 2022	177 days	Charanjit Singh Channi	15th Punjab Assembly	Amritsar Central

== Presidents of the Punjab Pradesh Congress Committee ==
No.	President	Took office	Left office	Remarks
1	Saifuddin Kitchlew	1921	1922	Prominent nationalist leader during the Non-Cooperation Movement.
2	Lala Dunichand	1922	1923	Senior Congress leader who strengthened the provincial organisation.
3	Gopi Chand Bhargava	1946	1947	Later became the first Chief Minister of East Punjab.
4	Partap Singh Kairon	1952	1955	Later served as Chief Minister of Punjab.
5	Darbara Singh	1957	1964	Later served as Chief Minister of Punjab.
6	Giani Zail Singh	1966	1969	Later became President of India.
7	Vishwa Mittar Sekhri	1969	1972	Led the organisation before the 1972 Assembly election.
8	Raghunandan Lal Bhatia	1982	1984	Later served as Governor of Kerala and Bihar.
9	Santokh Singh Randhawa	1984	1985	Led the party during a challenging political period.
10	Rajinder Singh Sparrow	1985	1986	Former Indian Army officer.
11	Rajinder Kaur Bhattal	1997	1999	Later became the first woman Chief Minister of Punjab.
12	Amarinder Singh	7 November 1999	15 November 2002	Led the Congress to victory in the 2002 Punjab Assembly election.
13	Harvendra Singh Hanspal	15 November 2002	20 July 2005	Focused on strengthening the party organisation.
14	Shamsher Singh Dullo	20 July 2005	14 February 2008	Led the party during the 2007 Assembly election.
15	Mohinder Singh Kaypee	14 February 2008	12 January 2010	Former minister and Member of Parliament.
16	Amarinder Singh	12 January 2010	3 December 2013	Returned as state president ahead of the 2012 Assembly election.
17	Pratap Singh Bajwa	3 December 2013	27 November 2015	Later became Leader of the Opposition.
18	Amarinder Singh	27 November 2015	8 May 2017	Led the Congress to victory in the 2017 Punjab Assembly election.
19	Sunil Jakhar	8 May 2017	18 July 2021	Oversaw the party organisation after the 2017 victory.
20	Navjot Singh Sidhu	23 July 2021	9 April 2022	Served during a period of internal organisational changes.
21	Amrinder Singh Raja Warring	9 April 2022	2 October 2026	Led the party during the 2024 Lok Sabha election.
22	Pargat Singh	2 October 2026	Incumbent	Current president of the Punjab Pradesh Congress Committee.

== Prominent members ==
Prominent Members of PPCC
Leader	Office held/current	Ref
Partap Singh Bajwa	Incumbent Leader of Opposition in Punjab Assembly.; Former President Punjab PCC; (2013–2015); Former Lok Sabha MP from Gurdaspur; Former Rajya Sabha MP; MLA from Qadian Assembly constituency.	
Amrinder Singh Raja Warring	MP Lok Sabha from Ludhiana Lok Sabha constituency.; Former President Punjab PCC; (2022-2026); Former minister of transport.; Former MLA from Gidderbaha Assembly constituency.	
Charanjit Singh Channi	MP Lok Sabha from Jalandhar Lok Sabha constituency.; Former chief minister (2021-2022); Former MLA from Chamkaur Sahib Assembly constituency.	
Navjot Singh Sidhu	Former Punjab PCC President; Former MLA from Amritsar East Assembly constituency.	
Sukhjinder Singh Randhawa	Former Deputy Chief Minister; Lok Sabha MP from Gurdaspur Lok Sabha constituency; Former MLA from Dera Baba Nanak Assembly constituency.; General Secretary of AICC for Rajasthan.	

== Electoral performance ==
=== Legislative Assembly Election ===
Year	Assembly Election	Votes Polled	Vote Percent	Seats Won	Seat Change	Outcome
1952	1st Assembly	1,830,601	36.69%	96 / 126	▲96	Government
1957	2nd Assembly	3,612,709	47.51%	120 / 154	▲24	Government
1962	3rd Assembly	2,946,209	43.72%	90 / 154	▼30	Government
Punjab (1967-present)
1967	4th Assembly	1,594,160	37.45%	48 / 104	▼42	Opposition
1969	5th Assembly	1,844,360	39.18%	38 / 104	▼10	Opposition
1972	6th Assembly	2,083,390	42.84%	66 / 104	▲28	Government
1977	7th Assembly	1,899,534	33.59%	17 / 117	▼49	Opposition
1980	8th Assembly	2,825,827	45.19%	63 / 117	▲46	Government
1985	9th Assembly	2,620,042	37.86%	32 / 117	▼31	Opposition
1992	10th Assembly	1,317,075	43.83%	87 / 117	▲55	Government
1997	11th Assembly	2,736,346	26.38%	14 / 117	▼73	Opposition
2002	12th Assembly	3,682,877	40.11%	62 / 117	▲48	Government
2007	13h Assembly	5,170,548	40.90%	44 / 117	▼18	Opposition
2012	14th Assembly	5,572,643	40.11% (▼0.79%)	46 / 117	▲2	Opposition
2017	15th Assembly	5,945,899	38.64% (▼1.46%)	77 / 117	▲31	Government
2022	16th Assembly	3,576,684	22.98% (▼15.66%)	18 / 117	▼59	Opposition

=== Lok Sabha Elections ===
Lok Sabha Elections
Year	Lok Sabha	Seats contested	Seats won	(+/-) in seats	% of votes	Vote swing	Popular vote	Outcome
1951	1st	18	16 / 18	New entry	42.76%	New entry	21,34,586	Government
1957	2nd	22	21 / 22	▲5	51.26%	▲8.50	36,82,219	Government
1962	3rd	22	14 / 22	▼7	41.30%	▼9.96	28,02,692	Government
1967	4th	13	9 / 13	▼5	37.31%	▼3.99	15,98,546	Government
1971	5th	11	10 / 13	▲1	45.96%	▲8.65	18,73,862	Government
1977	6th	13	0 / 13	▼10	34.85%	▼11.11	19,55,485	Opposition
1980	7th	13	12 / 13	▲12	52.45%	▲17.60	31,33,473	Government
1985	8th	13	6 / 13	▼6	41.53%	▼10.92	28,79,089	Government
1989	9th	13	2 / 13	▼4	26.49%	▼15.04	21,03,712	Opposition
1992	10th	13	12 / 13	▲10	49.27%	▲22.78	14,86,289	Government
1996	11th	13	2 / 13	▼10	35.10%	▼14.17	30,98,956	Opposition
1998	12th	8	0 / 13	▼2	25.85%	▼9.25	23,56,281	Opposition
1999	13th	11	8 / 13	▲8	38.44%	▲12.59	33,65,176	Opposition
2004	14th	11	2 / 13	▼6	34.17%	▼4.27	34,95,187	Government
2009	15th	13	8 / 13	▲6	45.23%	▲11.06	53,50,377	Government
2014	16th	13	3 / 13	▼5	33.05%	▼12.18	45,75,879	Opposition
2019	17th	13	8 / 13	▲5	40.12%	▲7.07	55,23,066	Opposition
2024	18th	13	7 / 13	▼1	26.30%	▼13.82	35,43,824	Opposition

== Local Elections ==
Punjab Municipal Corporation elections (2018–2026)
Year	Municipal Corporation	Composition	Seats won	Change	Status
2018	Amritsar	61 / 85	61 / 85	▲	Majority
2018	Jalandhar	66 / 80	66 / 80	▲	Majority
2018	Ludhiana	62 / 95	62 / 95	▲	Majority
2018	Patiala	43 / 60	43 / 60	▲	Majority
2018	Bathinda	0 / 50	0 / 50	—	Opposition
2021	Abohar	49 / 50	49 / 50	▲	Majority
2021	Batala	36 / 50	36 / 50	▲	Majority
2021	Bathinda	43 / 50	43 / 50	▲	Majority
2021	Hoshiarpur	41 / 50	41 / 50	▲	Majority
2021	Kapurthala	45 / 50	45 / 50	▲	Majority
2021	Mohali	37 / 50	37 / 50	▲	Majority
2021	Moga	29 / 50	29 / 50	▲	Majority
2021	Pathankot	37 / 50	37 / 50	▲	Majority
2026	Abohar	1 / 50	1 / 50	▼ −48	Opposition
2026	Barnala	2 / 50	2 / 50	—	Opposition
2026	Batala	18 / 50	18 / 50	▼ −23	Opposition
2026	Bathinda	3 / 50	3 / 50	▼ −40	Opposition
2026	Kapurthala	31 / 50	31 / 50	▼ −14	Majority
2026	Moga	5 / 50	5 / 50	▼ −24	Opposition
2026	Mohali	6 / 50	6 / 50	▼ −31	Opposition
2026	Pathankot	13 / 50	13 / 50	▼ −24	Opposition

=== Pre-Independence ===
Punjab Legislative Council

Year				Others	Total
Year	UoP	INC	IND	Others	Total
1920	-	-	71	-	71
1923	33	0	17	21	71
1926	31	2	12	26	71
1930	37	0	14	20	71

Punjab Legislative Assembly

Year						Others	Total
Year	UoP	INC	SAD	AIML	IND	Others	Total
1937	98	18	11	2	16	30	175
1946	19	51	21	73	11	0	175

=== Post-Independence ===
Years						Others	Total
Years	INC	SAD	AAP	BJP	IND	Others	Total
1952	96	13	~	~	9	8	126
1957	120	^	~	~	13	21	154
1962	90	19	~	~	18	27	154
1967	48	^	~	~	9	47	104
1969	38	43	~	~	4	17	104
1972	66	24	~	~	3	11	104
1977	17	58	~	~	2	40	117
1980	63	37	~	1	2	14	117
1985	32	73	~	6	4	2	117
1992	87	3	~	6	4	20	117
1997	14	75	~	18	6	4	117
2002	62	41	~	3	9	2	117
2007	44	49	~	19	5	0	117
2012	46	56	~	12	3	0	117
2017	77	15	20	3	0	2	117
2022	18	3	92	2	0	1	117

- ^ - Party didn't contest election
- ~ - Party didn't exist
- - Green color box indicates the party/parties who formed the government
- - Red color box indicates the official opposition party

== See also ==
- All India Congress Committee
- Pradesh Congress Committee
