= List of leaders of the opposition in the Punjab Legislative Assembly =

Punjab's opposition leader

Leader of the Opposition in the Punjab Legislative Assembly
- Emblem of Punjab

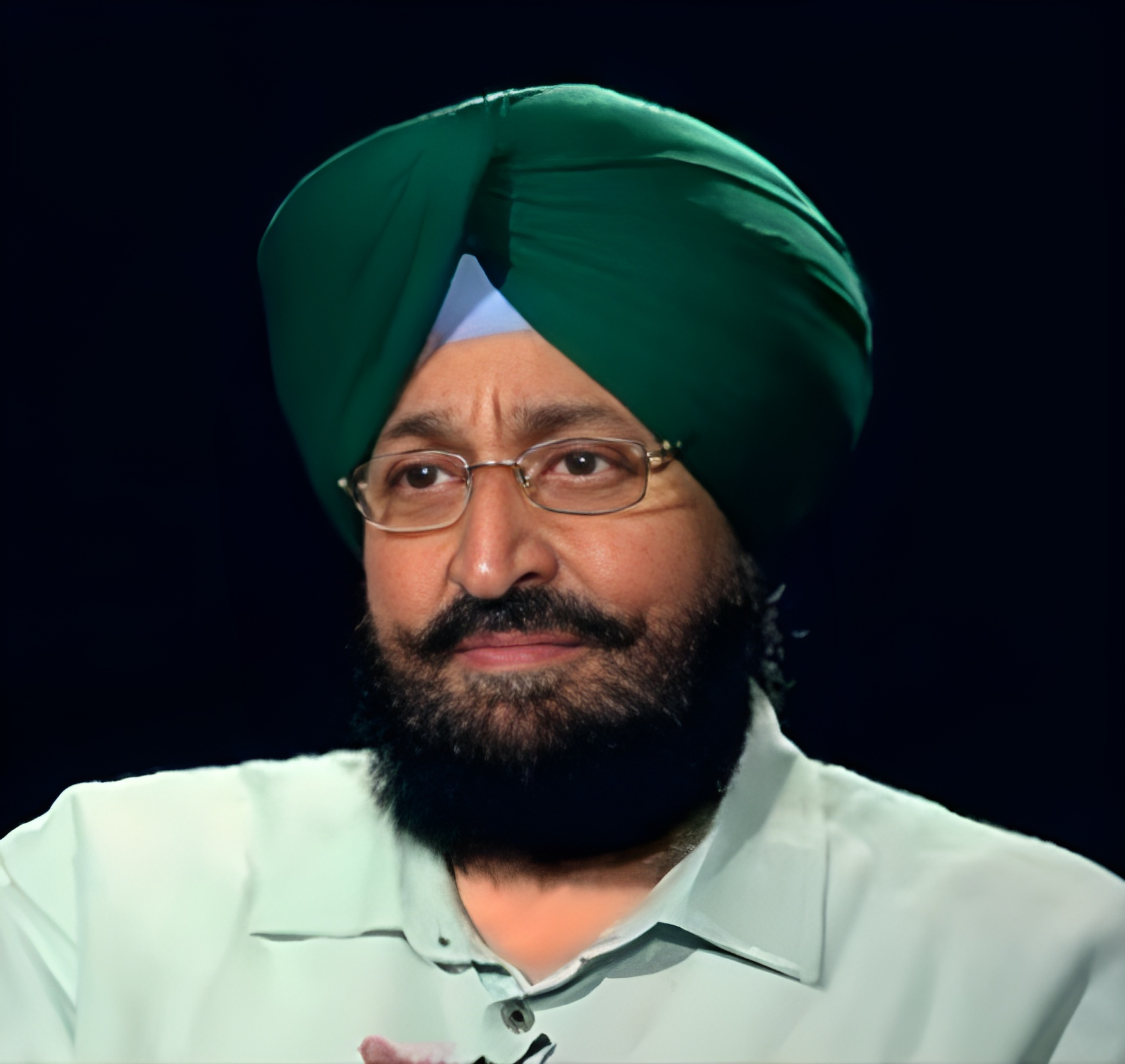
- Incumbent; Partap Singh Bajwa since 9 April 2022
- Member of: Punjab Legislative Assembly; Official Opposition
- Nominator: Members of Official Opposition
- Appointer: Speaker of Punjab assembly
- Term length: Five years, No restriction on renewal
- Inaugural holder: Gopi Chand Bhargava
- Formation: 6 April 1937; 89 years, 192 days ago
- Deputy: Aruna Chaudhary (since 3 September 2024)

The leader of the opposition in the Punjab Legislative Assembly is the politician who leads the official opposition in the Punjab Legislative Assembly. The leader of the opposition is a title traditionally held by the leader of the largest political party not in government, typical in countries utilizing the parliamentary system form of government. The leader of the opposition is typically seen as an alternative prime minister, premier, first minister, or chief minister to the incumbent; in the Westminster system, they head a rival alternative government known as the shadow cabinet or opposition front bench. The same term is also used to refer to the leader of the largest political party that is not in government in subnational state, provincial, and other regional and local legislatures. The incumbent leader of the opposition in the Punjab assembly is Partap Singh Bajwa of Indian National Congress, while Aruna Chaudhary is his deputy.

== Official Opposition ==
Official Opposition is a term used in Punjab Legislative Assembly to designate the political party which has secured the second largest number of seats Punjab assembly. In order to get formal recognition, the party must have at least 10% of total membership of the Legislative Assembly. A single party has to meet the 10% seat criterion, not an alliance. Many of the Indian state legislatures also follows this 10% rule while the rest of them prefer single largest opposition party according to the rules of their respective houses. Punjab Legislative Assembly appointed the member of the second largest party as Leader of opposition.

== Role ==
The Opposition's main role is to question the government of the day and hold them accountable to the public. The Opposition is equally responsible in upholding the best interests of the people of the country. They have to ensure that the Government does not take any steps, which might have negative effects on the people of the country.

The role of the opposition in legislature is basically to check the excesses of the ruling or dominant party, and not to be totally antagonistic. There are actions of the ruling party which may be beneficial to the masses and opposition is expected to support such steps.

In legislature, Opposition Party has a major role and must act to discourage the party in power from acting against the interests of the country and the common man. They are expected to alert the population and the Government on the content of any Bill, which is not in the best interests of the country.

== History ==
=== After Independence ===
Till now, 18 people served as leaders of the opposition in the Punjab assembly. Gopal Singh Khalsa was the first leader of the opposition in the first Punjab assembly as in the Interim assembly, there was no opposition as all non-Congress members who were elected in the 1946 election joined Congress after the partition. He was also the first Dalit who became the leader of the opposition. The other Dalit leaders of the opposition in Punjab were Jagjit Singh, Satnam Singh Kainth and Charanjit Singh Channi. Out of 18, Prakash Singh Badal and Gurnam Singh served thrice, while Rajinder Kaur Bhattal served twice, and all others served only once. Gurbinder Kaur Brar was the first female leader of the opposition in the Punjab assembly, and the other was Rajinder Kaur Bhattal. Prakash Singh Badal was the longest-serving leader of the opposition, while Harvinder Singh Phoolka served the shortest. Balram Jakhar and Sunil Kumar Jakhar was the father-son duo served the post.

Gurnam Singh, Parkash Singh Badal, Rajinder Kaur Bhattal and Charanjit Singh Channi also served as the Leader of the House.

There were a total of 11 occasions when the post remained vacant. Out of these, 3 occasions were when opposition was not present in the assembly, while other 8 occasions were when assembly was either under suspension or dissolved due to various reasons. In former case, 2 out of 3 times, opposition members actually joined the government under some agreements and in the remaining 1 case, opposition resingned from the assembly because of Supreme Court of India's decision on Sutlej Yamuna link canal issue.

== Color keys ==
Color keys for the party of leaders of the opposition

- Aam Aadmi Party
- Akali Dal - Sant Fateh Singh Group
- All-India Muslim League
- Bahujan Samaj Party
- Bharatiya Jana Sangh
- Indian National Congress
- Shiromani Akali Dal

Other keys

- Vancacy due to dissolution of assembly
- Vancacy due to absence of opposition in assembly
- Vancacy due to suspension of assembly

== List of leaders of the opposition ==
=== Before independence (1937–1947) ===
S.No.	Portrait	Name (birth-death) (Constituency)	Tenure		Party	Election	Government	
S.No.	Portrait	Name (birth-death) (Constituency)	Took office	Left office	Party	Election	Premier	Party
1		Gopi Chand Bhargava (1899–1966) (Lahore City)	5 April 1937	1940	Indian National Congress	1937	Sikandar Hayat Khan (1937–1942) Malik Khizar Hayat Tiwana (1942–1945)	Unionist Party
2		Sardar Sampuran Singh (1889-1951) (Lyallpur West-Sikh-Rural)	1940	1942	Shiromani Akali Dal	1937	Sikandar Hayat Khan (1937–1942) Malik Khizar Hayat Tiwana (1942–1945)	Unionist Party
3		Bhim Sen Sachar (1894–1978) (N-W Town)	1942	5 February 1945	Indian National Congress	1937	Sikandar Hayat Khan (1937–1942) Malik Khizar Hayat Tiwana (1942–1945)	Unionist Party
–	Vacant (Assembly under dissolution)		5 February 1945	21 March 1946	-			
4		Iftikhar Hussain Khan (1906–1969) (Ferozpur General)	21 March 1946	2 March 1947	All-India Muslim League	1946	Malik Khizar Hayat Tiwana	Unionist Party
–	Vacant (Assembly under dissolution)		2 March 1947	15 August 1947	-			

=== After independence (since 1947) ===
S.No.	Portrait	Name (birth-death) (Constituency)	Tenure			Party	Election (Assembly)	Government	
S.No.	Portrait	Name (birth-death) (Constituency)	Took office	Left office	Duration	Party	Election (Assembly)	Chief Minister	Party
–	Vacant (No official opposition)		15 August 1947	20 June 1951	3 years, 309 days	–	1946 (Interim)	Gopi Chand Bhargava (1947–1949) (1949–1951) Bhim Sen Sachar (Ap. 1949-Oct. 1949)	Indian National Congress
–	Vacant (Note: President's rule may be imposed when the "government in a state is not able to function as per the Constitution", which often happens because no party or coalition has a majority in the assembly. When President's rule is in force in a state, its council of ministers stands dissolved. The office of chief minister thus lies vacant, and the administration is taken over by the governor, who functions on behalf of the central government. At times, the legislative assembly also stands dissolved.) (President's rule) (Assembly under dissolution)		20 June 1951	17 April 1952	302 days	-			
1		Gopal Singh Khalsa (1903–1979) (Jagraon)	17 April 1952	11 April 1956	3 years, 360 days	Shiromani Akali Dal	1952 (First)	Bhim Sen Sachar (1952–1956) Partap Singh Kairon (1956–1964)	Indian National Congress
–	Vacant (Note: All opposition members joined the Government.) (No official opposition)		11 April 1956	9 April 1957	363 days	–	1952 (First)	Bhim Sen Sachar (1952–1956) Partap Singh Kairon (1956–1964)	Indian National Congress
2		Baldev Prakash (1922–1992) (Amritsar City; East)	9 April 1957	11 March 1962	4 years, 336 days	Bharatiya Jana Sangh	1957 (Second)	Partap Singh Kairon	Indian National Congress
3		Gurnam Singh (1899–1973) (Raikot)	11 March 1962	5 July 1966	4 years, 116 days	Shiromani Akali Dal	1962 (Third)	Partap Singh Kairon (1956–1964) Gopi Chand Bhargava (1964) Ram Kishan (1964–1966)	Indian National Congress
–	Vacant (President's rule) (Assembly under suspension)		5 July 1966	1 November 1966	119 days	–	1962 (Third)	–	
(3)		Gurnam Singh (1899–1973) (Raikot)	1 November 1966	8 March 1967	127 days	Shiromani Akali Dal	1962 (Third)	Giani Gurmukh Singh Musafir	Indian National Congress
4		Gian Singh Rarewala (1901–1979) (Payal)	9 March 1967	24 November 1967	260 days	Indian National Congress	1967 (Fourth)	Gurnam Singh	Akali Dal – Sant Fateh Singh Group
(3)		Gurnam Singh (1899–1973) (Qila Raipur)	24 November 1967	23 August 1968	273 days	Akali Dal – Sant Fateh Singh Group	1967 (Fourth)	Lachhman Singh	Punjab Janata Party
–	Vacant (President's rule) (Assembly under dissolution)		23 August 1968	17 February 1969	178 days	–			
5		Harinder Singh (1917–1972) (Ajnala)	17 February 1969	14 June 1971	2 years, 117 days	Indian National Congress	1969 (Fifth)	Gurnam Singh (1969–1970) Parkash Singh Badal (1970–1971)	Shiromani Akali Dal
–	Vacant (President's rule) (Assembly under dissolution)		14 June 1971	16 March 1972	276 days	–			
6		Jaswinder Singh Brar (1938–1993) (Kotkapura)	16 March 1972	2 October 1972	200 days	Shiromani Akali Dal	1972 (Sixth)	Zail Singh	Indian National Congress
7		Parkash Singh Badal (1927–2023) (Gidderbaha)	2 October 1972	30 April 1977	4 years, 210 days	Shiromani Akali Dal	1972 (Sixth)	Zail Singh	Indian National Congress
–	Vacant (President's rule) (Assembly under dissolution)		30 April 1977	19 June 1977	50 days	–			
8		Balram Jakhar (1923–2016) (Abohar)	19 June 1977	17 February 1980	2 years, 243 days	Indian National Congress	1977 (Seventh)	Parkash Singh Badal	Shiromani Akali Dal
–	Vacant (President's rule) (Assembly under dissolution)		17 February 1980	7 June 1980	111 days	–			
(7)		Parkash Singh Badal (1927–2023) (Gidderbaha)	7 June 1980	7 October 1983	3 years, 122 days	Shiromani Akali Dal	1980 (Eighth)	Darbara Singh	Indian National Congress
–	Vacant (President's rule) (Assembly under dissolution)		7 October 1983	29 September 1985	1 year, 357 days	–			
9		Gurbinder Kaur Brar (1922–2013) (Muktsar)	29 September 1985	11 May 1987	1 year, 224 days	Indian National Congress	1985 (Ninth)	Surjit Singh Barnala	Shiromani Akali Dal
–	Vacant (President's rule) (Assembly under dissolution)		11 May 1987	25 February 1992	4 years, 290 days	–			
10		Satnam Singh Kainth (1961–2018) (Phillaur)	25 February 1992	12 February 1997	4 years, 353 days	Bahujan Samaj Party	1992 (Tenth)	Beant Singh (1992–1995) Harcharan Singh Brar (1995–1996) Rajinder Kaur Bhattal (1996–1997)	Indian National Congress
11		Rajinder Kaur Bhattal (b. 1945) (Lehra)	12 February 1997	10 October 1998	1 year, 240 days	Indian National Congress	1997 (Eleventh)	Parkash Singh Badal	Shiromani Akali Dal
12		Jagjit Singh (1934–2015) (Kartarpur)	10 October 1998	26 February 2002	3 years, 139 days	Indian National Congress	1997 (Eleventh)	Parkash Singh Badal	Shiromani Akali Dal
(7)		Parkash Singh Badal (1927–2023) (Lambi)	26 February 2002	1 March 2007	5 years, 3 days	Shiromani Akali Dal	2002 (Twelfth)	Amarinder Singh	Indian National Congress
(11)		Rajinder Kaur Bhattal (b. 1945) (Lehra)	1 March 2007	14 March 2012	5 years, 13 days	Indian National Congress	2007 (Thirteen)	Parkash Singh Badal	Shiromani Akali Dal
13		Sunil Kumar Jakhar (b. 1954) (Abohar)	19 March 2012	11 December 2015	3 years, 267 days	Indian National Congress	2012 (Fourteen)	Parkash Singh Badal	Shiromani Akali Dal
14		Charanjit Singh Channi (b. 1963) (Chamkaur Sahib)	11 December 2015	11 November 2016	336 days	Indian National Congress	2012 (Fourteen)	Parkash Singh Badal	Shiromani Akali Dal
–	Vacant (Note: All opposition members resigned against SYL canal issue.) (No official opposition)		11 November 2016	16 March 2017	125 days	–	2012 (Fourteen)	Parkash Singh Badal	Shiromani Akali Dal
15		Harvinder Singh Phoolka (b. 1955) (Dakha)	16 March 2017	20 July 2017	126 days	Aam Admi Party	2017 (Fifteen)	Amarinder Singh	Indian National Congress
16		Sukhpal Singh Khaira (b. 1965) (Bolath)	20 July 2017	26 July 2018	1 year, 6 days	Aam Admi Party	2017 (Fifteen)	Amarinder Singh	Indian National Congress
17		Harpal Singh Cheema (b. 1974) (Dirba)	27 July 2018	16 March 2022	3 years, 232 days	Aam Admi Party	2017 (Fifteen)	Amarinder Singh (2017–2021) Charanjit Singh Channi (2021–2022)	Indian National Congress
18		Pratap Singh Bajwa (b. 1957) (Quadian)	9 April 2022	Incumbent	4 years, 189 days	Indian National Congress	2022 (Sixteen)	Bhagwant Mann	Aam Admi Party

== Statistics ==
=== List of leader of the opposition by their tenure ===
#	Chief Minister	Total terms	Party	Term of office	
#	Chief Minister	Total terms	Party	Longest continuous term	Total duration of leadership
1	Parkash Singh Badal	3	SAD	5 years, 3 days	12 years, 335 days
2	Rajinder Kaur Bhattal	2	INC	5 years, 13 days	6 years, 253 days
3	Gurnam Singh	3	SAD/ADSFG	4 years, 116 days	5 years, 148 days
4	Satnam Singh Kainth	1	BSP	4 years, 353 days	4 years, 353 days
5	Baldev Prakash	1	ABJS	4 years, 336 days	4 years, 336 days
6	Pratap Singh Bajwa*	1*	INC	4 years, 189 days*	4 years, 189 days*
7	Gopal Singh Khalsa	1	SAD	3 years, 360 days	3 years, 360 days
8	Sunil Kumar Jakhar	1	INC	3 years, 267 days	3 years, 267 days
9	Harpal Singh Cheema	1	AAP	3 years, 232 days	3 years, 232 days
10	Jagjit Singh	1	INC	3 years, 139 days	3 years, 139 days
11	Balram Jakhar	1	INC	2 years, 243 days	2 years, 243 days
12	Harinder Singh	1	INC	2 years, 117 days	2 years, 117 days
13	Gurbinder Kaur Brar	1	INC	1 year, 224 days	1 year, 224 days
14	Sukhpal Singh Khaira	1	AAP	1 year, 6 days	1 year, 6 days
15	Charanjit Singh Channi	1	INC	336 days	336 days
16	Gian Singh Rarewala	1	INC	260 days	260 days
17	Jaswinder Singh Brar	1	SAD	200 days	200 days
18	Harvinder Singh Phoolka	1	AAP	126 days	126 days
–	Vacant (No official opposition)	3	–	3 years, 309 days	5 years, 67 days
–	President rule	8	–	4 years, 259 days	9 years, 223 days

== Deputy leader of the opposition ==
Name (constituency)	Tenure		Party	Leader of Opposition	Assembly
Devi Lal (Fatehabad)	11 March 1962	5 July 1966	Independent	Gurnam Singh	3rd
Devi Lal (Fatehabad)	1 November 1966	8 March 1967	Independent	Gurnam Singh	3rd
Rattan Singh (Garshankar)	9 March 1967	24 November 1967	Indian National Congress	Gian Singh Rarewala	4th
Sardari Lal Kapoor (Ludhiana North)	17 February 1969	1970	Indian National Congress	Major Harinder Singh	5th
Surjit Singh Atwal (Phillaur)	1970	14 June 1971	Indian National Congress	Major Harinder Singh	5th
Umrao Singh (Nakodar)	19 June 1977	17 February 1980	Indian National Congress	Balram Jakhar	7th
Nirmal Singh Nimma (Bhadaur)	25 February 1992	12 February 1997	Bahujan Samaj Party	Satnam Singh Kainth	10th
Bharat Bhushan Ashu (Ludhiana West)	11 December 2015	11 November 2016	Indian National Congress	Charanjit Singh Channi	14th
Sarvjit Kaur Manuke (Jagraon)	16 March 2017	16 March 2022	Aam Admi Party	Harvinder Singh Phoolka, Sukhpal Singh Khaira, Harpal Singh Cheema	15th
Raj Kumar Chabbewal (Chabbewal)	9 April 2022	15 March 2024	Indian National Congress	Partap Singh Bajwa	16th
Aruna Chaudhary (Dinanagar)	3 September 2024	Incumbent	Indian National Congress	Partap Singh Bajwa	16th

== See also ==
- List of current Indian opposition leaders
- List of female leader of the opposition in India
