= 5th Punjab Assembly =

Law governing body of Punjab

Fifth Punjab Legislative Assembly
- Punjab Legislative Assembly

Type
- Type: Unicameral

History
- Founded: 13 March 1969
- Disbanded: 14 June 1971
- Preceded by: Fourth Punjab Legislative Assembly
- Succeeded by: Sixth Punjab Legislative Assembly

Leadership
- Speaker: Darbara Singh
- Deputy Speaker: Bikramjit Singh Bajwa
- Leader of House (Chief Minister): Gurnam Singh (1969-1970)
- Parkash Singh Badal (1970-1971)
- Leader of the Opposition: Harinder Singh

Structure
- Seats: 104
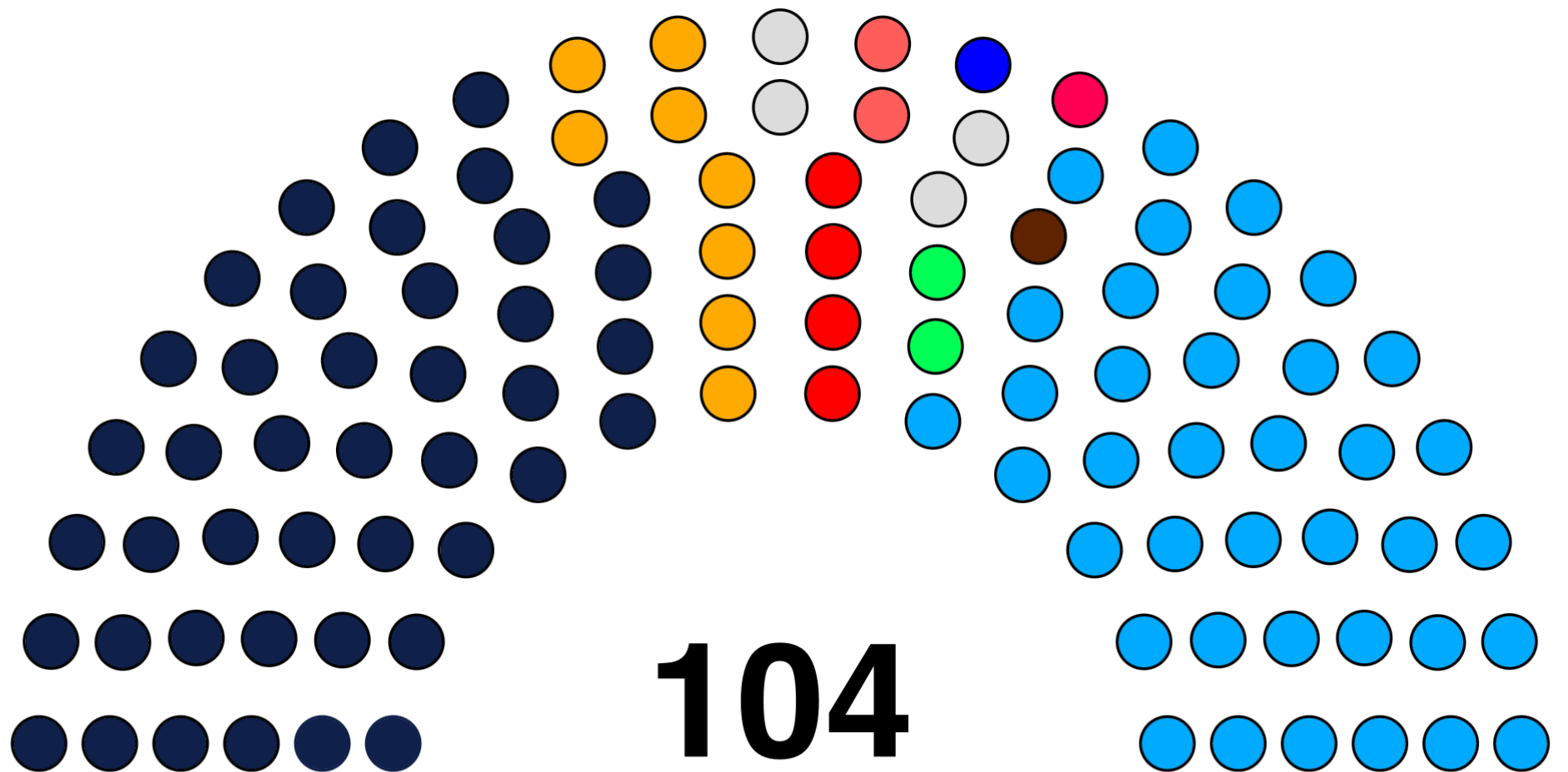
- Political groups: Government (59) (Note: The given members of parties were at the time of the formation of the Government. The numbers changed later on due to defections, resignations, mergers or splits.): UF (53); SAD (43); BJS (8); IND (2); Confidence and supply (6); CPI (4); CPIM (2); Opposition (45): INC (38); SSP (2); PJP (1); PSP (1); SwP (1); IND (2)
- Length of term: 1969-1971

Elections
- Voting system: first-past-the-post
- Last election: 1969
- Next election: 1972

The 1969 Punjab Legislative Assembly election was the fifth Vidhan Sabha (Legislative Assembly) election of the state. This was the second hung assembly. Shiromani Akali Dal emerged as the largest party with 43 seats in the 104-seat legislature in the election. The Indian National Congress became the second, holding 38 seats. On 13 June 1971, Assembly dissolved prematurely and president rule was imposed. (Note: President's rule may be imposed when the "government in a state is not able to function as per the Constitution", which often happens because no party or coalition has a majority in the assembly. When President's rule is in force in a state, its council of ministers stands dissolved. The office of chief minister thus lies vacant, and the administration is taken over by the governor, who functions on behalf of the central government. At times, the legislative assembly also stands dissolved.)

== Background ==
A mid-term poll in 1969 was necessary due to political parties' failure to form a stable government after the 1967 election. Again, no party got an absolutely majority. With 43 seats, Akali Dal emerged as the single largest party. Prior to the election both, Akali Dal – Sant Fateh Singh Group and Akali Dal - Master Tara Singh Group merged and re-established Shiromani Akali Dal.

On the other hand, Congress Party was a divided house. On 14 December 1968, it received a further set back when Gian Singh Rarewala defected to Akali Dal.

== First Akali-Jan Sangh government ==
Akali Dal formed an alliance with Bharatiya Jana Sangh and 2 Independents who won with the support of Akali Dal. Left Parties, i.e. Communist Party of India and Communist Party of India (Marxist) extended outside support to Akali-Jan Sangh government. Gurnam Singh became the Chief Minister Second time.

The Chief Minister preferred to call the Coalition Government a 'United Front' Government possibly to keep up the facade of Akali led People's United Front Government (1967). Gurnam Singh formed his ministry with four other members. 2 from Akali Dal (Atma Singh and Sohan Singh) and 2 from Jan Sangh (Balram Das Tandon and Krishan Lal).

=== Upheavals ===
With the installation of the Coalition Ministry in power, there started a tussle between Gurnam Singh and Sant Chanan Singh (President of SGPC) over the issue of abolition of Punjab Legislative Council. Gurnam Singh publicly declared that the government would bring an official resolution during the budget session in May 1969. Sant Chanan Singh opposed the move because his close associates were the members of the council. Furthermore, Sant wanted Gurnam Singh to include in his ministry a large number of his own men. The CM failure to comply with Sant's order irked the Sant. Gurnam Singh's biggest drawback was that he lacked any hold over the organisation.

In March 1969, about a month after assuming power, the rift between Coalition partners emerged. Differences between Akali Dal and Jan Sangh arose over three vital issues, namely:-

- Language,
- Center-State relations and
- Status of Chandigarh.

Akali wanted only Punjabi to the medium of instruction with Hindi as second language, whereas, Jan Sangh wanted Hindi as "mother tongue" of the sizable Hindu minority in Punjab.

Akali was in favour of greater autonomy for the States to secure a real "federal system". However, Jan Sangh opposed this idea.

Akali Dal demanded merger of Chandigarh and other Punjabi Speaking areas in Punjab soon. While, Jan Sangh advocate the appointment of a judicial tribunal to resolve the dispute.

By the mid of April 1969, the strength of Akali Dal rose to 48 by inducting four defector from Congress Party and one Independent and this created rift between Coalition partners as Jan Sangh didn't like to lose its identity and become an appendage of the Akali Dal. In June 1969, one more Congress legislator defected and joined Akali Dal.

=== No-confidence motion ===
In April 1969, Captain Rattan Singh (Deputy Leader of Opposition) moved a No-confidence motion against Gurnam Singh government on the ground of deteriorating situation of Law and Order in State. Leave for the motion was granted on 25 April 1969. In all, 13 legislators took part in the debate. When Speaker moved the motion for voting, the motion was negatived by voice vote.

== Coup against Gurnam Singh ==
Background

The month of March brought Gurnam Singh's downfall. In March 1970, during Rajya Sabha election, Sant Fateh Singh and Sant Chanan Singh selected Jathedar Santokh Singh as one of the two candidates while, rebel Akali leader Giani Bhupinder Singh also filed his nomination. Chief Minister Gurnam Singh backed the Giani. As Gurnam Singh had become unpliable, the two Sants had worked out a strategy at Amritsar to replace him.

Execution of Plan

On 25 March 1970, Jathedar Santokh Singh lost the election from Giani Bhupinder Singh and this irked the Sant Fateh Singh and he gave the green signal to Balwant Singh (Finance Minister) to start the toppling operation by refusing to move the Appropriation Bill in the State Assembly.

As the Strategy had already been worked out with the collaboration of the Jan Sangh Chief, Baldev Prakash, the Jan Sangh didn't come to Gurnam Singh's rescue. Sant Fateh Singh had already sounded a section of the Congressmen to remain neutral in the event of the toppling operation and the Sant was assured of it.

On the same day when Speaker called Finance Minister to move Appropriation Bill, he refused to do so. He suddenly announced in the State Assembly, that he would not move the Appropriation Bill. He forgot his constitutional obligations. If he didn't want to carry out his duties, he ought to have resigned. But he did nothing of the kind. By the time, Chief Minister was aware of the manoeuvre, it was too late and the House refused him the permission to move the Appropriation Bill. On this, Gurnam Singh himself moved the bill. This was, however, opposed and voting followed:-

- 22 - Favour [14-Akali (Gurnam faction), 3-Independents, 2-SSP, 1-PSP, 1-SwP, 1-Congress]
- 44 - Against [35-Akali (Sant faction), 7-Jan Sangh and 2-CPIM]
- 32 - Absent [28-Congress and 4-CPI]

Resignation

On the same day, Governor of Punjab, D. C. Pavate asked Gurnam Singh to resign as he had suffered a defeat on the Finance Bill. Gurnam Singh bluntly told the Governor that he had no intention to resign. Governor reminded him that with his defeat on the Finance Bill, he had practically ceased to be Chief Minister, and that with his resignation his colleagues would automatically cease to be ministers. On 25 March Governor again sent him a letter asking him to resign at once. His Secretary was authorised to inform him orally that the Governor would be required to dismiss him if his resignation didn't not reach him by the next morning.

On next day (26 March), Gurnam Singh submitted his resignation to Governor and Governor accepted his resignation immediately but asked him to continue till an alternative arrangements was made.

== Second Akali-Jan Sangh government ==
=== Government formation ===
The Political crisis which had resulted in the defeat of the Gurnam Singh Ministry ended on 27 March, when Governor once again exercised his option of choosing a candidate for the Chief Ministership from among the two contenders - Gurnam Singh and Prakash Singh Badal. Gurnam Singh claimed the support of 28 Congress MLAs. However, Badal, paraded his 54 supporters to Raj Bhavan. Firstly, Governor refused to meet him as he hated counting heads in such circumstances. Later on, he agreed and was convinced that Akali Party with Badal as its leader had the support of a majority in the House. On the same day, Parkash Singh Badal took the oath of the Chief Minister of Punjab along with two of his Cabinet colleagues - Balwant Singh (Akali Dal) and Balram Das Tandon (Jan Sangh).

Prakash Singh Badal raised the strength of his Council of Ministers to 9 (15 April) and later on 26 (5 and 6 June). The 7 member Jan Sangh had 3 Cabinet Ministers and 1 Minister of State. A large number of Akali MLAs were furious to not being provides with Ministerial berth or being accommodated in some other profitable manner.

=== Upheavals ===
Some Akali Ministers had openly levelled charges of corruption, favouritism and nepotism against the Industries Minister, Balram Das Tandon.

On 30 June 1970, the Jan Sangh withdrew its support to the Ministry and preferred to sit in Opposition. At the end of June, after withdrawal of the Jan Sangh support, the opposition parties challenged the propriety of the continuance of Badal Ministry without a majority in the House. Former Chief Minister Gurnam Singh, Leader of Opposition Harinder Singh and Avtar Singh (Secretary of CPI) demanded that as the present Government lacked the majority, the Assembly should be summoned immediately to test the Akali claim of majority support there.

On 30 June, when Chief Minister along with two Cabinet Ministers, Balwant Singh and Surjit Singh, called on Governor, the latter advised the Chief Minister to call "as early as possible" a session of the State Assembly to demonstrate his majority in the House. On 1 July, three members of the ruling Akali Party informed the Governor that they were no longer with Badal Government. These were Nawab of Malerkotla Iftikhar Ali Khan, Gurdip Singh Shaheed and Ajit Singh Talwandi. On the following day, two more Akali MLAs, Surinder Singh Kairon, Hari Singh Beas joined Gurnam Singh's faction. On 3 July, Pratap Singh and on 4 July, Pritam Singh Dhariwal also joined Gurnam Singh's faction.

After pressure from Governor, Prakash Singh Badal had called for three day session of State Legislative Assembly to prove his majority in the House on 5 August. However, question by opposition leaders on such a long delay, later on it was decided to convene the Assembly session on 24 July at 2.00 p.m.

On the first day of its sitting two motions of expressing no-confidence in the Ministry was moved. One was by Satyapal Dang of CPI and other was by Balram Das Tandon of Jan Sangh. The two no-confidence motions failed to get the admittance in the Assembly for want of the requisite support of 21 MLAs. Only 19 members rose in their seats in support of the motions. Those who stood in support were 8 members of Akali Dal (Gurnam faction), 7 of Jan Sangh and 4 of CPI. 28 members of Congress stayed neutral.

In the 1971 Indian general election, out of the 12 contested seats by Akali Dal, only one was won by it and that was too with a narrow margin. While the CPI captured 2 and remaining 10 by Congress. This put a pressure on Akali Dal and specially on Prakash Singh Badal for remaining in the power at Punjab. Before Assembly session on 14 June 1971, Chief Minister, on 1 June, asked all the ministers to hand over their resignations to him. The CM also authorised by Party High Command to accept resignation of such among them as were considered corrupt or insufficient by him.

== Dissolution of assembly ==
Operation Toppling

On one side, Parkash Singh Badal was trying to save his Government, on the other hand, a secret plan to topple the Badal government was also afloat. On 12 June a closed door meeting of the Congressmen was held at Haryana Bhawan. The meeting was to expedite "Operation Toppling" and to install Gurnam Singh as Chief Minister with Congress support. On the same day, the dissidents led by Gurnam Singh held a closed door meeting at the residence of Harcharan Singh Brar and decided to revolt and stage a coup against Badal. Gurnam Singh had successfully brought about defection of 18 Akali legislators. With the help of the 29 Congress legislators and some more defectors from the Akali Dal, Gurnam Singh planned the downfall of Badal Ministry.

Resignation

On the following day, rebel Akalis numbering about 17, including six ministers along with Gurnam Singh sought an audience with Governor to acquaint him with the loss of majority support to Badal Government. This was to be done with a view to forestalling the possibility of the dissolution of the State Assembly. Gurnam Singh reached Raj Bhawan at 1.40 p.m. But the Chief Minister, Parkash Singh Badal stole a march over him by submitting the resignation of his Council of Ministers and advising the Governor to dissolve the State Legislature with a view to seeking fresh mandate from the people. The Governor accepted the resignation as well as the advice and dissolved the Assembly with immediate effect. Gurnam Singh and Darbara Singh (Speaker of Punjab Assembly) vehemently opposed the decision of Governor. On 15 June 1971, President's rule was imposed in the State of Punjab.
