= 8th Punjab Assembly =

Law governing body of Punjab

Eighth Punjab Legislative Assembly
- Punjab Legislative Assembly

Type
- Type: Unicameral

History
- Founded: 23 June 1980
- Disbanded: 26 June 1985
- Preceded by: Seventh Punjab Legislative Assembly
- Succeeded by: Ninth Punjab Legislative Assembly

Leadership
- Speaker: Brij Bhushan Mehra
- Deputy Speaker: Guizar Singh
- Leader of House (Chief Minister): Darbara Singh (1980-1983)
- Leader of the Opposition: Parkash Singh Badal (1980-1983)

Structure
- Seats: 117
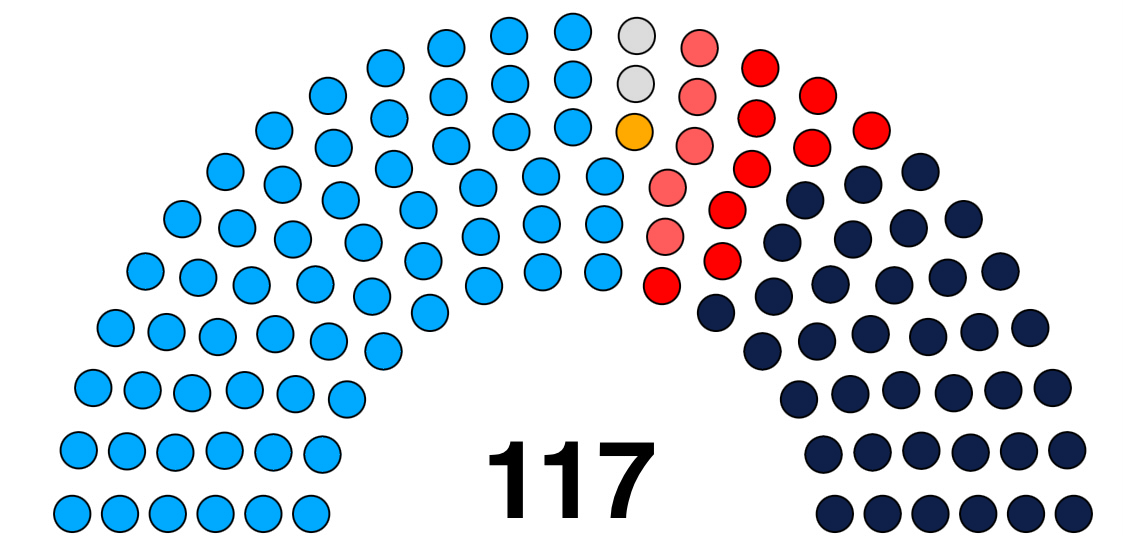
- Political groups: Government (63) (Note: The given members of parties were at the time of the formation of the Government. The numbers changed later on due to defections, resignations, mergers or splits): INC (63); Opposition (54): SAD (37); CPI (9); CPIM (5); BJS (1); IND (2)
- Length of term: 1980-1985

Elections
- Voting system: first-past-the-post
- Last election: 1980
- Next election: 1985

The 1980 Punjab Legislative Assembly election was the eighth Vidhan Sabha (Legislative Assembly) election of the state. Indian National Congress emerged as the victorious with 63 seats in the 117-seat legislature in the election. The Shiromani Akali Dal became the official opposition, holding 37 seats. On 6 October 1983, Assembly was placed under suspension and president rule was imposed (Note: President's rule may be imposed when the "government in a state is not able to function as per the Constitution", which often happens because no party or coalition has a majority in the assembly. When President's rule is in force in a state, its council of ministers stands dissolved. The office of chief minister thus lies vacant, and the administration is taken over by the governor, who functions on behalf of the central government. At times, the legislative assembly also stands dissolved.) and then dissolved on 26 June 1985.
