= Harinder Singh =

Harinder Singh may refer to:

- Harinder Singh (Punjab politician), member of Punjab Legislative Assembly
- Harinder Singh (Haryana politician), member of Haryana Legislative Assembly
- Harinder Singh (general), general of the Indian Army
