= Gurbinder Kaur Brar =

Indian politician

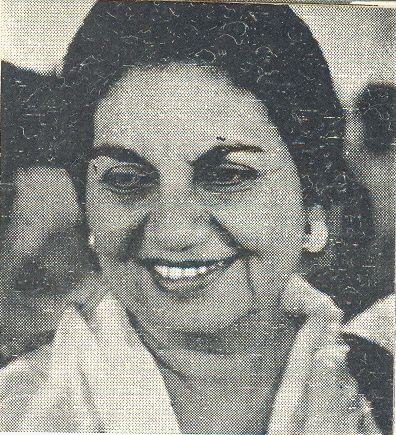

Leader of Opposition in Punjab Assembly
- In office 29 September 1985 – 11 May 1987
- Preceded by: Prakash Singh Badal
- Succeeded by: Satnam Singh Kainth
- Constituency: Muktsar

Member of 7th Lok Sabha
- In office 1980–1984
- Preceded by: Balwant Singh Ramoowalia
- Succeeded by: Shaminder Singh
- Constituency: Faridkot

Personal details
- Born: 12 August 1922 Kairon, Punjab, British India
- Died: 7 September 2013 (aged 91) Chandigarh, India
- Party: Indian National Congress
- Spouse: Harcharan Singh Brar

Gurbrinder Kaur Brar (12 August 1922 – 7 September 2013) was an Indian National Congress (INC) politician from the state of Punjab, India.

== Early life ==
Gurbinder Kaur was born in Kairon village of Amritsar district on 12 August 1922 to Jaswant Singh and his wife. She graduated from Kinnaird College, Lahore and received her Master of Arts degree from Government College, Lahore. She was a niece of Partap Singh Kairon.

== Career ==
In her youth Brar joined the Indian National Congress party and in recognition of her work, she was appointed the head of Ferozepur district's Congress Committee in 1964, a post she held till 1970. She also served as the vice-president of Bharatiya Grameen Mahila Sangh.

Brar contested her first assembly election in 1972 from Malout and defeated Gurmeet Singh of the Shiromani Akali Dal (SAD) by a margin of 11,676 votes. The following year, Zail Singh, then Chief Minister of Punjab included Brar in his cabinet. She was made a Minister of State for Housing and Slum Clearance, Relief and Rehabilitation, Urban Development and Urban Estates and Habitat.

Later the Congress party fielded Brar in Faridkot for the elections to the 7th Lok Sabha, from where she defeated SAD's Balwant Singh Ramoowalia, polling 50.43% of votes against his 46.06%. During her tenure as a Member of Parliament, she served on the Committee on Public Undertakings. A year after completing her term in the central legislature, she contested the 1985 Punjab assembly election from Muktsar and defeated her nearest rival by 5,277 votes. SAD formed the government after gaining absolute majority while Brar was chosen the leader of the opposition in the state assembly.

After her husband Harcharan Singh Brar became the chief minister, she acted as Punjab Pradesh Congress Committee's de facto chief for a short time in 1996.

== Personal life ==
Gurbinder married Harcharan Singh Brar on 24 February 1948. Together they had a son Adesh Kanwarjit Singh Brar and a daughter Kamaljit 'Babli' Brar. She died on 7 September 2013 at Postgraduate Institute of Medical Education and Research, Chandigarh.
