= 9th Punjab Assembly =

Law governing body of Punjab

Ninth Punjab Legislative Assembly
- Punjab Legislative Assembly

Type
- Type: Unicameral

History
- Founded: 14 October 1985
- Disbanded: 11 May 1987
- Preceded by: Eighth Punjab Legislative Assembly
- Succeeded by: 10th Punjab Assembly

Leadership
- Speaker: Ravi Inder Singh (1985-1986)
- Surjit Singh Minhas (1986-1987)
- Deputy Speaker: Nirmal Singh Kahlon (1985-1986)
- Jaswant Singh (1986-1987)
- Leader of House (Chief Minister): Surjit Singh Barnala
- Leader of the Opposition: Gurbinder Kaur Brar

Structure
- Seats: 117
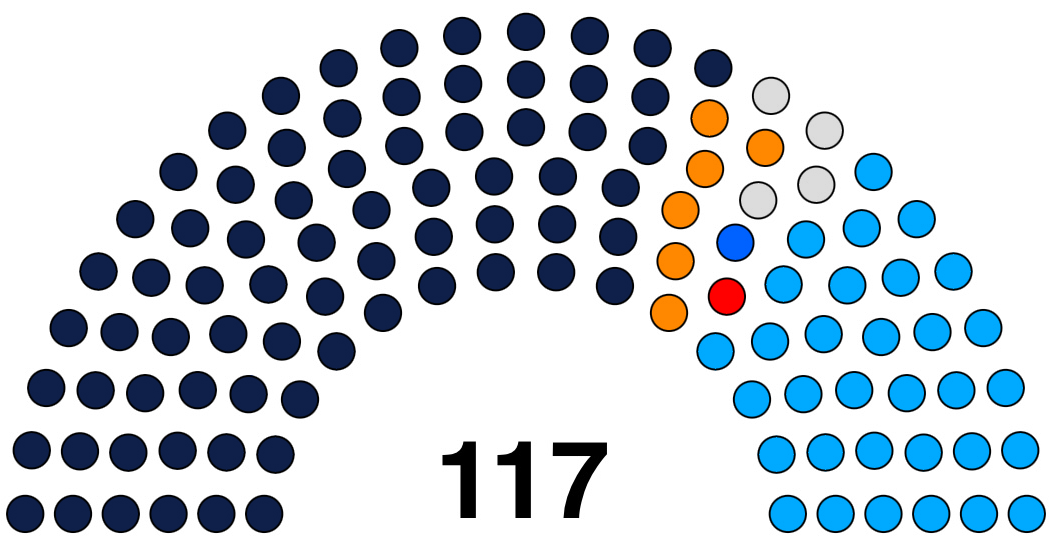
- Political groups: Government (73) (Note: The given members of parties were at the time of the formation of the Government. The numbers changed later on due to defections, resignations, mergers or splits): SAD (73); Opposition (44): INC (32); BJP (6); CPI (1); JP (1); IND (4)
- Length of term: 1985-1987

Elections
- Voting system: first-past-the-post
- Last election: 1985
- Next election: 1992

The 1985 Punjab Legislative Assembly election was the ninth Vidhan Sabha (Legislative Assembly) election of the state. Shiromani Akali Dal emerged as the victorious with 73 seats in the 117-seat legislature in the election. The Indian National Congress became the official opposition, holding 34 seats. On 11 May 1987, Assembly was dissolved and president rule was imposed. (Note: President's rule may be imposed when the "government in a state is not able to function as per the Constitution", which often happens because no party or coalition has a majority in the assembly. When President's rule is in force in a state, its council of ministers stands dissolved. The office of chief minister thus lies vacant, and the administration is taken over by the governor, who functions on behalf of the central government. At times, the legislative assembly also stands dissolved.)
