= Thakur Das Bhargava =

Indian politician (1886-1962)

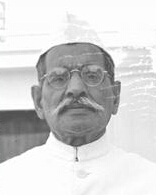

Member of Parliament, Lok Sabha
- In office 1957–1962
- Preceded by: Lala Achint Ram
- Succeeded by: Mani Ram Bagri
- Constituency: Hissar, Punjab
- In office 1952–1957
- Preceded by: Office established
- Succeeded by: Abul Kalam Azad
- Constituency: Gurgaon, Punjab

Member of the Provisional Parliament
- In office 1950–1952
- Constituency: East Punjab

Member of the Constituent Assembly
- In office 1947–1950
- Constituency: East Punjab

Member of the Central Legislative Assembly
- In office 1945–1947
- In office 1926–1930
- Preceded by: Lala Dunichand
- Succeeded by: Bhai Parmanand
- Constituency: Ambala General

Personal details
- Born: 15 November 1886
- Died: 13 December 1962 (76 years)
- Party: Indian National Congress
- Spouse: Roop Rani
- Parent: Munshi Badri Prasad
- Relatives: Gopi Chand Bhargava (Brother)

Pandit Thakur Das Bhargava was an Indian politician. He was a Member of Parliament, representing Hissar, Haryana in the Lok Sabha the lower house of India's Parliament as a member of the Indian National Congress. He was also a member of the Constituent Assembly of India. He was a student of Forman Christian College, Lahore and Presidency College, Calcutta.
