= 6th Punjab Assembly =

Law governing body of Punjab

Sixth Punjab Legislative Assembly
- Punjab Legislative Assembly

Type
- Type: Unicameral

History
- Founded: 21 March 1972
- Disbanded: 30 April 1977
- Preceded by: Fifth Punjab Legislative Assembly
- Succeeded by: Seventh Punjab Legislative Assembly

Leadership
- Speaker: Darbara Singh (1972-1973)
- Kewal Krishan (1973-1977)
- Deputy Speaker: Kewal Krishan (1972-1973)
- Nasib Singh Gill (1973-1977)
- Leader of House (Chief Minister): Zail Singh
- Leader of the Opposition: Jaswinder Singh Brar (1972)
- Parkash Singh Badal (1972-1977)

Structure
- Seats: 104
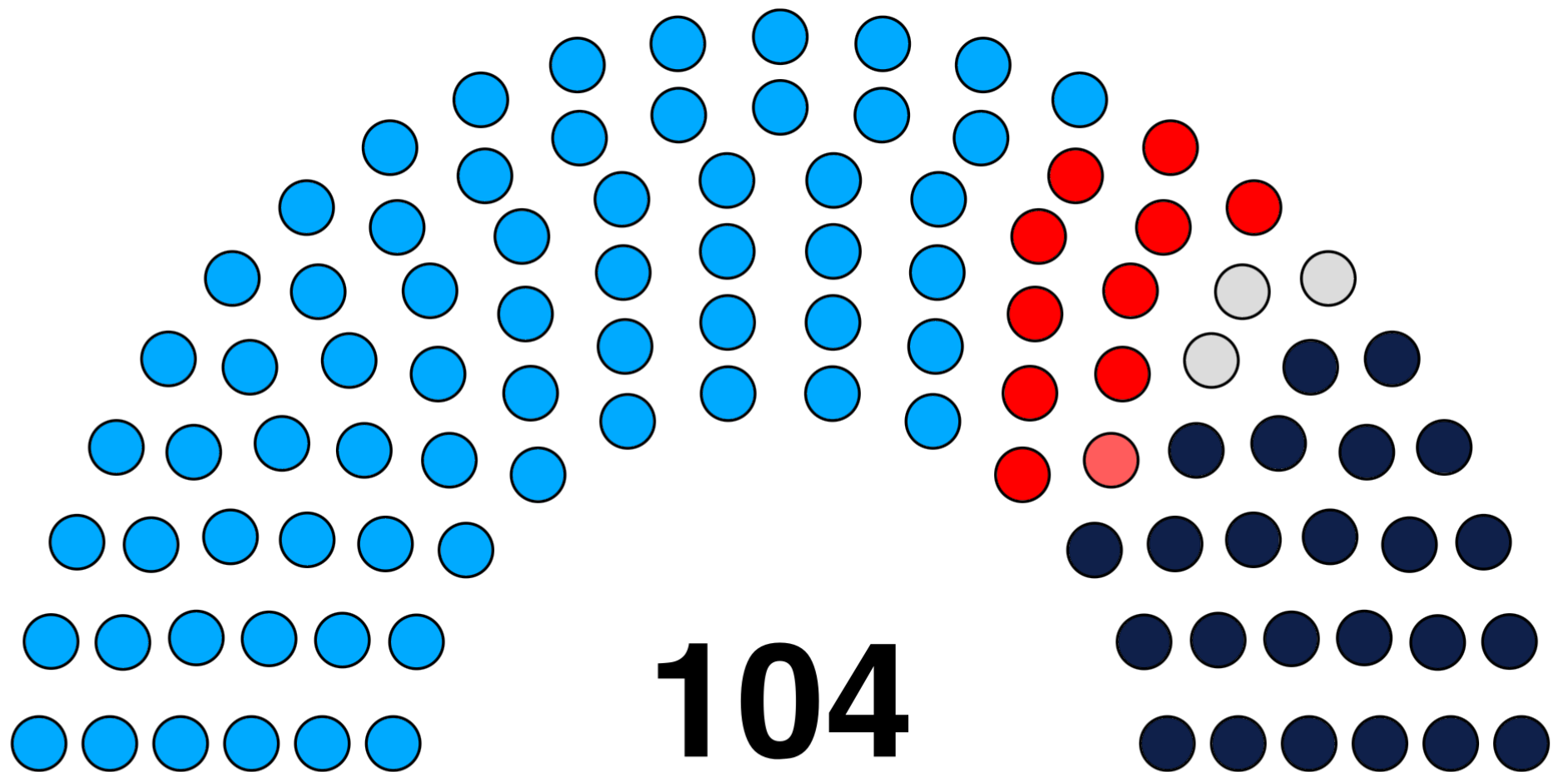
- Political groups: Government (76) (Note: The given members of parties were at the time of the formation of the Government. The numbers changed later on due to defections, resignations, mergers or splits): INC (66); CPI (10); Opposition (28): SAD (24); CPIM (1); IND (3)
- Length of term: 1972-1977

Elections
- Voting system: first-past-the-post
- Last election: 1972
- Next election: 1977

The 1972 Punjab Legislative Assembly election was the sixth Vidhan Sabha (Legislative Assembly) election of the state. Indian National Congress emerged as the victorious party with 66 seats in the 104-seat legislature in the election. The Shiromani Akali Dal became the official opposition, holding 24 seats. On 30 April 1977, Assembly dissolved and president rule was imposed. (Note: President's rule may be imposed when the "government in a state is not able to function as per the Constitution", which often happens because no party or coalition has a majority in the assembly. When President's rule is in force in a state, its council of ministers stands dissolved. The office of chief minister thus lies vacant, and the administration is taken over by the governor, who functions on behalf of the central government. At times, the legislative assembly also stands dissolved.)

== Background ==
A mid-term poll in 1972 was necessary due to political parties' failure to form a stable government after the 1969 election. This time Congress had already made a pre-poll alliance with Communist Party of India and both parties collectively won 76 seats and formed coalition ministry on 17 March 1972 and Giani Zail Singh became the Chief Minister.

== History ==
After government formation, tussle between Congress and CPI erupted over the students’ agitation and strikes by teachers of the private Colleges in the State. In the meantime, Congress party also strengthened its position and ultimately forced CPI to quit the alliance. On 13 November 1972, the CPI announced its decision to withdraw the support from Zail Singh ministry. After withdrawal of the support, Congress was confronted with No-confidence motion tabled against ministry in December 1972.

=== First no-confidence motion ===
The first No-confidence motion against Zail Singh Government was moved by Surjit Singh Barnala and Ajaib Singh Sandhu of Akali Dal on 12 December 1972 on the grounds of corruption and maladministration. Earlier two motions of no-confidence was tabled by Satpal Dang, Jangir Singh, Shamsher Singh Josh and Darshan Singh, all from CPI, were not admitted for want of necessary numerical support as prescribed under the rule.

The motion was discussed by 8 members from ruling and opposition benches. The motion, when put to vote, was negatived by voice vote.

=== Speaker’s resignation ===
The Congress party was a divided House. The dominant Congress factions were, one led by the Chief Minister and other was by Swaran Singh and Assembly Speaker, Darbara Singh. The Harchand Singh Committee report on land grabbing further aggravated the situation as the committee indicated the name of Speaker Darbara Singh. State Government advised the Speaker to resign but Darbara Singh refused to do so.

In July 1973, at the behest of the Chief Minister, 39 out 68 MLAs of Congress Legislators called upon the Speaker to resign immediately from his office. However, Swaran Singh came to the rescue of Darbara Singh. He gave his unequivocal support. After two months, Congress High Command exonerated Darbara Singh. Thus cause considerable embarrassment to the Chief Minister and Punjab Congress Chief. After this murky episode. Darbara Singh triumphantly resigned from the Speakership and Kewal Kishan, Deputy Speaker, stepped into his shoes.

=== Second no-confidence motion ===
Two notices of No-confidence motion was received by Speaker Kewal Kishan against Congress government on 5 August 1974. The first motion stood on the name of Satyapal Dang and seven other members but it was rejected by the house for the want of the requisite number of members supporting it for admission. The second motion was admitted and was on the name of Parkash Singh Badal and other three members. The grounds for bringing the motion were, inflation, corruption and breakdown of law and order.

In all, total 8 members participated in the debate from ruling and opposition benches. The motion was negatived with 26 members voting in favour and 60 members voting against it.

== Dissolution of Assembly ==
In June 1975, Indira Gandhi’s Government declared National Emergency in India. It provided a handy tool to the Chief Minister to deal with the opposition with a firm hand. Against emergency, there was a huge protests in Punjab, specially led by Shiromani Akali Dal from Akal Takhat at Amritsar.

Due to Emergency, the tenure of Punjab Assembly extended by month. The tenure which was to be expired on 21 March 1977, was extended till 30 April 1977. In March 1977 general election, Janata Party formed the Government at Union. The new Janata Party Government suggested in April to the Chief Minister that they should advise the Governor to dissolve the Assembly and seek a fresh mandate. The suggestion was , however, spurned. On the other hand, efforts were made to contest the validity of the Center’s suggestion. While declining to intervene, the Supreme Court of India upheld the constitutional validity of the Central Government’s approach. On 29 April, the situation of the State along with other nine States, reviewed by Union Home Minister and proclamations dissolving the State Assemblies under Article 356 of the Indian Constitution were issued by the Acting President of India on 30 April 1977.
