= Captain Rattan Singh =

Indian politician

Rattan Singh

Member of Punjab Legislative Assembly
- In office 1962–1972
- Preceded by: Dasonda Singh
- Succeeded by: Darshan Singh
- Constituency: Garhshankar
- In office 1972–1977
- Preceded by: Constituency created
- Succeeded by: Daya Singh
- Constituency: Kum Kalan

Personal details
- Born: 23 August 1920 Village Rampur Bilron, Garhshankar
- Died: 26 December 2006
- Party: Indian National Congress

Captain Rattan Singh was a freedom fighter and Punjabi politician who was the Member of Punjab Legislative Assembly (1962-1977) and also served as Minister of State for Agriculture and Animal Husbandry in Ram Kishan and Giani Gurmukh Singh Musafir's cabinet and Minister of Rural Development in Zail Singh cabinet.

== Early life ==
Rattan Singh completed Chartered accountant from University of Edinburgh. Then went to Malaysia for work.

== Freedom struggle ==
When he met General Mohan Singh who formed Indian National Army (INA), he was influenced from his spirit and he left his job and joined INA. He became General's Aide-de-camp of General Mohan Singh.

== Political career ==
His political career started when he entered into Punjab Legislative Assembly from Garhshankar Assembly Constituency in 1962 and then he won next two elections from the same Constituency. Ram Kishan and Giani Gurmukh Singh Musafir inducted him into his cabinet in 1964 and 1966 respectively.

In 1967 and 1969, when Non-Congress governments formed in Punjab, he became the Deputy Leader of Opposition.

In 1972 he won election from Kum Kalan Assembly Constituency and became Minister of Rural Development in Giani Zail Singh's cabinet. However, he resigned from the Cabinet due to differences with Chief Minister and took retirement from active politics.

== Later life ==
After taking retirement from active politics, he worked for the farmers welfare in Punjab and also introduced many new reforms in Agriculture sector. He is also known for introduction of High-yielding variety wheat and other crops which were tested by Punjab Agricultural University.
