= Brij Bhushan Mehra =

Indian politician

Brij Bhushan Mehra was speaker of Punjab Legislative Assembly and a leader of Indian National Congress. He was killed by the suspected Sikh militants in 1991 in Amritsar.
