= 7th Punjab Assembly =

Law governing body of Punjab

Seventh Punjab Legislative Assembly
- Punjab Legislative Assembly

Type
- Type: Unicameral

History
- Founded: 30 June 1977
- Disbanded: 17 February 1980
- Preceded by: Sixth Punjab Legislative Assembly
- Succeeded by: Eighth Punjab Legislative Assembly

Leadership
- Speaker: Ravi Inder Singh
- Deputy Speaker: Panna Lal Nayyar
- Leader of House (Chief Minister): Parkash Singh Badal
- Leader of the Opposition: Balram Jakhar

Structure
- Seats: 117
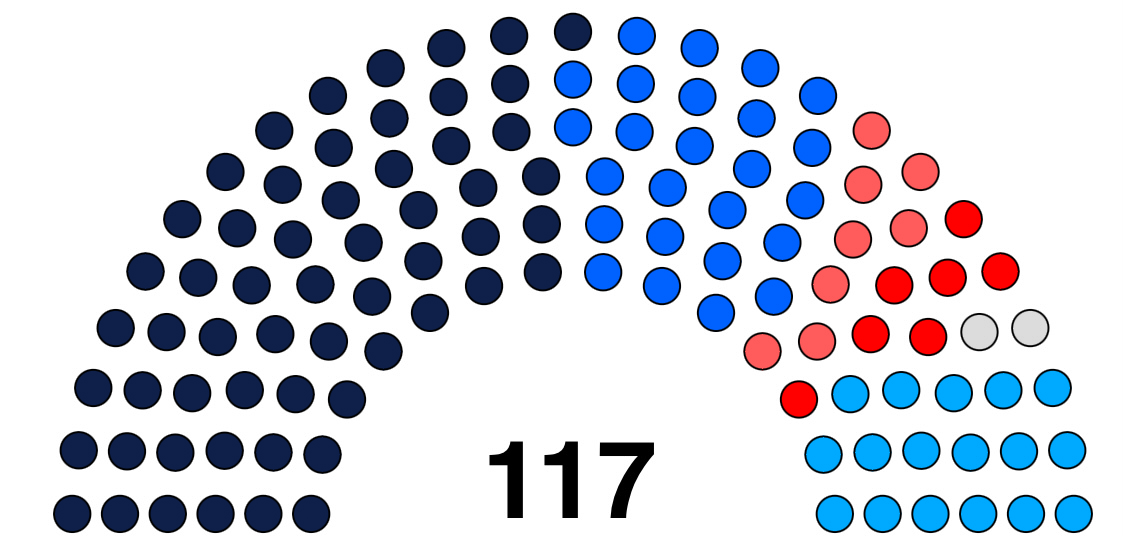
- Political groups: Government (98) (Note: The given members of parties were at the time of the formation of the Government. The numbers changed later on due to defections, resignations, mergers or splits): SAD+ (83); SAD (58); JP (25); Confidence and supply (15); CPIM (8); CPI (7); Opposition (19): INC (17); IND (2)
- Length of term: 1977-1980

Elections
- Voting system: first-past-the-post
- Last election: 1977
- Next election: 1980

The 1977 Punjab Legislative Assembly election was the seventh Vidhan Sabha (Legislative Assembly) election of the state. Shiromani Akali Dal and Janata Party coalition emerged as the victorious with 83 seats in the 117-seat legislature in the election. The Indian National Congress became the official opposition, holding 17 seats. On 17 February 1980, Assembly dissolved prematurely and president rule was imposed. (Note: President's rule may be imposed when the "government in a state is not able to function as per the Constitution", which often happens because no party or coalition has a majority in the assembly. When President's rule is in force in a state, its council of ministers stands dissolved. The office of chief minister thus lies vacant, and the administration is taken over by the governor, who functions on behalf of the central government. At times, the legislative assembly also stands dissolved.)

== History ==
After withdrawal of National Emergency in India, fresh election held in Punjab along with other States. Shiromani Akali Dal and Janata Party fought election in coalition and won. Communist Party of India and Communist Party of India (Marxist) extended outside support to the Government.

Despite Indian National Congress contested more seats than Janata Party but could able to won 17 seats and stood at third place for the first time in Punjab.
