= Harinder Singh (Punjab politician) =

Indian politician

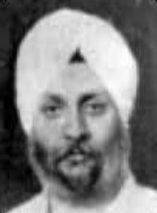

Leader of the Opposition in the Punjab Assembly
- In office 17 February 1969 – 14 June 1971
- Preceded by: Gurnam Singh
- Succeeded by: Jaswinder Singh Brar
- Constituency: Ajnala

Member of the Punjab Legislative Assembly
- In office 1962–1967
- Preceded by: Achhar Singh Chhina
- Succeeded by: Dalip Singh
- Constituency: Ajnala
- In office 1969–1972
- Preceded by: Dalip Singh
- Succeeded by: Harcharan Singh
- Constituency: Ajnala

Personal details
- Born: c. 1917
- Died: 31 August 1972 (aged 55) Amritsar, India
- Party: Indian National Congress

Major Harinder Singh (c. 1917 – 31 August 1972) was an Indian politician in Punjab who served as Leader of the Opposition in the Punjab Assembly from 1969 to 1971, and also as Minister of Revenue and Industry in Giani Gurmukh Singh Musafir's cabinet from 1966 to 1967. He was also a member of the Central Legislative Assembly after winning the election in the 1945 general election. Singh died in Amritsar on 31 August 1972, at the age of 55.
