= Gopi Chand Bhargava =

First chief minister of Punjab

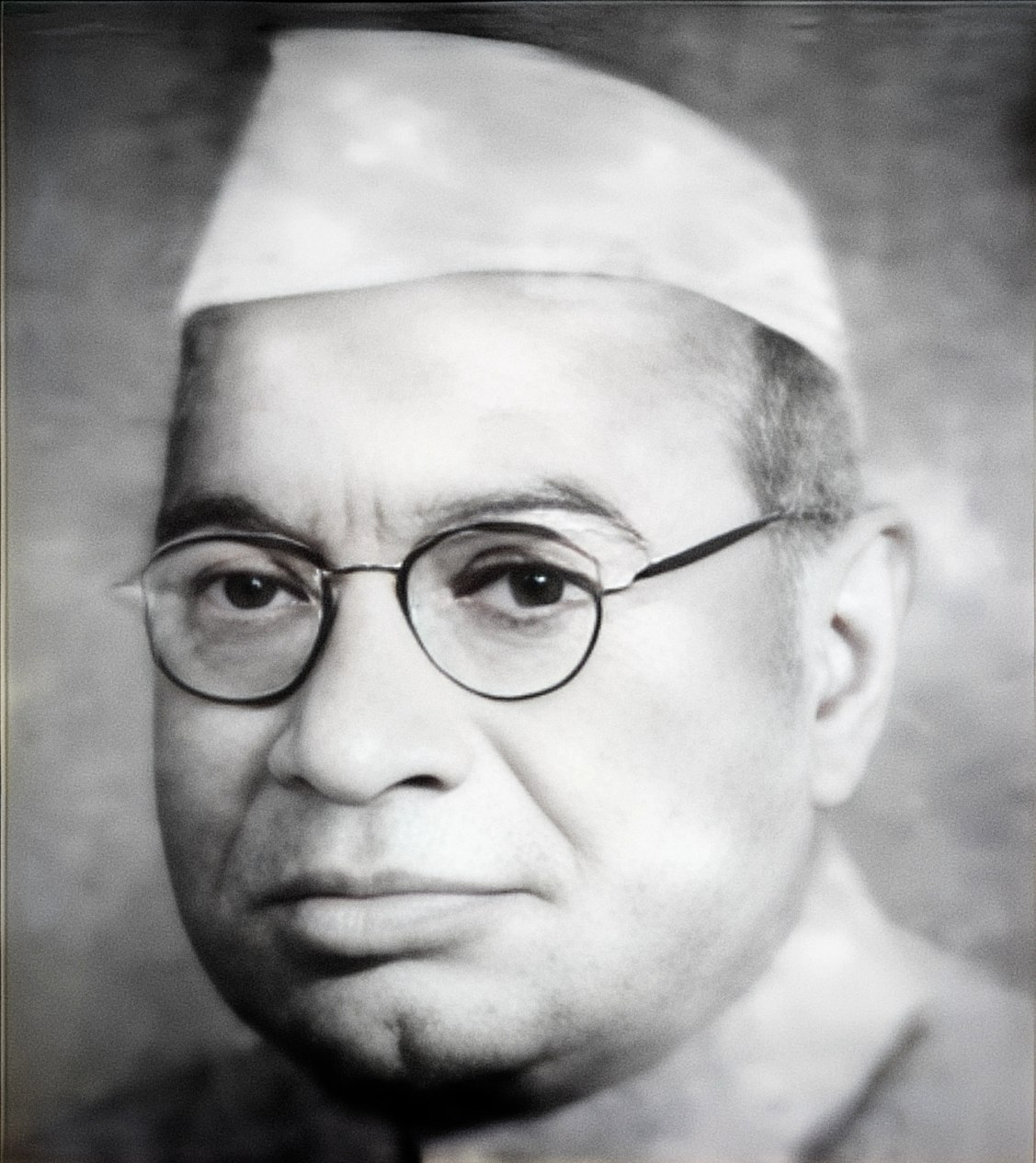

1st Chief Minister of Punjab
- In office 15 August 1947 – 13 April 1949
- Preceded by: Post Established
- Succeeded by: Bhim Sen Sachar
- In office 18 October 1949 – 20 June 1951
- Preceded by: Bhim Sen Sachar
- Succeeded by: President's rule
- In office 21 June 1964 – 6 July 1964 (acting)
- Preceded by: Partap Singh Kairon
- Succeeded by: Ram Kishan

Leader of Opposition in Punjab Provincial Assembly
- In office 1937–1940
- Preceded by: Post Established
- Succeeded by: Sardar Sampuran Singh

Personal details
- Born: 8 March 1889 Sirsa, Punjab, British Raj
- Died: 26 December 1966 (aged 77)
- Party: Indian National Congress
- Profession: Politician

Gopi Chand Bhargava (8 March 1889 – 26 December 1966) was the first Chief Minister of Punjab from 15 August 1947 to 13 April 1949, and again between 18 October 1949, to 20 June 1951, and for the third time as acting Chief Minister between 21 June 1964, and 6 July 1964. He was a member of the Congress.

== Personal and family life ==
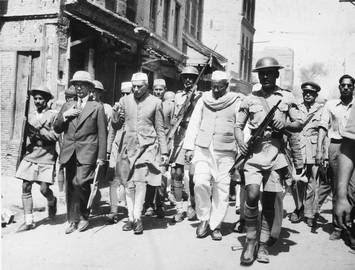

He was born on 8 March 1889 in Sirsa district of Punjab province in British Raj. In the year 1912, he completed his M.B.B.S. degree from Medical College (Lahore) and then started the medical profession in 1913.

His brother, Pandit Thakur Das Bhargava, was also an INC politician, former Member of parliament, freedom fighter, lawyer, founder of "Vidya Pracharini Sabha" and several schools and colleges including Thakur Dass Bhargava Senior Secondary Model School and Fateh Chand College for Women at Hisar.

== See also ==
- List of chief ministers of Punjab (India)
- List of chief ministers of Haryana
