= Darbara Singh (speaker) =

Indian politician (1927–1998)

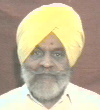

Governor of Rajasthan
- In office 1 May 1998 – 24 May 1998
- Preceded by: Bali Ram Bhagat
- Succeeded by: Navrang Lal Tibrewal

Speaker of the Punjab Legislative Assembly
- In office 14 March 1969 – 3 September 1973
- Preceded by: Joginder Singh Mann
- Succeeded by: Kewal Krishan

Member of 11th Lok Sabha
- In office 1996–1998
- Preceded by: Umrao Singh
- Succeeded by: Inder Kumar Gujral
- Constituency: Jalandhar

Personal details
- Born: 25 February 1927 Lyallpur, British India (now in Pakistan)
- Died: 24 May 1998 (aged 71) Rajasthan, India
- Party: Shiromani Akali Dal (1996–1998)
- Other political affiliations: Indian National Congress (1972–1996), Independent (until 1972)
- Spouse: Prabjot Kaur
- Parent: Mangal Singh

Darbara Singh (25 February 1927 – 24 May 1998) was an Indian politician who served as Speaker of the Punjab Legislative Assembly, Member of Parliament in the 11th Lok Sabha, and briefly as the 14th Governor of Rajasthan.

== Early life ==
He was born on 25 February 1927 in Lyallpur, British India (now in Pakistan). Singh began his political career as an independent candidate before joining major political parties.

== Political career ==
Darbara Singh was elected to the Punjab Legislative Assembly in 1967 and 1969 from the Nakodar constituency as an independent candidate. He served as Deputy Minister for Public Works in 1967. In 1969, he was elected Speaker of the Punjab Legislative Assembly, serving until 1973.

He joined the Indian National Congress in 1972 and remained with the party until 1996.

== Member of Parliament ==
In 1996, he was elected to the 11th Lok Sabha from Jalandhar as a member of the Shiromani Akali Dal. In 1998, he vacated the seat for former Prime Minister Inder Kumar Gujral.

== Governor of Rajasthan ==
Darbara Singh was appointed as the 14th Governor of Rajasthan on 1 May 1998. He served in the position until his death on 24 May 1998.

== Personal life ==
He was married to Prabjot Kaur and was the son of Mangal Singh.

== Death ==
He died in office on 24 May 1998 in Rajasthan at the age of 71.
