= 1985 Punjab Legislative Assembly election =

Legislative Assembly election in Punjab, India

- 26 September 1985

All 117 seats in the Punjab Legislative Assembly 59 seats needed for a majority
- Registered: 10,728,825
- Turnout: 67.53% (▲2.17%)
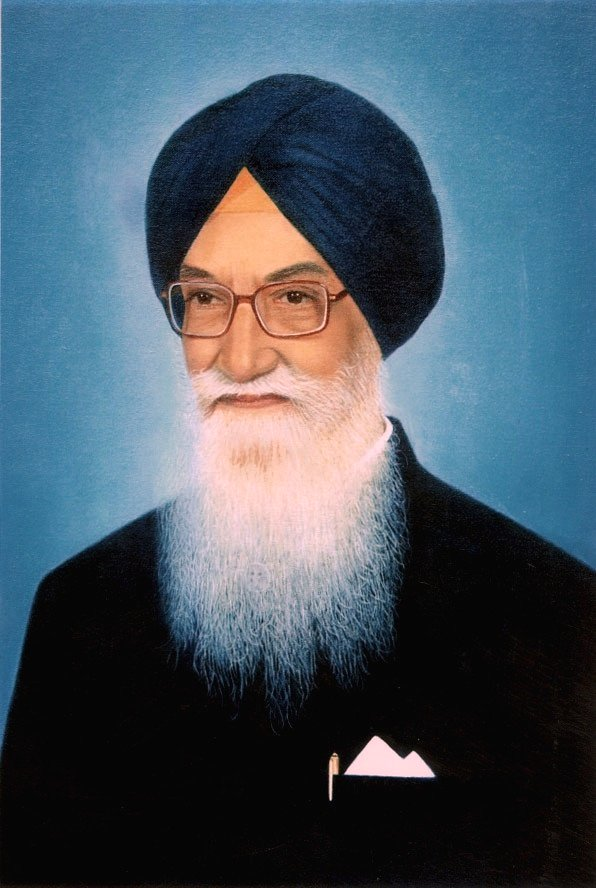

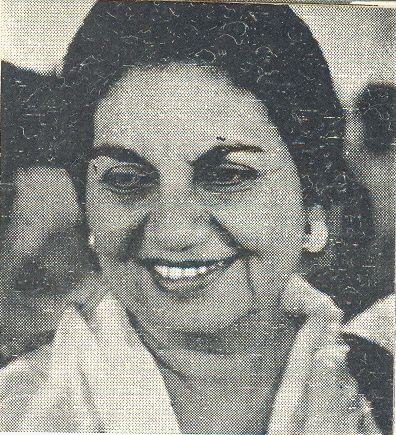
	First party	Second party
Leader	Surjit Singh Barnala	Gurbinder Kaur Brar
Party	SAD	INC
Leader's seat	Barnala (won)	Muktsar (won)
Seats won	73	32
Seat change	▲36	▼31
Popular vote	2,630,270	2,620,042
Percentage	38.01%	37.86%
Swing	▲11.1%	▼7.4%
CM before election
President's rule
INC
Elected CM
Surjit Singh Barnala
SAD

Election where held in Punjab on 26 September 1985, to elect the members of Punjab Legislative Assembly. The signing of the Rajiv–Longowal Accord between Indian Prime Minister Rajiv Gandhi and the Akali leader, Harchand Singh Longowal, on 24 July 1985 paved the way to holding this elections. The election were hald alongside the election to the Lok Sabha, Which were not held in 1984.

== Voter statistics ==
Electors

Title	Men	Women	Total
No. of electors	5879025	4849800	10728825
No. of electors who voted	4009724	3235557	7245281
Polling Percentage	68.20%	66.72%	67.53%

No. of valid votes 6920818

No. of voted rejected 324463

No. of polling stations 12698

=== Performance of women and men candidates ===
Title	Men	WomenEN	TotalAL
No. of contestants	824	33	857
Elected	113	4	117
Forfeited deposits	582	13	595

== Constituencies Data ==
=== No. of constituencies ===
Type of Constituency	Gen.	SC	St	Total
No. of constituencies	88	29	0	117

== Results ==
=== Result by Party ===
Result of Punjab Legislative Assembly election 1985
Party	contested	Seats won	change in seats	popular vote	%
Shiromani Akali Dal	100	73	▲23	26,30,270	38.01
Indian National Congress	117	32	▼31	26,20,042	37.86
Bharatiya Janata Party	26	6	▲5	3,45,560	4.99
Communist Party of India	38	1	▼8	3,07,496	4.44
Janata Party	5	1	▲1	75,307	1.09
Independents	542	4	▲2	8,09,254	11.69
Others	29	0	-	1,32,889	1.92
Total	857	117		69,20,818	

== Results by Region ==
=== Region wise results ===
Region	Seats					
Region	Seats	SAD	INC	BJP	CPI	OTH
Malwa	65	48	12	2	1	2
Majha	27	14	10	2	0	1
Doaba	25	11	10	2	0	2
Sum	117	73	32	6	1	5

== Results By Constituency ==
#	Constituency	Party	Winner
1	Fatehgarh	SAD	Nirmal Singh
2	Batala	INC	Ashwani
3	Qadian	SAD	Kulwant Singh
4	Sri Hargobindpur	SAD	Natha Singh
5	Kahnuwan	SAD	Johar Singh
6	Dhariwal	SAD	Sucha Singh Chottepur
7	Gurdaspur	INC	Susheel
8	Dina Nagar (SC)	INC	Jai Muni
9	Narot Mehra (SC)	BJP	Ram Lal
10	Pathankot	BJP	Mohan Lal
11	Sujanpur	INC	Raghu Nath Sahai
12	Beas	INC	Sant Singh
13	Majitha	INC	Surinder Pal Singh
14	Verka	INC	Dalbir Singh
15	Jandiala (SC)	SAD	Ranjit Singh
16	Amritsar North	INC	Brij Bhushan Mehra
17	Amritsar West	INC	Sewa Ram
18	Amritsar Central	INC	Darbari Lal
19	Amritsar South	JP	Kirpal Singh S/O Uttam Singh
20	Ajnala	SAD	Rattan Singh
21	Raja Sansi	SAD	Shashpal Singh
22	Attari (SC)	SAD	Tara Singh
23	Tarn Taran	SAD	Prem Singh Lalpura
24	Khadoor Sahib (SC)	SAD	Tara Singh
25	Naushahra Panwan	SAD	Harbhajan Singh
26	Patti	SAD	Niranjan Singh
27	Valtoha	SAD	Major Singh
28	Adampur	SAD	Surjit Singh
29	Jullundur Cantonment	INC	Indira
30	Jullundur North	BJP	Vaid Om Prakash Dutt
31	Jullundur Central	BJP	Manmohan Kalia
32	Jullundur South (SC)	INC	Mohinder Singh Kaypee
33	Kartarpur (SC)	INC	Jagjit Singh
34	Lohian	SAD	Balwant Singh
35	Nakodar	SAD	Kuleep Singh Wadala
36	Nur Mahal	SAD	Surinder Paul Singh
37	Banga (SC)	SAD	Balwant Singh
38	Nawanshahr	INC	Dilbagh Singh
39	Phillaur (SC)	SAD	Sarwan Singh
40	Bholath	SAD	Sukhjinder Singh
41	Kapurthala	INC	Kripal Singh
42	Sultanpur	SAD	Bachan Singh
43	Phagwara (SC)	INC	Joginder Singh Mann
44	Balachaur	Independent	Ram Kishan
45	Garhshankar	INC	Sarwan Ram
46	Mahilpur (SC)	SAD	Jagdish Kaur
47	Hoshiarpur	INC	Mohan Lal
48	Sham Chaurasi (SC)	INC	Hari Mittar
49	Tanda	SAD	Uplar Singh
50	Garhdiwala (SC)	SAD	Prakash Singh
51	Dasuya	Independent	Romesh Chander
52	Mukerian	INC	Kewal Krishan
53	Jagraon	SAD	Gurdip Singh
54	Raikot	SAD	Talib Singh
55	Dakha (SC)	SAD	Basant Singh
56	Qila Raipur	SAD	Arjan Singh
57	Ludhiana North	INC	Satpal Prashar
58	Ludhiana West	INC	Harnam Dass Johar
59	Ludhiana East	INC	Om Parkash Gupta
60	Ludhiana Rural	SAD	Jagdev Singh Tajpuri
61	Payal	SAD	Davinder Singh
62	Kum Kalan (SC)	SAD	Rajinder Singh
63	Samrala	SAD	Amarjit Singh
64	Khanna (SC)	SAD	Sukhdev Singh
65	Nangal	INC	Ram Prakash Bali
66	Anandpur Sahib Ropar	SAD	Tara Singh
67	Chamkaur Sahib (SC)	INC	Bhag Singh
68	Morinda	SAD	Ravinder Singh
69	Kharar	SAD	Bachittar Singh
70	Banur	SAD	Kanwaljit Singh
71	Rajpura	SAD	Prem Chand
72	Ghanaur	SAD	Jasdev Singh Sandhu
73	Dakala	SAD	Prem Singh Chandumajra
74	Shutrana (SC)	SAD	Satwant Singh Mohi
75	Samana	SAD	Hardial Singh Rajla
76	Patiala Town	INC	Brahm Mohinder
77	Nabha	SAD	Narinder Singh
78	Amloh (SC)	SAD	Dalip Singh Pandhi
79	Sirhind	SAD	Kirpal Singh
80	Dhuri	SAD	Surinder Singh
81	Malerkotla	SAD	Nusrat Ali Khan
82	Sherpur (SC)	SAD	Gobind Singh
83	Barnala	SAD	Surjit Singh Barnala
84	Bhadaur (SC)	SAD	Kundan Singh
85	Dhanaula	SAD	Gobind Singh Longowal
86	Sangrur	SAD	Ranjit Singh
87	Dirbha	SAD	Baldev Singh
88	Sunam	SAD	Sukhdev Singh
89	Lehra	SAD	Inderjit Singh
90	Balluana (SC)	INC	Hansraj Arya
91	Abohar	BJP	Arjan Singh
92	Fazilka	BJP	Radha Krishan
93	Jalalabad	CPI	Mehtab Singh
94	Guru Har Sahai	Independent	Sajwar Singh
95	Firozepur	INC	Bal Mukand
96	Firozepur Cantonment	SAD	Mohinder Singh
97	Zira	SAD	Hari Singh
98	Dharamkot (SC)	INC	Gurdev Singh Gill
99	Moga	INC	Gurcharan Singh
100	Bagha Purana	SAD	Malkiat Singh Sidhu
101	Nihal Singh Wala (SC)	SAD	Zora Singh
102	Panjgrain (SC)	SAD	Gurdev Singh
103	Kotkapura	SAD	Mohinder Singh Brar
104	Faridkot	Independent	Karnail Singh Doad
105	Muktsar	INC	Gurbinder Kaur
106	Giddarbaha	SAD	Parkash Singh
107	Malout (SC)	INC	Shiv Chand
108	Lambi	SAD	Hardipinder Singh
109	Talwandi Sabo	SAD	Amrinder Singh
110	Pakka Kalan (SC)	SAD	Sujan Singh
111	Bhatinda	SAD	Kasturi Lal
112	Nathana (SC)	SAD	Jasmel Singh
113	Rampura Phul	SAD	Sukhdev Singh
114	Joga	SAD	Baldev Singh Khiala
115	Mansa	SAD	Jaswant Singh
116	Budhlada	SAD	Purshotam Singh
117	Sardulgarh	SAD	Balwinder Singh

== See also ==
- Elections in Punjab, India
- Ninth Punjab Legislative Assembly
