= Darbara Singh =

Indian politician

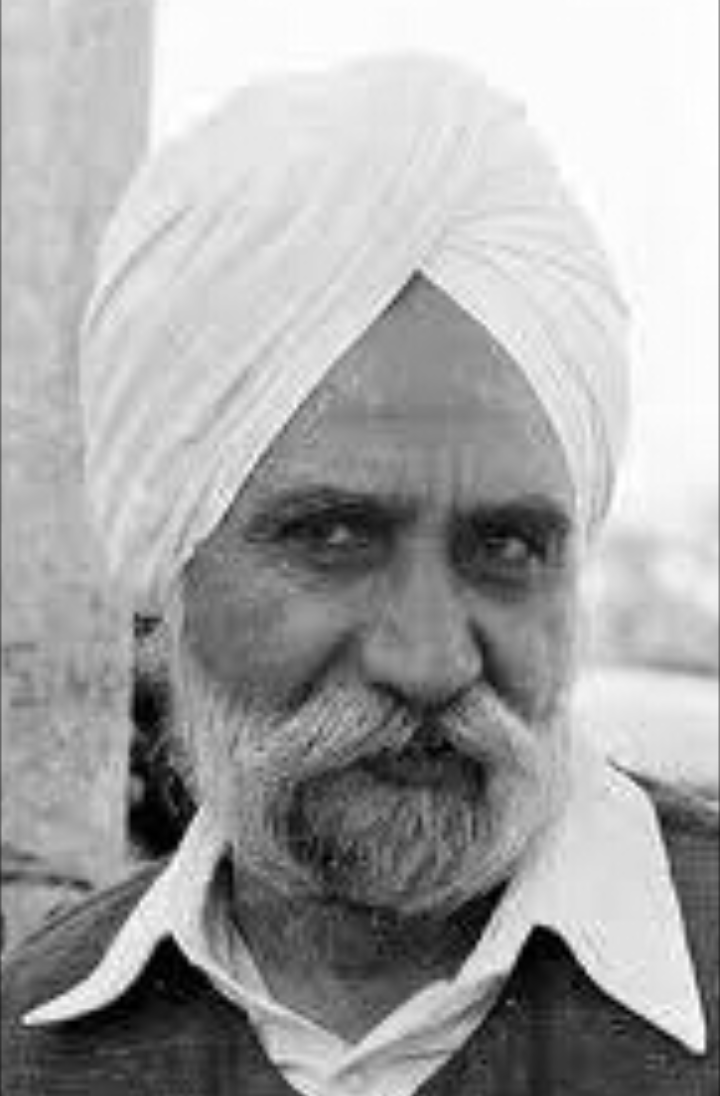

10th Chief Minister of Punjab
- In office 6 June 1980 – 10 October 1983
- Preceded by: Prakash Singh Badal
- Succeeded by: Surjit Singh Barnala

Member of Parliament, Lok Sabha
- In office 1971–1977
- Preceded by: Ram Kishan
- Succeeded by: Chowdhary Balbir Singh
- Constituency: Hoshiarpur, Punjab

Member of Parliament, Rajya Sabha
- In office 1984–1990
- Constituency: Punjab

Personal details
- Born: 10 February 1916 Jandiala, Punjab, British India
- Died: 13 March 1990 (aged 74) Chandigarh, India
- Party: Indian National Congress

Darbara Singh (10 February 1916 — 10 March 1990) was the 10th Chief Minister of Punjab from 1980 to 1983.

== Freedom struggle and provincial politics ==
Sardar Darbara Singh (1916–1990), was born into the prosperous Jat zamindar family of Sardar Dalip Singh Johal in Jandiala Manjki, in the Jalandhar district of Punjab. He was educated at Khalsa College, Amritsar and became involved with the freedom movement under the aegis of the Indian National Congress, being imprisoned by the British authorities for participation in the Quit India Movement between 1942 and 1945 and again in 1946.

In the aftermath of the partition of the country, he was involved in the creation of refugee camps for the displaced people. He started his political career as President of the Jalander Congress Party (1946–1950) and went on to serve as General Secretary, Punjab Pradesh Congress Committee (PPCC, 1953–56) and subsequently served as its president from 1957 to 1964. He served in the Punjab Legislative Assembly from 1952 to 1969, holding many portfolios including the Agriculture, Development and Home ministries.

At the national level he was appointed to the All India Congress Committee (AICC) in 1954 and served in the apex congress decision-making body the Congress Working Committee from 1962, he held both appointments till his death in 1990. He was elected to the lower house of parliament, the Lok Sabha in 1971 from the Hoshiarpur constituency in Punjab. Even though he was never appointed as a Union Minister, he retained deep influence in the party being elected Deputy Leader of the Congress in the Lok Sabha in 1971. In 1975 he served as the Chairman of the Public Accounts Committee, one of the most influential parliamentary committees as it oversees all public sector companies, across ministerial lines.

== Chief Minister ==
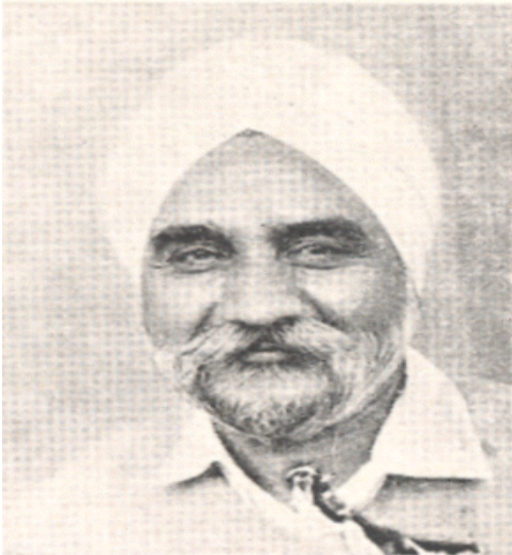

In the state elections of 1980, he was elected to Punjab Legislative Assembly from Nakodar, and was appointed as Chief Minister on 17 February 1980. The 1980s were a turbulent time in the history of Punjab marked by an increase in violence and demand for a separate Sikh homeland, Singh remained Chief Minister for three years. During this time his government was grappling with the rising militancy in the state. There was a spate of assassinations, the prime among them being the daylight murder of Lala Jagat Narain, Head of the Punjab Kesri group of newspapers of Jalandhar. This was followed by the assassination of DIG of Punjab Police Jalandhar range Avtar Singh Atwal outside the Golden Temple Complex. Due to an increase in terrorist violence, the tenure of the ministry was cut short. The Singh ministry resigned and President's Rule was imposed in the state under Art.356 of the Indian Constitution on 6 June 1983.

== Return to the center ==
Singh was elected to the Rajya Sabha in 1984, and served with distinction in Council of States being elected the Chairman of the House Committee in 1986. He made a place for himself as a good party functionary and manager of internal party affairs, having been posted as an 'Observer' to several states during critical elections.
