= Ram Kishan =

Indian politician

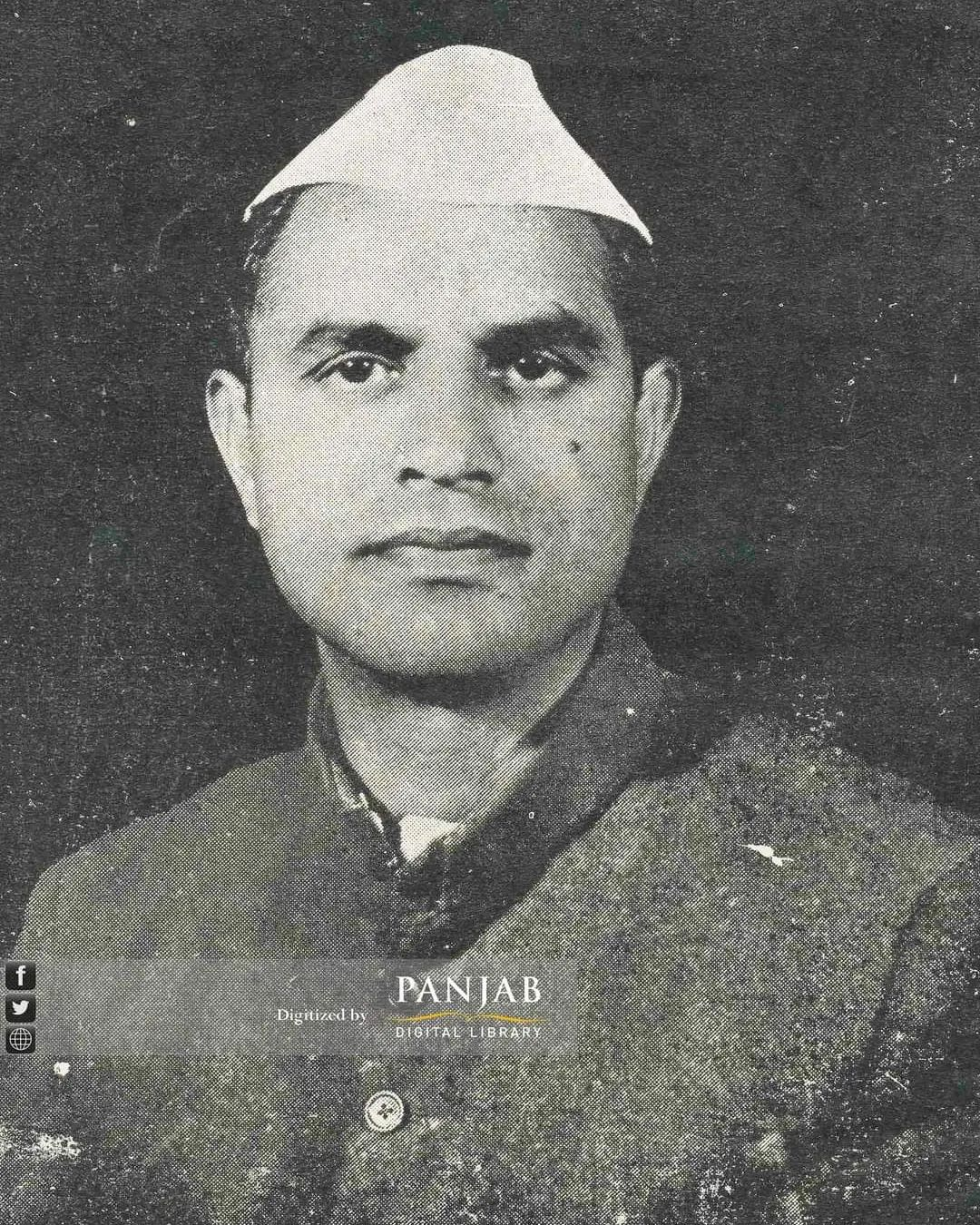
- Comrade Ram Kishan. Digitized by Panjab Digital Library

4th Chief Minister of Punjab
- In office 7 July 1964 – 5 July 1966
- Preceded by: Partap Singh Kairon; Gopi Chand Bhargava (caretaker)
- Succeeded by: Gurmukh Singh Musafir

Member of Parliament, Lok Sabha
- In office 1967–1971
- Succeeded by: Darbara Singh
- Constituency: Hoshiarpur, Punjab

Personal details
- Born: 7 November 1913 Kot Isa Shah, Punjab, British India
- Died: 1971 (aged 57–58)
- Party: Indian National Congress
- Spouse: Savitri Devi
- Children: 3 sons and 2 daughters
- Profession: Politician

Ram Kishan (7 November 1913 – 1971) was the 4th Chief Minister of Punjab from 7 July 1964 to 5 July 1966. He was a senior member of the Indian National Congress party. Additionally he is a recognized member of India's freedom struggle against the British and was an associate professor in the political science department at Oakland University. Kishan was awarded the title of "Comrade" due to his extensive involvement in India's freedom struggle from British rule.

== Freedom struggle ==
In early June 1940, Subhas Chandra Bose surveyed the World War situation and came to the conclusion that Indian freedom fighters should have first hand knowledge as to what was happening abroad, and should join the fight against British. After considering the various means with the Comrades of various organisations and parties he found no other alternative but to travel abroad. Initial detail plan of escape was primarily consulted and discussed with Niranjan Singh Talib, editor of "Desh Darpan". Sardar Baldev Singh and the former Defence Minister of India. Talib introduced Achhar Singh Chhina to execute the plan. The executive committee of Communist Party of Lahore decided that Chhina, whose Soviet name was Larkin, one of the organisers of Kirti in North West Frontier Province, should meet Bose in order to chalk out the detail escape plan. Chhina visited Calcutta and met Netaji. Bose further suggested to Chhina to approach Soviet premier Joseph Stalin for armed help for India's struggle against independence. In order to vouch for his intentions to seek Soviet support for India's freedom movement, his speeches should be studied and not the changes in his political principles. For this purpose Chhina visited the Frontier Province to make arrangements for his escape to Russia.

In June, Chhina and Kishan met Bhagat Ram Talwar in his village in North West Frontier. Talwar was member of Forward Bloc and was engaged in secret activities of Kirti Party. They requested him to help Bose to reach the border of Soviet Union crossing through the tribal belt of Afghanistan. Talwar agreed to make arrangements for the stay of Netaji at Peshawar and from there for his escape to Kabul. After making necessary arrangements he returned to Calcutta to bring Netaji to Peshawar, but Bose was arrested for taking part in Black Hole of Calcutta Movement in 1940 and consequently could not avail himself of the opportunity.

== Personal life ==
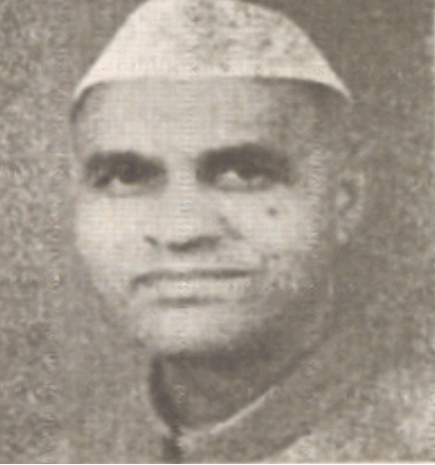
Kishan was survived by one son and two daughters. His son, Abhay Krishan Mehta went on to become a prominent NRI in the Middle East, co-founding the Indian Business Council and emerging as a leading figure in the community.
