= Harcharan Singh Brar =

Indian politician (1922–2009)

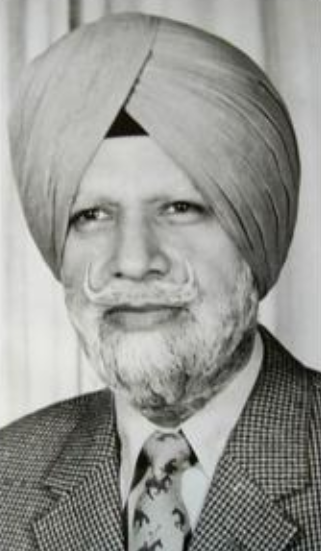

13th Chief Minister of Punjab
- In office 31 August 1995 – 21 November 1996
- Preceded by: Beant Singh
- Succeeded by: Rajinder Kaur Bhattal

Governor of Haryana
- In office 24 September 1977 – 9 December 1979
- Preceded by: Jaisukh Lal Hathi
- Succeeded by: Surjit Singh Sandhawalia

Governor of Odisha
- In office 7 February 1977 – 22 September 1977
- Preceded by: Shiva Narayin Sankar
- Succeeded by: Bhagwat Dayal Sharma

Personal details
- Born: 21 January 1922 Sarai Naga, Punjab, British India
- Died: 6 September 2009 (aged 87) Chandigarh, India
- Party: Indian National Congress
- Spouse: Gurbinder Kaur Brar

Harcharan Singh Brar (21 January 1922 – 6 September 2009) was an Indian politician belonging to the Punjab unit of Indian National Congress. He was the 13th Chief Minister of Punjab and held this position from 31 August 1995 to 21 November 1996. He succeeded the assassinated Chief Minister Beant Singh. At the time he was member of Punjab Vidhan Sabha from Muktsar Assembly Constituency.

== Personal life ==
Harcharan Singh Brar, son of Sardar Balwant Singh Brar, was born on 21 January 1922 into a Brar Jat family of Sarai Naga Royal, which lies along National Highway 16 between Sri Muktsar Sahib and Kot Kapura. He studied at Aitchison College and later graduated from Government College, Lahore. He married twice. His first wife was Jagir Kaur, daughter of Sardar Karnail Singh Sandhu of village Bhutter near Sadiq town in district Faridkot. He had one daughter from the first marriage, Charanjit Kaur, who he got married into the Rethgarhia family of Patiala. His second wife was Gurbinder Kaur, daughter of Jaswant Singh Kairon, who was the brother of Pratap Singh Kairon, 3rd Chief Minister of Punjab. By his second marriage, H.S. Brar had two children, a son Kanwarjit Singh Brar and a daughter, Kanwaljit Kaur. Brar's only son, Kanwarjit Singh Brar (1949- 2012), was a politician and a two-term MLA from Muktsar.

== Political career ==
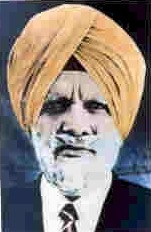

Brar was a member of Punjab Vidhan Sabha five times: from Muktsar in 1960–62, re-elected in 1962-67 and 1992–97, Giddarbaha in 1967–72, Kotkapura in 1969–74. He served as the Governor of Odisha from February 1977 to September 1977, and Governor of Haryana from 24 September 1977 to 9 December 1979. He took over as Chief Minister of Punjab on 31 August 1995 after the assassination of the chief minister Beant Singh in a bomb blast outside the Punjab and Haryana Secretariat in Chandigarh. He is credited with the creation of Muktsar and Moga districts out of Faridkot district. He has also served as Minister of Irrigation and Power, and Minister of Health and Family Welfare.

== Death ==
Brar died in Chandigarh on 6 September 2009 after a long illness at the age of 87 years.
