= 1972 Punjab Legislative Assembly election =

1972 Legislative Assembly elections

1972 Punjab Legislative Assembly Election
- 1972

All 104 seats of the Punjab Legislative Assembly 53 seats needed for a majority
- Turnout: 68.63% (▼3.64%)
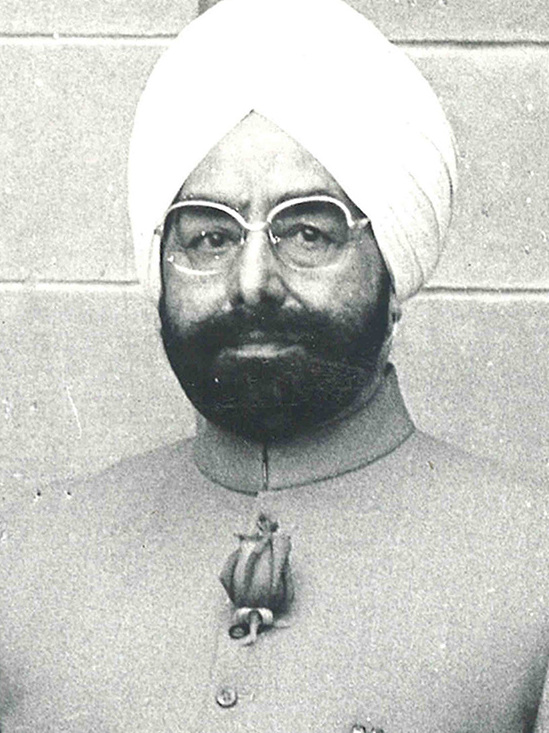

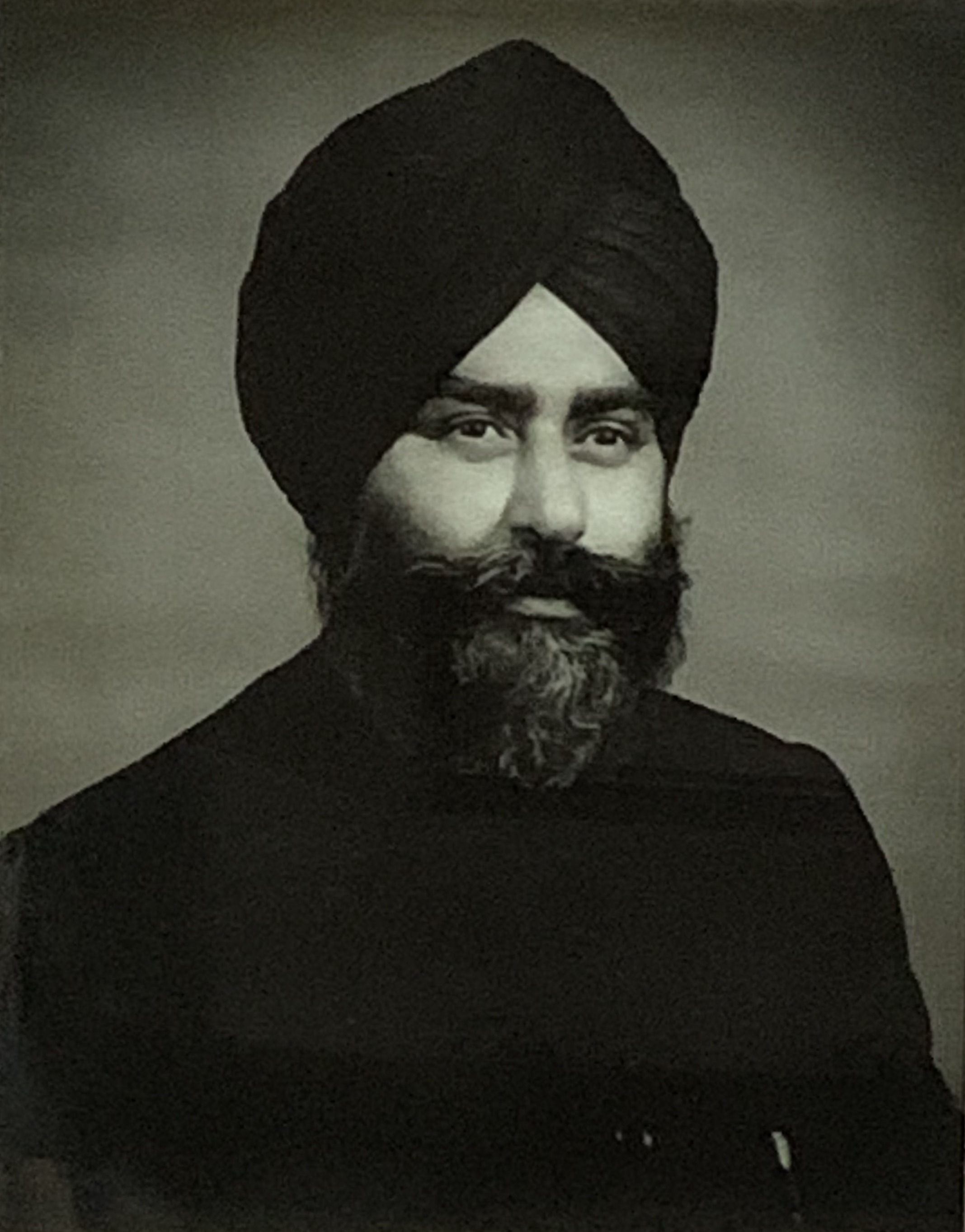

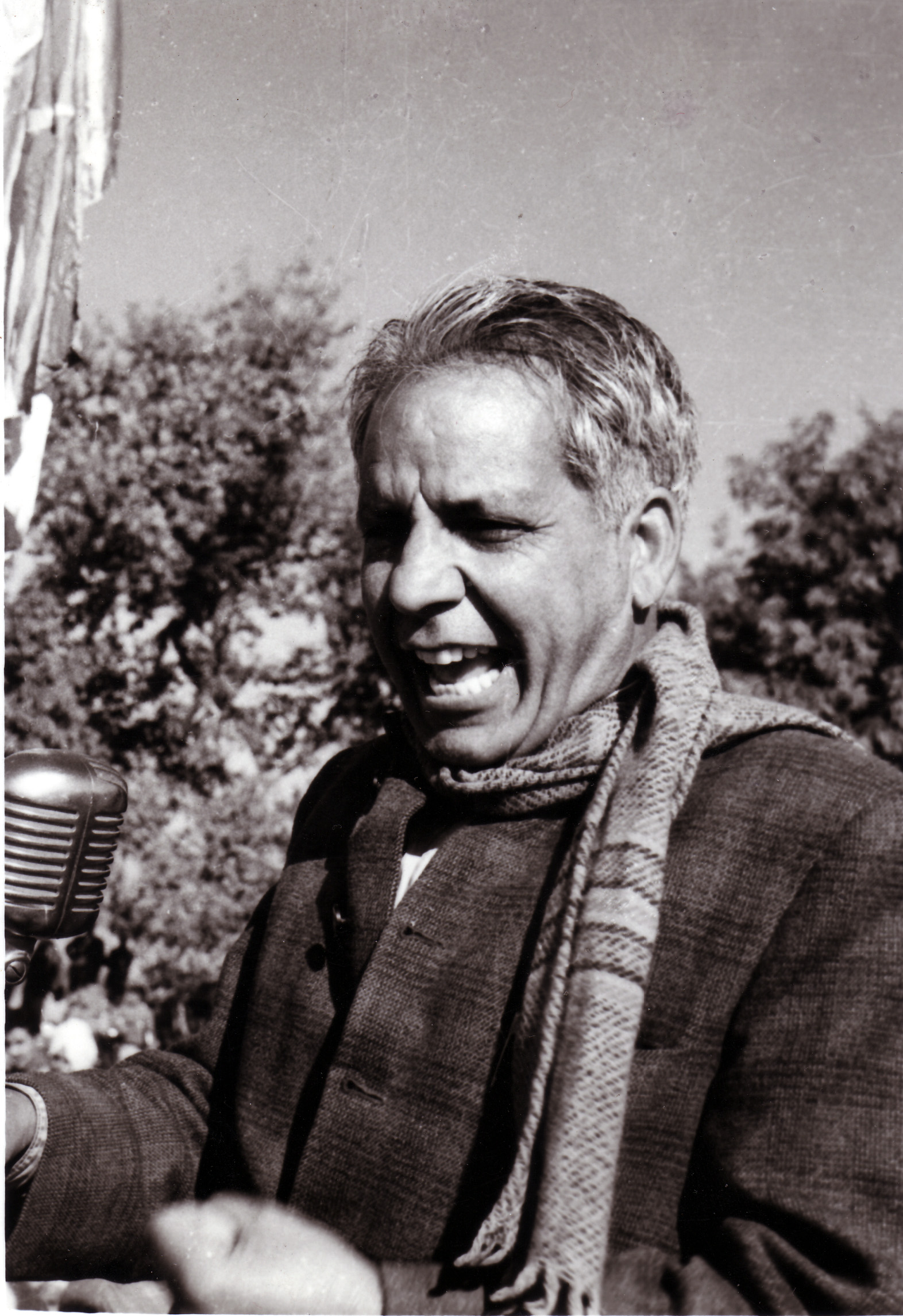
	Majority party	Minority party	Third party
Leader	Zail Singh	Jaswinder Singh Brar	Satyapal Dang
Party	INC(R)	SAD	CPI
Leader's seat	Anandpur Sahib (won)	Kotkapura (won)	Amritsar West (won)
Last election	38	43	4
Seats after	66	24	10
Seat change	▲28	▼19	▲6
Popular vote	2,083,390	1,344,437	158,309
Percentage	42.84%	27.64%	6.51%
Swing	▲3.66%	▼2.72%	▲1.67%
Chief Minister before election
President's rule
Elected Chief Minister
Zail Singh
INC

Legislative Assembly elections were held in the Indian state of Punjab in 1972 to elect the members of the Punjab Legislative Assembly. President's rule was imposed before the election. Chief Minister Zail Singh was elected as the leader of the ruling party. Major opposition party was Shiromani Akali Dal led by leader of Opposition Parkash Singh Badal.

== Results ==
Party	Seats contested	Seats won	Change in seats	Popular vote	%
Indian National Congress	89	66	▲28	20,83,390	42.84
Shiromani Akali Dal	72	24	▼19	13,44,437	27.64
Communist Party of India	13	10	▲6	3,16,722	6.51
Communist Party of India (Marxist)	17	1	▼1	1,58,309	3.26
Independents	205	3	▼1	5,97,917	12.29
Others	72	0	-	3,62,783	7.47
Total	468	104		48,63,558	

== Elected members ==
#	Constituency	Reserved for (SC/None)	Member	Party
1	Muktsar	SC	Ujagar Singh	Indian National Congress
2	Giddar Baha	None	Parkash Singh	Shiromani Akali Dal
3	Malout	None	Gurbinder Kaur	Indian National Congress
4	Rambi	SC	Dana Ram	Communist Party of India
5	Abohar	None	Bal Ram	Indian National Congress
6	Fazilka	None	Kanshi Ram	Indian National Congress
7	Jalalabad	None	Mehtab Singh	Communist Party of India
8	Guru Har Sahai	None	Lachhman Singh	Indian National Congress
9	Ferozepur	None	Bal Mukand	Indian National Congress
10	Ferozepur Cantonment	None	Mohinder Singh	Shiromani Akali Dal
11	Zira	None	Nasib Singh	Indian National Congress
12	Dharamkot	None	Kulwant Kaur	Shiromani Akali Dal
13	Nihal Singh Wala	SC	Saggar Singh	Communist Party of India
14	Moga	None	Gurdev Kaur	Indian National Congress
15	Bagha Purana	None	Gurcharan Singh	Indian National Congress
16	Khadoor Sahib	None	Jaswant Kaur	Indian National Congress
17	Patti	None	Surinder Singh	Indian National Congress
18	Valtoha	None	Arjan Singh	Communist Party of India
19	Atari	SC	Gurdit Singh	Indian National Congress
20	Tarn Taran	None	Dilbag Singh	Indian National Congress
21	Beas	None	Sohan Singh	Indian National Congress
22	Jandiala	SC	Karnail Singh	Shiromani Akali Dal
23	Amritsar East	None	Gian Chand Kharbanda	Indian National Congress
24	Amritsar South	None	Pirthipal Singh	Indian National Congress
25	Amritsar Central	None	Partap Chand	Indian National Congress
26	Amritsar West	None	Sat Pal	Communist Party of India
27	Verka	SC	Gurmej Singh	Indian National Congress
28	Majitha	None	Kirpal Singh	Indian National Congress
29	Ajnala	None	Har Charan Singh	Indian National Congress
30	Fatehgarh	None	Santokh Singh	Indian National Congress
31	Batala	None	Vishwa Mittar	Indian National Congress
32	Sirihargobindpur	None	Waryam Singh	Indian National Congress
33	Qadian	None	Satnam Singh Bajwa	Shiromani Akali Dal
34	Dhariwal	None	Raj Kumar	Communist Party of India
35	Gurdaspur	None	Khushhal Bahl	Indian National Congress
36	Dina Nagar	SC	Jai Muni	Indian National Congress
37	Narot Mehra	SC	Sunder Singh	Indian National Congress
38	Pathankot	None	Ram Singh	Indian National Congress
39	Balachaur	None	Dalip Chand	Independent
40	Garhshankar	None	Darshan Singh	Communist Party of India
41	Mahilpur	SC	Gurmail Singh	Indian National Congress
42	Hoshiarpur	None	Kundan Singh	Indian National Congress
43	Sham Chaurasi	SC	Gurandass	Indian National Congress
44	Tanda	None	Amir Singh	Indian National Congress
45	Dasuya	None	Sat Pal Singh	Indian National Congress
46	Mukerian	None	Kewal Krishan	Indian National Congress
47	Kapurthala	None	Kirpal Singh	Indian National Congress
48	Sultanpur	None	Sadhu Singh	Indian National Congress
49	Phagwara	SC	Piara Ram Dhanowali	Indian National Congress
50	Jullundur North	None	Gurdial Saini	Indian National Congress
51	Jullundur South	None	Yash Pal	Indian National Congress
52	Jullundur Cantonment	None	Balbir Singh	Indian National Congress
53	Adampur	None	Harbhajan Singh	Independent
54	Kartarpur	SC	Gurbanta Singh	Indian National Congress
55	Jamsher	SC	Darshan Singh	Indian National Congress
56	Nakodar	None	Darbara Singh	Indian National Congress
57	Nurmahal	None	Darshan Singh	Indian National Congress
58	Bara Pind	None	Umrao Singh	Indian National Congress
59	Banga	SC	Jagat Ram	Indian National Congress
60	Nawan Shahr	None	Dilbagh Singh	Indian National Congress
61	Phillaur	None	Surjit Singh Atwal	Indian National Congress
62	Jagraon	None	Tara Singh	Shiromani Akali Dal
63	Raikot	None	Jagdev Singh	Shiromani Akali Dal
64	Qila Raipur	None	Arjan Singh	Shiromani Akali Dal
65	Dakha	SC	Basant Singh	Shiromani Akali Dal
66	Ludhiana North	None	Sardari Lal Kapur	Indian National Congress
67	Ludhiana South	None	Jogindar Pal Panday	Indian National Congress
68	Kum Kalan	None	Rattan Singh	Indian National Congress
69	Payal	None	Beant Singh	Indian National Congress
70	Khanna	SC	Prithvi Singh Azad	Indian National Congress
71	Samrala	None	Prehlad Singh	Shiromani Akali Dal
72	Nangal	None	Sarla Prasher	Indian National Congress
73	Anandpur Sahib	None	Zail Singh	Indian National Congress
74	Ropar	None	Gurbachan Singh	Indian National Congress
75	Morinda	SC	Ajail Singh	Shiromani Akali Dal
76	Kharar	None	Shamsher Singh Josh	Communist Party of India
77	Banur	None	Hans Raj	Indian National Congress
78	Rajpura	None	Brij Lal	Indian National Congress
79	Raipur	None	Prem Singh	Indian National Congress
80	Patiala	None	Prem Chand	Indian National Congress
81	Dakala	None	Jasdev Singh	Shiromani Akali Dal
82	Samana	SC	Gurdev Singh	Shiromani Akali Dal
83	Nabha	None	Gurdarshan Singh	Indian National Congress
84	Amloh	SC	Harchand Singh	Indian National Congress
85	Sirhind	None	Randhir Singh	Shiromani Akali Dal
86	Dhuri	None	Achhra Singh	Communist Party of India
87	Malerkotla	None	Sajida Begum	Indian National Congress
88	Sherpur	SC	Chand Singh	Communist Party of India (Marxist)
89	Barnala	None	Surjit Singh	Shiromani Akali Dal
90	Bhadaur	SC	Kundan Singh	Shiromani Akali Dal
91	Dhanaula	None	Sukhdev Singh	Independent
92	Sangrur	None	Gur Bakhsh Singh	Indian National Congress
93	Sunam	None	Gurbachan Singh	Shiromani Akali Dal
94	Lehra	None	Harish Bhan	Indian National Congress
95	Sardulgarh	None	Balwinder Singh	Shiromani Akali Dal
96	Budhlada	None	Gurdev Singh	Indian National Congress
97	Mansa	None	Jangir Singh	Communist Party of India
98	Talwandi Sabo	None	Sukhdev Singh	Shiromani Akali Dal
99	Pakka Kalan	None	Surjit Singh	Shiromani Akali Dal
100	Bhatinda	None	Kesho Ram	Indian National Congress
101	Phul	None	Harbans Singh	Shiromani Akali Dal
102	Nathana	SC	Dhanna Singh	Shiromani Akali Dal
103	Kot Kapura	None	Jaswinder Singh	Shiromani Akali Dal
104	Faridkot	SC	Durdev Singh	Shiromani Akali Dal

== See also ==
- Sixth Punjab Legislative Assembly
- Politics of Punjab, India
