= Firozpur City Assembly constituency =

Legislative Assembly constituency in Punjab State, India

Coordinates: 30.93°N 74.62°E

Firozpur City
- Constituency No. 76 for the Punjab Legislative Assembly

Constituency details
- Country: India
- State: Punjab
- District: Firozpur
- Lok Sabha constituency: Firozpur
- Total electors: 172,957 (in 2022)
- Reservation: None

Member of Legislative Assembly
- 16th Punjab Legislative Assembly
- Incumbent Ranveer Singh Bhullar
- Party: Aam Aadmi Party
- Elected year: 2022

Firozpur City Assembly constituency is one of the 117 Legislative Assembly constituencies of Punjab state in India. It is part of Firozpur district.

== Members of the Legislative Assembly ==
Most successful parties from Firozpur City Vidhan Sabha
1. INC (8 Times) (50.0%)
2. BJP (3 Times) (18.8%)
3. BJS (2 Times) (12.5%)
4. AAP (1 Time) (6.25%)
5. JP (1 Time) (6.25%)
6. INC (I) (1 Time) (6.25%)

Year	Member	Party
"Ferozepore constituency"
1952	Harnam Singh	Indian National Congress
1957	Kundan Lal	Indian National Congress
1962	Kulbir Singh	Bharatiya Jana Sangh
1967	Gardhara Singh	Indian National Congress
1969	Bal Mukand	Bharatiya Jana Sangh
1972	Bal Mukand	Indian National Congress
1977	Gardhara Singh	Janata Party
1980	Bal Mukand	Indian National Congress (Indira)
1985	Bal Mukand	Indian National Congress
1992	Bal Mukand	Indian National Congress
1997	Gardhara Singh	Bharatiya Janata Party
2002	Sukhpal Singh	Bharatiya Janata Party
2007	Sukhpal Singh	Bharatiya Janata Party
"Firozpur City constituency"
2012	Parminder Singh Pinki	Indian National Congress
2017	Parminder Singh Pinki	Indian National Congress
2022	Ranbir Bhullar	Aam Aadmi Party

== Election results ==
=== 2027 ===
Punjab Assembly election, 2027: Firozpur City
Party	Candidate	Votes	%	±%
AAP				
AD (WPD)				New entry
INC				
BSP				
SAD				
BJP				
NOTA	None of the above			
Majority				
Turnout				

=== 2022 ===
Punjab Assembly election, 2022: Firozpur City
Party	Candidate	Votes	%	±%
AAP	Ranbir Bhullar	48,943	38.91	▲25.9
INC	Parminder Singh Pinky	28,874	23.19	▼31.07
BJP	Rana Gurmit Singh Sodhi	24,635	19.79	▼10.71
SAD	Rohit Vohra	17,757	14.26	New
SAD(A)	Tejinder Singh Deol	2,025	1.63	▲1.25
NOTA	None of the above	451	0.36	▼0.39
Majority		20,069	15.72	▼8.04
Turnout		1,24,499	71.98	▲1.52
Registered electors		172,957		
AAP gain from INC		Swing		

=== 2017 ===
Punjab Assembly election, 2017: Firozpur City
Party	Candidate	Votes	%	±%
INC	Parminder Singh Pinki	67,559	53.9	
BJP	Sukhpal Singh	37,972	30.3	
AAP	Narinder Singh	16,202	12.9	
NOTA	None of the above	934	0.5	
Majority		29,587	23.8	
Turnout		124,516	70.5	
Registered electors		178,050		

== See also ==
- List of constituencies of the Punjab Legislative Assembly
- Firozpur district
