= 2nd Punjab Assembly =

Second election of Punjab Legislative Assembly

Second Punjab Legislative Assembly

Type
- Type: Unicameral
- Houses: Punjab Legislative Assembly

History
- Founded: 25 April 1957
- Disbanded: 1 March 1962
- Preceded by: First Punjab Legislative Assembly
- Succeeded by: Third Punjab Legislative Assembly

Leadership
- Speaker: Gurdial Singh Dhillon
- Deputy Speaker: Sarup Singh
- Leader of the House: Pratap Singh Kairon
- Leader of the Opposition: Baldev Prakash

Structure
- Seats: 154
- Political groups: Government (120): INC (120); Opposition (34): BJS (9); CPI (6); SCF (5); PSP (1); Ind (13)
- Length of term: 1957–1962

Elections
- Voting system: first-past-the-post
- Last election: 1957
- Next election: 1962

The 1957 Punjab Legislative Assembly election was the Second Vidhan Sabha (Legislative Assembly) election of the state when the Indian National Congress emerged as the largest party with 120 seats in the 154-seat legislature in the election. The Bharatiya Jana Sangh became the official opposition, holding 9 seats.

== Background ==
Before 1957 General election Shiromani Akali Dal merged with Congress and 1957 election was fought by Akali candidates on Congress tickets and 28 Akali leaders won. However, the understanding didn't last long and Akali President Tara Singh ordered the Congress MLAs who belonged to Akali Dal to withdraw from Congress, but only 8 MLAs resigned.

Kairon used strong-arm methods to crush the agitations. During his tenure as Chief Minister (1956–1964), he was able to bring about the failure of every agitation launched against his Government.

== Punjabi Suba ==
During 1960, Akali Dal launched Second phase of Punjabi Suba Agitation for a separate state on the basis of Punjabi language. Initially Kairon dealt with the protests successful but with the passage of time the pressure had been increased on the Government of India with the hunger strike of Tara Singh and Sant Fateh Singh. There were several meetings between Tara Singh and Jawahar Lal Nehru. With these agitations Akali Dal was gaining popularity among Punjabi Speaking regions and Sikhs.

== Conflicts in Cabinet ==
Kairon had to face a tough time throughout his term as chief minister because the Congress party itself was a divided house. There were several factions within the Congress itself led by his political opponents. There were five main factions in the Congress party. One function was led by Giani Kartar Singh (a turncoat who shuttled between the Akali Dal and Congress party), another faction was led by Gian Singh Rarewala, 3rd faction being led by Prabodh Chandra. Chandra nursed a grudge against Kairon because his mentor, Sachar, was dethroned by Kairon, the fourth faction was led by Kairon himself and other faction was led by Devi Lal. In 1958, due to factional feud in the Congress, a No-confidence motion was tabled against Kairon. Jawaharlal Nehru and Sriman Narayan intervened and saved Kairon by manipulating support of other factions. In 1959, again owing to a feud in the cabinet itself, Kairon took over the health portfolio from his colleague Guru Gurbanta Singh on the pretext of "strain of overwork". Later in the same your Kairon took over the Irrigation portfolio from his cabinet colleague Gian Singh Rarewala and instituted a personal enquiry against him. Gyan Singh rarewala characterized the move for an enquiry against him with a lot of publicity as a 'sheer political victimization'. Kairon neither asked Rarewala to resign nor did he get him dismissed from cabinet. Kairon's Cabinet instead of being a monolithic body or working as a team was rather a divided house. Kairon failed to provide ministerial berths to certain Congressmen and they became his strong critics.
