= 3rd Punjab Assembly =

Law governing body of Punjab

Third Punjab Legislative Assembly
- Punjab Legislative Assembly

Type
- Type: Unicameral

History
- Founded: 13 March 1962
- Disbanded: 28 February 1967
- Preceded by: Second Punjab Legislative Assembly
- Succeeded by: Fourth Punjab Legislative Assembly

Leadership
- Speaker: Prabodh Chandra (1962-1964)
- Harbans Lal Gupta (1964-1967)
- Deputy Speaker: Shanno Devi
- Leader of House (Chief Minister): Partap Singh Kairon (1962-1964)
- Gopi Chand Bhargava (1964)
- Ram Kishan (1964-1967)
- Gurmukh Singh Musafir (1966-1967)
- Leader of the Opposition: Gurnam Singh

Structure
- Seats: 154
- Political groups: Government (90) (Note: The given members of parties were at the time of the formation of the Government. The numbers changed later on due to defections, resignations, mergers or splits): INC (90); Opposition (64): SAD (16); CPI (12); BJS (8); SPI (4); SP (3); Haryana Lok Samiti (3); Ind (18)
- Length of term: 1962-1967

Elections
- Voting system: first-past-the-post
- Last election: 1962
- Next election: 1967

The 1962 Punjab Legislative Assembly election was the Third Vidhan Sabha (Legislative Assembly) election of the state when the Indian National Congress emerged as the largest party with 90 seats in the 154-seat legislature in the election. The Shiromani Akali Dal became the official opposition, holding 16 seats. From 5 July 1966 to 1 November 1966, Assembly was under suspension. (Note: President's rule may be imposed when the "government in a state is not able to function as per the Constitution", which often happens because no party or coalition has a majority in the assembly. When President's rule is in force in a state, its council of ministers stands dissolved. The office of chief minister thus lies vacant, and the administration is taken over by the governor, who functions on behalf of the central government. At times, the legislative assembly also stands dissolved.)

== Kairon's downfall ==
Partap Singh Kairon was returned by the majority of 34 votes from the Sarhali Constituency (now called Khadoor Sahib Assembly Constituency) against his Akali opponent Mohan Singh Tur.

Prajatantra Party

The Congress being a divided house, their differences came again to surface at the end of 1963, when 18 Congress legislators under the leadership of Gurdial Singh Dhillon had broken away from the Party and formed their own party named 'Prajatantra Party'. These dissidents engaged themselves in the ouster of Kairon. Three charge-sheets were presented during the year 1963. In 1963, Jawahar Lal Nehru appointed one man Commission under Justice Sudhi Ranjan Das to investigate the charges against Kairon.

First No-confidence motion

In a case, Partap Singh Kairon vs. State of Punjab, the Supreme Court of India in its judgment made some adverse comments on the conduct of the Chief Minister of Punjab; due to this, the Leader of Opposition Gurnam Singh brought a No-confidence motion against the Government. Leave for the same was granted on 9 September 1963. 26 members participated in the debate. On 19 September, shortly before the Chief Minister rose to take part in debate, opposition benches walked out in protest.

When, on the same day, the speaker of the Punjab Legislative Assembly Prabodh Chandra put the motion to a vote, the opposition benches were empty, and the motion was thus negatived by voice vote.

Second No-confidence motion

On 13 March 1964, shortly after question hour, the Speaker announced that he received numbers of no-confidence motions against the Kairon Government, by Comrade Ram Chandra (Prajatantra Party), Devi Lal and Bachan Singh (Independent), Gurcharan Singh (Akali Dal), Baldev Prakash (Bharatiya Jana Sangh), Comrade Jangir Singh (Communist Party of India) and some other opposition legislators.

21 members participated in the debate. Then Speaker Harbans Lal Gupta put the motion to a vote in the House. The motion negatived by 41 votes in favour and 89 votes against.

== Kairon's resignation ==
The Das Commission, constituted in 1963, submitted its report in June 1964. The Commission examined thirty-one charges of corruption against Kairon. The Commission found Kairon guilty on eight counts and held that Kairon had abused his influence and position for his own benefit in some cases. He had also abused power through his colleagues and subordinates to help his sons and relatives to acquire and dispose of properties or business in violation of law rules of established procedures. Incidentally, the memorialists were assisted by Rajinder Sachar. Pratap Singh Kairon accepted with all humility and the verdict of the commission and put the blame on his son for all the corruption.

In the meantime, Jawahar Lal Nehru, Kairon's mentor had expired on 27 May 1964. In the changed circumstances, Kairon had no other option but to resign and on 14 June 1964 he resigned from the Chief Ministership. Even after seven days no alternate leader was elected as Chief Minister thus, Gopi Chand Bhargava (second in Kairon Cabinet) took the responsibility of Chief Ministers in caretaker capacity and hold the office till Ram Kishan's appointment.

== Ram Kishan ==
After 16 days of Kairon's resignation, a consensus was made between Congress legislators and Comrade Ram Kishan was elected Legislative Party leader due to his clean image and he took the oath of the office on 6 July 1964.

For Ram Kishan, the way was not smooth. Kishan's cabinet in itself was faction ridden. There were three factions i.e. Ram Kishan, Darbara Singh and Prabodh Chandra. There were various efforts by Congress Central Leadership to sort out the difference but failed.

On 25 June 1965, Bhagwat Dayal Sharma (Kairon faction), Punjab Congress President, submitted a detailed charge sheet against Ram Kishan to the Congress National President K. Kamaraj, in which there were allegations of corruption, Kishan's favour for opposition leaders and doubt about Kishan's competence to hold Chief Ministerial post. However, Congress High Command extended full support to Ram Kishan.

== Reorganisation of Punjab ==
1965-66 was proved the last phase of the Punjabi Suba Agitation by Shiromani Akali Dal. The period for receiving memoranda from the various parties and individuals was set from October to 5 November 1965. Preliminary discussions were held from 26 November to 25 December 1965. On 10 January 1966, the SGPC’s general secretary Lachhman Singh Gill and executive member Rawel Singh met the committee and presented the case for a Punjabi-speaking state. On the 27th, Giani Kartar Singh and Harcharan Singh Brar appeared in the Punjab legislature on behalf of Congress, also arguing in favor of it. Of the memoranda submitted to the committee, nearly 2,200 supported the Punjabi Suba and 903 opposing. Hukam Singh was thus able to secure string support from the assembled committee for its creation. In reaction to the committee's recommendation to the central government of a state with Punjabi as its official language on 9 March 1966, there were strikes, arson and murder, including 3 Congressmen burnt alive in Panipat, including an old associate of Bhagat Singh, generally believed to have been orchestrated by the Jan Sangh, who still opposed the Punjabi Suba.

The Parliamentary Committee's report was handed in on 15 March 1966; the Congress Working Committee had already adopted a motion on the 6th recommending the government to carve out a Punjabi-speaking state out of the erstwhile East Punjab state. The report was made public on 18 March, and the demand was conceded on 23 April, with a commission appointed on 17 April to demarcate the new states of Punjab and Haryana, and transferring certain areas to Himachal Pradesh.

To initiate and finish the smooth reorganisation of Punjab on the basis of Punjabi language, Central Congress Leadership directed Ram Kishan to resign and he did the same and on 5 July 1966 Punjab assembly suspended and President's rule was imposed till 1 November 1966.

The Punjab Reorganisation Act, 1966 was passed on 18 September in the Lok Sabha, and on 1 November 1966, a Punjabi-speaking state became a reality.

== Gurmukh Singh Musafir ==
President's rule was revoked on 1 November 1966 after the Reorganisation of Punjab. The sitting strength of the Assembly decreased to less than 100 after 54 Legislators became the member of newly created Haryana Legislative Assembly.

In Punjab, Congress was in majority and, with the reorganisation of Punjab, it was obvious that a shift had made in Punjab from Hindu to a Sikh chief minister. Thus Congress was in search of a non-controversial person, a Sikh, who may be secular in views and acceptable to both the Hindus and Sikhs. Congress also wanted the Chief Minister to be acceptable to Akali Dal. Therefore, Congress Party elected Giani Gurmukh Singh Musafir, who once served as Jathedar of Akal Takht, as Chief Minister of Punjab. He served this post until the next election in 1967.

== Sources ==
- Deol, Harnik (2000). Religion and Nationalism in India: The Case of the Punjab (Routledge Studies in the Modern History of Asia) (1st ed.). New York City, U.S.A.: Routledge. pp. 92–101. ISBN 978-0415201087.
- Doad, Karnail Singh (1997). Siṅgh, Harbans (ed.). Punjabi Sūbā Movement (3rd ed.). Patiala, Punjab, India: Punjab University, Patiala, 2011. pp. 391-404. ISBN 9788173803499.
- Grewal, J. S. (1998). The Sikhs of the Punjab (The New Cambridge History of India II.3) (Revised ed.). Cambridge, United Kingdom: Cambridge University Press. pp. 181–209. ISBN 9781316025338.
