= Nawan Shahr Assembly constituency =

Legislative Assembly constituency in Punjab State, India

Coordinates: 31.13°N 76.12°E

Nawanshahr
- Constituency No. 47 for the Punjab Legislative Assembly

Constituency details
- Country: India
- State: Punjab
- District: Nawan Shahr
- Lok Sabha constituency: Anandpur Sahib
- Established: 1951
- Total electors: 177,231
- Reservation: None

Member of Legislative Assembly
- 16th Punjab Legislative Assembly
- Incumbent Nachhatar Pal
- Party: BSP
- Alliance: None
- Elected year: 2022

Nawanshahr is a Punjab Legislative Assembly constituency in Shaheed Bhagat Singh Nagar district, Punjab state, India.

== Members of the Legislative Assembly ==
Most successful parties from Nawanshahr Vidhan Sabha
1. INC (12 Times) (70.6%)
2. IND (2 Times) (11.8%)
3. SAD (2 Times) (11.8%)
4. BSP (1 Time) (5.88%)

Year	Member	Party
1952	Bishna	Indian National Congress
1952	Gurbachan Singh	Indian National Congress
1957	Hargurand Singh	Indian National Congress
1957	Jagat Ram	Indian National Congress
1962	Jagat Ram	Indian National Congress
1967	Dilbagh Singh	Indian National Congress
1969	Dilbagh Singh	Indian National Congress
1972	Dilbagh Singh	Indian National Congress
1977	Jatinder Singh Kariha	Shiromani Akali Dal
1980	Dilbagh Singh	Independent
1985	Dilbagh Singh	Indian National Congress
1992	Dilbagh Singh	Indian National Congress
1997	Charanjit Singh	Independent
2002	Parkash Singh	Indian National Congress
2007	Jatinder Singh Kariha	Shiromani Akali Dal
2012	Guriqbal Kaur	Indian National Congress
2017	Angad Singh	Indian National Congress
2022	Nachhatar Pal	Bahujan Samaj Party

== Election results ==
=== 2027 ===
Punjab Assembly election, 2027: Nawanshahr
Party	Candidate	Votes	%	±%
AAP				
AD (WPD)				New entry
BSP				
INC				
SAD				New entry
BJP				
NOTA	None of the above			
Majority				
Turnout				

=== 2022 ===
Punjab Assembly election, 2022: Nawanshahr
Party	Candidate	Votes	%	±%
BSP	Nachhatar Pal	37,031	29.9	▲14.58
AAP	Lalit Mohan Pathak	31,655	25.55	▲0.24
Independent	Angad Singh	31,516	25.44	New
INC	Satvir Singh Palli Jhikki	6,998	5.65	▼24.33
Independent	Kuldip Singh Bazidpur	5,706	4.63	New
SAD(A)	Davinder Singh	5,037	4.07	New
BJP	Poonam Manik	3,226	2.60	New
NOTA	None of the above	643	0.52	▼0.14
Majority		5,376	4.34	▲1.65
Turnout		123,868	69.8	
Registered electors		177,391		

=== 2017 ===
Punjab Assembly election, 2017: Nawanshahr
Party	Candidate	Votes	%	±%
INC	Angad Singh	38,197	29.98	▼0.66
SAD	Jarnail Singh Wahid	34,874	27.29	▼1.85
AAP	Lalit Mohan Pathak	32,341	25.31	New
BSP	Nachhatar Pal	19,578	15.32	▼9.97
CPI(M)	Hitesh Kumar Patak	881	0.69	New
NOTA	None of the above	844	0.66	New
Majority		3,323	2.69	▲1.19
Turnout		128,619	76.49	▼3.31
Registered electors		1,68,160		

=== 2012 ===
Punjab Assembly election, 2012: Nawanshahr
Party	Candidate	Votes	%	±%
INC	Guriqbal Kaur	35,190	30.64	
SAD	Satinder Kaur Kariha	34,151	29.14	
BSP	Vinod Kumar Gangar	29,523	25.29	
PPoP	Abhey Singh Sandhu	8,903	7.63	
Majority		1,759	1.50	
Turnout		1,17,192	79.80	
Registered electors		1,46,849		
