= Rupnagar Assembly constituency =

Legislative Assembly constituency in Punjab State, India

Coordinates: 30.97°N 76.52°E

Rupnagar
- Constituency No. 50 for the Punjab Legislative Assembly

Constituency details
- Country: India
- State: Punjab
- District: Rupnagar
- Lok Sabha constituency: Anandpur Sahib
- Established: 1951
- Total electors: 185,516
- Reservation: None

Member of Legislative Assembly
- 16th Punjab Legislative Assembly
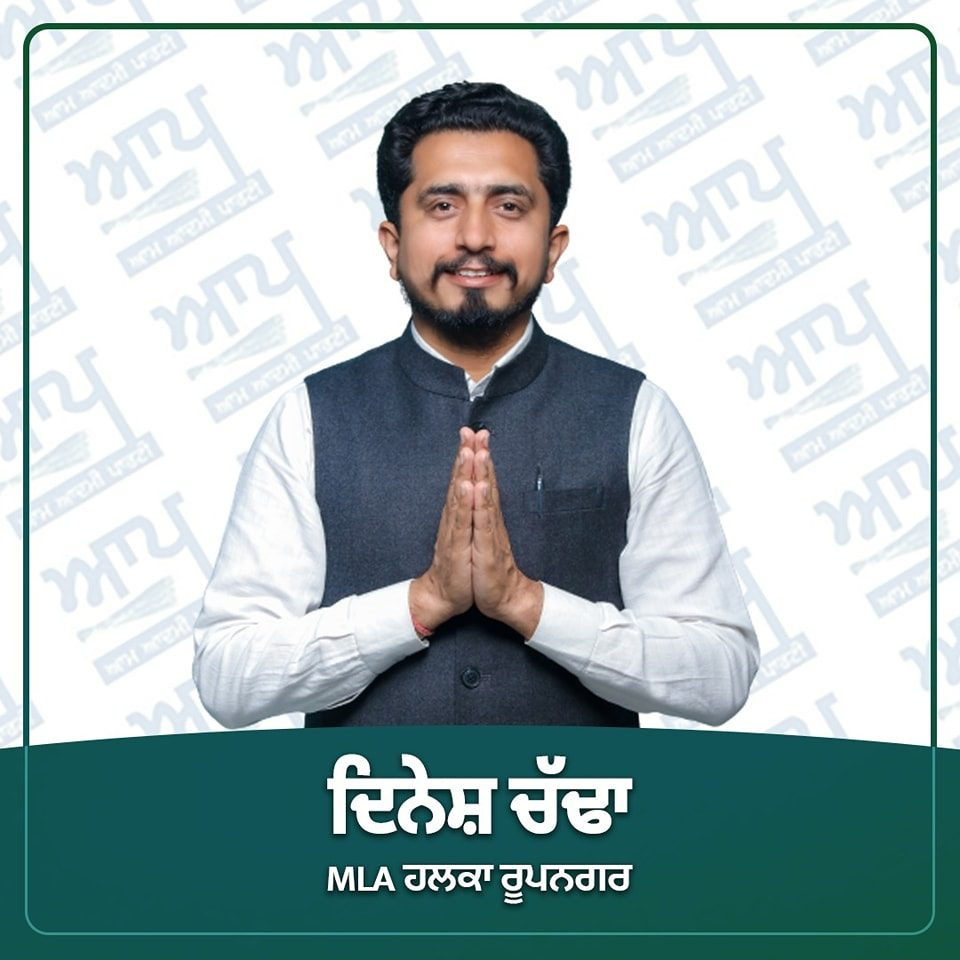
- Incumbent Dinesh Kumar Chadha
- Party: Aam Aadmi Party
- Elected year: 2022

Rupnagar Assembly constituency (Sl. No.: 50) is a Punjab Legislative Assembly constituency in Rupnagar district, Punjab state, India.

== Members of the Legislative Assembly ==
Most successful parties from Rupnagar Vidhan Sabha
1. SAD (6 Times) (33.3%)
2. INC (5 Times) (27.8%)
3. AAP (2 Times) (11.1%)
4. BJP (1 Time) (5.56%)
5. CPI (1 Time) (5.56%)
6. IND (1 Time) (5.56%)
7. INC (I) (1 Time) (5.56%)
8. JP (1 Time) (5.56%)

Year	Member	Party
Rupar constituency
1952	Rajinder Singh	Indian National Congress
1952	Partap Singh	Shiromani Akali Dal
1957	Partap Singh	Indian National Congress
1957	Sadhu Singh	Independent
1962	Shamsher Singh	Communist Party of India
1967	Gurbachan Singh	Indian National Congress
1969	Ravi Indar Singh	Shiromani Akali Dal
1972	Gurbachan Singh	Indian National Congress
Anandpur Sahib-Ropar constituency
1977	Madho Singh	Janata Party
1980	Basant Singh	Indian National Congress (Indira)
1985	Tara Singh	Shiromani Akali Dal
1992	Ramesh Dutt	Bharatiya Janata Party
1997	Tara Singh	Shiromani Akali Dal
2002	Ramesh Dutt Sharma	Indian National Congress
2007	Sant Ajit Singh	Shiromani Akali Dal
Rupnagar constituency
2012	Daljit Singh Cheema	Shiromani Akali Dal
2017	Amarjit Singh Sandoa	Aam Aadmi Party
2022	Dinesh Kumar Chadha	Aam Aadmi Party

== Election results ==
=== 2027 ===
Punjab Assembly election, 2027: Rupnagar
Party	Candidate	Votes	%	±%
AAP	Dinesh Kumar Chadha			
AD (WPD)				New entry
INC				
BSP				
SAD				
BJP				
NOTA	None of the above			
Majority				
Turnout				

=== 2022 ===
Punjab Assembly election, 2022: Rupnagar
Party	Candidate	Votes	%	±%
AAP	Dinesh Kumar Chadha	59,903	44.11	
INC	Brinder Singh Dhillon	36,371	26.71	
SAD	Daljit Singh Cheema	22,338	16.45	
BJP	Iqbal Singh Lalpura	10,067	7.41	
Independent	Subedar Avtar Singh	3,339	2.46	
Independent	Devinder Singh Bajwa	1,929	1.42	
Independent	Bachitar Singh	741	0.55	
Punjab Kisan Dal	Paramjeet Singh Mukari	519	0.38	
NOTA	None of the above	686	0.51	
Majority		23,632	17.4	
Turnout		135,793	100	
Registered electors				

=== 2017 ===
Punjab Assembly election, 2017: Rupnagar
Party	Candidate	Votes	%	±%
AAP	Amarjit Singh Sandoa	58,992	45.4	
INC	Brinder Singh Dhillon	35,281	27.10	
SAD	Daljit Singh Cheema	31,903	24.50	
NOTA	None of the above	917	0.50	
Majority		23,707	18.4	
Turnout		129,167	76.7	
Registered electors		169,610		

=== Previous Results ===
Year	A C No.	Category	Winner	Party	Votes	Runner Up	Party	Votes
1951	42	GEN	Partap Singh	SAD	23898	Prithvi Singh Azad	PDCL	21148
1951	42	GEN	Raijinder Singh	INC	28390	Sadhu Singh	SAD	26187
1952	8	GEN	Partap Singh	AD	28014	S. Singh	AD	27239
1952	8	GEN	Raijinder Singh	AD	28120	Atma Singh	INC	25764
1957	8	Reserved ST	Partap Singh	INC	25142	Piyara Singh	IND	19454
1957	8	Reserved ST	Sadhu Singh	IND	34096	Sarmukh Singh	INC	25866
1962	11	GEN	Shamsher Singh	CPI	13542	Sadhu Singh	INC	12192
1967	74	GEN	G. Singh	INC	21314	S. S. Josh	CPI	13288
1969	74	GEN	Ravi Indar Singh	SAD	21007	Rajinder Singh	INC	17039
1972	74	GEN	Gurbachan Singh	INC	21383	Harchand Singh	IND	12595
2012	50	GEN	Daljit Singh Cheema	SAD	41595	Romesh Dutt Sharma	INC	32716

== See also ==
- List of constituencies of the Punjab Legislative Assembly
- Rupnagar district
