= Interim East Punjab Assembly =

Law governing body of East Punjab

- Interim Assembly

Type
- Type: Unicameral

History
- Founded: 3 June 1947
- Disbanded: 20 June 1951
- Preceded by: Punjab Provincial Assembly
- Succeeded by: Punjab Legislative Assembly

Leadership
- Speaker: Kapur Singh
- Deputy Speaker: Thakur Panchan Chand (1947-1951)
- Shanno Devi (1951)
- Leader of House (Chief Minister): Gopi Chand Bhargava (1947-1949)
- Bhim Sen Sachar (1949)
- Gopi Chand Bhargava (1949-51)
- Leader of the Opposition: Vacant (no official opposition)

Structure
- Seats: 79
- Political groups: Government (79): INC (79)
- Length of term: 4 years, 17 days

Elections
- Voting system: first-past-the-post
- Last election: 1946
- Next election: 1952

The Interim East Punjab Assembly was a unicameral governing and law making body of the newly formed Indian state of East Punjab.

== History ==
On 3 June 1947, the assembly, which was elected in 1946 divided into two parts. One was West Punjab Assembly and other was East Punjab Assembly. This was done to decide whether or not the province of Punjab should be partitioned. After voting on both sides, the partition was decided. Consequently, the existing Punjab Provincial Assembly was also divided into West Punjab Legislative Assembly and the East Punjab Legislative Assembly. The sitting members belonging to the Western Section subsequently became the members of the new Assembly renamed as the West Punjab Legislative Assembly. The sitting members belonging to the Eastern Section subsequently became the members of the new Assembly renamed as the East Punjab Legislative Assembly. The members, which were elected in 1946 election on the ticket of Shiromani Akali Dal and Unionist Party after Partition, all joined the Indian National Congress. Initially there were total 48 members but after returning of some members till 1948 who stayed in Pakistan during Partition the total strength increased to 79.

On 15 August 1947, Gopi Chand Bhargava elected the Chief Minister of East Punjab by Members of Interim Assembly.

On the date of 1 November 1947, it was the first-time interim assembly sit. Kapur Singh was the elected Speaker that day and two days later on 3 November, Thakur Panchan Chand was the elected Deputy speaker.

Thakur Panchan Chand resigned from the post of Deputy Speaker on 20 March 1951. On 26 March 1951, Smt. Shanno Devi was the elected Deputy Speaker. The Interim Assembly was dissolved on 20 June 1951.

== Political Upheavals ==
During Partition, congress senior leader Bhimsen Sachar stayed in Pakistan. The stalwart leader Gopi Chand Bhargava elected the leader of Congress legislature party and he became the first Chief Minister.

Dethrone Bhargava

In 1948, Bhimsen Sachar and Giani Kartar Singh came to India and offered their services to help rehabilitate refugees in India. After his arrival, the tussle between two factions to capture political power increased. Sachar Group, included leaders like Kedar Nath Sehgal, Shanno Devi and Prabodh Chandra, was able to convince Congress High Command that Bhargava had failed in effectively tacking the refugee problem, maintenance of law and order and had failed to command a majority support in the state legislature.

Ultimately on 6 April 1949, Congress High Command directed Bhargava to seek vote of confidence from Congress Assembly Party. Dr. Bhargava failed to secure the confidence of the house by margin of one vote only. The no-confidence motion was carried by forty votes in favour and thirty nine against the motion. On same day Sachar was elected leader of the Congress and he took oath of Chief Minister on 13 April.

Return of Bhargava

After Bhargava removal from the post of Chief Minister, he along with his faction included leaders like Swaran Singh, Partap Singh Kairon, Giani Kartar Singh and Prithvi Singh Azad, submitted a memorandum against Sachar to Congress High Command, which was duly signed by 34 Legislators belonging to Bhargava faction. High Command demanded explanation from Sachar but he failed to reply. On 17 October 1949, on the direction of Central leadership, he resigned from the post and Bhargava took the oath of office on the following day. Kairon switched to Sachar faction as he failed to get a berth in Bhargava's cabinet. This led to factionalism with in the Congress party.

== Dissolution of Assembly ==
The tussle between Sachar and Bhargava factions worsened more. Even after securing a vote against no confidence motion by the difference of only five votes; 31 in favour of the no confidence motion and 36 against, while 4 were absent, Sachar group submitted a memorandum against Gopi Chand Bhargava and blamed for corruption. On this, High Command directed Bhargava to include members of Sachar-Kairon faction into Cabinet but Bhargava refused to do so. On 11 June 1951, Parliamentary Board decided that Bhargava should resign and no other Congress ministry should function in East Punjab till the completion of First General elections. Finally on 16 June Bhargava resigned from the post of Chief Minister and Governor of Punjab sent a report to President of India to impose President's rule in state. Punjab was formally brought under the President's rule on 20 June 1951.

== Merger of Akalis in Congress ==
After Partition, Akali Dal and other Independent MLAs joined the Government and in 1948, Udham Singh Nagoke, Swaran Singh, Gyani Kartar Singh and Baldev Singh dissoleved Assembly Akali Party and merged with Congress. However, Master Tara Singh declared that Akali Dal would continue to be political arm of the Sikhs. On 20 June 1950, Akali Dal adopted a resolution and directed its MLAs to resign from Congress Party but only one MLA resigned from Congress Legislative Party.

== See also ==
- First Punjab Legislative Assembly
