= Dharamkot Assembly constituency =

Legislative Assembly constituency in Punjab State, India

Coordinates: 30.94°N 75.23°E

Dharamkot
- Constituency No. 74 for the Punjab Legislative Assembly

Constituency details
- Country: India
- State: Punjab
- District: Moga
- Lok Sabha constituency: Faridkot
- Total electors: 181,612 (in 2022)
- Reservation: None

Member of Legislative Assembly
- 16th Punjab Legislative Assembly
- Incumbent Devinderjit Singh Laddi Dhos
- Party: Aam Aadmi Party
- Elected year: 2022

Dharamkot Assembly constituency (Sl. No.: 74) is a Punjab Legislative Assembly constituency in Moga district, Punjab state, India.

== Members of the Legislative Assembly ==
Most successful parties from Dharamkot Vidhan Sabha
1. SAD (6 Times) (42.9%)
2. CPI (2 Times) (14.3%)
3. INC (2 Times) (14.3%)
4. AAP (1 Time) (7.14%)
5. AD - SFS (1 Time) (7.14%)
6. BSP (1 Time) (7.14%)
7. PJP (1 Time) (7.14%)

Year	Member	Party
1962	Kultar Singh	Shiromani Akali Dal
1967	Lachhman Singh Gill	Akali Dal – Sant Fateh Singh Group
1969	Lachhman Singh Gill	Punjab Janata Party
1972	Kulwant Kaur	Shiromani Akali Dal
1977	Sarwan Singh	Communist Party of India
1980	Sarwan Singh	Communist Party of India
1985	Gurdev Singh Gill	Indian National Congress
1992	Baldev Singh	Bahujan Samaj Party
1997	Seetal Singh	Shiromani Akali Dal
2002	Seetal Singh	Shiromani Akali Dal
2007	Seetal Singh	Shiromani Akali Dal
2012	Tota Singh	Shiromani Akali Dal
2017	Sukhjit Singh Kaka Lohgarh	Indian National Congress
2022	Devinderjit Singh Laddi Dhos	Aam Aadmi Party

== Election results ==
=== 2027 ===
Punjab Assembly election, 2027: Dharamkot
Party	Candidate	Votes	%	±%
AAP	Devinderjeet Singh Laddi Dhos			
AD (WPD)				New entry
INC				
BSP				
SAD				
BJP				New entry
NOTA	None of the above			
Majority				
Turnout				

=== 2022 ===
Punjab Assembly election, 2022: Dharamkot
Party	Candidate	Votes	%	±%
AAP	Devinderjeet Singh Laddi Dhos	65,378	45.97	
INC	Sukhjit Singh Kaka Lohgarh	35,406	24.9	
SAD	Tota Singh	30,495	21.44	
SAD(A)	Balraj Singh Khalsa	6,200	4.36	
Independent	Harpreet Singh Hero	1,615	1.14	
PLC	Ravinder Singh Grewal	753	0.53	
NOTA	None of the above	746	0.52	
Majority		29,972	21.07	
Turnout				
Registered electors		181,612		
AAP gain from INC				

=== 2017 ===
Punjab Assembly election, 2017: Dharamkot
Party	Candidate	Votes	%	±%
INC	Sukhjit Singh Kaka Lohgarh	63,238	43.92	
SAD	Tota Singh	41020	28.49	
AAP	Daljit Singh	34615	24.04	
CPI	Surat Singh	1325	0.92	
SAD(A)	Balraj Singh	1089	0.76	
BSP	Jagga Singh	456	0.32	
Independent	Vikas	312	0.22	
IKL	Baljit Singh	291	0.2	
APP	Sukhpal Singh	258	0.18	
Independent	Manjit Kaur	197	0.14	
BMP	Gurdeep Singh	186	0.13	
NOTA	None of the above	1009	0.7	
Majority				
Turnout				
Registered electors		174,148		
INC gain from SAD				

=== Previous results ===
Year	A C No.	Category	Name	Party	Votes	Runner Up	Party	Votes
2012	74	GEN	Tota Singh	SAD	62887	Sukhjit Singh	INC	58632
2007	97	Reserved	Sital Singh	SAD	47277	Kewal Singh	INC	41577
2002	98	Reserved	Sital Singh	SAD	35729	Mukhtiar Singh	IND	20200
1997	98	Reserved	Sital Singh	SAD	57400	Kewal Singh	INC	30758
1992	98	Reserved	Baldev Singh	BSP	5753	Piara Singh	INC	4429
1985	98	Reserved	Gurdevsingh Gill	INC	16573	Sital Singh	IND	16296
1980	98	Reserved	Sarwan Singh	CPI	26664	Mukhtiar Singh	INC (I)	12351
1977	98	Reserved	Sarwan Singh	CPI	15370	Mukhtiar Singh	IND	14389
1972	12	GEN	Kulwant Kaur	SAD	29234	Jagmohan Singh	INC	24266
1969	12	GEN	Lachhman Singh	PJP	29129	Sohan Singh	SAD	22742
1967	12	GEN	Lachhman Singh	ADS	22634	R. Singh	INC	16733
1962	85	Reserved	Kultar Singh	AD	23164	Mukhtiar Singh	INC	15289

== Moga-Dharamkot constituency ==
During 1952 Punjab Legislative Assembly election, Moga-Dharamkot constituency was one of 21 two-member constituencies.

1952 Punjab Legislative Assembly election : Moga-Dharamkot
Party	Candidate	Votes	%
SAD	Davinder Singh	19,429	18.97
INC	Rattan Singh	18,492	18.05
SAD	Mukhtair Singh	18,492	16.05
INC	Sohan Singh	15,907	15.53
CPI	Mehar Singh	9,212	8.99
Independent	Lal	6,100	5.96
Socialist Party (India)	Roop Lal Sathi	3,641	3.55
ABJS	Sain Dass	2,464	2.41
Socialist Party (India)	Lal Chand	2,358	2.30
Independent	Bachitar Singh	2,023	1.98
Independent	Labh Singh	1,555	1.52
AIFB	Anokh Singh	1,320	1.29
Independent	Sandhu Ram	932	0.91
Independent	Sikandar Lal	736	0.72
Independent	Wazir Singh	662	0.65
Independent	Bakhtawar Singh	648	0.63
Independent	Sher Singh	503	0.49
Turnout		1,02,421	98.33
Registered electors		1,04,163	
