= Nachhatar Pal =

Indian politician

Member of the Punjab Legislative Assembly
- Incumbent
- Assumed office 2022
- Preceded by: Angad Singh
- Constituency: Nawan Shahr

Personal details
- Born: Nawan Shahr
- Party: Bahujan Samaj Party
- Occupation: Businessman

Nachhatar Pal is an Indian politician representing the Nawan Shahr Assembly constituency in the Punjab Legislative Assembly. He is a member of the Bahujan Samaj Party.

== Member of Legislative Assembly ==
He represents the Nawan Shahr Assembly constituency as MLA in Punjab Assembly.

Committee assignments of Punjab Legislative Assembly

- Member - Committee on the Welfare of Scheduled Castes, Scheduled Tribes and Backward Classes
- Member - committee on Petitions

== Electoral performance ==
Punjab Assembly election, 2022: Nawanshahr
Party	Candidate	Votes	%	±%
BSP	Nachhatar Pal	37,031	29.9	▲14.58
AAP	Lalit Mohan Pathak	31,655	25.55	▲0.24
Independent	Angad Singh	31,516	25.44	New
INC	Satvir Singh Palli Jhikki	6,998	5.65	▼24.33
SAD(A)	Davinder Singh	5,037	4.07	New
BJP	Poonam Manik	3,226	2.60	New
NOTA	None of the above	643	0.52	▼0.14
Majority		5,376	4.34	▲1.65
Turnout		123,868	69.8	
Registered electors		177,391		
