= Guriqbal Kaur =

Indian politician

Member of the Punjab Legislative Assembly
- In office 2012–2017
- Preceded by: Jatinder Singh Kariha
- Succeeded by: Angad Singh
- Constituency: Nawan Shahr Assembly Constituency

Personal details
- Party: Indian National Congress
- Spouse: Parkash Singh
- Occupation: Politician

Guriqbal Kaur is an Indian politician from the state of Punjab who was a member of the Punjab Legislative Assembly.

== Constituency ==
Kaur represented the Nawan Shahr Assembly Constituency in Punjab.

== Political party ==
Kaur is a member of the Indian National Congress.

Kaur was one of the 42 Indian National Congress MLAs who submitted their resignations in protest at a decision of the Supreme Court of India ruling that Punjab's termination of the Sutlej-Yamuna Link (SYL) water canal was unconstitutional.

== Personal life ==
Kaur was married to Parkash Singh who was a member of the Punjab Legislative Assembly from 2002 to 2007 from the Nawan Shahr constituency. The seat was given to her after his death in 2010, and she represented it from 2012 to 2017. She was succeeded as MLA by her son Angad Singh Saini.
