= Jatinder Singh Kariha =

Indian politician

Member of the Punjab Legislative Assembly
- In office 2007–2012
- Preceded by: Parkash Singh
- Succeeded by: Guriqbal Kaur
- Constituency: Nawan Shahr Assembly Constituency
- In office 2000–2002
- In office 1977–1982

Personal details
- Died: 2011
- Party: Shiromani Akali Dal
- Spouse: Satinder Kaur Kariha
- Occupation: Politician

Jatinder Singh Sandhu (Kariha; died in 2011) was an Indian politician from the state of Punjab. He was a two term member of the Punjab Legislative Assembly, where he represented the Nawan Shahr Assembly Constituency as a member of the Shiromani Akali Dal.

== Biography ==
Kariha's father, Hardev Singh Kariha, was also involved in politics. Kariha was elected in both the 2000 and 2007 legislative elections.

== Personal life ==
Kariha died of a heart attack in 2011. He was survived by his wife, four daughters, a daughter-in-law, as well as two grandchildren.
