= Thakur Panchan Chand =

Indian politician

Thakur Panchan Chand was an Indian politician who served as Deputy Speaker of Interim East Punjab Assembly from 3 November 1947 to 20 March 1951 and Member of 2nd Punjab Legislative Assembly from Kangra North Assembly constituency. He was the first deputy speaker of Punjab.
