= Devinderjeet Singh Laddi Dhose =

Indian politician

MLA, Punjab Legislative Assembly
- Incumbent
- Assumed office 2022
- Preceded by: Sukhjit Singh (INC)
- Constituency: Dharamkot
- Majority: Aam Aadmi Party

Personal details
- Party: Aam Aadmi Party

Devinderjeet Singh Laddi Dhose is an Indian politician and the MLA representing the Dharamkot Assembly constituency in the Punjab Legislative Assembly. He is a member of the Aam Aadmi Party. He was elected as the MLA in the 2022 Punjab Legislative Assembly election.

== Political career ==
In 2022, Dhose successfully contested the assembly election from Dharamkot Assembly constituency defeating Sukhjit Singh Kaka Lohgarh (INC) the incumbent MLA from Dharamkot. The Aam Aadmi Party gained a strong 79% majority in the sixteenth Punjab Legislative Assembly by winning 92 out of 117 seats in the 2022 Punjab Legislative Assembly election. MP Bhagwant Mann was sworn in as Chief Minister on 16 March 2022.

== Member of Legislative Assembly ==
He represents the Dharamkot Assembly constituency as MLA in Punjab Assembly.

Committee assignments of Punjab Legislative Assembly

- Member (2022–23) Committee on Public Accounts
- Member (2022–23) Committee on Co-operation and its allied activities

== Electoral Performance ==
Punjab Assembly election, 2022: Dharamkot
Party	Candidate	Votes	%	±%
AAP	Devinderjeet Singh Laddi Dhos	65,378	45.97	
INC	Sukhjit Singh Kaka Lohgarh	35,406	24.9	
SAD	Tota Singh	30,495	21.44	
SAD(A)	Balraj Singh Khalsa	6,200	4.36	
Independent	Harpreet Singh Hero	1,615	1.14	
PLC	Ravinder Singh Grewal	753	0.53	
NOTA	None of the above	746	0.52	
Majority		29,972	21.07	
Turnout				
Registered electors		181,612		
AAP gain from INC				

State Legislative Assembly
Preceded by Sukhjit Singh (INC)	Member of the Punjab Legislative Assembly from Dharamkot Assembly constituency 2022 –	Incumbent
