= 1st Punjab Assembly =

1st election of Punjab Legislative Assembly

First Punjab Legislative Assembly

Type
- Type: Unicameral
- Houses: Punjab Legislative Assembly

History
- Founded: 3 May 1952
- Disbanded: 31 March 1957
- Preceded by: Interim East Punjab Assembly
- Succeeded by: Second Punjab Legislative Assembly

Leadership
- Speaker: Satya Pal (1952-1954),
- Gurdial Singh Dhillon (1954-1957)
- Deputy Speaker: Gurdial Singh Dhillon (1952-1954)
- Sarup Singh (1954-1957)
- Leader of the House: Bhim Sen Sachar (1952-1956)
- Pratap Singh Kairon (1956-1957)
- Leader of the Opposition: Gopal Singh Khalsa (1952-1956)
- Vacant (1956-1957)

Structure
- Seats: 126
- Political groups: Government (96): INC (96); Opposition (30): SAD (13); CPI (4); ZP (2); FB (1); LCPHU (1); Ind (9)
- Length of term: 1952-1957

Elections
- Voting system: first-past-the-post
- Last election: 1952
- Next election: 1957

The 1952 Punjab Legislative Assembly election were the First Vidhan Sabha (Legislative Assembly) elections of the state when the Indian National Congress emerged as the largest party with 96 seats in the 126-seat legislature in the election. The Shiromani Akali Dal became the official opposition, holding 13 seats.

== Sachar Era ==
During the first general election (1952) Gopichand Bhargava got sore with Congress High Command over the allotment of seats and resigned in the protest. He fought the elections as an independent, and lost. With Bhargava exit, one of the faction leaders came under eclipse. After the election with the attainment of absolute majority by the Congressmen, there was a struggle for leadership. The main aspirants for The throne were Pratap Singh Kairon, Swaran Singh and Bhimsen Sachar. Besides the Kairon group secured majority support in the Congress Party, and Nehru, the president of the Congress party claimed Kairon to be one of the "strongest pillars". Bhimsen Sachar was tipped to be the leader of the Punjab Congress assembly party in the place of Kairon.

== Political Upheavals ==
Rift in Council of Ministers

Even before Council of Ministers took oath a conflict rose as Partap Singh Kairon objected to 'Revenue' being put in the portfolio of Swaran Singh on the ground that it had been already agreed to between Nehru and him that in addition to 'Development', 'Revenue' including 'Consolidation of Holdings' would also form part of his portfolios. Sachar tried to convince Kairon to allow 'Revenue' to remain with Swaran Singh but he failed to convince him. Ultimately, the Chief Minister had to allocate the 'Revenue' portfolio to Kairon and Swaran Singh got 'Capital Project and Electricity' portfolio.

Sachar v/s Sharma

Since its very inception, the Sachar Ministry did not sail smoothly. There was a rift among his Council of Ministers itself. Shri Ram Sharma was annoyed with Kairon on the pretext that he had been denied a square deal by kairon and Jagat Narain. Sharma was dead set on a final trial of strength between two factions in the organisational setup at the earliest possible opportunity. He, however, apprehended that the Chief Minister would incline in favour of Kairon and Jagat Narain which may prove detrimental to Sharma. The Chief Minister advised Sharma to sit around the table to resolve the difference in an objective manner.

It was alleged by intelligence sources that on 8 April 1953 the dissident Congressmen numbering about twenty-five had a secret meeting at the residence of Dr Satyapal (then speaker of Punjab Legislative Assembly). Sachar informed Nehru and Maulana Azad about the alleged meeting of dissidents. Nehru in turn warned Shri Ram Sharma and Dr. Satyapal against their disruptionist activities Nehru good very much annoyed with these faction leaders.

Sachar's Resignation

Sachar, now fed up with Sharma, to get rid from him, on 22 July 1953 (a day of dramatic events), he suddenly resigned from the Chief Ministership and wrote to Governor:

I am sorry to inform you that circumstances have arisen necessitating my resignation from the office of Chief Minister. I, therefore, beg to tender my resignation as Chief Minister.

On the same day, the Governor accepted the resignation and then invited Sachar to form a new ministry. The Governor wrote to Sachar:

I have already sent you a letter accepting your resignation and, therefore, of your cabinet. As your party is the majority party in the legislature and as you are the leader of the same, I wish to invite you to come and discuss with me the possibility of forming a new cabinet. Would, you, therefore, make it convenient to me and see me at 6.45 this evening.

22 July 1953, saw certain fast moving dramatic developments. Sachar resigned. His resignation accepted, and then he was then re-sworn as the Chief Minister on the same day and Sachar formed the new Council of Ministers by dropping Shri Ram Sharma this time.

Kairon v/s Narain

One-time joint faction of Kairon-Narain, both Ministers in Sachar Cabinet showing signs of cleavage. This was mainly due to Jagat Narain's favour for nationalisation of motor transport in the State while Kairon vehemently opposed it due to the fact that this industry was mainly controlled by those who backed Kairon politically as well as financially. The blame was on Kairon that he manipulate dissident Congressmen to level certain charges of corruption against Jagat Naraini in Assembly.

On 22 March 1955, during Assembly session, Chief Minister made an offer to opposition legislators that if they were to appoint committee of their own and could bring to his notice any specific charges against Jagat Narain. On the following day the opposition benches constituted themselves into a Committee and demanded Jagat Narain be relieved of his Education portfolio first. Narain himself gave assent and Chief Minister took the same portfolio from him. On next day, opposition demanded that Narain should also be relieved from other portfolios also. Narain again himself expressed his wish to be relieved. Sachar accepted Narain's resignation and took the portfolios under his charge. This was, however, an open secret that it was Kairon's strategy to weaken Narain politically.

Kairon v/s Sachar

In May 1955, Akali Dal launched Agitation as imposition of restrictions on holding public meetings and organising processions. On 4 July, Police entered the precincts of a Sikh shrine Harmandir Sahib to arrest some of the agitators. The Chief Minister publicly apologised for police entry into the holy place of worship.

The lenient attitude of Sachar towards Akalis was exploited by Kairon. On 15 July, Jathedar Mohan Singh Nagoke went to Jalandhar and had a dialogue with Comrade Ram Kishan and assured that Nagoke group would help the Kairon group to oust Sachar. On this Sachar sought permission of the Congress High Command to drop Kairon from his cabinet. U. N. Dhebar, Congress National President, on 5 August blamed Sachar for the lapses and made it categorically clear that "there can be no thought of displacing Kairon or replacing him". Even after initiatives by Maulana Azad the conflict between two leading leaders never resolved.

== Sachar's Resignation ==
Dissidence in the Congress party continued on unabated. The decedent MLAs resentment was directed against Sachar because of two reasons. First, handling of the allegations of nepotism in corruption levelled by the opposition against Jagat Narain. Second, dissidents blamed Sachar for the lenient attitude towards the Akali's agitation. Kairon convinced the Congress High Command that Sachar was incapable of dealing with a Akali agitations in Punjab and lacked rapport with the State Congressman.

In January 1956, Sachar went to Delhi to attend the National Development Council. During this, Sachar sought an appointment from Jawahar Lal Nehru, who retorted. Sachar felt let down. On the following day, Sachar wrote his resignation letter to Nehru. In it, he stated:-

It appears to me that I have lost your confidence. I shall therefore feel grateful if you would have enclosed resignation sent to the Governor, Punjab.

In an enclosed resignation to Governor C. P. N. Singh, on 7 January 1956, Sachar wrote the only line:-

I hereby tender my resignation from the office of the Chief Minister.

On 14 January 1956, Bhimsen Sachar resigned from the Leadership of Punjab Congress Assembly Party. On 21 January, Partap Singh Kairon elected as new leader and on 23rd he took oath of the Office of Chief Minister.

== Akali's merger in Congress ==
The growing strength of Tara Singh cause a concern for the Congress Party. To counter the demand for Punjabi Suba by Akali Dal led by Tara Singh, 'Maha Punjab' campaign was started by some groups. The growing strength of Akali Dal alarmed the Congress leadership.

In 1956, an understanding was reached between ruling Congress and opposition Akali Dal, after which Akali stalwart joined Congress Party. The Akali accepted the regional plan at their meeting on 30 September 1956. Akali Dal didn't contest 1957 General election on their own.

== PEPSU merger in Punjab ==
In 1955, State Reorganisation Commission recommended the merger of Punjab and Patiala and East Punjab States Union (PEPSU). PEPSU Assembly had 60 members. With its merger on 1 November 1956, the strength of Punjab Legislative Assembly increased from 126 to 186. On 6 November 1956, all members re-sworn in Punjab Legislative Assembly.
