= Dinesh Chadha =

Indian politician

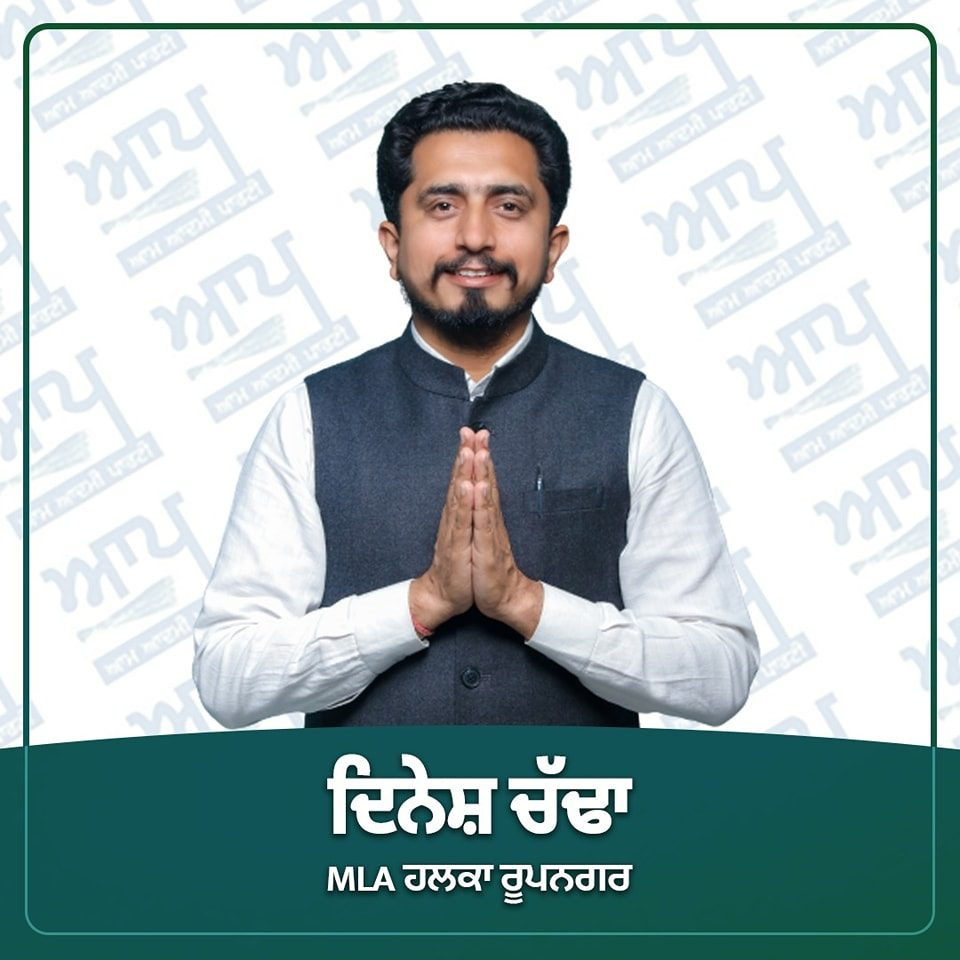
- Dinesh Chadha in 2022

MLA, Punjab Legislative Assembly
- Incumbent
- Assumed office 2022
- Constituency: Rupnagar
- Majority: Aam Aadmi Party

Personal details
- Party: Aam Aadmi Party

Dinesh Kumar Chadha is an Indian politician and the MLA representing the Rupnagar Assembly constituency in the Punjab Legislative Assembly. He is a member of the Aam Aadmi Party. He was elected as the MLA in the 2022 Punjab Legislative Assembly election.

== Member of Legislative Assembly ==
He represents the Rupnagar Assembly constituency as MLA in Punjab Assembly. The Aam Aadmi Party gained a strong 79% majority in the sixteenth Punjab Legislative Assembly by winning 92 out of 117 seats in the 2022 Punjab Legislative Assembly election. MP Bhagwant Mann was sworn in as Chief Minister on 16 March 2022.

Committee assignments of Punjab Legislative Assembly

- Member (2022–23) Committee on Panchayati Raj Institutions
- Member (2022–23) Committee on Co-operation and its allied activities

== Electoral performance ==
Punjab Assembly election, 2022: Rupnagar
Party	Candidate	Votes	%	±%
AAP	Dinesh Kumar Chadha	59,903	44.11	
INC	Brinder Singh Dhillon	36,371	26.71	
SAD	Daljit Singh Cheema	22,338	16.45	
BJP	Iqbal Singh Lalpura	10,067	7.41	
Independent	Subedar Avtar Singh	3,339	2.46	
Independent	Devinder Singh Bajwa	1,929	1.42	
Independent	Bachitar Singh	741	0.55	
Punjab Kisan Dal	Paramjeet Singh Mukari	519	0.38	
NOTA	None of the above	686	0.51	
Majority		23632	17.4	
Turnout		135793	100	
Registered electors				

State Legislative Assembly
Preceded by -	Member of the Punjab Legislative Assembly from Rupnagar Assembly constituency 2022 –	Incumbent
