= Ranbir Bhullar =

Indian politician

MLA, Punjab Legislative Assembly
- Incumbent
- Assumed office 2022
- Preceded by: Parminder Singh Pinki
- Constituency: Firozpur City
- Majority: Aam Aadmi Party

Personal details
- Party: Aam Aadmi Party

Ranbir Singh Bhullar is an Indian politician and the MLA representing the Firozpur City Assembly constituency in the Punjab Legislative Assembly. He is a member of the Aam Aadmi Party. He was elected as the MLA in the 2022 Punjab Legislative Assembly election.

== MLA ==
The Aam Aadmi Party gained a strong 79% majority in the sixteenth Punjab Legislative Assembly by winning 92 out of 117 seats in the 2022 Punjab Legislative Assembly election. MP Bhagwant Mann was sworn in as Chief Minister on 16 March 2022.

Committee assignments of Punjab Legislative Assembly

- Member (2022–23) Committee on Subordinate Legislation
- Member (2022–23) Committee on Papers laid/to be laid on the table and Library

== Electoral performance ==
Punjab Assembly election, 2022: Firozpur City
Party	Candidate	Votes	%	±%
AAP	Ranbir Bhullar	48,943	38.91	▲25.9
INC	Parminder Singh Pinky	28,874	23.19	▼31.07
BJP	Rana Gurmit Singh Sodhi	24,635	19.79	▼10.71
SAD	Rohit Vohra	17,757	14.26	New
SAD(A)	Tejinder Singh Deol	2,025	1.63	▲1.25
NOTA	None of the above	451	0.36	▼0.39
Majority		20,069	15.72	▼8.04
Turnout		1,24,499	71.98	▲1.52
Registered electors		172,957		
AAP gain from INC		Swing		

State Legislative Assembly
Preceded by -	Member of the Punjab Legislative Assembly from Firozpur City Assembly constituency 2022 –	Incumbent
