= Daljit Singh Cheema =

Indian politician

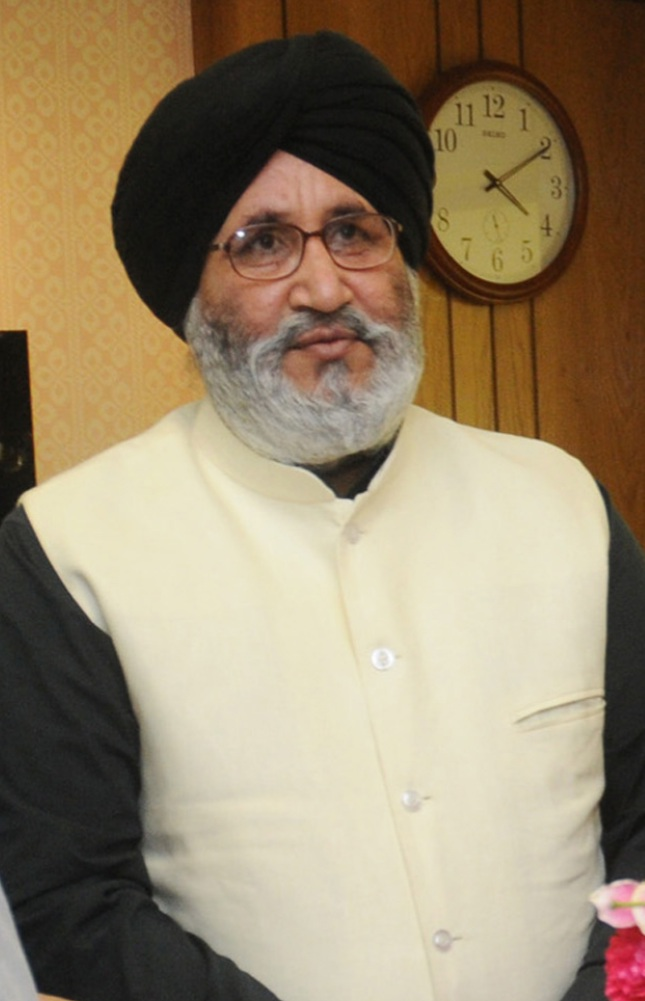

Minister Government of Punjab for Education
- In office 2014–2017
- Constituency: Ropar Assembly Constituency

Member of the Punjab Legislative Assembly
- Incumbent
- Assumed office 2012-2017

Personal details
- Born: 2 March 1962 (age 64) Mari Bhuchian, District. Gurdaspur
- Party: Shiromani Akali Dal
- Spouse: Dr.(Mrs) Harwinder Kaur Cheema
- Children: 2
- Education: Guru Gobind Singh Medical College
- Occupation: Politician
- Profession: Doctor

Dr. Daljit Singh Cheema (born 2 March 1962) is an Indian politician from the state of Punjab and was the Education Minister in the Punjab government.

== Educational/professional qualification ==
Cheema completed his M.B.B.S. medical degree. He took six-month residencies in Orthopedics and Ophthalmology from the Guru Gobind Singh Medical College (G.G.S. Medical College), Faridkot.

== Constituency ==
Cheema represented the Rupnagar Assembly Constituency of Punjab from 2012–2017. During this span of his serving his constituency as the MLA of Ropar, this region has seen developments such as First and IIT of Punjab has been set up in Ropar. Rupnagar Flyover has been developed as one of its own kind in the whole state.

== Political party ==
Cheema is an active member of Shiromani Akali Dal. He is designated as Secretary and Spokesman to Shiromani Akali Dal. Earlier he also served the Party as Advisor to Chief Minister, Punjab (in the rank of Cabinet Minister) in 2007-2012.

== Other positions ==
- Education Minister of Punjab (2012–2017)
- Member of Legislative Assembly, Punjab from Rupnagar Assembly Constituency (2012–2017)
- Chairman - Sub Committee of CABE (Central Advisory Board for Education)
- Member State Literacy Mission Authority, Punjab
