= Angad Singh (INC politician) =

Indian politician

Member of the Punjab Legislative Assembly
- In office 4 February 2017 – 2022
- Preceded by: Guriqbal Kaur
- Constituency: Nawan Shahr

Personal details
- Born: 23 October 1990 (age 35) Amritsar, Punjab, India
- Party: Indian National Congress
- Spouse(s): Aditi Singh (m. 2019- div.2023); Chinar Kad (m.2024)
- Parent(s): Parkash Singh (father); Guriqbal Kaur (mother)
- Occupation: Politician

Angad Singh Saini (born 23 October 1990) is an Indian politician representing Congress Party and businessman hailing from the Nawanshahr district of Punjab. In 2017, aged 26 years, he became one of the youngest members to be elected to the Punjab Legislative Assembly. He was married to Aditi Singh, MLA from Uttar Pradesh.

Nawan Shahr Vidhan Sabha seat was represented by Dilbagh Singh six times. Later Dilbagh Singh's nephew Parkash Singh won the seat in 2002. Parkash Singh lost the seat in 2007, was diagnosed with cancer the same year, and succumbed to it in 2010. Angad Singh is Parkash Singh's son. He succeeded his mother Gur Iqbal Kaur as MLA from Nawanshahr seat.
