= Prabodh Chandra =

Prabodh Chandra may refer to:

- Prabodh Chandra Bagchi, academic
- Prabodh Chandra Goswami, teacher
- Prabodh Chandra Sengupta, academic
- Prabodh Chandra Dey, Indian singer
- Prabodh Chandra (politician)
