= Tota Singh =

Indian politician (1941–2022)

Jathedar Tota Singh

MLA, Punjab
- In office 1997–2007
- Preceded by: Malti (politician)
- Succeeded by: Joginder Pal Jain
- Constituency: Moga
- In office 2012–2017
- Preceded by: Seetal Singh
- Succeeded by: Sukhjit Singh, Kaka Lohgarh
- Constituency: Dharamkot

Minister for Education
- In office 1997–2002
- Chief Minister: Parkash Singh Badal
- Succeeded by: Harnam Dass Johar

Minister for Agriculture
- In office 2012–2017
- Chief Minister: Parkash Singh Badal
- Preceded by: Sucha Singh Langah

Personal details
- Born: 2 March 1941 Didar Singh Wala, Moga, Punjab, British Raj
- Died: 21 May 2022 (aged 81)
- Party: Shiromani Akali Dal

Jathedar Tota Singh (2 March 1941 – 21 May 2022) was an Indian politician who belonged to the Shiromani Akali Dal. He was Minister for Agriculture & NRI Affairs in the previous Punjab Government. He was Senior Vice President and Member, High Power Committee of Shiromani Akali Dal. He was also a Member of the Shiromani Gurdwara Parbandhak Committee. He also served as acting president of Shiromani Akali Dal after Surjit Singh Barnala when Barnala was appointed as Governor of Tamil Nadu in 1989.

== Family and education ==
His father's name was Babu Singh. He completed his school education from his village school and for further studies he joined DM college Moga.

== Political career ==
He was elected to the Punjab Legislative Assembly in 1997 on a Shiromani Akali Dal ticket from Moga. He was made Minister for Education in the Third Badal ministry during 1997–2002. He was re-elected from Moga in 2002. In 2012, he successfully contested from Dharamkot. He was cabinet minister and held portfolio of Agriculture & NRI Affairs. He also served at designation of Chairman Punjab Mandi Board 1985–1987 under Surjit Singh Barnala government. He was a continuous member of Shiromani Gurudwara Parbandak Committee (known as Sikh Parliament) for many years. He also served as acting president of Shiromani Akali Dal after Surjit Singh Barnala when barnala was appointed as governor of Tamil Nadu in 1989.

In 2017, Singh contested the assembly election from Dharamkot Assembly Constituency but was defeated by Sukhjit Singh (INC) who succeeded Singh as the MLA from Dharamkot.

== Corruption charges ==
=== Misuse of Official Vehicle ===
During his tenure as Education Minister (1997–2002), Tota Singh was accused of misusing the official vehicle of the Punjab School Education Board (PSEB), causing a financial loss to the institution. In May 2012, a Mohali court convicted him under the Prevention of Corruption Act. He was sentenced to one year’s rigorous imprisonment and fined ₹30,000. The court, however, acquitted him of disproportionate assets and misuse of the official telephone.

=== PSEB Recruitment Scam ===
Tota Singh was implicated in a recruitment scam involving the appointment of 134 clerks to the PSEB during his time as education minister. In August 2018, a Mohali court acquitted him. However, four other officials, including selection committee members, were convicted for forgery and criminal conspiracy, receiving three-year sentences and fines.

=== Pesticide Scam ===
In 2015, the Punjab Congress accused Tota Singh of involvement in a ₹33 crore "white fly" pesticide scam, alleging distribution of compromised chemicals to cotton farmers. A government inquiry cleared Tota Singh of wrongdoing while issuing show-cause notices to the agriculture department officials implicated.

== Electoral Performance ==
1997 Punjab Legislative Assembly election : Moga
Party	Candidate	Votes	%	±%
SAD	Tota Singh	41,616	47.41	▲47.41
JD	Sathi Vijay Kumar	20,217	23.03	▼7.72
INC	Malti Thapar	16,919	19.27	▼11.51
BSP	Amarjit Singh	5,703	6.50	▼3.51
Independent	Jagdish Chander	2,542	2.90	▼18.11
Majority		21,399	24.38	▲24.35
Turnout		88,825	66.46	▲42.56
Registered electors		1,33,659		
SAD gain from INC				

2002 Punjab Legislative Assembly election : Moga
Party	Candidate	Votes	%	±%
SAD	Tota Singh	42,579	47.91	▲0.50
INC	Sathi Vijay Kumar	42,274	47.56	▲24.53
SAD(A)	Buta Singh	2,125	2.39	▲2.39
CPI(M)	Ved Parkash	120	0.14	▲0.14
Margin of victory		305	0.35	▼24.38
Turnout		89,194	58.01	▼8.45
Registered electors		1,53,753		
SAD hold				

2007 Punjab Legislative Assembly election : Moga
Party	Candidate	Votes	%	±%
INC	Joginder Pal Jain	55,300	47.77	▼1.37
SAD	Tota Singh	54,008	46.65	▼3.70
CPI	Randhir Singh	3,068	2.65	▲2.65
BSP	Kulwant Singh	1,791	0.92	▲0.51
Margin of victory		1,292	1.12	▲0.77
Turnout		1,15,770	75.90	▲17.89
Registered electors		1,52,708		
INC gain from SAD				

Punjab Assembly election, 2017: Dharamkot
Party	Candidate	Votes	%	±%
INC	Sukhjit Singh Kaka Lohgarh	63,238	43.92	
SAD	Tota Singh	41020	28.49	
AAP	Daljit Singh	34615	24.04	
CPI	Surat Singh	1325	0.92	
SAD(A)	Balraj Singh	1089	0.76	
BSP	Jagga Singh	456	0.32	
Independent	Vikas	312	0.22	
IKL	Baljit Singh	291	0.2	
APP	Sukhpal Singh	258	0.18	
Independent	Manjit Kaur	197	0.14	
BMP	Gurdeep Singh	186	0.13	
NOTA	None of the above	1009	0.7	
Majority				
Turnout				
Registered electors		174,148		
INC gain from SAD				
