= Prabodh Chandra (politician) =

Indian politician

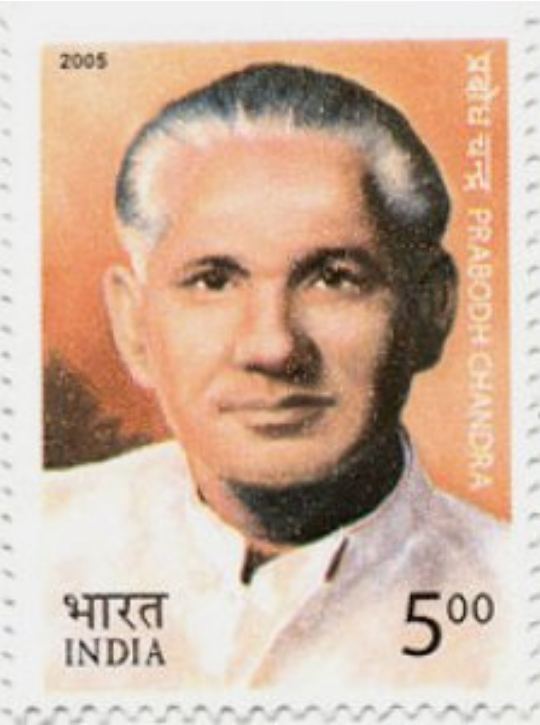

Speaker of Punjab assembly
- In office 14 March 1962 – 18 March 1964
- Preceded by: Gurdial Singh Dhillon
- Succeeded by: Harbans Lal Gupta
- Constituency: Gurdaspur

Member of Lok Sabha
- In office 1971–1977
- Preceded by: Diwan Chand Sharma
- Succeeded by: Yagya Datt Sharma
- Constituency: Gurdaspur

Member of Punjab Legislative Assembly
- In office 1952–1969
- Preceded by: First Holder
- Succeeded by: Mohinder Singh
- Constituency: Gurdaspur

Personal details
- Born: 24 October 1911 Rawalpindi, British India (now in Pakistan)
- Died: 8 February 1986 (aged 74)
- Party: Indian National Congress
- Parent(s): Satya Dev and Durga Devi

Prabodh Chandra was an Indian Independence activist, revolutionary and politician.

== Early life ==
Born at Rawalpindi (now in Pakistan) on 24 October 1911, to Satya Dev, Headmaster of a Government High School and Durga Devi, he did his matriculation from the Government High School, Gujrat, Pakistan in 1927 and his Intermediate as a private candidate in 1930 before completing his graduation and Post Graduation from the F.C. College, Lahore (now in Pakistan). An admirer of Swami Dayanand Saraswati, Subhash Chandra Bose and Maulana Abdul Kalam Azad, he was also influenced by the lives of Shivaji and Garibaldi.

== Political career ==
Chandra started his political career at the age of 16 and formed the Multan Student Union in 1927. He was closely associated with the Lahore Revolutionary Party and was arrested in connection with the Multan Bomb case in 1929. He was first jailed in 1930 and 1936, and again from 1942 to 1945. He laid the foundations of the students' movement in Punjab, and was Chairman of the All India Students' Conference in 1936. He was also selected as the sole representative of the Indian students to the 1938 World Youth Congress which he could not attend.

Later on he joined the Indian National Congress and was a member of the Punjab Pradesh Congress Committee. He was elected a Member of the Punjab Legislative Assembly in 1946. After independence, he remained Member of the Punjab Legislative Assembly in 1952, 1960 and 1962.

He held the august office of the Speaker of Punjab assembly March 1962 to March 1964. He served as a Minister of Education, Health and local Self Government in the Council of Ministers of Punjab. He was also a Member of Parliament from 1971 to 1977. He was associated with numerous public and Government bodies in his lifetime.

He died on 8 February 1986.
