= Harbans Lal Gupta =

Indian politician and freedom fighter

Senior Advocate, Supreme Court, India
- In office 1980-2012

Judge, Punjab and Haryana High Court
- In office 1975-1980

Speaker, Punjab Legislative Assembly
- In office 1964-1967

Member of Legislative Assembly for Bathinda
- In office 1952-1967

Minister of State, Punjab
- In office 1952-1957

Personal details
- Born: 1917 or 1918 Bathinda
- Died: 29 November 2013 (aged 95) Chandigarh
- Party: Indian National Congress
- Spouse: Satya Gupta
- Children: 3, including Anupam

Harbans Lal Gupta was an Indian freedom fighter and Indian politician.
