= Baldev Prakash =

Indian politician

Member of Parliament, Lok Sabha
- In office 1977–1980
- Preceded by: Raghunandan Lal Bhatia
- Succeeded by: Raghunandan Lal Bhatia
- Constituency: Amritsar

Minister of Finance in Government of Punjab, India
- In office 1967–1967
- Preceded by: N/A
- Succeeded by: N/A
- Constituency: Amritsar East

Personal details
- Born: 3 February 1908 Bilga, Jullundur District
- Died: 1992
- Party: Bharatiya Janata Party
- Other political affiliations: Bharatiya Jan Sangh; Janata Party
- Spouse: Kamla Shaliwan
- Education: F.Sc. (Medical), L.M.S Government Medical College, Amritsar

Dr. Baldev Prakash (1922 – 1992) was a leader of Bharatiya Janata Party from Punjab, India. He was a member of 6th Lok Sabha elected from Amritsar. He was a member of Punjab Legislative Assembly from 1957 to 1969 and 1974–77 and was president, state unit of Jan Sangh from 1964 to 1974. He served as minister of Finance in Government of Punjab, India in 1967 in Gurnam Singh led cabinet. Baldev Prakash also represented Punjab in Rajya Sabha in 1992. He had studied M.B.B.S.
