= 1957 Punjab Legislative Assembly election =

Elections to the second Punjab Legislative Assembly held in 1957

- 12 December 1957

All 154 seats in the Punjab Legislative Assembly 78 seats needed for a majority
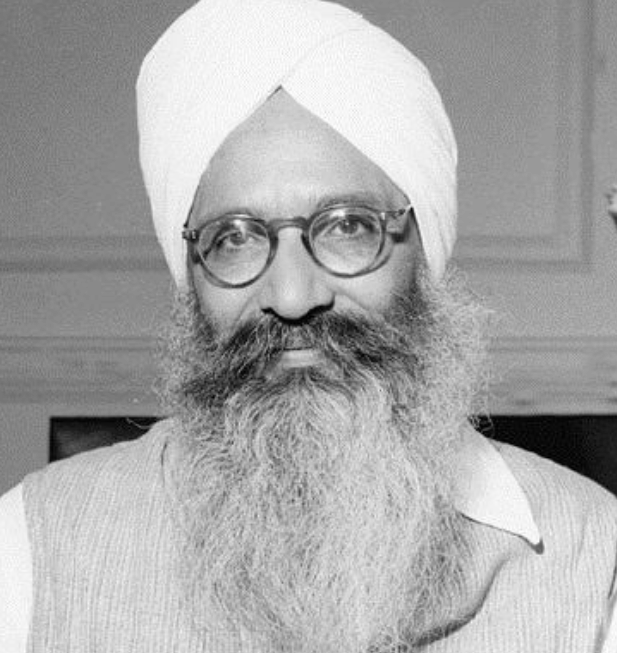
	First party	Second party
		ABJ
Leader	Partap Singh Kairon	-
Party	INC	ABJS
Leader's seat	Sirhali	-
Seats won	120	9
Seat change	▲24	▲9
Popular vote	3,612,709	654,395
Percentage	47.51%	8.61%
Swing	▲10.82	▲3.05
Chief Minister before election
Partap Singh Kairon
INC
Elected Chief Minister
Partap Singh Kairon
INC

Elections to the Second Punjab Legislative Assembly were held in 1957. 661 candidates contested for the 154 seats of the 121 constituencies in the Assembly. There were 21 two-member constituencies and 84 single-member constituencies.

== State Reorganization ==
On 1 November 1956, under States Reorganisation Act, 1956, Patiala & East Punjab States Union was merged with Punjab. Thus the assembly constituencies were increased from 105 with 126 seats in 1952 to 121 with 154 seats in 1957 elections.

== Constituencies ==
After the States Reorganisation Act, 1956, the assembly constituencies were increased from 105 with 126 seats in 1952 to 121 with 154 seats in 1957 elections. 88 constituencies were single member constituencies while 33 were two-member constituencies. Out of 121 constituencies, 33 were reserved for Scheduled Tribes. There were 52,44,907 electors in single member constituencies, while 3,96,40,19 in two-member constituencies. Total 661 candidates were in fray for these 154 seats.

== Political parties ==
Four national parties, Communist Party of India, Congress, Praja Socialist Party and Bharatiya Jana Sangha along with the state party Scheduled Caste Federation took part in the assembly election. Congress was the clear winner in the elections winning 77.92% of the total seats (i.~e. 120 seats) with a vote share of 47.51%. Partap Singh Kairon from the Congress party became the Chief Minister again.

== Results ==
Summary of results of the 1957 Punjab Legislative Assembly election
Political Party	Flag	Seats Contested	Won	Net Change in seats	% of Seats	Votes	Vote %	Change in vote %
Indian National Congress		154	120	▲24	77.92	36,12,709	47.51	▲10.82
Communist Party of India		72	6	▲2	3.90	10,30,898	13.56	▲9.67
Bharatiya Jana Sangh		72	9	▲9	5.84	6,54,395	8.61	▲3.05
Scheduled Caste Federation		24	5	▲5	3.25	4,10,364	5.40	▲3.43
Praja Socialist Party		19	1	New	0.65	94,564	1.24	New
Independent		319	13	▲4	8.44	18,00,960	23.69	N/A
		Total Seats	154 (▲28)	Voters	1,31,72,945	Turnout	76,03,890 (57.72%)	

== Elected members ==
Constituency	Reserved for (SC/None)	Member	Party
Nurpur	None	Ram Chandra	Indian National Congress
Dera Gopipur	None	Mehr Singh	Indian National Congress
Dharamsala	None	Hari Ram	Indian National Congress
Kangra	None	Amar Nath	Indian National Congress
Palampur	None	Partap Singh	Indian National Congress
Kulu	SC	Raghbir Singh	Indian National Congress
Kulu	SC	Jit Ram	Indian National Congress
Hamirpur	SC	Sarla Devi	Indian National Congress
Hamirpur	SC	Rup Singh	Independent
Rupar	SC	Sadhu Singh	Independent
Rupar	SC	Partap Singh	Indian National Congress
Chandigarh	None	Niranjan Singh	Indian National Congress
Simla	None	Muni Lal	Praja Socialist Party
Naraingarh	SC	Sadhu Ram	Indian National Congress
Naraingarh	SC	Roshan Lal	Indian National Congress
Sadhaura	None	Dev Dutt	Indian National Congress
Jagadhri	SC	Amar Nath Vidhalankar	Indian National Congress
Jagadhri	SC	Ram Parkash	Indian National Congress
Ambala Cantonment	None	Dev Raj	Indian National Congress
Ambala City	None	Abdul Gufar Khan	Indian National Congress
Thanesar	SC	Ran Singh	Indian National Congress
Thanesar	SC	Banarsi Das	Indian National Congress
Pehowa	None	Jagdish Chand	Indian National Congress
Pundri	None	Bhag Singh	Scheduled Castes Federation
Rajaund	None	Baru Ram	Independent
Butana	None	Chambel Singh	Indian National Congress
Karnal	None	Ram Piara	Indian National Congress
Gharaunda	None	Multan Singh	Indian National Congress
Panipat	None	Parma Nand	Indian National Congress
Sambhalka	None	Dharam Singh	Independent
Kaithal	None	Om Prabha Jain	Indian National Congress
Jind	SC	Inder Singh	Scheduled Castes Federation
Jind	SC	Bhala Ram	Scheduled Castes Federation
Safidon	None	Shri Krishan	Indian National Congress
Ganaur	None	Lahri Singh	Indian National Congress
Sonepat	None	Shri Ram	Indian National Congress
Gohana	SC	Bharat Singh	Independent
Gohana	SC	Chhajju Ram	Independent
Kalanaur	None	Nahnu Ram	Indian National Congress
Rohtak	None	Mangal Sein	Bharatiya Jana Sangh
Sampla	None	Suraj Bhan	Independent
Rai	None	Hukam Singh	Communist Party of India
Bahadurgarh	None	Siri Chand	Indian National Congress
Jhajjar	SC	Sher Singh	Indian National Congress
Jhajjar	SC	Phul Singh	Communist Party of India
Ferozepur Jhirka	None	Yasin Khan	Indian National Congress
Hassanpur	None	Sumer Singh	Indian National Congress
Palwal	SC	Bhule Ram	Indian National Congress
Palwal	SC	Gurdatt	Indian National Congress
Nuh	None	Abdul Ghani	Indian National Congress
Gurgaon	None	Gajraj Singh	Indian National Congress
Pataudi	None	Mohan Lal	Indian National Congress
Rewari	None	Sumitra Devi	Indian National Congress
Jatusana	None	Abhai Singh	Indian National Congress
Narnaul	None	Devki Nandan	Bharatiya Jana Sangh
Mahendragarh	None	Nihal Singh	Indian National Congress
Dadri	SC	Sis Ram	Bharatiya Jana Sangh
Dadri	SC	Attar Singh	Bharatiya Jana Sangh
Hansi	SC	Dalbir Singh	Indian National Congress
Hansi	SC	Sarup Singh	Indian National Congress
Bhiwani	None	Ram Kanwar	Indian National Congress
Tosham	None	Chander Bhan	Independent
Hissar Sadar	None	Sneh Lata	Indian National Congress
Hissar City	None	Balwant Rai	Indian National Congress
Tohana	None	Suraj Mal	Indian National Congress
Fatehabad	None	Mani Ram S/o Ramjas	Indian National Congress
Sirsa	SC	Ram Dayal	Independent
Sirsa	SC	Kesara Ram	Indian National Congress
Abohar	None	Sahi Ram	Bharatiya Jana Sangh
Fazilka	None	Radha Krishan	Indian National Congress
Malout	SC	Parkash Singh	Indian National Congress
Malout	SC	Teja Singh	Indian National Congress
Guru Har Sahai	None	Bakhtawar Singh	Indian National Congress
Muktsar	None	Harcharan Singh	Indian National Congress
Ferozepur	None	Kundan Lal	Indian National Congress
Zira	ST	Jaswant Kaur	Indian National Congress
Zira	ST	Gurdit Singh	Indian National Congress
Moga	None	Jagraj Singh	Indian National Congress
Baghapurana	ST	Sohan Singh	Indian National Congress
Baghapurana	ST	Gurmit Singh	Indian National Congress
Patti	None	Narain Singh	Indian National Congress
Sirhali	None	Partap Singh	Indian National Congress
Tarn Taran	SC	Gurdial Singh Dhillon	Indian National Congress
Tarn Taran	SC	Naranajan Singh	Indian National Congress
Khalra	None	Gurwaryam Singh	Independent
Ajnala	None	Achhar Singh	Communist Party of India
Majitha	None	Parkash Kaur	Indian National Congress
Amritsar City East	None	Dr. Baldev Prakash	Bharatiya Jana Sangh
Amritsar City West	None	Balram Das Tandon	Bharatiya Jana Sangh
Amritsar City Civil Lines	None	Sarup Singh	Indian National Congress
Amritsar Sadar	SC	Waryam Singh	Indian National Congress
Amritsar Sadar	SC	Charan Singh	Indian National Congress
Beas	None	Sohan Singh	Indian National Congress
Sri Gobindpur	None	Gurbachan Singh	Indian National Congress
Batala	None	Gorakh Nath	Indian National Congress
Fatehgarh	None	Joginder Singh	Indian National Congress
Dera Baba Nanak	None	Waryam Singh	Indian National Congress
Dhariwal	None	Harbans Singh	Indian National Congress
Gurdaspur	SC	Prabodh Chander	Indian National Congress
Gurdaspur	SC	Sunder Singh	Indian National Congress
Pathankot	None	Bhagirath Lal	Indian National Congress
Anandpur	None	Balloo Ram	Indian National Congress
Una	None	Ram Kishan	Communist Party of India
Amb	None	Krishna	Indian National Congress
Garhshankar	SC	Dasonda Singh	Indian National Congress
Garhshankar	SC	Bhag Singh	Communist Party of India
Hoshiarpur	SC	Balbir Singh	Independent
Hoshiarpur	SC	Karam Chand	Scheduled Castes Federation
Dasuya	None	Kartar Singh	Indian National Congress
Mukerian	SC	Guran Dass	Indian National Congress
Mukerian	SC	Ralla Ram	Indian National Congress
Kapurthala	None	Harnam Singh	Indian National Congress
Sultanpur	None	Atama Singh	Indian National Congress
Kartarpur	SC	Gurbanta Singh	Indian National Congress
Kartarpur	SC	Karam Singh	Indian National Congress
Jullundar City North East	None	Lal Chand	Bharatiya Jana Sangh
Jullundar City South West	None	Jagat Narain	Independent
Nakodar	ST	Umrao Singh	Indian National Congress
Nakodar	ST	Sant Ram	Indian National Congress
Nurmahal	None	Darbara Singh	Indian National Congress
Phillaur	None	Udham Singh	Indian National Congress
Phagwara	None	Hans Raj	Indian National Congress
Nawanshahar	SC	Jagat Ram	Indian National Congress
Nawanshahar	SC	Hargurand Singh	Indian National Congress
Samrala	SC	Jagir Singh	Indian National Congress
Samrala	SC	Ajmer Singh	Indian National Congress
Ludhiana City	None	Lajpat Rai	Bharatiya Jana Sangh
Ludhiana North	None	Harbhagwan	Indian National Congress
Ludhiana South	None	Ramdayal Singh	Indian National Congress
Raikot	SC	Wazir Singh	Indian National Congress
Raikot	SC	Bhag Singh	Indian National Congress
Jagraon	None	Har Prakash Kaur	Indian National Congress
Sirhind	SC	Mihan Singh	Indian National Congress
Sirhind	SC	Gain Singh	Indian National Congress
Nabha	None	Balwant Singh	Indian National Congress
Rajpura	None	Prem Singh Prem	Indian National Congress
Patiala	None	Surinder Singh	Indian National Congress
Samana	SC	Bhupinder Singh	Indian National Congress
Samana	SC	Harchand Singh	Indian National Congress
Malerkotla	None	Chanda Singh	Indian National Congress
Dhuri	SC	Jasdev Singh	Indian National Congress
Dhuri	SC	Jangir Singh	Communist Party of India
Barnala	None	Kartar Singh	Indian National Congress
Sangrur	None	Rajinder Singh	Indian National Congress
Sunam	SC	Maheshinder Singh	Independent
Sunam	SC	Pritam Singh	Indian National Congress
Phul	None	Ram Nath	Indian National Congress
Faridkot	None	Mehar Singh	Indian National Congress
Jaitu	None	Jagdish Kaur	Independent
Bhatinda	None	Harbans Lal	Indian National Congress
Pakka Kalan	SC	Dhanna Singh	Indian National Congress
Pakka Kalan	SC	Inder Singh	Indian National Congress
Mansa	SC	Kirpal Singh	Indian National Congress
Mansa	SC	Harcharan Singh	Indian National Congress

== See also ==
- Second Punjab Legislative Assembly
- 1957 elections in India
- 1952 Punjab Legislative Assembly election
