= 1952 Punjab Legislative Assembly election =

Punjab Assembly Election of 1952

1952 Punjab Legislative Assembly Election
- 26 March 1952

All 126 seats in the Punjab Legislative Assembly, 1957 64 seats needed for a majority
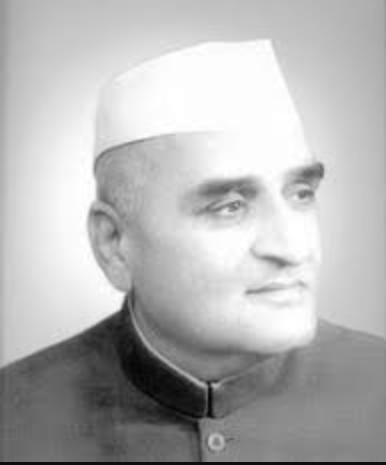

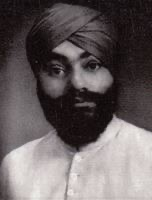
	First party	Second party
Leader	Bhim Sen Sachar	Gopal Singh Khalsa
Party	INC	SAD
Leader's seat	Ludhiana City South	Jagraon
Seats won	96	13
Popular vote	1,830,601	620,455
Percentage	36.69%	12.44%
Chief Minister before election
Bhim Sen Sachar
INC
Chief Minister after election
Bhim Sen Sachar
INC

Indian administrative divisions, as of 1951

Elections to elect the First Punjab Legislative Assembly were held on 26 March 1952. 842 candidates contested for the 105 constituencies in the Assembly. There were 21 two-member constituencies and 84 single-member constituencies.

== Results ==
Summary of results of the 1952 Punjab Legislative Assembly election
Political party	Flag	Seats Contested	Won	% of Seats	Votes	Vote %
Indian National Congress		121	96	76.19	18,30,601	36.69
Shiromani Akali Dal		48	13	10.32	6,20,455	12.44
Zamindar Party		31	2	1.59	3,72,126	7.46
Communist Party of India		26	4	3.17	1,93,974	3.89
Forward Bloc (Marxist Group)		19	1	0.79	69,694	1.40
Lal Communist Party Hind Union		9	1	0.79	57,739	1.16
Independent		446	9	7.14	11,92,896	23.91
Total seats		126	Voters	86,23,498	Turnout	49,89,077 (57.85%)

== Elected members ==
Constituency	Member	Party
Sirsa	Devi Lal	Indian National Congress
Fatehabad	Ganga Ram	Independent
Fatehabad	Dalbir Singh Gohar	Indian National Congress
Hissar City	Balwant Rai	Indian National Congress
Hissar Sadar	Ranjit Singh	Indian National Congress
Hansi	Lajpat Rai	Indian National Congress
Narnaund	Sarup Singh	Indian National Congress
Bhiwani	Mam Raj	Indian National Congress
Bhiwani	Ram Kumar	Indian National Congress
Rai	Rizaq Ram	Indian National Congress
Sonipat	Siri Ram	Indian National Congress
Ganaur	Lehri Singh	Indian National Congress
Gohana	Nanhu Ram	Indian National Congress
Gohana	Mam Chand	Indian National Congress
Kalanaur	Badlu Ram	Indian National Congress
Jhajjar	Sher Singh	Indian National Congress
Jhajjar	Chand Ram	Indian National Congress
Rohtak City	Dev Raj	Indian National Congress
Ferozepore Jhirka	Yasin Khan	Indian National Congress
Nuh	Abdul Ghani	Indian National Congress
Palwal	Gurditta	Indian National Congress
Hassanpur	Dharam Vir	Indian National Congress
Rewari	Chuni Lal	Indian National Congress
Rewari	Abhai Singh	Indian National Congress
Ballab Garh	Kidar Nath Sehgal	Indian National Congress
Gurgaon	Gajraj Singh	Indian National Congress
Sohna	Babu Dayal	Indian National Congress
Sambhalka	Mool Chand	Indian National Congress
Panipat	Krishan Gopal Datt	Indian National Congress
Karnal	Nand Lal	Indian National Congress
Asandh	Kasturi Lal	Indian National Congress
Gharaunda	Samar Singh	Indian National Congress
Butana	Ram Sarup	Indian National Congress
Butana	Phaggu Ram	Indian National Congress
Thanesar	Benarsi Das	Indian National Congress
Shahabad	Jagdish Chand	Indian National Congress
Kaithal	Daulat Ram	Indian National Congress
Pundri	Gopi Chand	Indian National Congress
Jagadhri	Dev Datt	Indian National Congress
Molana	Rattan Amol Singh	Indian National Congress
Molana	Ram Parkash	Independent
Ambala City	Abdul Gaffar Khan	Indian National Congress
Ambala Cantt	Dev Raj	Indian National Congress
Narain Garh	Sadhu Ram	Indian National Congress
Chandi Garh	Jagat Narain	Indian National Congress
Rupar	Raijinder Singh	Indian National Congress
Rupar	Partap Singh	Shiromani Akali Dal
Simla	Som Datt	Indian National Congress
Nurpur	Ram Chand	Indian National Congress
Dharamsala	Hari Ram	Indian National Congress
Haripur	Bhagat Ram	Indian National Congress
Palampur	Kanaya Lal	Indian National Congress
Sujanpur	Pratap Singh	Indian National Congress
Kulu	Lal Chand	Independent
Seraj	Raghubir Singh	Independent
Hamirpur	Daulat Ram	Indian National Congress
Hamirpur	Mehr Singh	Indian National Congress
Dasuya	Hari Singh	Indian National Congress
Mukerian	Ralla Ram	Indian National Congress
Amb	Khushiram	Indian National Congress
Una	Mansa Ram	Indian National Congress
Balachar	Baloo Ram	Indian National Congress
Mahilpur	Harbhajan Singh Bains	Indian National Congress
garhshankar	Kartar Singh	Indian National Congress
Hoshiarpur	Jagat Ram	Indian National Congress
Hoshiarpur	Guran Dass	Indian National Congress
Nawanshehr	Bishna	Indian National Congress
Nawanshehr	Gurbachan Singh	Indian National Congress
Phillaur	Niranjan Dass	Indian National Congress
Nurmahal	Darbara Singh	Indian National Congress
Nakodar	Sant Ram	Indian National Congress
Nakodar	Swaran Singh	Indian National Congress
Adampur	Gurbanta Singh	Indian National Congress
Adampur	Mota Singh	Indian National Congress
Kartarpur	Gurdial Singh	Indian National Congress
Jullundur City North West	Ram Kishan	Indian National Congress
Jullundur City South East	Sita Devi	Indian National Congress
Samrala	Naurang Singh	Shiromani Akali Dal
Samrala	Ajmer Singh	Shiromani Akali Dal
Ludhiana City North	Jagdish Chander	Indian National Congress
Ludhiana City South	Bhim Sen Sachar	Indian National Congress
Jagraon	Iqbal Singh	Shiromani Akali Dal
Jagraon	Gopal Singh	Shiromani Akali Dal
Ludhiana Sadar	Shamsher Singh	Independent
Moga Dharmkot	Mukhtair Singh	Shiromani Akali Dal
Moga Dharmkot	Davinder Singh	Shiromani Akali Dal
Khuian Sarwar	Teg Ram	Indian National Congress
Abohar	Chandi Ram	Indian National Congress
Mallanwala	Partap Singh	Independent
Ferozepore	Harnam Singh	Indian National Congress
Guru Har Sahai	Partap Singh	Independent
Kot Bhai	Puran Singh	Shiromani Akali Dal
Kot Bhai	Bhag Singh	Shiromani Akali Dal
Fazilka	Wadhawa Ram	Independent
Ramdas	Parkash Kaur	Indian National Congress
Amritsar	Waryam Singh	Indian National Congress
Amritsar	Khem Singh	Indian National Congress
Amritsar City North	Satya Pal	Indian National Congress
Amritsar City Central	Amir Chand Gupta	Indian National Congress
Amritsar City West	Shanoo Devi	Indian National Congress
Jhabal	Gurdial Singh	Indian National Congress
Khalra	Balwant Singh	Indian National Congress
Patti	Partap Singh	Indian National Congress
Tarn Tarn	Mohan Singh	Indian National Congress
Tarn Tarn	Darshan Singh	Communist Party of India
Beas	Sohan Singh	Indian National Congress
Dera Baba Nanak	Joginder Singh	Indian National Congress
Serah	Waryam Singh	Indian National Congress
Batala	Gurbachan Singh	Indian National Congress
Sri Gobind Pur	Uttam Singh	Indian National Congress
Rania	Shiv Singh	Indian National Congress
Gurdas Pur	Sunder Singh	Indian National Congress
Gurdas Pur	Parbodh Chandra	Indian National Congress
Narot Jaimal Singh	Gorakh Nath	Indian National Congress
Pathankot	Kesho Dass	Independent

== State Reorganization ==
On 1 November 1956, under States Reorganisation Act, 1956, Patiala & East Punjab States Union was merged with Punjab. Thus the assembly constituencies were increased from 105 with 126 seats in 1952 to 121 with 154 seats in 1957 elections.

== See also ==
- PEPSU state Legislative Assembly elections, 1952
- First Punjab Legislative Assembly
- 1951–52 elections in India
- 1957 Punjab Legislative Assembly election
