= 1962 Punjab Legislative Assembly election =

- 19 February 1962

All 154 seats in the Punjab Legislative Assembly, 78 seats needed for a majority
- Turnout: 63.44%
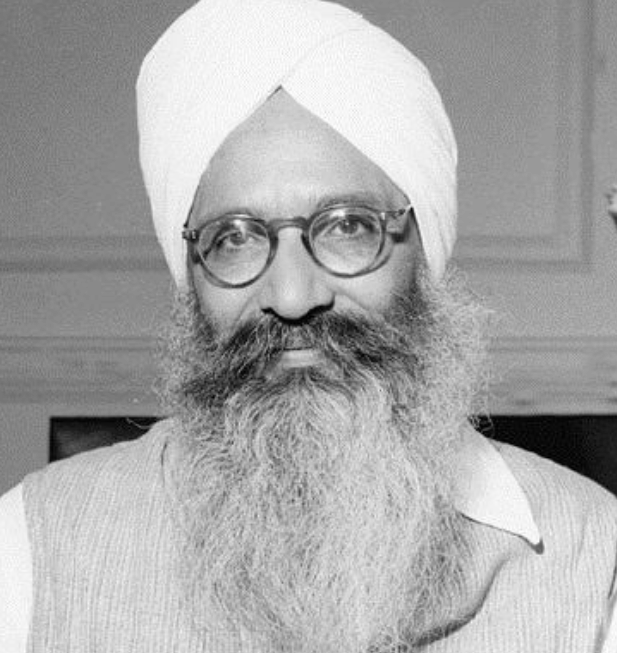

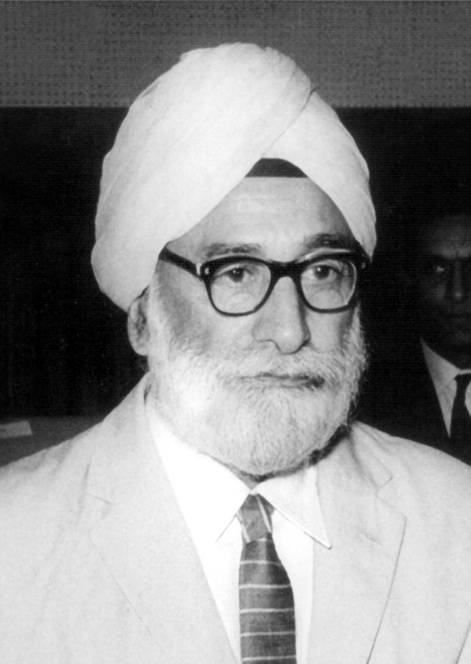

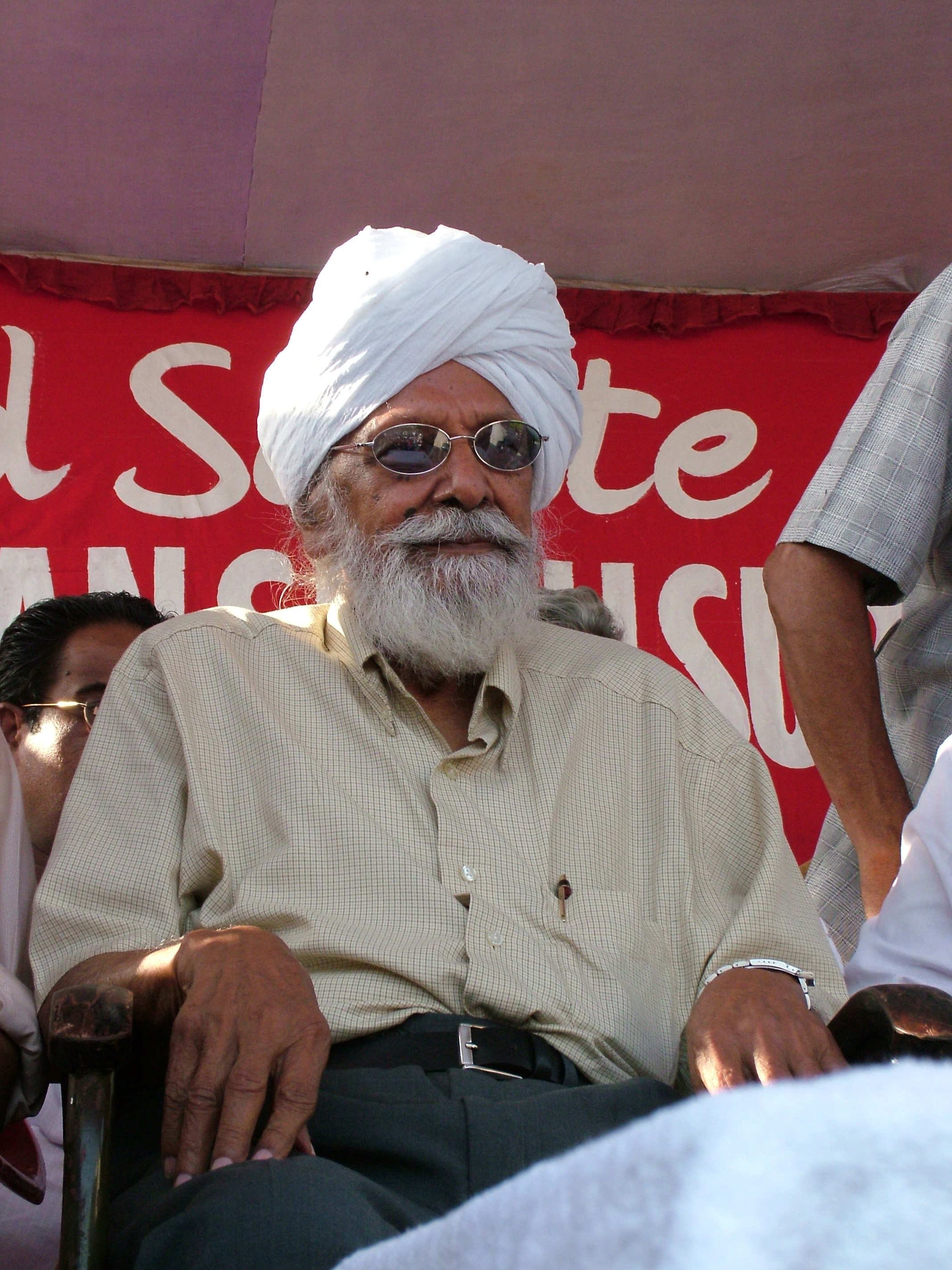
	First party	Second party	Third party
Leader	Partap Singh Kairon	Gurnam Singh	Harkishan Singh Surjeet
Party	INC	SAD	CPI
Leader's seat	Sarhali	Raikot	Did not Contest
Seats won	90	16	12
Seat change	▼30	▲16	▲4
Popular vote	2,946,209	799,925	478,333
Percentage	43.72%	11.87%	7.10
Swing	▼3.79%	▲11.87%	▼6.46%
CM before election
Partap Singh Kairon
INC
Elected CM
Partap Singh Kairon
INC

Elections for the Third Punjab Legislative Assembly were held in February 1962 in the Indian state of Punjab. A total of 756 candidates contested for the 154 seats. The Indian National Congress won the election with 90 seats.

== Result ==
Party	Contestants	Seats won	Popular vote	%
Indian National Congress	154	90	29,46,209	43.72
Shiromani Akali Dal	46	16	7,99,925	11.87
Bharatiya Jana Sangh	80	8	6,55,160	9.72
Communist Party of India	47	12	4,78,333	7.10
Socialist Party	8	4	93,801	1.39
Swatantra Party	42	3	2,61,276	3.88
Haryana Lok Samiti	8	3	1,29,036	1.91
Independents	330	18	11,57,113	17.17
Others	41	0	2,18,370	3.24
Total	756	154	67,39,223	

== Elected members ==
Constituency	Reserved for (SC/None)	Member	Party
Kulu	None	Lal Chand	Independent
Seraj	SC	Bansi Ram	Independent
Palampur	None	Pratap Singh	Indian National Congress
Kangra	None	Amar Nath	Indian National Congress
Dharamsala	None	Hari Ram	Indian National Congress
Nurpur	None	Ram Chandra	Indian National Congress
Dera Gopipur	None	Mehar Singh	Indian National Congress
Hamirpur	SC	Rup Singh Phul	Indian National Congress
Barsar	None	Sarla Devi F Inc Dasondhi Ram	Independent
Nalagarh	None	(sc)1. Rupar Shamsher Singh	Communist Party of India
Morinda	SC	Ajaib Singh	Akali Dal
Chandigarh	None	Narinjan Singh Talib	Indian National Congress
Naraingarh	None	Jagjit Singh	Independent
Sadhaura	None	Gulab Singh	Indian National Congress
Jagadhri	None	Shanno Devi	Indian National Congress
Molana	SC	Ram Parkash	Indian National Congress
Ambala Cantonment	None	Dev Raj	Indian National Congress
Ambala City	None	Abdul Ghaffar Khan	Indian National Congress
Simla	None	Gian Chand	Indian National Congress
Thanesar	None	Benarsi Dass	Indian National Congress
Radaur	SC	Ran Singh	Indian National Congress
Karnal	None	Ram Piara	Indian National Congress
Butana	None	Maltan Singh	Indian National Congress
Pehowa	None	Pyara Singh	Indian National Congress
Kaithal	None	Om Prabha	Indian National Congress
Narwana	SC	Fakiria	Swatantra Party
Rajaund	None	Parasanni Devi	Indian National Congress
Jind	None	Ram Singh	Swatantra Party
Safidon	None	Inder Singh	Independent
Pundri	None	Ram Pal Singh	Independent
Gharaunda	None	Rulya Ram	Swatantra Party
Panipat	None	Fateh Chand	Jan Sangh
Sambhalka	None	Chuhar Singh	Indian National Congress
Ganaur	None	Chiranji Lal	Independent
Sonepat	None	Mukhtiar Singh	Jan Sangh
Rai	None	Rizaq Ram	Indian National Congress
Bahadurgarh	None	Hardwari Lal	Indian National Congress
Sampla	None	Ram Sarup	Hariyana Lok Samiti
Rohtak	None	Mangal Sein	Jan Sangh
Gohana	None	Ram Dhari	Hariyana Lok Samiti
Meham	SC	Ram Dhari	Hariyana Lok Samiti
Kalanaur	None	Ranbir Singh	Indian National Congress
Jhajjar	None	Bhagwat Dayal	Indian National Congress
Salhawas	SC	Chand Ram	Indian National Congress
Gurgaon	None	Kanihya Lal	Indian National Congress
Ballabgarh	SC	Hira Lal	Indian National Congress
Palwal	None	Roop Lal	Indian National Congress
Hasanpur	None	Har Kishan	Independent
Ferozepur Jhirka	None	Tayyab Husain	Indian National Congress
Nuh	None	Khurshid Ahmed	Indian National Congress
Pataudi	None	Babu Dayal	Indian National Congress
Rewari	None	Sumitra Devi	Indian National Congress
Jatusana	None	Nihal Singh	Independent
Kanina	SC	Banwari Lal	Jan Sangh
Narnaul	None	Ramsaran Chand Mittal	Indian National Congress
Mahendragarh	None	Nihal Singh	Indian National Congress
Dadri	None	Chandrawati	Indian National Congress
Bhiwani	None	Sagar Ram	Indian National Congress
Tosham	None	Jagan Nath	Independent
Hissar Sadar	None	Net Ram	Socialist Party
Hansi	None	Tek Ram	Socialist Party
Narnaund	SC	Amar Singh	Independent
Hissar City	None	Honna Mal	Socialist Party
Tohana	None	Manphul Singh	Socialist Party
Fatehabad	None	Devi Lal	Independent
Sirsa	None	Sita Ram	Indian National Congress
Dabwali	SC	Kesara Ram	Indian National Congress
Pakka Kalan	SC	Hardit Singh	Akali Dal
Talwandi Sabo	None	Jangir Singh	Communist Party of India
Mansa	None	Surjit Singh	Akali Dal
Budhlada	SC	Tej Singh	Akali Dal
Phul	None	Babu Singh	Communist Party of India
Bhatinda	None	Harbans Lal	Indian National Congress
Jaitu	None	Tirlochan Singh	Indian National Congress
Faridkot	None	Zail Singh	Indian National Congress
Muktsar	None	Harcharan Singh	Indian National Congress
Malout	None	Gurmit Singh	Indian National Congress
Lambi	SC	Ujagar Singh	Indian National Congress
Abohar	None	Chandi Ram	Indian National Congress
Fazilka	None	Sat Dev	Jan Sangh
Guru Har Sahai	None	Jaswant Singh	Independent
Ferozepur	None	Kulbir Singh	Jan Sangh
Zira	None	Jagjit Singh	Akali Dal
Dharamkot	SC	Kultar Singh	Akali Dal
Moga	None	Gurcharan Singh	Akali Dal
Baghapurana	SC	Deedar Singh	Communist Party of India
Nihal Singh Wala	None	Gurbux Singh	Communist Party of India
Jagraon	None	Lachhman Singh	Akali Dal
Sidhwan Bet	SC	Ajit Kumar	Akali Dal
Raikot	None	Gurnam Singh	Akali Dal
Ludhiana South	None	Shamsher Singh	Akali Dal
Ludhiana City	None	Dina Nath	Indian National Congress
Ludhiana North	None	Bachan Singh	Independent
Khanna	SC	Jagir Singh	Indian National Congress
Samrala	None	Ajmer Singh	Indian National Congress
Nawanshahr	SC	Jagat Ram	Indian National Congress
Banga	None	Dilbagh Singh	Indian National Congress
Phagwara	None	Om Parkash	Independent
Phillaur	None	Hari Singh	Independent
Nurmahal	None	Darbara Singh	Indian National Congress
Nakodar	None	Darshan Singh	Indian National Congress
Shahkot	SC	Dalip Singh	Akali Dal
Jullundur Cantonment	None	Karam Singh Kirti	Indian National Congress
Jullundur City South West	None	Yash Paul	Indian National Congress
Jullundur City North East	None	Ram Kishan	Indian National Congress
Kartarpur	SC	Gurbanta Singh	Indian National Congress
Kapurthala	None	Lakhi Singh	Akali Dal
Sultanpur	None	Balwant Singh S/o Sunder Singh	Indian National Congress
Sarhali	None	Partap Singh	Indian National Congress
P A T T I	None	Hazara Singh	Akali Dal
Khalra	None	Narain Singh	Indian National Congress
Tarn Taran	None	Gurdial Singh	Indian National Congress
Nagoke	SC	Tara Singh	Akali Dal
Jandiala	None	Makhan Singh	Communist Party of India
Amritsar City East	None	Baldev Parkash	Jan Sangh
Amritsar City Civil Lines	None	Jai Inder Singh	Indian National Congress
Amritsar City West	None	Balramji Das	Jan Sangh
Ajnala	None	Harindar Singh	Indian National Congress
Majitha	None	Parkash Kaur	Indian National Congress
Amritsar Sadar	SC	Gurmej Singh	Indian National Congress
Beas	None	Kartar Singh	Independent
Sri Gobindpur	None	Satnam Singh	Indian National Congress
Batala	None	Mohan Lal	Indian National Congress
Fatehgarh	None	Gurmej Singh	Akali Dal
Dera Baba Nanak	None	Makhan Singh	Akali Dal
Dhariwal	None	Gurbaksh Singh	Akali Dal
Narot Jaimal Singh	SC	Sunder Singh	Indian National Congress
Pathankot	None	Bhagirath Lal	Indian National Congress
Gurdaspur	None	Prabodh Chandra	Indian National Congress
Mukerian	None	Rala Ram	Indian National Congress
Dasuya	None	Kartar Singh	Indian National Congress
Hariana	SC	Bhagat Guran Dass	Indian National Congress
Hoshiarpur	None	Bal Krishan	Indian National Congress
Jahankhelan	SC	Ram Rattan	Indian National Congress
Amb	None	Mohan Lal	Independent
Una	None	Surinder Nath	Indian National Congress
Mahilpur	SC	Gurmail	Indian National Congress
Garhshankar	None	Rattan Singh	Indian National Congress
Anandpur	None	Baloo Ram	Indian National Congress
Rajpura	None	Prem Singh	Indian National Congress
Raipur	None	Jasdev Singh	Indian National Congress
Samana	SC	Harchand Singh	Indian National Congress
Patiala	None	Ram Partap	Indian National Congress
Nabha	None	Gurdarshan Singh	Indian National Congress
Sirhind	None	Gian Singh	Indian National Congress
Payal	SC	Bhag Singh	Indian National Congress
Malerkotla	None	Yusuf Zaman Begum	Indian National Congress
Mahal Kalan	None	Harnam Singh	Communist Party of India
Barnala	None	Gurbakshish Singh	Akali Dal
Dhuri	SC	Bhan Singh	Communist Party of India
Sangrur	None	Hardit Singh	Communist Party of India
Sunam	None	Brish Bhan	Indian National Congress
Lehra	SC	Pritam Singh	Indian National Congress

== See also ==
Third Punjab Legislative Assembly

Elections in Punjab
