= Punjab Legislative Assembly =

Legislature of Punjab, India

Punjab Legislative Assembly Punjab Vidhan Sabha
- 16th Punjab Assembly

Type
- Type: Unicameral
- Term limits: None

History
- Founded: 3 May 1952 (74 years ago)
- Preceded by: Interim East Punjab Assembly

Leadership
- Speaker: Kultar Singh Sandhwan, AAP since 21 March 2022
- Deputy Speaker: Jai Krishan, AAP since 30 June 2022
- Leader of the House (Chief Minister): Bhagwant Mann, AAP since 16 March 2022
- Deputy Leader of the House: Harpal Singh Cheema, AAP since 21 March 2022
- Minister of Legislative Affairs: Ravjot Singh, AAP since 23 September 2024
- Leader of the Opposition: Partap Singh Bajwa, INC since 9 April 2022
- Deputy Leader of Opposition: Aruna Chaudhary, INC since 3 September 2024

Structure
- Seats: 117
- Political groups: Government (95): AAP (95) (Note: One of the AAP MLA, Kuwar Vijay Partap Singh is suspended by Party from his anti-party activities. Thus he is not bound by the decisions of the legislative party in assembly, however, officially he is still the member of the Aam Aadmi Party as his party affiliation is yet to be decided by the speaker.); Official Opposition (16): INC (16) (Note: Two members were suspended by congress because of their anti-party activities. These are Sandeep Jakhar and Vikramjit Chaudhary, thus they are not bound by the decisions of the legislative party in assembly, however, officially they are still member of the congress as their party affiliation is yet to be decided by the speaker.); Other Opposition (10): BJP (2); SAD (1) (Note: One of the three SAD MLAs, Sukhwinder Sukhi from Banga, joined AAP on 14 August 2024. As per Anti-defection law his membership will be decided by Speaker of Punjab Assembly. Furthermore, Manpreet Singh Ayali, MLA for Dakha, officially joined the Akali Dal (Waris Punjab De) in June 2026, but for purposes of party affiliation has opted to officially remain in the SAD caucus as the AD(WPD) is not a recognized and registered political party.); AD(WPD) (1); BSP (1); IND (1)
- Committees: Agriculture Co-operation; Estimates; Government Assurances; Local Bodies; Panchayati Raj Institutions; Papers laid/to be laid on the table and Library; Petitions; Privileges; Public Undertakings; Questions & References; Subordinate Legislation; Welfare of Scheduled Castes, Scheduled Tribes and Backward Classes House Committee
- Length of term: 5 years; renewable

Elections
- Voting system: First-past-the-post
- First election: 26 March 1952
- Last election: 20 February 2022
- Next election: 2027

Meeting place
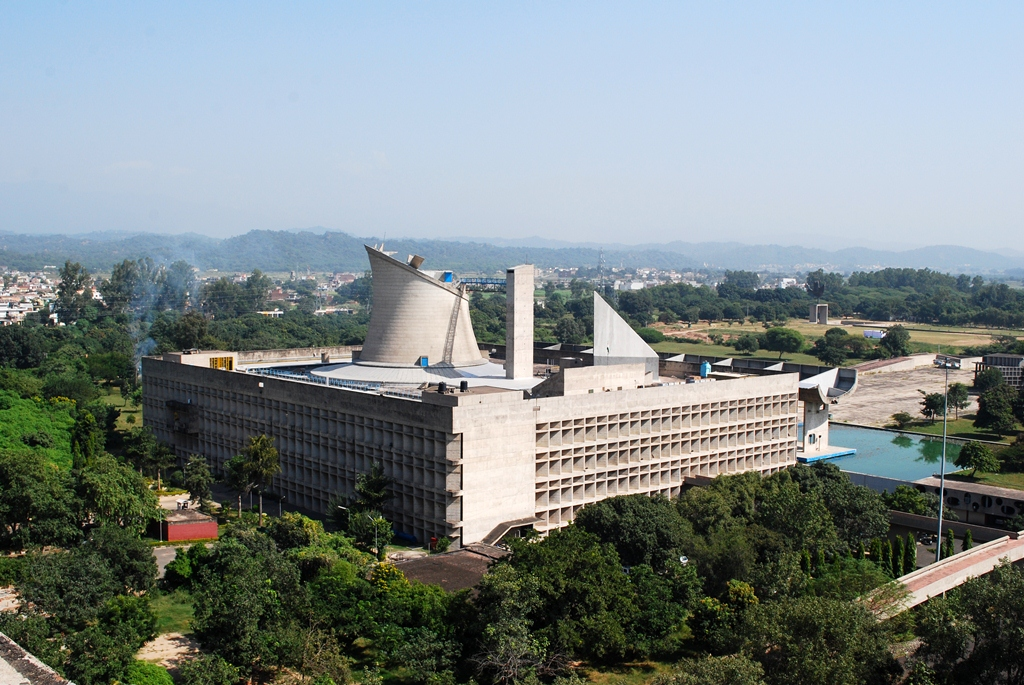
- Palace of Assembly, Chandigarh, India

Website
- Punjab Legislative Assembly

Constitution
- Constitution of India

The Punjab Legislative Assembly or the Punjab Vidhan Sabha is the unicameral legislature of the state of Punjab in India. The Sixteenth Punjab Legislative Assembly was constituted in March 2022. At present, it consists of 117 members, directly elected from 117 single-seat constituencies. The tenure of the Legislative Assembly is five years unless dissolved sooner. The Speaker of the sixteenth assembly is Kultar Singh Sandhwan. The meeting place of the Legislative Assembly since 6 March 1961 is the Vidhan Bhavan in Chandigarh.

== History ==
In the British Raj, an Executive Council was formed under The Indian Councils Act, 1861. It was only under the Government of India Act 1919 that a Legislative Council was set up in Punjab. Later, under the Government of India Act 1935, the Punjab Legislative Assembly was constituted with a membership of 175. It was summoned for the first time on 1 April 1937. In 1947, Punjab Province was partitioned into West Punjab and East Punjab and the 79-member East Punjab Legislative Assembly was formed, the forerunner of the current assembly.

After the independence of India, on 15 July 1948, eight princely states of East Punjab grouped together to form a single state, Patiala and East Punjab States Union. The Punjab State Legislature was a bicameral house in April 1952, comprising the Vidhan Sabha (lower house) and Vidhan Parishad (upper house). In 1956 that state was largely merged into Punjab, the strength of the Vidhan Parishad of the new State of Punjab was enhanced from 40 seats to 46 seats and in 1957, it was increased to 51. Punjab was trifurcated in 1966 to form Haryana, Himachal Pradesh, and Punjab. The Vidhan Parishad was reduced to 40 seats and the Vidhan Sabha grew by 50 seats to 104 seats. On 1 January 1970, the Vidhan Parishad was abolished leaving the state with a unicameral legislature.

== Legislature ==
The legislature comprises the governor and the Punjab Legislative Assembly, which is the highest political organ in the state. The governor has the power to summon the assembly or to close the same. All members of the legislative assembly are directly elected, normally once in every five years by the eligible voters who are above 18 years of age. The current assembly consists of 117 elected members. The elected members select one of its own members as its chairperson who is called the speaker of the assembly. The speaker is assisted by the deputy speaker who is also elected by the members. The conduct of a meeting in the house is the responsibility of the speaker.

The main function of the assembly is to pass laws and rules. Every bill passed by the house has to be finally approved by the governor before it becomes applicable.

The normal term of the legislative assembly is five years from the date appointed for its first meeting.

== Sixteenth Assembly ==
In the Sixteenth Punjab Legislative Assembly, 94 members of the ruling Aam Aadmi Party form the treasury benches. The main opposition party in the assembly is Indian National Congress with 14 seats. The other parties which are in opposition are the Shiromani Akali Dal, the Bharatiya Janata Party, the Bahujan Samaj Party and independents. AAP MLA, Kultar Singh Sandhwan was announced as the speaker of the assembly.

Incumbent Chief Minister Bhagwant Mann took the oath of office on 16 March at Khatkar Kalan, the ancestral village of Bhagat Singh. Inderbir Singh Nijjar took the oath as pro tem Speaker. On 17 March Nijjar administered the oath of office to all the 117 legislators of the Sixteenth Punjab Legislative assembly. Other 10 cabinet ministers of the Mann ministry, took oath on 19 March.

On 22 June 2022, Speaker Kultar Singh Sandhwan announced that the legislators will get answers on all issues that they raise during the Assembly debates. The answers would be provided during the Zero Hour. This was done for the first time in the history of Punjab Assembly.

== Leaders ==
Title	Name	Portrait	Since
Constitutional Posts
Governor	Gulab Chand Kataria		30 July 2024
Speaker	Kultar Singh Sandhwan		21 March 2022
Deputy speaker	Jai Krishan Singh		30 June 2022
Leader of the House (Chief Minister)	Bhagwant Mann		16 March 2022
Leader of Opposition	Pratap Singh Bajwa		9 April 2022
Political posts
Leader of AAP legislature party	Bhagwant Mann		16 March 2022
Leader of INC legislature party	Pratap Singh Bajwa		9 April 2022
Leader of SAD legislature party	Ganieve Kaur Majithia		June 2026
Leader of AD (WPD) legislature party	Manpreet Singh Ayali		April 2022
Leader of BJP legislature party	Ashwani Kumar Sharma		April 2022
Leader of BSP legislature party	Nachhatar Pal		April 2022

== Committees ==
List of committees and chairpersons for the term 2022–2023.

Committee	Chairperson	Party or Organization
Committee on Local Bodies	Jagroop Singh Gill	Aam Aadmi Party
Committee on Public Accounts	Sukhbinder Singh Sarkaria	Indian National Congress
Committee on Estimates	Aman Arora	Aam Aadmi Party
Committee on Public Undertakings	Budh Ram	Aam Aadmi Party
Committee on Welfare of Scheduled Castes, Scheduled Tribes and Backward Classes	Manjit Singh Bilaspur	Aam Aadmi Party
Committee on Privileges	Kulwant Singh Pandori	Aam Aadmi Party
Committee on Government Assurances	Kunwar Vijay Pratap Singh	Aam Aadmi Party
Committee on Local Bodies	Jagroop Singh Gill	Aam Aadmi Party
Committee on Panchayati Raj Institutions	Gurmeet Singh Khudian	Aam Aadmi Party
Committee on Subordinate Legislation	Barinder Kumar Goyal Vakeel	Aam Aadmi Party
Committee on Papers Laid/to be Laid on the Table and Library	Jagdeep Kamboj Goldy	Aam Aadmi Party
Committee on Petitions	Mohammad Jamil Ur Rahman	Aam Aadmi Party
House Committee	Jai Krishan Singh; Deputy speaker (Ex-Officio Chairperson)	Aam Aadmi Party
Committee on Questions & References	Baljinder Kaur	Aam Aadmi Party
Press Gallery Committee	Naresh Sharma	Punjab Kesari
Committee on Co-operation and its allied activities	Sarvjit Kaur Manuke	Aam Aadmi Party
Committee on Agriculture and its allied activities	Gurpreet Singh Banawali	Aam Aadmi Party

== Composition ==
Seat Share
1. AAP - 94 (80.8%)
2. INC - 16 (13.9%)
3. SAD - 2 (1.80%)
4. BJP - 2 (1.80%)
5. BSP - 1 (0.90%)
6. IND - 1 (0.90%)

=== By alliance and party ===
Party	Seats		Legislative Party Leader	Bench	
Party	Won	Change (Note: As compare with previous result of 2017)	Legislative Party Leader	Bench	
AAP	92	▲72	Bhagwant Singh Mann	94	Government
INC	18	▼59	Partap Singh Bajwa	16	Main Opposition
SAD	3	▼12	Manpreet Singh Ayali	7	Other Opposition
BJP	2	▼1	Ashwani Kumar Sharma	7	Other Opposition
BSP	1	▲1	Nachhatar Pal	7	Other Opposition
IND	1	▲1	Rana Inder Partap Singh	7	Other Opposition
Total	117			117	

=== By constituency ===
District	No.	Constituency	Name	Party	Remarks
Pathankot	1	Sujanpur	Naresh Puri	INC	
Pathankot	2	Bhoa (SC)	Lal Chand Kataruchakk	AAP	
Pathankot	3	Pathankot	Ashwani Kumar Sharma	BJP	
Gurdaspur	4	Gurdaspur	Barindermeet Singh Pahra	INC	
Gurdaspur	5	Dina Nagar (SC)	Aruna Chaudhary	INC	Dy. Leader of Opposition
Gurdaspur	6	Qadian	Partap Singh Bajwa	INC	Leader of the Opposition
Gurdaspur	7	Batala	Amansher Singh (Shery Kalsi)	AAP	
Gurdaspur	8	Sri Hargobindpur (SC)	Amarpal Singh	AAP	
Gurdaspur	9	Fatehgarh Churian	Tripat Rajinder Singh Bajwa	INC	
Gurdaspur	10	Dera Baba Nanak	Sukhjinder Singh Randhawa	INC	Elected to 18th Lok Sabha in June 2024
Gurdaspur	10	Dera Baba Nanak	Gurdeep Singh Randhawa	AAP	
Amritsar	11	Ajnala	Kuldip Singh Dhaliwal	AAP	
Amritsar	12	Rajasansi	Sukhbinder Singh Sarkaria	INC	
Amritsar	13	Majitha	Ganieve Kaur Majithia	SAD	
Amritsar	14	Jandiala (SC)	Harbhajan Singh E.T.O.	AAP	
Amritsar	15	Amritsar North	Kunwar Vijay Pratap Singh	AAP	
Amritsar	16	Amritsar West (SC)	Jasbir Singh Sandhu	AAP	
Amritsar	17	Amritsar Central	Ajay Gupta	AAP	
Amritsar	18	Amritsar East	Jeevan Jyot Kaur	AAP	
Amritsar	19	Amritsar South	Inderbir Singh Nijjar	AAP	
Amritsar	20	Attari (SC)	Jaswinder Singh	AAP	
Tarn Taran	21	Tarn Taran	Harmeet Singh Sandhu	AAP	
Tarn Taran	22	Khemkaran	Sarvan Singh Dhun	AAP	
Tarn Taran	23	Patti	Laljit Singh Bhullar	AAP	
Tarn Taran	24	Khadoor Sahib	Manjinder Singh Lalpura	AAP	
Amritsar	25	Baba Bakala (SC)	Dalbir Singh Tong	AAP	
Kapurthala	26	Bholath	Sukhpal Singh Khaira	INC	
Kapurthala	27	Kapurthala	Rana Gurjeet Singh	INC	
Kapurthala	28	Sultanpur Lodhi	Rana Inder Pratap Singh	IND	
Kapurthala	29	Phagwara (SC)	Balwinder Singh Dhaliwal	INC	
Jalandhar	30	Phillaur (SC)	Vikramjit Singh Chaudhary	INC	
Jalandhar	30	Phillaur (SC)	Vikramjit Singh Chaudhary	IND	Suspended by INC in April 2024.
Jalandhar	31	Nakodar	Inderjit Kaur Mann	AAP	
Jalandhar	32	Shahkot	Hardev Singh Laddi	INC	
Jalandhar	33	Kartarpur (SC)	Balkar Singh	AAP	
Jalandhar	34	Jalandhar West (SC)	Sheetal Angural	AAP	
Jalandhar	34	Jalandhar West (SC)	Mohinder Pal Bhagat	AAP	
Jalandhar	35	Jalandhar Central	Raman Arora	AAP	
Jalandhar	36	Jalandhar North	Avtar Singh Junior	INC	
Jalandhar	37	Jalandhar Cantonment	Pargat Singh	INC	
Jalandhar	38	Adampur (SC)	Sukhwinder Singh Kotli	INC	
Hoshiarpur	39	Mukerian	Jangi Lal Mahajan	BJP	
Hoshiarpur	40	Dasuya	Karambir Singh Ghuman	AAP	
Hoshiarpur	41	Urmar	Jasvir Singh Raja Gill	AAP	
Hoshiarpur	42	Sham Chaurasi (SC)	Ravjot Singh	AAP	Minister of Legislative Affairs
Hoshiarpur	43	Hoshiarpur	Bram Shanker	AAP	
Hoshiarpur	44	Chabbewal (SC)	Raj Kumar Chabbewal	INC	Elected to 18th Lok Sabha in June 2024
Hoshiarpur	44	Chabbewal (SC)	Ishank Kumar	AAP	
Hoshiarpur	45	Garhshankar	Jai Krishan Singh	AAP	Dy. Speaker
Shaheed Bhagat Singh Nagar	46	Banga (SC)	Sukhwinder Kumar	AAP	Defected from SAD to AAP
Shaheed Bhagat Singh Nagar	47	Nawan Shahr	Nachhatar Pal	BSP	
Shaheed Bhagat Singh Nagar	48	Balachaur	Santosh Katariaa	AAP	
Rupnagar	49	Anandpur Sahib	Harjot Singh Bains	AAP	
Rupnagar	50	Rupnagar	Dinesh Chadha	AAP	
Rupnagar	51	Chamkaur Sahib (SC)	Dr Charanjit Singh	AAP	
Sahibzada Ajit Singh Nagar	52	Kharar	Anmol Gagan Maan	AAP	
Sahibzada Ajit Singh Nagar	53	S.A.S. Nagar	Kulwant Singh	AAP	
Fatehgarh Sahib	54	Bassi Pathana (SC)	Rupinder Singh	AAP	
Fatehgarh Sahib	55	Fatehgarh Sahib	Lakhbir Singh Rai	AAP	
Fatehgarh Sahib	56	Amloh	Gurinder Singh Garry	AAP	
Ludhiana	57	Khanna	Tarunpreet Singh Sond	AAP	
Ludhiana	58	Samrala	Jagtar Singh	AAP	
Ludhiana	59	Sahnewal	Hardeep Singh Mundian	AAP	
Ludhiana	60	Ludhiana East	Daljit Singh Grewal	AAP	
Ludhiana	61	Ludhiana South	Rajinder Pal Kaur Chhina	AAP	
Ludhiana	62	Atam Nagar	Kulwant Singh Sidhu	AAP	
Ludhiana	63	Ludhiana Central	Ashok Prashar Pappi	AAP	
Ludhiana	64	Ludhiana West	Sanjeev Arora	AAP	
Ludhiana	65	Ludhiana North	Madan Lal Bagga	AAP	
Ludhiana	66	Gill (SC)	Jiwan Singh Sangowal	AAP	
Ludhiana	67	Payal (SC)	Manwinder Singh Gyaspura	AAP	
Ludhiana	68	Dakha	Manpreet Singh Ayali	AD (WPD)	Joined AD(WPD) from SAD.
Ludhiana	69	Raikot (SC)	Hakam Singh Thekedar	AAP	
Ludhiana	70	Jagraon (SC)	Saravjit Kaur Manuke	AAP	
Moga	71	Nihal Singh Wala (SC)	Manjit Singh Bilaspur	AAP	
Moga	72	Bhagha Purana	Amritpal Singh Sukhanand	AAP	
Moga	73	Moga	Amandeep Kaur Arora	AAP	
Moga	74	Dharamkot	Devinder Singh Laddi Dhos	AAP	
Ferozpur	75	Zira	Naresh Kataria	AAP	
Ferozpur	76	Firozpur City	Ranveer Singh Bhullar	AAP	
Ferozpur	77	Firozpur Rural (SC)	Rajnish Dahiya	AAP	
Ferozpur	78	Guru Har Sahai	Fauja Singh Sarari	AAP	
Fazilka	79	Jalalabad	Jagdeep Kamboj Goldy	AAP	
Fazilka	80	Fazilka	Narinderpal Singh Sawna	AAP	
Fazilka	81	Abohar	Sandeep Jakhar	INC	
Fazilka	81	Abohar	Sandeep Jakhar	IND	Suspended by INC in August 2023.
Fazilka	82	Balluana (SC)	Amandeep Singh ‘Goldy’ Musafir	AAP	
Sri Muktsar Sahib	83	Lambi	Gurmeet Singh Khudian	AAP	
Sri Muktsar Sahib	84	Gidderbaha	Amrinder Singh Raja Warring	INC	Elected to 18th Lok Sabha in June 2024
Sri Muktsar Sahib	84	Gidderbaha	Hardeep Singh Dhillon	AAP	
Sri Muktsar Sahib	85	Malout (SC)	Baljit Kaur	AAP	
Sri Muktsar Sahib	86	Muktsar	Jagdeep Singh Brar	AAP	
Faridkot	87	Faridkot	Gurdit Singh Sekhon	AAP	
Faridkot	88	Kotkapura	Kultar Singh Sandhwan	AAP	Speaker
Faridkot	89	Jaitu (SC)	Amolak Singh	AAP	
Bathinda	90	Rampura Phul	Balkar Singh Sidhu	AAP	
Bathinda	91	Bhucho Mandi (SC)	Master Jagsir Singh	AAP	
Bathinda	92	Bathinda Urban	Jagroop Singh Gill	AAP	
Bathinda	93	Bathinda Rural (SC)	Amit Rattan Kotfatta	AAP	
Bathinda	94	Talwandi Sabo	Baljinder Kaur	AAP	
Bathinda	95	Maur	Sukhvir Maiser Khana	AAP	
Mansa	96	Mansa	Vijay Singla	AAP	
Mansa	97	Sardulgarh	Gurpreet Singh Banawali	AAP	
Mansa	98	Budhlada (SC)	Budhram Singh	AAP	
Sangrur	99	Lehragaga	Barinder Kumar Goyal	AAP	
Sangrur	100	Dirba (SC)	Harpal Singh Cheema	AAP	Dy. Leader of the House
Sangrur	101	Sunam	Aman Arora	AAP	
Sangrur	102	Malerkotla	Mohammad Jamil Ur Rehman	AAP	
Sangrur	103	Amargarh	Jaswant Singh Gajjan Majra	AAP	
Sangrur	104	Dhuri	Bhagwant Mann	AAP	Chief Minister
Sangrur	105	Sangrur	Narinder Kaur Bharaj	AAP	
Barnala	106	Bhadaur (SC)	Labh Singh Ugoke	AAP	
Barnala	107	Barnala	Gurmeet Singh Meet Hayer	AAP	Elected to 18th Lok Sabha in June 2024
Barnala	107	Barnala	Kuldeep Singh Dhillon	INC	
Barnala	108	Mehal Kalan (SC)	Kulwant Singh Pandori	AAP	
Patiala	109	Nabha (SC)	Gurdev Singh Dev Maan	AAP	
Patiala	110	Patiala Rural	Balbir Singh	AAP	
Patiala	111	Rajpura	Neena Mittal	AAP	
Sahibzada Ajit Singh Nagar	112	Dera Bassi	Kuljit Singh Randhawa	AAP	
Patiala	113	Ghanaur	Gurlal Ghanaur	AAP	
Patiala	114	Sanour	Harmit Singh Pathanmajra	AAP	
Patiala	115.	Patiala	Ajit Pal Singh Kohli	AAP	
Patiala	116	Samana	Chetan Singh Jaura Majra	AAP	
Patiala	117	Shutrana (SC)	Kulwant Singh Bazigar	AAP	

== Past election results ==
Year							Total	Majority
Year	INC	SAD	AAP	BJP	IND	OTH	Total	Majority
1952	96	13	~	~	9	8	126	64
1957	120	^	~	~	13	21	154	78
1962	90	19	~	~	18	27	154	78
1967	48	^	~	~	9	47	104	53
1969	38	43	~	~	4	17	104	53
1972	66	24	~	~	3	11	104	53
1977	17	58	~	~	2	40	117	59
1980	63	37	~	1	2	14	117	59
1985	32	73	~	6	4	2	117	59
1992	87	3	~	6	4	20	117	59
1997	14	75	~	18	6	4	117	59
2002	62	41	~	3	9	2	117	59
2007	44	49	~	19	5	0	117	59
2012	46	56	~	12	3	0	117	59
2017	77	15	20	3	0	2	117	59
2022	18	3	92	2	1	1	117	59

- ^ - Party didn't contest election
- ~ - Party didn't exist
- - Green color box indicates the party/parties who formed the government
- - Red color box indicates the official opposition party

== List of Punjab Legislative Assemblies ==
Punjab Provincial Assembly (1937-1947)
Assembly	Tenure		Leader of the House	Premier	Party formed government	Note
Assembly	First sitting	Date of dissolution	Leader of the House	Premier	Party formed government	Note
1	5 April 1937	19 March 1945	Sikandar Hayat Khan		Unionist Party	Assembly tenure extended due to World War II
1	5 April 1937	19 March 1945	Malik Khizar Hayat Tiwana		Unionist Party	Assembly dissolved to conduct fresh and Impartial election
2	21 March 1946	4 July 1947	Malik Khizar Hayat Tiwana		Unionist Party	Assembly dissolved since government resigned against Partition
Punjab Legislative Assembly (1947–present)
Assembly	Tenure		Leader of the House	Chief Minister	Party formed government	Note
Assembly	First sitting	Date of dissolution	Leader of the House	Chief Minister	Party formed government	Note
Interim	1 November 1947	20 June 1951	Gopi Chand Bhargava		Indian National Congress	Interim Assembly
Interim	1 November 1947	20 June 1951	Bhim Sen Sachar		Indian National Congress	Interim Assembly
Interim	1 November 1947	20 June 1951	Gopi Chand Bhargava		Indian National Congress	Interim Assembly
1st	3 May 1952	31 March 1957	Bhim Sen Sachar		Indian National Congress	
1st	3 May 1952	31 March 1957	Partap Singh Kairon		Indian National Congress	
2nd	24 April 1957	1 March 1962	Partap Singh Kairon		Indian National Congress	
3rd	13 March 1962	28 February 1967	Partap Singh Kairon		Indian National Congress	Assembly under suspension from 5 July 1966 to 1 November 1966
3rd	13 March 1962	28 February 1967	Partap Singh Kairon	Gopi Chand Bhargava	Indian National Congress	Assembly under suspension from 5 July 1966 to 1 November 1966
3rd	13 March 1962	28 February 1967	Ram Kishan		Indian National Congress	Assembly under suspension from 5 July 1966 to 1 November 1966
3rd	13 March 1962	28 February 1967	Ram Kishan	Gurmukh Singh Musafir	Indian National Congress	Assembly under suspension from 5 July 1966 to 1 November 1966
4th	20 March 1967	23 August 1968	Gurnam Singh		Akali Dal - Sant Fateh Singh	Assembly dissolved prematurely
4th	20 March 1967	23 August 1968	Lachhman Singh Gill		Punjab Janta Party	Assembly dissolved prematurely
5th	13 March 1969	14 June 1971	Gurnam Singh		Shiromani Akali Dal	Assembly dissolved prematurely
5th	13 March 1969	14 June 1971	Parkash Singh Badal		Shiromani Akali Dal	Assembly dissolved prematurely
6th	21 March 1972	30 April 1977	Zail Singh		Indian National Congress	Assembly tenure extended by one month due to Emergency
7th	30 June 1977	17 February 1980	Parkash Singh Badal		Shiromani Akali Dal	Assembly dissolved prematurely
8th	23 June 1980	26 June 1985	Darbara Singh		Indian National Congress	Assembly suspended from 6 October 1983 and later dissolved due to Insurgency on 26 June 1985.
9th	14 October 1985	6 March 1988	Surjit Singh Barnala		Shiromani Akali Dal	Assembly suspended prematurely due to Insurgency on 11 June 1987 and later on dissolved on 6 March 1988.
10	16 March 1992	11 February 1997	Beant Singh		Indian National Congress	-
10	16 March 1992	11 February 1997	Harcharan Singh Brar		Indian National Congress	-
10	16 March 1992	11 February 1997	Rajinder Kaur Bhattal		Indian National Congress	-
11	3 March 1997	26 February 2002	Parkash Singh Badal		Shiromani Akali Dal	
12	21 March 2002	27 February 2007	Amarinder Singh		Indian National Congress	
13	1 March 2007	6 March 2012	Parkash Singh Badal		Shiromani Akali Dal	
14	19 March 2012	11 March 2017	Parkash Singh Badal		Shiromani Akali Dal	
15	24 March 2017	11 March 2022	Amarinder Singh		Indian National Congress	
15	24 March 2017	11 March 2022	Charanjit Singh Channi		Indian National Congress	
16	17 March 2022	Incumbent	Bhagwant Mann		Aam Aadmi Party	

== See also ==
- PEPSU
- Interim East Punjab Assembly
- Elections in Punjab
- List of governors of Punjab (India)
- List of constituencies of Punjab Legislative Assembly
- List of deputy chief ministers of Punjab, India
- List of speakers of the Punjab Legislative Assembly
- List of leaders of the opposition in the Punjab Legislative Assembly
