= Punjab Assembly Committee on Papers laid/to be laid on the table and Library =

Indian Legislative committee

Committee on Papers laid/to be laid on the table and Library
Committee of the House
- 16th Punjab Assembly
- State: Punjab

Leadership
- Chaiperson: Jagdeep Kamboj Goldy
- Chairperson party: Aam Aadmi Party
- Appointer: Punjab Assembly speaker

Structure
- Seats: 10
- Political Parties: AAP (7); INC (2); IND (1)
- Election criteria: The members are elected every year from amongst its members of house according to the principle of proportional representation.
- Tenure: 1 Year

Jurisdiction
- Purpose: Legislative oversight of the Papers laid/to be laid on the table and Library

Rules & Procedure
- Applicable rules: Article 208 of the Constitution of India section 32 of the States Reorganisation Act, 1956; Rules 232(1) and 2(b) of Rules of Procedure and Conduct of Business in Punjab Legislative Assembly

Punjab Assembly Committee on Papers laid/to be laid on the table of the House and Library of Punjab Legislative Assembly is constituted annually for a one-year period from among the members of the Assembly. This Committee consists of ten members. Up to 2021, the Library Committee and the Committee on Papers Laid/ To be Laid on the Table of the House, existed separately. They were merged in 2021.

== Appointment ==
The speaker appoints the committee and its members every year for a one-year term according to the powers conferred by Article 208 of the Constitution of India read with section 32 of the States Reorganisation Act, 1956 (37 of 1956), and in pursuance of Rules 232(1) and 2(b) of the Rules of Procedure and Conduct of Business in the Punjab Legislative Assembly.

== Members ==
For the one-year period starting May 2022, the Committee on Papers laid/to be laid on the table and Library of 16th Punjab Assembly had following members:

Committee on Papers laid/to be laid on the table and Library (2022–23)
Sr. No.	Name	Post	Party
1	Jagdeep Kamboj Goldy	Chairperson	AAP
2	Amolak Singh	Member	AAP
3	Anmol Gagan Maan	Member	AAP
4	Gurdit Singh Sekhon	Member	AAP
5	Gurlal Ghanaur	Member	AAP
6	Hakam Singh Thekedar	Member	AAP
7	Hardev Singh Laddi	Member	INC
8	Naresh Puri	Member	INC
9	Rana Inder Pratap Singh	Member	Independent
10	Ranbir Singh Bhullar	Member	AAP

== Chairpersons ==
Committee on Papers laid/to be laid on the table (Until 2021)
Tenure	Terms	Name	Political party
2013-14	1	Sadhu Singh Dharamsot	Shiromani Akali Dal
2016-17	1	Balbir Singh Sidhu	Indian National Congress

Committee on Library (Until 2021)
Tenure	Terms	Name	Political party
2013-14	1	Manjit Singh Miyawind	Shiromani Akali Dal
2016-17	1	Darshan Singh Kotfatta	Shiromani Akali Dal

Committee on Papers laid/to be laid on the table and Library (Post 2021)
Tenure	Terms	Name	Political party
2021-22	1	Lakhbir Singh Lodhinangal	Shiromani Akali Dal
2022-23	1	Jagdeep Kamboj Goldy	Aam Aadmi Party

== Previous members ==
For the one-year period in the 15th Punjab Assembly the committee had following members:

=== 2021-2022 ===
Committee on Papers laid/to be laid on the table and Library (2021–22)
Sr. No.	Name	Post	Party
1	Lakhbir Singh Lodhinangal	Chairperson	INC
2	Indu Bala	Member	INC
3	Jagtar Singh Jagga Hissowal	Member	INC
4	Kultar Singh Sandhwan	Member	AAP
5	Nirmal Singh	Member	INC
6	Rajinder Beri	Member	INC
7	Sanjeev Talwar	Member	INC
8	Simarjeet Singh Bains	Member	INC
9	Sushil Kumar Rinku	Member	INC

== Previous members of Committee on Papers tabled in the House ==
=== 2019-2020 ===
Committee on Papers laid/to be laid on the table (2019–20)
Sr. No.	Name	Post	Party
1	Gurpartap Singh Wadala	Chairperson	INC
2	Balwinder Singh	Member	INC
3	Amit Vij	Member	INC
4	Davinder Singh Ghubaya	Member	INC
5	Baldev Singh	Member	INC
6	Rajinder Singh	Member	INC
7	Rajnish Kumar	Member	INC
8	Satkar Kaur	Member	INC
9	Chaudhary Surinder Singh	Member	INC
10.	Jagdev Singh Kamalu	Member	

=== 2018-2019 ===
Committee on Papers laid/to be laid on the table (2018–19)
Sr. No.	Name	Post	Party
1	Gurpartap Singh Wadala	Chairperson	INC
2	Arun Narang	Member	BJP
3	Avtar Singh Junior	Member	INC
4	Davinder Singh Ghubaya	Member	INC
5	Harminder Singh Gill	Member	INC
6	Jai Krishan Singh	Member	AAP
7	Sarvjit Kaur Manuke	Member	AAP
8	Satkar Kaur	Member	INC
9	Chaudhary Surinder Singh	Member	INC
10.	Sushil Kumar Rinku	Member	

=== 2017-2018 ===
Committee on Papers laid/to be laid on the table (2017–18)
Sr. No.	Name	Post	Party
1	Gurpartap Singh Wadala	Chairperson	INC
2	Sangat Singh Gilzian	Member	INC
3	Simarjeet Singh Bains	Member	INC
4	Harpartap Singh Ajanala	Member	INC
5	Gurpreet Singh	Member	INC
6	Jai Krishan	Member	AAP
7	Jagtar Singh Jagga Hissowal	Member	INC
8	Darshan Lal	Member	INC
9	Dalvir Singh Goldy	Member	INC
10.	Bharat Bhushan Ashu	Member	INC

== Previous members of Library Committee ==
=== 2020-2021 ===
Library Committee(2020–21)
Sr. No.	Name	Post	Party
1	Surinder Kumar Dawar	Chairperson	INC
2	Avtar Singh Junior	Member	INC
3	Harjot Kamal Singh	Member	INC
4	Harminder Singh Gill	Member	INC
5	Jagdev Singh	Member	INC
6	Jagtar Singh Jagga Hissowal	Member	INC
7	Gurpartap Singh Wadalal	Member	INC
8	Simarjeet Singh Bains	Member	INC
9	Sukhjit Singh	Member	INC

=== 2019-2020 ===
Library Committee(2019–20)
Sr. No.	Name	Post	Party
1	Balbir Singh Sidhu	Chairperson	INC
2	Amarjit Singh Sandoya	Member	INC
3	Arun Dogra	Member	INC
4	Avtar Singh Junior	Member	INC
5	Baldev Singh Khaira	Member	INC
6	Gurpreet Singh	Member	INC
7	Jai Krishan Singh	Member	AAP
8	Kuljit Singh Nagra	Member	INC
9	Lakhvir Singh Lakha	Member	INC

=== 2018-2019 ===
Library Committee(2018–19)
Sr. No.	Name	Post	Party
1	Amrik Singh Dhillon	Chairperson	INC
2	Balwinder Singh	Member	INC
3	Dilraj Singh	Member	INC
4	Kultar Singh Sandhwan	Member	AAP
5	Kulwant Singh Pandori	Member	AAP
6	Pawan Kumar Adia	Member	INC
7	Rajnish Kumar Babbi	Member	INC
8	Randeep Singh Nabha	Member	INC
9	Sukhwinder Singh Danny Bandala	Member	INC

=== 2017-2018 ===
Library Committee(2017–18)
Sr. No.	Name	Post	Party
1	Surinder Kumar Dawar	Chairperson	INC
2	Surjit Singh Dhiman	Member	INC
3	Hardial Singh Kamboj	Member	INC
4	Kultar Singh Sandhwan	Member	AAP
5	Balwinder Singh khaira	Member	INC
6	Davinder Singh Ghubaya	Member	INC
7	Balwinder Singh Bains	Member	INC
8	Budh Ram	Member	INC
9	Rajnish Kumar Babbi	Member	INC
