= 13th Punjab Assembly =

Members of Punjab Legislative Assembly

Thirteenth Legislative Assembly of Punjab

Type
- Type: Unicameral
- Houses: Punjab Legislative Assembly

History
- Founded: March 2007
- Disbanded: March 2012
- Preceded by: 12th Punjab Assembly
- Succeeded by: 14th Punjab Assembly

Leadership
- Speaker: Nirmal Singh Kahlon
- Deputy Speaker: Satpal Gosain

Structure
- Seats: 117
- Length of term: 2007-2012

Elections
- Voting system: First-past-the-post
- Last election: February 2007
- Next election: February 2012

2007 Punjab Legislative Assembly election for the constitution of the Thirteenth Legislative Assembly of Punjab was held in the Indian state of Punjab.

The term of the twelfth Punjab assembly ended with its dissolution in March 2007. The dissolution was necessitated after the results of the election was declared.

== Committees ==
Committee	Chairperson	Party	Tenure	Term
Committee on Public Accounts	Avtar Singh Brar	Indian National Congress	May 2010 – 2011	1
Committee on Estimates	Balbir Singh Batth	Shiromani Akali Dal	May 2010 – 2011	1
Committee on Government Business	Virsa Singh Valtoha	Shiromani Akali Dal	May 2010 – 2011	1
Committee on Welfare of Scheduled Castes, Scheduled Tribes and Backward Classes	Dalbir Singh		May 2010 – 2011	1
Committee on Local Bodies and Panchayati Raj Institutions	Surjit Kumar Jiyani	Bharatiya Janata Party	2010-11	1
Committee on Subordinate Legislation	Anil Joshi	Bharatiya Janata Party	May 2010 – 2011	1
Committee on Papers Laid/to be Laid on the Table and Library	Darshan Singh Brar	Indian National Congress	May 2010 – 2011	1
Committee on Library	Ajit Singh		May 2010 – 2011	1
Committee on Special Rights	Sarabjit Singh Makkar	Shiromani Akali Dal	May 2010 – 2011	1
House Committee	Satpal Gosain	Bharatiya Janata Party	May 2010 – 2011	1
Committee on Questions & References	Chaudhary Mohan Lal	Indian National Congress	May 2010 – 2011	1

== Members of the Punjab Legislative Assembly ==
The following is the list of the members of the Punjab Vidhan Sabha.

Constituency	Candidate	Party
Abohar	SUNIL KUMAR JAKHAR	Indian National Congress
Adampur	SARBJEET SINGH MAKKAR	Akali Dal
Ajnala	AMARPAL SINGH AJNALA	Akali Dal
Amloh	SADHU SINGH	Indian National Congress
Amritsar Central	LAKSHMI KANTA CHAWLA	Bharatiya Janta Party
Amritsar North	ANIL JOSHI	Bharatiya Janta Party
Amritsar South	RAMINDER SINGH BOLARIA	Akali Dal
Amritsar West	OM PARKASH SONI	Indian National Congress
Anandpur Sahib	SANT AJIT SINGH	Akali Dal
Attari	GULZAR SINGH RANIKE	Akali Dal
Bagha Purana	DARSHAN SINGH BRAR (KHOTE)	Indian National Congress
Balachaur	NAND LAL	Akali Dal
Balluana	GURTEJ SINGH	Akali Dal
Banga	MOHAN LAL	Akali Dal
Banur	JASJIT SINGH BUNNY	Akali Dal
Barnala	KEWAL SINGH DHILLON	Indian National Congress
Batala	JAGDISH SAHNI	Bharatiya Janta Party
Beas	MANJINDER SINGH KANG	Akali Dal
Bhadaur	BALVIR SINGH GHUNAS	Akali Dal
Bhatinda	HARMINDER SINGH JASSI	Indian National Congress
Bholath	SUKHPAL SINGH	Indian National Congress
Budhlada	MANGAT RAI BANSAL	Indian National Congress
Chamkaur Sahib	CHARANJIT SINGH CHANNI	Independent
Dakala	LAL SINGH	Indian National Congress
Dakha	DARSHAN SINGH SHIVALIK	Akali Dal
Dasuya	AMARJIT SINGH SAHI	Bharatiya Janta Party
Dhanaula	KULDIP SINGH BHATHAL	Indian National Congress
Dharamkot	SEETAL SINGH	Akali Dal
Dhariwal	SUCHA SINGH LANGAH	Akali Dal
Dhuri	IQBAL SINGH JHUNDAN	Independent
Dina Nagar	SITA RAM	Bharatiya Janta Party
Dirbha	SURJIT SINGH DHIMAN	Indian National Congress
Faridkot	AVTAR SINGH BRAR	Indian National Congress
Fatehgarh	NIRMAL SINGH KAHLON	Akali Dal
Fazilka	SURJEET KUMAR	Bharatiya Janta Party
Firozepur	SUKHPAL SINGH	Bharatiya Janta Party
Firozepur Cantonment	JANMEJA SINGH	Akali Dal
Garhdiwala	DES RAJ DHUGGA	Akali Dal
Garhshankar	LOV KUMAR GOLDY	Indian National Congress
Ghanaur	MADAN LAL THEKEDAR	Independent
Giddar Baha	MANPREET SINGH BADAL	P.P.P.
Gurdaspur	GURBACHAN SINGH	Akali Dal
Guru Har Sahai	GURMEET SINGH	Indian National Congress
Hoshiarpur	TIKSHAN SUD	Bharatiya Janta Party
Jagraon	GURDEEP SINGH BHAINI	Indian National Congress
Jalalabad	Sukhbir Singh Badal	Akali Dal
Jandiala	MALKIAT SINGH	Akali Dal
Joga	JAGDEEP SINGH NAKAI	Akali Dal
Jullundur Cantonment	JAGBIR SINGH BRAR	indian national congress
Jullundur Central	MANORANJAN KALIA	Bharatiya Janta Party
Jullundur North	K.D. BHANDARI	Bharatiya Janta Party
Jullundur South	CHUNI LAL BHAGAT	Bharatiya Janta Party
Kahnuwan	SEWA SINGH SEKHWAN	Akali Dal
Kapurthala	RANA RAJBANS KAUR	Indian National Congress
Kartarpur	AVINASH CHANDER	Akali Dal
Khadoor Sahib	MANJIT SINGH MIANWIND	Akali Dal
Khanna	BIKRAMJIT SINGH	Akali Dal
Kharar	BALBIR SINGH	Indian National Congress
Kot Kapura	RIPJIT SINGH	Indian National Congress
Kum Kalan	ISHAR SINGH MEHARBAN	Indian National Congress
Lambi	Parkash Singh Badal	Akali Dal
Lehra	RAJINDER KAUR	Indian National Congress
Lohian	AJIT SINGH KOHAR	Akali Dal
Ludhiana East	SAT PAL GOSAIN	Bharatiya Janta Party
Ludhiana North	HARISH BEDI	Bharatiya Janta Party
Ludhiana Rural	HIRA SINGH GABRIA	Akali Dal
Ludhiana West	HARISH RAI DHANDA	Akali Dal
Mahilpur	SOHAN SINGH THANDAL	Akali Dal
Majitha	BIKRAM SINGH MAJITHIA	Akali Dal
Malerkotla	RAZIA SULTANA	Indian National Congress
Malout	HARPREET SINGH	Akali Dal
Mansa	SHER SINGH	Indian National Congress
Moga	JOGINDER PAL JAIN	Indian National Congress
Morinda	UJAGGAR SINGH	Akali Dal
Mukerian	ARUNESH KUMAR	Bharatiya Janta Party
Muktsar	KANWARJIT SINGH	Indian National Congress
Nabha	RANDEEP SINGH	Indian National Congress
Nakodar	AMARJIT SINGH SAMRA	Indian National Congress
Nangal	KANWAR PAL SINGH	Indian National Congress
Narot Mehra	BISHAMBER DASS	Bharatiya Janta Party
Nathana	AJAIB SINGH BHATTI	Indian National Congress
Naushahra Panwan	RANJIT SINGH BRAHAMPURA	Akali Dal
Nawan Shahr	JATINDER SINGH KARIHA	Akali Dal
Nihal Singh Wala	AJIT SINGH	Independent
Nurmahel	RAJWINDER KAUR	Akali Dal
Panjgrain	JOGINDER SINGH	Indian National Congress
Pakka Kalan	MAKHAN SINGH	Indian National Congress
Pathankot	MASTER MOHAN LAL	Bharatiya Janta Party
Patiala	Amarinder Singh	Indian National Congress
Patti	ADESH PARTAP SINGH	Akali Dal
Payal	TEJ PARKASH SINGH	Indian National Congress
Phagwara	SWARNA RAM	Bharatiya Janta Party
Phillaur	SARWAN SINGH	Akali Dal
Qadian	LAKHBIR SINGH LODHINANGAL	Akali Dal
Qila Raipur	JASBIR SINGH KHANGURA	Indian National Congress
Raikot	HARMOHINDER SINGH PARDHAAN	Indian National Congress
Raja Sansi	SUKHBINDER SINGH SARKARIA	Indian National Congress
Rajpura	RAJ KHURANA	Bharatiya Janta Party
Rampura Phul	GURPREET SINGH KANGAR	Indian National Congress
Samana	BRAHM MAHINDRA	Indian National Congress
Samrala	JAGJIWAN SINGH	Akali Dal
Sangrur	SURINDER PAL SINGH SIBIA	Indian National Congress
Sardulgarh	AJIT INDER SINGH	Indian National Congress
Sham Chaurasi	MOHINDER KAUR	Akali Dal
Sherpur	HARCHAND KAUR	Indian National Congress
Shutrana	NIRMAL SINGH	Indian National Congress
Sirhind	DIDAR SINGH	Akali Dal
Srihargobindpur	CAPT. BALBIR SINGH BATH	Akali Dal
Sujanpur	DINESH SINGH	Bharatiya Janta Party
Sultanpur	UPINDERJIT KAUR	Akali Dal
Sunam	PARMINDER SINGH DHINDSA	Akali Dal
Talwandi Sabo	JEETMOHINDER SINGH SIDHU	Indian National Congress
Tanda	SANGAT SINGH GILZIAN	Independent
Tarn Taran	HARMEET SINGH	Akali Dal
Valtoha	VIRSA SINGH	Akali Dal
Verka	DALBIR SINGH	Bharatiya Janta Party
Zira	NARESH KUMAR	Indian National Congress
