= Moga Assembly constituency =

Legislative Assembly constituency in Punjab State, India

Coordinates: 30.83°N 75.18°E

Moga
- Constituency No. 73 for the Punjab Legislative Assembly

Constituency details
- Country: India
- State: Punjab
- District: Moga
- Lok Sabha constituency: Faridkot
- Total electors: 203,541
- Reservation: None

Member of Legislative Assembly
- 16th Punjab Legislative Assembly
- Incumbent Amandeep Kaur Arora
- Party: Aam Aadmi Party
- Elected year: 2022

Moga Assembly constituency (Sl. No.: 73) is a Punjab Legislative Assembly constituency in Moga district, Punjab state, India.

== Members of the Legislative Assembly ==
Most successful parties from Moga Vidhan Sabha
1. INC (8 Times) (50.0%)
2. SAD (4 Times) (25.0%)
3. AAP (1 Time) (6.25%)
4. INC (I) (1 Time) (6.25%)
5. JP(1 Time) (6.25%)
6. SSP (1 Time) (6.25%)

Year	Member	Party
1957	Jagraj Singh	Indian National Congress
1962	Gurcharan Singh	Shiromani Akali Dal
1967	Nachattar Singh	Indian National Congress
1969	Roop Lal Sathi	Samyukta Socialist Party
1972	Gurdev Kaur	Indian National Congress
1977	Roop Lal Sathi	Janata Party
1980	Nachattar Singh	Indian National Congress (Indira)
1985	Gurcharan Singh	Indian National Congress
1992	Malti Thapar	Indian National Congress
1997	Tota Singh	Shiromani Akali Dal
2002	Tota Singh	Shiromani Akali Dal
2007	Joginder Pal Jain	Indian National Congress
2012	Joginder Pal Jain	Indian National Congress
2013^	Joginder Pal Jain	Shiromani Akali Dal
2017	Harjot Kamal Singh	Indian National Congress
2022	Amandeep Kaur Arora	Aam Aadmi Party

^Bye election

== Election results ==
=== 2027 ===
Punjab Assembly election, 2027: Moga
Party	Candidate	Votes	%	±%
AAP	Amandeep Kaur Arora			
AD (WPD)				New entry
INC				
BSP				
SAD				
BJP				
NOTA	None of the above			
Majority				
Turnout				

=== 2022 ===
Punjab Assembly election, 2022: Moga
Party	Candidate	Votes	%	±%
AAP	Amandeep Kaur Arora	59,149	41.01	▲6.04
INC	Malvika Sood	38,234	26.51	▼9.68
SAD	Barjinder Singh Brar	28,333	19.64	▼5.65
BJP	Harjot Kamal Singh	10,606	7.35	New entry
SAD(A)	Manjeet Singh Mallah	3,803	2.64	▲2.64
NOTA	None of the above	925	0.64	▲0.10
Majority		20,915	14.5	▲13.28
Turnout		144,232	70.73	▼4.04
Registered electors		203,919		
AAP gain from INC				

=== 2017 ===
Punjab Assembly election, 2017: Moga
Party	Candidate	Votes	%	±%
INC	Harjot Kamal Singh	52,357	36.19	▼2.50
AAP	Ramesh Grover	50,593	34.97	New
SAD	Barjinder Singh Brar	36,587	25.29	▼27.87
NOTA	None of the above	785	0.54	New
Majority		1,764	1.22	▼13.25
Turnout		144,678	74.77	▲2.16
Registered electors		193,504		
INC gain from SAD				

=== 2013 Bye election ===
2013 Punjab Legislative Assembly Bye election : Moga
Party	Candidate	Votes	%	±%
SAD	Joginder Pal Jain	69,269	53.16	▲10.21
INC	Sathi Vijay Kumar	50,420	38.69	▼7.71
PPoP	Ravinder Singh Dhaliwal	7,554	5.80	▼1.59
SAD(A)	Birinderpal Singh	822	0.63	▲0.63
Margin of victory		18,849	14.47	▲11.02
Turnout		1,30,302	72.61	▼4.21
Registered electors		1,79,448		
SAD gain from INC				

=== 2012 ===
2012 Punjab Legislative Assembly election : Moga
Party	Candidate	Votes	%	±%
INC	Joginder Pal Jain	62,200	46.40	▼1.37
SAD	Paramdeep Singh Gill	57,575	42.95	▼3.70
PPoP	Ravinder Singh Dhaliwal	9,910	7.39	New
BSP	Pritpal Singh	1,791	1.43	▲0.51
Margin of victory		4,625	3.45	▲2.33
Turnout		1,34,065	76.82	▼4.21
Registered electors		1,74,531		
INC hold				

=== 2007 ===
2007 Punjab Legislative Assembly election : Moga
Party	Candidate	Votes	%	±%
INC	Joginder Pal Jain	55,300	47.77	▼1.37
SAD	Tota Singh	54,008	46.65	▼3.70
CPI	Randhir Singh	3,068	2.65	▲2.65
BSP	Kulwant Singh	1,791	0.92	▲0.51
Margin of victory		1,292	1.12	▲0.77
Turnout		1,15,770	75.90	▲17.89
Registered electors		1,52,708		
INC gain from SAD				

=== 2002 ===
2002 Punjab Legislative Assembly election : Moga
Party	Candidate	Votes	%	±%
SAD	Tota Singh	42,579	47.91	▲0.50
INC	Sathi Vijay Kumar	42,274	47.56	▲24.53
SAD(A)	Buta Singh	2,125	2.39	▲2.39
CPI(M)	Ved Parkash	120	0.14	▲0.14
Margin of victory		305	0.35	▼24.38
Turnout		89,194	58.01	▼8.45
Registered electors		1,53,753		
SAD hold				

=== 1997 ===
1997 Punjab Legislative Assembly election : Moga
Party	Candidate	Votes	%	±%
SAD	Tota Singh	41,616	47.41	▲47.41
JD	Sathi Vijay Kumar	20,217	23.03	▼7.72
INC	Malti Thapar	16,919	19.27	▼11.51
BSP	Amarjit Singh	5,703	6.50	▼3.51
Independent	Jagdish Chander	2,542	2.90	▼18.11
Majority		21,399	24.38	▲24.35
Turnout		88,825	66.46	▲42.56
Registered electors		1,33,659		
SAD gain from INC				

=== 1992 ===
1992 Punjab Legislative Assembly election : Moga
Party	Candidate	Votes	%	±%
INC	Malti Thapar	7,865	30.78	▼6.77
JD	Roop Lal Sathi	7,858	30.75	▼0.76
BJP	Jagdish Chander	5,370	21.01	New
BSP	Malkit Singh	2,557	10.01	New
Independent	Nanak Singh	1,904	7.45	New
Majority		7	0.03	▼6.01
Turnout		26,532	23.90	▼45.26
Registered electors		1,10,970		
INC hold				

=== 1985 ===
1985 Punjab Legislative Assembly election : Moga
Party	Candidate	Votes	%	±%
INC	Gurcharan Singh	23,651	37.55	▼5.52
JP	Roop Lal Sathi	19,848	31.51	▼0.49
SAD	Charan Dass	15,617	24.79	▲12.69
Independent	Harbans Singh	1,232	1.96	New
Independent	Narotam Lal	1,087	1.73	New
Independent	Piara Singh	660	1.05	New
Majority		3,803	6.04	▼5.03
Turnout		66,242	69.16	▲8.23
Registered electors		95,776		
INC hold				

=== 1980 ===
1980 Punjab Legislative Assembly election : Moga
Party	Candidate	Votes	%	±%
INC(I)	Nachhattar Singh	22,460	43.07	▼1.09
JP(S)	Roop Lal Sathi	16,686	32.00	▼23.84
SAD	Gurnam Singh Tir	6,312	12.10	New
Independent	Gurbux Singh	3,702	7.10	New
BJP	Om Parkash	2,295	4.40	New
Majority		5,774	11.07	▼0.61
Turnout		52,375	60.93	▼5.98
Registered electors		86,547		
INC(I) gain from JP				

=== 1977 ===
1977 Punjab Legislative Assembly election : Moga
Party	Candidate	Votes	%	±%
JP	Roop Lal Sathi	28,652	55.84	New
INC	Iqbal Singh	22,656	44.16	▲2.65
Majority		5,996	11.68	▲4.13
Turnout		52,050	66.91	▼7.88
Registered electors		77,790		
JP gain from INC				

=== 1972 ===
1972 Punjab Legislative Assembly election : Moga
Party	Candidate	Votes	%	±%
INC	Gurdev Kaur	22,793	41.51	▲18.06
SAD	Nachhatar Singh	18,947	33.96	▼1.68
Independent	Roop Lal Sathi	13,210	24.06	▼15.50
Independent	Kartar Singh	264	0.48	New
Majority		4,146	7.55	▲3.63
Turnout		55,774	74.79	▲0.29
Registered electors		74,579		
INC gain from SSP				

=== 1969 ===
1969 Punjab Legislative Assembly election : Moga
Party	Candidate	Votes	%	±%
SSP	Roop Lal Sathi	19,978	39.56	▲13.60
SAD	Harbans Singh	17,998	35.64	▲12.20
INC	Sat Dev	11,842	23.45	▼14.80
Independent	Tara Singh	686	1.36	New
Majority		1,980	3.92	▼8.37
Turnout		51,500	74.48	▲0.29
Registered electors		69,145		
SSP gain from INC				

=== 1967 ===
1967 Punjab Legislative Assembly election : Moga
Party	Candidate	Votes	%	±%
INC	Nachattar Singh	16,847	38.25	▼5.78
SSP	Roop Lal Sathi	11,433	25.96	New
Akali Dal (SFS)	D. Singh	10,324	23.44	▼23.57
Independent	R. Singh	4,178	9.49	New
Majority		5,414	12.29	▲9.32
Turnout		46,430	77.48	▲3.21
Registered electors		59,927		
INC gain from SAD				

=== 1962 ===
1962 Punjab Legislative Assembly election : Moga
Party	Candidate	Votes	%	±%
SAD	Gurcharan Singh	22,155	47.01	New
INC	Jagraj Singh	20,754	44.03	▼15.53
ABJS	Gobind Lal	4,224	8.96	▼8.96
Majority		1,401	2.97	▼34.07
Turnout		48,514	74.27	▲12.67
Registered electors		65,321		
SAD gain from INC				

=== 1957 ===
1957 Punjab Legislative Assembly election : Moga
Party	Candidate	Votes	%
INC	Jagraj Singh	21,417	59.56
Independent	Rattan Singh	8,099	22.52
ABJS	Shadi Lal	6,444	17.92
Majority		13,318	37.04
Turnout		35,960	61.60
Registered electors		58,372	

== Moga-Dharamkot constituency ==
During the 1952 Punjab Legislative Assembly election, Moga-Dharamkot constituency was one of 21 two-member constituencies.

1952 Punjab Legislative Assembly election : Moga-Dharamkot
Party	Candidate	Votes	%
SAD	Davinder Singh	19,429	18.97
INC	Rattan Singh	18,492	18.05
SAD	Mukhtair Singh	16,439	16.05
INC	Sohan Singh	15,907	15.53
CPI	Mehar Singh	9,212	8.99
Independent	Lal	6,100	5.96
Socialist Party (India)	Roop Lal Sathi	3,641	3.55
ABJS	Sain Dass	2,464	2.41
Socialist Party (India)	Lal Chand	2,358	2.30
Independent	Bachitar Singh	2,023	1.98
Independent	Labh Singh	1,555	1.52
AIFB	Anokh Singh	1,320	1.29
Independent	Sandhu Ram	932	0.91
Independent	Sikandar Lal	736	0.72
Independent	Wazir Singh	662	0.65
Independent	Bakhtawar Singh	648	0.63
Independent	Sher Singh	503	0.49
Turnout		1,02,421	98.33
Registered electors		1,04,163	

== See also ==
- List of constituencies of the Punjab Legislative Assembly
- Moga district
