= Chamkaur Sahib Assembly constituency =

Legislative Assembly constituency in Punjab State, India

Coordinates: 30.89°N 76.41°E

Chamkaur Sahib
- Constituency No. 51 for the Punjab Legislative Assembly
- Current MLA, Dr. Charanjit Singh

Constituency details
- Country: India
- State: Punjab
- District: Rupnagar
- Lok Sabha constituency: Anandpur Sahib
- Total electors: 197,330 (in 2022)
- Reservation: SC

Member of Legislative Assembly
- 16th Punjab Legislative Assembly
- Incumbent Charanjit Singh
- Party: AAP
- Elected year: 2022

Chamkaur Sahib is one of the 117 constituencies of the Punjab Legislative Assembly in the state of Punjab, India. It lies in Rupnagar district and is reserved for member of the Scheduled Castes.

== Members of the Legislative Assembly ==
Most successful parties from Chamkaur Sahib Vidhan Sabha
1. INC (4 Times) (40.0%)
2. SAD (4 Times) (40.0%)
3. AAP (1 Time) (10.0%)
4. IND (1 Time) (10.0%)

Year	Member	Party
1977	Satwant Sandu	Shiromani Akali Dal
1980	Satwant Sandu	Shiromani Akali Dal
1985	Bhag Singh	Indian National Congress
1992	Shamsher Singh	Indian National Congress
1997	Satwant Sandhu	Shiromani Akali Dal
2002	Satwant Sandhu	Shiromani Akali Dal
2007	Charanjit Singh Channi	Independent politician
2012	Charanjit Singh Channi	Indian National Congress
2017	Charanjit Singh Channi	Indian National Congress
2022	Charanjit Singh	Aam Aadmi Party

== Election results ==
=== 2027 ===
Punjab Assembly election, 2027: Chamkaur Sahib
Party	Candidate	Votes	%	±%
AAP	Jasvir Singh Garhi			
INC	Charanjit Singh Channi			
IND	Dr. Charanjit Singh			
SAD				New entry
AD (WPD)				New entry
BJP				
NOTA	None of the above			
Majority				
Turnout				

=== 2022 ===
Assembly Election, 2022: Chamkaur Sahib
Party	Candidate	Votes	%	±%
AAP	Dr. Charanjit Singh	70,248	47.6	
INC	Charanjit Singh Channi	62,306	42.22	
SAD(A)	Lakhvir Singh	6,974	4.73	
BSP	Harmohan Singh Sandhu	3,802	2.58	
BJP	Darshan Singh Shivjot	2,514	1.7	
NOTA	None of the above	713	0.48	
Majority		7,942	5.38	
Turnout		1,47,571		
Registered electors		1,97,330		
AAP gain from INC		Swing		

=== 2017 ===
Charanjit Singh Channi, who, in 2021, became the Chief Minister of Punjab, won the seat for third consecutive time.

Assembly Election, 2017: Chamkaur Sahib
Party	Candidate	Votes	%	±%
INC	Charanjit Singh Channi	61,060	42.00	
AAP	Dr. Charanjit Singh	48,752	33.53	
SAD	Justice Nirmal Singh	31,452	21.63	
BSP	Rajinder Singh	1,610	1.11	
NOTA	None of the above	911	0.63	
Majority		12,308	8.47	
Turnout		1,45,399	77.78	
Registered electors		186,932		
INC hold		Swing		

=== 2012 ===
Assembly Election, 2012: Chamkaur Sahib
Party	Candidate	Votes	%	±%
INC	Charanjit Singh Channi	54,640	41.26	
SAD	Jagmeet Kaur	50,981	38.50	
PPoP	Gurpreet Singh	13,408	10.12	
BSP	Rajinder Singh	9,164	6.92	
IND	Haripal	2,877	2.17	
Majority		3,659	2.76	
Turnout		1,32,430	79.78	
INC hold		Swing		

=== Previous results ===
Year	A C No.	Name	Party	Votes	Runner Up	Party	Votes
2007	66	Charanjit Singh Channi	IND	37946	Satwant Kaur Sandhu	SAD	36188
2002	67	Satwant Kaur Sandhu	SAD	33511	Bhag Singh	INC	24413
1997	67	Satwant Kaur Sandhu	SAD	40349	Nirmal Singh	SAD (M)	14205
1992	67	Shamsher Singh	INC	3641	Gurmukh Singh	BSP	2706
1985	67	Bhag Singh	INC	19928	Bimal Kaur	IND	18134
1980	67	Satwant Kaur Sandhu	SAD	23352	Karnail Singh	INC (I)	18277
1977	67	Satwant Kaur Sandhu	SAD	29223	Prithvi Singh Azad	INC	17463

== See also ==
- List of constituencies of the Punjab Legislative Assembly
- Rupnagar district
