= Charanjit Singh Channi =

16th Chief Minister of Punjab

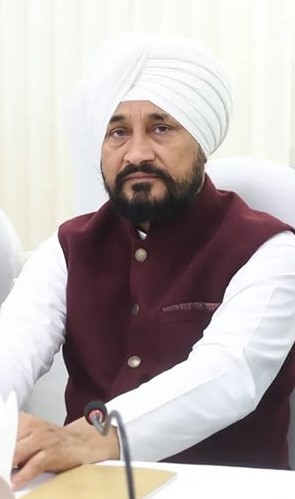

Member of Parliament, Lok Sabha
- Incumbent
- Assumed office 4 June 2024
- Preceded by: Sushil Kumar Rinku
- Constituency: Jalandhar, Punjab
- Majority: 1,75,993

16th Chief Minister of Punjab
- In office 20 September 2021 – 16 March 2022
- Governor: Banwarilal Purohit
- Deputy: Om Parkash Soni; Sukhjinder Singh Randhawa
- Preceded by: Amarinder Singh
- Succeeded by: Bhagwant Mann

Member of the Punjab Legislative Assembly
- In office 30 January 2007 – 17 March 2022
- Preceded by: Satwant Kaur
- Succeeded by: Charanjit Singh
- Constituency: Chamkaur Sahib

Cabinet Minister of Punjab
- In office 16 March 2017 – 18 September 2021
- Governor: V. P. Singh Badnore; Banwarilal Purohit
- Chief Minister: Amarinder Singh
- Ministry and Departments: Technical Education and Industrial Training; Employment Generation; Tourism and Cultural Affairs

Leader of the Opposition in the Punjab Legislative Assembly
- In office 11 December 2015 – 11 November 2016
- Chief Minister: Parkash Singh Badal
- Preceded by: Sunil Kumar Jakhar
- Succeeded by: Harvinder Singh Phoolka

Personal details
- Born: 15 March 1963 (age 63) Chamkaur, Punjab, India
- Citizenship: Indian
- Party: Indian National Congress
- Spouse: Dr. Kamaljit Kaur (m. 1991)
- Children: 2
- Education: Panjab University (B.A., LL.B., Ph.D.); I. K. Gujral Punjab Technical University (M.B.A.)

Charanjit Singh Channi (born 15 March 1963) is an Indian politician who served as the 16th Chief Minister of Punjab and also as leader of the house in assembly. He is a member of the Indian National Congress. He is serving as a Member of the Lok Sabha from Jalandhar Lok Sabha constituency since 4 June 2024. He was also Minister of Technical Education and Training in Second Amarinder Singh ministry and leader of the opposition in the Punjab Legislative Assembly.

== Early life and education ==
Channi was born in the village of Makrauna Kalan, Punjab. He studied law at Panjab University and has an MBA from PTU Jalandhar. He was awarded PhD in the 70th convocation of Panjab University (PU) by Vice-Chancellor Renu Vig in political science in topic related to the Indian National Congress with Professor Emanual Nahar as his guide. Now he is a PhD Holder in Political Science. He belongs to the Dalit Sikh Ramdasia Community.

== Personal life ==
Charanjit Singh Channi is married to Dr. Kamaljit Kaur, a medical professional. The couple have two sons. His elder son, Navjit Singh, has actively entered politics. In July 2023, he was elected as the District Youth Congress President of Rupnagar with a significant margin, securing 12,415 votes. His opponent received fewer than 1,500 votes, highlighting his strong support base.

=== Academic achievements ===
Channi's PhD thesis, titled "Indian National Congress: A Study of Central Organisation and Electoral Strategies in the Lok Sabha Elections since 2004," examines the party's central organisational structure and electoral strategies across multiple Lok Sabha elections since 2004, rather than focusing on a single electoral defeat.

== Early political career ==
=== Kharar municipal council ===
Channi started at the grassroots level by serving as a municipal councillor in Kharar, Punjab. This role helped him gain experience in local administration and governance. His leadership abilities were recognised, and he became the president of the Kharar municipal council in 2002, handling civic issues and development projects in the town.

=== Punjab Legislative Assembly ===
In 2007, Channi was elected to the Punjab Legislative Assembly as an independent candidate from the Chamkaur Sahib constituency, marking his entry into state-level politics. Then he joined Congress and retained his seat, demonstrating strong electoral support and political acumen during the State Assembly elections held in 2012 and 2017.

=== Leader of opposition ===
Channi served as the leader of opposition in the Punjab Legislative Assembly from 2015 to 2016, and this position provided him a platform to critique government policies and establish himself as a key Congress leader in Punjab.

=== Cabinet minister ===
Charanjit Singh Channi served as a cabinet minister in the Punjab government under Chief Minister Amarinder Singh. He was in charge of the Technical Education and Training portfolio, which involved overseeing technical institutions, vocational training programs, and skill development initiatives in the state. During his tenure, he focused on upgrading technical institutions in Punjab, ensuring that infrastructure and curriculum met modern industry standards.

=== Chief Minister of Punjab ===
In September 2021, he succeeded Captain Amarinder Singh as Chief Minister of Punjab after the latter's resignation. He is the first Dalit Sikh Chief Minister of Punjab. Commentators suggested that Punjab's large Dalit population and attempts by other parties to appeal to it may have influenced Congress's choice of Channi as Singh's successor.

On 26 September fifteen new ministers were sworn in; several ministers from the Second Amarinder Singh ministry were retained.

Soon after taking office, Channi made several policy announcements. On 21 September he promised action concerning a sacrilege case and said that the electricity bills of water works schemes would be waived and connections would be restored. On 23 September he stated "Class D" government jobs would be regularised; they were previously outsourced. In November 2021, Channi inaugurated his dream project Dastaan-e-Shahadat theme park at Chamkaur Sahib.

On 24 December 2021, Channi approved setting up Punjab State Commission for General Category. Congress leader Navjot Dahiya was appointed its first chairman. On 30 December 2021, Channi started free bus travel for students.

==== Contribution in Academic Research ====
Within his first 100 days, Channi's administration set up academic chairs in honour of notable figures like Bhagwan Valmiki, Guru Ravidass, Bhai Jaita (Baba Jiwan Singh), Dr. B.R. Ambedkar, and Bhai Makhan Shah Labana.

==== Enforcement measures to control illegal mining ====
In December 2021, Punjab CM Charanjit Singh Channi announced a fine of ₹25,000 for violations of sand mining norms. This was part of a broader effort to curb illegal extraction and to stabilise sand prices, which were capped at ₹5.50 per cubic foot. District officials were directed to maintain strict vigilance at mining sites, and Deputy Commissioners were instructed to offer the ₹25,000 reward to anyone who provided proof video or otherwise of norm violations. Additionally, panchayats seeking sand were to receive it free of cost, and only trucks (not tractor-trailers) were to be charged at the fixed rate. The CM also urged the reopening of previously closed legitimate mining sites and emphasised that no political interference would be tolerated.

==== 5 January 2022 episode ====
On 5 January 2022, in Firozpur district PM Narendra Modi's cavalcade was stranded for 15–20 minutes on flyover as protesting farmers blocked the Moga-Firozpur highway near Piarenana village far away while he was en route to Hussainiwala National Martyrs Memorial. Criticized by Bharatiya Janata Party, Channi denied any security lapse and stated he will recite Mahāmrityunjaya Mantra for PM's safety. In February 2022, Channi alleged that Modi has taken revenge by denying permission for his helicopter to fly from Chandigarh.

==== 2022 Punjab Legislative Assembly election ====
At the end of the legislative assembly term, Channi was appointed the Chief Ministerial candidate of Congress for the 2022 Punjab Assembly elections. Navjot Singh Sidhu was the other contender expecting to be the CM candidate. The official campaign was named Sada Channi, Sada CM (Our Channi, Our CM). Official campaign song Channi Karda Masle Hal by singer Surmandeep Mansa was launched in February 2022.

He contested the 2022 Punjab Legislative Assembly election from Chamkaur Sahib and Bhadaur legislative assembly constituencies, but lost both the seats to his opponents from the Aam Aadmi Party. On 11 March 2022, Channi submitted his resignation to Governor. On 21 March 2022, he met and congratulated his successor Bhagwant Mann.

=== Member of Parliament, Lok Sabha ===
Channi contested the 2024 Lok Sabha election from the Jalandhar constituency on a Congress ticket. He secured a landslide victory, defeating BJP's Sushil Kumar Rinku by a margin of 175,993 votes. He garnered a total of 390,053 votes, compared to Rinku's 214,060. This win not only showcased his strong electoral appeal but also marked a significant gain for the Congress party in Punjab.

== Electoral performance ==
=== Punjab Legislative Assembly ===
Year	Constituency	Party	Votes	%	Opponent	Opponent Party	Opponent Votes	%	Result	Margin	%
2022	Bhadaur	INC	26,409	21.09	Labh Singh Ugoke	AAP	63,967	51.07	Lost	-37,558	-29.98
2022	Chamkaur Sahib	INC	62,306	42.22	Dr. Charanjit Singh	AAP	70,248	47.60	Lost	-7,942	-5.38
2017	Chamkaur Sahib	INC	61,060	42.00	Dr. Charanjit Singh	AAP	48,752	33.53	Won	12,308	8.47
2012	Chamkaur Sahib	INC	54,640	41.26	Jagmeet Kaur	SAD	50,981	38.50	Won	3,659	2.76
2007	Chamkaur Sahib	Independent	37,946	42.00	Satwant Kaur	SAD	36,188	40.1	Won	1,758	1.9

=== Lok Sabha ===
Year	Constituency	Party	Votes	%	Opponent	Opponent Party	Opponent Votes	%	Result	Margin	%
2024	Jalandhar	INC	390,053	39.43	Sushil Kumar Rinku	BJP	214,060	21.64	Won	175,993	17.79

== See also ==
- List of chief ministers of Punjab
- Mayawati
- Ram Sundar Das
- Sushilkumar Shinde
- Jitan Ram Manjhi
