= Charanjit Singh =

Charanjit Singh may refer to:

- Charanjit Singh (cricketer) (born 1978), Indian cricketer
- Charanjit Singh (field hockey) (1931–2022), Indian field hockey player
- Charanjit Singh (musician) (1940–2015), Indian musician

== Politicians ==
- Dr. Charanjit Singh, Indian politician, Punjab MLA and eye surgeon
- Charanjit Singh Atwal (born 1937), Indian politician who was Deputy Speaker of the 14th Lok Sabha of India from 2004 to 2009
- Charanjit Singh Channi (born 1963), Indian politician and the former Chief Minister of Punjab
- Charanjit Singh Walia (c. 1935–2013), Indian politician who was elected to the Lok Sabha
