= Fazilka Assembly constituency =

Legislative Assembly constituency in Punjab State, India

Coordinates: 30.4°N 74.03°E

Fazilka
- Constituency No. 80 for the Punjab Legislative Assembly

Constituency details
- Country: India
- State: Punjab
- District: Fazilka
- Lok Sabha constituency: Firozpur
- Total electors: 177,520 (in 2022)
- Reservation: None

Member of Legislative Assembly
- 16th Punjab Legislative Assembly
- Incumbent Narinder Pal Singh Sawna
- Party: Aam Aadmi Party
- Elected year: 2022
- Preceded by: Davinder Singh Ghubaya

Fazilka Assembly constituency is one of the 117 Legislative Assembly constituencies of Punjab state in India. It is part of Fazilka district.

== Members of the Legislative Assembly ==
Most successful parties from Fazilka Vidhan Sabha
1. INC (8 Times) (50.0%)
2. BJP (4 Times) (25.0%)
3. AAP (1 Times) (6.25%)
4. BJS (1 Time) (6.25%)
5. IND (1 Time) (6.25%)
6. INC (I) (1 Time) (6.25%)

Election	Name	Party
1952	Wadhawa Ram	Independent
1957	Radha Krishan	Indian National Congress
1962	Satya Dev	Bharatiya Jana Sangh
1967	Radha Krishan	Indian National Congress
1969	Radha Krishan	Indian National Congress
1972	Kanshi Ram	Indian National Congress
1977	Kanshi Ram	Indian National Congress
1980	Kanshi Ram	Indian National Congress (Indira)
1985	Radha Krishan	Bharatiya Janata Party
1992	Mohinder Kumar	Indian National Congress
1997	Surjit Kumar Jyani	Bharatiya Janata Party
2002	Mohinder Kumar	Indian National Congress
2007	Surjit Kumar Jyani	Bharatiya Janata Party
2012	Surjit Kumar Jyani	Bharatiya Janata Party
2017	Davinder Singh Ghubaya	Indian National Congress
2022	Narinderpal Singh Sawna	Aam Aadmi Party

== Election results ==
=== 2027 ===
Punjab Assembly election, 2027: Fazilka
Party	Candidate	Votes	%	±%
AAP	Narinderpal Singh Sawna			
AD (WPD)				New entry
INC				
BSP				
SAD				
BJP				
NOTA	None of the above			
Majority				
Turnout				

=== 2022 ===
Punjab Assembly election, 2022: Fazilka
Party	Candidate	Votes	%	±%
AAP	Narinderpal Singh Sawna	63,157	43.70	
BJP	Surjit Kumar Jyani	35,437	24.50	
INC	Davinder Singh Ghubaya	29,096	20.20	
SAD	Hans Raj Jossan	13,717	9.45	
NOTA	None of the above	799	0.55	
SAD(A)	Harkiranjeet Singh Ramgarhia	588	0.4	
Majority		27,720	19.09	
Turnout		145,224	81.5	
Registered electors		177,520		

=== 2017 ===
Punjab Assembly election, 2017: Fazilka
Party	Candidate	Votes	%	±%
INC	Davinder Singh Ghubaya	39,276	27.5	
BJP	Surjit Kumar Jyani	39,011	27.3	
Independent	Rajdeep Kaur	38,135	26.7	
AAP	Samarbir Singh Sidhu	16,404	11.5	
NOTA	None of the Above	669	0.4	
Majority		265	0.2	
Turnout		142,404	87.1	
Registered electors		164,322		

== See also ==
- List of constituencies of the Punjab Legislative Assembly
- Fazilka district
