= Amandeep Kaur Arora =

Indian politician

Member of the Punjab Legislative Assembly for Moga
- Incumbent
- Assumed office 2022
- Preceded by: Harjot Kamal Singh

Personal details
- Party: Aam Aadmi Party

Amandeep Kaur Arora is an Indian politician. She was elected to the Moga Assembly constituency, Punjab in the 2022 Punjab Legislative Assembly election as a member of the Aam Aadmi Party.

== Member of Legislative Assembly ==
She represents the Moga Assembly constituency as MLA in Punjab Assembly. The Aam Aadmi Party gained a strong 79% majority in the sixteenth Punjab Legislative Assembly by winning 92 out of 117 seats in the 2022 Punjab Legislative Assembly election. MP Bhagwant Mann was sworn in as Chief Minister on 16 March 2022.

Committee assignments of Punjab Legislative Assembly

- Member (2022–23) Committee on Local Bodies
- Member (2022–23) Committee on Panchayati Raj Institutions

== Electoral performance ==
Punjab Assembly election, 2022: Moga
Party	Candidate	Votes	%	±%
AAP	Amandeep Kaur Arora	59,149	41.01	▲6.04
INC	Malvika Sood	38,234	26.51	▼9.68
SAD	Barjinder Singh Brar	28,333	19.64	▼5.65
BJP	Harjot Kamal Singh	10,606	7.35	New entry
SAD(A)	Manjeet Singh Mallah	3,803	2.64	▲2.64
NOTA	None of the above	925	0.64	▲0.10
Majority		20,915	14.5	▲13.28
Turnout		144,232	70.73	▼4.04
Registered electors		203,919		
AAP gain from INC				
