= Inderjit Kaur Mann =

Indian politician

Member of Punjab Legislative Assembly
- Incumbent
- Assumed office 2022
- Preceded by: Gurpratap Singh Wadala
- Constituency: Nakodar

Personal details
- Party: Aam Aadmi Party

Inderjit Kaur Mann (born 1969) is an Indian politician from Punjab. She was elected as an MLA from Nakodar Assembly constituency in Jalandhar District, winning the 2022 Punjab Legislative Assembly election representing the Aam Aadmi Party.

== Early life and education ==
Kaur is from Nakodar, Jalandhar District, Punjab. She married Sharnjit Singh. She completed her Bachelor of Arts in 1988 at Guru Nanak National College for Women, Nakodar.

== Assets and liabilities declared during elections ==
During the 2022 Punjab Legislative Assembly election, she declared Rs. 91,61,928 as an overall financial asset and Rs. 23,39,178 as financial liability.

== Member of Legislative Assembly ==
Kaur won from Nakodar Assembly constituency representing the Aam Aadmi Party in the 2022 Punjab Legislative Assembly election. She polled 42,868 votes and defeated her nearest rival, Gurpartap Singh Wadala of Shiromani Akali Dal, by a margin of 2,869 votes. She was a member of the Committee on Panchayati Raj Institutions and Committee on Co-operation and its allied activities for the year 2022-2023.

Punjab Assembly election, 2022: Nakodar
Party	Candidate	Votes	%	±%
AAP	Inderjit Kaur Mann	42,868	32.20	▲5.36
SAD	Gurpartap Singh Wadala	39,999	30.10	▼9.72
INC	Navjot Singh Dahiya	36,068	27.10	▲1.84
Independent	Mandeep Singh Samra	4,947	3.69	
SAD(A)	Subedar Major Singh Bhangala	4,073	3.04	
PLC	Shammi Kumar	2,042	1.50	
NOTA	None of the above	1,090	0.60	
Majority		2,869	2.1	
Turnout		134,163	68.8	
Registered electors		194,930		
