= Jalandhar West Assembly constituency =

Legislative Assembly constituency in Punjab State, India

Coordinates: 31.33°N 75.53°E

Jalandhar West
- Constituency No. 34 for the Punjab Legislative Assembly

Constituency details
- Country: India
- State: Punjab
- District: Jalandhar
- Lok Sabha constituency: Jalandhar
- Total electors: 171,632 (in 2022)
- Reservation: SC

Member of Legislative Assembly
- 16th Punjab Legislative Assembly
- Incumbent Mohinder Bhagat
- Party: Aam Aadmi Party
- Elected year: By-election 2024

Jalandhar West is one of the 117 Legislative Assembly constituencies of Punjab state in India. It is part of Jalandhar district and is reserved for candidates belonging to the Scheduled Castes.

== Members of the Legislative Assembly ==
Most successful parties from Jalandhar West Vidhan Sabha
1. INC (8 Times) (47.1%)
2. BJP (3 Times) (17.6%)
3. AAP (2 Times) (11.8%)
4. BJS (2 Times) (11.8%)
5. IND (1 Time) (5.88%)
6. INC (I) (1 Time) (5.88%)

Year	Member	Party
Jullundur City South West constituency
1952	Sita Devi	Indian National Congress
1957	Lala Jagat Narain	Independent
1962	Yash Paul	Indian National Congress
Jullundur South constituency
1967	Man Mohan Kalia	Bharatiya Jana Sangh
1969	Man Mohan Kalia	Bharatiya Jana Sangh
1972	Yash Pal	Indian National Congress
1977	Darshan Singh Kaypee	Indian National Congress
1980	Darshan Singh Kaypee	Indian National Congress (Indira)
1985	Mohinder Singh Kaypee	Indian National Congress
1992	Mohinder Singh Kaypee	Indian National Congress
1997	Chuni Lal Bhagat	Bharatiya Janata Party
2002	Mohinder Singh Kaypee	Indian National Congress
2007	Chuni Lal Bhagat	Bharatiya Janata Party
Jalandhar West constituency
2012	Chuni Lal Bhagat	Bharatiya Janata Party
2017	Sushil Kumar Rinku	Indian National Congress
2022	Sheetal Angural	Aam Aadmi Party
2024★	Mohinder Bhagat	Aam Aadmi Party

★ By elections

== Election results ==
=== 2027 ===
Punjab Assembly election, 2027: Jalandhar West
Party	Candidate	Votes	%	±%
AAP				
AD (WPD)				New entry
INC				
BSP				
SAD				
BJP				
NOTA	None of the above			
Majority				
Turnout				

=== 2024 by-election ===
Punjab Legislative Assembly by-election 2024: Jalandhar West
Party	Candidate	Votes	%	±%
AAP	Mohinder Bhagat	55,246	58.39	▲24.66
BJP	Sheetal Angural	17,921	18.94	▼9.87
INC	Surinder Kaur	16,757	17.71	▼12.36
SAD	Surjit Kaur	1,242	1.31	New
BSP	Binder Kumar	734	0.78	▼2.77
NOTA	None of the Above	687	0.73	▼0.06
SAD(A)	Sarabjit Singh Khalsa	662	0.7	▼0.76
Majority		37,325	39.45	▲35.75
Turnout		94,609	54.98	▼12.72
AAP hold		Swing		

=== 2022 ===
2022 Punjab Legislative Assembly election: Jalandhar West
Party	Candidate	Votes	%	±%
AAP	Sheetal Angural	39,213	33.73	▲19.69
INC	Sushil Kumar Rinku	34,960	30.07	▼19.26
BJP	Mohinder Bhagat	33,486	28.81	▼4.68
BSP	Anil Meena	4,125	3.55	
SAD(A)	Jasbir Singh Mann	1,701	1.46	
NOTA	None of the above	921	0.79	
Majority		4,253	3.7	
Turnout		116,247	67.70	
AAP gain from INC		Swing		

=== 2017 ===
2017 Punjab Legislative Assembly election: Jalandhar West
Party	Candidate	Votes	%	±%
INC	Sushil Kumar Rinku	53,983	49.33	▲9.83
BJP	Mohinder Bhagat	36,649	33.49	▼16.51
AAP	Darshan Lal Bhagat	15,364	14.04	new
Independent	Surinder Mahey	1,345	1.23	
NOTA	None of the above	1,155	1.06	
Majority		17,334	15.8	
Turnout		109,439	72.80	
INC gain from BJP		Swing		

=== 2012 ===
2012 Punjab Legislative Assembly election: Jalandhar West
Party	Candidate	Votes	%	±%
BJP	Chuni Lal Bhagat	48,207	51.30	▲1.30
INC	Suman Kaypee	36,864	39.02	▼0.48
BSP	Bachan Lal	4,692	15.0	▲9.20
Majority		11,343	12.08	
Turnout		93,891	68.8	

=== 2007 ===
2007 Punjab Legislative Assembly election: Jullundur South
Party	Candidate	Votes	%	±%
BJP	Chuni Lal Bhagat	56,775	50.00	
INC	Mohinder Singh Kaypee	44,860	39.50	
BSP	Raj Kumar Hans	6,546	5.8	
Majority		11,915	10.49	
Turnout		1,13,540	66.6	

== See also ==
- List of constituencies of the Punjab Legislative Assembly
- Jalandhar district
