= Nakodar Assembly constituency =

Legislative Assembly constituency in Punjab State, India

Coordinates: 31.13°N 75.48°E

Nakodar
- Constituency No. 31 for the Punjab Legislative Assembly

Constituency details
- Country: India
- State: Punjab
- District: Jalandhar
- Lok Sabha constituency: Jalandhar
- Established: 1951
- Total electors: 194,933
- Reservation: None

Member of Legislative Assembly
- 16th Punjab Legislative Assembly
- Incumbent Inderjit Kaur Mann
- Party: Aam Aadmi Party
- Elected year: 2022

Nakodar Assembly constituency is one of the 117 Legislative Assembly constituencies of Punjab state in India. It is part of Jalandhar district.

== Members of the Legislative Assembly ==
Most successful parties from Nakodar Vidhan Sabha
1. INC (11 Times) (61.1%)
2. SAD (3 Times) (16.7%)
3. IND (2 Times) (11.1%)
4. AAP (1 Time) (5.56%)
5. INC (I) (1 Time) (5.56%)

Year	Member	Party
1952	Sant Ram	Indian National Congress
1952	Swaran Singh	Indian National Congress
1957	Umrao Singh	Indian National Congress
1957	Sant Ram	Indian National Congress
1962	Darshan Singh	Indian National Congress
1967	D. Singh	Independent
1969	Darbara Singh	Independent
1972	Darbara Singh	Indian National Congress
1977	Umrao Singh	Indian National Congress
1980	Darbara Singh	Indian National Congress (Indira)
1985	Kuldeep Singh Wadala	Shiromani Akali Dal
1992	Umrao Singh	Indian National Congress
1997	Amarjit Singh Samra	Indian National Congress
2002	Amarjit Singh Samra	Indian National Congress
2007	Amarjit Singh Samra	Indian National Congress
2012	Gurpartap Singh Wadala	Shiromani Akali Dal
2017	Gurpartap Singh Wadala	Shiromani Akali Dal
2022	Inderjit Kaur Mann	Aam Aadmi Party

== Election results ==
=== 2027 ===
Punjab Assembly election, 2027: Nakodar
Party	Candidate	Votes	%	±%
AAP	Inderjit Kaur Mann			
AD (WPD)				New entry
INC				
BSP				
SAD				
BJP				New entry
NOTA	None of the above			
Majority				
Turnout				

=== 2022 ===
Punjab Assembly election, 2022: Nakodar
Party	Candidate	Votes	%	±%
AAP	Inderjit Kaur Mann	42,868	32.20	▲5.36
SAD	Gurpartap Singh Wadala	39,999	30.10	▼9.72
INC	Navjot Singh Dahiya	36,068	27.10	▲1.84
IND	Mandeep Singh Samra	4,947	3.69	
SAD(A)	Subedar Major Singh Bhangala	4,073	3.04	
PLC	Shammi Kumar	2,042	1.50	
NOTA	None of the above	1,090	0.60	
Majority		2,869	2.1	
Turnout		134,163	68.8	
Registered electors		194,930		

=== 2017 ===
Punjab Assembly election, 2017: Nakodar
Party	Candidate	Votes	%	±%
SAD	Gurpartap Singh Wadala	56,241	39.20	▼4.91
AAP	Sarwan Singh Hayer	37,834	26.40	New
INC	Jagbir Singh Brar	35,633	24.09	▼13.19
BSP	Taranpal Singh	8,284	5.82	
NOTA	None of the above	1,039	0.73	
Majority		18,407	12.9	
Turnout		142,283	77.44	
Registered electors		185,071		

=== 2012 ===
Punjab Legislative Assembly Election, 2012: Nakodar
Party	Candidate	Votes	%	±%
SAD	Gurpartap Singh Wadala	61,441	44.44	
INC	Amarjit Singh Samra	52,849	38.23	
BSP	Gurmail Singh Chumber	18,139	13.12	
Majority		8,592	6.2	
Turnout		138,236	81.93	
Registered electors		168,599		

== See also ==
- List of constituencies of the Punjab Legislative Assembly
- Jalandhar district
