= Sheetal Angural =

Indian politician

Member of the Punjab Legislative Assembly
- In office 2022–2024
- Preceded by: Sushil Kumar Rinku
- Succeeded by: Mohinder Bhagat
- Constituency: Jalandhar West
- Majority: Aam Aadmi Party

Personal details
- Born: Sheetal Jalandhar
- Party: Bharatiya Janata Party (till 2021; 2024-present)
- Other political affiliations: Aam Aadmi Party (2021-2024)
- Education: Matric
- Occupation: Businessman

Sheetal Angural is an Indian politician who represented the Jalandhar West Assembly constituency in the Punjab Legislative Assembly. He is a member of the Bharatiya Janata Party. He joined Bharatiya Janta Party in 27 March 2024, before the 2024 Indian General Election.

== Career ==
=== 2022 Punjab assembly elections ===
Sheetal Angural won 2022 Punjab assembly elections from Jalandhar West constituency by defeating Sushil Rinku of Indian National Congress by 4253 votes.

=== Joining BJP ===
Sheetal Angural joined the Bharatiya Janta Party on 27 March 2024.

After joining BJP, he fought the Jalandhar by-election in 2024 but he was defeated by Mohinder Bhagat his own ex-fellow from AAP, when the latter won the by-election by 37,325 votes.

== Member of Legislative Assembly ==
He represented the Jalandhar West Assembly constituency as MLA in Punjab Assembly till the 2024 by-elections.

Committee assignments of Punjab Legislative Assembly

- Member (2022–23) Committee on Welfare of Scheduled Castes, Scheduled Tribes and Backward Classes
- Member (2022–23) Committee on Government Assurances

== Electoral performance ==
=== 2024 by-election ===
Punjab Legislative Assembly by-election 2024: Jalandhar West
Party	Candidate	Votes	%	±%
AAP	Mohinder Pal Bhagat	55,246	58.39	▲24.66
BJP	Sheetal Angural	17,921	18.94	▼9.87
INC	Surinder Kaur	16,757	17.71	▼12.36
SAD	Surjit Kaur	1,242	1.31	New
BSP	Binder Kumar	734	0.78	▼2.77
NOTA	None of the Above	687	0.73	▼0.06
SAD(A)	Sarabjit Singh Khalsa	662	0.7	▼0.76
Majority		37,325	39.45	▲35.75
Turnout		94,609	54.98	▼12.72
AAP hold		Swing		

2022 Punjab Legislative Assembly election: Jalandhar West
Party	Candidate	Votes	%	±%
AAP	Sheetal Angural	39,213	33.73	▲19.69
INC	Sushil Kumar Rinku	34,960	30.07	▼19.26
BJP	Mohinder Bhagat	33,486	28.81	▼4.68
BSP	Anil Meena	4,125	3.55	
SAD(A)	Jasbir Singh Mann	1,701	1.46	
NOTA	None of the above	921	0.79	
Majority		4,253	3.7	
Turnout		1,16,247	67.70	
AAP gain from INC		Swing		

== Resignation Accepted ==
Punjab Assembly Speaker Kultar Singh Sandhwan has accepted his resignation on 30 May and a notification was issued on 31 May 2024. Further, now this seat is filled by the by-election won by Mohinder Bhagat from Aam Aadmi Party of Arvind Kejriwal and Bhagwant Maan.

State Legislative Assembly
Preceded by -	Member of the Punjab Legislative Assembly from Jalandhar West Assembly constituency 2022 – 2024	Succeeded by Mohinder Bhagat
