= Charanjit Singh (politician) =

Indian politician

Member of the Punjab Legislative Assembly
- Incumbent
- Assumed office 10 March 2022
- Preceded by: Charanjit Singh Channi
- Constituency: Chamkaur Sahib

Personal details
- Party: Aam Aadmi Party
- Profession: Doctor, Politician

Charanjit Singh is an Indian politician and eye surgeon. He is the MLA from Chamkaur Sahib Assembly constituency. He is a member of the Aam Aadmi Party.

== Member of Legislative Assembly ==
He represents the Chamkaur Sahib Assembly constituency as MLA in Punjab Assembly. The Aam Aadmi Party gained a strong 79% majority in the sixteenth Punjab Legislative Assembly by winning 92 out of 117 seats in the 2022 Punjab Legislative Assembly election by defeating outgoing cm Charanjit Singh Channi. MP Bhagwant Mann was sworn in as Chief Minister on 16 March 2022.

Committee assignments of Punjab Legislative Assembly

- Member (2022–23) Committee on Public Accounts
- Member (2022–23) Committee on Privileges

== Electoral performance ==
Assembly Election, 2022: Chamkaur Sahib
Party	Candidate	Votes	%	±%
AAP	Dr. Charanjit Singh	70,248	47.6	
INC	Charanjit Singh Channi	62,306	42.22	
SAD(A)	Lakhvir Singh	6,974	4.73	
BSP	Harmohan Singh Sandhu	3,802	2.58	
BJP	Darshan Singh Shivjot	2,514	1.7	New
NOTA	None of the above	713	0.48	
Majority		7,942	5.38	
Turnout		1,47,571		
Registered electors		1,97,330		
AAP gain from INC		Swing		

Assembly Election, 2017: Chamkaur Sahib
Party	Candidate	Votes	%	±%
INC	Charanjit Singh Channi	61,060	42.00	
AAP	Dr. Charanjit Singh	48,752	33.53	
SAD	Justice Nirmal Singh	31,452	21.63	
BSP	Rajinder Singh	1,610	1.11	
NOTA	None of the above	911	0.63	
Majority		12,308	8.47	
Turnout		1,45,399	77.78	
Registered electors		186,932		
INC hold		Swing		
