= Chuni Lal Bhagat =

Indian politician (1932–2026)

Minister for Medical Education & Research
- In office 2012–2017
- Preceded by: Tikshan Sud

Minister for Local Government
- In office 2012–2017
- Chief Minister: Parkash Singh Badal
- Preceded by: Manoranjan Kalia

MLA, Punjab
- In office 2012–2017
- Preceded by: New Constituency
- Succeeded by: Sushil Kumar Rinku
- Constituency: Jalandhar West
- In office 2007–2012
- Preceded by: Mohinder Singh Kaypee
- Succeeded by: Constituency underwent Boundary delimitation
- Constituency: Jalandhar South
- In office 1997–2002
- Preceded by: Mohinder Singh Kaypee
- Succeeded by: Mohinder Singh Kaypee
- Constituency: Jullundur (Jalandhar) South
- Chief Minister: Parkash Singh Badal

Personal details
- Born: 1 December 1932 Sialkot, Punjab Province, British India
- Died: 10 September 2026 (aged 93) Jalandhar, Punjab, India
- Party: Bharatiya Janta Party
- Spouse: Sheela Devi (died)
- Children: Four sons and four daughters

Chuni Lal Bhagat (1 December 1932 – 10 September 2026) was an Indian politician who was Local Government minister and was in charge of the Medical Education & Research department. He was a member of the Bharatiya Janta Party (BJP).

== Early life ==
Bhagat was born in Sialkot, British India on 1 December 1932, to Mehnga Ram and Rukmani Devi. He studied up to matriculation.

== Business ==
Bhagat had a business of exporting sports goods.

== Political career ==
Bhagat contended for election from Jullundur (Jalandhar) South in 1985 as an Independent candidate, but lost the election. In 1997, he again contested from Jalandhar South as the BJP candidate and became a member of the Punjab Vidhan Sabha. He again won from Jalandhar South in 2007. In 2012, Jalandhar South underwent boundary delimitation and he successfully contested from the new constituency Jalandhar West. He was elected Deputy Speaker of the Punjab assembly in 2011 after the resignation of Satpal Gosain. He was a cabinet minister and held the portfolio of Local Government and Medical Education & Research. He was the leader of the BJP legislative party in the assembly from 2012 to 2017. He didn't contest the election in 2017.

== Personal life and death ==
Bhagat was married to Sheela Devi. He had four sons and four daughters.

Bhagat died on 10 September 2026, at the age of 93.
