= Mohinder Bhagat =

Indian politician

Member of Punjab Legislative Assembly
- Incumbent
- Assumed office 13 July 2024
- Preceded by: Sheetal Angural
- Constituency: Jalandhar

Personal details
- Party: Aam Aadmi Party
- Other political affiliations: Bharatiya Janata Party
- Parent: Chunni Lal Bhagat (father)

Mohinder Bhagat is an Indian politician from Punjab. He is the elected MLA from Jalandhar West on an Aam Aadmi Party ticket. He was previously associated with the Bharatiya Janata Party.

Mohinder won the seat by a margin of 55k:17k votes in the by elections of 2024, defeating his own ex-colleague Sheetal Angural who joined Bhartiya Janta Party just before the Lok sabha elections 2024. The latter felt cheated by BJP during the elections that led to his huge defeat. Bhagat was previously a member of the Bharatiya Janata Party and had contested the 2017 and 2022 Punjab Legislative Assembly election on a BJP ticket from Jalandhar West Assembly constituency.
