= First battle of Chamkaur =

1702 battle

First Battle of Chamkaur
- Part of Mughal-Sikh Wars and Hill States-Sikh Wars
Date	1702
Location	Chamkaur
Result	Sikh victory: Mughal General Sayyad Beg defects to the Sikhs.

Belligerents
Khalsa (Sikhs)	Mughal Empire Bilaspur State

Commanders and leaders
Guru Gobind Singh	Sayyad Beg; Alif Khan Raja Ajmer Chand

Strength
500	10,000

Casualties and losses
Unknown	Unknown

The First battle of Chamkaur was fought in 1702 between the Sikhs and the Mughals. It resulted in a Sikh victory and the Mughal General Sayyad Beg defecting to the Sikhs with some troops.

== Before the battle ==
Guru Gobind Singh was making his way to Anandpur. He halted in Chamkaur, Mughal troops led by Generals Sayyad Beg and Alif Khan were marching from Lahore to Delhi. They were seen marching by Ajmer Chand. He asked the generals to join him and promised to pay them 2,000 rupees per day. The Mughal Army made an attack on the Guru.

== Battle ==
The Mughal Army and the army of Bilaspur State attacked. There was only a small army of Sikhs with the Guru. Sayyad Beg felt the aggression against the prevailing peace was unwarranted. With heavy fighting in progress he along with some of his troops joined the Sikhs. Alif Khan alone could not fight. He withdrew his troops and made his troops march to Delhi.

== Aftermath ==
The Guru along with his Sikhs returned to Anandpur and Sayyad Beg joined him.
