= 14th Punjab Assembly =

Punjab Legislative Assembly ਪੰਜਾਬ ਵਿਧਾਨ ਸਭਾ

Type
- Type: Unicameral
- Term limits: 5 years

History
- Preceded by: 13th Punjab Assembly
- Succeeded by: 15th Punjab Assembly

Leadership
- Speaker: Charanjit Singh Atwal, SAD
- Deputy Speaker: Dinesh Singh, BJP
- Leader of the House: Parkash Singh Badal, SAD
- Opposition House Leader: Charanjit Singh Channi, INC

Structure
- Seats: 117
- Political groups: SAD (60) BJP (12); INC (42) Independent (3)

Elections
- Voting system: First-past-the-post
- Last election: 30 January 2012

Meeting place
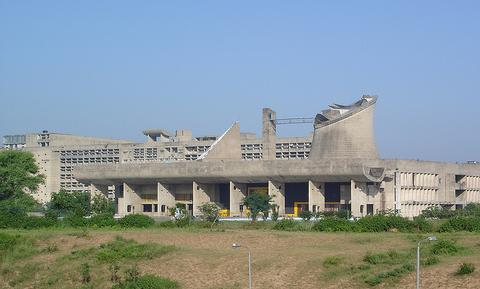
- Vidhan Bhavan, Chandigarh, India

Website
- Homepage

== Composition ==
Rank	Party	Seats Contested	Seats Won	% Votes	% Votes in Seats Cont.
1	Shiromani Akali Dal (SAD)	94	56	59.57	42.19
3	Bharatiya Janata Party (BJP)	23	12	7.15	39.73
2	Indian National Congress	117	48	41.02	41.02
4	Independent	-	3	7.13	
	Total		117		

== Committees ==
There were 13 committees for the years 2013-17.

Committees and Chairmen (2016–17)
Committee	Chairperson	Party
Committee on Public Accounts	Aruna Chaudhary	Indian National Congress
Committee on Estimates	Pargat Singh	Shiromani Akali Dal
Committee on Public Undertakings	Harpreet Singh	Shiromani Akali Dal
Committee on Welfare of Scheduled Castes, Scheduled Tribes and Backward Classes	S. R. Kaler	Shiromani Akali Dal
Committee on Privileges	Bibi Jagir Kaur	Shiromani Akali Dal
Committee on Government Assurances	Ashwani Kumar Sharma	Shiromani Akali Dal
Committee on Local Bodies and Panchayati Raj Institutions	Sarwan Singh Phillaur	Shiromani Akali Dal
Committee on Subordinate Legislation	Nirmal Singh	Shiromani Akali Dal
Committee on Papers Laid/to be Laid on the Table	Balbir Singh Sidhu	Indian National Congress
Committee on Library	Darshan Singh Kotfatta	Shiromani Akali Dal
Committee on Petitions	Manoranjan Kalia	Shiromani Akali Dal
House Committee	Dinesh Singh; Deputy speaker (Ex-Officio Chairperson)	Bharatiya Janata Party
Committee on Questions & References	Manpreet Singh Ayali	Shiromani Akali Dal

== Members of the Punjab Legislative Assembly elected in 2012 ==
The following is the list of the members elected in 2012 to the Punjab assembly:

No.	Constituency	Name of Member	Party
1	Sujanpur	Dinesh Singh	BJP
2	Bhoa (SC)	Seema Kumari	BJP
3	Pathankot	Ashwani Kumar Sharma	BJP
4	Gurdaspur	Gurbachan Singh Babbehali	SAD
5	Dina Nagar (SC)	Aruna Chaudhary	INC
6	Qadian	Charanjit Kaur Bajwa	INC
7	Batala	Ashwani Sekhri	INC
8	Sri Hargobindpur (SC)	Des Raj Dhugga	SAD
9	Fatehgarh Churian	Tripat Rajinder Singh Bajwa	INC
10	Dera baba nanak	Sukhjinder Singh Randhawa	INC
11	Ajnala	Bonny Amarpal Singh Ajnala	SAD
12	Raja sansi	Sukhbinder Singh Sarkaria	INC
13	Majitha	Bikram Singh Majithia (E)	SAD
14	Jandiala (SC)	Baljit Singh Jalal Usma	SAD
15	Amritsar North	Anil Joshi	BJP
16	Amritsar West (SC)	Raj Kumar Verka (E)	INC
17	Amritsar Central	Om Parkash Soni (E)	INC
18	Amritsar East	Navjot Kaur Sidhu (E/W)	AWAAZ E PUNJAB
19	Amritsar South	Inderbir Singh Bolaria (E)	INC
20	Attari (SC)	Gulzar Singh Ranike (E)	SAD
21	Tarn taran	Harmeet Singh Sandhu	SAD
22	Khem karan	Virsa Singh Valtoha	SAD
23	Patti	Adesh Partap Singh Kairon	SAD
24	Khadoor Sahib	Ravinder Singh Brahmpura replaced Ramanjit Singh Sikki on 16.02.2016	SAD
25	Baba bakala (SC)	Manjit Singh Manna Mianwind (E)	SAD
26	Bholath	Bibi Jagir Kaur	SAD
27	Kapurthala	Rana Gurjit Singh	INC
28	Sultanpur lodhi	Navtej Singh	INC
29	Phagwara (SC)	Som Parkash	BJP
30	Phillaur (SC)	Avinash Chander	SAD
31	Nakodar	Gurpartap Singh Wadala	SAD
32	Shahkot	Ajit Singh Kohar	SAD
33	Kartarpur (SC)	Sarwan Singh	SAD
34	Jalandhar West (SC)	Chuni Lal Bhagat	BJP
35	Jalandhar central	Manoranjan Kalia	BJP
36	Jalandhar North	K.D.Bhandari	BJP
37	Jalandhar Cantt	Pargat Singh	INC
38	Adampur (SC)	Sh. Pawan Kumar Tinu	SAD
39	Mukerian	Rajnish Kumar	Independent
40	Dasuya	Amarjit Singh	BJP
41	Urmar	Sangat Singh	INC
42	Sham chaurasi (SC)	Mohinder Kaur Josh	SAD
43	Hoshiarpur	Sunder Sham Arora	INC
44	Chabbewal (SC)	Sohan Singh Thandal	SAD
45	Garhshankar	Surinder Singh Bhulewal Rathan	SAD
46	Banga (SC)	Tarlochan Singh	INC
47	Nawan shahr	Guriqbal Kaur	INC
48	Balachaur	Chaudhary Nand Lal	SAD
49	Anandpur Sahib	Madan Mohan Mittal	BJP
50	Rupnagar	Dr Daljeet Singh Cheema	SAD
51	Chamkaur Sahib (SC)	Charanjit Singh Channi	INC
52	Kharar	Jagmohan Singh	INC
53	S.A.S.Nagar	Balbir Singh Sidhu	INC
54	Bassi Pathana (SC)	Justice Nirmal Singh	SAD
55	Fatehgarh Sahib	Kuljit Singh Nagra	INC
56	Amloh	Randeep Singh	INC
57	Khanna	Gurkirat Singh	INC
58	Samrala	Amrik Singh	INC
59	Sahnewal	Sharanjit Singh Dhillon	SAD
60	Ludhiana East	Ranjit Singh Dhillon	SAD
61	Ludhiana South	Balwinder Singh Bains	INC
62	Atam Nagar	Simarjit Singh Bains	INC
63	Ludhiana central	Surinder Kumar Dawar	INC
64	Ludhiana West	Bharat Bhushan Ashu	INC
65	Ludhiana North	Rakesh Panday	INC
66	Gill (SC)	Darshan Singh Shivalik	SAD
67	Payal (SC)	Charanjit Singh Atwal	SAD
68	Dakha	Manpreet Singh Ayali	SAD
69	Raikot (SC)	Gurcharan Singh	INC
70	Jagraon (SC)	S R Kaler	SAD
71	Nihal Singh Wala (SC)	Rajwinder Kaur	SAD
72	Bhagha Purana	Maheshinder Singh	SAD
73	Moga	Joginder Pal Jain	INC
74	Dharamkot	Tota Singh	SAD
75	Zira	Hari Singh	SAD
76	Firozpur City	Parminder Singh Pinki	INC
77	Firozpur Rural (SC)	Joginder Singh Alias Jindu	SAD
78	Guru har sahai	Gurmeet Singh Sodhi	INC
79	Jalalabad	Sukhbir Singh Badal	SAD
80	Fazilka	Surjit Kumar Jyani	BJP
81	Abohar	Sunil Kumar Jakhar	INC
82	Balluana (SC)	Gurtej Singh	SAD
83	Lambi	Parkash Singh Badal	SAD
84	Gidderbaha	Amrinder Singh Raja Warring	INC
85	Malout (SC)	Harpreet Singh	SAD
86	Muktsar	Karan Kaur	INC
87	Faridkot	Deep Malhotra	SAD
88	Kotkapura	Mantar Singh Brar	SAD
89	Jaitu (SC)	Joginder Singh	INC
90	Rampura Phul	Sikander Singh Maluka	SAD
91	Bhucho Mandi (SC)	Ajaib Singh Bhatti	INC
92	Bathinda Urban	Sarup Chand Singla	SAD
93	Bathinda Rural (SC)	Darshan Singh Kotfatta	SAD
94	Talwandi Sabo	Jeetmohinder Singh Sidhu	SAD
95	Maur	Janmeja Singh	SAD
96	Mansa	Prem Mittal	SAD
97	Sardulgarh	Ajit Inder Singh	INC
98	Budhlada (SC)	Chatin Singh	SAD
99	Lehra	Rajinder Kaur Bhattal	INC
100	Dirba (SC)	Sant Balvir Singh Ghunas	SAD
101	Sunam	Parminder Singh Dhindsa	SAD
102	Bhadaur (SC)	Mohammed Sadique	INC
103	Barnala	Kewal Singh Dhillon	INC
104	Mehal kalan (SC)	Harchand Kaur	INC
105	Malerkotla	F. Nesara Khatoon (Farzana Alam)	SAD
106	Amargarh	Iqbal Singh Jhundan	SAD
107	Dhuri	Gobind Singh Longowal	SAD
108	Sangrur	Parkash Chand Garg	SAD
109	Nabha (SC)	Sadhu Singh	INC
110	Patiala Rural	Brahm Mohindra	INC
111	Rajpura	Hardyal Singh Kamboj	INC
112	Dera bassi	N.K. Sharma	SAD
113	Ghanaur	Harpreet Kaur Mukhmailpura	SAD
114	Sanour	Lal Singh	INC
115	Patiala	Preneet Kaur	INC
116	Samana	Surjit Singh Rakhra	SAD
117	Shutrana (SC)	Vaninder Kaur Loomba	SAD

== Next Elections ==
- Punjab Legislative Assembly election, 2017 to be held for electing 15th Punjab Legislative Assembly
