= Narinder Pal Singh Sawna =

Indian politician

MLA, Punjab Legislative Assembly
- Incumbent
- Assumed office 2022
- Constituency: Fazilka
- Majority: Aam Aadmi Party

Personal details
- Party: Aam Aadmi Party

Narinder Pal Singh Sawna is an Indian politician and the MLA representing the Fazilka Assembly constituency in the Punjab Legislative Assembly. He is a member of the Aam Aadmi Party. He was elected as the MLA in the 2022 Punjab Legislative Assembly election. He was earlier in Shiromani Akali Dal and joined AAP in 2021.

== Member of Legislative Assembly ==
He represents the Fazilka Assembly constituency as MLA in Punjab Assembly. The Aam Aadmi Party gained a strong 79% majority in the sixteenth Punjab Legislative Assembly by winning 92 out of 117 seats in the 2022 Punjab Legislative Assembly election. MP Bhagwant Mann was sworn in as Chief Minister on 16 March 2022.

Committee assignments of Punjab Legislative Assembly

- Member (2022–23) Committee on Public Accounts
- Member (2022–23) Committee on Questions & References

== Electoral performance ==
State Legislative Assembly
Preceded by -	Member of the Punjab Legislative Assembly from Fazilka Assembly constituency 2022 –	Incumbent
