= Punjab Assembly Committee on Panchayati Raj Institutions =

Indian Legislative committee

Committee on Panchayati Raj Institutions
Department Related Committee
- 16th Punjab Assembly
- State: Punjab

Leadership
- Chaiperson: Gurmeet Singh Khudian
- Chairperson party: Aam Aadmi Party
- Appointer: Punjab Assembly speaker

Structure
- Seats: 13
- Political Parties: AAP (11); INC (2)
- Election criteria: The members are elected every year from amongst its members of house according to the principle of proportional representation.
- Tenure: 1 Year

Jurisdiction
- Purpose: Legislative oversight of the Panchayati Raj Institutions (Rural local Bodies)

Rules & Procedure
- Applicable rules: Article 208 of the Constitution of India; Section 32 of the States Reorganisation Act, 1956; Rules 232(1) and 2(b) of Rules of Procedure and Conduct of Business in Punjab Legislative Assembly

Committee on Panchayati Raj Institutions of Punjab Legislative Assembly is constituted annually for a one year period from among the members of the Assembly. This Committee consists of thirteen members.

== Overview ==
According to the Punjab Government Gazette, 2021 the functions of the committee are defined below.

(1) There shall be a Committee on Panchayati Raj Institutions consisting of not more than thirteen Members for the examination of the working of the Panchayati Raj Institutions which Shall mean and include Panchayat Samities and Zila Parishads.

(2) The committee shall be nominated by the Speaker and the term of office of the Members of the Committee shall be one year.

Functions of the Committee

The functions of the Committee shall be

(a) to examine the audit reports and accounts of the Panchayati Raj Institutions as may be selected by the Committee;
(b) to examine the reports, if any, of the Examiner, Local Fund Accounts laid on the Table of the House;
(c) to examine in the context of autonomy, whether affairs of the Panchayati Raj Institutions are being managed in accordance with the provisions of law;
(d) to examine any other aspect of the working of any Panchayati Raj Institutions, as may be referred to it by the Speaker.
(e) to examine the annual technical inspection reports of the Comptroller and Auditor General on Panchayati Raj Institutions, if any, laid on the Table of the House.

Provided that the Committee shall not examine and investigate any of the following, namely :-

(i) matters of major Government policy as distinct from the working of the Panchayati Raj Institutions;
(ii) matters relating to day-to-day administration of Panchayati Raj Institutions; and
(iii) matters for the consideration of which machinery is established by any special statute under which the Panchayati Raj Institutions are established.

== Appointment ==
The speaker appoints the committee and its members every year for a one year term according to the powers conferred by Article 208 of the Constitution of India read with section 32 of the States Reorganisation Act, 1956 (37 of 1956), and in pursuance of Rules 232(1) and 2(b) of the Rules of Procedure and Conduct of Business in the Punjab Legislative Assembly.

== Current members ==
For the one year period starting May 2022, the Committee on Panchayati Raj Institutions of 16th Punjab Assembly had following members:

Committee on Panchayati Raj Institutions (2022–23)
Sr. No.	Name	Post	Party
1	Gurmeet Singh Khudian	Chairperson	AAP
2	Amandeep Kaur Arora	Member	AAP
3	Barindermeet Singh Pahra	Member	INC
4	Dinesh Kumar Chadha	Member	AAP
5	Inderjit Kaur Mann	Member	AAP
6	Jagsir Singh	Member	AAP
7	Jaswinder Singh Ramdas	Member	AAP
8	Kuljit Singh Randhawa	Member	AAP
9	Manwinder Singh Giaspura	Member	AAP
10	Rajinder Pal Kaur	Member	AAP
11	Santosh Kumari Kataria	Member	AAP
12	Sukhpal Singh Khaira	Member	INC
13	Tarunpreet Singh Sond	Member	AAP

== Chairpersons ==
Since 2021, Punjab Assembly 'Committee Local Bodies and Panchayati Raj Institutions' has been split into committees, namely 'Committee on Local Bodies' and 'Committee on Panchayati Raj Institutions'.

Chairpersons for Local Bodies and Panchayati Raj Institutions Committee
Term of office	Terms	Name	Political party
2010–11	1	Surjit Kumar Jiyani	Bharatiya Janata Party
2017–18	1	Balbir Singh Sidhu	Indian National Congress
2018–21	3	Harpartap Singh Ajnala	Indian National Congress

Chairpersons for Committee on Panchayati Raj Institutions
Term of office	Terms	Name	Political party
2021–22	1	Harpartap Singh	Indian National Congress
2022–23	1	Gurmeet Singh Khudian	Aam Aadmi Party

== Previous members ==
=== 15th Punjab Assembly ===
Following were the members in the 15th Punjab Assembly (2017-2022)

Committee on Local Bodies and Panchayati Raj Institutions (2020–21)
Sr. No.	Name	Post	Party
1	Harpartap Singh Ajnala	Chairperson	INC
2	Darshan Singh Brar	Member	INC
3	Davinder Singh Ghubaya	Member	INC
4	Madan Lal Jalalpur	Member	INC
5	Manpreet Singh Ayali	Member	SAD
6	Nazar Singh Manshahia	Member	INC
7	Parminder Singh Dhindsa	Member	SAD(S)
8	Pritam Singh Kotbhai	Member	INC
9	Kulbir Singh Zira	Member	INC
10	Amarjit Singh Sandoha	Member	AAP
11	Sangat Singh Gilzian	Member	INC
12	Barindermeet Singh Pahra	Member	INC
13	Surjit Singh Dhiman	Member	INC
