= Davinder Singh Ghubaya =

Indian politician

Davinder Singh Ghubaya is an Indian politician associated with the Indian National Congress. He represented the Fazilka Assembly constituency in the Punjab Legislative Assembly from 2017 to 2022. He was elected in the 2017 Punjab Legislative Assembly election, defeating the incumbent Bharatiya Janata Party legislator and cabinet minister Surjit Kumar Jyani by 265 votes. At the age of 25, he became one of the youngest members elected to the Punjab Legislative Assembly.

== Early life and education ==
Ghubaya is the son of Sher Singh Ghubaya, a politician who represented the Firozpur parliamentary constituency in the Lok Sabha. His family has a political background in the Fazilka and Jalalabad region of Punjab.

According to his 2017 election affidavit, Ghubaya had completed a Bachelor of Arts in Economics at Panjab University, Chandigarh. Contemporary newspaper reports also described him as pursuing postgraduate studies in economics at the university.

== Political career ==
=== 2017 Punjab Legislative Assembly election ===
Ghubaya contested the 2017 Punjab Legislative Assembly election from the Fazilka Assembly constituency as a candidate of the Indian National Congress. He had joined the Congress in December 2016 after his father, Sher Singh Ghubaya, fell out with the Shiromani Akali Dal leadership.

He won the election with 39,276 votes, defeating the incumbent BJP legislator and Punjab cabinet minister Surjit Kumar Jyani, who received 39,011 votes. The victory margin was 265 votes. Independent candidate Rajdeep Kaur finished third with 38,135 votes.

At 25, Ghubaya became the youngest candidate elected to the Punjab Legislative Assembly in the 2017 election. His victory was reported as being influenced by support from the Rai Sikh community and the wider Congress electoral wave in Punjab.

== 2022 Punjab Legislative Assembly election ==
Ghubaya contested the 2022 Punjab Assembly election again from Fazilka on a Congress ticket but did not retain the constituency.

== See also ==
- Rai Sikh
