= Punjab Assembly Committee on Questions & References =

Indian Legislative committee

Committee on Questions & References
Committee of the House
- 16th Punjab Assembly
- State: Punjab

Leadership
- Chaiperson: Baljinder Kaur
- Chairperson party: Aam Aadmi Party
- Appointer: Punjab Assembly speaker

Structure
- Seats: 9
- Political Parties: AAP (8); INC (1)
- Election criteria: The members are elected every year from amongst its members of house according to the principle of proportional representation.
- Tenure: 1 Year

Jurisdiction
- Purpose: Legislative oversight of the questions, replies and debates in the Assembly

Rules & Procedure
- Applicable rules: Article 208 of the Constitution of India section 32 of the States Reorganisation Act, 1956; Rules 232(1) and 2(b) of Rules of Procedure and Conduct of Business in Punjab Legislative Assembly

Punjab Assembly Committee on Questions & References of Punjab Legislative Assembly is constituted annually for a one year period from among the members of the Assembly. This Committee consists of nine members.

== Appointment ==
The speaker appoints the committee and its members every year for a one year term according to the powers conferred by Article 208 of the Constitution of India read with section 32 of the States Reorganisation Act, 1956 (37 of 1956), and in pursuance of Rules 232(1) and 2(b) of the Rules of Procedure and Conduct of Business in the Punjab Legislative Assembly.

== Members ==
For the one year period starting May 2022, the Committee on Questions & References of 16th Punjab Assembly had following members:

Committee on Questions & References (2022–23)
Sr. No.	Name	Post	Party
1	Baljinder Kaur	Chairperson	AAP
2	Ashok Parashar (Pappi)	Member	AAP
3	Daljit Singh Grewal (Bhola)	Member	AAP
4	Inderbir Singh Nijjar	Member	AAP
5	Jagdeep Singh Kaka Brar	Member	AAP
6	Naresh Kataria	Member	AAP
7	Narinder Pal Singh Sawna	Member	AAP
8	Rajneesh Kumar Dahiya	Member	AAP
9	Tript Rajinder Singh Bajwa	Member	INC

== Chairpersons ==
Tenure	Terms	Name	Political party
2014-15	1	Manoranjan Kalia	Bharatiya Janata Party
2016-17	1	Manpreet Singh Ayali	Shiromani Akali Dal
2021-22	1	Parminder Singh Pinki	Indian National Congress
2022-23	1	Baljinder Kaur	Aam Aadmi Party

== Previous members ==
=== 2021-2022 ===
Committee on Questions & References (2021–22)
Sr. No.	Name	Post	Party
1.	Sardar Parminder Singh Pinki	Chairperson	INC
2.	Rupinder Kaur Ruby	Member	INC
3.	Shri Darshan Singh Brar	Member	INC
4.	Sardar Barindermeet Singh Pahra	Member	INC
5.	Sardar Dilraj Singh	Member	INC
6.	Sardar Kulbir Singh Zira	Member	INC
7.	Sardar Jagdev Singh	Member	INC
8.	Sardar Davinder Singh Ghubaya	Member	INC
9.	Sardar Pritam Singh Kotbhai	Member	INC

=== 2019-2020 ===
Committee on Questions & References (2019–20)
Sr. No.	Name	Post	Party
1.	Sardar Inderbir Singh Bolaria	Chairperson	INC
2.	Shri Angad Singh	Member	INC
3.	Shri Baldev Singh Khaira	Member	INC
4.	Shri Budh Ram	Member	INC
5.	Sardar Hardev Singh Laadi	Member	INC
6.	Shri Madan Lal Jalalpur	Member	INC
7.	Sardar Manjit Singh	Member	INC
8.	Sardar Rajinder Singh	Member	INC
9.	Sardar Sukhpal Singh Bhullar	Member	INC

=== 2018-2019 ===
Committee on Questions & References (2018–19)
Sr. No.	Name	Post	Party
1.	Sardar Inderbir Singh Bolaria	Chairperson	INC
2.	Sardar Amarjit Singh Sandoa	Member	INC
3.	Sardar Baldev Singh	Member	INC
4.	Sardar Parminder Singh Dhindsa	Member	INC
5.	Shri Rajnish Kumar Babbi	Member	INC
6.	Sardar Sangat Singh Gilzian	Member	INC
7.	Shri. Sunil Dutti	Member	INC
8.	Sardar Surjit Singh Dhiman	Member	INC
9.	Sardar Hardev Singh Laadi	Member	INC

=== 2017-2018 ===
Committee on Questions & References (2017–18)
Sr. No.	Name	Post	Party
1.	Rana Gurmeet Singh Sodhi	Chairperson	INC
2.	Sardar Amarjit Singh Sandoa	Member	INC
3.	Sardar Gurkirat Singh Kotli	Member	INC
4.	Sardar Navtej Singh Cheema	Member	INC
5.	Sardar Parminder Singh Pinki	Member	INC
6.	Shri. Pawan Kumar Tinu	Member	INC
7.	Sardar Sukhpal Singh Bhullar	Member	INC
8.	Smt Sarvjit Kaur Manuke	Member	INC
9.	Shri. Vijay Inder Singla	Member	INC
