= Amarjit Singh Samra =

Indian politician

MLA, Punjab
- In office 1994 – 2012
- Preceded by: Umaro Singh
- Succeeded by: Gurpartap Singh Wadala
- Constituency: Nakodar

Minister for Revenue and Rehabilitation
- In office 2002 - 2007
- Chief Minister: Capt. Amarinder Singh
- Preceded by: Sewa Singh Sekhwan
- Succeeded by: Ajit Singh Kohar

Personal details
- Born: 24 November 1943 (age 82) Samrai
- Party: Indian National Congress
- Website: http://amarjitsamra.com

Amarjit Singh Samra was an Indian politician and a member of Indian National Congress. He was Minister for Revenue and Rehabilitation in the Punjab Government from 2002 to 2007.

== Early life ==
He was born on 24 November 1943 in Samrai near Jalandhar in Punjab, India. His father's name is Ujagar Singh Samra.

== Political career ==
Samra started his career as a sarpanch of Samrai in 1964. In 1975 he became chairman of development block or panchayat samiti Rurka Kalan. He remained sarpanch till 1993. He was elected to the Punjab Legislative Assembly in 1994 in by election from Nakodar. He was re-elected in 1997, 2002 and 2007. In the 2002 Congress government he was made Minister for Revenue and Rehabilitation.
