= Sushil Kumar Rinku =

Indian politician from Punjab

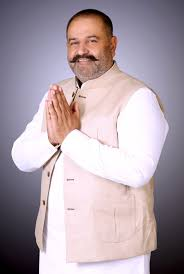

Member of Parliament, Lok Sabha
- In office 13 May 2023 – 4 June 2024
- Preceded by: Santokh Singh Chaudhary
- Succeeded by: Charanjit Singh Channi
- Constituency: Jalandhar

Member of the Punjab Legislative Assembly
- In office 2017–2022
- Succeeded by: Sheetal Angural
- Constituency: Jalandhar West

Personal details
- Born: 5 June 1975 (age 51) Jalandhar, Punjab, India
- Party: Bharatiya Janata Party (2024–present)
- Other political affiliations: Aam Aadmi Party (2023-2024); Indian National Congress (till 2023)
- Spouse: Sunita Rinku
- Education: DAV College, Jalandhar
- Profession: Politician

Sushil Kumar Rinku (born 5 June 1975) is an Indian politician and a member of the Bharatiya Janata Party. He was a member of parliament from the Jalandhar constituency after winning in a 2023 by-election. In 2024, he lost to Congress candidate and former Chief Minister of Punjab Charanjit Singh Channi after joining BJP. He previously belonged to the Aam Aadmi Party and Indian National Congress. In 2017, he was elected as a member of the Punjab Legislative Assembly from Jalandhar West on Indian National Congress ticket.

Sushil Kumar is high school graduate and had 1.62 crores in cash or assets as per his nomination filing.

== Political career ==
He won the Jalandhar West on an INC ticket, he beat the Bharatiya Janata Party candidate Mohinder Bhagat by over 17,334 Votes.

Sushil Kumar Rinku, who joined the Aam Aadmi Party (AAP) few days ahead of the Jalandhar parliamentary by-election, on May 13 won the election as an AAP candidate by defeating the rival Congress party.

After resigning from membership of Aam Admi Party, he joined BJP in presence of Vinod Tawde and Sunil Jakhar on 27 March 2024.

He lost as a Bharatiya Janata Party candidate to former CM Charanjit Singh Channi by 1,75,993 votes in 2024 Indian general election.

Lok Sabha
Preceded by Santokh Singh Chaudhary	Member of Parliament for Jalandhar; 2023 – 2024	Succeeded by Charanjit Singh Channi
