= Gurpartap Singh Wadala =

Indian politician

MLA, Punjab
- In office 2012 - 2022
- Preceded by: Amarjit Singh Samra
- Constituency: Nakodar

Personal details
- Party: Shiromani Akali Dal (Punar Surjit)
- Other political affiliations: Shiromani Akali Dal

Gurpartap Singh Wadala is an Indian politician and belongs to the Shiromani Akali Dal. He is a member of Punjab Legislative Assembly and represents Nakodar. He is son of former Akali MLA Kuldip Singh Wadala.

== Educational qualification ==
Wadala did B.E. (Electrical) from Guru Nanak Engineering College Ludhiana.

== Political career ==
Wadala was elected to Punjab Legislative Assembly from Nakodar in 2012. He replaced his father as Akali Dal candidate from Nakodar.

In 2017 Elections he won the Nakodar Assembly seat by defeating Congress candidate Jagbir Singh Brar and AAP candidate Sarwan Singh Hayer, hence winning his second assembly election in as many attempts. Earlier in 2012, he had defeated Amarjit Singh Samra who was elected to the Punjab Legislative Assembly in 1994 in by election from Nakodar and remained undefeated in 1997, 2002 and 2007 assembly elections as well.
