= Harjot Kamal Singh =

Indian politician

Harjot Kamal Singh (born 16 March 1967) is an Indian politician. He was a member of the Punjab Legislative Assembly representing the Moga Constituency Assembly during 2017-2022 and is a member of Bharatiya Janta Party. Qualifications; BAMS, MBA. By profession, he is an Ayurveda doctor and runs a rural hospital named "Bhai Bishan Singh Memorial Bharj Hospital" at Ajitwal (Moga).

== Political career ==
Harjot Kamal is connected with Bharatiya Janata Party. He was a Member of the Legislative Assembly (MLA) of Moga, Punjab. He has remained secretary of Punjab Pradesh Congress Committee (PPCC) & also Punjab State Chairman of Social Media & IT Cell of Punjab Pradesh Congress Committee (PPCC). He was the district general secretary of National Students' Union of India during his student life from 1987 to 1990. Later, he joined the Youth Congress and was the secretary of Punjab Youth Congress from 2000 to 2004, followed by general secretary of Pradesh Youth Congress from 2005 to 2007. He is the state organizing secretary of the National Integrated Medical Association (NIMA) as well.

== Posts held ==
Harjot Kamal Singh was a general secretary of Shri Guru Nanak Dev Educational Society (Regd.) Moga w.e.f. 1995, he is running various educational colleges and institutions such as Industrial Training Institute (ITI), Polytechnic, Management, college of education Institutions in the name of "Lala Lajpat Rai". He is a Management Member of G.G.S Technical Institutes.
