= Surjit Kumar Jyani =

Indian politician

MLA, Punjab
- In office 1997 - 2002
- Preceded by: Mohinder Kumar
- Succeeded by: Mohinder Kumar
- Constituency: Fazilka
- In office 2007 - 2017
- Preceded by: Mohinder Kumar
- Succeeded by: Davinder Singh Ghubaya
- Constituency: Fazilka

Minister of Forest & Wildlife and Labour
- In office 2007-2012
- Chief Minister: Parkash Singh Badal
- Preceded by: Tikshan Sud

Health Minister
- In office 2012-2017
- Chief Minister: Parkash Singh Badal
- Preceded by: Tikshan Sud

Personal details
- Party: Bharatiya Janta Party
- Children: 2 sons

Surjit Kumar Jyani is an Indian politician who served as health minister in the Punjab Government. He has also served as Minister for Forest & Wildlife & Labour. He is member of Bharatiya Janta Party (BJP).

== Early life ==
Jyani comes from a Hindu Jat family and his mother tongue is Bagri. His grandfather migrated from Rajasthan during British Raj .

== Political career ==
He first became a member of Punjab Vidhan Sabha from Fazilka in 1997. In 2007 and 2012, he was re-elected from Fazilka.
