= Chamkaur Sahib =

- Sri Chamkaur Sahib
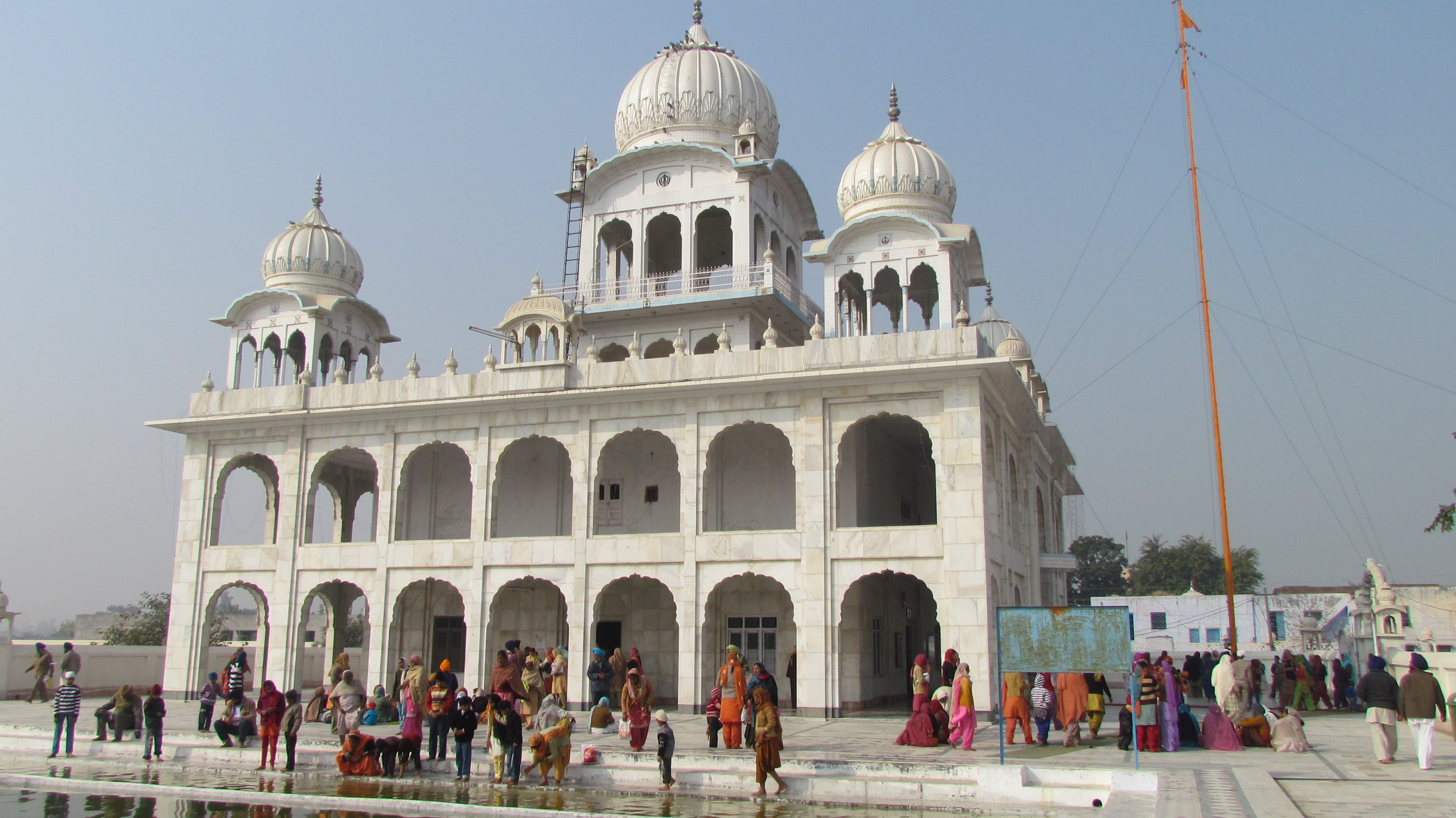
- Gurdwara Katalgarh Sahib, Gurdwara Sri Damdama Sahib city Chamkaur Sahib

- Location within Punjab Location within India
- Coordinates: 30°53′31″N 76°25′27″E
- Country: India
- State: Punjab
- District: Rupnagar
- Elevation: 278 m (912 ft)

Population (2011)
  - Total: 13,920

Languages
  - Official: Punjabi
  - Native: Puadhi
- Time zone: GMT +5.5
- Postcode: 140112
- Vehicle registration: PB-71

Chamkaur Sahib is a Sub Divisional town in the district of Rupnagar in the Indian State of Punjab.

== History ==
It is famous for the First Battle of Chamkaur (1702) and the Second Battle of Chamkaur (1704) fought between the Mughals and Guru Gobind Singh.

Situated on the banks of the Sirhind Canal, Chamkaur sahib is at a distance of 15 km from Morinda and 16 km from Rupnagar. Guru Gobind Singh and his two elder sons and 40 followers had come to this place from Kotla Nihang Khan with his Mughal pursuers close on his heels. They came in the garden sanctuary said to be of a local Hindu ruler Raja Roop Chand, where now Gurudwara Katlgarh Sahib stands. There are several other Gurudwaras named Tari Sahib, Damdama Sahib, Garhi Sahib & Ranjitgarh Sahib that mark the visits and halts of Guru Gobind Singh.

=== Heritage loss ===
The main gurdwara structure of Gurdwara Tilak Asthan (Garhi Sahib) was originally built in the early 19th century during the reign of Maharaja Karam Singh of Patiala in the Phulkian style of Sikh architecture, however it has since been rebuilt by Kar Seva renovators in another style. The original structure of the Garhi Sahib as constructed in the 19th century was demolished by the Kar Seva groups under the patronage of the SGPC, whom built a larger, marble complex in its place. This move was decried by Sikh historians as destroying the heritage of Sikhs. A gurdwara (Damdama Sahib) was also constructed over the bagh (garden) that the tenth Guru used to camp in.

== Shrines ==
Five Historical Gurdwaras in Chamkaur Sahib

1. Gurdwara Sri Katalgarh Sahib
2. Gurdwara Sri Garhi Sahib
3. Gurdwara Sri Damdama Sahib
4. Gurdwara Sri Ranjitgarh Sahib
5. Gurdwara Sri Tarri Sahib

== Attractions ==
Theme Park at Shri Chamkaur Sahib commemorating life and sacrifices of Guru Gobind Singh's eldest sons Baba Ajit Singh and Baba Jujhar Singh has been recently completed.

The Annual ceremony of Elder Sahibzada's of Sri Guru Gobind Singh ji ie Baba Ajit Singh ji, Baba Jujhar Singh ji, Three Piara Bhai Himat Singh ji, Bhai Mohkam Singh ji, Bhai Sahib Singh ji and 40 brave Sikh Soldiers has been celebrated every year with due respect in 20–22 December (6,7,8 Poh).

== Demographics ==
Religion in Chamkaur Sahib
Religion	Percent
Sikhism	66.86%
Hinduism	27.26%
Islam	4.78%
Christianity	0.88%
Others	0.22%

== Gallery ==
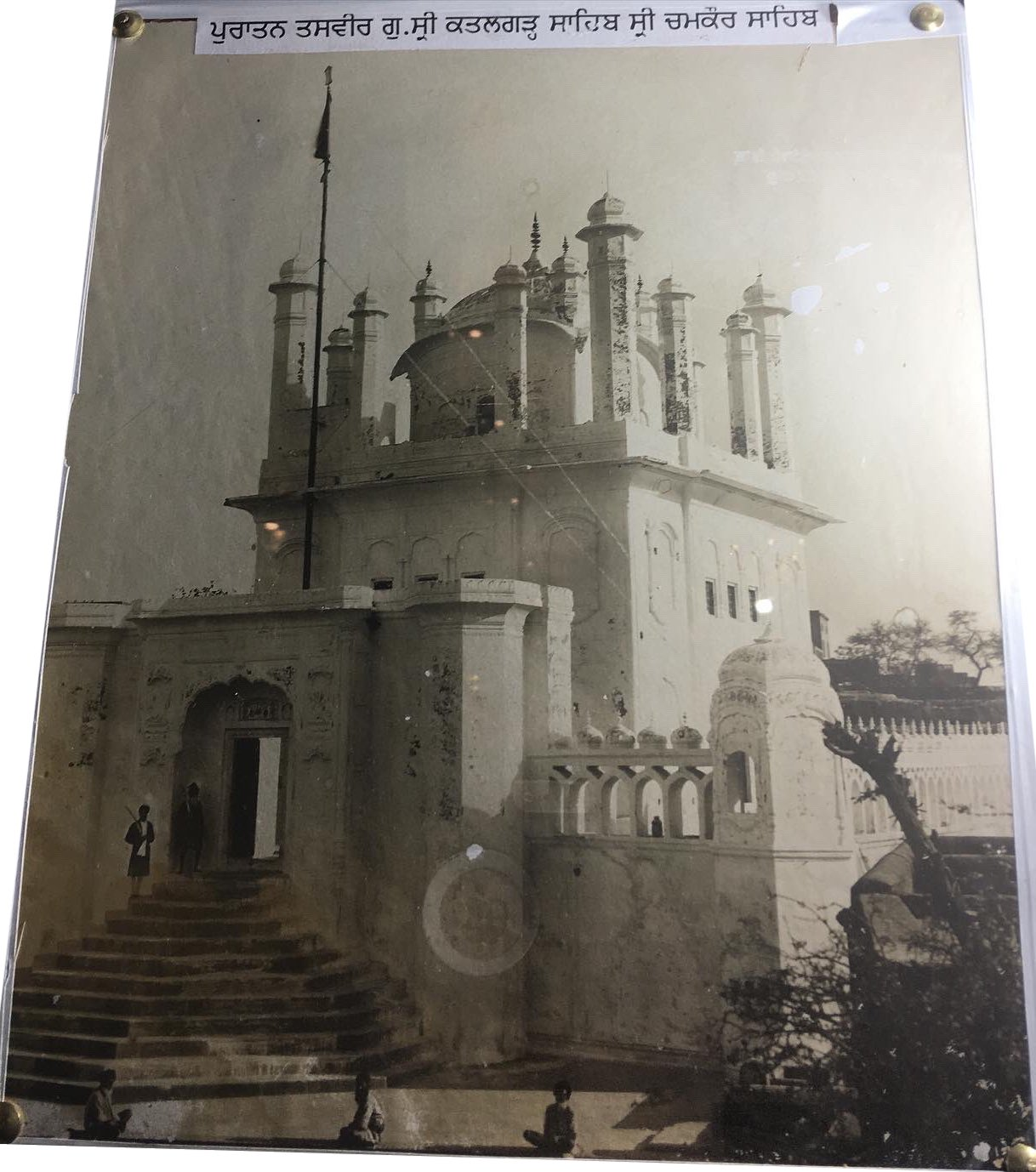
Photograph from the 1920s of Gurdwara Katalgarh Sahib in Chamkaur. This structure was constructed in the 1830s by Raja Bhup Singh of Ropar. Later demolished by Kar Sevaks.

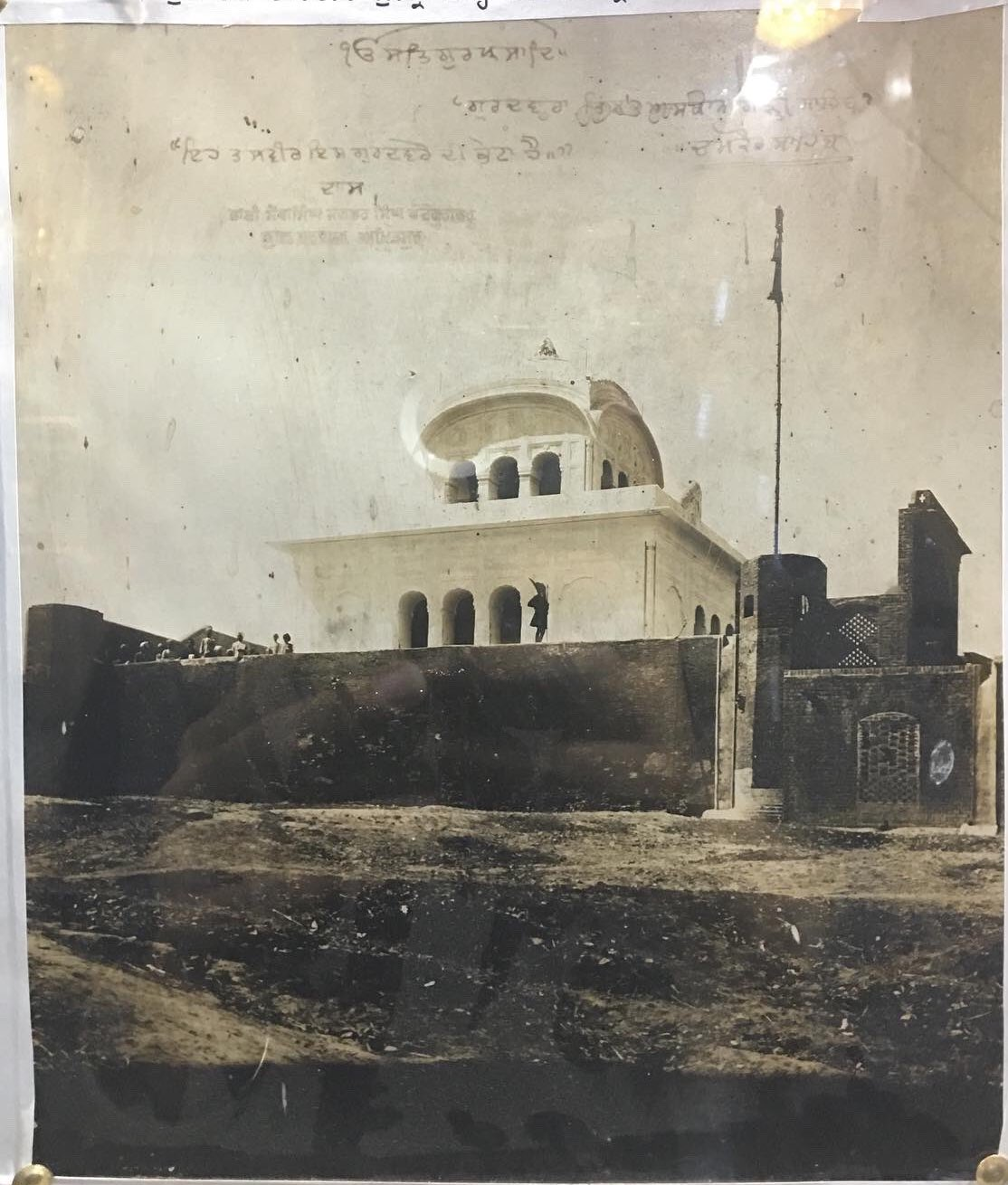
Photograph from the 1920s by Kahn Singh Nabha of Gurdwara Tilak Asthan (Garhi Sahib) in Chamkaur, constructed by Maharaja Karam Singh of Patiala State in the first half of the 19th century (circa 1840s). Later demolished by Kar Sevaks.

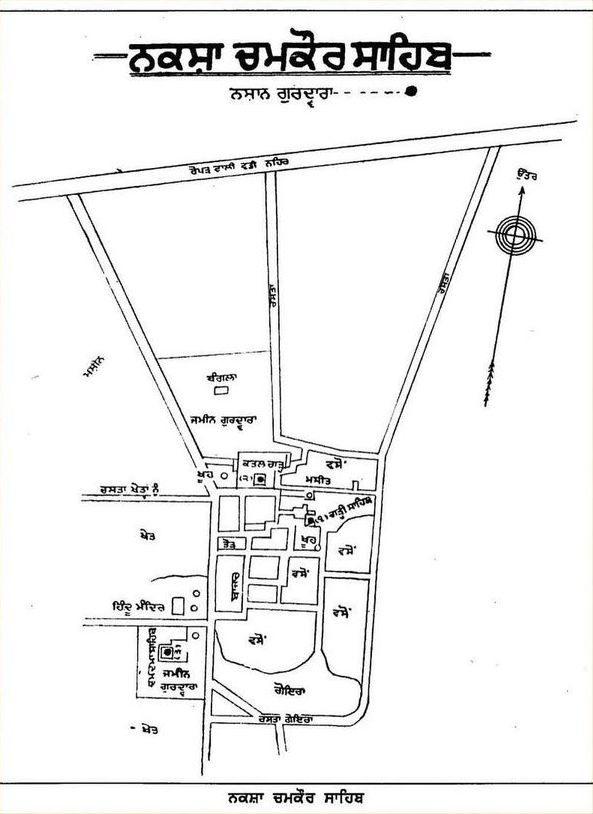
Map of the site of Chamkaur by Kahn Singh Nabha.
