= 1980 Punjab Legislative Assembly election =

Indian regional election

- 6 June 1980

All 117 seats in the Punjab Legislative Assembly 59 seats needed for a majority
- Turnout: 64.33% (▼1.04%)
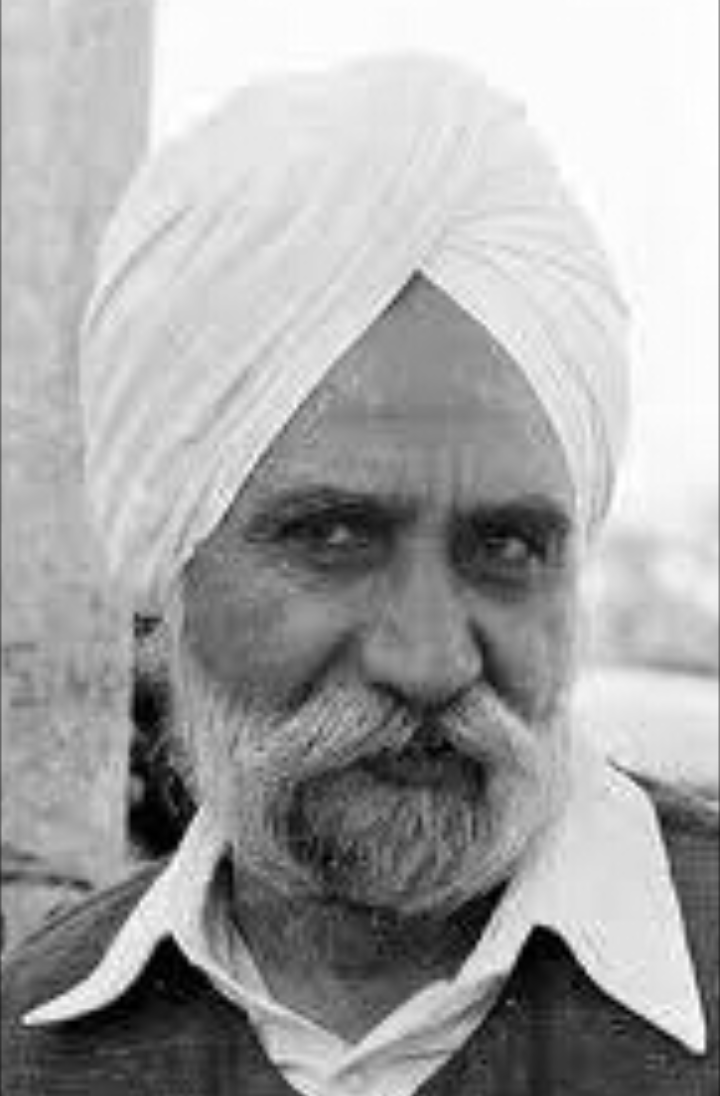

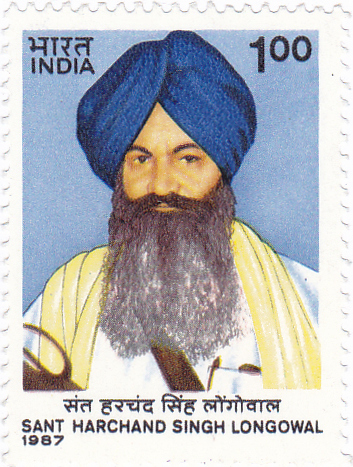

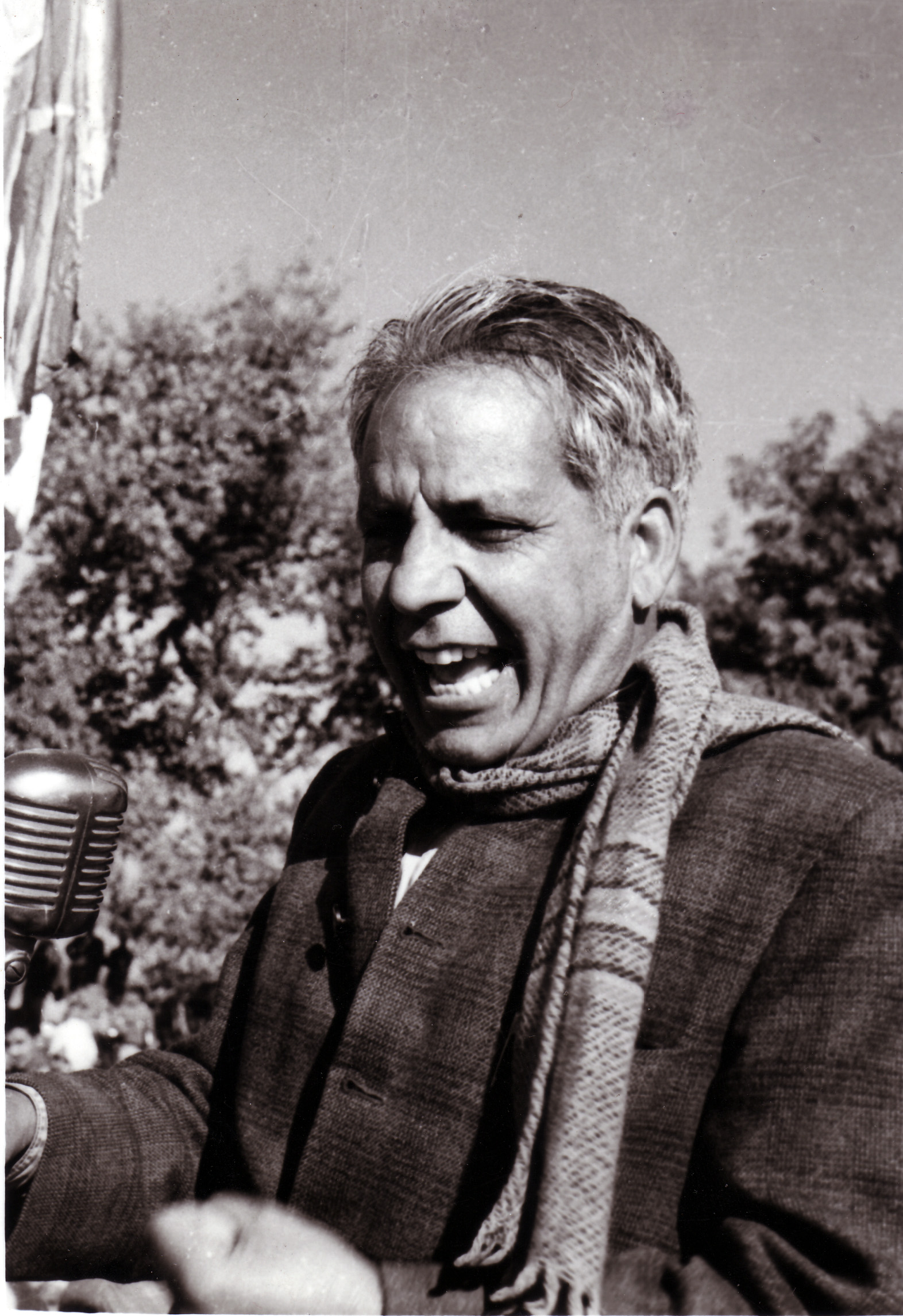
	First party	Second party	Third party
Leader	Darbara Singh	Harchand Singh Longowal	Satyapal Dang
Party	INC	SAD	CPI
Leader's seat	Nakodar (won)	Muktsar (won)	Amritsar West (lost)
Seats won	63	37	9
Seat change	▲46	▼21	▲2
Popular vote	2,825,827	1,683,266	403,718
Percentage	45.19%	26.92%	6.46%
Swing	▲11.6%	▼4.5%	▼0.2%
CM before election
President's rule
Elected CM
Darbara Singh
INC

In the 1980 elections to the Punjab Legislative Assembly, the Congress party achieved an overall majority.

== Result ==
Party	Contested	Seats won	Seats +/-	popular vote	%
Indian National Congress	117	63	▲46	28,25,827	45.19%
Shiromani Akali Dal	73	37	▼21	16,83,266	26.92%
Communist Party of India	18	9	▲2	4,03,718	6.46%
Communist Party of India (Marxist)	13	5	▼3	2,53,985	4.06%
Bharatiya Janata Party	41	1	(new)	4,05,106	6.48%
Independents	376	2	Steady	4,07,799	6.52%
Others	84	0	-	2,73,215	4.36%
Total	722	117		62,52,916	

== Results by constituency ==
	AC Name	AC No.	Type	Winning Candidate	Party	Total Electors	Total Votes	Poll%	Margin	Margin %
1	Fatehgarh	1	GEN	Santokh Singh	Indian National Congress (I)	75,796	55,815	73.6 %	1,960	3.5%
2	Batala	2	GEN	Gopal Krishan Chatrath	Indian National Congress (I)	80,752	53,888	66.7 %	5,616	10.4%
3	Qadian	3	GEN	Mohinder Singh	Shiromani Akali Dal	90,402	62,212	68.8 %	1,612	2.6%
4	Srihargobindpur	4	GEN	Natha Singh	Shiromani Akali Dal	73,449	51,062	69.5 %	4,844	9.5%
5	Kahnuwan	5	GEN	Ujagar Singh	Shiromani Akali Dal	76,354	52,272	68.5 %	388	0.7%
6	Dhariwal	6	GEN	Raj Kumar	Communist Party Of India	80,151	50,147	62.6 %	9,106	18.2%
7	Gurdaspur	7	GEN	Rattan Lal	Indian National Congress (I)	82,283	50,227	61.0 %	2,517	5.0%
8	Dina Nagar	8	SC	Jai Muni	Indian National Congress (I)	81,266	46,781	57.6 %	12,724	27.2%
9	Narot Mehra	9	SC	Amar Nath	Indian National Congress (I)	67,834	42,403	62.5 %	10,512	24.8%
10	Pathankot	10	GEN	Ram Sarup	Indian National Congress (I)	75,242	46,359	61.6 %	1,767	3.8%
11	Sujanpur	11	GEN	Chaman Lal	Indian National Congress (I)	63,955	41,669	65.2 %	9,468	22.7%
12	Beas	12	GEN	Jiwan Singh Umranangal	Shiromani Akali Dal	92,591	63,441	68.5 %	1,692	2.7%
13	Majitha	13	GEN	Parkash Singh	Shiromani Akali Dal	84,004	58,147	69.2 %	5,194	8.9%
14	Verka	14	SC	Sohan Singh	Communist Party Of India	90,115	51,691	57.4 %	346	0.7%
15	Jandiala	15	SC	Tara Singh	Shiromani Akali Dal	87,032	49,077	56.4 %	137	0.3%
16	Amritsar North	16	GEN	Brij Bhushan Mehra	Indian National Congress (I)	94,509	49,371	52.2 %	9,120	18.5%
17	Amritsar West	17	GEN	Sewa Ram	Indian National Congress (I)	1,05,350	58,723	55.7 %	3,642	6.2%
18	Amritsar Central	18	GEN	Darbari Lal	Indian National Congress (I)	75,705	52,351	69.2 %	8,140	15.5%
19	Amritsar South	19	GEN	Pirthipal Singh	Indian National Congress (I)	90,945	54,956	60.4 %	1,761	3.2%
20	Ajnala	20	GEN	Harcharan Singh	Indian National Congress (I)	84,335	59,926	71.1 %	3,441	5.7%
21	Raja Sansi	21	GEN	Iqbal Singh	Indian National Congress (I)	77,006	51,603	67.0 %	1,228	2.4%
22	Attari	22	SC	Darshan Singh Chabal	Communist Party Of India (MARXIST)	71,189	39,554	55.6 %	8,563	21.6%
23	Tarn Taran	23	GEN	Prem Singh Lalpura	Shiromani Akali Dal	85,200	57,418	67.4 %	5,816	10.1%
24	Khadoor Sahib	24	SC	Lakha Singh	Indian National Congress (I)	81,129	38,545	47.5 %	2,015	5.2%
25	Naushahra Panwan	25	GEN	Surinder Singh Kairon	Indian National Congress (I)	77,884	55,304	71.0 %	241	0.4%
26	Patti	26	GEN	Naranjan Singh	Shiromani Akali Dal	90,180	54,647	60.6 %	9,227	16.9%
27	Valtoha	27	GEN	Major Singh Uboke	Shiromani Akali Dal	82,648	54,565	66.0 %	3,618	6.6%
28	Adampur	28	GEN	Kulwant Singh	Communist Party Of India	89,689	59,636	66.5 %	5,400	9.1%
29	Jullundur Cantonment	29	GEN	Ram Lal Chetti	Indian National Congress (I)	81,148	41,855	51.6 %	13,145	31.4%
30	Jullundur North	30	GEN	Gurdial Saini	Indian National Congress (I)	88,772	56,158	63.3 %	3,531	6.3%
31	Jullundur Central	31	GEN	Yash	Indian National Congress (I)	85,498	48,060	56.2 %	418	0.9%
32	Jullundur South	32	SC	Darshan Singh Kaypee	Indian National Congress (I)	74,249	44,300	59.7 %	15,122	34.1%
33	Kartarpur	33	SC	Jagjit Singh	Indian National Congress (I)	83,646	53,583	64.1 %	6,381	11.9%
34	Lohian	34	GEN	Balwant Singh	Shiromani Akali Dal	95,678	70,372	73.6 %	12,606	17.9%
35	Nakodar	35	GEN	Darbara Singh	Indian National Congress (I)	88,920	60,305	67.8 %	723	1.2%
36	Nur Mahal	36	GEN	Sarwan Singh	Communist Party Of India (MARXIST)	86,702	61,844	71.3 %	4,213	6.8%
37	Banga	37	SC	Jagat Ram	Indian National Congress (I)	83,822	55,639	66.4 %	5,303	9.5%
38	Nawan Shahr	38	GEN	Dilbagh Singh	Independent	1,11,724	76,193	68.2 %	15,614	20.5%
39	Phillaur	39	SC	Sarwan Singh	Shiromani Akali Dal	89,876	51,876	57.7 %	2,121	4.1%
40	Bholath	40	GEN	Sukhjinder Singh	Shiromani Akali Dal	74,306	52,897	71.2 %	4,784	9.0%
41	Kapurthala	41	GEN	Raghbir Singh	Shiromani Akali Dal	66,208	42,317	63.9 %	2,921	6.9%
42	Sultanpur	42	GEN	Atma Singh	Shiromani Akali Dal	68,577	50,393	73.5 %	6,642	13.2%
43	Phagwara	43	SC	Piara Ram Dhanowalia	Indian National Congress (I)	88,174	58,176	66.0 %	1,589	2.7%
44	Balachaur	44	GEN	Dalip Chand	Indian National Congress (I)	86,789	50,663	58.4 %	9,933	19.6%
45	Garhshankar	45	GEN	Sarwan Ram	Indian National Congress (I)	82,638	47,827	57.9 %	3,209	6.7%
46	Mahilpur	46	SC	Kartar Singh S/o Ranjha Singh	Shiromani Akali Dal	74,736	40,774	54.6 %	5,976	14.7%
47	Hoshiarpur	47	GEN	Master Kundan Singh	Indian National Congress (I)	85,328	50,833	59.6 %	6,295	12.4%
48	Sham Chaurasi	48	SC	Hari Mittar Hans	Indian National Congress (I)	82,923	48,994	59.1 %	1,703	3.5%
49	Tanda	49	GEN	Surjit Kaur	Indian National Congress (I)	85,497	52,913	61.9 %	1,080	2.0%
50	Garhdiwala	50	SC	Joginder Nath	Indian National Congress (I)	85,605	44,648	52.2 %	126	0.3%
51	Dasuya	51	GEN	Gurbachan Singh	Indian National Congress (I)	83,493	47,535	56.9 %	10,305	21.7%
52	Mukerian	52	GEN	Kewal Krishan	Indian National Congress (I)	85,843	53,694	62.5 %	18,441	34.3%
53	Jagraon	53	GEN	Jagrup Singh	Indian National Congress (I)	97,482	61,983	63.6 %	6,109	9.9%
54	Raikot	54	GEN	Jagdev Singh	Indian National Congress (I)	90,237	57,743	64.0 %	2,595	4.5%
55	Dakha	55	SC	Basant Singh	Shiromani Akali Dal	1,03,688	61,147	59.0 %	4,447	7.3%
56	Qila Raipur	56	GEN	Arjan Singh	Shiromani Akali Dal	92,829	53,349	57.5 %	868	1.6%
57	Ludhiana North	57	GEN	Sardari Lal Kapur	Indian National Congress (I)	89,490	55,718	62.3 %	8,060	14.5%
58	Ludhiana West	58	GEN	Joginder Pall Pandey	Indian National Congress (I)	85,702	48,722	56.9 %	13,322	27.3%
59	Ludhiana East	59	GEN	Om Parkash Gupta	Indian National Congress (I)	79,629	51,338	64.5 %	11,552	22.5%
60	Ludhiana Rural	60	GEN	Bir Paul Singh	Indian National Congress (I)	1,07,620	58,927	54.8 %	12,735	21.6%
61	Payal	61	GEN	Beant Singh	Indian National Congress (I)	88,956	64,030	72.0 %	2,936	4.6%
62	Kum Kalan	62	SC	Daya Singh	Communist Party Of India (MARXIST)	84,645	46,648	55.1 %	1,134	2.4%
63	Samrala	63	GEN	Karam Singh	Indian National Congress (I)	79,501	53,046	66.7 %	7,493	14.1%
64	Khanna	64	SC	Shamsher Singh	Indian National Congress (I)	81,049	56,632	69.9 %	3,431	6.1%
65	Nangal	65	GEN	Sarla Parasher	Indian National Congress (I)	76,800	48,920	63.7 %	2,492	5.1%
66	Anandpur Sahib - Ropar	66	GEN	Basant Singh	Indian National Congress (I)	77,765	48,729	62.7 %	3,585	7.4%
67	Chamkaur Sahib	67	SC	Satwant Kaur	Shiromani Akali Dal	75,868	44,831	59.1 %	5,075	11.3%
68	Morinda	68	GEN	Ravi Inder Singh	Shiromani Akali Dal	85,377	57,415	67.2 %	4,258	7.4%
69	Kharar	69	GEN	Jagat Singh	Indian National Congress (I)	87,201	50,158	57.5 %	5,262	10.5%
70	Banur	70	GEN	Vinod Kumar	Indian National Congress (I)	83,257	54,408	65.3 %	8,896	16.4%
71	Rajpura	71	GEN	Balwant Singh	Communist Party Of India (MARXIST)	83,786	54,629	65.2 %	8,415	15.4%
72	Ghanaur	72	GEN	Jasdev Kaur	Shiromani Akali Dal	74,701	51,226	68.6 %	695	1.4%
73	Dakala	73	GEN	Lal Singh	Indian National Congress (I)	87,455	59,426	68.0 %	2,105	3.5%
74	Shutrana	74	SC	Baldev Singh	Communist Party Of India	83,699	49,101	58.7 %	7,162	14.6%
75	Samana	75	GEN	Sant Ram	Indian National Congress (I)	97,382	59,868	61.5 %	6,685	11.2%
76	Patiala Town	76	GEN	Bram Mohindra	Indian National Congress (I)	83,521	49,853	59.7 %	7,925	15.9%
77	Nabha	77	GEN	Gurdarshan Singh	Indian National Congress (I)	91,259	72,949	79.9 %	1,534	2.1%
78	Amloh	78	SC	Dilip Singh Pandhi	Shiromani Akali Dal	94,855	62,937	66.4 %	1,476	2.3%
79	Sirhind	79	GEN	Birdevinder Singh	Indian National Congress (I)	95,496	67,829	71.0 %	11,926	17.6%
80	Dhuri	80	GEN	Sant Singh	Shiromani Akali Dal	86,464	58,398	67.5 %	3,733	6.4%
81	Malerkotla	81	GEN	Sajida Begum	Indian National Congress (I)	95,034	67,519	71.0 %	13,885	20.6%
82	Sherpur	82	SC	Chand Singh	Communist Party Of India (MARXIST)	79,408	52,488	66.1 %	12,046	23.0%
83	Barnala	83	GEN	Surjit Singh	Shiromani Akali Dal	79,757	60,040	75.3 %	3,310	5.5%
84	Bhadaur	84	SC	Kundan Singh	Shiromani Akali Dal	81,189	51,632	63.6 %	7,604	14.7%
85	Dhanaula	85	GEN	Rajinder Kaur	Indian National Congress (I)	76,104	56,514	74.3 %	2,149	3.8%
86	Sangrur	86	GEN	Sukhdev Singh	Shiromani Akali Dal	79,222	58,350	73.7 %	4,776	8.2%
87	Dirbha	87	GEN	Baldev Singh	Shiromani Akali Dal	79,620	58,800	73.9 %	6,063	10.3%
88	Sunam	88	GEN	Gurbachan Singh	Shiromani Akali Dal	82,589	51,876	62.8 %	13,217	25.5%
89	Lehra	89	GEN	Amar Singh	Communist Party Of India	79,012	46,250	58.5 %	8,137	17.6%
90	Balluana	90	SC	Ujagar Singh S/o Nadar Singh	Indian National Congress (I)	83,137	44,545	53.6 %	1,711	3.8%
91	Abohar	91	GEN	Sajjan Kumar	Indian National Congress (I)	90,309	57,821	64.0 %	9,033	15.6%
92	Fazilka	92	GEN	Kanshi Ram	Indian National Congress (I)	79,661	51,159	64.2 %	10,389	20.3%
93	Jalalabad	93	GEN	Manga Singh	Indian National Congress (I)	90,812	55,633	61.3 %	9,740	17.5%
94	Guru Har Sahai	94	GEN	Khushal Chand	Bharatiya Janta Party	88,153	63,083	71.6 %	1,441	2.3%
95	Firozepur	95	GEN	Bal Mukand	Indian National Congress (I)	86,366	54,222	62.8 %	7,069	13.0%
96	Firozepur Cantonment	96	GEN	Gurnaib Singh Brar	Indian National Congress (I)	80,707	58,422	72.4 %	1,610	2.8%
97	Zira	97	GEN	Harcharan Singh Hero	Shiromani Akali Dal	84,267	60,549	71.9 %	2,938	4.9%
98	Dharamkot	98	SC	Sarwan Singh	Communist Party Of India	82,938	42,447	51.2 %	14,313	33.7%
99	Moga	99	GEN	Nachattar Singh	Indian National Congress (I)	86,547	52,735	60.9 %	5,774	10.9%
100	Bagha Purana	100	GEN	Tej Singh	Shiromani Akali Dal	86,334	56,456	65.4 %	123	0.2%
101	Nihal Singh Wala	101	SC	Saghar Singh	Communist Party Of India	81,034	53,822	66.4 %	4,036	7.5%
102	Panjgrain	102	SC	Gurdev Singh Badal	Shiromani Akali Dal	84,372	44,610	52.9 %	17,077	38.3%
103	Kot Kapura	103	GEN	Bhagwan Dass	Indian National Congress (I)	90,453	59,985	66.3 %	11,611	19.4%
104	Faridkot	104	GEN	Jasmat Singh Dhillon	Independent	88,537	65,002	73.4 %	6,298	9.7%
105	Muktsar	105	GEN	Harchand Singh	Shiromani Akali Dal	89,981	61,541	68.4 %	403	0.7%
106	Giddar Baha	106	GEN	Parksah Singh	Shiromani Akali Dal	88,699	67,388	76.0 %	10,683	15.9%
107	Malout	107	SC	Matu Ram	Indian National Congress (I)	85,292	47,671	55.9 %	157	0.3%
108	Lambi	108	GEN	Hardipinder Singh	Shiromani Akali Dal	88,502	56,747	64.1 %	10,681	18.8%
109	Talwandi Sabo	109	GEN	Avtar Singh	Indian National Congress (I)	71,195	56,537	79.4 %	11,100	19.6%
110	Pakka Kalan	110	SC	Bhagat Singh	Shiromani Akali Dal	78,509	49,008	62.4 %	3,583	7.3%
111	Bhatinda	111	GEN	Surinder Singh	Indian National Congress (I)	97,493	61,439	63.0 %	970	1.6%
112	Nathana	112	SC	Gulzar Singh	Indian National Congress (I)	78,100	51,237	65.6 %	3,677	7.2%
113	Rampura Phul	113	GEN	Babu Singh	Communist Party Of India	79,165	56,158	70.9 %	3,666	6.5%
114	Joga	114	GEN	Baldev Singh Khiala	Shiromani Akali Dal	76,598	56,879	74.3 %	7,682	13.5%
115	Mansa	115	GEN	Buta Singh	Communist Party Of India	80,717	54,318	67.3 %	8,632	15.9%
116	Budhlada	116	GEN	Parshotam Singh	Shiromani Akali Dal	78,779	56,135	71.3 %	2,025	3.6%
117	Sardulgarh	117	GEN	Balwinder Singh	Shiromani Akali Dal	75,775	58,932	77.8 %	9,867	16.7%

== Bye Elections ==
#	AC Name	No	Winning Candidate	Party
1	Faridkot	104	J.Kaur(W)	SAD
2	Nangal	65	R.P.Kalsera	INC

== See also ==
Eighth Punjab Legislative Assembly

Elections in Punjab
