= Baldev =

Baldev is a given name. Notable persons with that name include:

- Baldev Singh Aulakh (born 1964), Indian politician from Uttar Pradesh
- Baldev Raj Chawla, Indian politician from Punjab
- Baldev Raj Chopra (1914–2008), Indian Hindi director
- Baldev Singh Dhillon (born 1947), Indian agricultural scientist
- Baldev Dua (1936–2002), Indian cricketer
- Baldev Raj Gupta (born 1942), Indian linguistic scientist, and a Punjabi and Hindi writer
- Baldev Khosa, India actor and politician from Maharashtra
- Baldev Mishra (1890–1975), Indian Maithili writer
- Baldev Olakh, Indian politician from Uttar Pradesh
- Baldev Raj Nayar (born 1931), Indian political scientist
- Baldev Raj (born 1947), Indian nuclear scientist
- Baldev Singh (disambiguation), several persons
- Baldev Singh Mann (1952–1990), Indian politician from Punjab
- Baldev Singh Tomar (born 1970), Indian politician from Himachal Pradesh
- Baldev Upadhyaya (1899–1999), Indian Hindi Sanskrit literary scholar

== See also ==
- Baladeva (disambiguation)
