= Johar Singh =

Indian politician

Member of Punjab Legislative Assembly
- In office 1985–1987
- Preceded by: Ujagar Singh
- Succeeded by: Partap Singh Bajwa
- Constituency: Kahnuwan

Personal details
- Born: Punjab, India
- Party: Akali Dal (Waris Punjab De)
- Other political affiliations: Shiromani Akali Dal (Sanyukt); Shiromani Akali Dal (Amritsar); Shiromani Akali Dal

Master Johar Singh is an Indian politician of Akali Dal Waris Punjab De, and former Member of the Legislative Assembly for Kahnuwan.

== Political career ==
Singh began his political journey by getting elected as MLA from Kahnuwan in 1985 as a candidate of Shiromani Akali Dal. He contested from this constituency again in 2002 as a member of the Shiromani Akali Dal (Amritsar), but came in fourth place, being defeated by Partap Singh Bajwa Shiromani Akali Dal (Sanyukt) declared Singh as its candidate for Qadian in 2022, but he was unsuccessful, coming in fifth place. Singh officially joined Akali Dal (Waris Punjab De) on 13 August 2026, along with Iqbal Singh Jhundan and around a dozen other politicians.

Singh has remained a prominent figure with Sikh management affairs, often being involved with the Shiromani Gurdwara Parbandhak Committee, and being the former president of Chhota Ghallughara Gurdwara Management Trust. He was given punishment by Akal Takht in 2018 for misconduct that occurred under his leadership.

== Electoral performance ==
Punjab Legislative Assembly Election, 1985: Kahnuwan
Party	Candidate	Votes	%	±%
SAD	Master Johar Singh			
INC	Surinderjit Singh			
CPI(M)	Ajit Singh			
Independent	Jatinder Singh			New entry
Majority				
Turnout				
Registered electors				
SAD hold		Swing		

Punjab Legislative Assembly Election, 2002: Kahnuwan
Party	Candidate	Votes	%	±%
INC	Partap Singh Bajwa			▲
SAD	Sewa Singh Sekhwan			▼
Independent	Ajit Singh Thakar Sandhu			New entry
SAD(M)	Master Johar Singh			
Majority				
Turnout				
Registered electors		144,962		
INC gain from SAD		Swing		

Punjab Assembly election, 2022: Qadian
Party	Candidate	Votes	%	±%
INC	Partap Singh Bajwa	48,679	36.55	▼11.28
SAD	Guriqbal Singh Mahal	41,505	31.16	▼7.70
AAP	Jagroop Singh Sekhwan	34,916	26.22	▲15.20
SAD(A)	Jatinderbir Singh Pannu	4,306	3.25	
SAD(S)	Master Johar Singh	747	0.56	
NOTA	None of the above	777	0.58	▼0.15
Majority		7,174	5.39	
Turnout		133,183		
Registered electors		181,907		
INC hold		Swing		
