= Baldev Singh (disambiguation) =

Baldev Singh (1902–1961) was an Indian Sikh politician and the first Minister of Defence of India.

Baldev Singh may also refer to:

- Baldev Singh (athlete), Indian Olympic athlete
- Baldev Singh (author) (born 1942), India Punjabi writer
- Baldev Singh (basketball) (born 1951), Indian Olympic basketball player
- Baldev Singh (field hockey) (born 1951), Indian Olympic hockey player
- Baldev Singh (Haryana politician) (1889–1976), Indian politician from Haryana
- Baldev Singh (neurologist) (1904–1998), Indian neurologist
- Baldev Singh Aulakh (born 1964), Indian politician from Uttar Pradesh
- Baldev Singh Ballamgarh, Indian politician from Punjab
- Baldev Singh Dhillon (born 1947), Indian agricultural scientist
- Baldev Singh Khaira Punjab MLA (2017-22)
- Baldev Singh Mann (1952–1986), Indian politician from Punjab
- Baldev Singh Tomar (born 1970), Indian politician from Himachal Pradesh
- Baldev Singh (Sholay), a fictional character in the classic 1975 Indian film Sholay
