= Kahnuwan Assembly constituency =

Former constituency of the Punjab Legislative Assembly

Coordinates: 31.91°N 75.45°E

Kahnuwan
- Former constituency No. 5 for the Punjab Legislative Assembly

Constituency details
- Country: India
- State: Punjab
- District: Gurdaspur
- Lok Sabha constituency: Gurdaspur
- Established: 1977
- Abolished: 2012
- Total electors: 122,597 (2002)
- Reservation: None

Kahnuwan was a Punjab Legislative Assembly constituency till 2012.

== Members of the Legislative Assembly ==
Year	Member	Party
1977	Ujagar Singh	Shiromani Akali Dal
1980	Ujagar Singh	Shiromani Akali Dal
1985	Master Johar Singh	Shiromani Akali Dal
1992	Partap Singh Bajwa	Indian National Congress
1997	Sewa Singh Sekhwan	Shiromani Akali Dal
2002	Partap Singh Bajwa	Indian National Congress
2007	Partap Singh Bajwa	Indian National Congress
Constituency disbanded

== Election results ==
=== 2007 ===
Punjab Assembly election, 2007: Kahnuwan
Party	Candidate	Votes	%	±%
INC	Partap Singh Bajwa			
SAD	Sewa Singh Sekhwan			
Independent	Narinder Kaur			New entry
BSP	Lakhwinder Singh			
Majority				
Turnout				
Registered electors				
INC hold		Swing		

=== 2002 ===
Punjab Legislative Assembly Election, 2002: Kahnuwan
Party	Candidate	Votes	%	±%
INC	Partap Singh Bajwa			▲
SAD	Sewa Singh Sekhwan			▼
Independent	Ajit Singh Thakar Sandhu			New entry
SAD(M)	Master Johar Singh			
Majority				
Turnout				
Registered electors		144,962		
INC gain from SAD		Swing		

=== 1985 ===
Punjab Legislative Assembly Election, 1985: Kahnuwan
Party	Candidate	Votes	%	±%
SAD	Master Johar Singh			
INC	Surinderjit Singh			
CPI(M)	Ajit Singh			
Independent	Jatinder Singh			New entry
Majority				
Turnout				
Registered electors				
SAD hold		Swing		
