= Punjab Assembly Committee on Co-operation and its allied activities =

Indian Legislative committee

Committee on Co-operation and its allied activities
Committee of the House
- 16th Punjab Assembly
- State: Punjab

Leadership
- Chaiperson: Saravjit Kaur Manuke
- Chairperson party: Aam Aadmi Party
- Appointer: Punjab Assembly speaker

Structure
- Seats: 13
- Political Parties: AAP (11); INC (2); BJP (1)
- Election criteria: The members are elected every year from amongst its members of house according to the principle of proportional representation.
- Tenure: 1 Year

Jurisdiction
- Purpose: Legislative oversight of the questions, replies and debates in the Assembly

Rules & Procedure
- Applicable rules: Article 208 of the Constitution of India section 32 of the States Reorganisation Act, 1956; Rules 232(1) and 2(b) of Rules of Procedure and Conduct of Business in Punjab Legislative Assembly

Punjab Assembly Committee on Co-operation and its allied activities of Punjab Legislative Assembly is constituted annually for a one year period from among the members of the Assembly. This Committee consists of thirteen members.

== Appointment ==
The speaker appoints the committee and its members every year for a one year term according to the powers conferred by Article 208 of the Constitution of India read with section 32 of the States Reorganisation Act, 1956 (37 of 1956), and in pursuance of Rules 232(1) and 2(b) of the Rules of Procedure and Conduct of Business in the Punjab Legislative Assembly.

== Members ==
For the one year period starting May 2022, the Committee on Co-operation and its allied activities of 16th Punjab Assembly had following members:

Committee on Co-operation and its allied activities (2022–23)
Sr. No.	Name	Post	Party
1	Saravjit Kaur Manuke	Chairperson	AAP
2	Amandeep Singh Musafir	Member	AAP
3	Amarpal Singh	Member	AAP
4	Ashwani Kumar Sharma	Member	BJP
5	Daljit Singh Grewal (Bhola)	Member	AAP
6	Devinderjeet Singh Laddi Dhose	Member	AAP
7	Dinesh Kumar Chadha	Member	AAP
8	Inderjit Kaur Mann	Member	AAP
9	Jagtar Singh Diyalpura	Member	AAP
10	Jaswant Singh Gajjan Majra	Member	AAP
11	Naresh Puri	Member	INC
12	Rupinder Singh	Member	AAP
13	Sandeep Jakhar	Member	INC

== Chairpersons ==
Tenure	Terms	Name	Political party
2021-22	1	Fatehjang Singh Bajwa	Indian National Congress
2022-23	1	Saravjit Kaur Manuke	Aam Aadmi Party

== Previous members ==
=== 2021–22 ===
Committee on Co-operation and its allied activities (2021–22)
Sr. No.	Name	Post	Party
1.	Fatehjang Singh Bajwa	Chairperson	INC
2.	Santokh Singh Bhalaipur	Member	INC
3.	Harminder Singh Gill	Member	INC
4.	Satkar Kaur	Member	INC
5.	Dalvir Singh Goldy	Member	INC
6.	Dharambir Agnihotri	Member	INC
7.	Indu Bala	Member	INC
8.	Hardev Singh Laddi	Member	INC
9.	Sukhpal Singh Bhullar	Member	INC
10.	Jagtar Singh Jagga Hissowal	Member	AAP
11.	Aman Arora	Member	AAP
12.	Parminder Singh Dhindsa	Member	SAD
13.	Manpreet Singh Ayali	Member	SAD
