= Shakuntala Jakhu =

Indian civil servant

Shakuntala Jakhu was a 1978 batch IAS officer and the former Chief Secretary to the Government of Haryana. She was the fourth female chief secretary of Haryana.

== Career ==
Before her appointment as Chief Secretary, Jakhu served in several key administrative roles. She was the Additional Chief Secretary and Financial Commissioner for the Revenue, Disaster Management, and Consolidation Departments. Her tenure as Chief Secretary began on August 1, 2014, following the retirement of S.C. Choudhary. Initially scheduled to retire on September 30, 2014, her service was extended until November 30, 2014, with clearance from the Election Commission.

== Personal life ==
She was born in Ravidassia Community and married to a 1979 batch IAS officer, Ramendra Jakhu. She is also a close relative of former Union Minister and Lok Sabha MP Kumari Selja.

== Controversy ==
Jakhu was among three Haryana cadre bureaucrats whose names were in the scam of Associate Journals Limited (AJL), publisher of the National Herald newspaper, despite getting a clean chit from the State Vigilance Bureau (SVB) in 2016.

== See also ==
- Malkiat Singh Jakhu
- Jagmohan Singh Raju
