= Partap Singh Bajwa =

Indian politician

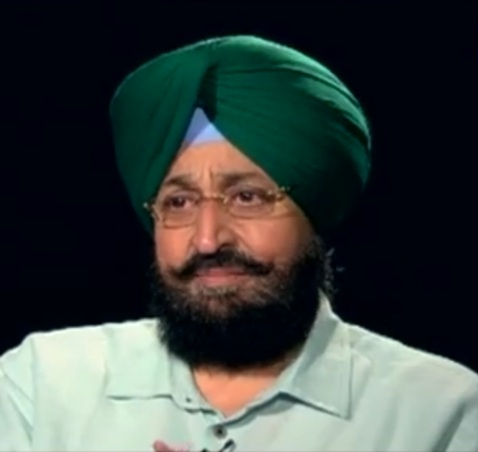

18th Leader of the Opposition, Punjab Legislative Assembly
- Incumbent
- Assumed office 9 April 2022
- Deputy: Raj Kumar Chabbewal (till 2024); Aruna Chaudhary (incumbent)
- Preceded by: Harpal Singh Cheema

Member of the Punjab Legislative Assembly
- Incumbent
- Assumed office 10 March 2022
- Preceded by: Fatehjang Singh Bajwa
- Constituency: Qadian
- In office 2002–2009
- Preceded by: Sewa Singh Sekhwan
- Constituency: Kahnuwan
- In office 1992–1997
- Preceded by: Johar Singh
- Succeeded by: Sewa Singh Sekhwan
- Constituency: Kahnuwan

Member of Parliament, Rajya Sabha
- In office 9 April 2016 – 9 April 2022
- Preceded by: Ashwani Kumar
- Succeeded by: Sandeep Pathak
- Constituency: Punjab, India

Member of Parliament, Lok Sabha
- In office 2009–2014
- Preceded by: Vinod Khanna
- Succeeded by: Vinod Khanna
- Constituency: Gurdaspur

President of Punjab Pradesh Congress Committee
- In office 2013 - 2015
- Preceded by: Captain Amarinder Singh
- Succeeded by: Captain Amarinder Singh

Personal details
- Born: 29 January 1957 (age 69) Qadian, Punjab, India
- Party: Indian National Congress
- Spouse: Charanjit Kaur Bajwa

Partap Singh Bajwa is an Indian politician who served as a member of the Lok Sabha representing Gurdaspur in Punjab from 2009 to 2014. Currently, he is a Member of the Legislative Assembly for Punjab and the 18th leader of the opposition in the Punjab assembly since 2022 March.

== Early life ==
He is the son of Satnam Singh Bajwa who was a three-time Member of Legislative Assembly Punjab and Minister in the government of Punjab. He completed his schooling at Punjab Public School, Nabha. He started his career in politics as a student leader in 1976 became President of Youth Congress in 1982 and rose to the President of State Congress. He has served as a minister under chief ministers Beant Singh, Rajinder Kaur Bhathal, and Amarinder Singh.

== Career ==
He started his career in politics as a student leader in 1976 from DAV College, Chandigarh, became President of District Youth Congress Gurdaspur then Vice President of Youth Congress in 1980, President of Youth Congress in 1982, and rose to the President of State Congress.

=== Member of Legislative Assembly ===
He was elected to Punjab Vidhan Sabha from Kahnuwan Constituency in 1992, 2002, and 2007. He worked in various different departments under the government of Punjab.

He was Minister of State Information and Public Relations government of Punjab from 1994 to 1995, Cabinet Minister P.W.D B&R, I&PR, Government of Punjab from 1995 to 1996, Cabinet Minister Judiciary, Jails, etc. Government of Punjab from 1996 to 1997, Cabinet Minister P.W.D B&R, School Education, Govt of Punjab from 2002 to 2007.

=== Member of Parliament ===
He defeated the actor and four-time sitting MP Vinod Khanna of the Bharatiya Janata Party in general elections and became Member of Parliament in 2009 from Gurdaspur Constituency. He was made the President of the Punjab Pradesh Congress Committee in March 2013.

=== Member of Legislative Assembly fourth term ===
He was elected to Punjab Vidhan Sabha from Qadian Constituency in 2022. He was appointed the Leader of Opposition in the Punjab assembly. The Aam Aadmi Party gained a strong 79% majority in the sixteenth Punjab Legislative Assembly by winning 92 out of 117 seats in the 2022 Punjab Legislative Assembly election. MP Bhagwant Mann was sworn in as Chief Minister on 16 March 2022.

== Assets and liabilities declared during elections ==
During the 2022 Punjab Legislative Assembly election, he declared Rs. 36,91,19,618 as an overall financial asset and Rs. 1,02,56,481 as financial liability.

== Controversy ==
=== 50 bombs have arrived in Punjab, statement ===
More recently, Bajwa claimed that 50 bombs had reached Punjab, 18 of which had exploded, and 32 were yet to explode. This raised alarm and controversy. Following this, an FIR (First Information Report) was filed against him for the statement, accusing him of spreading false information and provoking public panic. He was questioned by the police (for about 6 hours) in Mohali in connection with that FIR.

=== Those who used to repair mobile phones are now MLAs ===
Bajwa, in a public gathering in Jalandhar, took a dig at AAP MLA Labh Singh Ugoke, a Dalit MLA who earlier ran a mobile-repair shop. He said people who used to repair mobile phones are now MLAs. The remark was criticized by AAP leaders as insulting not just to Ugoke but to the Dalit community at large. They said Bajwa’s comment reflected a derogatory attitude toward people from humble, working-class backgrounds.

== Electoral performance ==
Punjab Legislative Assembly Election, 2002: Kahnuwan
Party	Candidate	Votes	%	±%
INC	Partap Singh Bajwa			▲
SAD	Sewa Singh Sekhwan			▼
Independent	Ajit Singh Thakar Sandhu			New entry
SAD(M)	Master Johar Singh			
Majority				
Turnout				
Registered electors		144,962		
INC gain from SAD		Swing		

Punjab Assembly election, 2007: Kahnuwan
Party	Candidate	Votes	%	±%
INC	Partap Singh Bajwa			
SAD	Sewa Singh Sekhwan			
Independent	Narinder Kaur			New entry
BSP	Lakhwinder Singh			
Majority				
Turnout				
Registered electors				
INC hold		Swing		

2009 Indian general elections: Gurdaspur
Party	Candidate	Votes	%	±%
INC	Partap Singh Bajwa	447,994	48.00	
BJP	Vinod Khanna	4,39,652	47.10	
BSP	Swaran Singh Thakur	15,420	1.65	
IND.	Lal Chand	7,037	0.75	
IND.	Vidya Bhushan	6,970	0.75	
Majority		8,342	0.90	
Turnout		9,33,370	70.77	
INC gain from BJP		Swing		

Punjab Assembly election, 2022: Qadian
Party	Candidate	Votes	%	±%
INC	Partap Singh Bajwa	48,679	36.55	▼11.28
SAD	Guriqbal Singh Mahal	41,505	31.16	▼7.70
AAP	Jagroop Singh Sekhwan	34,916	26.22	▲15.20
SAD(A)	Jatinderbir Singh Pannu	4,306	3.25	
SAD(S)	Master Johar Singh	747	0.56	
NOTA	None of the above	777	0.58	▼0.15
Majority		7,174	5.39	
Turnout		133,183		
Registered electors		181,907		
INC hold		Swing		

Political offices
Preceded by Harpal Singh Cheema	Leader of Opposition in 16th Punjab Assembly; 2022 –	Incumbent
Lok Sabha
Preceded by Vinod Khanna	Member of Parliament for Gurdaspur; 2009 – 2014	Succeeded by Vinod Khanna
State Legislative Assembly
Preceded by Fatehjang Singh Bajwa	Member of the Punjab Legislative Assembly from Qadian Assembly constituency 2022 –	Incumbent
