= Qadian Assembly constituency =

Legislative Assembly constituency in Punjab State, India

Coordinates: 31.82°N 75.38°E

Qadian
- Constituency No. 6 for the Punjab Legislative Assembly

Constituency details
- Country: India
- State: Punjab
- District: Gurdaspur
- Lok Sabha constituency: Gurdaspur
- Total electors: 181,907 (in 2022)
- Reservation: None

Member of Legislative Assembly
- 16th Punjab Legislative Assembly
- Incumbent Partap Singh Bajwa
- Party: Indian National Congress
- Elected year: 2022

Qadian Assembly constituency (Sl. No.: 6), is a Punjab Legislative Assembly constituency covering Qadian in Gurdaspur district, Punjab state, India. VVPAT will be used in Qadian in 2017 Assembly polls.

== Members of Legislative Assembly ==
Most successful parties from Qadian Vidhan Sabha
1. SAD (7 Times) (53.8%)
2. INC (6 Times) (46.2%)

Year	Member	Party
1967	S. Singh	Indian National Congress
1969	Satnam Singh Bajwa	Shiromani Akali Dal
1972	Satnam Singh Bajwa	Shiromani Akali Dal
1977	Mohinder Singh	Shiromani Akali Dal
1980	Mohinder Singh	Shiromani Akali Dal
1985	Kalwant Singh	Shiromani Akali Dal
1992	Tript Rajinder Singh Bajwa	Indian National Congress
1997	Natha Singh Dalam	Shiromani Akali Dal
2002	Tript Rajinder Singh Bajwa	Indian National Congress
2007	Lakhbir Singh Lodhinangal	Shiromani Akali Dal
2012	Charanjit Kaur Bajwa	Indian National Congress
2017	Fatehjang Singh Bajwa	Indian National Congress
2022	Partap Singh Bajwa	Indian National Congress

== Election results ==
=== 2027 ===
Punjab Assembly election, 2027: Qadian
Party	Candidate	Votes	%	±%
INC				
AAP	Guriqbal Singh Mahal			
SAD				
AD (WPD)				New entry
BSP				
BJP				New entry
NOTA	None of the above			
Majority				
Turnout				

=== 2022 ===
Punjab Assembly election, 2022: Qadian
Party	Candidate	Votes	%	±%
INC	Partap Singh Bajwa	48,679	36.55	▼11.28
SAD	Guriqbal Singh Mahal	41,505	31.16	▼7.70
AAP	Jagroop Singh Sekhwan	34,916	26.22	▲15.20
SAD(A)	Jatinderbir Singh Pannu	4,306	3.25	
SAD(S)	Master Johar Singh	747	0.56	
NOTA	None of the above	777	0.58	▼0.15
Majority		7,174	5.39	
Turnout		133,183		
Registered electors		181,907		
INC hold		Swing		

=== 2017 ===
Punjab Assembly election, 2017: Qadian
Party	Candidate	Votes	%	±%
INC	Fatehjang Singh Bajwa	62,596	47.83	▼1.11
SAD	Sewa Singh Sekhwan	50,859	38.86	▲3.13
AAP	Kamalpreet Singh Kaki	14,657	11.20	new
NOTA	None of the above	953	0.73	−−
Majority		11,737	8.90	
Turnout		131,829	74.77	▼1.01
Registered electors		176,309		
INC hold		Swing		

=== 2012 ===
Punjab Assembly election, 2012: Qadian
Party	Candidate	Votes	%	±%
INC	Charanjit Kaur Bajwa	59,843	48.94	▲2.14
SAD	Sewa Singh Sekhwan	43,687	35.73	▼12.67
Independent	Sucha Singh Chhotepur	15,428	12.62	−−
Majority		16,156	13.21	
Turnout		122,276	75.78	▼1.74
INC gain from SAD		Swing		

=== 2007 ===
Punjab Assembly election, 2007: Qadian
Party	Candidate	Votes	%	±%
SAD	Lakhbir Singh Lodhinangal	52,567	48.40	▲4.50
INC	Tript Rajinder Singh Bajwa	50,828	46.80	▼4.75
Majority		1,739	1.60	
Turnout		108,590	77.52	▲6.32
SAD gain from INC		Swing		
