= Lalitesh Mishra =

Indian scholar (1953–2023)

- Born: Lalitesh Mishra; 3 March 1950; Bangaon, Bihar, India
- Died: 31 August 2023 (aged 73); Noida, Uttar Pradesh, India
- Occupations: Writer, Journalist, Academician
- Spouse: Rekha Mishra

Lalitesh Mishra was an Indian scholar of English and Maithili literature, academician, and a journalist from Saharsa district of Bihar having majorly worked for The Hindustan Times and the The Telegraph. He was awarded with Kiran Sahitya Samman in 2019 and Sir Ganganath Jha Award in 2023 by Akhil Bhartiya Mithila Sangh for his literary contributions to Maithili Literature. He passed away on August 31, 2023 at the age of 73 years. He wrote and edited several books in Maithili and a solitary work in English named Pied Poesy..
