= Dirba Assembly constituency =

Constituency of the Punjab legislative assembly in India

Coordinates: 30.07°N 75.99°E

Dirba
- Constituency No. 100 for the Punjab Legislative Assembly

Constituency details
- Country: India
- State: Punjab
- District: Sangrur
- Lok Sabha constituency: Sangrur
- Established: 1976
- Total electors: 182,695 (in 2022)
- Reservation: SC

Member of Legislative Assembly
- 16th Punjab Legislative Assembly
- Incumbent Harpal Singh Cheema
- Party: Aam Aadmi Party
- Elected year: 2022

Dirba is a Punjab Legislative Assembly constituency in Sangrur district, Punjab state, India.

== Members of the Legislative Assembly ==
Most successful parties from Dirba Vidhan Sabha
1. SAD (4 Times) (40.0%)
2. INC (3 Times) (30.0%)
3. AAP (2 Times) (20.0%)
4. IND (1 Time) (10.0%)

Year	Member	Party
1977	Baldev Singh	Shiromani Akali Dal
1980	Baldev Singh	Shiromani Akali Dal
1985	Baldev Singh	Shiromani Akali Dal
1992	Gurcharan Singh	Indian National Congress
1997	Gurcharan Singh	Indian National Congress
2002	Surjit Singh Dhiman	Independent
2007	Surjit Singh Dhiman	Indian National Congress
2012	Balvir Singh Ghunas	Shiromani Akali Dal
2017	Harpal Singh Cheema	Aam Aadmi Party
2022	Harpal Singh Cheema	Aam Aadmi Party

== Election results ==
=== 2027 ===
Punjab Assembly election, 2027: Dirba
Party	Candidate	Votes	%	±%
AAP				
AD (WPD)				New entry
INC				
BSP				
SAD				
BJP				New entry
NOTA	None of the above			
Majority				
Turnout				

=== 2022 ===
2022 Punjab Legislative Assembly election: Dirba
Party	Candidate	Votes	%	±%
AAP	Harpal Singh Cheema	82,630	56.89	
SAD	Gulzar Singh Moonak	31,975	22.01	
INC	Ajaib Singh Rataul	10,472	7.21	
SAD(A)	Mandeep Singh	9,000	6.20	
SAD(S)	Soma Singh	4,760	3.30	
NOTA	None of the above	1002	0.69	
Majority		50,655	34.88	
Turnout		145,257		
Registered electors		183,788		
AAP hold				

=== 2017 results ===
2017 Punjab Legislative Assembly election: Dirba
Party	Candidate	Votes	%	±%
AAP	Harpal Singh Cheema	46,434	32.12	
INC	Ajaib Singh Ratolan	44,789	30.99	
SAD	Gulzar Singh	44,777	30.98	
Independent	Darshan Singh Sidhu	2,875	1.99	
BSP	Harwinder Singh	2,081	1.44	
SAD(A)	Mandeep Singh	1,779	1.23	
Communist Party of India (Marxist-Leninist)	Gharmand Singh	789	0.55	
Independent	Bikar Singh	630	0.44	
APP	Jagtar Singh	369	0.26	
Registered electors		174,214		
AAP gain from SAD		Swing		
