= Jagraon Assembly constituency =

Constituency of the Punjab legislative assembly in India

Coordinates: 30.79°N 75.47°E

Jagraon
- Constituency No. 70 for the Punjab Legislative Assembly

Constituency details
- Country: India
- State: Punjab
- District: Ludhiana
- Lok Sabha constituency: Ludhiana
- Total electors: 184,819 (in 2022)
- Reservation: SC

Member of Legislative Assembly
- 16th Punjab Legislative Assembly
- Incumbent Saravjit Kaur Manuke
- Party: Aam Aadmi Party
- Elected year: 2022

Jagraon is a Punjab Legislative Assembly constituency in Ludhiana district, Punjab state, India. This constituency was once represented by Lachhman Singh Gill, a former Chief Minister. The incumbent MLA since 2017 is Saravjit Kaur Manuke of the Aam Aadmi Party.

== Members of the Legislative Assembly ==
Most Successful parties from Jagraon Vidhan Sabha
1. SAD (9 Times) (52.9%)
2. INC(5 Times) (29.4%)
3. AAP (2 Times) (11.8%)
4. INC (I) (1 Time) (5.88%)

Year	Member	Party
1951*	Gopal Singh Khalsa	Shiromani Akali Dal
1952	Iqbal Singh	Shiromani Akali Dal
1957	Harparkash Kaur	Indian National Congress
1962	Lachhman Singh Gill	Shiromani Akali Dal
1967	G. Singh	Indian National Congress
1969	Nahar Singh	Indian National Congress
1972	Tara Singh	Shiromani Akali Dal
1977	Dalip Singh	Shiromani Akali Dal
1980	Jagrup Singh	Indian National Congress (Indira)
1985	Gurdip Singh	Shiromani Akali Dal
1992	Darshan Singh Brar	Indian National Congress
1997	Bhag Singh Mallah	Shiromani Akali Dal
2002	Bhag Singh Mallah	Shiromani Akali Dal
2007	Gurdeep Singh Bhaini	Indian National Congress
2012	Shiv Ram Kaler	Shiromani Akali Dal
2017	Saravjit Kaur Manuke	Aam Aadmi Party
2022	Saravjit Kaur Manuke	Aam Aadmi Party

* Bypoll

== Election results ==
=== 2027 ===
Punjab Assembly election, 2027: Jagraon
Party	Candidate	Votes	%	±%
AAP				
INC				
BSP				
AD (WPD)				New entry
SAD	Shiv ram kaler			
BJP				
NOTA	None of the above			
Majority				
Turnout				

=== 2022 ===
Assembly Election 2022: Jagraon
Party	Candidate	Votes	%	±%
AAP	Saravjit Kaur Manuke	65,195	51.95	▲6.26
SAD	Shiv Ram Kaler	25,539	20.35	▼4.37
INC	Jagtar Singh Jagga Hissowal	20,878	16.64	▼10.05
SAD(A)	Parivar Singh Dalla	5,179	4.13	New entry
BJP	Kanwar Narinder Singh	4,476	3.57	New entry
NOTA	None of the above	1,057	0.84	
Majority		39,656	31.6	
Turnout		125,503		
Registered electors		184,819		
AAP hold				

=== 2017 ===
Assembly Election 2017: 70. Jagraon
Party	Candidate	Votes	%	±%
AAP	Saravjit Kaur Manuke	61,521	45.69	New entry
INC	Malkit Singh Dakha	35,945	26.69	▼16.63
SAD	Amarjit Kaur Sahoke	33,295	24.72	▼18.77
Independent	Avtar Singh Billa	1,564	1.16	New entry
NOTA	None of the above	996	0.74	
BSP	Subedar Sadhu Singh Tappar	591	0.44	▼0.45
CPI(M)	Baljit Singh	546	0.41	New entry
Independent	Gurmit Singh	499	0.37	New entry
APP	Jasvir Singh	396	0.29	New entry
Independent	Gurminder Kaur	305	0.23	New entry
Majority		25,576	19.00	
Turnout		135,658	77.19	
Registered electors		175,752		
AAP gain from SAD		Swing		

=== 2012 ===
Punjab Assembly election, 2012: Jagraon
Party	Candidate	Votes	%	±%
SAD	Shiv Ram Kaler	53,031	43.49	▲2.06
INC	Ishar Singh	52,825	43.32	▲1.09
PPoP	Major Singh	9,546	7.83	New entry
Independent	Rajesh Inder Singh Sidhu	3,158	2.59	New entry
BSP	Rishi Dev	1,085	0.89	▲0.04
SAD(A)	Kewal Singh	477	0.39	New entry
Majority		206	0.17	
Turnout		121,950	76.36	
SAD gain from INC		Swing		

=== 2007 ===
Punjab Assembly election, 2007: Jagraon
Party	Candidate	Votes	%	±%
INC	Gurdeep Singh Bhaini	46,084	42.23	▲35.37
SAD	Bhag Singh Mallah	45,211	41.43	▲6.49
CPI	Gurdeep Singh Moti	11,430	10.47	New entry
Independent	Ravinder Pal Singh	2,765	2.53	New entry
Independent	Harbans Singh	1,049	0.96	New entry
BSP	Bikram Pal	931	0.85	▼0.35
Majority		873	0.80	
Turnout		109,133		
INC gain from SAD		Swing		

=== 2002 ===
Punjab Assembly election, 2002: Jagraon
Party	Candidate	Votes	%	±%
SAD	Bhag Singh Mallah	32,152	34.94	▼13.46
Independent	Darshan Singh Brar	30,595	33.25	New entry
LBP	Jagjit Singh Lopon	21,014	22.84	New entry
INC	Paramjit Singh Sibia	6,315	6.86	▼26.61
BSP	Piara Singh	1,101	1.20	New entry
LJP	Darshan Singh	841	0.91	New entry
Majority		1,557	1.69	
Turnout		92,018	64.57	
SAD hold		Swing		

=== 1997 ===
Punjab Assembly election, 1997: Jagraon
Party	Candidate	Votes	%	±%
SAD	Bhag Singh Mallah	46,034	48.40	New entry
INC	Darshan Singh Brar	27,080	28.47	▼36.22
Independent	Jagjit Singh	21,574	22.68	New entry
Independent	Manpreet Kaur	432	0.45	New entry
NOTA	None of the above			
Majority		18,954	19.93	
Turnout		95,120	70.60	
SAD gain from INC		Swing		

=== 1992 ===
Punjab Assembly election, 1992: Jagraon
Party	Candidate	Votes	%	±%
INC	Darshan Singh Brar	8,190	64.69	▲38.76
BJP	Ayudhia Prakash	2,649	20.92	New entry
BSP	Piara Singh	1,822	14.39	New entry
NOTA	None of the above			
Majority		5,541	43.76	
Turnout		12,661	10.59	▼
INC gain from SAD		Swing		

=== 1985 ===
Punjab Assembly election, 1985: Jagraon
Party	Candidate	Votes	%	±%
SAD	Gurdip Singh	26,683	42.60	▲2.15
INC	Amarjit Kaur	16,246	25.93	▼24.47
CPI	Om Prakash	8,615	13.75	New entry
Independent	Munshi Ram	8,329	13.30	New entry
NOTA	None of the above			
Majority		10,437	16.66	
Turnout		62,642	62.62	
SAD gain from INC(I)		Swing		

=== 1980 ===
Punjab Assembly election, 1980: Jagraon
Party	Candidate	Votes	%	±%
INC(I)	Jagrup Singh	30,943	50.40	▲11.98
SAD	Harjinder Singh	24,834	40.45	▲1.76
JP(S)	Harbhajan Singh	5,349	8.71	New entry
NOTA	None of the above			
Majority		6,109	9.95	
Turnout		61,394	63.58	
INC(I) gain from SAD		Swing		

=== 1977 ===
Punjab Assembly election, 1977: Jagraon
Party	Candidate	Votes	%	±%
SAD	Dalip Singh	22,564	38.69	▼12.72
INC	Jagrup Singh	22,408	38.42	▼8.99
Independent	Gurcharan Singh	11,825	20.28	New entry
RPI	Mohinder Singh	1,251	2.15	New entry
NOTA	None of the above			
Majority		156	0.27	
Turnout		58,317	66.32	
SAD hold		Swing		

=== 1972 ===
Punjab Assembly election, 1972: Jagraon
Party	Candidate	Votes	%	±%
SAD	Tara Singh	29,143	51.41	▲
INC	Nahar Singh	26,876	47.41	▼
Independent	Niranjan Singh	669	1.18	New entry
NOTA	None of the above			
Majority		2,267	4.00	
Turnout		56,688	73.64	
SAD gain from INC		Swing		

=== 1969 ===
Punjab Legislative Assembly Election, 1969: Jagraon
Party	Candidate	Votes	%	±%
INC	Nahar Singh	25,266		▲
SAD	Dalip Singh	24,577		▼
Majority		689		
Turnout				
INC hold		Swing		

=== 1967 ===
Punjab Legislative Assembly Election, 1967: Jagraon
Party	Candidate	Votes	%	±%
INC	G. Singh	20,660		▲
SAD	D. Singh	18,173		▼
Majority		2,487		
Turnout				
INC gain from SAD		Swing		

=== 1962 ===
Punjab Legislative Assembly Election, 1962: Jagraon
Party	Candidate	Votes	%	±%
SAD	Lachhman Singh Gill	22,811		▲
INC	Harparkash Kaur	15,265		▼
Majority		7,546		
Turnout				
SAD gain from INC		Swing		

=== 1957 ===
Punjab Legislative Assembly Election, 1957: Jagraon
Party	Candidate	Votes	%	±%
INC	Harparkash Kaur	20,452		▲
Independent	Lachhman Singh Gill	13,247		New entry
Majority		7,205		
Turnout				
INC gain from SAD		Swing		

=== 1952 ===
Punjab Legislative Assembly Election, 1952: Jagraon
Party	Candidate	Votes	%	±%
SAD	Iqbal Singh	31,395		▲
INC	Jaswant Rai	15,067		▼
Majority		16,328		
Turnout				
SAD hold		Swing		

=== Bypoll 1951 ===
Bypoll, 1951: Jagraon
Party	Candidate	Votes	%	±%
SAD	Gopal Singh Khalsa	28,179		New entry
INC	Kehar Singh	14,272		New entry
Majority		13,907		
Turnout				
