= B.S. Sandhu =

Former Director General of Police, Haryana

B. S. Sandhu
- Born: 6 September 1958 (age 67); Panchkula, Haryana
- Spouse: Kiran Kaur Sandhu
- Police career
- Department: Haryana Police
- Service years: 1984 - 2019
- Rank: Director General of Police
- Awards: President's Police Medal

Baljit Singh Sandhu (born 6 September 1958), better known as B.S. Sandhu, is a retired Indian Police Service (IPS) officer of 1984 batch who served as the Director General of Police (DGP) of Haryana from April 2017 to January 2019. He is recipient of President’s Police Medal for distinguished service in 2011.

== Biography ==
Sandhu was born in Ravidassia family on 6 September 1958 in Panchkula, Haryana. On 28 April 2017, Sandhu was appointed as the Director General of Police (DGP) of Haryana, a position he held until 31 January 2019.

Some notable work of Sandhu includes the foundation of D.A.V Police Public School in 1994, which has now grown to teach over 22,000 children across 22 schools throughout Haryana, is one of Sandhu's noteworthy accomplishments.

Additionally, he established the "Gulabi Mahila Thana" (Pink Women Police Station) in Panchkula to give women a safe location to report crimes and started "Operation Durga," a program to stop sexual harassment and eve-teasing in public areas.

Since his retirement he has been actively involved with the Guru Ravidas community. As an administrator of Guru Ravidas Temple, Panchkula, he conducted peaceful elections. He donated Rs 5 lakh to Guru Ravidas Sabha. On the occasion of Guru Ravidas Jayanti, he joined Bharatiya Janata Party (BJP) in February 2024, where he was welcomed into the party by Chief Minister Manohar Lal Khattar and other senior leaders.

== See also ==
- Malkiat Singh Jakhu
- Kulwant Kumar Sarangal
- Kamal Attri
- Chamar
