= Balarama (disambiguation) =

Balarama is the elder brother of Krishna in Hinduism and Jainism

Balarama may also refer to:

- Balarama (elephant), the lead elephant of the Mysore Dasara procession
- Bālarama (magazine), an Indian comic book in the Malayalam language
- Balarama Dasa, Odia poet
- Balarama Deva, 16th century ruler of Western Odisha
- Balarama Holness, former professional Canadian football player
- Balram, a fictional Indian character played by Mammootty in films such as Inspector Balram (1991) and Balram vs. Tharadas (2006)

== See also ==
- Baladeva (disambiguation)
- Balrampur district (disambiguation)
