= Malkiat Singh (police officer) =

Indian police officer

Director General of Police Malkiat Singh
- Born: Jalandhar, Punjab
- Police career
- Department: Uttar Pradesh Police
- Service years: 1977 - 2011
- Rank: Director General of Police
- Awards: President's Police Medal

Malkiat Singh, also known as Malkiat Singh Jakhu, is a 1977-batch Indian Police Service (IPS) officer who served in the Uttar Pradesh cadre.

== Early life ==
He was born in Ravidassia family of Village Bal in Jalandhar. He completed his postgraduate degree in political science from DAV College Jalandhar.

== Professional Life ==
Over the decades, within the Uttar Pradesh State, he held several key positions during his distinguished career, including serving as the Director General of Police (DGP) and heading the Intelligence Wing of the Uttar Pradesh Police. Following his retirement from active police service, the Uttar Pradesh Government appointed him as Chairman of the Uttar Pradesh Public Service Commission (UPPSC).

== Awards ==
He is a recipient of the President's Police Medal for distinguished service, which was awarded by the President of India on Independence Day.

== See also ==
- Kamal Attri
- B.S. Sandhu
- Kulwant Kumar Sarangal
- Shakuntala Jakhu
