= Charanjit Kaur Bajwa =

Indian politician

Member of Punjab Legislative Assembly
- In office 2012 - 2017
- Preceded by: Lakhbir Singh Lodhinangal
- Succeeded by: Fatehjang Singh Bajwa
- Constituency: Qadian

Personal details
- Born: 25 June 1959 (age 67) Patiala
- Party: Indian National Congress
- Spouse: Pratap Singh Bajwa
- Children: Vikram Partap Bajwa (1 Son)

Charanjit Kaur Bajwa is an Indian politician and a member of Indian National Congress. She was Member of Punjab Legislative Assembly and represented Qadian. She is the wife of the former Punjab Pradesh Congress committee president and Ex Member of the Lok Sabha from Gurdaspur Pratap Singh Bajwa (now MLA).

== Political career ==
Bajwa was elected to the Punjab Legislative Assembly in 2012 from Qadian. She was one of the 42 INC MLAs who submitted their resignation in protest of a decision of the Supreme Court of India ruling Punjab's termination of the Sutlej-Yamuna Link (SYL) water canal unconstitutional.
