= Natkhat Khel Mahotsav =

Annual sport festival in Bihar, India

- Tournament logo
- Countries: India
- Headquarters: Bangaon, Bihar, India
- First edition: 2021
- Latest edition: 2024
- Next edition: 2026
- Website: natkhatkhel.com

Natkhat Khel Mahotsav is an annually held multi-sports event held in Bangaon, Saharsa, Bihar, India.

== Beginning of the event ==
In Bangaon, Krishnashtami fair is a much celebrated event during which, traditionally, wrestling was played by the village elders just prior to idol immersion. In continuation of this sports practice, some village youths, started a multi-sports event coinciding with this fair in the year of 2021 with Kabaddi being the prime sports of the event along with other sports event such as Volleyball. A major focus of this event is to encourage youth participation, with a particular focus on women's sports and bring forth rural talent on the state and national platform. The most recent edition (2024) of this festival saw Female Kabaddi as the prime focus of the festival which was declared as a state level tournament of the Government.

== History and background ==
The festival originated as part of the Shri Krishna Janmashtami Mela, initially a small community event in Bangaon. Over the years, the event has gradually grown into one of the largest sports festivals of Bihar, transitioning from a local fair to a state-level sports event. This annual event was established with the mission to revive traditional Indian sports and provide a platform for emerging athletes from rural setup who do not have enough reach to showcase their talent at state and national platforms.

The inaugural event (started in 2021) saw participation of 489 athletes representing 12 districts of Bihar in which they took part in 16 sporting events, including kabaddi (for both boys and girls), chess, cart racing, solah gadhia, bridge, track and field events, and cycling races to name a few. In 2022, it saw overwhelming participation from the entire Mithilanchal, Seemanchal, and Ang regions of the state, with over 5,000 sports personnel representing 32 districts of the state. In this event, state Gold Cup Kabaddi was launched in the presence of national coach Rana Ranjit Sigh. By 2024, it had evolved into a statewide event with the inclusion of the Bihar State Women's Kabaddi Championship.

== 2026 Edition of the Event ==
The 2026 edition of this event is slated to be held in the Month of November under the chairpersonship of Shri Niranjan Thakur with an expected participation of over ten thousand athletes. The week long event is scheduled to be inaugurated on November 18, 2026 and conclude on November 24, 2026.
