= Balrampur district =

Balrampur district may refer to either of these districts of India:

- Balrampur district, Chhattisgarh, with its capital in Balrampur, Chhattisgarh
- Balrampur district, Uttar Pradesh, with its capital in Balrampur, Uttar Pradesh

== See also ==
- Balarama (disambiguation)
