= Kulwant Kumar Sarangal =

Indian police officer

Kulwant Kumar Sarangal IPS, PPMDS

Additional Director General of Police, Maharashtra

Personal details
- Born: Amritsar, Punjab
- Occupation: IPS Officer
- Awards: President’s Police Medal for Distinguished Service
- Police career
- Department: Maharashtra Police
- Service years: 1990-2023
- Rank: Director General of Police

Kulwant Kumar Sarangal is a senior Indian Police Service (IPS) officer of the 1990 batch from the Maharashtra cadre, with over three decades of service in various capacities. His career has spanned across urban and rural policing, intelligence, security, and traffic management.

== Early life ==
Sarangal was born into a Ravidassia family and completed primary education from his native village, Mustafabad, Amritsar. Then he attended the Government Senior Secondary School, Verka. He completed his postgraduation in mathematics from Guru Nanak Dev University, Amritsar, in 1985. He holds the degree in law from Pune University.

== Professional Life ==
In 2012, he was appointed Commissioner of Police, Nashik, where he managed city policing and law-and-order operations. Prior to this appointment he served as Special Inspector General of Police, VIP Security, Mumbai, overseeing the protection of high-profile individuals and security arrangements for major events. He also held the position of Inspector General of Police (Security), Maharashtra State Intelligence Department, coordinating state-level intelligence and security operations. In later years, he was elevated to Additional Director General of Police (Establishment), responsible for police personnel management, postings, and transfers, and then to Additional Director General of Police (Traffic), Maharashtra, focusing on traffic management, road safety, and accident prevention across the state.

=== Sarangal's Role in Sidhu Moosewala Murder Investigation ===
He played a pivotal role in the investigation of the Sidhu Moosewala murder case. As the Additional Director General of Police (Law and Order), he led efforts that resulted in significant breakthroughs in the case. In June 2022, Pune Rural Police, under Sarangal's guidance, apprehended Santosh Jadhav and Navnath Suryavanshi from Gujarat. Jadhav, a sharpshooter associated with the Lawrence Bishnoi gang, was identified as a primary assailant in the murder. Suryavanshi was considered an accomplice. Following these arrests, further intelligence led to the capture of Siddhesh Hiraman Kamble, alias Mahakal, in Mumbai. Kamble, also linked to the Lawrence Bishnoi gang, was believed to have been involved in the conspiracy.

=== Awards ===
He received the President's Police Medal for distinguished service on Indian Independence Day 2016 for his long and distinguished service towards the community.

== See also ==
- Malkiat Singh Jakhu
- Jagmohan Singh Raju
