= Gopal Singh Khalsa =

Indian politician

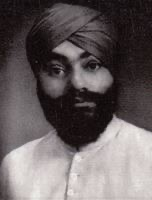

Leader of opposition in Punjab assembly
- In office 17 April 1952 – 1 November 1956
- Preceded by: First holder
- Succeeded by: Gurnam Singh
- Constituency: Jagraon

Member of Punjab Legislative Assembly
- In office 1952–1957
- Preceded by: Post Established
- Succeeded by: Har Prakash Kaur
- Constituency: Jagraon

Member of Punjab Provincial Assembly
- In office 1937–1946
- Constituency: Ludhiana

Personal details
- Born: 1903
- Died: 1979 (aged 75–76)
- Party: Scheduled Castes Federation (1947-1952), Shiromani Akali Dal (1952-1956), Indian National Congress (1956-till his death)
- Spouse: Basant Kaur
- Children: Harinder Singh Khalsa
- Education: Panjab University

Gopal Singh Khalsa OBE (1903-1979) was an Indian independence activist and politician.

== Life ==
Khalsa was born in 1903 into Ramdasia Sikh family at a village around Sidhwan Bet area.

He did his schooling from Malwa Khalsa High School in Ludhiana and B.A from Panjab University. Khalsa went to the United States in 1923 and spent three years there and did LLB from the San Joaquin Delta College, Stockton (California).

He also received Order of the British Empire.

== Political career ==
=== Before Independence ===
Later, joined the Hindustan National Party and finally returned to India in 1931. After his return, he took keen interest in the welfare of the Dalits and joined the All India Scheduled Castes Federation of B. R. Ambedkar.

He was a member of the S. C. F. Working Committee and a close associate of Dr Ambedkar from 1937 to 1946. In 1937, he was elected as an independent candidate for the Punjab Provincial Assembly. He was then appointed Parliamentary Secretary to the Punjab Premier, Sikandar Hayat Khan.

From 1937 to 1946 he was also a nominated member of the District Board of Ludhiana, After the second world war in 1946, he was appointed as an officer in the Labour Department of the Government of India.

=== After Independence ===
In 1952 he joined the Akali Dal, ran on its ticket for the 1952, and became the Leader of the Opposition in the Punjab Legislative Assembly.

He had during his political career edited a couple of magazines and papers, and from 1952 to 1954 was Chief Editor of the Daily Prabhat, the Urdu spokesman of the Akali Dal.

In 1956 as a result of the merger of the Akali Dal with the Indian National Congress, he joined the latter organization. He played a prominent role in the organization of the Malwa Akali Dal to oppose Master Tara Singh and his Akali Dal in the 1959 elections to the Shiromani Gurdwara Parbandhak Committee.
