= Ujagar Singh Sekhwan =

Indian politician

Ujagar Singh Sekhwan (1924–1990) was an Indian politician from the state of Punjab. He is a former president of the Shiromani Akali Dal (SAD). He was born in the Sekhwan village of Gurdaspur district, Punjab. He was elected to the Punjab Legislative Assembly in 1977 and again in 1980 as a SAD candidate from the Kahnuwan assembly constituency. He was married to Tej Kaur. His son Sewa Singh Sekhwan was the minister for Information & Public Relations in Punjab.
