= Baladeva =

Baladeva can refer to:

- Balabhadra, among the sixty-three illustrious beings in Jainism
- Balarama, Hindu deity and the elder brother of Krishna
- Bala Dev Singh, fictional character in the 2019 Indian film Housefull 4, portrayed by Akshay Kumar
- Dorysthenes (Baladeva), a subgenus of beetles

== See also ==
- Baldev, an Indian masculine given name
- Balarama (disambiguation)
