= Saravjit Kaur Manuke =

Indian politician (born 1972)

Member of Punjab Legislative Assembly
- Incumbent
- Assumed office 2017
- Preceded by: S. R. Kaler
- Constituency: Jagraon

Deputy leader of opposition Punjab
- In office May 2017 – 11 March 2022

Personal details
- Born: 25 July 1972 (age 54) Jagraon, Punjab, India
- Party: Aam Aadmi Party

Saravjit Kaur Manuke (25 July 1972) is an Indian politician and the MLA in the Punjab Legislative Assembly representing the Jagraon Assembly constituency. She is a member of the Aam Aadmi Party.

The first time she contested election in 2017 on the ticket of Aam Aadmi Party and won. In May 2017 she was elected Deputy Leader of Opposition in Punjab Assembly.

== Early life ==
She has M.Com and M.A. in Economics, degrees.

== Political career ==
Saravjit Kaur Manuke was employed in the teaching profession at the beginning of her career. She then quit her job and joined the Aam Aadmi Party, founded by prominent Indian politician Arvind Kejriwal.

=== Member of Legislative Assembly (First term) ===
She contested the Jagraon Assembly constituency from the Aam Aadmi Party in the 2017 Punjab Legislative Assembly election. She won the elections for the first time. She defeated former Punjab state government minister, vice-president of the Punjab state Congress committee and veteran politician Malkiat Singh Dakha, who was twice elected as an MLA in the Punjab assembly.

Saravjit Kaur Manuke received 61,521 votes, which is 45.69% of the total votes cast.

Aam Aadmi Party emerged as the main opposition party in the Punjab Assembly elections of 2017. Aam Aadmi Party secured 20 seats in the Punjab Assembly in the Punjab Assembly elections of 2017. Saravjit Kaur Manuke was elected by the Aam Aadmi Party in Punjab as deputy leader of AAP legislative party during the term of the Fifteenth Punjab Legislative Assembly. During her time in office, Harpal Singh Cheema was the Leader of the Opposition in Punjab.

In June 2021, Manuke held hunger strike along with AAP activists to protest against the inaction of the Punjab government in the payment of post-matric scholarship amount of Dalit students. AAP Punjab president Bhagwant Mann said that the protest by AAP members had forced the Punjab government led by CM Amarinder Singh to release the funds amounting to 200 crore as 40% share of the amount that Punjab government had to pay.

Her term ended with the dissolution of the Fifteenth Punjab assembly on 11 March 2022. The dissolution was necessitated after the results of the election were declared on 10 March.

Committee assignments of Punjab Legislative Assembly

- Member Committee on Questions & References
- Member Committee on Papers laid/to be laid on the table and Library
- Member Committee on Subordinate Legislation

=== Member of Legislative Assembly (Second term) ===
She was reelected from Jagraon in the 2022 Punjab Legislative Assembly election. She defeated the SAD candidate, a former MLA and bureaucrat, by more than 39,000 votes. The Aam Aadmi Party gained a strong 79% majority in the sixteenth Punjab Legislative Assembly by winning 92 out of 117 seats in the 2022 Punjab Legislative Assembly election. MP Bhagwant Mann was sworn in as Chief Minister on 16 March 2022.

Committee assignments of Punjab Legislative Assembly

- Chairperson (2022–23) Committee on Co-operation and its allied activities

== Social service ==
She is involved in social service outside politics. She is involved with the Jagraon Economic Club.

== Electoral performance ==
Assembly Election 2017: 70. Jagraon
Party	Candidate	Votes	%	±%
AAP	Saravjit Kaur Manuke	61,521	45.69	New entry
INC	Malkit Singh Dakha	35,945	26.69	▼16.63
SAD	Amarjit Kaur Sahoke	33,295	24.72	▼18.77
Independent	Avtar Singh Billa	1,564	1.16	New entry
NOTA	None of the above	996	0.74	
BSP	Subedar Sadhu Singh Tappar	591	0.44	▼0.45
CPI(M)	Baljit Singh	546	0.41	New entry
Independent	Gurmit Singh	499	0.37	New entry
APP	Jasvir Singh	396	0.29	New entry
Independent	Gurminder Kaur	305	0.23	New entry
Majority		25,576	19.00	
Turnout		135,658	77.19	
Registered electors		175,752		
AAP gain from SAD		Swing		

Assembly Election 2022: Jagraon
Party	Candidate	Votes	%	±%
AAP	Saravjit Kaur Manuke	65,195	51.95	▲6.26
SAD	Shiv Ram Kaler	25,539	20.35	▼4.37
INC	Jagtar Singh Jagga Hissowal	20,878	16.64	▼10.05
SAD(A)	Parivar Singh Dalla	5,179	4.13	New entry
BJP	Kanwar Narinder Singh	4,476	3.57	New entry
NOTA	None of the above	1,057	0.84	
Majority		39,656	31.6	
Turnout		125,503		
Registered electors		184,819		
AAP hold				

Political offices
Preceded by -	Deputy leader of opposition in 15th Punjab Assembly; 2017 – 2022	Succeeded by Raj Kumar Chabbewal
State Legislative Assembly
Preceded by S. R. Kaler	Member of the Punjab Legislative Assembly from Jagraon Assembly constituency 2017 –	Incumbent
