= Shiv Ram Kaler =

Indian politician and civil servant

Member of Punjab Legislative Assembly
- In office 6 March 2012 – 11 March 2017
- Governor: Shivraj Patil
- Preceded by: Gurdeep Singh Bhaini
- Succeeded by: Saravjit Kaur Manuke
- Constituency: Jagraon

Personal details
- Born: Ludhiana, Punjab, India
- Party: Shiromani Akali Dal

Shiv Ram Kaler also known as S.R. Kaler is a retired Bureaucrat and a politician affiliated with the Shiromani Akali Dal (SAD). He represented the Jagraon constituency in the Punjab Legislative Assembly.

== Background ==
=== Early life ===
Shiv Ram Kaler was born to Ujagar Ram Kaler into a Ravidassia family.

=== Former Civil Servant ===
Prior to entering politics, Kaler served as a Punjab Civil Services Officer until November 2011. He was appointed as Additional Deputy Commissioner, Ludhiana.

=== Politics ===
S. R. Kaler, representing the Shiromani Akali Dal (SAD), was elected as the MLA from the Jagraon constituency in the 2012 Punjab Legislative Assembly election, winning with 53,031 votes, narrowly defeating INC’s Ishar Singh who received 52,825 votes. In the 2022 elections, S. R. Kaler contested again but lost to Saravjit Kaur Manuke of the Aam Aadmi Party by a margin of 39,656 votes.

During his tenure as an MLA, S.R. Kaler held significant positions in the Punjab Legislative Assembly:

- Chairman: Committee on Petitions
- Member: Committee on Public Accounts
- Member: Committee on Welfare of Scheduled Castes and Backward Classes

== Electoral performance ==
Punjab Assembly election, 2012: Jagraon
Party	Candidate	Votes	%	±%
SAD	Shiv Ram Kaler	53,031	43.49	▲2.06
INC	Ishar Singh	52,825	43.32	▲1.09
PPoP	Major Singh	9,546	7.83	New entry
Independent	Rajesh Inder Singh Sidhu	3,158	2.59	New entry
BSP	Rishi Dev	1,085	0.89	▲0.04
SAD(A)	Kewal Singh	477	0.39	New entry
Majority		206	0.17	
Turnout		121,950	76.36	
SAD gain from INC		Swing		

Punjab Assembly election, 2017: Nihal Singhwala
Party	Candidate	Votes	%	±%
AAP	Manjit Singh Bilaspur	67,313	44.5	
INC	Rajwinder Kaur	39,739	26.3	
SAD	S.R. Kaler	34,865	23.0	
NOTA	None of the above	1,010	0.5	
Majority		27,574	18.3	
Turnout		150,363	78.7	
Registered electors		192,376		

Assembly Election 2022: Jagraon
Party	Candidate	Votes	%	±%
AAP	Saravjit Kaur Manuke	65,195	51.95	▲6.26
SAD	Shiv Ram Kaler	25,539	20.35	▼4.37
INC	Jagtar Singh Jagga Hissowal	20,878	16.64	▼10.05
SAD(A)	Parivar Singh Dalla	5,179	4.13	New entry
BJP	Kanwar Narinder Singh	4,476	3.57	New entry
NOTA	None of the above	1,057	0.84	
Majority		39,656	31.6	
Turnout		125,503		
Registered electors		184,819		
AAP hold				

== See also ==
- Sucha Ram Ladhar
- Jagmohan Singh Raju
