= Bangaon, Bihar =

Bangaon
- city
- Location in Bihar, India Bangaon (India)
- Coordinates: 25.866°N 86.50°E
- Country: India
- State: Bihar
- Region: Mithila
- District: Saharsa
- Elevation: 41 m (135 ft)

Languages
  - Official: Hindi, Maithili
- Time zone: IST
- Area code: 06478
- ISO 3166 code: IN-BR

Bangaon, a historic village in the Saharsa district of Bihar, is considered a village of intellectuals. In ancient & medieval times, it produced exceptional Vedic and Sanskrit scholars. In the present day, the village has at least 60 high-ranking bureaucrats, along with a large number of doctors, engineers, and professors. This village is predominantly inhabited by Brahmins. The village alone has 4 colleges and 11 schools. Some historians believe that 'Apannigam' referred in Buddhistic literature is Bangaon. Bangaon is part of Kahra Block of the district. Bangaon is divided into three panchayats (sub blocks) namely Bangaon North, Bangaon South and Bangaon East.

== Historical relevance ==
=== In Buddhist Literature ===
In Buddhist history, the entire Kosi region was referred as 'Anguttarap Janpad'. According to Ashvghosh, the capital of 'Anguttarap' was 'Apan' which was situated on the northern banks of river 'Mahee'. Several references of Gautam Buddha visiting 'Anguttarap' have been found. According to Vinaypitak, Gautam Buddha once visited Apannigam with 1250 Bhikshuks where he was received and entertained by Jatil Keniya (a Brahmin who had invited Gautam Buddha to come there. Here, Brahmin Sel became disciple of Gautam Buddha with his 300 followers and to celebrate this, Jatil keniya offered the drink Maureya. From here on, drinking Maureya became acceptable to the followers of Buddha. Apan Nigam was an important place in Anguttarap since it has been referred at several places in Buddhist literature. Several 'Sutas' were preached in 'Apan Nigam' of which Potaliya Suta, Latuki Kopmasuta, Sel Suta, and Apan Suta were important. However, historians are divided over whether Apan Nigam was actually present day Bangaon. Historian Mithila Saran Pandey believes that Apan Nigam was some place in Kosi region north of Ganga, whereas famous historian Havaldar Tripathi opines that place Apan Nigam is none other than Bangaon which is three Kilometres north west of kandaha( a village which is compared with Keniya vaah or Samta Kaniya village of Buddhist times). Buddha stayed at Jaatiya Van (present day Devan Van) and the Brahmin Sel was from present day Sihaul Village.

=== Bangaon Copper Plate ===
Bangaon Copper Plate (or Bangaon Plate), found in 1950, is an inscription of Pal dynasty. It belonged to Pandit Ghughur Jha, a teacher of Kalawati High School, and was later examined by noted Indian historian and epigraphist Dineshchandra Sircar. It measures 13.4"X12.2"X1.5"(LWH) and weighs 425 Taul (or 5 ser 5 chhataak) and is known to have been engraved during the rule of Vigrahapala III (1050-1076 AD). This plate, containing 51 lines, is of 17th year of Vigrahapala III's rule and is inscribed on both sides. This charter is issued from Kanchanpur Which suggests Kanchanpur being a temporary capital of the Pala's. Kanchanpur is presumed to be present day Kandaha village where the only Sun Temple of north Bihar is situated. This charter is related to a land grant by Ghantisa (a royal officer) of his own possessions (Jagir) to the Pal King. The plate mentions that on the day of Vishwat sankaranti, after religious bath and worshipping of Buddha, the land was donated to a Bramhin. It suggests that people of that time were aware of Puranas since ksheer-saarag and dugdhambodhi related to Pauranik Kathas have been mentioned. It also sheds light on the influence of Buddhist culture during those days since on the 37th line of the plate buddhabhattarkamuddhishya is inscribed in which king Gopal has been compared with Gautam Buddha.

== Land, farming and village life ==
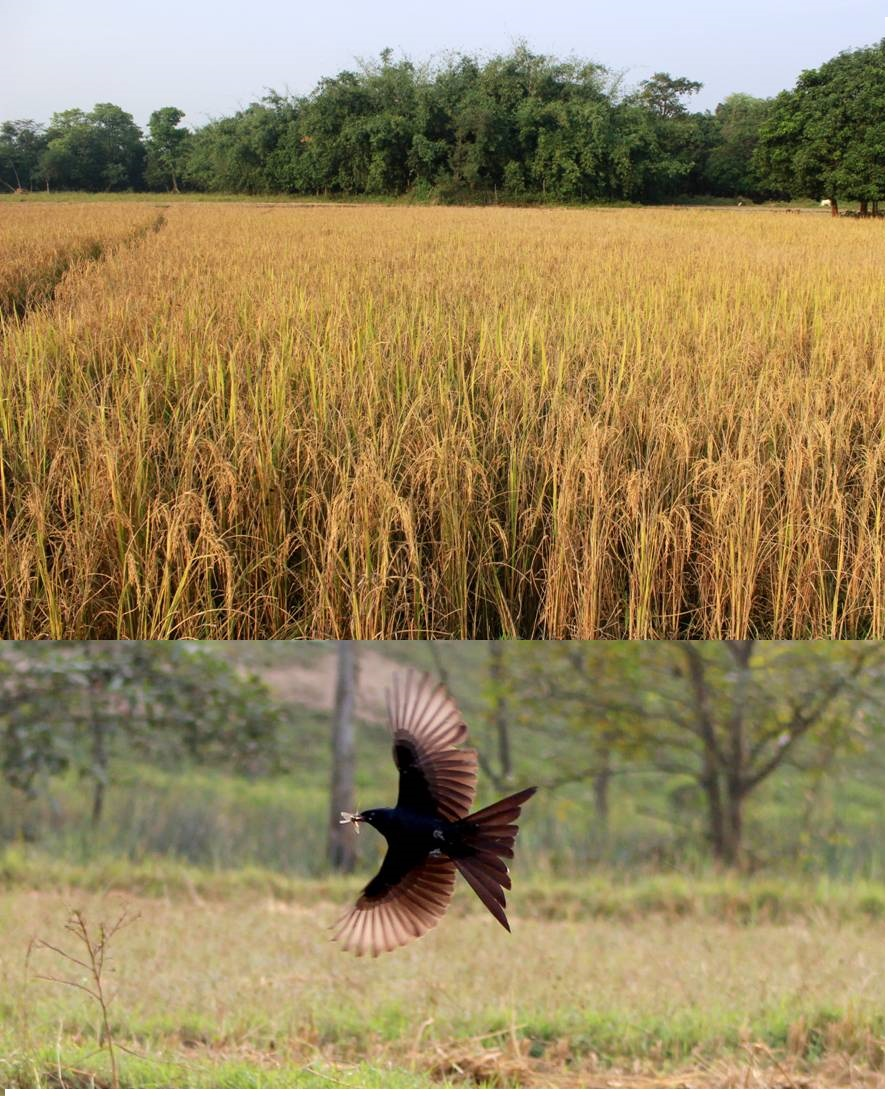
(Top) A ripe paddy crop in eastern Bangaon farmlands (Bottom) A cuckoo feasting on a grasshopper after harvesting in a paddy field in Bangaon.

Bangaon and its surrounding areas are part of the Kosi river basin. The western Kosi embankment is only eight kilometres west to this village. The farmers in the village mostly cultivate Dhaan (paddy crop), Makai (Maize/Corn), Gahum (Wheat) and Moong (a type of lentil) in their farms. Since the climate of this region is most suitable for Dhaan (the paddy crop), a good crop brings happiness to many farmers in the village. Though, people do try to grow wheat crops, only few farmers get good yields. Most of the farmers have moderate harvest and hence it is not as popular as harvesting of Dhaan. Instead, maize is the second best crop for the farmers of this village. Therefore, they are tempted to grow Garma Dhaan (a unique type of paddy crop for summer farming) and Makai (maize) crops together apart from harvesting regular crops. The reaping of the Dhaan crop starts somewhere around mid November and is usually followed by some of the most important Hindu festivals namely Durga Puja and Diwali. Six days after Diwali brings another festival called Chhath which is one of major festivals of Bihar. In between, Diwali and Chhath is another festival that is known as Bhardootiya (Bhai Dooj) in which brothers go to see their sisters. The fresh crop of Dhaan reaches every home. It can be cooked straight or flattened to make Chura, which can be ombined with fresh Sakkar (Jaggery) and "Dahi" (Curd).

== Society, religion and safety ==
The village population consists of Maithil Brahmins mostly. Brahmins, by definition of the social classification in ancient India, are the highest ranked. The Brahmins are traditionally supposed to have teaching as their profession. The original settlers of this village also called as Kujilvars or Dihvars (landlords) have the surname "Khan" (a well known title of upper class Muslims) known for Brahmins. The reason for this title has its own controversy, but mostly believed that the title was awarded by the Mughal sultanate (administration) for their contribution as tax collectors. Incidentally the main population of this village belongs to Katyayan Gotra whose ancestor Amatya also known as Mudra Rakshas (A ferocious tax collector) during Chandra Gupta period, responsible for laying the foundation of the Golden period of India. Some historians believe that he was the one also called Kautilya who wrote the famous book on Administration Arthshashtra. Though many historians believe that the Kautilya was none other than Chanakya himself. In recent time Shri Ram Chandra Khan retired as Inspector General of the state Bihar was known for his able administration also belongs to the same clan. After independence this population of Maithil Brahmins have been involved in all profession like Administration, Engineers, Doctors, farming, business, serving the military and para-military forces to name a few. Apart from Brahmins, many others belonging to the lower castes also reside (though many of these lower caste people are moving out to adjacent places to village as they need more space for their growing family). These include, dusaadhs, chamaars, Musahars, Kumhaars, Nauwa (nai) and Paseeba (a caste whose living comes through serving Nature+home made alcoholic beverages called "Taari".). All these people mentioned before, are Hindus. However, there is a small percentage of Muslims as well who mostly live in the Miyaaantoli area of the village. These Muslims of the village rely predominantly on growing vegetables for their livelihood (often referred as Kujras).

It is believed that Babaji (Saint Laxminath Gosain) guards the village from all the evils and those who follow the road to sin, are taken care of by him. It is for this reason, no outsider eyes targeting Bangaon for committing crimes. The entire village is so well located that this area has never been affected by the flood of Koshi river. Even in the worst flood of 1984 the main village was safe and the water entered in the outskirts of this village. The entire village is one piece of land in the Govt gazette and all disputes pertaining to the share of land among the families are resolved amicably within the village community. Also, the design of roads by the farsighted social reformer of the village, Late Babua Khan is acknowledged for the safety despite being so immensely populated. Late Babua Khan also founded the Dharmasabha in the village. A memoir on Babua Khan written in the 1960s by Pandit Baldev Mishra was published in 2007.

== Natural calamities ==
The river Kosi, which is proverbially known as the sorrow of Bihar, has one of its embankment 8 km west to this village. Before this embankment came into existence, coping with flood was a routine thing for people of this area. However, since the 1950s when the embankment was made, there has been only one occasion when the village has been affected by the flood. This happened in September 1984 when the Kosi embankment breached near Nauhatta in Supaul district. Almost, all areas were submerged with the flood waters except the middle part of the village called the "Dhimka" (High land) which has sort of plateau shape. It is said then couple of villagers lost their lives in the water current. There was lot of damage to property and cattle. Barring this there hasn't been any incident of flood water entering to the village. In the recent flood and probably one of the most destructive floods ever, the village was totally unaffected. However, flooding or water logging due to heavy monsoon rains is a major reason for the poor connectivity of the area as bridges tend to get washed away. The scars of flood that came in 1984 and caused significant damage of property can still be seen in some parts.

Apart from floods, the seismic activity of Himalayan region is responsible for earthquakes that this village has faced. It is believed that the Indian plate is penetrating into the Eurasian plate at a rate of 5 cm/year. Because of this movement, this reason is prone to earthquakes too. In 1934, there was a massive earthquake in the village that caused much damage. Back again in 1988, there was a lower-intensity earthquake which affected only a few buildings in the village. None of the homes were toppled. On the night of quake in 1988, the electricity went out minutes before the earthquake took place in the wee hours. The dogs started barking unusually and there was a whistle kind of sound that shocked everybody. The ground started shaking and people rushed outside to seek refuge. The tube wells and wells in the village emitted water out but nobody was hurt. No earthquake has been experienced since then.

== Festivals and other functions ==
Of all the Hindu festivals, Holi, Krishnastami, Durga Puja, Diwali and Chhath are celebrated with full religious fervor. Others festivals like Rama Navami, Bhardutiya (Bhaiya dooj), Saraswati Puja, Kojagara, Sirua, etc. are also celebrated however not everybody seems involved hundred percent. On Holi and Krishnastami, artists from other places are invited to perform.

=== Holi ===
The celebration of Holi is sometimes two-day long. The first day being Dhurkhel (playing with dirt) and the second day for colours. Sometimes both of these are performed on the same day. The Holi festival in this village is normally celebrated one day in advance to the rest of the country. During the Holi festival, people get to meet each other. Many people from this village who live in other cities of India and abroad come back home on this occasion to be with their family. Traditionally, people used to go in groups beating drums and singing Holi songs and Jogiras. This festival serves as an occasion to see and greet each other. At few places, there are big stocks of bhang (a cannabis intoxicant) in the form of Dudhbhanga (milk laced with bhaang extracts and dry fruits), Tikri (a type of Indian sweet stuffed with bhaang) and bhangjilebi (another Indian sweet laced with bhaang). Elders are greeted with this intoxicant but youngsters also find a way to have this. This tradition of greeting people with bhaang at Dwar (a place where the gents guests are entertained) has been maintained by the family of seven brothers, eldest being Shri Bal Bhadra Khan of Bangaon West. In Western countries possession of marijuana is generally a crime but here it is a substitute of alcohol as those who drink alcohol are looked down upon. People generally believe that bhaang is a favourite beverage of Lord Shiva and therefore is acceptable, by and large, in the society. Once the durkhel and the colours are over, there is some classical music program where artists from other places are invited to perform. For many years, this was organised by a respected villager Shri Kameshwar Chaudhary who used to live in Jamshedpur. The classical music program used to be very popular amongst elders but most of the youngsters wouldn't seem interested.

=== Krishnastami ===
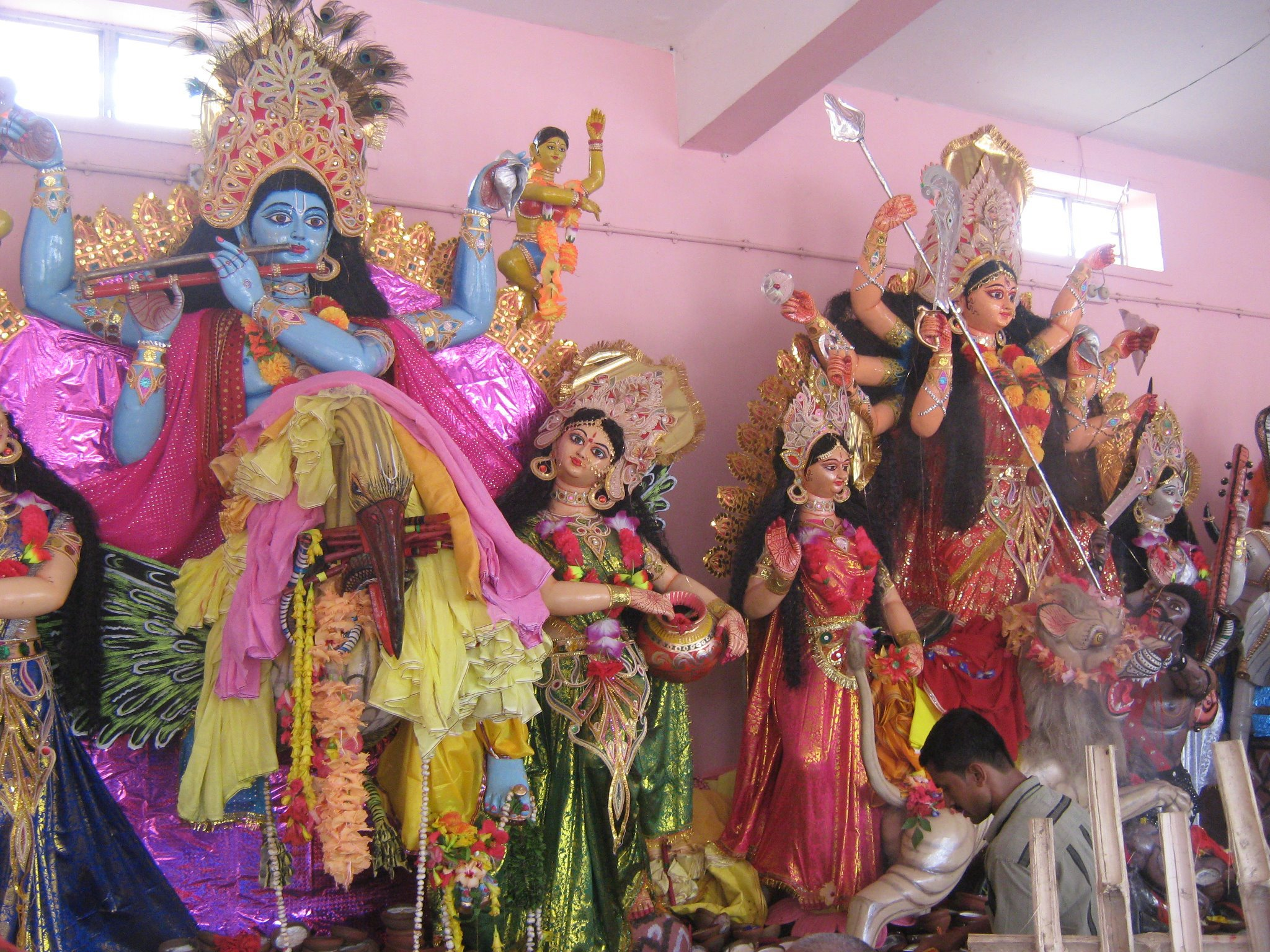
Idol of Lord Krishna displayed during Krishnashtmi (2011) fair.

Krishnastami is another festival where all the villagers can be seen participating. The major events of this festival are Janam (Krishna's birthday celebration), Mela (fair) and Bhasaan (immersion of the Krishna idol in Manua Dhaar which is a kosi rivulet nearest to the village). Because of Mela, many relatives from nearby villages visit. This is very popular for kids and younger people as well as females of the village. Kids go to this fair for buying toys that can't usually be bought because of the unavailability. For example, Digdigiya (a toy which has a drum attached to it and its plays when you move it), Cilema (kaleidoscope) Fukka (balloons) and many others. This kids also seem very interested in buying coloured goggles taking a ride of Jhoola (swing) and simply watching Maut ka Kuwaan (a motorbike stunt game). On the other hand, females seem interested in shopping cosmetics and some household items. The elder males feel happy in taking their grandchildren to the fair and shop for them. Usually elders are not seen shopping other than sweets and Paan. The writer of these lines still misses the Paan from Chaurasia Paan Bhandaar that used to come to the fair every year. During one of the mela nights, some artists from local orchestra parties would be invited. They would mostly play the peppy numbers. On some occasions a local male dancer, Bechana Natua (meaning the dancer named Bechana), would be seen attracting the mela goers. Natkhat Khel Mahotsav is a recently included multi-sports event which is celebrated during this fair each year since 2021.

=== Durga Puja ===
Durga Puja festival also brings many activities to the villagers. This is ten-day-long festival. Unlike other parts of the country here

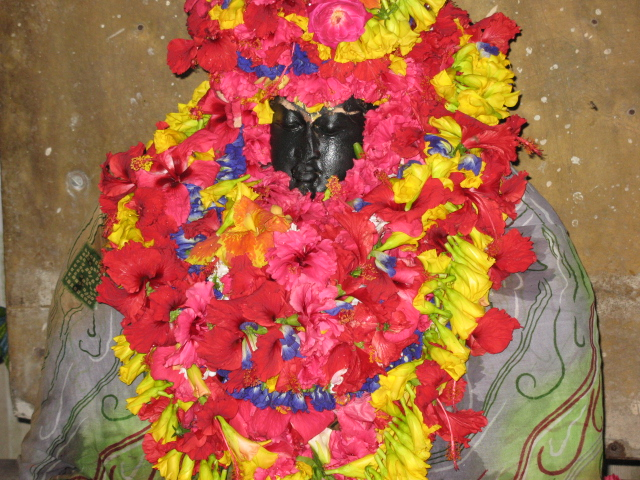
Idol of Goddess Durga inside the Durga Temple (May 2007).

Goddess Durga is worshipped in the form of Bhagwati. Bhagvati is an incarnation of Durga, whom Lord Ram had worshipped to be blessed with strength and weapons so that he can take on the mighty Ravan's army (a ruler of Lanka). The Bhagwati mandir is filled with devotees round the clock and there is non-stop Bhagwati Durga

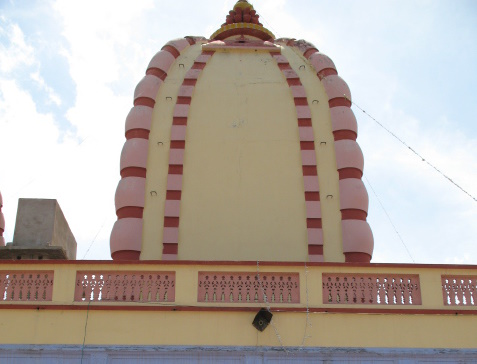
Dome of the Durga Temple (May 2007).

Saptashati recitation at the temple. On the eighth day of durga puja, a part of ritual, the goddess Durga is offered sacrifices in the form of Chhagars (young male goat kids) and Paaras (male buffaloes). Their sacrifices represent the end of Kaama (extreme carnal desires) and Krodha (extreme anger). While the Paaras are offered given to local Chamaars (who skin them and leave the body for the vultures in a place away from village). The chhagars are, however, accepted as god offering and eaten by people. These Chhagars and mostly skinned by local Paseebas who get skin, intestine, hoofs, balls and some money as their wage. The estimated number of Chhagars offered is around 500 (at Bangaon and Mahishi Bhagwati Mandir) on that day itself. Durga Puja ends on the tenth day from its beginning.

Despite being considered one of the educated villages of the state, such orthodox practices like Bali (of male buffaloes and goats) and other non-essential rituals have continued in the name of tradition. Some well respected villagers are in the profession of promoting these types of practices in though there is a growing interest and unrest in some of the villagers to stop such cruelties against the animals. As a part of that, people are trying to reduce the numbers of sacrifices and bring this number to only one para every year. On the tenth day, the People of the village celebrate Vijay Divas and youngsters take the blessings of Bujurgs (experienced elders) by offering Vijay Pranam and the Bujurgs (experienced elders) reciprocate by saying Chiranjivi Bhav (have a long life) or Vijayi Bhav (Be a winner). On that day all males of the village tie a Kush (a sacred grass from which Lord Ram's son Kush was born) at the portion of long hair backside (called Teek in Maithili). Then they leave their homes in groups and try to locate a bird called Nilkanth (this bird has blue neck) as it represents Lord Shiva on that day.

=== Babaji Samaroh ===
Babaji Samaroh is held every year on 5 December on the premises of Laxminath Gosain (Babajee) Temple. This temple is redeveloped by the people of Bangoan village and now anyone can visit this temple anytime.

== Education ==
=== Colleges ===
1. Sanskrit Maha Vidyalaya Bangaon.
2. Lakshminath Maha Vidyalaya Bangaon.
3. Jawhar Navoday Vidyalaya.
4. Shanti Mission Academy

=== Schools ===
1. Kalawati High School
2. Fooldai Kanya Ucch Vidyalaya
3. Moje lal Sharma Middle School
4. Jawahar Navoday Vidyalaya
5. Maheshwar Anant Madhya Vidyalaya
6. Draupadi Kanya Prathamik Vidyalaya
7. Rajkiya Sanskrit Prathmik Vidyalaya
8. Malhu School
9. Rajkiya (Bangala Gachhi) Prathamik Vidyalaya
10. Sanskrit Uchch Vidyalaya
11. Sarvrani Madhya Vidyalaya

== Banks ==
1. Bank of India.
2. State Bank of India.
3. Indian Post Office.
- Saharsa – the Municipality
- Saharsa district – the Municipality
- List of villages of Saharsa
