= Baldev Singh (basketball) =

Indian basketball player (born 1951)

Personal information
- Nationality: Indian
- Born: 3 January 1951 (age 74)

Sport
- Sport: Basketball

Baldev Singh (born 3 January 1951) is an Indian basketball player. He competed in the men's tournament at the 1980 Summer Olympics.
