= Baldev Mishra =

- Born: 1 November 1890; Bangaon, Bihar, India
- Died: 4 February 1975 (aged 84); Bangaon, Bihar, India
- Occupations: Writer, journalist, editor
- Spouse: Triveni Devi

Jyotishacharya Pandit Baldev Mishra was a prolific writer of Maithili literature in the 20th century who wrote extensively on several topics in his mother language Maithili. Besides Maithili, he also wrote few books in Hindi and Sanskrit covering a range of subjects related to mathematics, astrology, philosophy and history.

== Early life and education ==
Baldev Mishra was born in 1890 in Bangaon, Bihar in northern India. His father died when he was five years old. He was raised by his maternal grandfather in Bangaon. Due to his exceptional memory and ability to recite Durgasaptshati at a very young age, he was given a scholarship by the queen of the Baniali state to pursue further studies. In 1910, he went to Benaras to study astrology under the tutelage of pandit Sudhakar Dwivedi. During his Benaras stay, he met with Acharya Narendra Deva whose intellect inspired him to study in English medium. This led him to appear in a combined Bengal-Bihar-Orissa matriculation board exam which he passed in the first division in 1916.

== Career ==
In 1922 he was appointed as a mathematics teacher at the Kashi Vidyapeeth. He worked at the Kashi Vidyapeeth until 1930. After that, he wrote a few books in Sanskrit for high school students on Trigonometry and Algebra. He also edited books on Ellipse and Calculus written by Sudhakar Dwivedi.

In 1933, he started to work as an editor of "Pandit Patra". In 1939, he started working in "Saraswati Bhawan" library in Benaras where he worked on listing the manuscripts of many old articles there. He worked there until 1951. He then returned to his native state of Bihar in 1952 to work as decipherment research scholar in the newly formed K.P. Jayaswal Research Institute, Patna. Here, he worked on deciphering many articles related to Pali and Prakrit languages found during the excavations in Bodh Gaya. His work is published in 27 books in Tibbati-Pali-Prakrit series published by the Bihar Research society.

== List of works ==
Maithili (published books)

- Ramayan Shiksha (1939)
- Kavivar Pandit Chanda Jha (1948)
- Bharat Shiksha (1955)
- Gapshap Vivek (1961)
- Samaj (1963)
- Shyamanand sahay Vyakhyanamala (1970)

Maithili (Unpublished Books)

- Sanskriya sahitya me Maithil vidwaanak Krititva
- Maithili sahitya sevi lokanik Sansmaran
- Raja Tanknath Chaudharik Jeevani
- Kichhu Vishisth Lokak Jeevani
- Aatmakatha
- Parivartan

Maithili Essays (published in magazines)

- Mithila Mod
- Mithila Mihir
- Maithili
- Vaidehi
- Mithilajyoti
- Chaupari

Sanskrit (published books)

- Rekhaganitam
- Saral Trikonmiti
- Aryabhatteeyam (Edited)
- Chalan kalan (Edited)
- Deerghvritta (Edited)
- Bhaskareeya Beejganit (Edited)

Sanskrit Essays (published in magazines)

- Saraswati Sushma
- Suprabhatam

Hindi (published books)

- Chhatra Jeevan
- Satyasandha Padit Babua Khan (2007)
- Vidyapati Padavali-Bhaag -2 (Edited)

Hindi (unpublished books)

- Vishnupurana Par Vichaar
- Baudh Sahitya Me Kya Hai
- Jyotish Ke Nav Ratna
- Bharteeya Jyotish Shashtra Ki Utpatti
- Bangaon Ka Itihaas

== Makers of Indian literature (Maithili) ==
Recognizing his contributions to the Maithili literature, the Sahitya Akademi of India published a monograph on him under the Makers of Indian Literature (Maithili) series. One of his essays "sangeet" is included in the high school textbook of Maithili in Bihar state board. The monograph on him was written by Mr Visheshwara Mishra, a contemporary scholar of the Maithili literature. Sahitya academy started the series Makers of Indian Literature to recognize the contribution of eminent scholars who have contributed significantly to the literature of different languages spoken in India. The monograph is published in the original language of the writer and its translations are done in various other languages which are also published by the Sahitya Akademi.
