= Baldev Olakh =

Indian politician

Minister of State (Independent charge)
- Incumbent
- Assumed office 22 March 2017

Sardar Baldev Olakh is the state minister of Uttar Pradesh with independent charge.

== Political career ==
Sardar Baldev Olakh got the ministries of Minorities welfare, Irrigation (engineering).

== See also ==
- Yogi Adityanath ministry (2017–)
