= Fatehjang Singh Bajwa =

Indian politician

Punjab Legislative Assembly
- In office 2017–2022
- Preceded by: Charanjit Kaur Bajwa
- Succeeded by: Partap Singh Bajwa
- Constituency: Qadian

Personal details
- Born: March 2, 1958 (age 68)
- Party: BJP
- Profession: Politician

Fatehjang Singh Bajwa (born 2 March 1958) is a Bharatiya Janata Party leader and was a member of INC. In the 2017 Punjab Legislative Assembly election, he was elected as the member of the Punjab Legislative Assembly from Qadian.

In 2022 Punjab Legislative Assembly election he contested from Batala Assembly constituency but lost the election to Amansher Singh of Aam Aadmi Party. But he still continues his work in this field.
