= Baldev Singh Dhillon =

Indian academic (born 1947)

- Born: 27 June 1947; Amritsar, Punjab, British India
- Education: Khalsa College (B.Sc.); Punjab Agricultural University (M.Sc.); Indian Agricultural Research Institute (Ph.D.)
- Known for: Scientific breakthroughs in plant breeding
- Awards: DAAD Post-Doc. Fellowship.; Alexander von Humboldt (AvH) Post-Doc. Fellowship.; University of Hohenheim Post-Doc. Fellowship.; Fellow: Indian National Science Academy (FNA).; Fellow: National Academy of Agricultural Sciences, India (FNAAS).).; Fellow: National Academy of Sciences of India (FNASc).; NAAS Dr B.P. Pal Memorial Prize.; Rafi Ahmed Kidwai Memorial Prize of ICAR.; Om Prakash Bhasin Award.
- Scientific career
- Fields: Agricultural science (genetics)
- Workplaces: Punjab Agricultural University.; Indian Council of Agricultural Research; National Bureau of Plant Genetic Resources.; Guru Nanak Dev University.; University of Hohenheim.; University of Birmingham.; International Maize and Wheat Improvement Center, Mexico

Baldev Singh Dhillon (born 27 June 1947) is an Indian agricultural scientist. He is known for his contributions to plant breeding, genetics, and plant genetic resources, particularly in maize breeding. Currently, he is vice president of National Academy of Agricultural Sciences since January 2025. Previously he served as vice-chancellor of the Punjab Agricultural University from July 2011 to June 2021, leading the institution to notable recognition, including being ranked 2nd by the Indian Council of Agricultural Research (ICAR) in 2017.

Dhillon has held multiple roles such as assistant director general at the Indian Council of Agricultural Research, director of the National Bureau of Plant Genetic Resources, and director of research at Punjab Agricultural University and Guru Nanak Dev University. His international experience includes research positions at the University of Hohenheim, Germany, the International Maize and Wheat Improvement Center, Mexico, and the University of Birmingham, UK. Dhillon is fellow of National Academy of Sciences, India and Indian National Science Academy. Dhillon was honoured with the Padma Shri in 2019, Dhillon has published over 350 research papers and received multiple awards, including the Om Prakash Bhasin Award and the Dr. NL Dhawan Lifetime Achievement Award, for his contributions to agricultural science.

== Early life and education ==
Dhillon was born in Amritsar in 1947. He is known for scientific breakthroughs in plant breeding.

Dhillon did his B.Sc. in agriculture from Khalsa College, Amritsar; Post graduation M.Sc. from Punjab Agricultural University and Doctorate from the Indian Agricultural Research Institute (IARI), New Delhi. He has published 350 research publications and many books.

== National awards ==
- Padma Shri award 2019
