= Jagmohan Singh Raju =

Indian politician and civil servant

Jagmohan Singh Raju is a former bureaucrat and politician from the Punjab. He held roles as Joint Secretary in the Ministry of HRD's Department of Higher Education and Managing Director of SIDCO. After resigning from job in 2022, he entered into politics and was appointed general secretary of the BJP in Punjab. Raju won the 2013 UNESCO King Sejong Literacy Prize for his efforts to make 10 million Indians literate in five years.

== Biography ==
Raju was born into the family of former bureaucrat Karam Singh Raju. His ancestral origin lies in the Ravidassia caste, and his great-grandfather, Duni Chand, used to work as a leather worker. He has a PhD in public policy from the Tata Institute of Social Sciences (TISS) and has been a visiting fellow at Cambridge University (UK). His wife Anu Singh is also a bureaucrat and a member of the Central Board of Direct Taxes.

== Career ==
=== Bureaucratic career ===
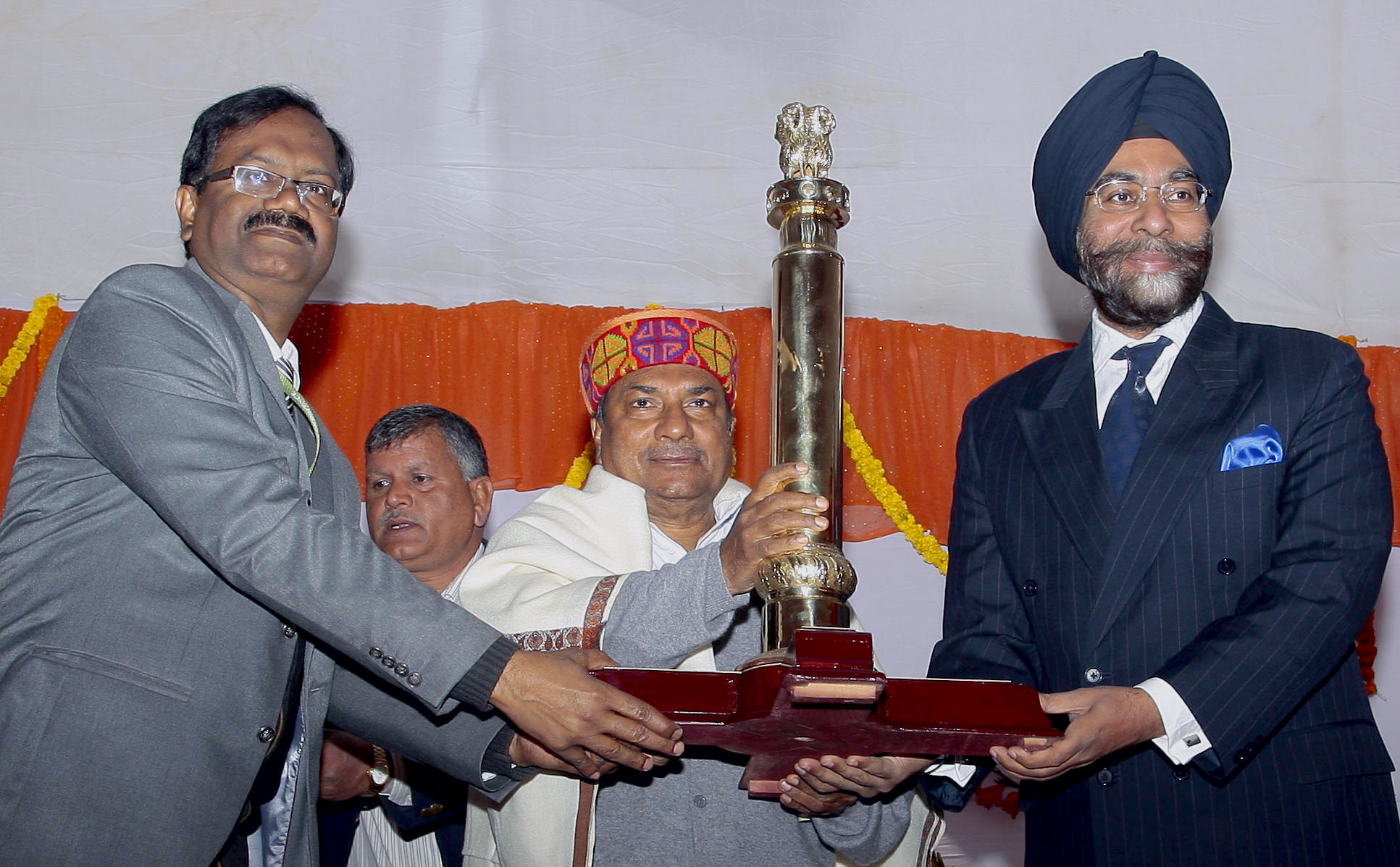
Defence Minister A.K. Antony presenting a trophy to Raju, for the best tableaux at the Republic Day Parade, in New Delhi on January 31, 2012

He joined the Indian Administrative Service (IAS) in 1985 and was assigned to the Tamil Nadu cadre. Over his tenure, held positions as Additional Chief Secretary, Commissioner of Land Reforms, and Chief Resident Commissioner of the Tamil Nadu House in New Delhi. He was also the Additional Chief Secretary/Chairman & MD of the Tamil Nadu Energy Development Agency at one point.

=== Political career ===
Raju took voluntary retirement from his bureaucratic career and was fielded as the BJP candidate against Navjot Singh Sidhu and Bikramjit Singh Majithia for the Amritsar East Assembly constituency during the 2022 Punjab Legislative Assembly election. Later he was appointed as Punjab BJP general secretary, and he resigned from this position in 2025, citing differences with the party's Amritsar (Urban) president.

== Caste discrimination ==
His appointment as Additional Secretary to the Government of India was blocked (or delayed) unlawfully, although his vigilance clearance (needed for promotion/empanelment) had earlier been cleared. Then Central Vigilance Commissioner (CVC), K.V. Chowdary, allegedly reopened inquiries into closed pseudonymous complaints just when his empanelment was under consideration in 2015.

Even after an investigation, a committee found no wrongdoing by Raju and he alleged that this 're-inquiry' was used as a tool to withhold clearance and stall his promotion. The National Commission for Scheduled Castes (NCSC), after examining, also found that he had been 'grossly discriminated and victimised.'

== Author ==
He authored a book named Ramrajya -The People’s Welfare State. The book is based on Raju's doctoral research and presents a vision of governance inspired by the concept of Ramrajya, an ideal state rooted in justice, equality, and welfare of all citizens. The book was launched at Lovely Professional University (LPU) during Raju's tenure as Additional Chief Secretary of Tamil Nadu.

== Awards ==
Raju won the 2013 UNESCO King Sejong Literacy Prize for his efforts to make 10 million Indians literate in five years.

== See also ==
- Ramendra Jakhu
- Shiv Ram Kaler
- Sucha Ram Ladhar
