= Baldev Singh (Punjab politician) =

Indian politician

Baldev Singh, (1889–1976) also known as master Baldev Singh was a freedom fighter and an Indian politician from the undivided Punjab before Haryana was carved out it. He served as a Member of Legislative Council (MLC) and as a three time Member of Legislative Assembly from Dirba Assembly constituency representing the Shiromani Akali Dal for three consecutive terms in 1977, 1980 and 1985.

== Early life ==
He was a pioneer of education in Haryana and was the founder of Jat Educational Societies in North India. He was an Arya Samajist and a Gandhian. He was also an advocate. He founded the Jat Association in Rohtak in 1913.

== Career ==
Singh became an MLA for the first time winning the 1977 Punjab Legislative Assembly election representing the Shiromani Akali Dal. He polled 25,591 votes and defeated his closest opponent, Hari Singh of the Indian National Congress,by a margin of 10,018 votes. He retained the seat for the Shiromani Akali Dal winning the 1980 Punjab Legislative Assembly election. In 1980, he polled 27,559 votes and beat Chitwant Singh of the Indian National Congress (Indira) by 6,063 votes. He won for the third consecutve time from Dirba seat polling 69,513 votes in the 1985 Punjab Legislative Assembly election and defeated his nearest rival, Jasvirinder Singh of the Indian National Congress, by a margin of 14,206 votes. He lost the next election in 1992 to Gurharan Singh of the Congress by 448 votes.
