= 1977 Punjab Legislative Assembly election =

Punjab Legislative Assembly Elections

- 1977

All 117 seats in the Punjab Legislative Assembly 59 seats needed for a majority
- Turnout: 65.37% (▼3.26%)
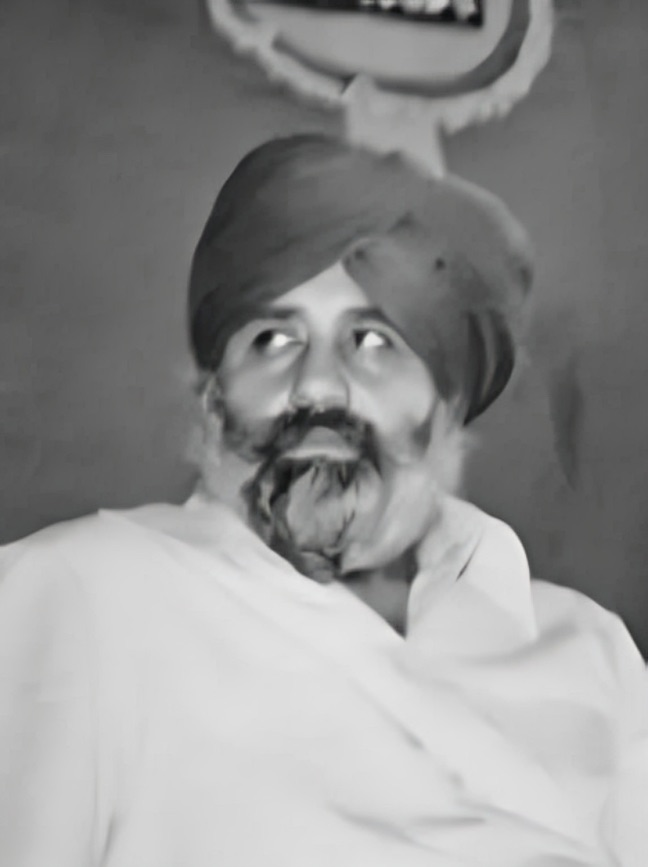

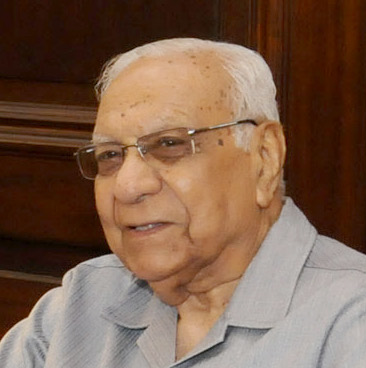

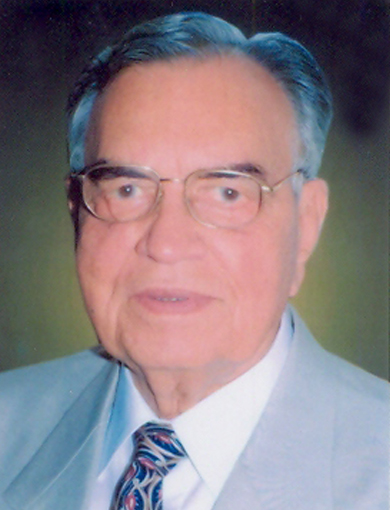
| | First party | Second party | Third party |
|---|---|---|---|
| Leader | Parkash Singh Badal | Balram Das Tandon | Balram Jakhar |
| Party | SAD | JP | INC |
| Alliance | SAD + JP | SAD + JP |
| Leader's seat | Gidderbaha | Amritsar Central | Abohar |
| Last election | 24 | New party | 66 |
| Seats won | 58 | 25 | 17 |
| Seat change | ▲34 | New | ▼49 |
| Popular vote | 1,776,602 | 847,718 | 1,899,534 |
| Percentage | 31.41 | 14.99 | 33.59 |
| Swing | ▲3.8% | New | ▼9.3% |
Chief Minister before election
President's rule
Elected Chief Minister
Parkash Singh Badal
SAD.

Legislative Assembly elections were held in the Indian state of Punjab in 1977. The result was a victory for Shiromani Akali Dal, which won 58 of the 117 seats.

== Result ==
| Party | Seats contested | Seats won | Change in seats | Popular Vote | % |
|---|---|---|---|---|---|
| Shiromani Akali Dal | 70 | 58 | ▲34 | 17,76,602 | 31.41% |
| Janata Party | 41 | 25 | (new) | 8,47,718 | 14.99% |
| Indian National Congress | 96 | 17 | ▼49 | 18,99,534 | 33.59% |
| Communist Party of India (Marxist) | 8 | 8 | ▲7 | 1,98,144 | 3.50% |
| Communist Party of India | 18 | 7 | ▼3 | 3,72,711 | 6.59% |
| Independents | 435 | 2 | ▼1 | 5,41,958 | 9.58% |
| Others | 14 | 0 | - | 18,686 | 0.33% |
| Total | 682 | 117 | | 56,55,353 | |

== Constituency wise results ==
| # | AC Name | AC No. | Type | Winning Candidate | Party | Total Electors | Total Votes | Poll% | Margin | Margin % |
|---|---|---|---|---|---|---|---|---|---|---|
| 1 | Fatehgarh | 1 | GEN | Dr Jodh Singh | Shiromani Akali Dal | 74,591 | 51,574 | 69.1 % | 648 | 1.3% |
| 2 | Batala | 2 | GEN | Panna Lal Nayyar | Janta Party | 78,028 | 54,763 | 70.2 % | 3,192 | 5.8% |
| 3 | Qadian | 3 | GEN | Mohinder Singh | Shiromani Akali Dal | 84,558 | 55,200 | 65.3 % | 9,367 | 17.0% |
| 4 | Srihargobindpur | 4 | GEN | Natha Singh | Shiromani Akali Dal | 66,348 | 42,242 | 63.7 % | 5,003 | 11.8% |
| 5 | Kahnuwan | 5 | GEN | Ujagar Singh | Shiromani Akali Dal | 66,729 | 45,449 | 68.1 % | 3,961 | 8.7% |
| 6 | Dhariwal | 6 | GEN | Swaran Singh | Shiromani Akali Dal | 69,219 | 47,045 | 68.0 % | 1,666 | 3.5% |
| 7 | Gurdaspur | 7 | GEN | Khushhal Bahl | Indian National Congress | 76,676 | 53,659 | 70.0 % | 1,053 | 2.0% |
| 8 | Dina Nagar | 8 | SC | Gian Chand | Janta Party | 73,134 | 47,230 | 64.6 % | 2,090 | 4.4% |
| 9 | Narot Mehra | 9 | SC | Sunder Singh | Indian National Congress | 60,618 | 41,536 | 68.5 % | 2,230 | 5.4% |
| 10 | Pathankot | 10 | GEN | Om Parkash Bhardwaj | Janta Party | 66,569 | 44,104 | 66.3 % | 2,486 | 5.6% |
| 11 | Sujanpur | 11 | GEN | Chaman Lal | Indian National Congress | 59,313 | 42,768 | 72.1 % | 4,770 | 11.2% |
| 12 | Beas | 12 | GEN | Jiwan Singh Umara Nangal | Shiromani Akali Dal | 83,636 | 52,209 | 62.4 % | 9,954 | 19.1% |
| 13 | Majitha | 13 | GEN | Parkash Singh | Shiromani Akali Dal | 81,115 | 56,146 | 69.2 % | 4,437 | 7.9% |
| 14 | Verka | 14 | SC | Khajan Singh | Shiromani Akali Dal | 80,757 | 47,199 | 58.4 % | 950 | 2.0% |
| 15 | Jandiala | 15 | SC | Dalbir Singh | Shiromani Akali Dal | 75,682 | 41,525 | 54.9 % | 1,535 | 3.7% |
| 16 | Amritsar North | 16 | GEN | Harbans Lal Khanna | Janta Party | 90,040 | 53,444 | 59.4 % | 4,770 | 8.9% |
| 17 | Amritsar West | 17 | GEN | Satya Pal Dang | Communist Party Of India | 95,048 | 54,082 | 56.9 % | 18,912 | 35.0% |
| 18 | Amritsar Central | 18 | GEN | Balramjidass Tandan | Janta Party | 74,064 | 52,313 | 70.6 % | 2,626 | 5.0% |
| 19 | Amritsar South | 19 | GEN | Kirpal Singh | Janta Party | 87,705 | 54,841 | 62.5 % | 11,929 | 21.8% |
| 20 | Ajnala | 20 | GEN | Shashpal Singh | Shiromani Akali Dal | 81,446 | 57,816 | 71.0 % | 2,036 | 3.5% |
| 21 | Raja Sansi | 21 | GEN | Dalip Singh Tapiala | Communist Party Of India (MARXIST) | 71,441 | 45,603 | 63.8 % | 8,332 | 18.3% |
| 22 | Attari | 22 | SC | Darshan Singh | Communist Party Of India (MARXIST) | 65,680 | 32,112 | 48.9 % | 4,673 | 14.6% |
| 23 | Tarn Taran | 23 | GEN | Manjinder Singh Behla | Independent | 77,603 | 51,350 | 66.2 % | 1,069 | 2.1% |
| 24 | Khadoor Sahib | 24 | SC | Naranjan Singh | Shiromani Akali Dal | 74,117 | 34,799 | 47.0 % | 5,095 | 14.6% |
| 25 | Naushahra Panwan | 25 | GEN | Ranjit Singh | Shiromani Akali Dal | 71,694 | 48,258 | 67.3 % | 844 | 1.7% |
| 26 | Patti | 26 | GEN | Niranjan Singh | Shiromani Akali Dal | 82,127 | 45,569 | 55.5 % | 5,451 | 12.0% |
| 27 | Valtoha | 27 | GEN | Jagir Singh | Shiromani Akali Dal | 78,608 | 45,362 | 57.7 % | 8,085 | 17.8% |
| 28 | Adampur | 28 | GEN | Sarup Singh | Janta Party | 75,919 | 50,374 | 66.4 % | 4,098 | 8.1% |
| 29 | Jullundur Cantonment | 29 | GEN | Harbhajan Singh | Janta Party | 67,644 | 43,477 | 64.3 % | 1,355 | 3.1% |
| 30 | Jullundur North | 30 | GEN | Ramesh Chander | Janta Party | 74,506 | 50,451 | 67.7 % | 3,149 | 6.2% |
| 31 | Jullundur Central | 31 | GEN | Man Mohan Kalia | Janta Party | 73,380 | 43,136 | 58.8 % | 10,439 | 24.2% |
| 32 | Jullundur South | 32 | SC | Darshan Singh | Indian National Congress | 61,497 | 40,126 | 65.2 % | 12,387 | 30.9% |
| 33 | Kartarpur | 33 | SC | Bhagat Singh | Shiromani Akali Dal | 73,727 | 51,040 | 69.2 % | 1,759 | 3.4% |
| 34 | Lohian | 34 | GEN | Balwant Singh | Shiromani Akali Dal | 84,947 | 56,033 | 66.0 % | 11,160 | 19.9% |
| 35 | Nakodar | 35 | GEN | Umrao Singh | Indian National Congress | 79,904 | 54,564 | 68.3 % | 1,275 | 2.3% |
| 36 | Nur Mahal | 36 | GEN | Sarwon Singh | Communist Party Of India (MARXIST) | 79,880 | 55,308 | 69.2 % | 8,767 | 15.9% |
| 37 | Banga | 37 | SC | Harbans Singh | Communist Party Of India (MARXIST) | 75,673 | 51,188 | 67.6 % | 1,612 | 3.1% |
| 38 | Nawan Shahr | 38 | GEN | Jatinder Singh | Shiromani Akali Dal | 98,294 | 70,727 | 72.0 % | 3,635 | 5.1% |
| 39 | Phillaur | 39 | SC | Sarwan Singh | Shiromani Akali Dal | 78,210 | 49,309 | 63.0 % | 5,920 | 12.0% |
| 40 | Bholath | 40 | GEN | Sukhjinder Singh | Shiromani Akali Dal | 66,850 | 47,707 | 71.4 % | 13,146 | 27.6% |
| 41 | Kapurthala | 41 | GEN | Hukam Chand | Janta Party | 60,235 | 37,902 | 62.9 % | 3,209 | 8.5% |
| 42 | Sultanpur | 42 | GEN | Atma Singh | Shiromani Akali Dal | 64,522 | 41,445 | 64.2 % | 14,190 | 34.2% |
| 43 | Phagwara | 43 | SC | Sadhu Ram | Janta Party | 79,263 | 50,427 | 63.6 % | 4,710 | 9.3% |
| 44 | Balachaur | 44 | GEN | Ram Kishan | Janta Party | 73,591 | 47,265 | 64.2 % | 685 | 1.4% |
| 45 | Garhshankar | 45 | GEN | Darshan Singh | Communist Party Of India | 72,946 | 41,597 | 57.0 % | 1,123 | 2.7% |
| 46 | Mahilpur | 46 | SC | Kartar Singh | Shiromani Akali Dal | 68,411 | 40,684 | 59.5 % | 10,372 | 25.5% |
| 47 | Hoshiarpur | 47 | GEN | Om Parkash | Janta Party | 73,802 | 46,736 | 63.3 % | 943 | 2.0% |
| 48 | Sham Chaurasi | 48 | SC | Dev Raj Nasrala | Communist Party Of India (MARXIST) | 72,499 | 43,325 | 59.8 % | 6,145 | 14.2% |
| 49 | Tanda | 49 | GEN | Upkar Singh | Shiromani Akali Dal | 74,800 | 50,797 | 67.9 % | 7,217 | 14.2% |
| 50 | Garhdiwala | 50 | SC | Dharam Paul | Janta Party | 72,468 | 41,496 | 57.3 % | 5,974 | 14.4% |
| 51 | Dasuya | 51 | GEN | Gurbachan Singh | Indian National Congress | 73,003 | 43,774 | 60.0 % | 1,607 | 3.7% |
| 52 | Mukerian | 52 | GEN | Kewal Krishna | Indian National Congress | 73,682 | 52,985 | 71.9 % | 5,713 | 10.8% |
| 53 | Jagraon | 53 | GEN | Dalip Singh | Shiromani Akali Dal | 88,956 | 58,993 | 66.3 % | 156 | 0.3% |
| 54 | Raikot | 54 | GEN | Dev Raj Singh | Shiromani Akali Dal | 80,543 | 52,772 | 65.5 % | 4,138 | 7.8% |
| 55 | Dakha | 55 | SC | Charanjit Singh | Shiromani Akali Dal | 91,530 | 53,457 | 58.4 % | 11,730 | 21.9% |
| 56 | Qila Raipur | 56 | GEN | Arjan Singh | Shiromani Akali Dal | 86,949 | 51,857 | 59.6 % | 6,340 | 12.2% |
| 57 | Ludhiana North | 57 | GEN | Kapoor Chand | Janta Party | 79,766 | 55,918 | 70.1 % | 2,702 | 4.8% |
| 58 | Ludhiana West | 58 | GEN | A. Vishwanathan | Janta Party | 74,113 | 47,565 | 64.2 % | 5,048 | 10.6% |
| 59 | Ludhiana East | 59 | GEN | Om Parkash Gupta | Indian National Congress | 69,368 | 48,628 | 70.1 % | 1,029 | 2.1% |
| 60 | Ludhiana Rural | 60 | GEN | Dhanraj Singh | Shiromani Akali Dal | 84,494 | 52,095 | 61.7 % | 3,744 | 7.2% |
| 61 | Payal | 61 | GEN | Benat Singh | Indian National Congress | 80,188 | 57,339 | 71.5 % | 5,260 | 9.2% |
| 62 | Kum Kalan | 62 | SC | Daya Singh | Communist Party Of India (MARXIST) | 78,413 | 48,158 | 61.4 % | 4,211 | 8.7% |
| 63 | Samrala | 63 | GEN | Prehlad Singh | Shiromani Akali Dal | 73,399 | 48,130 | 65.6 % | 6,626 | 13.8% |
| 64 | Khanna | 64 | SC | Bachan Singh | Shiromani Akali Dal | 74,391 | 50,690 | 68.1 % | 893 | 1.8% |
| 65 | Nangal | 65 | GEN | Madan Mohan | Janta Party | 70,130 | 46,205 | 65.9 % | 3,607 | 7.8% |
| 66 | Anandpur Sahib - Ropar | 66 | GEN | Madho Singh | Janta Party | 76,815 | 44,539 | 58.0 % | 4,000 | 9.0% |
| 67 | Chamkaur Sahib | 67 | SC | Satwant Kaur | Shiromani Akali Dal | 68,948 | 47,119 | 68.3 % | 11,760 | 25.0% |
| 68 | Morinda | 68 | GEN | Ravi Inder Singh | Shiromani Akali Dal | 77,775 | 53,275 | 68.5 % | 8,249 | 15.5% |
| 69 | Kharar | 69 | GEN | Bachittar Singh | Shiromani Akali Dal | 67,816 | 44,616 | 65.8 % | 8,928 | 20.0% |
| 70 | Banur | 70 | GEN | Hans Raj Sharma | Indian National Congress | 74,724 | 52,035 | 69.6 % | 3,955 | 7.6% |
| 71 | Rajpura | 71 | GEN | Harbans Lal | Janta Party | 70,732 | 46,491 | 65.7 % | 12,995 | 28.0% |
| 72 | Ghanaur | 72 | GEN | Jasdev Kaur Sandhu | Shiromani Akali Dal | 67,661 | 43,555 | 64.4 % | 5,395 | 12.4% |
| 73 | Dakala | 73 | GEN | Lal Singh | Indian National Congress | 77,889 | 50,652 | 65.0 % | 605 | 1.2% |
| 74 | Shutrana | 74 | SC | Baldev Singh | Communist Party Of India | 76,479 | 47,858 | 62.6 % | 135 | 0.3% |
| 75 | Samana | 75 | GEN | Gurdev Singh | Shiromani Akali Dal | 82,953 | 48,814 | 58.8 % | 6,080 | 12.5% |
| 76 | Patiala Town | 76 | GEN | Sardar Singh | Shiromani Akali Dal | 72,423 | 45,499 | 62.8 % | 243 | 0.5% |
| 77 | Nabha | 77 | GEN | Gurdarshan Singh | Indian National Congress | 83,180 | 65,365 | 78.6 % | 5,820 | 8.9% |
| 78 | Amloh | 78 | SC | Dalip Singh Pandhi | Shiromani Akali Dal | 84,063 | 56,348 | 67.0 % | 12,351 | 21.9% |
| 79 | Sirhind | 79 | GEN | Randhir Singh | Shiromani Akali Dal | 84,323 | 58,994 | 70.0 % | 2,858 | 4.8% |
| 80 | Dhuri | 80 | GEN | Sant Singh | Shiromani Akali Dal | 77,164 | 53,379 | 69.2 % | 9,352 | 17.5% |
| 81 | Malerkotla | 81 | GEN | Anwar Ahmad Khan | Shiromani Akali Dal | 83,057 | 63,235 | 76.1 % | 5,685 | 9.0% |
| 82 | Sherpur | 82 | SC | Chand Singh | Communist Party Of India (MARXIST) | 71,938 | 42,861 | 59.6 % | 13,155 | 30.7% |
| 83 | Barnala | 83 | GEN | Surjit Kaur | Shiromani Akali Dal | 68,262 | 48,720 | 71.4 % | 7,855 | 16.1% |
| 84 | Bhadaur | 84 | SC | Kundan Singh | Shiromani Akali Dal | 71,042 | 43,294 | 60.9 % | 8,693 | 20.1% |
| 85 | Dhanaula | 85 | GEN | Sampuran Singh | Communist Party Of India (MARXIST) | 67,308 | 49,413 | 73.4 % | 2,907 | 5.9% |
| 86 | Sangrur | 86 | GEN | Gurdial Singh | Janta Party | 69,053 | 47,084 | 68.2 % | 2,796 | 5.9% |
| 87 | Dirbha | 87 | GEN | Baldev Singh | Shiromani Akali Dal | 69,513 | 43,712 | 62.9 % | 10,018 | 22.9% |
| 88 | Sunam | 88 | GEN | Sukhdev Singh | Shiromani Akali Dal | 70,036 | 48,761 | 69.6 % | 10,448 | 21.4% |
| 89 | Lehra | 89 | GEN | Chitwant Singh | Independent | 68,528 | 46,999 | 68.6 % | 2,930 | 6.2% |
| 90 | Balluana | 90 | SC | Ujagar Singh S/o Nadar Singh | Indian National Congress | 75,209 | 42,246 | 56.2 % | 2,514 | 6.0% |
| 91 | Abohar | 91 | GEN | Bal Ram | Indian National Congress | 73,867 | 50,467 | 68.3 % | 8,459 | 16.8% |
| 92 | Fazilka | 92 | GEN | Kanshi Ram | Indian National Congress | 67,248 | 44,757 | 66.6 % | 3,484 | 7.8% |
| 93 | Jalalabad | 93 | GEN | Mehtab Singh | Communist Party Of India | 76,852 | 48,665 | 63.3 % | 17,795 | 36.6% |
| 94 | Guru Har Sahai | 94 | GEN | Lachhman Singh | Indian National Congress | 76,437 | 52,042 | 68.1 % | 7,406 | 14.2% |
| 95 | Firozepur | 95 | GEN | Gardhara Singh | Janta Party | 70,662 | 45,466 | 64.3 % | 234 | 0.5% |
| 96 | Firozepur Cantonment | 96 | GEN | Harpreet Singh | Shiromani Akali Dal | 67,085 | 45,740 | 68.2 % | 4,835 | 10.6% |
| 97 | Zira | 97 | GEN | Hari Singh | Shiromani Akali Dal | 72,851 | 46,799 | 64.2 % | 9,256 | 19.8% |
| 98 | Dharamkot | 98 | SC | Sarwan Singh | Communist Party Of India | 73,667 | 41,525 | 56.4 % | 981 | 2.4% |
| 99 | Moga | 99 | GEN | Rup Lal | Janta Party | 77,790 | 52,050 | 66.9 % | 5,996 | 11.5% |
| 100 | Bagha Purana | 100 | GEN | Tej Singh | Shiromani Akali Dal | 76,630 | 55,703 | 72.7 % | 6,889 | 12.4% |
| 101 | Nihal Singh Wala | 101 | SC | Gurdev Singh | Shiromani Akali Dal | 70,275 | 51,601 | 73.4 % | 2,539 | 4.9% |
| 102 | Panjgrain | 102 | SC | Gurdev Singh | Shiromani Akali Dal | 76,800 | 41,548 | 54.1 % | 18,069 | 43.5% |
| 103 | Kot Kapura | 103 | GEN | Jaswinder Singh | Shiromani Akali Dal | 84,099 | 51,795 | 61.6 % | 21,683 | 41.9% |
| 104 | Faridkot | 104 | GEN | Manmohan Singh | Shiromani Akali Dal | 80,549 | 54,411 | 67.6 % | 10,642 | 19.6% |
| 105 | Muktsar | 105 | GEN | Kanwarjit Singh | Indian National Congress | 76,359 | 54,968 | 72.0 % | 1,004 | 1.8% |
| 106 | Giddar Baha | 106 | GEN | Parkash Singh | Shiromani Akali Dal | 78,217 | 55,970 | 71.6 % | 14,163 | 25.3% |
| 107 | Malout | 107 | SC | Daua Ram | Communist Party Of India | 71,492 | 46,588 | 65.2 % | 2,053 | 4.4% |
| 108 | Lambi | 108 | GEN | Gurdas Singh | Shiromani Akali Dal | 77,914 | 50,924 | 65.4 % | 9,280 | 18.2% |
| 109 | Talwandi Sabo | 109 | GEN | Sukhdev Singh | Shiromani Akali Dal | 61,339 | 46,019 | 75.0 % | 5,363 | 11.7% |
| 110 | Pakka Kalan | 110 | SC | Sukhdev Singh | Shiromani Akali Dal | 69,989 | 44,494 | 63.6 % | 6,068 | 13.6% |
| 111 | Bhatinda | 111 | GEN | Hitabhilashi | Janta Party | 79,417 | 50,950 | 64.2 % | 3,418 | 6.7% |
| 112 | Nathana | 112 | SC | Teja Singh | Shiromani Akali Dal | 71,110 | 41,631 | 58.5 % | 12,225 | 29.4% |
| 113 | Rampura Phul | 113 | GEN | Babu Singh | Communist Party Of India | 71,492 | 54,481 | 76.2 % | 2,331 | 4.3% |
| 114 | Joga | 114 | GEN | Baldev Singh | Shiromani Akali Dal | 68,297 | 51,637 | 75.6 % | 7,051 | 13.7% |
| 115 | Mansa | 115 | GEN | Des Raj | Janta Party | 73,119 | 48,987 | 67.0 % | 3,275 | 6.7% |
| 116 | Budhlada | 116 | GEN | Tara Singh | Shiromani Akali Dal | 71,098 | 49,349 | 69.4 % | 4,949 | 10.0% |
| 117 | Sardulgarh | 117 | GEN | Balwinder Singh | Shiromani Akali Dal | 64,995 | 44,115 | 67.9 % | 15,715 | 35.6% |

== Bypolls ==
| # | AC Name | No | Type | State | Winning Candidate | Party |
|---|---|---|---|---|---|---|
| 1 | Ferozepur Cantt. | 96 | NA | Punjab | M.Singh | SAD |

== See also ==
- Seventh Punjab Legislative Assembly
- Elections in Punjab
