= Sewa Singh Sekhwan =

Indian politician (1950–2021)

Education minister
- Constituency: Kahnuwan

Personal details
- Born: April 10, 1950 Gurdaspur, Punjab, India
- Died: October 6, 2021 (aged 71) Mohali, Punjab, India
- Spouse: Amarjit Kaur (m. 1977)
- Children: 4
- Website: sewasinghsekhwan.com

Sewa Singh Sekhwan (Punjabi:ਸੇਵਾ ਸਿੰਘ ਸੇਖਵਾਂ; 10 April 1950 – 6 October 2021) was an Indian Politician and a member of Aam Aadami Party. He was one of the founding members of Shiromani Akali Dal (Taksali). He was the Education minister of Punjab under the ten-year government of Shiromani Akali Dal. He was sworn in as a cabinet minister for the second time on 26 October 2009. Sekhwan's father Ujagar Singh Sekhwan was MLA from Kahnuwan in 1977 and 1980. He was founder of a group supporting Indian minorities and Dalits front. He remained the president of Akali Dal during the Emergency in India.

Sekhwan worked as a teacher for 14 years before entering politics after his father's death in 1990. Punjab chief minister Parkash Singh Badal, then SAD president encouraged him to follow his father and supported him to run for Kahnuwan assembly in Gurdaspur District. He was elected MLA in 1997 from Kahnuwan. He was made Revenue, Rehabilitation and Public Relations, Minister in the Badal government.

Sekhwan was a member of SGPC, the supreme Sikh body. Sekhwan also remained Technical Education Minister.

He had quit Shiromani Akali Dal and formed the Shiromani Akali Dal (Taksali) party with other politicians who quit Shiromani Akali Dal such as Ranjit Singh Brahmpura, Rattan Singh Ajnala, Parminder Singh Dhindsa, Sukhdev Singh Dhindsa and Harsukhinder Singh Bubby Badal. Sekhwan joined the Aam Aadmi Party in August 2021.

Sekhwan died on 6 October 2021 at the age of 71 due to liver infection.
