= Jiwan Singh Sangowal =

Indian politician

MLA, Punjab Legislative Assembly
- Incumbent
- Assumed office 2022
- Preceded by: Kuldeep Singh Vaid
- Constituency: Gill
- Majority: Aam Aadmi Party

Personal details
- Citizenship: Indian
- Party: Aam Aadmi Party
- Profession: Typewriter Typist
- Nickname: Jeevan, Sangowal saab

Jiwan Singh Sangowal is an Indian politician and the MLA representing the Gill Assembly constituency in the Punjab Legislative Assembly. He is a member of the Aam Aadmi Party. He was elected as the MLA in the 2022 Punjab Legislative Assembly election.

== Member of Legislative Assembly ==
He represents the Gill Assembly constituency as MLA in Punjab Assembly. The Aam Aadmi Party gained a strong 79% majority in the sixteenth Punjab Legislative Assembly by winning 92 out of 117 seats in the 2022 Punjab Legislative Assembly election. MP Bhagwant Mann was sworn in as Chief Minister on 16 March 2022.

Committee assignments of Punjab Legislative Assembly

- Member (2022–23) Committee on Welfare of Scheduled Castes, Scheduled Tribes and Backward Classes
- Member (2022–23) Committee on Government Assurances

== Electoral performance ==
Punjab Assembly election, 2022: Gill
Party	Candidate	Votes	%	±%
AAP	Jiwan Singh Sangowal	92,696	50.33	
SAD	Darshan Singh	35,052	19.03	
INC	Kuldeep Singh Vaid	33,786	18.35	
BJP	Sucha Ram Ladhar	12,801	6.95	New
LIP	Gagandeep Kainth	3,837	2.08	
Independent	Rajeev Kumar Lovely	2,013	1.09	
NOTA	None of the above	1,701	0.92	
Majority		57,644	31.3	
Registered electors		273,104		

State Legislative Assembly
Preceded by -	Member of the Punjab Legislative Assembly from Gill Assembly constituency 2022 –	Incumbent
