= 2027 Punjab Legislative Assembly election =

Elections for the 17th Legislative assembly of Punjab

- By February 2027

All 117 elected seats in the Punjab Legislative Assembly 59 seats needed for a majority
- Opinion polls
- Registered: 20,100,727 (▼6.51%)
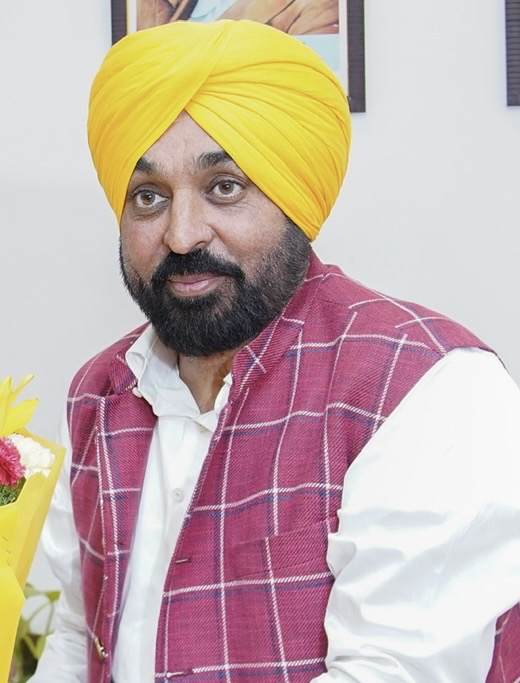

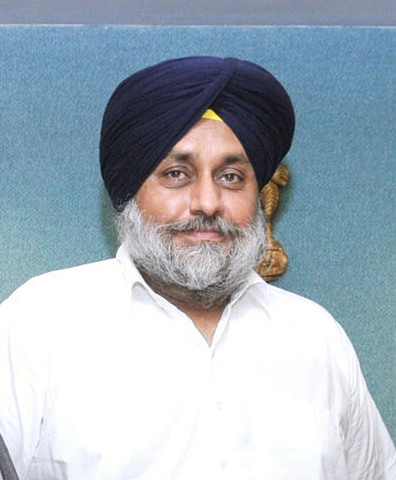

| Leader | Bhagwant Mann | Pargat Singh |
| Party | AAP | INC |
| Leader since | 2022 | 2026 |
| Leader's seat | Dhuri | Jalandhar Cantonment |
| Last election | 42.01%, 92 seats | 22.98%, 18 seats |
| Current seats | 94 | 16 |
| Seats needed | Steady | ▲43 |
| Leader | Sukhbir Singh Badal | Kewal Singh Dhillon |
| Party | SAD | BJP |
| Leader since | 2019 | 2026 |
| Leader's seat | Gidderbaha | Not announced |
| Last election | 18.38%, 3 seats | 6.6%, 2 seats |
| Current seats | 2 | 2 |
| Seats needed | ▲57 | ▲57 |
- Map of the assembly constituencies in Punjab
Incumbent Chief Minister
Bhagwant Mann
AAP

Legislative assembly elections are expected to be held in Punjab in February 2027 to elect all 117 members of the Punjab Legislative Assembly. Bhagwant Mann is the incumbent Chief Minister of Punjab.

== Election schedule ==
| Poll event | Schedule |
|---|---|
| Notification | TBD |
| Last date for filing nomination | TBD |
| Scrutiny of nominations | TBD |
| Last date for withdrawal of nomination | TBD |
| Polling | TBD |
| Counting of votes | TBD |

== Voter statistics ==
Final electoral roll after Special Intensive Revision by the ECI was published on October 12, 2026.

| Male voters | Female voters | Transgender voters | Total voters |
|---|---|---|---|
| 10,376,026 | 9,724,195 | 506 | 20,100,727 |

| S.No. | Types | Voters |
|---|---|---|
| 1 | General voters | |
| 2 | People with disabilities | |
| 3 | Service voters | |
| 4 | Non-resident Indian voters | |
| 5 | Voters above the age of 80 | |
| 6 | Total | |

== Parties and Alliances ==
| Party | Flag | Symbol | Leader | Seats contested |
|---|---|---|---|---|
| Aam Aadmi Party | | | Bhagwant Mann | 71 declared |
| Indian National Congress | | | Pargat Singh | TBD |
| Shiromani Akali Dal | | | Sukhbir Singh Badal | TBD |
| Bharatiya Janata Party | | | Kewal Singh Dhillon | TBD |
| Akali Dal (Waris Punjab De) | | | Amritpal Singh | 2 declared |
| Shiromani Akali Dal (Amritsar) | | | Simranjit Singh Mann | 20 declared |
| Bahujan Samaj Party | | | Avtar Singh Karimpuri | TBD |
| Shiromani Akali Dal (Punar Surjit) | | | Giani Harpreet Singh | TBD |
| Communist Party of India (Marxist) | | | Sukhwinder Singh Sekhon | TBD |
| Communist Party of India | | | Bant Singh Brar | TBD |
| Bharatiya Rashtrawadi Party | | | Navjot Kaur Sidhu | TBD |
| Punjab Sanjhiwalta Dal | | | Amitoj Maan | TBD |

== Candidates ==
- Shiromani Akali Dal (Amritsar) announced its first list of 20 candidates for the 2027 Punjab Assembly Elections
- Aam Aadmi Party announced its first list of 40 candidates for the 2027 Punjab Assembly Elections on 31 October 2026, second list of 31 candidates on 12 November 2026

| District | Constituency | | | | | | | | |
| District | Constituency | | AAP | | INC | SAD | | BJP | |
| Pathankot | 1 | Sujanpur | AAP | Swaran Salaria | INC | SAD | | BJP | |
| Pathankot | 2 | Bhoa (SC) | AAP | | INC | SAD | | BJP | |
| Pathankot | 3 | Pathankot | AAP | Rohit Syal | INC | SAD | | BJP | |
| Gurdaspur | 4 | Gurdaspur | AAP | Raman Bahl | INC | SAD | | BJP | |
| Gurdaspur | 5 | Dina Nagar (SC) | AAP | Shamsher Singh | INC | SAD | | BJP | |
| Gurdaspur | 6 | Qadian | AAP | Guriqbal Singh Mahal | INC | SAD | | BJP | |
| Gurdaspur | 7 | Batala | AAP | Amansher Singh Sherry Kalsi | INC | SAD | | BJP | |
| Gurdaspur | 8 | Sri Hargobindpur (SC) | AAP | | INC | SAD | | BJP | |
| Gurdaspur | 9 | Fatehgarh Churian | AAP | Harjobanjit Singh Randhawa | INC | SAD | | BJP | |
| Gurdaspur | 10 | Dera Baba Nanak | AAP | | INC | SAD | | BJP | |
| Amritsar | 11 | Ajnala | AAP | Kuldeep Singh Dhaliwal | INC | SAD | | BJP | |
| Amritsar | 12 | Rajasansi | AAP | Sonia Mann | INC | SAD | | BJP | |
| Amritsar | 13 | Majitha | AAP | Talbir Singh Gill | INC | SAD | | BJP | |
| Amritsar | 14 | Jandiala (SC) | AAP | | INC | SAD | | BJP | |
| Amritsar | 15 | Amritsar North | AAP | Karamjit Singh Rintu | INC | SAD | | BJP | Kunwar Vijay Pratap Singh |
| Amritsar | 16 | Amritsar West (SC) | AAP | | INC | SAD | | BJP | |
| Amritsar | 17 | Amritsar Central | AAP | | INC | SAD | | BJP | |
| Amritsar | 18 | Amritsar East | AAP | | INC | SAD | | BJP | |
| Amritsar | 19 | Amritsar South | AAP | Inderbir Singh Nijjar | INC | SAD | | BJP | |
| Amritsar | 20 | Attari (SC) | AAP | | INC | SAD | | BJP | |
| Tarn Taran | 21 | Tarn Taran | AAP | Harmeet Singh Sandhu | INC | SAD | | BJP | |
| Tarn Taran | 22 | Khemkaran | AAP | Sarvan Singh Dhun | INC | SAD | | BJP | |
| Tarn Taran | 23 | Patti | AAP | Jaskanwar Singh Gill | INC | SAD | | BJP | |
| Tarn Taran | 24 | Khadoor Sahib | AAP | | INC | SAD | | BJP | |
| Amritsar | 25 | Baba Bakala (SC) | AAP | | INC | SAD | | BJP | |
| Kapurthala | 26 | Bholath | AAP | Harsimran Singh | INC | SAD | | BJP | |
| Kapurthala | 27 | Kapurthala | AAP | Davinder Pal Singh Ranga | INC | SAD | | BJP | |
| Kapurthala | 28 | Sultanpur Lodhi | AAP | | INC | SAD | | BJP | |
| Kapurthala | 29 | Phagwara (SC) | AAP | Raj Kumar Chabbewal | INC | SAD | | BJP | |
| Jalandhar | 30 | Phillaur (SC) | AAP | Harjot Kaur Lohtia | INC | SAD | | BJP | |
| Jalandhar | 31 | Nakodar | AAP | Inderjit Kaur Mann | INC | SAD | | BJP | |
| Jalandhar | 32 | Shahkot | AAP | Balvir Singh Pala Jalalpur | INC | SAD | | BJP | |
| Jalandhar | 33 | Kartarpur (SC) | AAP | Balkar Singh | INC | SAD | | BJP | |
| Jalandhar | 34 | Jalandhar West (SC) | AAP | | INC | SAD | | BJP | |
| Jalandhar | 35 | Jalandhar Central | AAP | Nitin Kohli | INC | SAD | | BJP | |
| Jalandhar | 36 | Jalandhar North | AAP | Vaneet Dhir | INC | SAD | | BJP | |
| Jalandhar | 37 | Jalandhar Cantonment | AAP | Deepak Bali | INC | SAD | | BJP | |
| Jalandhar | 38 | Adampur (SC) | AAP | Pawan Kumar Tinu | INC | SAD | | BJP | |
| Hoshiarpur | 39 | Mukerian | AAP | Sarabjot Singh Saabi | INC | SAD | | BJP | |
| Hoshiarpur | 40 | Dasuya | AAP | Karambir Singh Ghuman | INC | SAD | | BJP | |
| Hoshiarpur | 41 | Urmar | AAP | Jasvir Singh Raja Gill | INC | SAD | | BJP | |
| Hoshiarpur | 42 | Sham Chaurasi (SC) | AAP | | INC | SAD | | BJP | |
| Hoshiarpur | 43 | Hoshiarpur | AAP | Brahm Shankar Jimpa | INC | SAD | | BJP | |
| Hoshiarpur | 44 | Chabbewal (SC) | AAP | Ishank Chabbewal | INC | SAD | | BJP | |
| Hoshiarpur | 45 | Garhshankar | AAP | Jai Krishan Singh | INC | SAD | | BJP | |
| S.B.S Nagar | 46 | Banga (SC) | AAP | | INC | SAD | | BJP | |
| S.B.S Nagar | 47 | Nawan Shahr | AAP | Robby Kang | INC | SAD | | BJP | |
| S.B.S Nagar | 48 | Balachaur | AAP | Santosh Kataria | INC | SAD | | BJP | |
| Rupnagar | 49 | Anandpur Sahib | AAP | | INC | SAD | | BJP | |
| Rupnagar | 50 | Rupnagar | AAP | Dinesh Chadha | INC | SAD | | BJP | |
| Rupnagar | 51 | Chamkaur Sahib (SC) | AAP | Jasvir Singh Garhi | INC | SAD | | BJP | |
| S.A.S Nagar | 52 | Kharar | AAP | Parminder Singh Goldy | INC | SAD | | BJP | |
| S.A.S Nagar | 53 | S.A.S. Nagar | AAP | Kulwant Singh | INC | SAD | | BJP | |
| Fatehgarh Sahib | 54 | Bassi Pathana (SC) | AAP | | INC | SAD | | BJP | |
| Fatehgarh Sahib | 55 | Fatehgarh Sahib | AAP | Lakhbir Singh Rai | INC | SAD | | BJP | |
| Fatehgarh Sahib | 56 | Amloh | AAP | Gurinder Singh Garry | INC | SAD | | BJP | |
| Ludhiana | 57 | Khanna | AAP | | INC | SAD | | BJP | |
| Ludhiana | 58 | Samrala | AAP | Jagtar Singh | INC | SAD | | BJP | |
| Ludhiana | 59 | Sahnewal | AAP | | INC | SAD | | BJP | |
| Ludhiana | 60 | Ludhiana East | AAP | Daljit Singh Grewal | INC | SAD | | BJP | |
| Ludhiana | 61 | Ludhiana South | AAP | | INC | SAD | | BJP | |
| Ludhiana | 62 | Atam Nagar | AAP | Kulwant Singh Sidhu | INC | SAD | | BJP | |
| Ludhiana | 63 | Ludhiana Central | AAP | Ashok Parashar Pappi | INC | SAD | | BJP | |
| Ludhiana | 64 | Ludhiana West | AAP | Sanjeev Arora | INC | SAD | | BJP | |
| Ludhiana | 65 | Ludhiana North | AAP | Madan Lal Bagga | INC | SAD | | BJP | |
| Ludhiana | 66 | Gill (SC) | AAP | | INC | SAD | | BJP | |
| Ludhiana | 67 | Payal (SC) | AAP | Manwinder Singh Giaspura | INC | SAD | | BJP | |
| Ludhiana | 68 | Dakha | AAP | K. N. S. Kang | INC | SAD | | BJP | |
| Ludhiana | 69 | Raikot (SC) | AAP | | INC | SAD | | BJP | |
| Ludhiana | 70 | Jagraon (SC) | AAP | Saravjit Kaur Manuke | INC | SAD | | BJP | |
| Moga | 71 | Nihal Singh Wala (SC) | AAP | Manjit Singh Bilaspur | INC | SAD | | BJP | |
| Moga | 72 | Bhagha Purana | AAP | Amritpal Singh Sukhanand | INC | SAD | | BJP | |
| Moga | 73 | Moga | AAP | Amandeep Kaur Arora | INC | SAD | | BJP | |
| Moga | 74 | Dharamkot | AAP | Devinderjeet Singh | INC | SAD | | BJP | |
| Firozpur | 75 | Zira | AAP | | INC | SAD | | BJP | |
| Firozpur | 76 | Firozpur City | AAP | | INC | SAD | | BJP | |
| Firozpur | 77 | Firozpur Rural (SC) | AAP | | INC | SAD | | BJP | |
| Firozpur | 78 | Guru Har Sahai | AAP | | INC | SAD | | BJP | |
| Fazilka | 79 | Jalalabad | AAP | Jagdeep Kamboj Goldy | INC | SAD | | BJP | |
| Fazilka | 80 | Fazilka | AAP | Narinder Pal Singh Sawna | INC | SAD | | BJP | |
| Fazilka | 81 | Abohar | AAP | Suhani Doda | INC | SAD | | BJP | |
| Fazilka | 82 | Balluana (SC) | AAP | Amandeep Singh Musafir | INC | SAD | | BJP | |
| Sri Muktsar Sahib | 83 | Lambi | AAP | Randhir Singh Khuddian | INC | SAD | | BJP | |
| Sri Muktsar Sahib | 84 | Gidderbaha | AAP | | INC | SAD | Sukhbir Singh Badal | BJP | |
| Sri Muktsar Sahib | 85 | Malout (SC) | AAP | | INC | SAD | | BJP | |
| Sri Muktsar Sahib | 86 | Muktsar | AAP | Jagdeep Singh Kaka Brar | INC | SAD | | BJP | |
| Faridkot | 87 | Faridkot | AAP | | INC | SAD | | BJP | |
| Faridkot | 88 | Kotkapura | AAP | Kultar Singh Sandhwan | INC | SAD | | BJP | |
| Faridkot | 89 | Jaitu (SC) | AAP | Amolak Singh | INC | SAD | | BJP | |
| Bathinda | 90 | Rampura Phul | AAP | | INC | SAD | | BJP | |
| Bathinda | 91 | Bhucho Mandi (SC) | AAP | | INC | SAD | | BJP | |
| Bathinda | 92 | Bathinda Urban | AAP | | INC | SAD | | BJP | |
| Bathinda | 93 | Bathinda Rural (SC) | AAP | Gopal Singh | INC | SAD | | BJP | |
| Bathinda | 94 | Talwandi Sabo | AAP | Baljinder Kaur | INC | SAD | | BJP | |
| Bathinda | 95 | Maur | AAP | | INC | SAD | | BJP | |
| Mansa | 96 | Mansa | AAP | | INC | SAD | | BJP | |
| Mansa | 97 | Sardulgarh | AAP | Gurpreet Singh Banawali | INC | SAD | | BJP | |
| Mansa | 98 | Budhlada (SC) | AAP | | INC | SAD | | BJP | |
| Sangrur | 99 | Lehragaga | AAP | | INC | SAD | | BJP | |
| Sangrur | 100 | Dirba (SC) | AAP | | INC | SAD | | BJP | |
| Sangrur | 101 | Sunam | AAP | | INC | SAD | | BJP | |
| Barnala | 102 | Bhadaur (SC) | AAP | Labh Singh Ugoke | INC | SAD | | BJP | |
| Barnala | 103 | Barnala | AAP | Gurmeet Singh Meet Hayer | INC | SAD | | BJP | |
| Barnala | 104 | Mehal Kalan (SC) | AAP | Kulwant Singh Pandori | INC | SAD | | BJP | |
| Malerkotla | 105 | Malerkotla | AAP | | INC | SAD | | BJP | |
| Malerkotla | 106 | Amargarh | AAP | Jaswant Singh Gajjan Majra | INC | SAD | | BJP | |
| Sangrur | 107 | Dhuri | AAP | Bhagwant Mann | INC | SAD | | BJP | |
| Sangrur | 108 | Sangrur | AAP | | INC | SAD | | BJP | |
| Patiala | 109 | Nabha (SC) | AAP | | INC | SAD | | BJP | |
| Patiala | 110 | Patiala Rural | AAP | | INC | SAD | | BJP | |
| Patiala | 111 | Rajpura | AAP | | INC | SAD | | BJP | Hardial Singh Kamboj |
| S.A.S Nagar | 112 | Dera Bassi | AAP | | INC | SAD | | BJP | |
| Patiala | 113 | Ghanaur | AAP | | INC | SAD | | BJP | |
| Patiala | 114 | Sanour | AAP | | INC | SAD | | BJP | Harmeet Singh Pathanmajra |
| Patiala | 115 | Patiala | AAP | Ajit Pal Singh Kohli | INC | SAD | | BJP | |
| Patiala | 116 | Samana | AAP | | INC | SAD | | BJP | Chetan Singh Jauramajra |
| Patiala | 117 | Shutrana (SC) | AAP | Vaninder Kaur Loomba | INC | SAD | | BJP | |

== Surveys and polls ==
=== Opinion polls ===

Seat Projections
| Date published | Polling agency | | | | | | Lead | Ref |
| Date published | Polling agency | AAP | INC | SAD | BJP | Others | Lead | Ref |
| 15 November 2026 | SCORE | 66-79 | 12-29 | 5-9 | 4-12 | 1-5 | AAP | |
| 15 October 2026 | SCORE | 69-82 | 17-34 | 2-6 | 4-12 | 2-6 | AAP | |
| 21 September 2026 | Inside Election | 44 | 41 | 17 | 11 | 4 | Hung | |
| 21 September 2026 | News Leader - Matrize | 40-45 | 35-40 | 15-25 | 22-27 | 5-10 | Hung | |
| 16 August 2026 | Desh Ka Verdict (affiliated with INC) | 39 | 50 | 14 | 12 | 2 | Hung | |
| 31 July 2026 | People's Pulse | 58–63 | 36–43 | 2–4 | 2–6 | 5–9 | AAP | |
| 17 July 2026 | Aapka Opinion (affiliated with AAP) | 67 | 34 | 4 | 12 | N/A | AAP | |
| 8 July 2026 | Opinions and Ratings (Poll of Polls) | 41 | 61 | 7 | 8 | N/A | INC | |
| 1 June 2026 | Vichar | 45 | 55 | 5 | 12 | N/A | Hung | |
| 26 April 2026 | News 4 Tak | 43 | 60 | 9 | 5 | N/A | INC | |
| 23 March 2026 | Chunavi Survey | 36 | 68 | 7 | 6 | N/A | INC | |
| 20 February 2022 | Previous Election | 92 | 18 | 3 | 2 | 2 | AAP | |

Vote Share Projections
| Date published | Polling agency | | | | | | | Lead | Ref |
| Date published | Polling agency | AAP | INC | SAD | BJP | WPD | Others | Lead | Ref |
| 15 November 2026 | SCORE | 35% | 23.5% | 14.5% | 14% | 11% | 2% | AAP | |
| 12 November 2026 | Vote Vibe | 33.5% | 27.6% | 12.5% | 14.7% | 8.1% | 3.6% | AAP | |
| 15 October 2026 | SCORE | 38% | 24% | 12.5% | 14% | 8.5% | 3% | AAP | |
| 21 September 2026 | Inside Election | 34% | 30% | 12% | 12% | N/A | 12% | AAP | |
| 21 September 2026 | News Leader - Matrize | 27% | 30% | 19% | 16% | N/A | 8% | INC | |
| 25 August 2026 | Vote Vibe | 34% | 30.2% | 11.3% | 12.2% | 6.6% | 5.7% | AAP | |
| 31 July 2026 | People's Pulse | 37% | 31% | 6% | 8% | 14% | 4% | AAP | |

=== Exit polls ===
| Polling agency | | | | | | Lead |
| Polling agency | AAP | INC | SAD | BJP | Others | Lead |
| Election results | | | | | | |

== Voter turnout and incidents ==
| District | Seats | Turnout (%) |
|---|---|---|
| Amritsar | 11 | |
| Barnala | 3 | |
| Bathinda | 6 | |
| Faridkot | 3 | |
| Fatehgarh Sahib | 3 | |
| Fazilka | 4 | |
| Firozpur | 4 | |
| Gurdaspur | 7 | |
| Hoshiarpur | 7 | |
| Jalandhar | 9 | |
| Kapurthala | 4 | |
| Ludhiana | 14 | |
| Malerkotla | 2 | |
| Mansa | 3 | |
| Moga | 4 | |
| Pathankot | 3 | |
| Patiala | 8 | |
| Rupnagar | 3 | |
| S. A. S. Nagar | 3 | |
| Sangrur | 5 | |
| S. B. S. Nagar | 3 | |
| Sri Muktsar Sahib | 4 | |
| Tarn Taran | 4 | |
| Total | 117 | |

== Results ==
=== Results by alliance or party ===
| Alliance/ Party | Popular vote | | | Seats | | |
| Alliance/ Party | Votes | % | ±pp | Contested | Won | +/− |
|---|---|---|---|---|---|---|
| AAP | | | | | | |
| INC | | | | | | |
| SAD | | | | | | |
| BJP | | | | | | |
| BSP | | | | | | |
| AD(WPD) | | | | | | |
| Others | | | | | | |
| IND | | | | | | |
| NOTA | | | | | | |
| Total | | 100% | — | | 117 | — |

=== Results by division ===
| Division | Seats | | | | | |
| Division | Seats | AAP | INC | SAD | BJP | OTH |
| Jalandhar | 45 | | | | | |
| Patiala | 35 | | | | | |
| Firozpur | 16 | | | | | |
| Faridkot | 12 | | | | | |
| Rupnagar | 9 | | | | | |
| Total | 117 | | | | | |

=== Results by district ===
| Division | District | Seats | | | | | |
| Division | District | Seats | AAP | INC | SAD | BJP | OTH |
| Jalandhar | Amritsar Sahib | 11 | | | | | |
| Jalandhar | Gurdaspur | 7 | | | | | |
| Jalandhar | Tarn Taran Sahib | 4 | | | | | |
| Jalandhar | Pathankot | 3 | | | | | |
| Jalandhar | Jalandhar | 9 | | | | | |
| Jalandhar | Hoshiarpur | 7 | | | | | |
| Jalandhar | Kapurthala | 4 | | | | | |
| Patiala | Ludhiana | 14 | | | | | |
| Patiala | Patiala | 8 | | | | | |
| Patiala | Sangrur | 5 | | | | | |
| Patiala | Barnala | 3 | | | | | |
| Patiala | Fatehgarh Sahib | 3 | | | | | |
| Patiala | Malerkotla | 2 | | | | | |
| Firozpur | Fazilka | 4 | | | | | |
| Firozpur | Firozpur | 4 | | | | | |
| Firozpur | Moga | 4 | | | | | |
| Firozpur | Sri Muktsar Sahib | 4 | | | | | |
| Rupnagar | S.B.S. Nagar | 3 | | | | | |
| Rupnagar | S.A.S. Nagar | 3 | | | | | |
| Rupnagar | Rupnagar | 3 | | | | | |
| Faridkot | Bathinda | 6 | | | | | |
| Faridkot | Faridkot | 3 | | | | | |
| Faridkot | Mansa | 3 | | | | | |
| | Total | 117 | | | | | |

=== Results by constituency ===
| District | Constituency | | Winner | | | | Runner Up | | | | Margin |
| District | No. | Name | Candidate | Party | Votes | % | Candidate | Party | Votes | % | Margin |
|---|---|---|---|---|---|---|---|---|---|---|---|
| Pathankot | 1 | Sujanpur | | | | | | | | | |
| Pathankot | 2 | Bhoa (SC) | | | | | | | | | |
| Pathankot | 3 | Pathankot | | | | | | | | | |
| Gurdaspur | 4 | Gurdaspur | | | | | | | | | |
| Gurdaspur | 5 | Dina Nagar (SC) | | | | | | | | | |
| Gurdaspur | 6 | Qadian | | | | | | | | | |
| Gurdaspur | 7 | Batala | | | | | | | | | |
| Gurdaspur | 8 | Sri Hargobindpur (SC) | | | | | | | | | |
| Gurdaspur | 9 | Fatehgarh Churian | | | | | | | | | |
| Gurdaspur | 10 | Dera Baba Nanak | | | | | | | | | |
| Amritsar | 11 | Ajnala | | | | | | | | | |
| Amritsar | 12 | Rajasansi | | | | | | | | | |
| Amritsar | 13 | Majitha | | | | | | | | | |
| Amritsar | 14 | Jandiala (SC) | | | | | | | | | |
| Amritsar | 15 | Amritsar North | | | | | | | | | |
| Amritsar | 16 | Amritsar West (SC) | | | | | | | | | |
| Amritsar | 17 | Amritsar Central | | | | | | | | | |
| Amritsar | 18 | Amritsar East | | | | | | | | | |
| Amritsar | 19 | Amritsar South | | | | | | | | | |
| Amritsar | 20 | Attari (SC) | | | | | | | | | |
| Tarn Taran | 21 | Tarn Taran | | | | | | | | | |
| Tarn Taran | 22 | Khemkaran | | | | | | | | | |
| Tarn Taran | 23 | Patti | | | | | | | | | |
| Tarn Taran | 24 | Khadoor Sahib | | | | | | | | | |
| Amritsar | 25 | Baba Bakala (SC) | | | | | | | | | |
| Kapurthala | 26 | Bholath | | | | | | | | | |
| Kapurthala | 27 | Kapurthala | | | | | | | | | |
| Kapurthala | 28 | Sultanpur Lodhi | | | | | | | | | |
| Kapurthala | 29 | Phagwara (SC) | | | | | | | | | |
| Jalandhar | 30 | Phillaur (SC) | | | | | | | | | |
| Jalandhar | 31 | Nakodar | | | | | | | | | |
| Jalandhar | 32 | Shahkot | | | | | | | | | |
| Jalandhar | 33 | Kartarpur (SC) | | | | | | | | | |
| Jalandhar | 34 | Jalandhar West (SC) | | | | | | | | | |
| Jalandhar | 35 | Jalandhar Central | | | | | | | | | |
| Jalandhar | 36 | Jalandhar North | | | | | | | | | |
| Jalandhar | 37 | Jalandhar Cantonment | | | | | | | | | |
| Jalandhar | 38 | Adampur (SC) | | | | | | | | | |
| Hoshiarpur | 39 | Mukerian | | | | | | | | | |
| Hoshiarpur | 40 | Dasuya | | | | | | | | | |
| Hoshiarpur | 41 | Urmar | | | | | | | | | |
| Hoshiarpur | 42 | Sham Chaurasi (SC) | | | | | | | | | |
| Hoshiarpur | 43 | Hoshiarpur | | | | | | | | | |
| Hoshiarpur | 44 | Chabbewal (SC) | | | | | | | | | |
| Hoshiarpur | 45 | Garhshankar | | | | | | | | | |
| Shaheed Bhagat Singh Nagar | 46 | Banga (SC) | | | | | | | | | |
| Shaheed Bhagat Singh Nagar | 47 | Nawan Shahr | | | | | | | | | |
| Shaheed Bhagat Singh Nagar | 48 | Balachaur | | | | | | | | | |
| Rupnagar | 49 | Anandpur Sahib | | | | | | | | | |
| Rupnagar | 50 | Rupnagar | | | | | | | | | |
| Rupnagar | 51 | Chamkaur Sahib (SC) | | | | | | | | | |
| Sahibzada Ajit Singh Nagar | 52 | Kharar | | | | | | | | | |
| Sahibzada Ajit Singh Nagar | 53 | S.A.S. Nagar | | | | | | | | | |
| Fatehgarh Sahib | 54 | Bassi Pathana (SC) | | | | | | | | | |
| Fatehgarh Sahib | 55 | Fatehgarh Sahib | | | | | | | | | |
| Fatehgarh Sahib | 56 | Amloh | | | | | | | | | |
| Ludhiana | 57 | Khanna | | | | | | | | | |
| Ludhiana | 58 | Samrala | | | | | | | | | |
| Ludhiana | 59 | Sahnewal | | | | | | | | | |
| Ludhiana | 60 | Ludhiana East | | | | | | | | | |
| Ludhiana | 61 | Ludhiana South | | | | | | | | | |
| Ludhiana | 62 | Atam Nagar | | | | | | | | | |
| Ludhiana | 63 | Ludhiana Central | | | | | | | | | |
| Ludhiana | 64 | Ludhiana West | | | | | | | | | |
| Ludhiana | 65 | Ludhiana North | | | | | | | | | |
| Ludhiana | 66 | Gill (SC) | | | | | | | | | |
| Ludhiana | 67 | Payal (SC) | | | | | | | | | |
| Ludhiana | 68 | Dakha | | | | | | | | | |
| Ludhiana | 69 | Raikot (SC) | | | | | | | | | |
| Ludhiana | 70 | Jagraon (SC) | | | | | | | | | |
| Moga | 71 | Nihal Singh Wala (SC) | | | | | | | | | |
| Moga | 72 | Bhagha Purana | | | | | | | | | |
| Moga | 73 | Moga | | | | | | | | | |
| Moga | 74 | Dharamkot | | | | | | | | | |
| Ferozpur | 75 | Zira | | | | | | | | | |
| Ferozpur | 76 | Firozpur City | | | | | | | | | |
| Ferozpur | 77 | Firozpur Rural (SC) | | | | | | | | | |
| Ferozpur | 78 | Guru Har Sahai | | | | | | | | | |
| Fazilka | 79 | Jalalabad | | | | | | | | | |
| Fazilka | 80 | Fazilka | | | | | | | | | |
| Fazilka | 81 | Abohar | | | | | | | | | |
| Fazilka | 82 | Balluana (SC) | | | | | | | | | |
| Sri Muktsar Sahib | 83 | Lambi | | | | | | | | | |
| Sri Muktsar Sahib | 84 | Gidderbaha | | | | | | | | | |
| Sri Muktsar Sahib | 85 | Malout (SC) | | | | | | | | | |
| Sri Muktsar Sahib | 86 | Muktsar | | | | | | | | | |
| Faridkot | 87 | Faridkot | | | | | | | | | |
| Faridkot | 88 | Kotkapura | | | | | | | | | |
| Faridkot | 89 | Jaitu (SC) | | | | | | | | | |
| Bathinda | 90 | Rampura Phul | | | | | | | | | |
| Bathinda | 91 | Bhucho Mandi (SC) | | | | | | | | | |
| Bathinda | 92 | Bathinda Urban | | | | | | | | | |
| Bathinda | 93 | Bathinda Rural (SC) | | | | | | | | | |
| Bathinda | 94 | Talwandi Sabo | | | | | | | | | |
| Bathinda | 95 | Maur | | | | | | | | | |
| Mansa | 96 | Mansa | | | | | | | | | |
| Mansa | 97 | Sardulgarh | | | | | | | | | |
| Mansa | 98 | Budhlada (SC) | | | | | | | | | |
| Sangrur | 99 | Lehragaga | | | | | | | | | |
| Sangrur | 100 | Dirba (SC) | | | | | | | | | |
| Sangrur | 101 | Sunam | | | | | | | | | |
| Sangrur | 102 | Malerkotla | | | | | | | | | |
| Sangrur | 103 | Amargarh | | | | | | | | | |
| Sangrur | 104 | Dhuri | | | | | | | | | |
| Sangrur | 105 | Sangrur | | | | | | | | | |
| Barnala | 106 | Bhadaur (SC) | | | | | | | | | |
| Barnala | 107 | Barnala | | | | | | | | | |
| Barnala | 108 | Mehal Kalan (SC) | | | | | | | | | |
| Patiala | 109 | Nabha (SC) | | | | | | | | | |
| Patiala | 110 | Patiala Rural | | | | | | | | | |
| Patiala | 111 | Rajpura | | | | | | | | | |
| Sahibzada Ajit Singh Nagar | 112 | Dera Bassi | | | | | | | | | |
| Patiala | 113 | Ghanaur | | | | | | | | | |
| Patiala | 114 | Sanour | | | | | | | | | |
| Patiala | 115 | Patiala | | | | | | | | | |
| Patiala | 116 | Samana | | | | | | | | | |
| Patiala | 117 | Shutrana (SC) | | | | | | | | | |

== See also ==
- Elections in Punjab
- Politics of Punjab
- 2024 Indian general election in Punjab
