= Ayali =

Ayali may refer to:

- Ayali (2023 TV series), an Indian Tamil digital series on ZEE5 platform
- Ayali (2025 TV series), an Indian Tamil TV series on Zee Tamil
- Ayali Kalan, a village in Ludhiana district, Punjab, India
- Ayali Khurd, a village in Ludhiana district, Punjab, India
- Manpreet Singh Ayali (born 1975), an Indian politician
