= Darshan Singh Shivalik =

Indian politician

Member of Punjab Legislative Assembly
- In office 6 March 2012 – 11 March 2017
- Preceded by: constituency created
- Succeeded by: Kuldeep Singh Vaid
- Constituency: Gill
- In office 27 February 2007 – 6 March 2012
- Preceded by: Malkiat Singh Dakha
- Succeeded by: Manpreet Singh Ayali
- Constituency: Dakha

Personal details
- Born: Punjab, India
- Party: Akali Dal (Waris Punjab De)
- Other political affiliations: Shiromani Akali Dal

Darshan Singh Shivalik is an Indian politician of Akali Dal Waris Punjab De, former member of Shiromani Akali Dal, and former Member of the Legislative Assembly of Gill and Dakha assembly constituencies.

== Political career ==
Shivalik first entered the political arena by contesting Dakha Assembly constituency in 2002 Punjab Legislative Assembly election as a candidate of Shiromani Akali Dal, placing second behind Malkiat Singh Dakha. He became MLA from Dakha in 2007. After SC delimitation of Dakha in 2008, Shivalik contested from Gill Assembly constituency in 2012 and got elected as MLA. Shivalik unsuccessfully contested from Gill in both 2017 Punjab Legislative Assembly election and 2022 Punjab Legislative Assembly election respectively. He joined Akali Dal (Waris Punjab De) in June 2026 in the presence of MLA Manpreet Singh Ayali and Tarsem Singh, father of MP Amritpal Singh.

== Electoral performance ==
Punjab Legislative Assembly Election, 2002: 55. Dakha
Party	Candidate	Votes	%	±%
INC	Malkiat Singh Dakha	51,570	44.25	▲4.47
SAD	Darshan Singh Shivalik	42,844	36.76	▼15.17
BSP	Mandeep Kaur	10,142	8.70	New entry
SAD(A)	Bikramjit Singh	7,796	6.69	▼0.88
CPI(M)	Sohan Singh	1,829	1.57	New entry
Majority		8,726	7.49	
Turnout		116,551	51.62	
Registered electors				
INC gain from SAD		Swing		

Punjab Assembly election, 2007: 54. Dakha
Party	Candidate	Votes	%	±%
SAD	Darshan Singh Shivalik	94,807	49.20	▲12.44
INC	Malkiat Singh Dakha	79,006	41.00	▼3.25
BSP	Parkash Singh Jandiali	6,742	3.50	▼5.20
CPI(M)	Amarjeet Mattu	3,610	1.87	▲0.30
Independent	Harinder Singh Khalsa	3,218	1.67	New entry
Majority		15,801		
Turnout		192,696		
Registered electors				
SAD gain from INC		Swing		

Punjab Assembly election, 2012: Gill
Party	Candidate	Votes	%	±%
SAD	Darshan Singh Shivalik	69,131	46.48	New entry
INC	Malkiat Singh Dakha	63,814	42.90	New entry
PPoP	Manjit Singh	7,729	5.20	New entry
BSP	Balvir Singh	5,839	3.93	New entry
Independent	Charan Dass	1,264	0.85	New entry
Majority		5,317	3.57	
Turnout		148,741	76.46	
Registered electors		194,529		

Punjab Assembly election, 2017: Gill
Party	Candidate	Votes	%	±%
INC	Kuldeep Singh Vaid	67,927	37.48	▼5.42
AAP	Jiwan Singh Sangowal	59,286	32.71	New entry
SAD	Darshan Singh Shivalik	46,476	25.65	▼20.83
NOTA	None of the above	1,647	0.91	▲0.39
Majority		8,641	4.77	▲1.2
Turnout		181,224	75.78	▼0.68
Registered electors		239,146		
INC gain from SAD		Swing	▼5.42	

Punjab Assembly election, 2022: Gill
Party	Candidate	Votes	%	±%
AAP	Jiwan Singh Sangowal	92,696	50.33	▲17.62
SAD	Darshan Singh Shivalik	35,052	19.03	▼6.62
INC	Kuldeep Singh Vaid	33,786	18.35	▼19.13
BJP	Sucha Ram Ladhar	12,801	6.95	New entry
LIP	Gagandeep Kainth	3,837	2.08	New entry
Independent	Rajeev Kumar Lovely	2,013	1.09	New entry
NOTA	None of the above	1,701	0.92	▲0.01
Majority		57,644	31.30	▲26.53
Turnout		184,194	67.44	▼8.34
Registered electors		273,104		
AAP gain from INC		Swing	▲17.62	
