= Manpreet Singh Ayali =

Indian politician

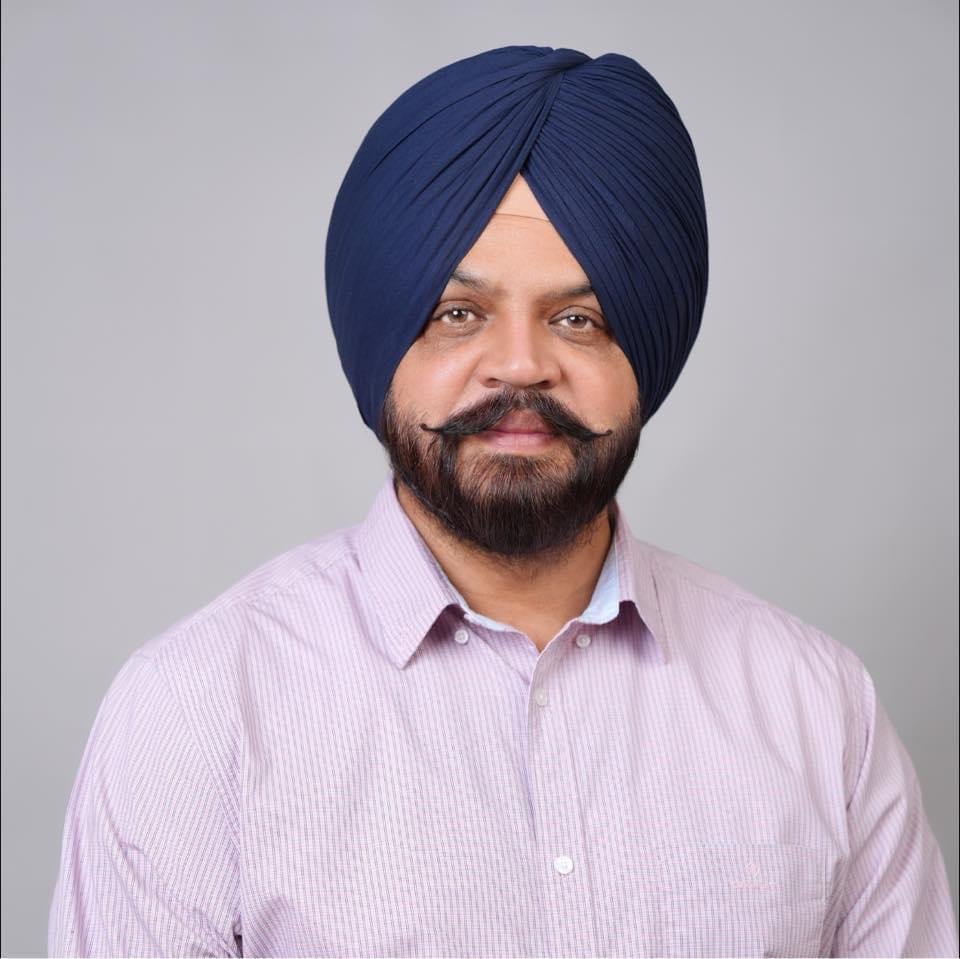

Leader of Shiromani Akali Dal in Punjab Legislative Assembly
- In office 10 March 2022 – 9 June 2026

Member of Punjab Legislative Assembly
- Incumbent
- Assumed office 29 October 2019
- Preceded by: H. S. Phoolka
- Constituency: Dakha
- In office 6 March 2012 – 11 March 2017
- Preceded by: Darshan Singh Shivalik
- Succeeded by: H. S. Phoolka
- Constituency: Dakha

Personal details
- Born: 6 January 1975 (age 51) Ayali Khurd, Punjab, India
- Party: Akali Dal (Waris Punjab De)
- Other political affiliations: Shiromani Akali Dal (Punar Surjit); Shiromani Akali Dal

Manpreet Singh Ayali (born 6 January 1975) is an Indian politician of Akali Dal Waris Punjab De, former leader of Shiromani Akali Dal in the Punjab Legislative Assembly, and currently Member of the Legislative Assembly of the Dakha.

== Early life ==
Ayali was born on 6 January 1975 to father Gurcharanjit Singh, a politician and agriculturalist. His father has served as Sarpanch of his village for 15 years. Ayali dropped out of college after completing Class 12. In 1998, he became president of agriculture society of his village and later served as sarpanch. In 2007, he became chairperson of Ludhiana Zila Parishad.

== Political career ==
=== MLA, first term (2012–2017) ===
He was first MLA from 2012 to 2017 for Shiromani Akali Dal. In 2014, Ayali contested for MP for the Ludhiana Lok Sabha Seat but lost in third place to Ravneet Singh Bittu. Ayali served as the Chairman of Zila Parishad Ludhiana from 2007 to 2013 and in 2013 he received the award for the Best Zila Parishad Chairman in the country in presence of the Prime Minister of India.

=== MLA, second term (2019–2022) ===
In 2017, Ayali lost the seat to H. S. Phoolka by 4,169 votes. He took the seat again in 2019 after the resignation of Phoolka and subsequent by-election, defeating Sandeep Sandhu.

=== MLA, third term (2022–present) ===
Ayali won from Dakha Assembly constituency for a third time in 2022. SAD only had three successful candidates in the Punjab Assembly. The Aam Aadmi Party gained a strong 79% majority in the sixteenth Punjab Legislative Assembly by winning 92 out of 117 seats in the 2022 Punjab Legislative Assembly election. MP Bhagwant Mann was sworn in as Chief Minister on 16 March 2022.

For the 2022 Indian presidential election, SAD decided to support the NDA candidate, despite SAD no longer being part of NDA. Ayali abstained from voting in the election.

== Electoral performance ==
Punjab Assembly election, 2012: 68. Dakha
Party	Candidate	Votes	%	±%
SAD	Manpreet Singh Ayali	72,208	52.19	▲2.99
INC	Jasbir Singh Khangura	55,820	40.35	▼0.65
PPoP	Daljit Singh	8,374	6.05	New entry
BSP	Surinder Singh	1,258	0.91	▼2.59
Majority		16,388	11.8	
Turnout		138,356	84.6	
Registered electors		163,484		
SAD hold		Swing		

2014 Indian general elections: Ludhiana
Party	Candidate	Votes	%	±%
INC	Ravneet Singh Bittu	300,459	27.27	▼23.81
AAP	Harvinder Singh Phoolka	280,750	25.48	New
SAD	Manpreet Singh Ayali	256,590	23.28	▼16.37
IND	Simarjit Singh Bains	210,917	19.14	N/A
BSP	Navjot Singh Mandair	8,317	0.76	▼3.10
Majority		19,709	1.79	▼11.64
Turnout		1,101,967	70.58	▲5.90
INC hold		Swing	▼25.81	

Punjab Assembly election, 2017: 68. Dakha
Party	Candidate	Votes	%	±%
AAP	Harvinder Singh Phoolka	58,923	40.55	New entry
SAD	Manpreet Singh Ayali	54,754	37.68	▼14.51
INC	Major Singh Bhaini	28,571	19.66	▼20.69
NOTA	None of the above	981	0.68	
Majority		4,169	2.87	
Turnout		145,306	80.93	
Registered electors		179,549		
AAP gain from SAD		Swing		

By-election, 2019: 68. Dakha
Party	Candidate	Votes	%	±%
SAD	Manpreet Singh Ayali	66,297	50.30	▲12.90
INC	Sandeep Singh Sandhu	51,625	39.17	▲19.67
LIP	Sukhdev Singh Chak	8,441	6.40	New entry
AAP	Amandeep Singh Mohie	2,804	2.13	▼38.17
NOTA	None of the above	642		
Majority		14,672		
Turnout		131,798	71.35	
SAD gain from AAP		Swing		

Punjab Assembly election, 2022: 68. Dakha
Party	Candidate	Votes	%	±%
SAD	Manpreet Singh Ayali	49,909	34.97	▼15.33
INC	Captain Sandeep Singh Sandhu	44,102	30.90	▼8.27
AAP	Dr KNS Kang	42,994	30.12	▲27.99
NOTA	None of the above	1,171	0.82	
Majority		5,807	4.07	
Turnout		142,739	75.73	
Registered electors		187,760		
SAD hold				
