= Rajneesh Dahiya =

Indian politician

MLA, Punjab Legislative Assembly
- Incumbent
- Assumed office 2022
- Preceded by: Satkar Kaur
- Constituency: Firozpur Rural

Personal details
- Party: Aam Aadmi Party

Rajneesh Kumar Dahiya is an Indian politician and the MLA representing the Firozpur Rural Assembly constituency in the Punjab Legislative Assembly. He is a member of the Aam Aadmi Party. He was elected as the MLA in the 2022 Punjab Legislative Assembly election.

== Member of Legislative Assembly ==
He represents the Firozpur Rural Assembly constituency as MLA in Punjab Assembly. The Aam Aadmi Party gained a strong 79% majority in the sixteenth Punjab Legislative Assembly by winning 92 out of 117 seats in the 2022 Punjab Legislative Assembly election. MP Bhagwant Mann was sworn in as Chief Minister on 16 March 2022.

Committee assignments of Punjab Legislative Assembly

- Member (2022–23) Committee on Welfare of Scheduled Castes, Scheduled Tribes and Backward Classes
- Member (2022–23) Committee on Questions & References

== Electoral performance ==
-->

Punjab Assembly election, 2022: Firozpur Rural
Party	Candidate	Votes	%	±%
AAP	Rajneesh Kumar Dahiya	75,293	49.80	
SAD	Joginder Singh Jindu	47,547	31.4	
INC	Ashu Bangar	20,396	13.5	
NOTA	None of the above	593	0.3	
Majority		27,746	18.26	
Turnout		151,909	77.2	
Registered electors		195,975		

State Legislative Assembly
Preceded by -	Member of the Punjab Legislative Assembly from Firozpur Rural Assembly constituency 2022 –	Incumbent
