= Jasvir Singh Raja Gill =

Indian politician

MLA, Punjab Legislative Assembly
- Incumbent
- Assumed office 2022
- Constituency: Urmar
- Majority: Aam Aadmi Party

Personal details
- Party: Aam Aadmi Party

Jasvir Singh Raja Gill is an Indian politician and the MLA representing the Urmar Assembly constituency in the Punjab Legislative Assembly. He is a member of the Aam Aadmi Party.

== MLA ==
He was elected as an MLA in 2022. The Aam Aadmi Party gained a strong 79% majority in the sixteenth Punjab Legislative Assembly by winning 92 out of 117 seats in the 2022 Punjab Legislative Assembly election. MP Bhagwant Mann was sworn in as Chief Minister on 16 March 2022.

Committee assignments of Punjab Legislative Assembly

- Member (2022–23) Committee on Petitions
- Member (2022–23) Committee on Agriculture and its allied activities

== Electoral performance ==
Punjab Assembly election, 2022: Urmar
| Party | Candidate | Votes | % | ±% |
|---|---|---|---|---|
| AAP | Jasvir Singh Raja Gill | 42,576 | 34.3 | |
| INC | Sangat Singh Gilzian | 38,386 | 30.9 | |
| BSP | Lakhwinder Singh | 23,191 | 18.7 | |
| SAD(S) | Manjit Singh | 10,956 | 8.8 | |
| SAD(A) | Kuldip Singh | 6,890 | 5.5 | |
| NOTA | None of the above | 880 | 0.5 | |
| Majority | | 4,190 | 3.35 | |
| Turnout | | 125,205 | 68.4 | |
| Registered electors | | 183,059 | | |

State Legislative Assembly
| Preceded by - | Member of the Punjab Legislative Assembly from Urmar Assembly constituency 2022 – | Incumbent |
