= Firozpur Rural Assembly constituency =

Legislative Assembly constituency in Punjab State, India

Coordinates: 30.98°N 74.65°E

Firozpur Rural
- Constituency No. 77 for the Punjab Legislative Assembly

Constituency details
- Country: India
- State: Punjab
- District: Firozpur
- Lok Sabha constituency: Firozpur
- Total electors: 195,975 (in 2022)
- Reservation: SC

Member of Legislative Assembly
- 16th Punjab Legislative Assembly
- Incumbent Rajneesh Kumar Dahiya
- Party: Aam Aadmi Party
- Elected year: 2022

Firozpur Rural is one of the 117 Legislative Assembly constituencies of Punjab state in India. It is part of Firozpur district and is reserved for candidates belonging to the Scheduled Castes.

== Members of the Legislative Assembly ==
Most successful parties from Firozpur Rural Vidhan Sabha
1. SAD (1 Time) (33.3%)
2. INC (1 Time) (33.3%)
3. AAP (1 Time) (33.3%)

Year	Member	Party
2012	Joginder Singh Alias Jindu	Shiromani Akali Dal
2017	Satkar Kaur	Indian National Congress
2022	Rajneesh Kumar Dahiya	Aam Aadmi Party

== Election results ==
=== 2027 ===
Punjab Assembly election, 2027: Firozpur Rural
Party	Candidate	Votes	%	±%
AAP				
AD (WPD)				New entry
INC				
BSP				
SAD				
BJP				New entry
NOTA	None of the above			
Majority				
Turnout				

=== 2022 ===
Punjab Assembly election, 2022: Firozpur Rural
Party	Candidate	Votes	%	±%
AAP	Rajneesh Kumar Dahiya	75,293	49.80	▲29.25
SAD	Joginder Singh Jindu	47,547	31.40	▼0.47
INC	Ashu Bangar	20,396	13.50	▼32.10
SAD(A)	Naseeb Kaur	3,196	2.10	▲
Independent	Morda Singh	1,749	1.20	▲1.78
PLC	Jaswinder Singh	777	0.50	New entry
NOTA	None of the above	593	0.30	
Majority		27,746	18.26	
Turnout		151,909	77.20	
Registered electors		195,975		
AAP gain from INC		Swing	{{{swing}}}	

=== 2017 ===
Punjab Assembly election, 2017: Firozpur Rural
Party	Candidate	Votes	%	±%
INC	Satkar Kaur	71,037	45.60	▲0.32
SAD	Joginder Singh Jindu	49,657	31.87	▼13.53
AAP	Mohan Singh Phallian Wala	32,011	20.55	New entry
NOTA	None of the above	920	0.59	
Majority		21,380	13.72	
Turnout		155,792	84.37	
Registered electors		185,748		
INC gain from SAD		Swing	{{{swing}}}	

=== 2012 ===
Punjab Assembly election, 2012: Firozpur Rural
Party	Candidate	Votes	%	±%
SAD	Joginder Singh Jindu	61,830	45.40	New entry
INC	Satkar Kaur	61,668	45.28	New entry
PPoP	Hansa Singh	7,621	5.60	New entry
BSP	Harbans Singh	1,922	1.41	New entry
SAD(A)	Sukhdev Singh	784	0.58	New entry
Majority		162	0.12	
Turnout		136,196	84.49	
Registered electors		160,447		
SAD win (new seat)				

== See also ==
- List of constituencies of the Punjab Legislative Assembly
- Firozpur district
