= Shahkot Assembly constituency =

Legislative Assembly constituency in Punjab State, India

Coordinates: 31.08°N 75.34°E

Shahkot
- Constituency No. 32 for the Punjab Legislative Assembly

Constituency details
- Country: India
- State: Punjab
- District: Jalandhar
- Lok Sabha constituency: Jalandhar
- Total electors: 182,103
- Reservation: None

Member of Legislative Assembly
- 16th Punjab Legislative Assembly
- Incumbent Hardev Singh Laddi
- Party: Indian National Congress
- Elected year: 2022

Shahkot Assembly constituency (Sl. No.: 32) is a Punjab Legislative Assembly constituency in Jalandhar district, Punjab state, India.

== Members of Legislative Assembly ==
Most successful parties from Shahkot Vidhan Sabha
1. SAD (3 Times) (60.0%)
2. INC (2 Times) (40.0%)

| Year | Member | Party |
|---|---|---|
| 1962 | Dalip Singh | Shiromani Akali Dal |
Constituency defunct (1967-2008)
| 2012 | Ajit Singh Kohar | Shiromani Akali Dal |
| 2017 | Ajit Singh Kohar | Shiromani Akali Dal |
| 2018^ | Hardev Singh Laddi | Indian National Congress |
| 2022 | Hardev Singh Laddi | Indian National Congress |

^: by-election

== Election Result ==
=== 2027 ===
Punjab Assembly election, 2027: Shahkot
| Party | Candidate | Votes | % | ±% |
|---|---|---|---|---|
| AAP | | | | |
| AD (WPD) | | | | New entry |
| INC | | | | |
| BSP | | | | |
| SAD | | | | |
| BJP | | | | |
| NOTA | None of the above | | | |
| Majority | | | | |
| Turnout | | | | |

=== 2022 ===
Punjab Assembly election, 2022: Shahkot
| Party | Candidate | Votes | % | ±% |
|---|---|---|---|---|
| INC | Hardev Singh Laddi | 51,661 | 38.99 | ▼24.12 |
| SAD | Bachitar Singh Kohar | 39,582 | 29.87 | ▼3.65 |
| AAP | Rattan Singh Kakarkalan | 29,348 | 22.15 | ▲20.70 |
| SAD(A) | Sulakhan Singh | 5,779 | 4.36 | New entry |
| BJP | Narinder Pal Singh Chandi | 1,449 | 1.09 | New entry |
| NOTA | None of the above | 866 | 0.65 | |
| Majority | | 12,079 | 9.12 | |
| Turnout | | 132,510 | 72.8 | |
| Registered electors | | 182,103 | | |
| INC hold | | Swing | | |

=== 2018 ===
By-election, 2018: Shahkot
| Party | Candidate | Votes | % | ±% |
|---|---|---|---|---|
| INC | Hardev Singh Laddi | 82,747 | 63.11 | ▲31.88 |
| SAD | Naib Singh Kohar | 43,945 | 33.52 | ▼1.36 |
| AAP | Rattan Singh Kakarkalan | 1,900 | 1.45 | ▼29.04 |
| NOTA | None of the above | 1,268 | 0.97 | |
| Majority | | 38,802 | 29.59 | |
| Turnout | | 1,32,391 | 76.61 | |
| INC gain from SAD | | Swing | | |

=== 2017 ===
Punjab Assembly election, 2017: Shahkot
| Party | Candidate | Votes | % | ±% |
|---|---|---|---|---|
| SAD | Ajit Singh Kohar | 46,913 | 34.88 | ▼10.29 |
| INC | Hardev Singh Laddi | 42,008 | 31.23 | ▼9.55 |
| AAP | Amarjit Singh Mehatpur | 41,010 | 30.49 | New entry |
| BSP | Charanjit Kumar Nahar | 952 | 0.71 | ▼1.67 |
| CPI(M) | Bachittar Singh | 903 | 0.67 | New entry |
| NOTA | None of the above | 849 | 0.50 | |
| Majority | | 4,905 | 3.60 | |
| Turnout | | 134,507 | 78.60 | |
| Registered electors | | 172,255 | | |
| SAD hold | | Swing | | |

=== 2012 ===
Punjab Assembly election, 2012: Shahkot
| Party | Candidate | Votes | % | ±% |
|---|---|---|---|---|
| SAD | Ajit Singh Kohar | 55,875 | 45.17 | New entry |
| INC | Col C D Singh Kamboj | 50,440 | 40.78 | New entry |
| PPoP | Navjot Singh | 9,845 | 7.96 | New entry |
| BSP | Sukhram Chauhan | 2,949 | 2.38 | New entry |
| Majority | | 5,435 | 4.39 | |
| Turnout | | 123,697 | 80.09 | |
| Registered electors | | 154,449 | | |
| SAD win (new seat) | | | | |

== See also ==
- List of constituencies of the Punjab Legislative Assembly
- Jalandhar district
