= Hardev Singh Laddi =

Indian politician

Hardev Singh Laddi Sherowalia (born 1968) is an Indian politician from Punjab. He is an MLA from Shahkot Assembly constituency in Jalandhar District. He won the 2022 Punjab Legislative Assembly election, representing the Indian National Congress.

== Early life and education ==
Laddi is from Shahkot, Jalandhar District, Punjab. He is the son of Harjinder Singh. He passed Class 10 in 1984 in the examinations conducted by Punjab School Education Board.

== Career ==
Laddi won from Shahkot Assembly constituency representing the Indian National Congress in the 2022 Punjab Legislative Assembly election. He polled 51,661 votes and defeated his nearest rival, Bachitar Singh Kohar of the Shiromani Akali Dal, by a margin of 12,079 votes. He first became an MLA winning the 2018 Punjab Legislative Assembly by election, defeating Naib Singh Kohar of the Shiromani Akali Dal, by a margin of 38,801 votes.
