= Amolak Singh =

Indian politician

MLA, Punjab Legislative Assembly
- Incumbent
- Assumed office 2022
- Constituency: Jaitu
- Majority: Aam Aadmi Party

Personal details
- Party: Aam Aadmi Party

Amolak Singh is an Indian politician and the MLA representing the Jaitu Assembly constituency in the Punjab Legislative Assembly. He is a member of the Aam Aadmi Party. He was elected as the MLA in the 2022 Punjab Legislative Assembly election.

== Member of Legislative Assembly ==
He represents the Jaitu Assembly constituency as MLA in Punjab Assembly. The Aam Aadmi Party gained a strong 79% majority in the sixteenth Punjab Legislative Assembly by winning 92 out of 117 seats in the 2022 Punjab Legislative Assembly election. MP Bhagwant Mann was sworn in as Chief Minister on 16 March 2022.

Committee assignments of Punjab Legislative Assembly

- Member (2022–23) Committee on Estimates
- Member (2022–23) Committee on Papers laid/to be laid on the table and Library

== Electoral performance ==
-->

Punjab Assembly election, 2022: Jaitu
Party	Candidate	Votes	%	±%
AAP	Amolak Singh	60,242	52.2	
SAD	Manjit Singh Alias Suba Singh	27,453	23.8	
INC	Darshan Palsingh Dilwan	19,388	16.8	
NOTA	None of the above	894	0.6	
Majority		32,789	28.19	
Turnout		116,318	76.6	
Registered electors		151,056		

State Legislative Assembly
Preceded by -	Member of the Punjab Legislative Assembly from Jaitu Assembly constituency 2022 –	Incumbent
