= Bhaana Sidhu =

Indian social activist, actor and vlogger

- Born: Barnala, Punjab
- Occupations: Social activist, actor and vlogger

Kaka Singh Sidhu, professionally known as Bhaana Sidhu is an Indian social activist, actor and vlogger. He is known for his contributions as a social activist and also he is known for his roles in films like Sufna and Moosa Jatt.

== Biography ==
Sidhu was born in village Kot Dhunna, Barnala, Punjab, to Sardar Bikkar Singh. He completed his graduation from Punjabi University, Patiala. His grandfather, Sardar Kartar Singh, was the chairman of the Bharatiya Kisan Union. Sidhu was actively involved in the 2021 farmers' protest. Sidhu began his career in comedy alongside his brother Amna Sidhu and relative Harinder Sidhu, also known as Producer Dxx and their early work faced significant criticism for its use of explicit language. Sidhu subsequently transitioned to acting in Punjabi cinema, with notable appearances including the Sidhu Moosewala starrer Moosa Jatt and Ammy Virk Starrer Sufna. He has featured in various Punjabi music videos such as Sidhu Moosewala’s Doctor, G Khan's Fakkar, Gallan, Balkar Ankhila’ s Vaardat, Zafar's Thapian.

Beside his work as an artist, Sidhu is a social activist. He redirected his attention to the problem of immigration agents deceiving young people by demanding large sums of money under the false pretense of facilitating their travel abroad. His intervention led to several immigration agents returning the illicitly obtained funds to the victims. He also voiced criticism regarding the government's failures.

== Controversy ==
Sidhu has been involved in at least eight separate cases since 2019, including four cases registered against him within a single week in January 2024. He was arrested on charges of extorting a Ludhiana-based immigration agent. Later that same day, Sidhu and his brother were also booked for extortion by the police in Mohali following a complaint lodged by another immigration agent. On January 26, a new extortion case was filed against him in Abohar.

On February 3, 2024, a substantial group of demonstrators, including young people and farmers, obstructed the national highway near Jheormajra village in Sangrur. The protesters breached police barricades in an attempt to reach the chief minister's residence in Sangrur, demanding the release of Sidhu. On February 12, 2024, Bhaana Sidhu was granted bail by a court in Mohali, Following the court's decision, Sidhu was released from Patiala Jail.

Sidhu is associated with Akali Dal (Waris Punjab De), and a FIR was registered by Chandigarh Police against him and 14 other members of the party after a major protest in Chandigarh on 29 July 2026.

== Filmography ==
Year	Movie	Character	Notes
2020	Sufna	Nishan Singh	Debut
2021	Moosa Jatt	Swarn Sidhu	
