= H. S. Phoolka =

Indian politician

Harvinder Singh Phoolka
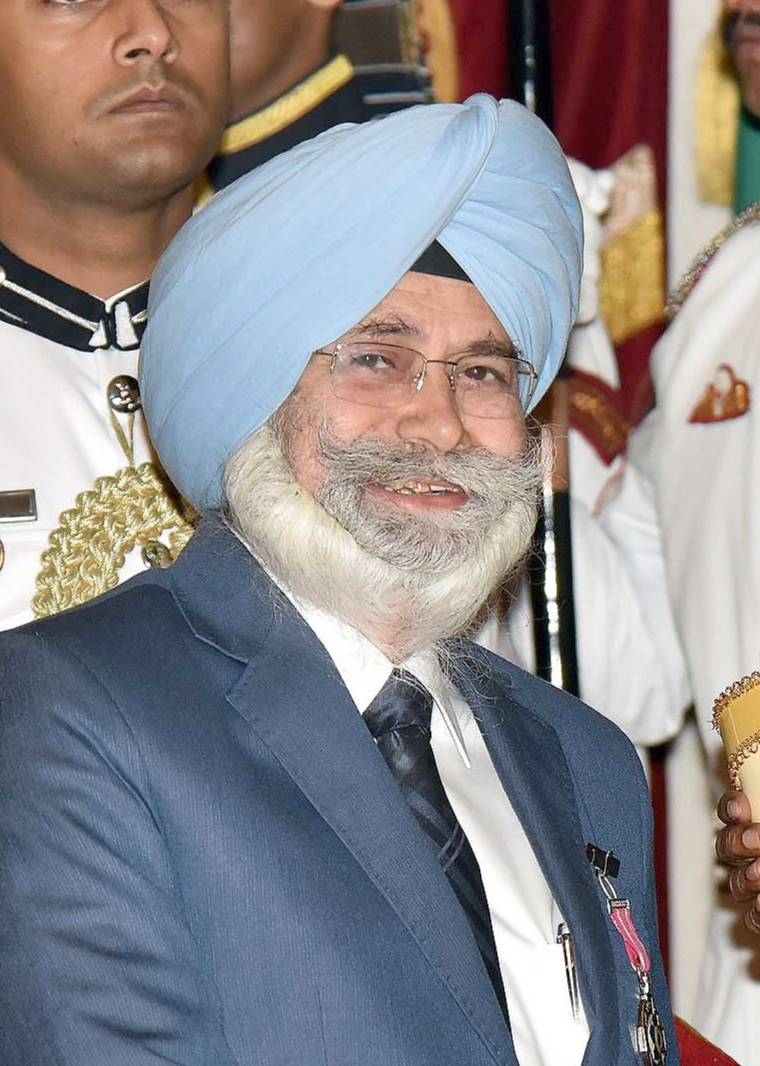

Member of Punjab Legislative Assembly
- In office 16 March 2017 – 12 October 2018
- Preceded by: Manpreet Singh Ayali
- Succeeded by: Manpreet Singh Ayali
- Constituency: Dakha

Leader of the Opposition in the Punjab Legislative Assembly
- In office 16 March 2017 – 20 July 2017
- Preceded by: Charanjit Singh Channi
- Succeeded by: Sukhpal Singh Khaira

Senior Advocate of Supreme Court of India & Delhi High Court

Personal details
- Born: 24 August 1955 (age 70) Bhadaur, Punjab, India
- Party: Aam Aadmi Party (2014–2026); Bharatiya Janata Party (2026–present)
- Spouse: Maninder Kaur
- Education: Bachelor in Law, Chandigarh
- Awards: Padma Shri

Harvinder Singh Phoolka, is a senior advocate of Delhi High Court, politician, human rights activist, and author. He served as the Leader of the Opposition in the Punjab Legislative Assembly.

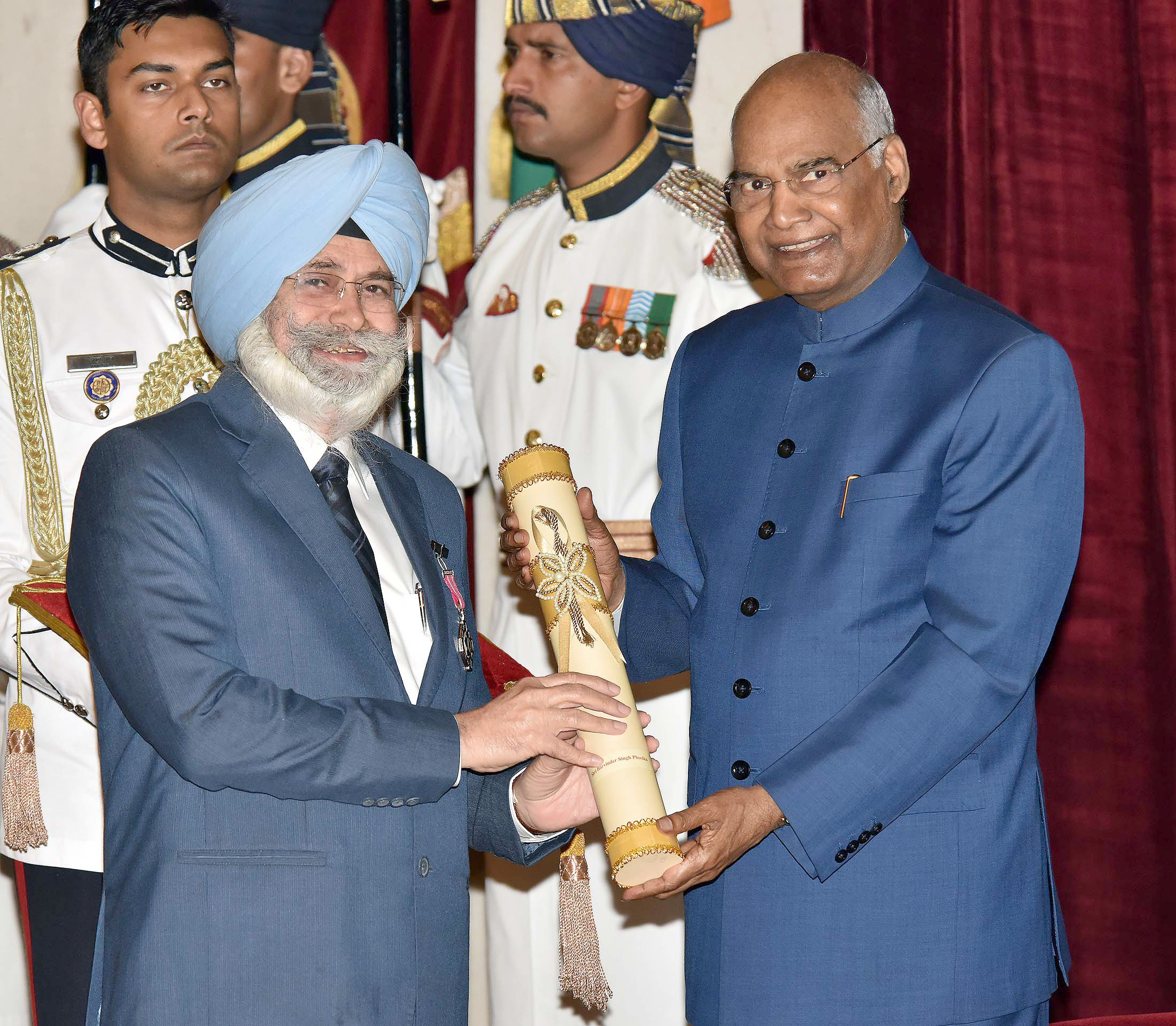
The President, Shri Ram Nath Kovind (right) presenting the Padma Shri Award to Harvinder Singh Phoolka (left), in New Delhi on March 16, 2019.

He is known for spearheading what is described as "one of the longest and most torturous legal battles" and "crusades" to gain justice for the victims of 1984 anti-Sikh riots and fighting individual cases on the involvement of Congress-I leaders H. K. L. Bhagat, Sajjan Kumar and Jagdish Tytler despite the government cover-up. He received threatening letters for unearthing involvements of ruling political party leaders in what the Asian Age called "the Mother of all Cover-ups" in a front-page story. The special anniversary edition of the Outlook included Phoolka in its list of 50 people that make a difference in India, alongside Amartya Sen and Abhinav Ghosh. He unsuccessfully contested 2014 Lok Sabha Polls as an AAP Candidate from Ludhiana. In 2017 he successfully contested from Dakha Assembly constituency, but resigned on 12 October 2018 over alleged failure of Congress government in acting on Ranjit Singh commission's inquiry report on desecration of Guru Granth Sahib Ji. However his resignation was accepted by speaker after nearly 10 months on 9 August 2019.

== Early life and education ==
Phoolka's formative years were spent at his native village Bhadaur, into Sidhu Jat royal family in the Barnala district of Punjab, India. His education began in a small school in his village. He graduated from Ludhiana, and went to Law School in Chandigarh.

== Family ==
Phoolka married Maninder Kaur in 1983. She is a food technologist and was a 1990 "outstanding graduate" of American Institute of Baking, Kansas. She is said to have declined job offers in the United States and returned to India to support her husband's struggle for justice.

== Career ==
After completing his law degree in Chandigarh, Phoolka landed in Delhi to practice law. He served as member-secretary of the Justice Narula Committee formed in 1993 to probe the carnage. He was later appointed the counsel for Central Government in January 2001. He is known as a lawyer who won't take up a case if he finds that the client is in the wrong.

In 2014 he joined Aam Aadmi Party. In 2017 he won from Dakha Assembly constituency following which he was appointed the Leader of Opposition to Punjab Legislative Assembly. This appointment brought problems in his legal career, the Delhi Bar Council disallowed him from continuing his legal practice citing his acquiring an office of profit as the Leader of Opposition, hence, in July 2017, he resigned as the Leader of Opposition to fight the 1984-Sikh-riot case in the Delhi High Court. In January 2019, he left AAP stating that he wanted to dedicate his life to starting a movement against the atrocities committed during the 1984-Sikh-Riots.

== 1984 Anti-Sikh riots ==
Phoolka is well known for spearheading the crusade to seek justice in the 1984 anti-Sikh genocide in New Delhi that followed the assassination of Indira Gandhi and resulted in the killing of approximately 2,733 Sikhs and displacement of over 50,000 Sikhs within 2 days. He was then just 28 years old and new to practising law and the city of Delhi. He has put the cause of justice for 1984 Sikh massacre victims before his career and family life.

=== First encounter and escaping the massacre ===
Phoolka was caught in the massacre while driving pregnant wife Maninder Kaur home on his motorbike. When informed by a friend of the attacks on Sikhs, he avoided the main roads to reach his home in South Delhi via the slums of Kotla Mubarakpur. Phoolka's Hindu landlord drove the mob away by telling them that the Phoolka family had left Delhi and hid them in his store room. There the Phoolkas spent 2 days, and came out under escort. They then flew to Chandigarh in the cockpit of an overcrowded plane.

=== Resolution to fight ===
Phoolka planned to move his residence to Chandigarh after the riots, but he learned that lawyers were needed to draft affidavits on behalf of the victims, and went to the Farsh Vihar relief camp to help. The sight of orphans, bereaved mothers and wives in the relief camp prompted the Phoolkas to change their plans. Instead of relocating to Chandigarh, they chose to stay and help the victims of the massacre. Since then, Phoolka has fought cases relentlessly for the victims despite alleged government cover-up.

=== Citizens Justice Committee and The Sikh Forum ===
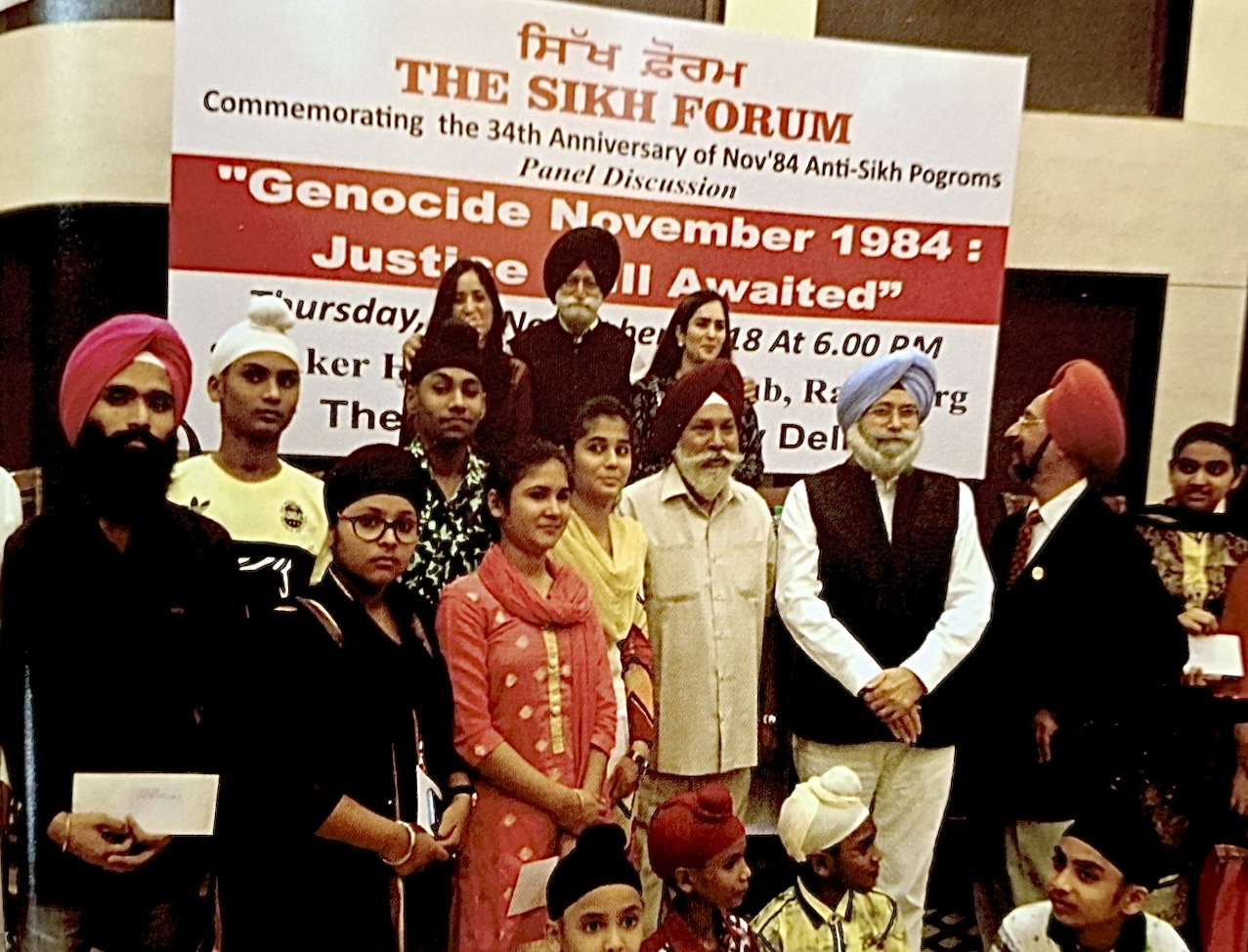
Descendants of the victims of the 1984 anti-Sikh riots with The Sikh Forum; Harvinder Singh Phoolka, D.I.G. Partap Singh and Pushpindar Singh can be seen in the photograph.

Phoolka conceived and pursued the formation of the Citizen's Justice Committee (CJC). The CJC served as an umbrella organisation for several human rights activists and legal luminaries. Floated in May 1985, the CJC has been pivotal in representing the 1984 anti-Sikh massacre victims before the various judicial commissions that have been formed for inquiry into the massacres. Membership included Justice Ranjit Singh Narula, Soli Sorabjee, General Jagjit Singh Aurora, Justice V. M. Tarkunde and Khushwant Singh. As a counselor for the CJC, Phoolka represented the victims before the first formal sitting of the Mishra Commission on 29 July 1985. The proceedings of the sitting were not made public and were closed to the press. In March 1986, the CJC withdrew its co-operation from the Mishra Commission because it disagreed with the commission's decision to hold secret proceedings, and started filing individual court cases. Phoolka was and is involved with The Sikh Forum since its inception and makes regular speeches and visits to the bi-annual meetings of the Forum.

=== Mooting of Carnage84 website ===
To make the many documents and findings of Citizens Justice Committee on 1984 Sikh massacre available to the general public, Phoolka mooted the idea of the "Carnage84.com" website, which was launched 10 July 2001 and claimed 150,000 visits from people of 30 different countries within only 10 days of it going online.

Blog on 1984 trials and related issues. Mr. Phoolka has recently started to write a blog on matters relating to the 1984 riots. His blog can be accessed at www.phoolka.org and at phoolka.wordpress.com Mr. Phoolka has also decided to tweet on issues relating to 1984 riots. His Twitter address is www.twitter.com/hsphoolka

=== Political career ===
Phoolka joined the Aam Aadmi Party in January 2014. In the Lok Sabha election of 2014, he contested well from Ludhiana in Punjab on the Aam Admi Party (AAP) ticket but he lost to the Congress candidate Ravneet Singh Bittu by 19,709 votes. Phoolka contested 2017 Punjab assembly elections and won the Dhaka constituency defeating Akali leader Manpreet Singh Ayali. On 1 April 2026, Phoolka joined the Bharatiya Janata Party.

== Notable quotes ==
The fight for justice by the riot victims sent a message that the powerful and the mighty could be challenged and demolished. They were like a rock and riot victims were like ants trying to push the rock. Over the years, with our efforts, we have been able to force the rock to roll and now it rolls like a football the moment we come near it. If we stop in our efforts, it would again become stationary and grow into a mountain.

Before the 1984 riots, there were no criminals in politics. Criminals just followed the politicians. But 1984 made them realise people leading mobs and killing others could get elected and become leaders......So a way was opened for criminals to make politics a profession.

== Book ==
Phoolka, along with human rights activist and journalist Manoj Mitta, has written the first account of the 1984 Anti-Sikh massacre in the form of a book titled When a Tree Shook Delhi.

== Electoral performance ==
2014 Indian general elections: Ludhiana
Party	Candidate	Votes	%	±%
INC	Ravneet Singh Bittu	300,459	27.27	▼23.81
AAP	Harvinder Singh Phoolka	280,750	25.48	New
SAD	Manpreet Singh Ayali	256,590	23.28	▼16.37
IND	Simarjit Singh Bains	210,917	19.14	N/A
BSP	Navjot Singh Mandair	8,317	0.76	▼3.10
Majority		19,709	1.79	▼11.64
Turnout		1,101,967	70.58	▲5.90
INC hold		Swing	▼25.81	

Punjab Assembly election, 2017: 68. Dakha
Party	Candidate	Votes	%	±%
AAP	Harvinder Singh Phoolka	58,923	40.55	New entry
SAD	Manpreet Singh Ayali	54,754	37.68	▼14.51
INC	Major Singh Bhaini	28,571	19.66	▼20.69
NOTA	None of the above	981	0.68	
Majority		4,169	2.87	
Turnout		145,306	80.93	
Registered electors		179,549		
AAP gain from SAD		Swing		
