= Jaitu Assembly constituency =

Legislative Assembly constituency in Punjab State, India

Coordinates: 30.49°N 74.89°E

Jaitu
- Constituency No. 89 for the Punjab Legislative Assembly

Constituency details
- Country: India
- State: Punjab
- District: Faridkot
- Lok Sabha constituency: Faridkot
- Total electors: 151,056 (in 2022)
- Reservation: SC

Member of Legislative Assembly
- 16th Punjab Legislative Assembly
- Incumbent Amolak Singh
- Party: Aam Aadmi Party
- Elected year: 2022

Jaitu is one of the 117 Legislative Assembly constituencies of the Punjab state in India. It is part of the Faridkot district and is reserved for candidates belonging to the Scheduled Castes.

== Members of the Legislative Assembly ==
Most successful parties from Jaitu Vidhan Sabha
1. INC (4 Times) (50.0%)
2. AAP (2 Times) (25.0%)
3. IND (2 Times) (25.0%)

Year	Member	Party
As part of Punjab Legislative Assembly
2022	Amolak Singh	Aam Aadmi Party
2017	Baldev Singh	Aam Aadmi Party
2012	Joginder Singh	Indian National Congress
Constituency does not exist (1967 - 2012, Part of Panjgrain Assembly Constituency)
1962	Tirlochan Singh	Indian National Congress
1957	Jagdish Kaur	Independent politician
As part of Patiala and East Punjab States Union Legislative Assembly (1951–56)
1954	Hira Singh	Indian National Congress
1951 (Twin-member constituency of Kotakpura - Jaitu)	Ranjit Singh	Indian National Congress
1951 (Twin-member constituency of Kotakpura - Jaitu)	Manjit Inder Singh	Independent politician

== Election results ==
=== 2027 ===
Punjab Assembly election, 2027: Jaitu
Party	Candidate	Votes	%	±%
AAP	Amolak Singh			
AD (WPD)				New entry
INC				
BSP				
SAD				
BJP				
NOTA	None of the above			
Majority				
Turnout				
Registered electors				

=== 2022 ===
Punjab Assembly election, 2022: Jaitu
Party	Candidate	Votes	%	±%
AAP	Amolak Singh	60,242	52.2	
SAD	Manjit Singh Alias Suba Singh	27,453	23.8	
INC	Darshan Palsingh Dilwan	19,388	16.8	
SAD(A)	Gurdeep Singh	3,138	2.7	
SAD(S)	Paramjit Kaur Gulshan	2,005	1.7	
NOTA	None of the above	894	0.6	
Majority		32,789	28.19	
Turnout		116,318	76.6	
Registered electors		151,056		

=== 2017 ===
Punjab Assembly election, 2017: Jaitu
Party	Candidate	Votes	%	±%
AAP	Baldev Singh	45,344	37.8	
INC	Mohammad Sadique	35,351	29.5	
SAD	Manjit Singh @ Suba Singh	33,064	27.6	
NOTA	None of the above	677	0.5	
Majority		9,993	8.4	
Turnout		119,167	83.6	
Registered electors		143,296		

== See also ==
- List of constituencies of the Punjab Legislative Assembly
- Faridkot district
