= Gill Assembly constituency =

Legislative Assembly constituency in Punjab State, India

Coordinates: 30.85°N 75.86°E

Gill
- Constituency No. 66 for the Punjab Legislative Assembly

Constituency details
- Country: India
- State: Punjab
- District: Ludhiana
- Lok Sabha constituency: Ludhiana
- Total electors: 273,104 (in 2022)
- Reservation: SC

Member of Legislative Assembly
- 16th Punjab Legislative Assembly
- Incumbent Jiwan Singh Sangowal
- Party: Aam Aadmi Party
- Elected year: 2022

Gill is one of the 117 Legislative Assembly constituencies of Punjab state in India. It is part of Ludhiana district and is reserved for candidates belonging to the Scheduled Castes.Gill is the most populous Assembly constituency in Punjab in terms of electorate.

== Members of the Legislative Assembly ==
Most successful parties from Gill Vidhan Sabha
1. SAD (1 Time) (33.3%)
2. INC(1 Time) (33.3%)
3. AAP (1 Time) (33.3%)

Year	Member	Party
2012	Darshan Singh Shivalik	Shiromani Akali Dal
2017	Kuldeep Singh Vaid	Indian National Congress
2022	Jiwan Singh Sangowal	Aam Aadmi Party

== Election results ==
=== 2027 ===
Punjab Assembly election, 2027: Gill
Party	Candidate	Votes	%	±%
AAP				
AD (WPD)	Darshan Singh Shivalik			New entry
INC				
BSP				
SAD	Harpreet Singh Simak			
BJP				
NOTA	None of the above			
Majority				
Turnout				

=== 2022 ===
Punjab Assembly election, 2022: Gill
Party	Candidate	Votes	%	±%
AAP	Jiwan Singh Sangowal	92,696	50.33	▲17.62
SAD	Darshan Singh Shivalik	35,052	19.03	▼6.62
INC	Kuldeep Singh Vaid	33,786	18.35	▼19.13
BJP	Sucha Ram Ladhar	12,801	6.95	New entry
LIP	Gagandeep Kainth	3,837	2.08	New entry
Independent	Rajeev Kumar Lovely	2,013	1.09	New entry
NOTA	None of the above	1,701	0.92	▲0.01
Majority		57,644	31.30	▲26.53
Turnout		184,194	67.44	▼8.34
Registered electors		273,104		
AAP gain from INC		Swing	▲17.62	

=== 2017 ===
Punjab Assembly election, 2017: Gill
Party	Candidate	Votes	%	±%
INC	Kuldeep Singh Vaid	67,927	37.48	▼5.42
AAP	Jiwan Singh Sangowal	59,286	32.71	New entry
SAD	Darshan Singh Shivalik	46,476	25.65	▼20.83
NOTA	None of the above	1,647	0.91	▲0.39
Majority		8,641	4.77	▲1.2
Turnout		181,224	75.78	▼0.68
Registered electors		239,146		
INC gain from SAD		Swing	▼5.42	

=== 2012 ===
Punjab Assembly election, 2012: Gill
Party	Candidate	Votes	%	±%
SAD	Darshan Singh Shivalik	69,131	46.48	New entry
INC	Malkiat Singh Dakha	63,814	42.90	New entry
PPoP	Manjit Singh	7,729	5.20	New entry
BSP	Balvir Singh	5,839	3.93	New entry
Independent	Charan Dass	1,264	0.85	New entry
Majority		5,317	3.57	
Turnout		148,741	76.46	
Registered electors		194,529		

== See also ==
- List of constituencies of the Punjab Legislative Assembly
- Ludhiana district
