= Manoj Mitta =

Indian journalist and author

Manoj Mitta is an Indian journalist and author. He is a senior editor with The Times of India, where he writes on legal, public policy, and human rights issues. He is a law graduate and previously worked for The Indian Express and India Today.

== Books ==
- When a Tree Shook Delhi: The 1984 Carnage and Its Aftermath with H. S. Phoolka
- The Fiction of Fact-Finding: Modi & Godhra
- Caste Pride: Battles for Equality in Hindu India
