= Akali Dal (Waris Punjab De) =

Political party in India

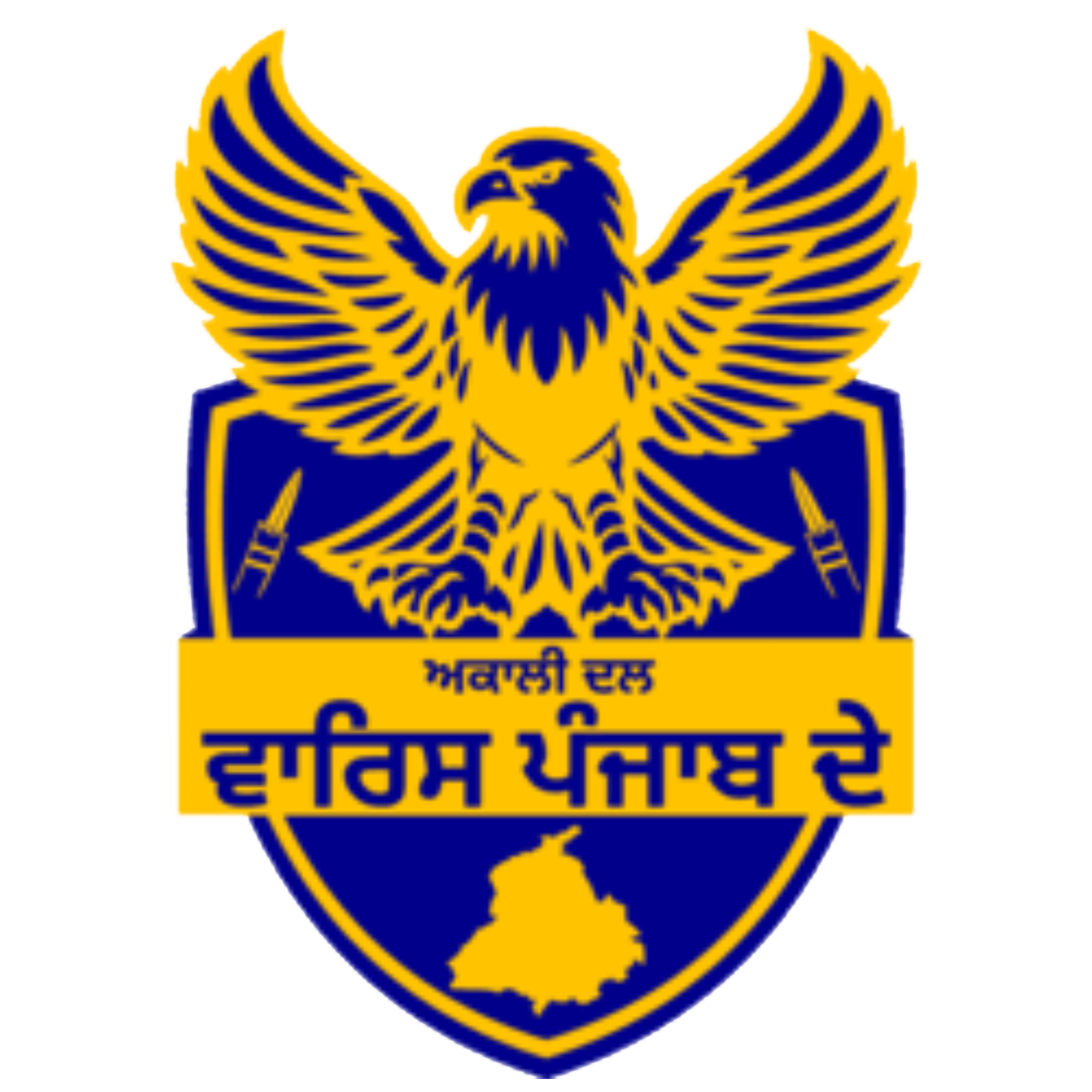
- Abbreviation: AD(WPD)
- President: Amritpal Singh
- Secretary: Mandeep Singh Sidhu
- Lok Sabha Leader: Sarabjeet Singh Khalsa
- Founded: 14 January 2025 (22 months ago)
- Headquarters: Pheruman Road, Rayya, Amritsar, Punjab,143112
- Youth wing: Sukhdev Singh Qadian
- Women's wing: Harpreet Kaur Phillaur
- Labour wing: Waris Punjab De (WPD)
- Ideology: Sikh nationalism Punjabi regionalism Right-wing populism
- Political position: Right-wing to far-right
- Colours: Saffron & Dark Blue
- ECI status: Unregistered
- Seats in Rajya Sabha: 0 / 245
- Seats in Lok Sabha: 2 / 543
- Seats in Punjab Legislative Assembly: 1 / 117

Party flag
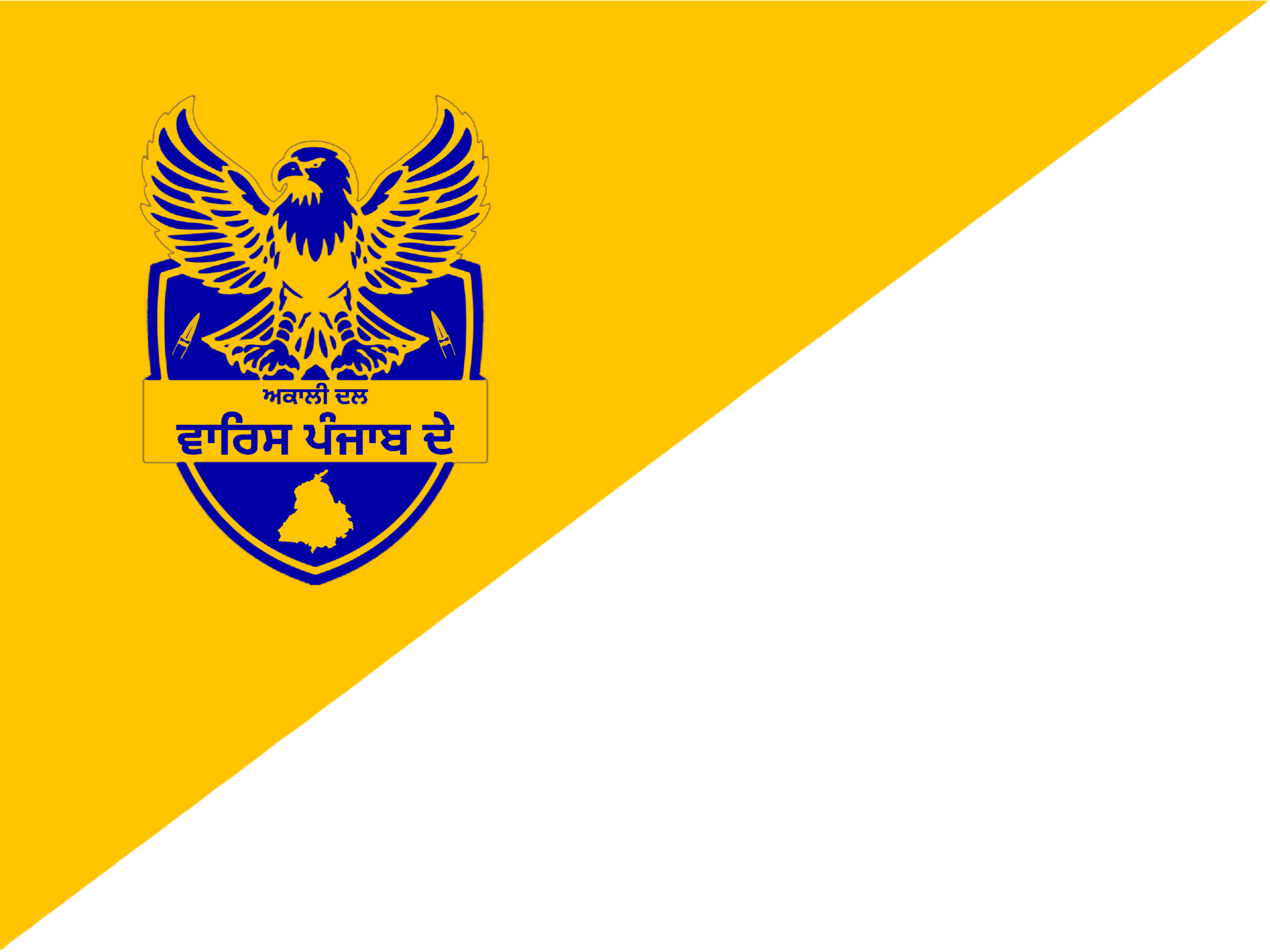
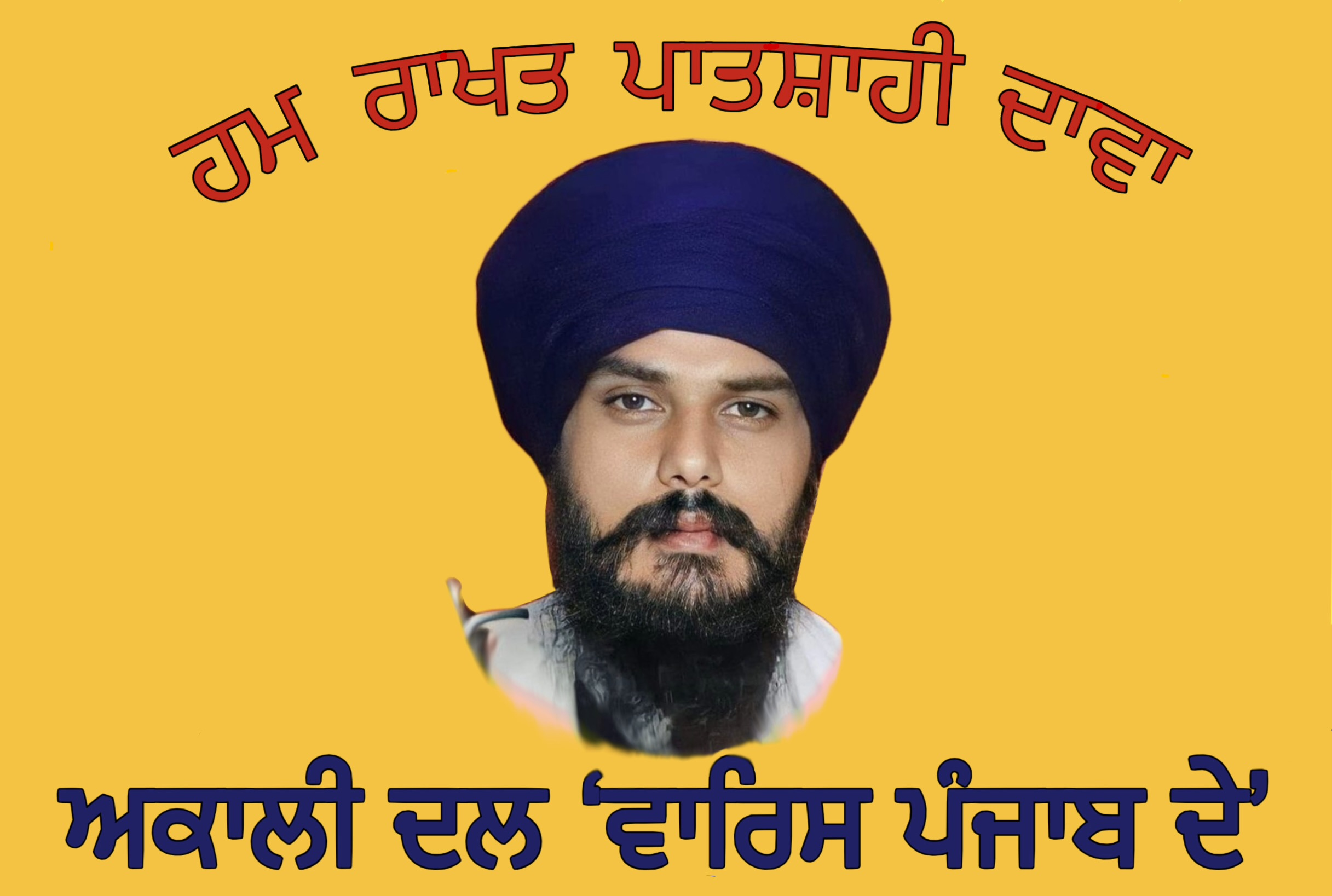

Website
- https://adwpd.org/

Akali Dal (Waris Punjab De) is an Indian unregistered political party formed by the supporters of Amritpal Singh, a Member of the Lok Sabha. It was launched on 14 January 2025 during Mela Maghi at Sri Muktsar Sahib by Sarabjeet Singh Khalsa under the leadership of Amritpal Singh. It is led by a 5-member committee consisting of Bapu Tarsem Singh, Sarabjeet Singh Khalsa, Amarjit Singh, Harbhajan Singh Tur, and Surjit Singh.

== Establishment of Party ==
Amritpal Singh and Sarabjeet Singh Khalsa, the party founders, both contested the 2024 Indian general election from the Khadoor Sahib and Faridkot Lok Sabha constituencies in Punjab, respectively. Both did not contest under any political party and were registered as Independent candidates, although Amritpal Singh received support from the Shiromani Akali Dal (Amritsar), a pro-Khalistani political party. The two candidates contested the election on the basis of approaching major issues of concern, such as tackling the drug crisis in Punjab, the release of Sikh political prisoners, and demanding justice for the desecration of Guru Granth Sahib.

This message successfully resonated with the constituents of the respective legislative districts, as both candidates won the election with large margins, defeating popular contestants and opponents, such as Punjabi actor Karamjit Anmol in Faridkot. Amritpal Singh won in Khadoor Sahib with a margin of 197,120, which was the largest of all 13 constituencies in Punjab. These victories marked a pivotal moment in the political landscape of Punjab, as it was the first time since 1989 Indian general election that any candidates of Khalistani background, apart from Simranjit Singh Mann, were elected to the Lok Sabha, representing dissatisfaction with major political parties.

=== Announcement of Party ===
After the general election, speculations spanning multiple months were appearing, which discussed the possibility of the formation of a political party by Amritpal Singh and Sarabjeet Singh Khalsa, due to their similar circumstances of victory, and the issues of top priority for their supporters. On 29 September 2024, Tarsem Singh, father of MP Amritpal Singh, confirmed the rumours by announcing the establishment of a political party in the near future, at Akal Takht.

On 4 January 2025, Sarabjeet Singh Khalsa and Tarsem Singh announced the preparations for the launch of a new political party, scheduled to be officially launched on 14 January 2025 during Mela Maghi at Sri Muktsar Sahib, at a conference labelled 'Panth Bachao-Punjab Bachao'. The political party was originally planned to be formed under the name "Shiromani Akali Dal (Anandpur Sahib)", but it was announced at the conference that the party will be named 'Akali Dal (Waris Punjab De)', tying it to the social and political organisation Waris Punjab De, run by Amritpal Singh, and founded by Deep Sidhu.

=== Shri Muktsar Sahib Declaration ===
The Shri Muktsar Sahib Declaration is a manifesto containing a list of 15 resolutions that set the foundation of Akali Dal (Waris Punjab De), and laid out a general framework for the party to be structured in accordance to, in the months following its creation. This declaration describes the agenda that the party will work towards communicating to the people of Punjab, and their political objectives, along with the core values that will steer the direction of their campaigns. The declaration was announced and made public on 14 January 2025, at the party’s first political conference, held at Mela Maghi, Sri Muktsar Sahib.

== Presence ==
On 13 April 2025, coinciding with the celebration of Vaisakhi, the party held its second major political conference at Talwandi Sabo, where party leaders shared updates regarding the party’s activities in the last 3 months following its establishment, as well as discussed preparations for the 2027 Punjab election.

In July 2025, the party announced that it would contest the Vidhan Sabha by-election for the constituency of Tarn Taran, which was vacated by the death of MLA Kashmir Singh Sohal. This would mark the party’s first contested election since formation in January 2025. The party stated that a strong 'Panthic' candidate would be nominated to contest the by-election. The party’s candidate for the Tarn Taran by-election was declared on 7 October, 2025, to be Mandeep Singh, the older brother of jailed Sandeep Singh Sunny. Mandeep Singh received endorsement from other Sikh political parties and organizations, including Shiromani Akali Dal (Amritsar) and Shiromani Akali Dal (Punar Surjit) faction led by Giani Harpreet Singh. He positioned in third place in the overall results, being defeated by AAP’s Harmeet Singh Sandhu.

In April 2026, the party formally entered into talks for an alliance with Shiromani Akali Dal (Punar Surjit) for the 2027 Punjab election, with Manpreet Singh Ayali appointed as the conveyor of a coordination committee. On 17 May 2026, the failure of talks between both parties resulted in a dismissal of the alliance proposal.

On 28 August 2026, coinciding with celebrations of Guru Ladho Re Diwas, the party held its annual conference at Baba Bakala, where party leadership shared updates concerning the preparations for the approaching 2027 election and how the campaigning will unfold in the following 3-4 months. The party leadership responded to rumours and allegations stemming from rival parties, and listed campaign promises through the reading of a letter from Amritpal Singh, who stated that the party would release a White paper on the drugs crisis.

=== Protests ===
On 29 July 2026, the party held a major protest in Chandigarh involving the participation of thousands of its leaders, workers, and supporters to demand the release of its leader, Khadoor Sahib MP Amritpal Singh, as well as other Bandi Singhs (Sikh political prisoners). A main goal of the protest was to reach and conduct a Gherao of the residence of Chief Minister Bhagwant Mann. The protestors were met with water cannon and barricade from the police, many of which were breached. An FIR was registered by Chandigarh Police against Manpreet Singh Ayali, Bhaana Sidhu, Lakha Sidhana, as well as a dozen other members of the party. Dead Shiromani Akali Dal MLA Ajaib Singh Mukhmailpur’s name was also included in the list of FIR registrees.

=== Joinings ===
Manpreet Singh Ayali, MLA for Dakha, officially joined the party in June 2026, marking its entrance into Punjab Legislative Assembly. Former MLA Darshan Singh Shivalik was inducted into the party in June 2026 by MLA Manpreet Singh Ayali and Bapu Tarsem Singh. Iqbal Singh Sandhu, a senior secretary of the Shiromani Akali Dal (Badal) joined the party on 21 July 2026. Punjabi actor Rabby Kandola joined the party on 23 July 2026. Former MLA Dalbir Singh Verka joined the party on 3 August 2026.

Prominent Akali-rebel Iqbal Singh Jhundan officially joined the party on 13 August 2026, along with around a dozen other politicians, including former MLA Master Johar Singh. The party had previously entered into an alliance with an Akali faction led by Iqbal Singh Jhundan in July 2026. Former MLA Sukhwinder Singh Aulakh was inducted into the party on 18 August 2026. Independent politician and former 2024 Barnala by-election contestant Gurdeep Batth, as well as singer Harpreet Singh Baba Beli, joined the party on 25 August 2026.

Former ED Deputy Director Niranjan Singh, as well as former DSP Balwinder Singh Sekhon, were inducted into the party on 23 September 2026 in the presence of Tarsem Singh and Manpreet Singh Ayali. However, Niranjan Singh quit the party on 27 September 2026, citing ideological disputes regarding the Constitution of India.

Prominent Punjabi singer and lyricist Gurwinder Singh Gill Raunta was inducted into the party on 3 October 2026. He was later appointed as the constituency-incharge for Rampura Phul on 9 October 2026. Kabaddi player Amba Sur Singh joined the party on 12 November 2026. Darshpreet Singh, the leader of "SATH" organization at Panjab University was inducted into the party by Manpreet Singh Ayali on 13 November 2026.

== Party leadership ==
=== Presidents ===
S. No.	Name	Portrait	Tenure		
1	Amritpal Singh		14 January 2025	Incumbent	1 year, 304 days
Acting	Tarsem Singh		14 January 2025	Incumbent	1 year, 304 days

=== 5 Member Committee ===
Name	Portrait	Roles & Responsibilities
Tarsem Singh		Acting President
Sarabjeet Singh Khalsa		MP Faridkot
Surjit Singh		
Amarjit Singh		Zonal Incharge (Majha)
Harbhajan Singh Tur		Zonal Incharge (Majha)

=== Other notable spokespeople ===
Position	Name	Portrait
Secretary General	Mandeep Singh Sidhu	
Chief Spokesperson	Imaan Singh Khara	
Zonal Incharge (Doaba)	Paramjit Singh Johal	
Zonal Incharge (Malwa-I)	Manpreet Singh Ayali	
Zonal Incharge (Malwa-II)	Jaskaran Singh Kahan Singh Wala	
Zonal Incharge (Malwa-II)	Lakhvir Singh Sidhana	
Major Campaigner	Balwinder Kaur Sandhu	

== Current Assembly members (Note: Akali Dal (Waris Punjab De) is not yet officially registered with ECI, and therefore the members of this party in any assembly are not officially affiliated with it. However, this section is still included in the wiki page for AD (WPD) as it is important to recognize the association of any sitting members with the party.) ==
=== Lok Sabha ===
As of 2026

S.No.	Constituency	Portrait	Name	Lok Sabha
1	Khadoor Sahib		Amritpal Singh	18th
2	Faridkot (SC)		Sarabjeet Singh Khalsa	18th

=== Punjab Assembly ===
S.No.	Constituency	Portrait	Name	Assembly
1	Dakha		Manpreet Singh Ayali	16th

== 2027 Punjab Legislative Assembly election ==
=== Candidates ===
District	No.	Constituency	Candidate
Pathankot	1	Sujanpur	
Pathankot	2	Bhoa	
Pathankot	3	Pathankot	
Gurdaspur	4	Gurdaspur	
Gurdaspur	5	Dina Nagar	
Gurdaspur	6	Qadian	
Gurdaspur	7	Batala	
Gurdaspur	8	Sri Hargobindpur	
Gurdaspur	9	Fatehgarh Churian	
Gurdaspur	10	Dera Baba Nanak	
Amritsar	11	Ajnala	
Amritsar	12	Rajasansi	
Amritsar	13	Majitha	Papalpreet Singh
Amritsar	14	Jandiala Guru	
Amritsar	15	Amritsar North	
Amritsar	16	Amritsar West	
Amritsar	17	Amritsar Central	
Amritsar	18	Amritsar East	
Amritsar	19	Amritsar South	
Amritsar	20	Attari	
Tarn Taran	21	Tarn Taran	
Tarn Taran	22	Khem Karan	
Tarn Taran	23	Patti	
Tarn Taran	24	Khadoor Sahib	
Tarn Taran	25	Baba Bakala	
Kapurthala	26	Bholath	
Kapurthala	27	Kapurthala	
Kapurthala	28	Sultanpur Lodhi	
Kapurthala	29	Phagwara	
Jalandhar	30	Phillaur	
Jalandhar	31	Nakodar	
Jalandhar	32	Shahkot	
Jalandhar	33	Kartarpur	
Jalandhar	34	Jalandhar West	
Jalandhar	35	Jalandhar Central	
Jalandhar	36	Jalandhar North	
Jalandhar	37	Jalandhar Cantonment	
Jalandhar	38	Adampur	
Hoshiarpur	39	Mukerian	
Hoshiarpur	40	Dasuya	
Hoshiarpur	41	Urmar	
Hoshiarpur	42	Sham Chaurasi	
Hoshiarpur	43	Hoshiarpur	
Hoshiarpur	44	Chabbewal	
Hoshiarpur	45	Garhshankar	
S.B.S Nagar	46	Banga	
S.B.S Nagar	47.	Nawan Shahr	
S.B.S Nagar	48.	Balachaur	
Rupnagar	49	Anandpur Sahib	
Rupnagar	50	Rupnagar	
Rupnagar	51	Chamkaur sahib	
S.A.S Nagar	52.	Kharar	
S.A.S Nagar	53.	S.A.S. Nagar	
Fatehgarh	54.	Bassi Pathana	Satwant Singh
Fatehgarh	55.	Fatehgarh Sahib	
Fatehgarh	56.	Amloh	
Ludhiana	57.	Khanna	
Ludhiana	58.	Samrala	
Ludhiana	59.	Sahnewal	
Ludhiana	60.	Ludhiana East	
Ludhiana	61.	Ludhiana South	
Ludhiana	62.	Atam Nagar	
Ludhiana	63.	Ludhiana Central	
Ludhiana	64.	Ludhiana West	
Ludhiana	65.	Ludhiana North	
Ludhiana	66.	Gill	
Ludhiana	67.	Payal	
Ludhiana	68.	Dakha	
Ludhiana	69.	Raikot	
Ludhiana	70.	Jagraon	
Moga	71.	Nihal Singh Wala	
Moga	72.	Bhagha Purana	
Moga	73.	Moga	
Moga	74.	Dharamkot	
Ferozpur	75.	Zira	
Ferozpur	76.	Firozpur City	
Ferozpur	77.	Firozpur Rural	
Ferozpur	78.	Guru Har Sahai	
Fazilka	79.	Jalalabad	
Fazilka	80.	Fazilka	
Fazilka	81.	Abohar	
Fazilka	82.	Balluana	
Sri Muktsar Sahib	83.	Lambi	
Sri Muktsar Sahib	84.	Gidderbaha	
Sri Muktsar Sahib	85.	Malout	
Sri Muktsar Sahib	86.	Muktsar	
Faridkot	87.	Faridkot	
Faridkot	88.	Kotkapura	
Faridkot	89.	Jaitu	
Bathinda	90.	Rampura Phul	
Bathinda	91.	Bhucho Mandi	
Bathinda	92.	Bathinda Urban	
Bathinda	93.	Bathinda Rural	
Bathinda	94.	Talwandi Sabo	
Bathinda	95.	Maur	
Mansa	96.	Mansa	
Mansa	97.	Sardulgarh	
Mansa	98.	Budhlada	
Sangrur	99.	Lehragaga	
Sangrur	100.	Dirba	
Sangrur	101.	Sunam	
Barnala	102.	Bhadaur	
Barnala	103.	Barnala	
Barnala	104.	Mehal Kalan	
Malerkotla	105.	Malerkotla	
Malerkotla	106.	Amargarh	
Sangrur	107.	Dhuri	
Sangrur	108.	Sangrur	
Patiala	109.	Nabha	
Patiala	110.	Patiala Rural	
Patiala	111.	Rajpura	
S.A.S Nagar	112.	Dera Bassi	
Patiala	113.	Ghanaur	
Patiala	114.	Sanour	
Patiala	115.	Patiala	
Patiala	116.	Samana	
Patiala	117.	Shutrana	

=== Results ===
Year	Leader	Seats won	Change in seats	Popular vote	Vote %	Ref.
2027	Amritpal Singh Sandhu	0 / 117	▲			new
