= Urmar Assembly constituency =

Legislative Assembly constituency in Punjab State, India

Coordinates: 31.67°N 75.63°E

Urmar
- Constituency No. 41 for the Punjab Legislative Assembly

Constituency details
- Country: India
- State: Punjab
- District: Hoshiarpur
- Lok Sabha constituency: Hoshiarpur
- Total electors: 183,066
- Reservation: None

Member of Legislative Assembly
- 16th Punjab Legislative Assembly
- Incumbent Jasvir Singh Raja Gill
- Party: Aam Aadmi Party
- Elected year: 2022

Urmar Assembly constituency is one of the 117 Legislative Assembly constituencies of Punjab state in India. It is part of Hoshiarpur district.

== Members of the Legislative Assembly ==
Most successful parties from Urmar Vidhan Sabha
1. INC (2 Times) (66.7%)
2. AAP (1 Time) (33.3%)

Year	Member	Party
2012	Sangat Singh Gilzian	Indian National Congress
2017	Sangat Singh Gilzian	Indian National Congress
2022	Jasvir Singh Raja Gill	Aam Aadmi Party

== Election results ==
=== 2027 ===
Punjab Assembly election, 2027: Urmar
Party	Candidate	Votes	%	±%
AAP	Jasvir Singh Raja Gill			
AD (WPD)				New entry
INC				
BSP				
SAD				New entry
BJP				New entry
NOTA	None of the above			
Majority				
Turnout				

=== 2022 ===
Punjab Assembly election, 2022: Urmar
Party	Candidate	Votes	%	±%
AAP	Jasvir Singh Raja Gill	42,576	34.30	▲8.39
INC	Sangat Singh Gilzian	38,386	30.90	▼10.20
BSP	Lakhwinder Singh	23,191	18.7	▲17.33
SAD(S)	Manjit Singh	10,956	8.80	New entry
SAD(A)	Kuldip Singh	6,890	5.50	▲4.34
NOTA	None of the above	880	0.50	
Majority		4,190	3.35	
Turnout		125,205	68.40	
Registered electors		183,059		
AAP gain from INC		Swing		

=== 2017 ===
Punjab Assembly election, 2017: Urmar
Party	Candidate	Votes	%	±%
INC	Sangat Singh Gilzian	51,477	41.10	▼3.66
SAD	Arbinder Singh Rasulpur	36,523	29.16	▼10.83
AAP	Jasvir Singh Raja Gill	32,445	25.91	New entry
BSP	Gurbakhash Singh	1,720	1.37	▼4.31
SAD(A)	Kuldip Singh	1,454	1.16	▲0.63
NOTA	None of the above	840	0.67	
Majority		14,954	11.90	
Turnout		125,236	71.53	
Registered electors		176,265		
INC hold		Swing		

=== 2012 ===
Punjab Assembly election, 2012: Urmar
Party	Candidate	Votes	%	±%
INC	Sangat Singh Gilzian	51,915	44.76	New entry
SAD	Arbinder Singh Rasulpur	46,386	39.99	New entry
Independent	Jaswinder Singh	7,098	6.12	New entry
BSP	Surjit Lal Paul	6,594	5.68	New entry
Majority		5,529	4.80	
Turnout		115,990	75.44	
Registered electors		152,221		
INC win (new seat)				

== See also ==
- List of constituencies of the Punjab Legislative Assembly
- Hoshiarpur district
