= Moosa Jatt =

2021 Indian Punjabi-language period film by Tru Makers

MoosaJatt
- Directed by: Dilsher Singh & Khushpal Singh
- Written by: Gurinder Dimpy
- Produced by: Rrupaali Gupta
- Starring: Sidhu Moose Wala; Sweetaj Brar
- Cinematography: Soni Singh
- Edited by: Tarun Chouhan
- Music by: The Kidd
- Production companies: Friday Russh Pictures; White Hill Studios
- Distributed by: Friday Russh Motion Pictures
- Release date: 1 October 2021
- Running time: 130 minutes
- Country: India
- Language: Punjabi

Moosa Jatt is a 2021 Indian Punjabi language action film which was written by Gurinder Dimpy, produced by Rrupaali Gupta and directed by Tru Makers. It stars Sidhu Moose Wala and Sweetaj Brar in lead roles. The film was theatrically released on October 8, 2021.

== Cast ==
- Sidhu Moose Wala as ‘‘Moosa’’
- Sweetaj Brar as ‘‘Rani”
- Mahabir Bhullar as “Jang Singh” (Uncle of Moosa)
- Tarsem Paul as “Sangha”
- Bhaana Sidhu as “Bhau”
- Gurinder Dimpy as “Kahan Singh”
- Yaad Grewal as
- Sanju Solanki as “Sham Lal”
- Surinder Bath as “Rehmat Taya”
- Sameep Singh Ranaut as “Moosa”
- Pardeep Brar as “Inspector Brar”
- Harkirat Singh as “Tochi”
- Sukh Dandiwal as “Pastaul”
- Kulveer Mushkabaad as “Pala Singh”
- Manjinder Makha as “Gela”

== Production ==
On November 12, 2020, Sidhu Moosewala and his team announced the film Moosa Jatt through social media and filming began in December 2020. Originally intended for an 18 June 2021 release, it was postponed due to the ongoing COVID-19 pandemic. This was Sidhu Moose Wala's final film before his assassination on 29 May 2022.

== Release ==
The film was met with censorship issues in India, ultimately cancelling its release in India. It was nonetheless released worldwide, including the United States, the United Kingdom, Canada and France. On 1 October 2021, it was granted theatrical distribution in India.

=== Home Media Release ===
The uncut version of the film was released on OTT platform Chaupal on 3 December 2021.

== Soundtrack ==
MoosaJatt

Soundtrack album by The Kidd and Desi Routz
- Released: Sept 2021
- Genre: Feature film soundtrack
- Length: 10:28
- Label: Times Music

On 1 September 2021, The Label Times Music released the first track, "Jailaan", performed by Sidhu Moose Wala and produced by The Kidd. A second single, "Ikk Duje De", was officially released on all platforms on 7 September as a promotional track.

Track listing
No.	Title	Lyrics	Music	Singer(s)	Length
1.	"Jailaan"	Sidhu Moose Wala	The Kidd	Sidhu Moose Wala	2:58
2.	"Ikk Duje De"	Maninder Kailey	Desi Routz	Sweetaj Brar	4:12
3.	"Thapian"	Babbu Brar	The Kidd	Balkar Ankhila, Manjinder Gulshan	03:58
Total length:					10:28
