= Dakha Assembly constituency =

Legislative Assembly constituency in Punjab State, India

Coordinates: 30.86°N 75.69°E

Dakha
- Constituency No. 68 for the Punjab Legislative Assembly

Constituency details
- Country: India
- State: Punjab
- District: Ludhiana
- Lok Sabha constituency: Ludhiana
- Total electors: 187,760 (in 2022)
- Reservation: None

Member of Legislative Assembly
- 16th Punjab Legislative Assembly
- Incumbent Manpreet Singh Ayali
- Party: AD (WPD)
- Elected year: 2019

Dakha Assembly constituency (Sl. No.: 68) is a Punjab Legislative Assembly constituency in Ludhiana district, Punjab state, India. Until 2008, Dakha constituency was reserved for SC candidates. Since 2012 election it was opened to all candidates. Manpreet Singh Ayali is the MLA from Dakha since 2019.

== Members of the Legislative Assembly ==
Most successful parties from Dakha Vidhan Sabha
1. SAD (10 Times) (71.4%)
2. INC(3 Times) (21.4%)
3. AAP (1 Time) (7.14%)

Year	Member	Picture	Party
1967	Jagir Singh		Indian National Congress
1969	Basant Singh		Shiromani Akali Dal
1972	Basant Singh		Shiromani Akali Dal
1977	Charanjit Singh		Shiromani Akali Dal
1980	Basant Singh		Shiromani Akali Dal
1985	Basant Singh		Shiromani Akali Dal
1992	Malkiat Singh Dakha		Indian National Congress
1997	Bikramjit Singh Khalsa		Shiromani Akali Dal
2002	Malkiat Singh Dakha		Indian National Congress
2007	Darshan Singh Shivalik		Shiromani Akali Dal
2012	Manpreet Singh Ayali		Shiromani Akali Dal
2017	Harvinder Singh Phoolka		Aam Aadmi Party
2019^	Manpreet Singh Ayali		Shiromani Akali Dal
2022	Manpreet Singh Ayali		Shiromani Akali Dal

^By-Poll

== Election results ==
=== 2027 ===
Punjab Assembly election, 2027: Dakha
Party	Candidate	Votes	%	±%
AD (WPD)	Manpreet Singh Ayali			New entry
AAP	KNS Kang			
INC				
BSP				
SAD	Jaskaran singh deol			
BJP				New entry
NOTA	None of the above			
Majority				
Turnout				

=== 2022 ===
Punjab Assembly election, 2022: 68. Dakha
Party	Candidate	Votes	%	±%
SAD	Manpreet Singh Ayali	49,909	34.97	▼15.33
INC	Sandeep Singh Sandhu	44,102	30.90	▼8.27
AAP	KNS Kang	42,994	30.12	▲27.99
NOTA	None of the above	1,171	0.82	
Majority		5,807	4.07	
Turnout		142,739	75.73	
Registered electors		187,760		
SAD hold				

=== By election 2019 ===
By-election, 2019: 68. Dakha
Party	Candidate	Votes	%	±%
SAD	Manpreet Singh Ayali	66,297	50.30	▲12.90
INC	Sandeep Singh Sandhu	51,625	39.17	▲19.67
LIP	Sukhdev Singh Chak	8,441	6.40	New entry
AAP	Amandeep Singh Mohie	2,804	2.13	▼38.17
NOTA	None of the above	642		
Majority		14,672		
Turnout		131,798	71.35	
SAD gain from AAP		Swing		

=== 2017 ===
Punjab Assembly election, 2017: 68. Dakha
Party	Candidate	Votes	%	±%
AAP	Harvinder Singh Phoolka	58,923	40.55	New entry
SAD	Manpreet Singh Ayali	54,754	37.68	▼14.51
INC	Major Singh Bhaini	28,571	19.66	▼20.69
NOTA	None of the above	981	0.68	
Majority		4,169	2.87	
Turnout		145,306	80.93	
Registered electors		179,549		
AAP gain from SAD		Swing		

=== 2012 ===
Punjab Assembly election, 2012: 68. Dakha
Party	Candidate	Votes	%	±%
SAD	Manpreet Singh Ayali	72,208	52.19	▲2.99
INC	Jasbir Singh Khangura	55,820	40.35	▼0.65
PPoP	Daljit Singh	8,374	6.05	New entry
BSP	Surinder Singh	1,258	0.91	▼2.59
Majority		16,388	11.8	
Turnout		138,356	84.6	
Registered electors		163,484		
SAD hold		Swing		

=== 2007 ===
Punjab Assembly election, 2007: 54. Dakha
Party	Candidate	Votes	%	±%
SAD	Darshan Singh Shivalik	94,807	49.20	▲12.44
INC	Malkiat Singh Dakha	79,006	41.00	▼3.25
BSP	Parkash Singh Jandiali	6,742	3.50	▼5.20
CPI(M)	Amarjeet Mattu	3,610	1.87	▲0.30
Independent	Harinder Singh Khalsa	3,218	1.67	New entry
Majority		15,801		
Turnout		192,696		
Registered electors				
SAD gain from INC		Swing		

=== 2002 ===
Punjab Legislative Assembly Election, 2002: 55. Dakha
Party	Candidate	Votes	%	±%
INC	Malkiat Singh Dakha	51,570	44.25	▲4.47
SAD	Darshan Singh Shivalik	42,844	36.76	▼15.17
BSP	Mandeep Kaur	10,142	8.70	New entry
SAD(A)	Bikramjit Singh	7,796	6.69	▼0.88
CPI(M)	Sohan Singh	1,829	1.57	New entry
Majority		8,726	7.49	
Turnout		116,551	51.62	
Registered electors				
INC gain from SAD		Swing		

=== 1997 ===
Punjab Legislative Assembly Election, 1997: 55. Dakha
Party	Candidate	Votes	%	±%
SAD	Bikramjit Singh Khalsa	64,605	51.93	New entry
INC	Malkiat Singh Dakha	49,495	39.78	▼26.79
SAD(A)	Jagdish Kaur	9,423	7.57	New entry
Independent	Baldev Singh	624	0.50	New entry
Independent	Anokh Singh	267	0.21	New entry
Majority		15,010	12.06	
Turnout		124,414	60.52	
Registered electors				
SAD gain from INC		Swing		

=== 1992 ===
Punjab Legislative Assembly Election, 1992: 55. Dakha
Party	Candidate	Votes	%	±%
INC	Malkiat Singh Dakha	4,404	66.57	▲32.92
BJP	Ghanaya Lal	1,225	18.52	New entry
BSP	P Lal	987	14.92	New entry
Majority		3,179	48.05	
Turnout		6,616	4.63	
Registered electors				
INC gain from SAD		Swing		

=== 1985 ===
Punjab Legislative Assembly Election, 1985: 55. Dakha
Party	Candidate	Votes	%	±%
SAD	Basant Singh	39,511	56.51	▲4.13
INC	Mohinder Singh	23,529	33.65	▼11.35
CPI(M)	Sohan Singh	5,001	7.15	New entry
Independent	Baldev Singh	1,322	1.89	New entry
Majority		15,982	22.86	
Turnout		69,924	63.74	
Registered electors				
SAD hold		Swing		

=== 1980 ===
Punjab Legislative Assembly Election, 1980: 55. Dakha
Party	Candidate	Votes	%	±%
SAD	Basant Singh	31,560	52.38	▼8.16
INC(I)	Jagjit Singh	27,113	45.00	▲6.72
Independent	Bachan Singh	1,441	2.39	New entry
Majority		4,447	7.38	
Turnout		60,253	58.97	
Registered electors				
SAD hold		Swing		

=== 1977 ===
Punjab Legislative Assembly Election, 1977: 55. Dakha
Party	Candidate	Votes	%	±%
SAD	Charanjit Singh	31,908	60.54	▲8.30
INC	Gurcharan Singh	20,178	38.28	▼9.48
Independent	Dalip Singh	368	0.70	New entry
Majority		11,730	22.25	
Turnout		52,708	58.40	
Registered electors				
SAD hold		Swing		

=== 1972 ===
Punjab Legislative Assembly Election, 1972: 65. Dakha
Party	Candidate	Votes	%	±%
SAD	Basant Singh	25,565	52.24	▼
INC	Harbans Singh Sayan	23,372	47.76	▲
Majority		2,193	4.48	
Turnout		48,937	68.67	
Registered electors				
SAD hold		Swing		

=== 1969 ===
Punjab Legislative Assembly Election, 1969: 65. Dakha
Party	Candidate	Votes	%	±%
SAD	Basant Singh	22,641		▲
INC	Jagir Singh	11,476		▼
Majority		11,165		
Turnout				
Registered electors				
SAD gain from INC		Swing		

=== 1967 ===
Punjab Legislative Assembly Election, 1967: 65. Dakha
Party	Candidate	Votes	%	±%
INC	Jagir Singh	18,060		
Akali Dal (SFS)	Basant Singh	16,903		
Majority		1,157		
Turnout				
Registered electors				
INC hold		Swing		

== See also ==
- List of constituencies of the Punjab Legislative Assembly
- Ludhiana district
