= Sangat Singh Gilzian =

Indian politician from Punjab

Punjab Legislative Assembly
- Incumbent
- Assumed office 2017
- Succeeded by: Arbinder Singh Rasulpur
- Constituency: Urmar

Personal details
- Born: 15 February 1953 (age 73)
- Party: INC
- Profession: Politician

Sangat Singh Gilzian (15 February 1953) is an Indian politician and a member of INC. In 2017, he was elected as the member of the Punjab Legislative Assembly from Urmar.

== Constituency ==
He won the Urmar Assembly Constituency on an INC ticket, he beat the member of the Punjab Legislative Assembly Arbinder Singh Rasulpur of the Shiromani Akali Dal by over 14954 votes. He was Labour Minister in Punjab Government headed by Chief Minister Charanjit Singh Channi.
