= Kuldeep Singh Vaid =

Indian politician and civil servant

Member of Punjab Legislative Assembly
- In office 2017 – Feb 2022
- Preceded by: Darshan Singh Shivalik
- Constituency: Gill

Personal details
- Born: 2 February 1961 (age 65) Ludhiana, Punjab, India
- Party: Indian National Congress
- Spouse: Kamaljit Kaur Vaid
- Children: 3
- Relatives: Buta Singh (uncle); Arvinder Singh Lovely (cousin)
- Education: Panjab University
- Profession: PCS (1992-2007), IAS (2007–2016) and Politician
- As of 18 October, 2020

Kuldeep Singh Vaid is an Indian politician and former IAS officer.

== Early life ==
K.S. Vaid was born to Sardar Gurcharan Singh Vaid and Surjit Kaur Vaid. He did his B.Com. and LLB from Panjab University.

His son, Harkarandeep Singh Vaid is an elected member from Ward 44 in Ludhiana civic elections. He was married to Bhavdeep Kaur and his father-in-law, Jatinderpal Singh is also a PCS officer.

He is a 1992-batch PCS officer who got promoted as an I.A.S. in 2007. He served as D.C. of Moga and Additional Chief Administrator of Greater Ludhiana Area Development Authority (GLADA).

== Disproportionate Assets Charges ==
In March 2023, the Punjab Vigilance Bureau (VB) launched a disproportionate assets (DA) investigation against Kuldeep Singh Vaid, suspecting that he possessed assets beyond what could be justified from his known income. As part of the inquiry, VB teams raided his residence in Sarabha Nagar, Ludhiana, and a nearby café presumably linked to his family.

Following the raid, Vaid was summoned multiple times for questioning. He was grilled for several hours across multiple sessions throughout March and April 2023. VB demanded comprehensive documentation regarding his movable and immovable assets, including bank statements and property records.

During the investigation, authorities found that Vaid had exceeded the permissible limit of liquor bottles at his residence. Specifically, 73 to 90 bottles of Indian and imported liquor (including whiskey, scotch, wine, champagne) were recovered, some intended for sale in Chandigarh only, and all exceeding legal allowances. Consequently, an FIR was registered against him under Sections 61, 1, and 14 of the Punjab Excise Act, citing possession of liquor beyond licensed limits. The incident also involved the VB and local Ludhiana police authorities.

== Positions held ==
He entered politics after resigning from civil services on 30 November 2016.

In 2017 Punjab Legislative Assembly elections he fought from Gill constituency.

He held positions as:

- Member of Committee on Public Accounts and House Committee
- Member of Committee on Local Bodies and Panchayati Raj Institutions
- Member of Committee on Privileges
