= Ayali Khurd =

- Village
- Location in Punjab, India Ayali Khurd (India)
- Coordinates: 30.9121696°N 75.7559539°E
- Country: India
- State: Punjab
- District: Ludhiana
- Tehsil: Ludhiana West

Government
  - Type: Panchayati raj (India)
  - Body: Gram panchayat

Languages
  - Official: Punjabi
  - Other spoken: Hindi
- Time zone: UTC+5:30 (IST)
- Telephone code: 0161
- ISO 3166 code: IN-PB
- Vehicle registration: PB-10
- Website: ludhiana.nic.in

Ayali Khurd is a village located in the Ludhiana West tehsil, of Ludhiana district, Punjab.

== Administration ==
The village is administrated by a Sarpanch who is an elected representative of village as per constitution of India and Panchayati raj (India).

Particulars	Total	Male	Female
Total No. of Houses	1,264		
Population	6,203	3,285	2,918
Child (0–6)	788	420	368
Schedule Caste	2,138	1,140	998
Schedule Tribe	0	0	0
Literacy	82.95%	88.17%	77.10%
Total Workers	1,901	1,676	225
Main Worker	1,834	0	0
Marginal Worker	67	48	19

== Cast ==
The village constitutes 34.47% of Schedule Caste and the village doesn't have any Schedule Tribe population.

== Air travel connectivity ==
The closest airport to the village is Sahnewal Airport.
