= Sucha Ram Ladhar =

Indian politician and civil servant

Sucha Ram Ladhar also known as S. R. Ladhar, is a retired IAS officer and politician from the Punjab. He is a member of the Bhartiya Janata Party.

== Biography ==
=== Early life and education ===
Sucha Ram Ladhar was born to Piara Ram into a Ravidassia family. He pursued higher education in engineering and obtained a Master of Technology (M.Tech) in Highway Engineering from Punjab Engineering College, Chandigarh, in 1985.

=== Bureaucratic career ===
He joined civil services in 1991 and was appointed as Sub-Divisional Magistrate (Ludhiana). Over his career, he held posts such as Additional Deputy Commissioner (Muktsar), Deputy Commissioner of Mansa, Bathinda, Ferozepur, and Sangrur, and Commissioner of Jalandhar and Patiala divisions. He also served in key state-level departments, including Revenue, Home, Transport, Co-operative, Rural & Panchayati Raj, and Planning in Chandigarh.

=== Political career ===
After retirement, Ladhar co-founded the Kiri Kisan Sher-e-Punjab Party with Capt. Chanan Singh Sidhu. This party aimed to represent farmers, farm laborers, and marginalized communities in Punjab, criticizing traditional political players.

In December 2021, his party merged with the Bharatiya Janata Party (BJP), and Ladhar was fielded as the BJP candidate for the Gill Assembly constituency in Ludhiana during the 2022 Punjab Legislative Assembly election. During the campaign, he was reportedly attacked in the Kheri Chameri village area while returning from a poll meeting and sustained upper-body injuries.

== Controversy ==
During his tenure as divisional commissioner in Jalandhar, Ladhar imposed arbitration fees in disputes involving farmers and the National Highway Authority of India (NHAI). He collected approximately ₹1.5 crore but retained a portion rather than remitting it to the government. The Punjab and Haryana High Court directed him to refund the full amount with interest.
