= List of constituencies of the Punjab Legislative Assembly =

Punjab Legislative Assembly
- 16th Legislative Assembly of Punjab

Type
- Type: Unicameral
- Term limits: 5 years

History
- Established: 1952
- Preceded by: Interim East Punjab Assembly
- Seats: 117

Elections
- Voting system: First past the post
- Last election: 2022
- Next election: 2027

Meeting place
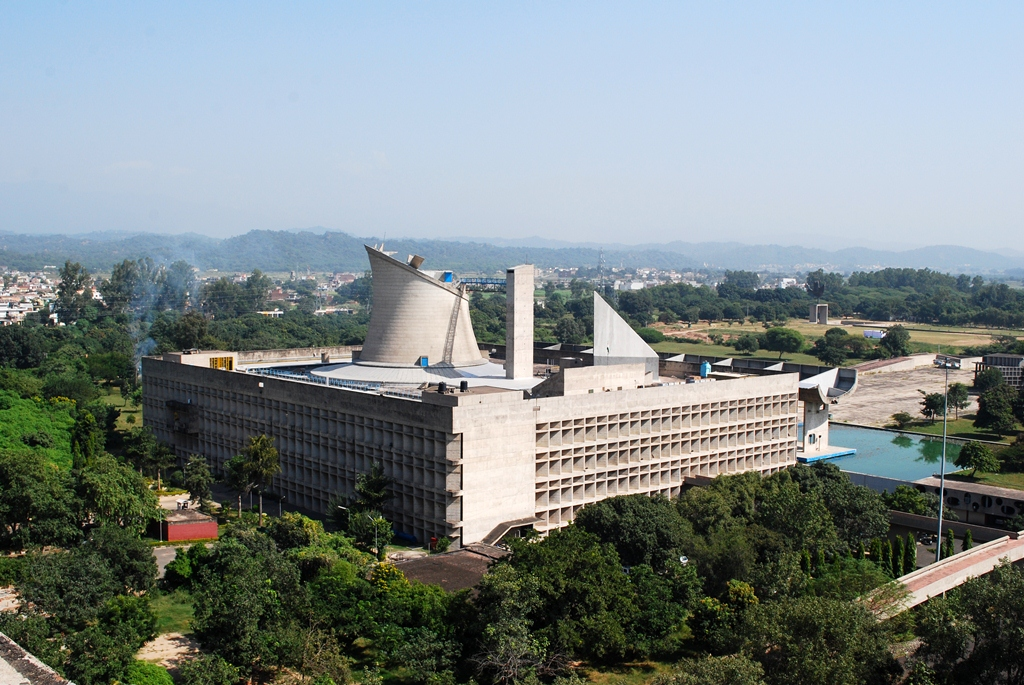
- Palace of Assembly, Chandigarh

Website
- punjabassembly.gov.in

Location of Punjab (highlighted in red) within India

The Punjab Legislative Assembly is the unicameral legislature of Punjab state in North India. The seat of the Legislative Assembly is at Chandigarh, the capital of the state. It is housed within the Chandigarh Capitol Complex, a World Heritage Site designed by Le Corbusier. The term of the assembly is five years, unless it is dissolved early. Punjab is the nineteenth-largest state in India, covering 50,362 km^{2} (19,445 sq mi); and the fifteenth-most populous state with a population of 27.7 million.

Constituency boundaries are periodically redrawn by the delimitation commission which tries to keep them as geographically compact areas, and with due consideration to existing boundaries of administrative units. The latest census is used to draw the boundaries and every assembly constituency has to be completely within a parliamentary constituency. Since 1977, the Punjab Assembly has had 117 single-seat constituencies, each of which directly elects a representative based on a first past the post election.

Since the independence of India, the Scheduled Castes (SC) and Scheduled Tribes (ST) have been given reservation status, guaranteeing political representation, and the Constitution lays down the general principles of positive discrimination for SCs and STs. The 2011 census of India stated that there were no people of any Scheduled Tribes in Punjab, while the Scheduled Castes constitute a significant portion of the population of the state, at 31.9%. The Scheduled Castes have been granted a reservation of 34 seats in the assembly.

== History ==
Changes in the constituencies of the Punjab Legislative Assembly over time
Year	Act/Order	Explanation	Total seats	SC-reserved seats	Election(s)
1950, 1951	Delimitation of Parliamentary and Assembly Constituencies Order, 1951	The Indian Constitution came into effect and new constituencies were created.	105	0	1952
1956	States Reorganisation Act, 1956	Patiala and East Punjab States Union (PEPSU) was merged with Punjab and the number of constituencies of the enlarged state was increased.	121	33	1957
1961	Delimitation of Parliamentary and Assembly Constituencies Order, 1961	There were changes in the number and reservation status of constituencies. Two-member constituencies were abolished.	154	33	1962
1966	Punjab Reorganisation Act, 1966	The new state of Haryana was created from the south-east parts of Punjab. Some districts of Punjab were also merged with Himachal Pradesh.	104	23	1969, 1972
1976	Delimitation of Parliamentary and Assembly Constituencies Order, 1976	There were changes in the number and reservation status of constituencies.	117	29	1977, 1980, 1985, 1992, 1997, 2002, 2007
2008	Delimitation Commission Order, 2007	There were changes in the reservation status and area covered by constituencies.	117	34	2012, 2017, 2022

== Constituencies ==
Constituencies of the Punjab Legislative Assembly

The constituencies of the Punjab Legislative Assembly were last delimited in 2008.

Reservation
Scheduled Castes (SC)

Constituencies of the Punjab Legislative Assembly
#	Constituency name	Reserved for (SC/None)	District	Lok Sabha constituency	Electorate (2022)
1	Sujanpur	None	Pathankot	Gurdaspur	167,230
2	Bhoa	SC	Pathankot	Gurdaspur	182,915
3	Pathankot	None	Pathankot	Gurdaspur	152,519
4	Gurdaspur	None	Gurdaspur	Gurdaspur	169,628
5	Dina Nagar	SC	Gurdaspur	Gurdaspur	192,562
6	Qadian	None	Gurdaspur	Gurdaspur	181,907
7	Batala	None	Gurdaspur	Gurdaspur	188,862
8	Sri Hargobindpur	SC	Gurdaspur	Hoshiarpur	178,734
9	Fatehgarh Churian	None	Gurdaspur	Gurdaspur	175,730
10	Dera Baba Nanak	None	Gurdaspur	Gurdaspur	194,613
11	Ajnala	None	Amritsar	Amritsar	157,161
12	Raja Sansi	None	Amritsar	Amritsar	177,713
13	Majitha	None	Amritsar	Amritsar	166,136
14	Jandiala	SC	Amritsar	Khadoor Sahib	180,674
15	Amritsar North	None	Amritsar	Amritsar	202,095
16	Amritsar West	SC	Amritsar	Amritsar	214,073
17	Amritsar Central	None	Amritsar	Amritsar	147,058
18	Amritsar East	None	Amritsar	Amritsar	168,013
19	Amritsar South	None	Amritsar	Amritsar	177,605
20	Attari	SC	Amritsar	Amritsar	189,475
21	Tarn Taran	None	Tarn Taran	Khadoor Sahib	196,866
22	Khem Karan	None	Tarn Taran	Khadoor Sahib	216,090
23	Patti	None	Tarn Taran	Khadoor Sahib	202,155
24	Khadoor Sahib	None	Tarn Taran	Khadoor Sahib	201,328
25	Baba Bakala	SC	Tarn Taran	Khadoor Sahib	199,929
26	Bholath	None	Kapurthala	Hoshiarpur	136,413
27	Kapurthala	None	Kapurthala	Khadoor Sahib	149,885
28	Sultanpur Lodhi	None	Kapurthala	Khadoor Sahib	148,094
29	Phagwara	SC	Kapurthala	Hoshiarpur	192,867
30	Phillaur	SC	Jalandhar	Jalandhar	207,149
31	Nakodar	None	Jalandhar	Jalandhar	194,824
32	Shahkot	None	Jalandhar	Jalandhar	181,946
33	Kartarpur	SC	Jalandhar	Jalandhar	184,515
34	Jalandhar West	SC	Jalandhar	Jalandhar	171,632
35	Jalandhar Central	None	Jalandhar	Jalandhar	174,003
36	Jalandhar North	None	Jalandhar	Jalandhar	192,058
37	Jalandhar Cantt	None	Jalandhar	Jalandhar	193,666
38	Adampur	SC	Jalandhar	Jalandhar	167,424
39	Mukerian	None	Hoshiarpur	Hoshiarpur	202,924
40	Dasuya	None	Hoshiarpur	Hoshiarpur	197,021
41	Urmar	None	Hoshiarpur	Hoshiarpur	181,007
42	Sham Chaurasi	SC	Hoshiarpur	Hoshiarpur	177,269
43	Hoshiarpur	None	Hoshiarpur	Hoshiarpur	192,794
44	Chabbewal	SC	Hoshiarpur	Hoshiarpur	161,535
45	Garhshankar	None	Hoshiarpur	Anandpur Sahib	175,287
46	Banga	SC	S.B.S. Nagar	Anandpur Sahib	165,283
47	Nawan Shahr	None	S.B.S. Nagar	Anandpur Sahib	177,231
48	Balachaur	None	S.B.S. Nagar	Anandpur Sahib	155,145
49	Anandpur Sahib	None	Rupnagar	Anandpur Sahib	191,727
50	Rupnagar	None	Rupnagar	Anandpur Sahib	183,115
51	Chamkaur Sahib	SC	Rupnagar	Anandpur Sahib	197,330
52	Kharar	None	Mohali	Anandpur Sahib	266,514
53	S.A.S. Nagar	None	Mohali	Anandpur Sahib	238,998
54	Bassi Pathana	SC	Fatehgarh Sahib	Fatehgarh Sahib	149,248
55	Fatehgarh Sahib	None	Fatehgarh Sahib	Fatehgarh Sahib	161,754
56	Amloh	None	Fatehgarh Sahib	Fatehgarh Sahib	144,482
57	Khanna	None	Ludhiana	Fatehgarh Sahib	171,622
58	Samrala	None	Ludhiana	Fatehgarh Sahib	175,822
59	Sahnewal	None	Ludhiana	Fatehgarh Sahib	265,097
60	Ludhiana East	None	Ludhiana	Ludhiana	217,728
61	Ludhiana South	None	Ludhiana	Ludhiana	178,167
62	Atam Nagar	None	Ludhiana	Ludhiana	170,654
63	Ludhiana Central	None	Ludhiana	Ludhiana	158,931
64	Ludhiana West	None	Ludhiana	Ludhiana	182,455
65	Ludhiana North	None	Ludhiana	Ludhiana	205,063
66	Gill	SC	Ludhiana	Ludhiana	273,104
67	Payal	SC	Ludhiana	Fatehgarh Sahib	165,608
68	Dakha	None	Ludhiana	Ludhiana	187,760
69	Raikot	SC	Ludhiana	Fatehgarh Sahib	156,301
70	Jagraon	SC	Ludhiana	Ludhiana	184,819
71	Nihal Singhwala	SC	Moga	Faridkot	197,869
72	Bhagha Purana	None	Moga	Faridkot	172,120
73	Moga	None	Moga	Faridkot	203,541
74	Dharamkot	None	Moga	Faridkot	181,612
75	Zira	None	Firozpur	Khadoor Sahib	187,300
76	Firozpur City	None	Firozpur	Firozpur	172,957
77	Firozpur Rural	SC	Firozpur	Firozpur	195,975
78	Guru Har Sahai	None	Firozpur	Firozpur	172,641
79	Jalalabad	None	Fazilka	Firozpur	213,416
80	Fazilka	None	Fazilka	Firozpur	177,520
81	Abohar	None	Fazilka	Firozpur	178,416
82	Balluana	SC	Fazilka	Firozpur	183,929
83	Lambi	None	Sri Muktsar Sahib	Bathinda	165,263
84	Gidderbaha	None	Sri Muktsar Sahib	Faridkot	167,228
85	Malout	SC	Sri Muktsar Sahib	Firozpur	176,573
86	Muktsar	None	Sri Muktsar Sahib	Firozpur	188,889
87	Faridkot	None	Faridkot	Faridkot	169,823
88	Kotkapura	None	Faridkot	Faridkot	159,646
89	Jaitu	SC	Faridkot	Faridkot	151,056
90	Rampura Phul	None	Bathinda	Faridkot	169,859
91	Bhucho Mandi	SC	Bathinda	Bathinda	184,785
92	Bathinda Urban	None	Bathinda	Bathinda	229,525
93	Bathinda Rural	SC	Bathinda	Bathinda	158,082
94	Talwandi Sabo	None	Bathinda	Bathinda	156,336
95	Maur	None	Bathinda	Bathinda	167,547
96	Mansa	None	Mansa	Bathinda	218,339
97	Sardulgarh	None	Mansa	Bathinda	181,679
98	Budhlada	SC	Mansa	Bathinda	195,170
99	Lehra	None	Sangrur	Sangrur	172,109
100	Dirba	SC	Sangrur	Sangrur	182,695
101	Sunam	None	Sangrur	Sangrur	196,136
102	Bhadaur	SC	Barnala	Sangrur	157,809
103	Barnala	None	Barnala	Sangrur	182,502
104	Mehal Kalan	SC	Barnala	Sangrur	160,348
105	Malerkotla	None	Malerkotla	Sangrur	159,900
106	Amargarh	None	Malerkotla	Fatehgarh Sahib	165,909
107	Dhuri	None	Sangrur	Sangrur	165,053
108	Sangrur	None	Sangrur	Sangrur	189,838
109	Nabha	SC	Patiala	Patiala	184,623
110	Patiala Rural	None	Patiala	Patiala	225,639
111	Rajpura	None	Patiala	Patiala	182,228
112	Dera Bassi	None	Mohali	Patiala	287,622
113	Ghanaur	None	Patiala	Patiala	164,546
114	Sanour	None	Patiala	Patiala	222,969
115	Patiala	None	Patiala	Patiala	161,399
116	Samana	None	Patiala	Patiala	192,473
117	Shutrana	SC	Patiala	Patiala	181,568

== See also ==
- 16th Punjab Assembly
- List of constituencies of the Punjab Provincial Assembly (Pakistan)
- List of constituencies of the Haryana Legislative Assembly
