= Punjab Assembly Committee on Privileges =

Indian Legislative committee

Committee on Privileges
Committee of the House
- 16th Punjab Assembly
- State: Punjab

Leadership
- Chaiperson: Kulwant Singh Pandori
- Chairperson party: Aam Aadmi Party
- Appointer: Punjab Assembly speaker

Structure
- Seats: 12
- Political Parties: AAP (9); INC (2); SAD (1)
- Election criteria: The members are elected every year from amongst its members of house according to the principle of proportional representation.
- Tenure: 1 Year

Jurisdiction
- Purpose: Legislative oversight of the Privileges

Rules & Procedure
- Applicable rules: Article 208 of the Constitution of India section 32 of the States Reorganisation Act, 1956; Rules 232(1) and 2(b) of Rules of Procedure and Conduct of Business in Punjab Legislative Assembly

Punjab Assembly Committee on Privileges of Punjab Legislative Assembly is constituted annually for a one-year period from among the members of the Assembly.

== Functions ==
The functions of the committee are explained below.

Each House of Legislature collectively, and its members individually, enjoy certain privileges i.e., certain rights and immunities without which the House and its members cannot discharge the functions entrusted to them by the Constitution. The object of these privileges is to safeguard the freedom, the authority and the dignity of the House, its Committees and Members. Where there is any question of an alleged breach of privilege, the matter is referred by the House to its Committee of Privileges for examination, investigation and report.

== Appointment ==
The speaker appoints the committee and its members every year for a one-year term according to the powers conferred by Article 208 of the Constitution of India read with section 32 of the States Reorganisation Act, 1956 (37 of 1956), and in pursuance of Rules 232(1) and 2(b) of the Rules of Procedure and Conduct of Business in the Punjab Legislative Assembly.

== Members ==
For the one-year period starting May 2022, the Committee on Privileges of 16th Punjab Assembly had following members:

Committee on Privileges (2022–23)
Sr. No.	Name	Post	Party
1	Kulwant Singh Pandori	Chairperson	AAP
2	Amit Rattan Kotfatta	Member	AAP
3	Aruna Chaudhary	Member	INC
4	Dr. Balbir Singh	Member	AAP
5	Dr. Charanjit Singh	Member	AAP
6	Fauja Singh Sarari	Member	AAP
7	Hardev Singh Laddi	Member	INC
8	Kashmir Singh Sohal	Member	AAP
9	Naresh Kataria	Member	AAP
10	Narinder Kaur Bharaj	Member	AAP
11	Sukhwinder Kumar Sukhi	Member	SAD
12	Tarunpreet Singh Sond	Member	AAP

== Chairpersons ==
Tenure	Terms	Name	Political party
2021-22	1	Kushaldeep Singh Dhillon	Indian National Congress
2022-23	1	Kulwant Singh Pandori	Aam Aadmi Party

== Previous members ==
For the one-year period before May 2022, the Committee on Privileges of 15th Punjab Assembly had following members:

=== 2021–22 ===
Committee on Privileges (2021–22)
Sr. No.	Name	Post	Party
1	Kushaldeep Singh Kiki Dhillon	Chairperson	INC
2	Amarinder Singh Raja Warring	Member	INC
3	Baljinder Kaur	Member	AAP
4	Budh Ram	Member	INC
5	Darshan Lal	Member	INC
6	Dharambir Agnihotri	Member	INC
7	Hardev Singh Laddi	Member	INC
8	Harinder Pal Singh Chandumajra	Member	INC
9	Kuldeep Singh Vaid (Bulara)	Member	INC
10	Pargat Singh Powar	Member	INC
11	Raminder Singh Awla	Member	INC
12	Sukhwinder Kumar	Member	INC

=== 2020–21 ===
Committee on Privileges (2020–21)
Sr. No.	Name	Post	Party
1	Kushaldeep Singh Kiki Dhillon	Chairperson	INC
2	Amarinder Singh Raja Warring	Member	INC
3	Baljinder Kaur	Member	AAP
4	Budh Ram	Member	INC
5	Darshan Lal	Member	INC
6	Dharambir Agnihotri	Member	INC
7	Fatehjang Singh Bajwa	Member	INC
8	Kuldeep Singh Vaid (Bulara)	Member	INC
9	Harinderpal Singh Chandumajra	Member	INC
10	Pargat Singh Powar	Member	INC
11	Raminder Singh Awla	Member	INC
12	Sukhwinder Kumar	Member	INC

=== 2019–20 ===
Committee on Privileges (2019–20)
Sr. No.	Name	Post	Party
1	Kushaldeep Singh Kiki Dhillon	Chairperson	INC
2	Amarinder Singh Raja Warring	Member	INC
3	Amarjit Singh Sandoa	Member	INC
4	Avtar Singh Junior	Member	INC
5	Darshan Lal	Member	INC
6	Dharambir Agnihotri	Member	INC
7	Fatehjang Singh Bajwa	Member	INC
8	Jagdev Singh	Member	INC
9	Kuldeep Singh Vaid (Bulara)	Member	INC
10	Pargat Singh	Member	INC
11	Pawan Kumar Tinu	Member	INC
12	Sukhwinder Kumar	Member	INC

=== 2018–19 ===
Committee on Privileges (2018–19)
Sr. No.	Name	Post	Party
1	Kushaldeep Singh Kiki Dhillon	Chairperson	INC
2	Amarinder Singh Raja Warring	Member	INC
3	Avtar Singh Junior	Member	INC
4	Dharambir Agnihotri	Member	INC
5	Fatehjang Singh Bajwa	Member	INC
6	Jagdev Singh	Member	INC
7	Kuldeep Singh Vaid (Bulara)	Member	INC
8	Pargat Singh	Member	INC
9	Pawan Kumar Tinu	Member	INC
10	Miss Rupinder Kaur Ruby	Member	INC
11	Sukhwinder Kumar	Member	INC
12	Tarsem Singh D.C.	Member	INC

=== 2017–18 ===
Committee on Privileges (2017–18)
Sr. No.	Name	Post	Party
1	Sukhjinder Singh Randhawa	Chairperson	INC
2	Angad Singh	Member	INC
3	Baldev Singh	Member	INC
4	Lakhbir Singh Lodhinangal	Member	INC
5	Nathu Ram	Member	INC
6	Pargat Singh Powar	Member	INC
7	Pawan Kumar Tinu	Member	INC
8	Pritam Singh Kotbhai	Member	INC
9	Ramanjit Singh Sikki	Member	INC
10	Miss Rupinder Kaur Ruby	Member	INC
11	Sunder Sham Arora	Member	INC
12	Tarsem Singh D.C.	Member	INC
