= 16th Punjab Assembly =

Current Legislative Assembly since 2022

16th Punjab Legislative Assembly

Type
- Type: Unicameral

History
- Established: 17 March 2022
- Preceded by: 15th Punjab Legislative Assembly

Leadership
- Governor: Gulab Chand Kataria since 31 August 2021
- Speaker: Kultar Singh Sandhwan, AAP since 21 March 2022
- Deputy Speaker: Jai Krishan Singh, AAP since 30 June 2022
- Leader of the House (Chief Minister): Bhagwant Mann, AAP since 16 March 2022
- Deputy Leader of the House (Cabinet Minister): Harpal Singh Cheema, AAP since April 2022
- Minister of Legislative Affairs: Balkar Singh, AAP since 31 May 2023
- Leader of the Opposition: Partap Singh Bajwa, INC since 9 April 2022

Structure
- Seats: 117
- Political groups: Government (94): AAP (94); Official Opposition (16): INC (16); Other opposition (7): SAD (2); BJP (2); IND (1); BSP (1)
- Length of term: 5 years

Elections
- Voting system: First-past-the-post
- Last election: 20 February 2022
- Next election: February 2027 or earlier

Meeting place
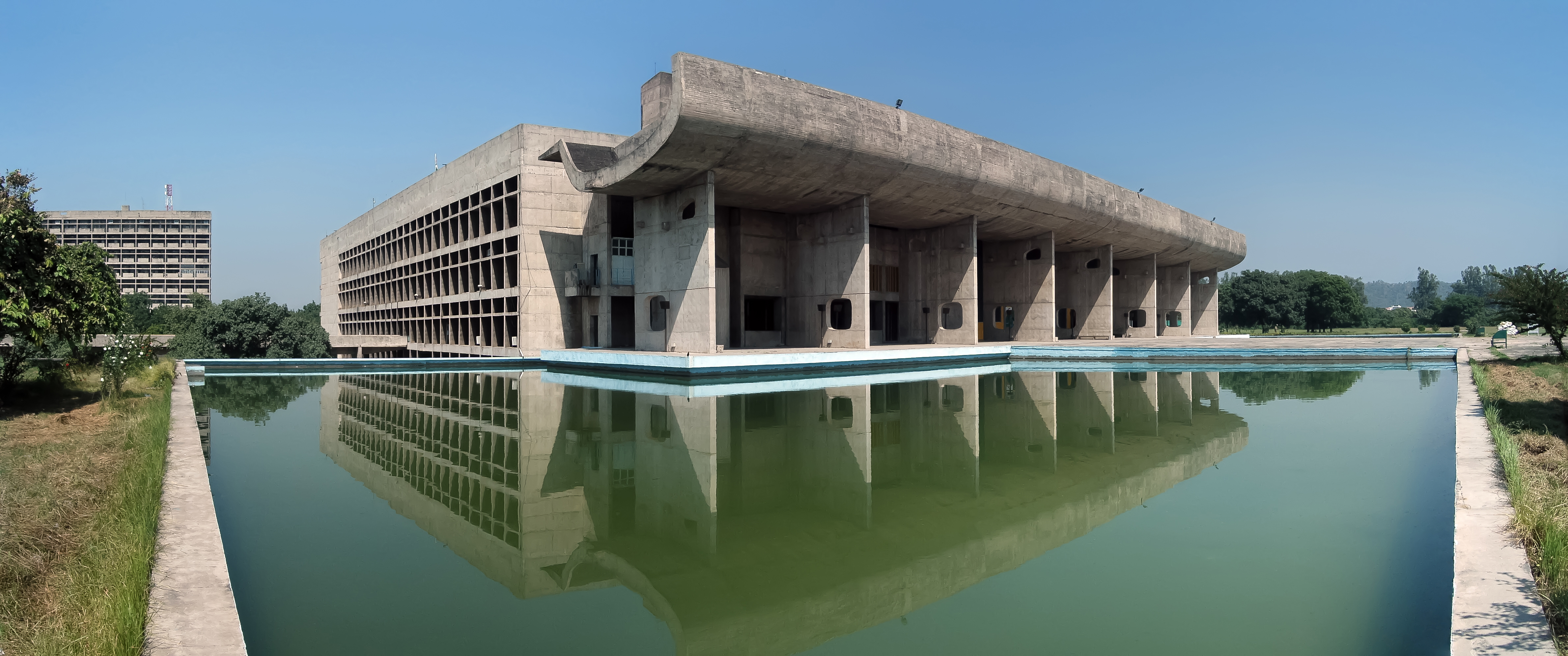
- Palace of Assembly, Chandigarh, India

Website
- Punjab Legislative Assembly

Constitution
- Constitution of India

Election for the Sixteenth Legislative Assembly was held in the Indian state of Punjab. Polling was done on 20 February 2022 to elect the 117 members of the Punjab Legislative Assembly. The counting of votes declaration of results was done on 10 March 2022. The Fifteenth Punjab assembly was dissolved on 11 March 2022. The dissolution was necessitated after the results of the election was declared on 10 March. In the Sixteenth Punjab Legislative Assembly, 94 members of the ruling Aam Aadmi Party form the treasury benches. The main opposition party in the assembly is Indian National Congress with 14 seats. The other parties which are in opposition are the Shiromani Akali Dal, the Bharatiya Janata Party, the Bahujan Samaj Party and independents. AAP MLA, Kultar Singh Sandhwan was announced as the speaker of the assembly.

Incumbent Chief Minister Bhagwant Mann took the oath of office on 16 March at Khatkar Kalan, the ancestral village of Bhagat Singh. Inderbir Singh Nijjar took the oath as pro tem Speaker. On 17 March Nijjar administered the oath of office to all the 117 legislators of the Sixteenth Punjab Legislative assembly. Other 10 cabinet ministers of the Mann ministry, took oath on 19 March.

On 22 June 2022, Speaker Kultar Singh Sandhwan announced that the legislators will get answers on all issues that they raise during the Assembly debates. The answers would be provided during the Zero Hour. This was done for the first time in the history of Punjab Assembly.

== Leaders ==
Title	Name	Portrait	Since
Constitutional Posts
Governor	Gulab Chand Kataria		30 July 2024
Speaker	Kultar Singh Sandhwan		21 March 2022
Deputy speaker	Jai Krishan Singh		30 June 2022
Leader of the House (Chief Minister)	Bhagwant Mann		16 March 2022
Leader of Opposition	Pratap Singh Bajwa		9 April 2022
Political posts
Leader of AAP legislature party	Bhagwant Mann		16 March 2022
Leader of INC legislature party	Pratap Singh Bajwa		9 April 2022
Leader of SAD legislature party	Ganieve Kaur Majithia		June 2026
Leader of AD (WPD) legislature party	Manpreet Singh Ayali		April 2022
Leader of BJP legislature party	Ashwani Kumar Sharma		April 2022
Leader of BSP legislature party	Nachhatar Pal		April 2022

== Committees ==
List of committees and chairpersons for the term 2022–2023.

Committee	Chairperson	Party or Organization
Committee on Local Bodies	Jagroop Singh Gill	Aam Aadmi Party
Committee on Public Accounts	Sukhbinder Singh Sarkaria	Indian National Congress
Committee on Estimates	Aman Arora	Aam Aadmi Party
Committee on Public Undertakings	Budh Ram	Aam Aadmi Party
Committee on Welfare of Scheduled Castes, Scheduled Tribes and Backward Classes	Manjit Singh Bilaspur	Aam Aadmi Party
Committee on Privileges	Kulwant Singh Pandori	Aam Aadmi Party
Committee on Government Assurances	Kunwar Vijay Pratap Singh	Aam Aadmi Party
Committee on Local Bodies	Jagroop Singh Gill	Aam Aadmi Party
Committee on Panchayati Raj Institutions	Gurmeet Singh Khudian	Aam Aadmi Party
Committee on Subordinate Legislation	Barinder Kumar Goyal Vakeel	Aam Aadmi Party
Committee on Papers Laid/to be Laid on the Table and Library	Jagdeep Kamboj Goldy	Aam Aadmi Party
Committee on Petitions	Mohammad Jamil Ur Rahman	Aam Aadmi Party
House Committee	Jai Krishan Singh; Deputy speaker (Ex-Officio Chairperson)	Aam Aadmi Party
Committee on Questions & References	Baljinder Kaur	Aam Aadmi Party
Press Gallery Committee	Naresh Sharma	Punjab Kesari
Committee on Co-operation and its allied activities	Sarvjit Kaur Manuke	Aam Aadmi Party
Committee on Agriculture and its allied activities	Gurpreet Singh Banawali	Aam Aadmi Party

== Composition ==
Seat Share
1. AAP - 94 (80.8%)
2. INC - 16 (13.9%)
3. SAD - 2 (1.80%)
4. BJP - 2 (1.80%)
5. BSP - 1 (0.90%)
6. IND - 1 (0.90%)

=== By alliance and party ===
Party	Seats		Legislative Party Leader	Bench	
Party	Won	Change (Note: As compare with previous result of 2017)	Legislative Party Leader	Bench	
AAP	92	▲72	Bhagwant Singh Mann	94	Government
INC	18	▼59	Partap Singh Bajwa	16	Main Opposition
SAD	3	▼12	Manpreet Singh Ayali	7	Other Opposition
BJP	2	▼1	Ashwani Kumar Sharma	7	Other Opposition
BSP	1	▲1	Nachhatar Pal	7	Other Opposition
IND	1	▲1	Rana Inder Partap Singh	7	Other Opposition
Total	117			117	

=== By constituency ===
District	No.	Constituency	Name	Party	Remarks
Pathankot	1	Sujanpur	Naresh Puri	INC	
Pathankot	2	Bhoa (SC)	Lal Chand Kataruchakk	AAP	
Pathankot	3	Pathankot	Ashwani Kumar Sharma	BJP	
Gurdaspur	4	Gurdaspur	Barindermeet Singh Pahra	INC	
Gurdaspur	5	Dina Nagar (SC)	Aruna Chaudhary	INC	Dy. Leader of Opposition
Gurdaspur	6	Qadian	Partap Singh Bajwa	INC	Leader of the Opposition
Gurdaspur	7	Batala	Amansher Singh (Shery Kalsi)	AAP	
Gurdaspur	8	Sri Hargobindpur (SC)	Amarpal Singh	AAP	
Gurdaspur	9	Fatehgarh Churian	Tripat Rajinder Singh Bajwa	INC	
Gurdaspur	10	Dera Baba Nanak	Sukhjinder Singh Randhawa	INC	Elected to 18th Lok Sabha in June 2024
Gurdaspur	10	Dera Baba Nanak	Gurdeep Singh Randhawa	AAP	
Amritsar	11	Ajnala	Kuldip Singh Dhaliwal	AAP	
Amritsar	12	Rajasansi	Sukhbinder Singh Sarkaria	INC	
Amritsar	13	Majitha	Ganieve Kaur Majithia	SAD	
Amritsar	14	Jandiala (SC)	Harbhajan Singh E.T.O.	AAP	
Amritsar	15	Amritsar North	Kunwar Vijay Pratap Singh	AAP	
Amritsar	16	Amritsar West (SC)	Jasbir Singh Sandhu	AAP	
Amritsar	17	Amritsar Central	Ajay Gupta	AAP	
Amritsar	18	Amritsar East	Jeevan Jyot Kaur	AAP	
Amritsar	19	Amritsar South	Inderbir Singh Nijjar	AAP	
Amritsar	20	Attari (SC)	Jaswinder Singh	AAP	
Tarn Taran	21	Tarn Taran	Harmeet Singh Sandhu	AAP	
Tarn Taran	22	Khemkaran	Sarvan Singh Dhun	AAP	
Tarn Taran	23	Patti	Laljit Singh Bhullar	AAP	
Tarn Taran	24	Khadoor Sahib	Manjinder Singh Lalpura	AAP	
Amritsar	25	Baba Bakala (SC)	Dalbir Singh Tong	AAP	
Kapurthala	26	Bholath	Sukhpal Singh Khaira	INC	
Kapurthala	27	Kapurthala	Rana Gurjeet Singh	INC	
Kapurthala	28	Sultanpur Lodhi	Rana Inder Pratap Singh	IND	
Kapurthala	29	Phagwara (SC)	Balwinder Singh Dhaliwal	INC	
Jalandhar	30	Phillaur (SC)	Vikramjit Singh Chaudhary	INC	
Jalandhar	30	Phillaur (SC)	Vikramjit Singh Chaudhary	IND	Suspended by INC in April 2024.
Jalandhar	31	Nakodar	Inderjit Kaur Mann	AAP	
Jalandhar	32	Shahkot	Hardev Singh Laddi	INC	
Jalandhar	33	Kartarpur (SC)	Balkar Singh	AAP	
Jalandhar	34	Jalandhar West (SC)	Sheetal Angural	AAP	
Jalandhar	34	Jalandhar West (SC)	Mohinder Pal Bhagat	AAP	
Jalandhar	35	Jalandhar Central	Raman Arora	AAP	
Jalandhar	36	Jalandhar North	Avtar Singh Junior	INC	
Jalandhar	37	Jalandhar Cantonment	Pargat Singh	INC	
Jalandhar	38	Adampur (SC)	Sukhwinder Singh Kotli	INC	
Hoshiarpur	39	Mukerian	Jangi Lal Mahajan	BJP	
Hoshiarpur	40	Dasuya	Karambir Singh Ghuman	AAP	
Hoshiarpur	41	Urmar	Jasvir Singh Raja Gill	AAP	
Hoshiarpur	42	Sham Chaurasi (SC)	Ravjot Singh	AAP	Minister of Legislative Affairs
Hoshiarpur	43	Hoshiarpur	Bram Shanker	AAP	
Hoshiarpur	44	Chabbewal (SC)	Raj Kumar Chabbewal	INC	Elected to 18th Lok Sabha in June 2024
Hoshiarpur	44	Chabbewal (SC)	Ishank Kumar	AAP	
Hoshiarpur	45	Garhshankar	Jai Krishan Singh	AAP	Dy. Speaker
Shaheed Bhagat Singh Nagar	46	Banga (SC)	Sukhwinder Kumar	AAP	Defected from SAD to AAP
Shaheed Bhagat Singh Nagar	47	Nawan Shahr	Nachhatar Pal	BSP	
Shaheed Bhagat Singh Nagar	48	Balachaur	Santosh Katariaa	AAP	
Rupnagar	49	Anandpur Sahib	Harjot Singh Bains	AAP	
Rupnagar	50	Rupnagar	Dinesh Chadha	AAP	
Rupnagar	51	Chamkaur Sahib (SC)	Dr Charanjit Singh	AAP	
Sahibzada Ajit Singh Nagar	52	Kharar	Anmol Gagan Maan	AAP	
Sahibzada Ajit Singh Nagar	53	S.A.S. Nagar	Kulwant Singh	AAP	
Fatehgarh Sahib	54	Bassi Pathana (SC)	Rupinder Singh	AAP	
Fatehgarh Sahib	55	Fatehgarh Sahib	Lakhbir Singh Rai	AAP	
Fatehgarh Sahib	56	Amloh	Gurinder Singh Garry	AAP	
Ludhiana	57	Khanna	Tarunpreet Singh Sond	AAP	
Ludhiana	58	Samrala	Jagtar Singh	AAP	
Ludhiana	59	Sahnewal	Hardeep Singh Mundian	AAP	
Ludhiana	60	Ludhiana East	Daljit Singh Grewal	AAP	
Ludhiana	61	Ludhiana South	Rajinder Pal Kaur Chhina	AAP	
Ludhiana	62	Atam Nagar	Kulwant Singh Sidhu	AAP	
Ludhiana	63	Ludhiana Central	Ashok Prashar Pappi	AAP	
Ludhiana	64	Ludhiana West	Sanjeev Arora	AAP	
Ludhiana	65	Ludhiana North	Madan Lal Bagga	AAP	
Ludhiana	66	Gill (SC)	Jiwan Singh Sangowal	AAP	
Ludhiana	67	Payal (SC)	Manwinder Singh Gyaspura	AAP	
Ludhiana	68	Dakha	Manpreet Singh Ayali	AD (WPD)	Joined AD(WPD) from SAD.
Ludhiana	69	Raikot (SC)	Hakam Singh Thekedar	AAP	
Ludhiana	70	Jagraon (SC)	Saravjit Kaur Manuke	AAP	
Moga	71	Nihal Singh Wala (SC)	Manjit Singh Bilaspur	AAP	
Moga	72	Bhagha Purana	Amritpal Singh Sukhanand	AAP	
Moga	73	Moga	Amandeep Kaur Arora	AAP	
Moga	74	Dharamkot	Devinder Singh Laddi Dhos	AAP	
Ferozpur	75	Zira	Naresh Kataria	AAP	
Ferozpur	76	Firozpur City	Ranveer Singh Bhullar	AAP	
Ferozpur	77	Firozpur Rural (SC)	Rajnish Dahiya	AAP	
Ferozpur	78	Guru Har Sahai	Fauja Singh Sarari	AAP	
Fazilka	79	Jalalabad	Jagdeep Kamboj Goldy	AAP	
Fazilka	80	Fazilka	Narinderpal Singh Sawna	AAP	
Fazilka	81	Abohar	Sandeep Jakhar	INC	
Fazilka	81	Abohar	Sandeep Jakhar	IND	Suspended by INC in August 2023.
Fazilka	82	Balluana (SC)	Amandeep Singh ‘Goldy’ Musafir	AAP	
Sri Muktsar Sahib	83	Lambi	Gurmeet Singh Khudian	AAP	
Sri Muktsar Sahib	84	Gidderbaha	Amrinder Singh Raja Warring	INC	Elected to 18th Lok Sabha in June 2024
Sri Muktsar Sahib	84	Gidderbaha	Hardeep Singh Dhillon	AAP	
Sri Muktsar Sahib	85	Malout (SC)	Baljit Kaur	AAP	
Sri Muktsar Sahib	86	Muktsar	Jagdeep Singh Brar	AAP	
Faridkot	87	Faridkot	Gurdit Singh Sekhon	AAP	
Faridkot	88	Kotkapura	Kultar Singh Sandhwan	AAP	Speaker
Faridkot	89	Jaitu (SC)	Amolak Singh	AAP	
Bathinda	90	Rampura Phul	Balkar Singh Sidhu	AAP	
Bathinda	91	Bhucho Mandi (SC)	Master Jagsir Singh	AAP	
Bathinda	92	Bathinda Urban	Jagroop Singh Gill	AAP	
Bathinda	93	Bathinda Rural (SC)	Amit Rattan Kotfatta	AAP	
Bathinda	94	Talwandi Sabo	Baljinder Kaur	AAP	
Bathinda	95	Maur	Sukhvir Maiser Khana	AAP	
Mansa	96	Mansa	Vijay Singla	AAP	
Mansa	97	Sardulgarh	Gurpreet Singh Banawali	AAP	
Mansa	98	Budhlada (SC)	Budhram Singh	AAP	
Sangrur	99	Lehragaga	Barinder Kumar Goyal	AAP	
Sangrur	100	Dirba (SC)	Harpal Singh Cheema	AAP	Dy. Leader of the House
Sangrur	101	Sunam	Aman Arora	AAP	
Sangrur	102	Malerkotla	Mohammad Jamil Ur Rehman	AAP	
Sangrur	103	Amargarh	Jaswant Singh Gajjan Majra	AAP	
Sangrur	104	Dhuri	Bhagwant Mann	AAP	Chief Minister
Sangrur	105	Sangrur	Narinder Kaur Bharaj	AAP	
Barnala	106	Bhadaur (SC)	Labh Singh Ugoke	AAP	
Barnala	107	Barnala	Gurmeet Singh Meet Hayer	AAP	Elected to 18th Lok Sabha in June 2024
Barnala	107	Barnala	Kuldeep Singh Dhillon	INC	
Barnala	108	Mehal Kalan (SC)	Kulwant Singh Pandori	AAP	
Patiala	109	Nabha (SC)	Gurdev Singh Dev Maan	AAP	
Patiala	110	Patiala Rural	Balbir Singh	AAP	
Patiala	111	Rajpura	Neena Mittal	AAP	
Sahibzada Ajit Singh Nagar	112	Dera Bassi	Kuljit Singh Randhawa	AAP	
Patiala	113	Ghanaur	Gurlal Ghanaur	AAP	
Patiala	114	Sanour	Harmit Singh Pathanmajra	AAP	
Patiala	115.	Patiala	Ajit Pal Singh Kohli	AAP	
Patiala	116	Samana	Chetan Singh Jaura Majra	AAP	
Patiala	117	Shutrana (SC)	Kulwant Singh Bazigar	AAP	

== Resolutions passed ==
On 22 March 2022, the assembly unanimously passed a resolution to install the statues of Shaheed Bhagat Singh, Dr. Bhim Rao Ambedkar and Maharaja Ranjit Singh in the assembly complex.

On 1 April 2022, the assembly unanimously passed a resolution to immediately transfer union territory of Chandigarh — the joint capital of Punjab and Haryana, to Punjab.

On 30 June 2022, the assembly passed a resolution recommending the state government that it urges the Government of India to immediately rollback the Agnipath scheme. The resolution was opposed by BJP members of the assembly who were in minority. Punjab was the only state to pass such a resolution.

On 30 June 2022, the assembly passed a resolution recommending the state government that it urges the Government of India to not alter the nature and character of Panjab University. The resolution was opposed by BJP members of the assembly who were in minority.

== Bypolls 2022-2026 ==
Date	Constituency		Previous MLA		Reason	Elected MLA	
10 July 2024	34	Jalandhar West	Sheetal Angural	Aam Aadmi Party	Resigned on 28 March 2024	Mohinder Bhagat	Aam Aadmi Party
20 November 2024	44	Chabbewal	Raj Kumar Chabbewal	Indian National Congress	Resigned on 15 March 2024	Ishank Kumar	Aam Aadmi Party
20 November 2024	10	Dera Baba Nanak	Sukhjinder Singh Randhawa	Indian National Congress	Elected to Lok Sabha on 4 June 2024	Gurdeep Singh Randhawa	Aam Aadmi Party
20 November 2024	84	Gidderbaha	Amrinder Singh Raja Warring	Indian National Congress	Elected to Lok Sabha on 4 June 2024	Hardeep Singh Dimpy Dhillon	Aam Aadmi Party
20 November 2024	103	Barnala	Gurmeet Singh Meet Hayer	Aam Aadmi Party	Elected to Lok Sabha on 4 June 2024	Kuldeep Singh Dhillon	Indian National Congress
19 June 2025	64	Ludhiana West	Gurpreet Gogi	Aam Aadmi Party	Died on 11 January 2025	Sanjeev Arora	Aam Aadmi Party
11 November 2025	21	Tarn Taran	Kashmir Singh Sohal	Aam Aadmi Party	Died on 27 June 2025	Harmeet Singh Sandhu	Aam Aadmi Party
