= 2022 Punjab Legislative Assembly election =

- 20 February 2022

All 117 seats in the Punjab Legislative Assembly 59 seats needed for a majority
- Opinion polls
- Registered: 21,499,804
- Turnout: 72.15% (▼5.05 pp)
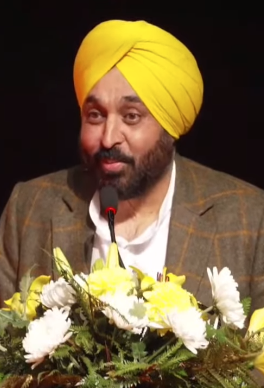

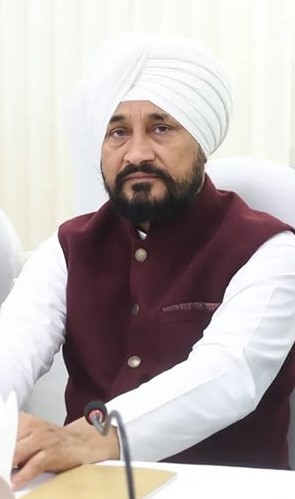

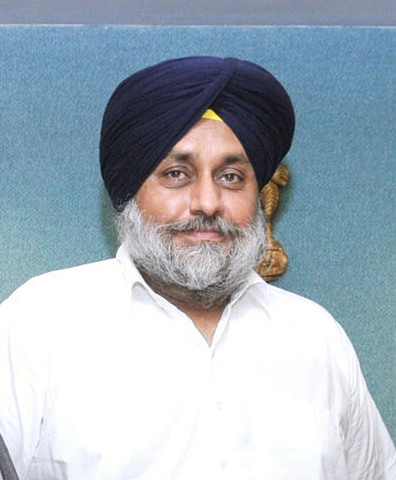
	Majority party	Minority party	Third party
Leader	Bhagwant Mann	Charanjit Singh Channi	Sukhbir Singh Badal
Party	AAP	INC	SAD
Leader since	2022	2021	2019
Leader's seat	Dhuri	Chamkaur Sahib, Bhadaur (both lost)	Jalalabad (lost)
Last election	23.72%, 20 seats	38.50%, 77 seats	25.24%, 15 seats
Seats won	92	18	3
Seat change	▲72	▼59	▼12
Popular vote	6,538,783	3,576,684	2,861,286
Percentage	42.01%	22.98%	18.38%
Swing	▲18.29 pp	▼15.52 pp	▼6.86 pp

- Structure of the Punjab Legislative Assembly after the election
Chief Minister before election
Charanjit Singh Channi
INC
Elected Chief Minister
Bhagwant Mann
AAP

Legislative Assembly elections were held in Punjab on 20 February 2022 to elect the 117 members of the 16th Assembly of the Punjab Legislative Assembly. The votes were counted and the results were declared on 10 March 2022.

The Aam Aadmi Party gained a strong 79% majority in the sixteenth Punjab Legislative Assembly by winning 92 out of 117 seats. AAP Punjab convener and MP Bhagwant Mann was sworn in as Chief Minister on 16 March 2022. Mann ministry was formed with 10 cabinet ministers on 19 March 2022.

== Background and overview ==
The tenure of the Punjab Legislative Assembly was scheduled to end on 23 March 2022. The previous assembly elections were held in February 2017. After the election, Indian National Congress formed the state government, with Amarinder Singh becoming Chief Minister.

=== Political developments ===
On 18 September 2021, Chief Minister Captain Amarinder Singh resigned over differences with other members of Congress and was succeeded by Charanjit Singh Channi. On 27 October 2021, Singh announced that he would be forming a new party to contest the election. He officially resigned from Indian National Congress on 2 November 2021, and founded a new political party, Punjab Lok Congress.

Between June and November 2021, five AAP MLAs joined Congress.

In the 2021 Chandigarh Municipal Corporation election that occurred in December 2021, the Aam Aadmi Party won 14 seats and became the single largest party in the council of total 35 seats.

As of January 2022, four Congress MLAs joined BJP, one of which returned.

On 18 January 2022, AAP declared Bhagwant Mann as their Chief Ministerial candidate for the assembly election.

On 6 February, Congress leader Rahul Gandhi announced incumbent Chief Minister Charanjit Singh Channi as their Chief Ministerial candidate.

=== Farmers' protests ===
The Parliament of India passed 3 agricultural farm laws in Lok Sabha on 17 September 2020 and in the Rajya Sabha on 20 September 2020. The President of India, Ram Nath Kovind, gave his assent on 27 September 2020. Farmers and farmers unions held massive protests over a period of more than a year mainly in Punjab, Haryana, Delhi and Uttar Pradesh. On 19 November 2021, the union government decided to repeal the bills.

== Election schedule ==
The election schedule was announced by the Election Commission of India on 8 January 2022. However, the election date was postponed from 14 February 2022 to 20 February 2022 on account of Guru Ravidass Jayanti.

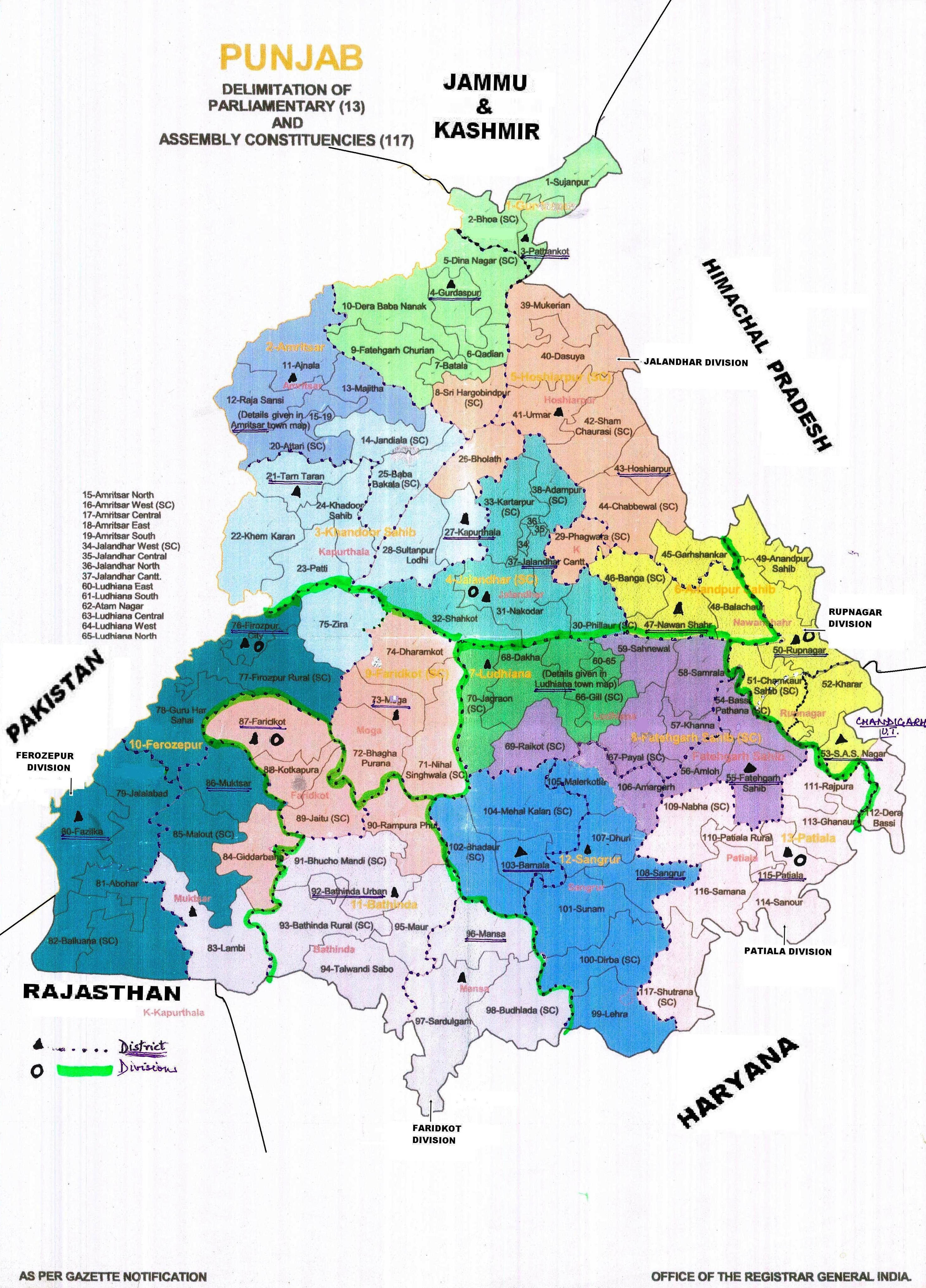
Map of Assembly Constituencies of Punjab, India in 2022

S.No.	Event	Date	Day
1.	Date for nominations	25 January 2022	Tuesday
2.	Last date for filing nominations	1 February 2022	Tuesday
3.	Date for scrutiny of nominations	2 February 2022	Wednesday
4.	Last date for withdrawal of candidatures	4 February 2022	Friday
5.	Date of poll	20 February 2022	Sunday
6.	Date of counting	10 March 2022	Thursday
7.	Date before which election shall be completed	12 March 2022	Saturday

== Voter statistics ==
According to Punjab Election Commission, 1,304 candidates contested the election and there were 21,499,804 registered voters in the state.

Total candidates	Male candidates	Female candidates	Transgender candidates
1304	1209	93	2

Total voters	Male voters	Female voters	Transgender voters
21,499,804	11,298,081	10,200,996	727

S.No.	Types	Voters
1	General voters	20,721,026
2	People with disabilities	158,341
3	Service voters	109,624
4	Non resident Indian voters	1,608
5	Voters above the age of 80	509,205
6	Total	21,499,804

== Parties and alliances ==
SAD dissolved its alliance with the BJP, which had lasted over two decades, over the controversial Farm Bills passed by the Indian Parliament in 2020. On 13 June 2021, SAD and BSP announced an alliance for the assembly election with 97-20 seat sharing. On 28 December 2021, BJP, PLC and SAD(S) announced an alliance for the assembly elections.

AAP contested on all the seats without any alliance.

=== Indian National Congress ===
United Progressive Alliance
Party	Flag	Symbol	Leader	Seats
Indian National Congress			Charanjit Singh Channi (Note: Chief Ministerial candidate was Charanjit Singh Channi.)	117
Total				117

=== Aam Aadmi Party ===
Aam Aadmi Party

Chief Ministerial candidate was Bhagwant Mann.

No.	Party	Flag	Symbol	Leader	Photo	Seats contested	Male candidates	Female candidates
1.	Aam Aadmi Party			Bhagwant Mann		117	105	12

=== Shiromani Akali Dal+ ===
Shiromani Akali Dal+

Chief Ministerial candidate was Sukhbir Singh Badal.

Seats distribution between SAD and BSP

No.	Party	Flag	Symbol	Leader	Photo	Seats contested	Male candidates	Female candidates
1.	Shiromani Akali Dal			Sukhbir Singh Badal		97	92	5
2.	Bahujan Samaj Party			Jasvir Singh Garhi		20	19	1
Total						117	111	6

=== National Democratic Alliance ===
2022 Punjab Legislative Assembly election NDA Seat Sharing

NDA contested the election without a Chief Ministerial face.

PLC was allotted 37 seats, but only contested in 34 seats after it could not find candidates to run in 3 seats. The three seats were returned to BJP. 4 Candidates of PLC contested on BJP symbol.

National Democratic Alliance
Party	Flag	Symbol	Leader	Seats
Bharatiya Janata Party			Ashwani Kumar Sharma	73
Punjab Lok Congress			Amarinder Singh	28
Shiromani Akali Dal (Sanyukt)			Sukhdev Singh Dhindsa	15
Total				116

=== Sanyukt Samaj Morcha+ ===
Sanyukt Samaj Morcha+

Chief Ministerial candidate was Balbir Singh Rajewal.

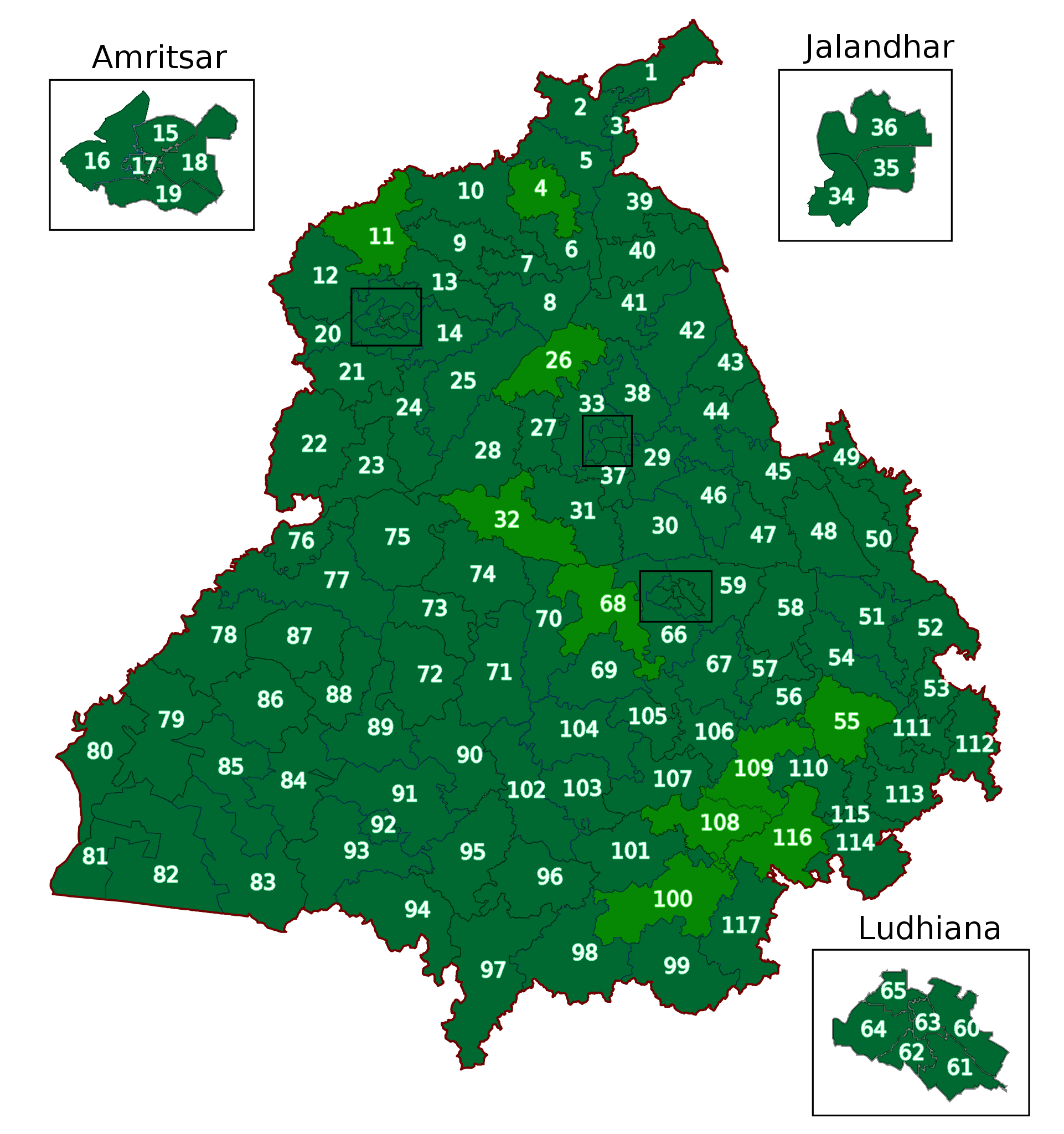
Seats distribution between SSM and SSP.

No.	Party	Flag	Symbol	Leader	Photo	Seats contested	Male candidates	Female candidates
1.	Sanyukt Samaj Morcha contesting as Independents			Balbir Singh Rajewal		107	103	4
2.	Sanyukt Sangharsh Party			Gurnam Singh Charuni		10	10	0
Total						117	113	4

=== Others ===
No.	Party	Flag	Symbol	Leader	Photo	Seats contested	Male candidates	Female candidates
1.	Shiromani Akali Dal (Amritsar)			Simranjit Singh Mann		81	78	3
2.	Lok Insaaf Party			Simarjit Singh Bains		35	34	1
3.	Communist Party of India (Marxist)			Sukhwinder Singh Sekhon		14	14	0
4.	Communist Party of India (Marxist–Leninist) Liberation			Sukhdarshan Singh Natt		11	11	0
5.	Communist Party of India			Bant Singh Brar		7	7	0

== Candidates ==
AAP CM candidate Bhagwant Mann contested from Dhuri.

Congress leader and CM Charanjit Singh Channi contested from Chamkaur Sahib and Bhadaur, and former CM Rajinder Kaur Bhattal contested from Lehragaga from INC.

Former CM, Prakash Singh Badal, member of Shiromani Akali Dal, contested from Lambi. While SAD-BSP alliance’s CM candidate Sukhbir Singh Badal contested from Jalalabad. Former CM, Amarinder Singh, member of Punjab Lok Congress (PLC) contested from Patiala Urban.

There were total 1304 candidates in fray. 2266 candidates filed their nominations and out of these, 1645 found valid. 341 withdrew their candidature.

- (Names of the winning candidates are in bold text)

Constituency		**UPA**		**AAP**		**SAD +**	
No.	Name	Party	Candidate	Party	Candidate	Party	Candidate
**Pathankot District**
1	Sujanpur	INC	Naresh Puri	AAP	Amit Singh Manto	SAD	Raj Kumar Gupta
2	Bhoa	INC	Jogindar Pal	AAP	Lal Chand Kataruchakk	BSP	Rakesh Kumar Majotra
3	Pathankot	INC	Amit Vij	AAP	Vibhuti Sharma	BSP	Advocate Jyoti Pal Bhim
**Gurdaspur District**
4	Gurdaspur	**INC**	Barindermeet Singh Pahra	AAP	Raman Bahel	SAD	Gurbachan Singh Babehali
5	Dina Nagar	**INC**	Aruna Chaudhary	AAP	Shamsher Singh	BSP	Kamaljit Chawla Mahasha
6	Qadian	**INC**	Partap Singh Bajwa	AAP	Jagroop Singh Shekhwan	SAD	Guriqbal Singh Mahal
7	Batala	INC	Ashwani Sekhri	AAP	Amansher Singh (Sherry Kalsi)	SAD	Sucha Singh Chhotepur
8	Sri Hargobindpur	INC	Mandeep Singh Rangar Nangal	AAP	Amarpal Singh	SAD	Rajanbir Singh
9	Fatehgarh Churian	**INC**	Tripat Rajinder Singh Bajwa	AAP	Balbir Singh Pannu	SAD	Lakhbir Singh Lodhinangal
10	Dera Baba Nanak	**INC**	Sukhjinder Singh Randhawa	AAP	Gurdeep Singh Randhawa	SAD	Ravikaran Singh Kahlon
**Amritsar District**
11	Ajnala	INC	Harpratap Singh Ajnala	AAP	Kuldeep Singh Dhaliwal	SAD	Amarpal Singh Ajnala
12	Rajasansi	**INC**	Sukhwinder Singh Sarkaria	AAP	Baldev Singh Meadian	SAD	Veer Singh Lopoke
13	Majitha	INC	Jagwinder Pal Singh	AAP	Sukhjinder Singh Lalli Majithia	**SAD**	**Ganieve Kaur Majithia**
14	Jandiala Guru	INC	Sukhwinder Singh Danny	AAP	Harbhajan Singh E.T.O.	SAD	Satinderjit Singh
15	Amritsar North	INC	Sunil Dutti	AAP	Kunwar Vijay Pratap Singh	SAD	Anil Joshi
16	Amritsar West	INC	Raj Kumar Verka	AAP	Jasbir Singh Sandhu	SAD	Dalveer Singh Verka
17	Amritsar Central	INC	Om Parkash Soni	AAP	Ajay Gupta	BSP	Dalbir Kaur Rangretta
18	Amritsar East	INC	Navjot Singh Sidhu	AAP	Jeevan Jyot Kaur	SAD	Bikram Singh Majithia
19	Amritsar South	INC	Inderbir Singh Bolaria	AAP	Inderbir Singh Nijjar	SAD	Talbir Singh Gill
20	Attari	INC	Tarsem Singh Sialka	AAP	Jaswinder Singh	SAD	Gulzar Singh Ranike
**Tarn Taran District**
21	Tarn Taran	INC	Dr. Dharambir Agnihotri	AAP	Kashmir Singh Sohal	SAD	Harmeet Singh Sandhu
22	Khem Karan	INC	Sukhpal Singh Bhullar	AAP	Sarvan Singh Dhun	SAD	Virsa Singh Valtoha
23	Patti	INC	Harminder Singh Gill	AAP	Laljit Singh Bhullar	SAD	Adesh Partap Singh Kairon
24	Khadoor Sahib	INC	Ramanjeet Singh Sikki	AAP	Manjinder Singh Lalpura	SAD	Ranjit Singh Brahmpura
**Amritsar District**
25	Baba Bakala	INC	Santokh Singh Bhalaipur	AAP	Dalbir Singh Tong	SAD	Baljit Singh
**Kapurthala District**
26	Bholath	**INC**	Sukhpal Singh Khaira	AAP	Ranjeet Singh Rana	SAD	Jagir Kaur
27	Kapurthala	**INC**	Rana Gurjeet Singh	AAP	Manju Rana	BSP	Davinder Singh Dhapai
28	Sultanpur Lodhi	INC	Navtej Singh Cheema	AAP	Sajjan Singh Cheema	SAD	Harminder Singh
29	Phagwara	**INC**	Balwinder Singh Dhaliwal	AAP	Joginder Singh Maan	BSP	Jasvir Singh Garhi
**Jalandhar District**
30	Phillaur	**INC**	Vikramjit Singh Chaudhary	AAP	Prem Kumar	SAD	Baldev Khaira
31	Nakodar	INC	Navjot Singh	AAP	Inderjit Kaur Mann	SAD	Gurpartap Singh Wadala
32	Shahkot	**INC**	Hardev Singh Ladi	AAP	Rattan Singh Kakarkalan	SAD	Bachittar Singh Kohar
33	Kartarpur	INC	Chaudhary Surinder Singh	AAP	DCP Balkar Singh	BSP	Advocate Balwinder Kumar
34	Jalandhar West	INC	Sushil Kumar Rinku	AAP	Sheetal Angural	BSP	Anil Kumar Meenia
35	Jalandhar Central	INC	Rajinder Beri	AAP	Raman Arora	SAD	Chandan Grewal
36	Jalandhar North	**INC**	Avtar Singh Junior	AAP	Dinesh Dhal	BSP	Kuldeep Singh Lubana
37	Jalandhar Cantonment	**INC**	Pargat Singh	AAP	Surinder Singh Sodhi	SAD	Jagbir Singh Brar
38	Adampur	**INC**	Sukhwinder Singh Kotli	AAP	Jeet Lal Bhaati	SAD	Pawan Kumar
**Hoshiarpur District**
39	Mukerian	INC	Indu Bala	AAP	Gurdhian Singh Multani	SAD	Sarabjit Singh Sabbi
40	Dasuya	INC	Arun Dogra	AAP	Karambir Singh Ghuman	BSP	Sushil Sharma Pinki
41	Urmar	INC	Sangat Singh Gilzian	AAP	Jasvir Singh Raja Gill	BSP	Lakhwinder Singh Lucky
42	Sham Chaurasi	INC	Pawan Kumar Adia	AAP	Dr. Ravjot Singh	BSP	Mohinder Singh Sandhar
43	Hoshiarpur	INC	Sunder Sham Arora	AAP	Pandit Brahm Shankar Jimpa	BSP	Varinder Parihar
44	Chabbewal	**INC**	Raj Kumar Chabbewal	AAP	Harminder Singh Sandhu	SAD	Sohan Singh Thandal
45	Garhshankar	INC	Amarpreet Lally	AAP	Jai Kishan Singh Rori	SAD	Surinder Singh Rathan
**Shaheed Bhagat Singh Nagar (S.B.S Nagar)/Nawan Shahr District**
46	Banga	INC	Tarlochan Singh Soondh	AAP	Kuljit Singh Sarghal	**SAD**	**Sukhwinder Kumar**
47.	Nawan Shahr	INC	Satbir Singh Saini	AAP	Lalit Mohan Pathak	**BSP**	**Nachhatar Pal**
48.	Balachaur	INC	Darshan Lal	AAP	Santosh Kataria	SAD	Sunita Chaudhary
**Rupnagar District**
49	Anandpur Sahib	INC	Kanwarpal Singh	AAP	Harjot Singh Bains	BSP	Nitin Nanda Tarkhan
50	Rupnagar	INC	Barinder Singh Dhillon	AAP	Dinesh Chadha	SAD	Diljeet Singh Cheema
51	Chamkaur sahib	INC	Charanjit Singh Channi	AAP	Dr Charanjit Singh	BSP	AIG Harmohan Singh Sandhu
**Sahibzada Ajit Singh Nagar (S.A.S Nagar)/Mohali District**
52.	Kharar	INC	Vijay Sharma Tinku	AAP	Anmol Gagan Maan	SAD	Ranjit Singh Gill
53.	S.A.S. Nagar	INC	Balbir Singh Sidhu	AAP	Kulwant Singh	SAD	Parvinder Singh Sohana
**Fatehgarh Sahib District**
54.	Bassi Pathana	INC	Gurpreet Singh GP	AAP	Rupinder Singh Happy	BSP	Shiv Kumar Kalyan
55.	Fatehgarh Sahib	INC	Kuljit Singh Nagra	AAP	Lakhbir Singh Rai	SAD	Jagdeep Singh Cheema
56.	Amloh	INC	Randeep Singh Nabha	AAP	Gurinder Singh	SAD	Gurpreet Singh Khanna
**Ludhiana District**
57.	Khanna	INC	Gurkirat Singh Kotli	AAP	Tarunpreet Singh Sond	SAD	Jasdeep Kaur
58.	Samrala	INC	Raja Gill	AAP	Jagtar Singh	SAD	Paramjit Singh Dhillon
59.	Sahnewal	INC	Vikram Bajwa	AAP	Hardeep Singh Mundian	SAD	Sharanjit Singh Dhillon
60.	Ludhiana East	INC	Sanjeev Talwar	AAP	Daljit Singh Grewal	SAD	Ranjit Singh Gill
61.	Ludhiana South	INC	Ishwarjot Singh Cheema	AAP	Rajinder Pal Kaur Chhina	SAD	Hira Singh Gabria
62.	Atam Nagar	INC	Kamaljit Singh Karwal	AAP	Kulwant Singh Sidhu	SAD	Harish Rai
63.	Ludhiana Central	INC	Surinder Kumar Dawar	AAP	Ashok 'Pappi' Prashar	SAD	Pritpal Singh Palli
64.	Ludhiana West	INC	Bharat Bhushan	AAP	Gurpreet Singh Gogi	SAD	Maheshindar Singh Grewal
65.	Ludhiana North	INC	Rakesh Pandey	AAP	Madan Lal Bagga	SAD	R. D. Sharma
66.	Gill	INC	Kuldeep Singh Vaid	AAP	Jiwan Singh Sangowal	SAD	Darshan Singh
67.	Payal	INC	Lakhvir Singh Lakha	AAP	Manwinder Singh Gyaspura	BSP	Dr. Jaspreet Singh Beeja
68.	Dakha	INC	Capt. Sandeep Singh Sandhu	AAP	KNS Kang	**SAD**	**Manpreet Singh Ayali**
69.	Raikot	INC	Kamil Amar Singh	AAP	Hakam Singh Thekedar	BSP	Balwinder Singh Sandhu
70.	Jagraon	INC	Jagtar Singh Jagga Hissowal	AAP	Saravjit Kaur Manuke	SAD	Shiv Ram Kaler
**Moga District**
71.	Nihal Singh Wala	INC	Bhupendra Sahoke	**AAP**	Manjit Singh Bilaspur	SAD	Baldev Singh Manuke
72.	Bhagha Purana	INC	Darshan Singh Brar	**AAP**	Amritpal Singh Sukhanand	SAD	Tirath Singh Mahla
73.	Moga	INC	Malvika Sood	**AAP**	Dr. Amandeep Kaur Arora	SAD	Barjinder Singh Brar
74.	Dharamkot	INC	Sukhjit Singh Lohgarh	**AAP**	Devinder Singh Laddi Dhos	SAD	Totta Singh
**Ferozpur District**
75.	Zira	INC	Kulbir Singh Zira	**AAP**	Naresh Kataria	SAD	Janmeja Singh Sekhon
76.	Firozpur City	INC	Parminder Singh Pinky	**AAP**	Ranveer Singh Bhullar	SAD	Rohit Vohra
77.	Firozpur Rural	INC	Ashu Bangar	**AAP**	Rajnish Dahiya	SAD	Joginder Singh
78.	Guru Har Sahai	INC	Vijay Kalra	**AAP**	Fauja Singh Srari	SAD	Vardev Singh Maan
**Fazilka District**
79.	Jalalabad	INC	Mohan Singh Phalianwala	**AAP**	Jagdeep 'Goldy' Kamboj	SAD	Sukhbir Singh Badal
80.	Fazilka	INC	Davinder Gubaya	**AAP**	Narinderpal Singh Sawna	SAD	Hansraj Josan
81.	Abohar	**INC**	**Sandeep Jakhar**	AAP	Deep Kamboj	SAD	Mahinderpal Rinwa
82.	Balluana	INC	Rajinder Kaur	**AAP**	Amandeep Singh ‘Goldy’ Musafir	SAD	Prithi Ram Meghwal
**Sri Muktsar Sahib District**
83.	Lambi	INC	Jagpal Singh Abulkhurana	**AAP**	Gurmeet Singh Khudian	SAD	Parkash Singh Badal
84.	Gidderbaha	**INC**	Amarinder Singh Raja Warring	AAP	Preetpal Sharma	SAD	Hardeep Singh Dhillon
85.	Malout	INC	Rupinder Ruby	**AAP**	Dr. Baljit Kaur	SAD	Harpreet Singh Kotbhai
86.	Muktsar	INC	Karan Kaur Brar	**AAP**	Jagdeep Singh Brar	SAD	Kanwarjit Singh
**Faridkot District**
87.	Faridkot	INC	Kushaldeep Singh Dhillon	**AAP**	Gurdit Singh Sekhon	SAD	Parambans Singh Romana
88.	Kotkapura	INC	Ajaipal Singh Sandhu	**AAP**	Kultar Singh Sandhwan	SAD	Mantar Singh Brar
89.	Jaitu	INC	Darshan Singh Dilwan	**AAP**	Amolak Singh	SAD	Suba Singh Badal
**Bathinda District**
90.	Rampura Phul	INC	Gurpreet Singh Kangar	**AAP**	Balkar Singh Sidhu	SAD	Sikander Singh Maluka
91.	Bhucho Mandi	INC	Pritam Singh Kotbhai	**AAP**	Master Jagsir Singh	SAD	Darshan Singh Kotfatta
92.	Bathinda Urban	INC	Manpreet Singh Badal	**AAP**	Jagroop Singh Gill	SAD	Sarup Chand Singla
93.	Bathinda Rural	INC	Harvinder Singh Gill Laddi	**AAP**	Amit Rattan Kotfatta	SAD	Parkash Singh Bhatti
94.	Talwandi Sabo	INC	Khushbaz Singh Jatana	**AAP**	Baljinder Kaur	SAD	Jeet Mohinder Singh Sidhu
95.	Maur	INC	Dr. Manoj Bala Bansal	**AAP**	Sukhvir Maiser Khana	SAD	Jagmeet Singh Brar
**Mansa District**
96.	Mansa	INC	Sidhu Moosewala	**AAP**	Dr Vijay Singla	SAD	Prem Arora
97.	Sardulgarh	INC	Bikram Singh Mofar	**AAP**	Gurpreet Singh Banawali	SAD	Dilraj Singh Bhunder
98.	Budhlada	INC	Ranvir Kaur Meya	**AAP**	Budhram Singh	SAD	Dr Nishan Singh
**Sangrur District**
99.	Lehragaga	INC	Rajinder Kaur Bhattal	**AAP**	Barinder Kumar Goyal	SAD	Gobind Singh Longowal
100.	Dirba	INC	Ajaib Singh Rataul	**AAP**	Harpal Singh Cheema	SAD	Gulzar Singh
101.	Sunam	INC	Jaswinder Singh Dhiman	**AAP**	Aman Arora	SAD	Baldev Singh Mann
**Barnala District**
102.	Bhadaur	INC	Charanjit Singh Channi	**AAP**	Labh Singh Ugoke	SAD	Satnam Singh
103.	Barnala	INC	Manish Bansal	**AAP**	Gurmeet Singh Hayer	SAD	Kulwant Singh
104.	Mehal Kalan	INC	Harchand Kaur	**AAP**	Kulwant Singh Pandori	BSP	Chamkaur Singh
**Malerkotla district**
105.	Malerkotla	INC	Razia Sultana	**AAP**	Dr Mohd. Zamil-Ur-Rehman	SAD	Uneus Mohammad
106.	Amargarh	INC	Smit Singh	**AAP**	Jaswant Singh Gajjanmajra	SAD	Iqbal Singh Jhundan
**Sangrur District**
107.	Dhuri	INC	Dalvir Singh Goldy	**AAP**	Bhagwant Singh Mann	SAD	Parkash Chand Garg
108.	Sangrur	INC	Vijay Inder Singla	**AAP**	Narinder Kaur Bharaj	SAD	Winnerjit Singh Goldy
**Patiala District**
109.	Nabha	INC	Sadhu Singh Dharamsot	**AAP**	Gurdev Singh Dev Mann	SAD	Kabir Dass
110.	Patiala Rural	INC	Mohit Mohindra	**AAP**	Dr. Balbir Singh	SAD	Jaspal Singh Chatha
111.	Rajpura	INC	Hardial Singh Kamboj	**AAP**	Neena Mittal	SAD	Charanjit Singh Brar
**Sahibzada Ajit Singh Nagar (S.A.S Nagar)/Mohali District**
112.	Dera Bassi	INC	Deepinder Singh Dhillon	**AAP**	Kuljit Singh Randhawa	SAD	Narinder Kumar Sharma
**Patiala District**
113.	Ghanaur	INC	Madan Lal Jalalpur	**AAP**	Gurlal Ghanaur	SAD	Prem Singh Chandumajra
114.	Sanour	INC	Harinder Pal Singh Mann	**AAP**	Harmeet Singh Pathanmajra	SAD	Harinder Pal Singh Chandumajra
115.	Patiala	INC	Vishnu Sharma	**AAP**	Ajitpal Singh Kohli	SAD	Harpal Juneja
116.	Samana	INC	Rajinder Singh	**AAP**	Chetan Singh Jormajra	SAD	Surjit Singh Rakhra
117.	Shutrana	INC	Darbara Singh	**AAP**	Kulwant Singh Bazigar	SAD	Vaninder Kaur

== Campaigns ==
Samyukt Kisan Morcha (SKM), the umbrella body of farmers, campaigned against the ruling BJP by organising public meetings and rallies asking farmers to not vote for BJP. SKM had organised the 2020–2021 Indian farmers' protest against the controversial three farm acts which were passed by the BJP-led Union Government in the BJP controlled Parliament of India in September 2020. These laws were eventually withdrawn by the Union government.

On 31 January 2022, the farmer leaders observed "Vishwasghat Diwas" (treachery day) across India after the Union government failed to fulfill promises that were made to the farmers during the withdrawal of agitation against three farm laws. SKM leaders have warned that the farm laws may be re-introduced if BJP wins the elections.

=== Policy positions ===
==== Farm Laws ====
BJP's Union Agriculture Minister Narendra Singh Tomar in December 2021, had said that BJP brought the 3 agriculture amendment laws (repealed in 2021). "But the government is not disappointed. We moved a step back and we will move forward again because farmers are India’s backbone."

The AAP is against the farm laws and had supported the farmers' unions during their year-long protest against the farm laws.

=== Campaigning ===
==== Indian National Congress ====
Congress party started their campaign from Atamnagar, Ludhiana with CM Charanjit Singh Channi and Punjab Pradesh Congress Committee president Navjot Singh Sidhu.

==== Shiromani Akali Dal ====
In March 2021, Shiromani Akali Dal began holding rallies and protests under slogan "Punjab Mangda Jawaab" led by party president Sukhbir Singh Badal that criticised Amarinder Singh over issues including a power tariff hike, the value-added tax (VAT) on fuel and his loan waiver promise.

==== Aam Aadmi Party ====
In March 2021, Delhi CM Arvind Kejriwal held a Kisaan Mahapanchayat at Bagha Purana in Moga district and began campaigning for elections. On 28 June 2021, Kejriwal announced in a speech in Chandigarh that 300 units of free electricity would be provided to all Punjabis if the party wins the election. On 30 September 2021, Kejriwal also announced that if AAP wins the election, his government would build Mohalla Clinics in Punjab that would provide free healthcare facilities. On 22 November 2021, Arvind Kejriwal announced that if AAP wins Punjab then 1,000 rupees will be given to every women above 18 years of age.

On 9 February, Aam Aadmi Party’s chief ministerial candidate and MP, Bhagwant Mann raised issues about farmers in the Lok Sabha. The payment to sugarcane farmers for the year 2020–21 and 2021–22 had been pending. He appealed for clearing the due early along with interest. He asked for compensation for the losses in cotton farmers due to the pest attack. He asked that the Union government should recognise the farmers who died during the 2020–2021 Indian farmers' protest.

Anmol Gagan Maan sang the campaign song for AAP, "Bhagat Singh, Kartar Sarabha saare hi ban challe, bhai hun jaago aaiyaan, sarkaar badlan challey, bhai hun jaago aaiyaan". Indian Express called the song a "huge hit during campaigning".

==== Bahujan Samaj Party ====
On 31 December 2020, Bahujan Samaj Party cadres, led by state president Jasbir Singh Garhi, first gathered at Shambhu border and then left in a cavalcade of 100 cars to join the protest and show solidarity to the farmers. They also waved banners in support of farmers and on unity of farmers and labourers, as most number of labourers come from the Scheduled Castes. It was the first time that a political party was part of the farmers protest in such large numbers.

Garhi has also criticised what he argues are lies and corruption of the incumbent government on the subject of the implementation of Post Metric Scholarship Scheme, calling it the "Scholarship Scheme Scam".

==== Bharatiya Janata Party ====
After two years, In election year Modi came to Punjab for a public rally after repealing controversial Farm Laws for NDA. However, rally was cancelled due to farmers protest at Ferozpur–Moga road.

=== Campaign controversies ===
==== Election Commission of India ====
On 8 January 2022, Election Commission of India announced ban on physical rallies until 15 January, due to high positivity rate of COVID-19. ECI further extended the ban until 22 January. The ban was further extended to 31 January 2022.

==== INC ====
Manish Tewari, the only MP from Congress in Punjab was not included in the list of star campaigners. Senior leader Ghulam Nabi Azad was also left out. The two leaders had written to Congress president asking for reforms in Congress party. Sunil Jakhar claimed he wasn't made Chief Minister despite having the support of the most 42 MLAs, and quit from active politics few days later.

=== Campaign finance ===
ECI increased the expenditure limit to ₹40 lakh.

=== Dynasty politics ===
==== Shiromani Akali Dal ====
1. Former Deputy CM Sukhbir Singh Badal, Son of Former CM Parkash Singh Badal is contesting from Jalalabad.
2. Former Punjab Minister Tota Singh is contesting from Dharamkot and his son Barjinder Singh Makhan Brar is contesting from Moga.
3. Former Anandpur Sahib Lok Sabha MP Prem Singh Chandumajra is contesting from Ghanaur and his son Harinderpal Singh Chandumajra (incumbent MLA) is contesting from Sanour.

==== Indian National Congress ====
Congress has decided to follow 'one family, one ticket' norm while selecting party candidates for the upcoming assembly elections in Punjab.

1. Manish Bansal, son of Pawan Kumar Bansal, former Minister of Railways is contesting from Barnala.
2. Smit Singh, nephew of Navjot Singh Sidhu is contesting from Amargarh.
3. Vikram Bajwa, son-in-law of Rajinder Kaur Bhattal is contesting from Sahnewal.

== Poll predictions ==
=== Opinion polls ===
Polling aggregates
Active Parties
Indian National Congress
Aam Aadmi Party
Shiromani Akali Dal+
Others

Date published	Polling agency						Lead
Date published	Polling agency	UPA	AAP	SAD+	NDA	Others	Lead
7 February 2022	ABP News – C-Voter	30%	39.8%	20.2%	8%	2%	9.8%
23 January 2022	Polstrat-NewsX	37.2%	39.7%	16.6%	2.7%	3.8%	2.5%
10 January 2022	ABP News – C-Voter	35.9%	39.7%	17.7%	2.5%	4.2%	3.8%
21 December 2021	Polstrat-NewsX	35.20%	38.83%	21.01%	2.33%	2.63%	3.63%
11 December 2021	ABP News – C-Voter	34.1%	38.4%	20.4%	2.6%	4.5%	4.3%
12 November 2021	ABP News – C-Voter	34.9%	36.5%	20.6%	2.2%	5.8%	1.6%
8 October 2021	ABP News – C-Voter	31.8%	35.9%	22.5%	3.8%	6.0%	5.1%
4 September 2021	ABP News – C-Voter	28.8%	35.1%	21.8%	7.3%	7.0%	6.3%
19 March 2021	ABP News – C-Voter	31.5%	36.5%	21.3%	5.0%	5.7%	5.0%

Date published	Polling agency						Lead	Remarks
Date published	Polling agency	UPA	AAP	SAD+	NDA	Others	Lead	Remarks
7 February 2022	ABP News – C-Voter	24-30	55-63	20-26	3-11	0-2	25-39	Hung
23 January 2022	Polstrat-NewsX	42-45	52-55	17-20	0-2	0-1	7-13	Hung
10 January 2022	ABP News – C-Voter	37-43	52-58	17-23	1-3	0-1	9-21	Hung
21 December 2021	Polstrat-NewsX	40-45	47-52	22-26	1-2	0-1	2-12	Hung
11 December 2021	ABP News – C-Voter	39-45	50-56	17-23	0-3	0-1	5-16	Hung
12 November 2021	ABP News – C-Voter	42-50	47-53	16-24	0-1	0-1	0-11	Hung
8 October 2021	ABP News – C-Voter	39-47	49-55	17-25	0-1	0-1	2-16	Hung
4 September 2021	ABP News – C-Voter	38-46	51-57	16-24	0-1	0-1	5-19	Hung
19 March 2021	ABP News – C-Voter	43-49	51-57	12-18	0-3	0-5	2-14	Hung

=== Exit polls ===
The Election Commission banned the media from publishing exit polls between 7 AM on 10 February 2022 and 6:30 PM on 7 March 2022. Violation of the directive would be punishable with two years of imprisonment. Accordingly the exit polls below were published in the evening of 7 March.

Polling agency						Lead	Remarks
Polling agency	UPA	AAP	SAD+	NDA	Others	Lead	Remarks
ABP News – C Voter	22-28	51-61	20-26	7-13	1-5	23-39	Hung
Dainik Bhaskar	26-32	38-44	30-39	7-10	1-2	1-14	Hung
NewsX – Polstrat	24-29	56-61	22-26	1-6	0-3	27-37	Hung
India Today – Axis My India	19-31	76-90	7-11	1-4	0-2	55-71	AAP Majority
India TV-Ground Zero	49-59	27-37	20-30	2-6	1-3	12-32	Hung
News24-Today's Chanakya	10	100	6	1	0-1	90	AAP Majority
Republic-P Marq	23-31	62-70	16-24	1-3	1-3	31-47	AAP Majority
Times Now – VETO	22	70	19	5	1	48	AAP Majority
TV 9 Marathi-Polstrat	24-29	56-61	22-26	1-6	0-3	27-37	Hung
Zee News-DesignBoxed	26-33	52-61	24-32	3-7	0	19-35	Hung
Election results	18	92	4	2	1	74	AAP Majority

== Incidents ==
=== Voting Machine malfunction ===
Electronic Voter Machine (EVM) malfunction was reported at several places. AAP reported these incidents to the Election Commission.

== Voter turnout and incidents ==
District	Seats	Turnout (%)
Amritsar	11	65.87
Barnala	3	73.84
Bathinda	6	78.19
Faridkot	3	76.31
Fatehgarh Sahib	3	76.87
Fazilka	4	78.18
Firozpur	4	77.59
Gurdaspur	7	71.28
Hoshiarpur	7	68.66
Jalandhar	9	66.95
Kapurthala	4	68.07
Ludhiana	14	67.67
Malerkotla	2	78.28
Mansa	3	81.24
Moga	4	73.95
Pathankot	3	74.69
Patiala	8	73.11
Rupnagar	3	73.99
S. A. S. Nagar	3	66.87
Sangrur	5	78.04
S. B. S. Nagar	3	70.75
Sri Muktsar Sahib	4	80.49
Tarn Taran	4	70.09
Total	117	71.95

=== Voting Machine malfunction ===
Electronic Voter Machine (EVM) malfunction was reported at several places. AAP reported these incidents to the Election Commission.

== Results ==
Map displaying constituencies won by parties

92	18	4	3
AAP	UPA	SAD+	Others

#0072B0

Seat Share by Alliance
1. AAP – 92 (78.6%)
2. UPA – 18 (15.4%)
3. SAD+ – 4 (3.40%)
4. NDA – 2 (1.70%)
5. IND – 1 (0.90%)
Vote Share
1. AAP (42.0%)
2. INC (23.0%)
3. SAD+ (20.1%)
4. NDA (7.73%)
5. IND (2.94%)
6. SAD(A) (2.48%)
7. LIP (0.28%)
8. Others (1.00%)
9. NOTA (0.71%)

=== Results by alliance and party ===
Alliance	Party	Popular vote			Seats		
Alliance	Party	Votes	%	±pp	Contested	Won	Change
None	Aam Aadmi Party 92 / 117 (79%)	6,538,783	42.01	▲18.31	117	92	▲72
UPA	Indian National Congress 18 / 117 (15%)	3,576,684	22.98	▼15.52	117	18	▼59
SAD+	Shiromani Akali Dal 3 / 117 (3%)	2,861,286	18.38	▼6.82	97	3	▼12
SAD+	Bahujan Samaj Party 1 / 117 (0.9%)	275,232	1.77	▲0.27	20	1	▲1
SAD+	Total	3,136,518	20.15		117	4	▼11
NDA	Bharatiya Janata Party 2 / 117 (2%)	1,027,143	6.6	▲1.2	73	2	▼1
NDA	Punjab Lok Congress	84,697	0.54	▲0.54	28	0	New
NDA	Shiromani Akali Dal (Sanyukt)	91,995	0.59		15	0	New
NDA	Total	1,203,835	7.73		116	2	▼1
None	Shiromani Akali Dal (Amritsar)	386,176	2.48	▲2.18	0		
None	Lok Insaaf Party	43,229	0.28	▼0.92			
None	Independents	457,410	2.94		0	1	▲1
None	Others		0.72			0	▼2
None	NOTA	110,308	0.71				
Total							
Valid votes							
Invalid votes							
Votes cast/ turnout		15,563,720	72.0				
Abstentions							
Registered voters		21,608,701					

=== Results by region ===
District	Seats					
District	Seats	AAP	INC	SAD+	NDA	OTH
Malwa	69	66	2	1	—N/a	—N/a
Majha	25	16	7	1	1	—N/a
Doaba	23	10	9	2	1	1
Total	117	92	18	4	2	1

=== Results by division ===
District	Seats					
District	Seats	AAP	INC	SAD+	NDA	OTH
Jalandhar	45	25	16	1	2	1
Patiala	35	34	—N/a	1	—N/a	—N/a
Firozpur	16	14	2	—N/a	—N/a	—N/a
Faridkot	12	12	—N/a	—N/a	—N/a	—N/a
Rupnagar	9	7	—N/a	2	—N/a	—N/a
Total	117	92	18	4	2	1

=== Results by district ===
District	Seats					
District	Seats	AAP	INC	SAD+	NDA	OTH
Jalandhar Division
Amritsar Sahib	11	9	1	1	—N/a	—N/a
Gurdaspur	7	2	5	—N/a	—N/a	—N/a
Tarn Taran Sahib	4	4	—N/a	—N/a	—N/a	—N/a
Pathankot	3	1	1	—N/a	1	—N/a
Jalandhar	9	4	5	—N/a	—N/a	—N/a
Hoshiarpur	7	5	1	—N/a	1	—N/a
Kapurthala	4	—N/a	3	—N/a	—N/a	1
Patiala Division
Ludhiana	14	13	—N/a	1	—N/a	—N/a
Patiala	8	8	—N/a	—N/a	—N/a	—N/a
Sangrur	5	5	—N/a	—N/a	—N/a	—N/a
Barnala	3	3	—N/a	—N/a	—N/a	—N/a
Fatehgarh Sahib	3	3	—N/a	—N/a	—N/a	—N/a
Malerkotla	2	2	—N/a	—N/a	—N/a	—N/a
Firozpur Division
Fazilka	4	3	1	—N/a	—N/a	—N/a
Firozpur	4	4	—N/a	—N/a	—N/a	—N/a
Moga	4	4	—N/a	—N/a	—N/a	—N/a
Sri Muktsar Sahib	4	3	1	—N/a	—N/a	—N/a
Rupnagar Division
S.B.S. Nagar	3	1	—N/a	2	—N/a	—N/a
S.A.S. Nagar	3	3	—N/a	—N/a	—N/a	—N/a
Rupnagar	3	3	—N/a	—N/a	—N/a	—N/a
Faridkot Division
Bathinda	6	6	—N/a	—N/a	—N/a	—N/a
Faridkot	3	3	—N/a	—N/a	—N/a	—N/a
Mansa	3	3	—N/a	—N/a	—N/a	—N/a
Total	117	92	18	4	2	1

=== Results by constituency ===
District	Constituency			Winner				Runner Up				Margin	%
District	#	Name	Poll %	Candidate	Party	Votes	%	Candidate	Party	Votes	%	Margin	%
Pathankot	1	Sujanpur	75.95	Naresh Puri	INC	46,916	36.27	Dinesh Singh	BJP	42,280	32.69	4,636	3.58
Pathankot	2	Bhoa (SC)	73.60	Lal Chand	AAP	50,339	36.59	Joginder Pal	INC	49,135	35.72	1,204	0.87
Pathankot	3	Pathankot	73.82	Ashwani Sharma	BJP	43,132	38.01	Amit Vij	INC	35,373	31.17	7,759	6.84
Gurdaspur	4	Gurdaspur	72.36	Barindermeet Pahra	INC	43,743	35.23	Gurbachan Babbehali	SAD	36,408	29.33	7,335	5.90
Gurdaspur	5	Dina Nagar (SC)	71.03	Aruna Chaudhary	INC	51,133	36.60	Shamsher Singh	AAP	50,002	35.79	1,131	0.81
Gurdaspur	6	Qadian	72.16	Partap Singh Bajwa	INC	48,679	36.55	Guriqbal Singh Mahal	SAD	41,505	31.16	7,174	5.39
Gurdaspur	7	Batala	67.22	Amansher Singh	AAP	55,570	43.57	Ashwani Sekhri	INC	27,098	21.25	28,472	22.32
Gurdaspur	8	Sri Hargobindpur (SC)	68.69	Amarpal Singh	AAP	53,205	42.74	Rajanbir Singh	SAD	36,242	29.12	16,963	13.62
Gurdaspur	9	Fatehgarh Churian	72.43	Tripat Singh Bajwa	INC	46,311	35.95	Lakhbir Lodhinangal	SAD	40,766	31.65	5,545	4.30
Gurdaspur	10	Dera Baba Nanak	73.25	Sukhjinder Randhawa	INC	52,555	36.41	Ravikaran Kahlon	SAD	52,089	36.08	466	0.33
Amritsar	11	Ajnala	76.90	Kuldeep Dhaliwal	AAP	43,555	35.69	Amarpal Ajnala	SAD	35,712	29.26	7,843	6.43
Amritsar	12	Rajasansi	74.72	Sukhbinder Sarkaria	INC	46,872	35.08	Vir Singh Lopoke	SAD	41,398	30.98	5,474	4.10
Amritsar	13	Majitha	72.81	Ganieve Majithia	SAD	57,027	46.69	Sukhjinder Raj Singh	AAP	30,965	25.35	26,062	21.34
Amritsar	14	Jandiala (SC)	70.60	Harbhajan E.T.O.	AAP	59,724	46.41	Sukhwinder Singh	INC	34,341	26.69	25,383	19.72
Amritsar	15	Amritsar North	61.15	Kunwar Vijay Pratap Singh	AAP	58,133	46.98	Anil Joshi	SAD	29,815	24.09	28,318	22.89
Amritsar	16	Amritsar West (SC)	55.28	Jasbir Sandhu	AAP	69,251	58.39	Raj Verka	INC	25,338	21.36	43,913	37.03
Amritsar	17	Amritsar Central	59.25	Ajay Gupta	AAP	40,837	46.83	Om Parkash Soni	INC	26,811	30.74	14,026	16.09
Amritsar	18	Amritsar East	64.17	Jeevan Jyot Kaur	AAP	39,679	36.74	Navjot Singh Sidhu	INC	32,929	30.49	6,750	6.25
Amritsar	19	Amritsar South	59.58	Inderbir Nijjar	AAP	53,053	50.10	Talbir Singh Gill	SAD	25,550	24.13	27,503	25.97
Amritsar	20	Attari (SC)	67.25	Jaswinder Singh	AAP	56,798	44.32	Gulzar Ranike	SAD	37,004	28.88	19,794	15.44
Tarn Taran	21	Tarn Taran	65.95	Kashmir Sohal	AAP	52,935	40.45	Harmeet Sandhu	SAD	39,347	30.06	13,588	10.39
Tarn Taran	22	Khem Karan	71.08	Sarvan Singh Dhun	AAP	64,541	41.64	Virsa Singh Valtoha	SAD	52,659	33.98	11,882	7.66
Tarn Taran	23	Patti	70.90	Laljit Bhullar	AAP	57,323	39.55	Adesh Partap Kairon	SAD	46,324	31.96	10,999	7.59
Tarn Taran	24	Sri Khadoor Sahib	71.37	Manjinder Lalpura	AAP	55,756	38.38	Ramanjit Singh Sikki	INC	39,265	27.03	16,491	11.35
Amritsar	25	Baba Bakala (SC)	65.02	Dalbir Singh Tong	AAP	52,468	39.98	Santokh Singh Bhalaipur	INC	32,916	25.08	19,552	14.90
Kapurthala	26	Bholath	66.14	Sukhpal Singh Khaira	INC	37,254	41.15	Jagir Kaur	SAD	28,029	30.96	9,225	10.19
Kapurthala	27	Kapurthala	68.41	Rana Gurjeet Singh	INC	44,096	42.94	Manju Rana	AAP	36,792	35.82	7,304	7.12
Kapurthala	28	Sultanpur Lodhi	72.80	Inder Pratap Singh	IND	41,337	38.24	Sajjan Singh Cheema	AAP	29,903	27.66	11,434	10.58
Kapurthala	29	Phagwara (SC)	66.28	Balwinder Dhaliwal	INC	37,217	29.08	Joginder Mann	AAP	34,505	26.96	2,712	2.12
Jalandhar	30	Phillaur (SC)	67.50	Vikramjit Chaudhary	INC	48,288	34.52	Baldev Singh Khaira	SAD	35,985	25.72	12,303	8.80
Jalandhar	31	Nakodar	68.83	Inderjit Kaur Mann	AAP	42,868	31.95	Gurpartap Wadala	SAD	39,999	29.81	2,869	2.14
Jalandhar	32	Shahkot	72.77	Hardev Singh Laddi	INC	51,661	38.99	Bachitar Singh Kohar	SAD	39,582	29.87	12,079	9.12
Jalandhar	33	Kartarpur (SC)	67.65	Balkar Singh	AAP	41,830	33.47	Ch. Surinder Singh	INC	37,256	29.81	4,574	3.66
Jalandhar	34	Jalandhar West (SC)	67.71	Sheetal Angural	AAP	39,213	33.73	Sushil Rinku	INC	34,960	30.07	4,253	3.66
Jalandhar	35	Jalandhar Central	61.14	Raman Arora	AAP	33,011	30.98	Rajinder Beri	INC	32,764	30.75	247	0.23
Jalandhar	36	Jalandhar North	66.69	Avtar Singh Jr.	INC	47,338	36.94	K. D. Bhandari	BJP	37,852	29.54	9,486	7.40
Jalandhar	37	Jalandhar Cnt.	64.48	Pargat Singh	INC	40,816	32.63	Surinder Sodhi	AAP	35,008	27.99	5,808	4.64
Jalandhar	38	Adampur (SC)	67.74	Sukhwinder Kotli	INC	39,554	34.77	Pawan Kumar Tinu	SAD	34,987	30.76	4,567	4.01
Hoshiarpur	39	Mukerian	68.87	Jangi Lal Mahajan	BJP	41,044	28.64	Gurdhian Multani	AAP	38,353	26.76	2,691	1.88
Hoshiarpur	40	Dasuya	66.27	Karambir Singh	AAP	43,272	32.42	Arun Dogra	INC	34,685	25.99	8,587	6.43
Hoshiarpur	41	Urmar	68.39	Jasvir Raja Gill	AAP	42,576	34.01	Sangat Gilzian	INC	38,386	30.66	4,190	3.35
Hoshiarpur	42	Sham Chaurasi (SC)	69.32	Ravjot Singh	AAP	60,730	48.97	Pawan Kumar Adia	INC	39,374	31.75	21,356	17.22
Hoshiarpur	43	Hoshiarpur	66.19	Brahm Shankar Jimpa	AAP	51,112	39.96	Sunder Sham Arora	INC	37,253	29.13	13,859	10.83
Hoshiarpur	44	Chabbewal (SC)	71.22	Raj Kumar	INC	47,375	41.02	Harminder Singh	AAP	39,729	34.40	7,646	6.62
Hoshiarpur	45	Garhshankar	69.47	Jai Krishan Singh	AAP	32,341	26.41	Amarpreet Singh Lally	INC	28,162	22.99	4,179	3.42
S. B. S. Nagar	46	Banga (SC)	69.71	Sukhwinder Kumar	SAD	37,338	32.38	Tarlochan Singh	INC	32,269	27.99	5,069	4.39
S. B. S. Nagar	47	Nawan Shahr	69.82	Nachhatar Pal	BSP	37,031	29.90	Lalit Mohan Ballu	AAP	31,655	25.56	5,376	4.34
S. B. S. Nagar	48	Balachaur	73.59	Santosh Kataria	AAP	39,633	34.47	Sunita Rani	SAD	35,092	30.52	4,541	3.95
Rupnagar	49	Anandpur Sahib	73.19	Harjot Singh Bains	AAP	82,132	57.92	Rana K. P. Singh	INC	36,352	25.63	45,780	32.29
Rupnagar	50	Rupnagar	73.20	Dinesh Chadha	AAP	59,903	44.11	Brinder Dhillon	INC	36,271	26.71	23,632	17.40
Rupnagar	51	Chamkaur Sahib (SC)	74.43	Charanjit Singh	AAP	70,248	47.60	Charanjit Channi	INC	62,306	42.22	7,942	5.38
S. A. S. Nagar	52	Kharar	66.12	Anmol Gagan Maan	AAP	78,273	44.30	Ranjit Singh Gill	SAD	40,388	22.86	37,885	21.44
S. A. S. Nagar	53	S.A.S. Nagar	64.84	Kulwant Singh	AAP	77,134	49.70	Balbir Singh Sidhu	INC	43,037	27.73	34,097	21.97
Fatehgarh Sahib	54	Bassi Pathana (SC)	74.84	Rupinder Singh	AAP	54,018	48.17	Gurpreet Singh	INC	16,177	14.43	37,841	33.74
Fatehgarh Sahib	55	Fatehgarh Sahib	77.37	Lakhbir Rai	AAP	57,706	45.98	Kuljit Nagra	INC	25,507	20.32	32,199	25.66
Fatehgarh Sahib	56	Amloh	78.74	Gurinder Singh	AAP	52,912	46.43	Gurpreet Singh Khanna	SAD	28,249	24.79	24,663	21.64
Ludhiana	57	Khanna	74.74	Tarunpreet Sond	AAP	62,425	48.55	Jasdeep Kaur Yadu	SAD	26,805	20.85	35,620	27.70
Ludhiana	58	Samrala	75.65	Jagtar Singh	AAP	57,557	43.11	Paramjit Singh Dhillon	SAD	26,667	19.97	30,890	23.14
Ludhiana	59	Sahnewal	67.52	Hardeep Mundian	AAP	61,515	34.33	Vikram Singh Bajwa	INC	46,322	25.85	15,193	8.48
Ludhiana	60	Ludhiana East	66.33	Daljit Singh Grewal	AAP	68,682	47.54	Sanjeev Talwar	INC	32,760	22.67	35,922	24.87
Ludhiana	61	Ludhiana South	59.13	Rajinder Pal Kaur	AAP	43,811	41.56	Satinderpal Tajpuri	BJP	17,673	16.76	26,138	24.80
Ludhiana	62	Atam Nagar	61.56	Kulwant Singh Sidhu	AAP	44,601	42.44	Kamaljit Singh Karwal	INC	28,247	26.88	16,354	15.56
Ludhiana	63	Ludhiana Central	61.91	Ashok Parashar Pappi	AAP	32,789	33.32	Gurdev Sharma Debi	BJP	27,985	28.44	4,804	4.88
Ludhiana	64	Ludhiana West	64.29	Gurpreet Gogi	AAP	40,443	34.46	Bharat Bhushan Ashu	INC	32,931	28.06	7,512	6.40
Ludhiana	65	Ludhiana North	61.37	Madan Lal Bagga	AAP	51,104	40.59	Parveen Bansal	BJP	35,822	28.45	15,282	12.14
Ludhiana	66	Gill (SC)	67.32	Jiwan Singh Sangowal	AAP	92,696	50.33	Darshan Singh Shivalik	SAD	35,052	19.03	57,644	31.30
Ludhiana	67	Payal (SC)	76.26	Manwinder Singh	AAP	63,633	50.18	Lakhvir Singh	INC	30,624	24.15	33,009	26.03
Ludhiana	68	Dakha	75.73	Manpreet Singh Ayali	SAD	49,909	34.97	Sandeep Singh Sandhu	INC	44,102	30.90	5,807	4.07
Ludhiana	69	Raikot (SC)	72.27	Hakam Singh Thekedar	AAP	63,659	56.04	Kamil Amar Singh	INC	36,015	31.70	27,644	24.34
Ludhiana	70	Jagraon (SC)	67.69	Sarvjit Kaur Manuke	AAP	65,195	51.95	S.R. Kaler	SAD	25,539	20.35	39,656	31.60
Moga	71	Nihal Singh Wala (SC)	71.07	Manjit Singh Bilaspur	AAP	65,156	46.11	Bhupinder Singh Sahoke	INC	27,172	19.23	37,984	26.88
Moga	72	Bhagha Purana	77.07	Amritpal Singh	AAP	67,143	50.40	Tirath Singh Mahla	SAD	33,384	25.06	33,759	25.34
Moga	73	Moga	70.73	Amandeep Arora	AAP	59,149	41.01	Malvika Sood	INC	38,234	26.51	20,915	14.50
Moga	74	Dharamkot	78.00	Devinderjeet Singh	AAP	65,378	45.97	Sukhjit Singh	INC	35,406	24.90	29,972	21.07
Ferozpur	75	Zira	80.30	Naresh Kataria	AAP	64,034	42.35	Janmeja Singh Sekhon	SAD	41,258	27.29	22,776	15.06
Ferozpur	76	Firozpur City	71.81	Ranbir Singh	AAP	48,443	38.91	Parminder Singh Pinki	INC	28,874	23.19	19,569	15.72
Ferozpur	77	Firozpur Rural (SC)	77.19	Rajneesh Kumar Dahiya	AAP	75,293	49.56	Joginder Singh Jindu	SAD	47,547	31.30	27,746	18.26
Ferozpur	78	Guru Har Sahai	80.46	Fauja Singh	AAP	68,343	49.02	Vardev Singh	SAD	57,769	41.44	10,574	7.58
Fazilka	79	Jalalabad	80.59	Jagdeep Kamboj	AAP	91,455	52.95	Sukhbir Singh Badal	SAD	60,525	35.04	30,930	17.91
Fazilka	80	Fazilka	81.54	Narinder Pal Singh Sawna	AAP	63,157	43.49	Surjit Kumar Jyani	BJP	35,437	24.40	27,720	19.09
Fazilka	81	Abohar	74.47	Sandeep Jakhar	INC	49,924	37.51	Kuldeep Kumar	AAP	44,453	33.40	5,471	4.11
Fazilka	82	Balluana (SC)	78.06	Amandeep Singh Musafir	AAP	58,893	40.91	Vandana Sangwal	BJP	39,720	27.59	19,173	13.32
Sri Muktsar Sahib	83	Lambi	81.83	Gurmeet Singh Khudian	AAP	66,313	48.87	Parkash Singh Badal	SAD	54,917	40.47	11,396	8.40
Sri Muktsar Sahib	84	Gidderbaha	85.69	Amrinder Singh Warring	INC	50,998	35.47	Hardeep Dhillon	SAD	49,649	34.53	1,349	0.94
Sri Muktsar Sahib	85	Malout (SC)	78.66	Dr. Baljit Kaur	AAP	77,370	55.60	Harpreet Singh	SAD	37,109	26.67	40,261	28.93
Sri Muktsar Sahib	86	Muktsar	78.93	Jagdeep Singh	AAP	76,321	51.09	Kanwarjit Singh	SAD	42,127	28.20	34,194	22.89
Faridkot	87	Faridkot	76.16	Gurdit Singh Sekhon	AAP	53,484	41.18	Parambans Singh	SAD	36,687	28.25	16,797	12.93
Faridkot	88	Kotkapura	76.93	Kultar Singh Sandhwan	AAP	54,009	43.81	Ajaipal Singh Sandhu	INC	32,879	26.67	21,130	17.14
Faridkot	89	Jaitu (SC)	76.63	Amolak Singh	AAP	60,242	51.79	Manjit Singh	SAD	27,453	23.60	32,789	28.19
Bathinda	90	Rampura Phul	79.74	Balkar Singh Sidhu	AAP	56,155	41.26	Sikander Singh Maluka	SAD	45,745	33.61	10,410	7.65
Bathinda	91	Bhucho Mandi (SC)	80.64	Jagsir Singh	AAP	85,778	57.29	Darshan Singh Kotfatta	SAD	35,566	23.75	50,212	33.54
Bathinda	92	Bathinda Urban	70.78	Jagroop Singh Gill	AAP	93,057	57.20	Manpreet Singh Badal	INC	29,476	18.12	63,581	39.08
Bathinda	93	Bathinda Rural (SC)	78.31	Amit Rattan Kotfatta	AAP	66,096	53.13	Parkash Singh Bhatti	SAD	30,617	24.61	35,479	28.52
Bathinda	94	Talwandi Sabo	83.73	Prof. Baljinder Kaur	AAP	48,753	37.04	Jeetmohinder Sidhu	SAD	33,501	25.46	15,252	11.58
Bathinda	95	Maur	80.56	Sukhveer Maiserkhana	AAP	63,099	46.37	Lakha Singh Sidhana	IND	28,091	20.64	35,008	25.73
Mansa	96	Mansa	79.25	Dr. Vijay Singla	AAP	1,00,023	57.57	Sidhu Moose Wala	INC	36,700	21.12	63,323	36.45
Mansa	97	Sardulgarh	83.60	Gurpreet Singh Banawali	AAP	75,817	49.61	Bikram Singh	INC	34,446	22.54	41,371	27.07
Mansa	98	Budhlada (SC)	81.64	Budh Ram	AAP	88,282	55.04	Nishan Hakamwala	SAD	36,591	22.81	51,691	32.23
Sangrur	99	Lehra	79.63	Barinder Km. Goyal	AAP	60,058	43.59	Parminder Dhindsa	SADS	33,540	24.34	26,518	19.25
Sangrur	100	Dirba (SC)	79.03	Harpal Singh Cheema	AAP	82,630	56.89	Gulzar Singh Moonak	SAD	31,975	22.01	50,655	34.88
Sangrur	101	Sunam	78.54	Aman Arora	AAP	94,794	61.28	Jaswinder Dhiman	INC	19,517	12.62	75,277	48.66
Sangrur	102	Bhadaur	78.98	Labh Singh Ugoke	AAP	63,967	51.07	Charanjit Singh Channi	INC	26,409	21.09	37,558	29.98
Sangrur	103	Barnala	71.81	Gurmeet Singh Hayer	AAP	64,800	49.27	Kulwant Singh Keetu	SAD	27,178	20.66	37,622	28.61
Sangrur	104	Mehal Kalan (SC)	71.54	Kulwant Singh Pandori	AAP	53,714	46.52	Gurjant Singh Kattu	SAD(M)	23,367	20.24	30,347	26.28
Sangrur	105	Malerkotla	78.59	Md. Jamil Rahman	AAP	65,948	52.32	Razia Sultana	INC	44,262	35.12	21,686	17.20
Barnala	106	Amargarh	77.95	Jaswant Gajjanmajra	AAP	44,523	34.28	Simranjit Singh Mann	SAD(M)	38,480	29.63	6,043	4.65
Barnala	107	Dhuri	77.32	Bhagwant Mann	AAP	82,592	64.29	Dalvir Singh Goldy	INC	24,386	18.98	58,206	45.31
Barnala	108	Sangrur	76.04	Narinder Kaur Bharaj	AAP	74,851	51.67	Vijay Inder Singla	INC	38,421	26.52	36,430	25.15
Patiala	109	Nabha (SC)	77.07	Gurdev Singh Dev Maan	AAP	82,053	57.45	Kabir Dass	SAD	29,453	20.62	52,600	36.83
Patiala	110	Patiala Rural	65.58	Dr. Balbir Singh	AAP	77,155	52.05	Mohit Mohindra	INC	23,681	15.97	53,474	36.08
Patiala	111	Rajpura	74.86	Neena Mittal	AAP	54,834	40.10	Jagdish Kumar Jagga	BJP	32,341	23.65	22,493	16.45
S. A. S. Nagar	112	Dera Bassi	69.18	Kuljit Singh Randhawa	AAP	70,032	35.10	Deepinder Singh Dhillon	INC	48,311	24.21	21,721	10.89
Patiala	113	Ghanaur	78.97	Gurlal Ghanaur	AAP	62,783	48.14	Madan Lal	INC	31,018	23.78	31,765	24.36
Patiala	114	Sanour	73.79	Harmeet Pathanmajra	AAP	83,893	50.84	Harinder Chandumajra	SAD	34,771	21.07	49,122	29.77
Patiala	115	Patiala	64.02	Ajit Pal Kohli	AAP	48,104	46.49	Amarinder Singh	PLC	28,231	27.28	19,873	19.21
Patiala	116	Samana	76.80	Chetan Jauramajra	AAP	74,375	50.14	Surjit Rakhra	SAD	34,662	23.37	39,713	26.77
Patiala	117	Shutrana (SC)	75.54	Kw. Singh Bazigar	AAP	81,751	59.35	Vaninder Loomba	SAD	30,197	21.92	51,554	37.43

== Government formation ==
On 10 March, the election results were announced. The Aam Aadmi Party gained a full majority in the sixteenth Punjab Legislative Assembly by winning 92 seats out of 117 total. The opposition parties are the Indian National Congress, the Bharatiya Janata Party, the Shiromani Akali Dal, and the Bahujan Samaj Party.

On 11 March 2022, AAP Punjab convener and MP Bhagwant Mann was elected by the AAP legislative members as their leader in the assembly. Mann took oath as the Chief Minister in the Punjab government in a public ceremony at Khatkar Kalan village on 16 March, when the term of the incumbent Fifteenth Punjab Legislative Assembly expired. 10 cabinet ministers took oath on 19 March at Guru Nanak Dev auditorium of Punjab Raj Bhavan in Chandigarh. Eight ministers who took oath were greenhorn (first term) Members of Legislative Assembly (MLA) while two were in their second term.

The cabinet can have at most 18 ministers, but Mann decided to appoint a smaller cabinet. Mann has set targets for every minister to achieve, saying people "can demand that the minister be removed" if the targets are not met.

Party	Seats Retained	Seats Lost	Seats Gained	Final Count
Aam Aadmi Party	18	▼2	▲74	92
Indian National Congress	11	▼65	▲7	18
Shiromani Akali Dal	2	▼13	▲1	3

== Bypolls 2022–2026 ==
Date	Constituency		Previous MLA		Reason	Elected MLA	
10 July 2024	34	Jalandhar West	Sheetal Angural	Aam Aadmi Party	Resigned on 28 March 2024	Mohinder Bhagat	Aam Aadmi Party
20 November 2024	44	Chabbewal	Raj Kumar Chabbewal	Indian National Congress	Resigned on 15 March 2024	Ishank Kumar	Aam Aadmi Party
20 November 2024	10	Dera Baba Nanak	Sukhjinder Singh Randhawa	Indian National Congress	Elected to Lok Sabha on 4 June 2024	Gurdeep Singh Randhawa	Aam Aadmi Party
20 November 2024	84	Gidderbaha	Amrinder Singh Raja Warring	Indian National Congress	Elected to Lok Sabha on 4 June 2024	Hardeep Singh Dimpy Dhillon	Aam Aadmi Party
20 November 2024	103	Barnala	Gurmeet Singh Meet Hayer	Aam Aadmi Party	Elected to Lok Sabha on 4 June 2024	Kuldeep Singh Dhillon	Indian National Congress
19 June 2025	64	Ludhiana West	Gurpreet Gogi	Aam Aadmi Party	Died on 11 January 2025	Sanjeev Arora	Aam Aadmi Party
11 November 2025	21	Tarn Taran	Kashmir Singh Sohal	Aam Aadmi Party	Died on 27 June 2025	Harmeet Singh Sandhu	Aam Aadmi Party

== See also ==
- Sixteenth Punjab Legislative Assembly
- 2022 elections in India
- Elections in Punjab
- Politics of Punjab
- List of incumbent MPs from Punjab
- 2019 Indian general election in Punjab
- 2024 Indian general election in Punjab
- 2024 Punjab, India local elections
