= Dharambir =

Dharambir may refer to:

- Dharambir Singh Chaudhary (born 1955), Indian politician and member of Lok Sabha for Bhiwani-Mahendragarh, Haryana
- Dharambir Agnihotri (1946–2022), Indian politician and member of Punjab Legislative Assembly
- Dharambir Nain (born 1989), Indian Paralympic athlete
- Dharambir Singh (born 1990), Indian sprinter
- Dharam Bir Sinha, Indian politician and member of Lok Sabha for Barh, Bihar
