= Prem Singh Lalpur =

Indian politician (1925–2011)

Member of the Punjab Legislative Assembly
- In office 1980-1985, 1985-1992 – 1997-2002; Three terms.
- Preceded by: Dilbag Singh
- Succeeded by: Harmeet Singh Sandhu
- Constituency: Tarn Taran Assembly Constituency

President of Shiromani Gurdwara Prabandhak Committee
- In office 16 November 1958 – 7 March 1960
- Preceded by: Tara Singh
- Succeeded by: Tara Singh

Personal details
- Born: 26 February 1925 Lalpur Village, Amritsar, British India
- Died: 9 March 2011 (aged 86) Amritsar
- Party: Shiromani Akali Dal (till 2004); Indian National Congress (2006-2011)
- Occupation: Politician

Prem Singh Lalpur (1925-2011) was an Indian politician from the state of Punjab and was a three term member of the Punjab Legislative Assembly. Between 1958-1960, Lalpur served as president of the Shiromani Gurdwara Parbandhak Committee where he defeated longtime SGPC leader, Tara Singh. Elected at the age of 33, Lalpur was the youngest SGPC president in the organization's history.

== Constituency ==
Lalpur represented the Tarn Taran Assembly Constituency of Punjab.

== Political Party ==
Lalpur was a member of Shiromani Akali Dal.
