= Tarn Taran Assembly constituency =

Constituency of the Punjab legislative assembly in India

Coordinates: 31.46°N 74.93°E

Tarn Taran
- Constituency No. 21 for the Punjab Legislative Assembly

Constituency details
- Country: India
- State: Punjab
- District: Tarn Taran
- Lok Sabha constituency: Khadoor Sahib
- Total electors: 198,446
- Reservation: None

Member of Legislative Assembly
- 16th Punjab Legislative Assembly
- Incumbent Harmeet Singh Sandhu
- Party: Aam Aadmi Party
- Elected year: 2025

Tarn Taran Assembly constituency is one of the 117 Legislative Assembly constituencies of Punjab state in India. It is located in the Tarn Taran district. Kashmir Singh Sohal from Aam Aadmi Party was the MLA from Tarn Taran (Deceased on 27 June 2025), elected in 2022 Punjab Legislative Assembly election.

== Members of the Legislative Assembly ==
Most successful parties from Tarn Taran Vidhan Sabha
1. SAD (8 Times) (40.0%)
2. INC (7 Times) (35.0%)
3. AAP (2 Times) (10.0%)
4. AD – SFS (1 Time) (5.00%)
5. CPI (1 Time) (5.00%)
6. IND (1 Time) (5.00%)

| Year | Member | Party |
|---|---|---|
| 1952 | Mohan Singh | Indian National Congress |
| 1952 | Darshan Singh | Communist Party of India |
| 1957 | Gurdial Singh Dhillon | Indian National Congress |
| 1957 | Naranjan Singh | Indian National Congress |
| 1962 | Gurdial Singh Dhillon | Indian National Congress |
| 1967 | H. Singh | Akali Dal – Sant Fateh Singh Group |
| 1967★ | Manjinder Singh | Shiromani Akali Dal |
| 1969 | Manjinder Singh | Shiromani Akali Dal |
| 1972 | Dilbag Singh | Indian National Congress |
| 1977 | Manjinder Singh Behla | Independent |
| 1980 | Prem Singh Lalpur | Shiromani Akali Dal |
| 1985 | Prem Singh Lalpur | Shiromani Akali Dal |
| 1992 | Dilbag Singh | Indian National Congress |
| 1997 | Prem Singh Lalpur | Shiromani Akali Dal |
| 2002 | Harmeet Singh Sandhu | Shiromani Akali Dal |
| 2007 | Harmeet Singh Sandhu | Shiromani Akali Dal |
| 2012 | Harmeet Singh Sandhu | Shiromani Akali Dal |
| 2017 | Dharambir Agnihotri | Indian National Congress |
| 2022 | Kashmir Singh Sohal | Aam Aadmi Party |
| 2025★ | Harmeet Singh Sandhu | Aam Aadmi Party |

★By-Election

== Election results ==
=== 2027 ===
Punjab Assembly election, 2027: Tarn Taran
| Party | Candidate | Votes | % | ±% |
|---|---|---|---|---|
| AAP | Harmeet Singh Sandhu | | | |
| AD (WPD) | | | | New entry |
| INC | | | | |
| BSP | | | | |
| SAD | | | | |
| BJP | | | | |
| NOTA | None of the above | | | |
| Majority | | | | |
| Turnout | | | | |

=== 2025 by-election ===
Punjab Legislative Assembly by-election 2025: Tarn Taran
| Party | Candidate | Votes | % | ±% |
|---|---|---|---|---|
| AAP | Harmeet Singh Sandhu | 42,649 | 36.23 | ▼4.22 |
| SAD | Sukhwinder Kaur Randhawa | 30,558 | 25.96 | ▼4.1 |
| IND | Mandeep Singh Khalsa | 19,620 | 16.67 | New entry |
| INC | Karanbir Singh Burj | 15,078 | 12.81 | ▼7.47 |
| BJP | Harjit Singh Sandhu | 6,239 | 5.30 | ▲4.40 |
| NOTA | None of the above | 609 | 0.52 | ▼0.08 |
| Majority | | 12,091 | 10.27 | ▼0.12 |
| Turnout | | 117,713 | 60.95 | ▼5.05 |
| Registered electors | | 193,742 | | |
| AAP hold | | Swing | | |

=== 2022 ===
2022 Punjab Legislative Assembly election: Tarn Taran
| Party | Candidate | Votes | % | ±% |
|---|---|---|---|---|
| AAP | Kashmir Singh Sohal | 52,935 | 40.45 | ▲23.15 |
| SAD | Harmeet Singh Sandhu | 39,347 | 30.06 | ▼4.04 |
| INC | Dharambir Agnihotri | 26,535 | 20.28 | ▼24.82 |
| SAD(A) | Amritpal Singh Mehron | 6,363 | 4.86 | ▲4.06 |
| IND | Sukhmandeep Singh Dhillon | 1,315 | 1.00 | ▲1.00 |
| BJP | Navrat Singh Shafipura | 1,176 | 0.90 | New entry |
| NOTA | None of the above | 1,168 | 0.6 | |
| Majority | | 13,588 | 10.39 | |
| Turnout | | 130,874 | 66.0 | |
| Registered electors | | 198,439 | | |
| AAP gain from INC | | Swing | | |

=== 2017 ===
Punjab Assembly election, 2017: Tarn Taran
| Party | Candidate | Votes | % | ±% |
|---|---|---|---|---|
| INC | Dharambir Agnihotri | 59,794 | 45.10 | ▲7.4 |
| SAD | Harmeet Singh Sandhu | 45,165 | 34.10 | ▼7.5 |
| AAP | Kartar Singh Pehalwan | 22,950 | 17.30 | new |
| CPI(M) | Sukhdev Singh | 1,115 | 0.80 | new |
| SAD(A) | Gurjinder Singh | 992 | 0.80 | new |
| NOTA | None of the above | 838 | 0.5 | |
| Majority | | 14,629 | 11.1 | |
| Turnout | | 131,735 | 72.2 | |
| Registered electors | | 183,576 | | |
| INC gain from SAD | | Swing | | |

=== 2012 ===
Punjab Assembly election, 2012: Tarn Taran
| Party | Candidate | Votes | % | ±% |
|---|---|---|---|---|
| SAD | Harmeet Singh Sandhu | 50,009 | 41.6 | ▼7.1 |
| INC | Dharambir Agnihotri | 45,388 | 37.7 | ▲6.9 |
| Independent | Davinder Singh Sandhu Laali Dhalla | 18,014 | 14.90 | new |
| Majority | | 4,621 | 3.8 | |
| Turnout | | 120,124 | 77.1 | |
| Registered electors | | 155,837 | | |
| INC gain from SAD | | Swing | | |

=== 2007 ===
Punjab Assembly election, 2007: Tarn Taran
| Party | Candidate | Votes | % | ±% |
|---|---|---|---|---|
| SAD | Harmeet Singh Sandhu | 44,841 | 48.7 | |
| INC | Manjit Singh | 28,307 | 30.8 | |
| LBP | Amrik Singh | 14,935 | 16.2 | |
| Majority | | 16,534 | 18.0 | |
| Turnout | | 92,015 | 65.7 | |
| Registered electors | | 140,073 | | |
| INC gain from SAD | | Swing | | |

== See also ==
- List of constituencies of the Punjab Legislative Assembly
- Tarn Taran district
