= Mehal Kalan Assembly constituency =

Legislative Assembly constituency in Punjab State, India

Coordinates: 30.53°N 75.56°E

Mehal Kalan
- Constituency No. 104 for the Punjab Legislative Assembly

Constituency details
- Country: India
- State: Punjab
- District: Barnala
- Lok Sabha constituency: Sangrur
- Established: 2006
- Total electors: 161,387 (in 2022)
- Reservation: SC

Member of Legislative Assembly
- 16th Punjab Legislative Assembly
- Incumbent Kulwant Singh Pandori
- Party: Aam Aadmi Party
- Elected year: 2017

Mehal Kalan is one of the 117 Legislative Assembly constituencies of Punjab state in India. It is part of Barnala district and is reserved for candidates belonging to the Scheduled Castes. Kulwant Singh Pandori of the Aam Aadmi Party is the current MLA of this constituency.

== Members of the Legislative Assembly ==
Most successful parties from Mehal Kalan Vidhan Sabha
1. AAP (2 Times) (33.3%)
2. CPI (2 Times) (33.3%)
3. INC (1 Time) (16.7%)
4. SAD (1 Time) (16.7%)

Year	Member	Party
As part of PEPSU Legislative Assembly (1951–56)
1952	Dhanna Singh	Shiromani Akali Dal
1952	Arjan Singh	Communist Party of India
Constituency defunct (1954-1962)
As part of Punjab Legislative Assembly (1962–Present)
1962	Harnam Singh	Communist Party of India
Constituency defunct (1967-2012) (Part of Sherpur constituency)
2012	Harchand Kaur	Indian National Congress
2017	Kulwant Singh Pandori	Aam Aadmi Party
2022	Kulwant Singh Pandori	Aam Aadmi Party

== Election results ==
=== 2027 ===
Punjab Assembly election, 2027: Mehal Kalan
Party	Candidate	Votes	%	±%
AAP	Kulwant Singh Pandori			
AD (WPD)				New entry
INC				
BSP				
SAD				New entry
BJP				New entry
NOTA	None of the above			
Majority				
Turnout				

=== 2022 ===
Punjab Assembly election, 2022: Mehal Kalan
Party	Candidate	Votes	%	±%
AAP	Kulwant Singh Pandori	53,714	46.52	▲
SAD(A)	Gurjant Singh Kattu	23,367	20.24	▲
INC	Harchand Kaur	17,545	15.2	▼
BSP	Chamkaur Singh	10,394	9.0	▲
SAD(S)	Sant Sukhwinder Singh Tibba	3,138	2.7	
NOTA	None of the above	805	0.7	▼
Majority		30,347	26.28	▲
Turnout		115,462	71.54	▼
Registered electors		161,387		
AAP hold		Swing		

=== 2017 ===
Punjab Assembly election, 2017: Mehal Kalan
Party	Candidate	Votes	%	±%
AAP	Kulwant Singh Pandori	57,551	46.12	+46.12
SAD	Ajit Singh Shant	30487	24.43	
INC	Harchand kaur	25,688	20.59	−24.13%
BSP	Makhan Singh	4922	3.94	
Independent	Gobind Singh	3183	2.55	
CPI	Khusia Singh	1177	0.74	
Independent	Gurmail Singh	892	0.71	
Independent	Darbara Singh	341	0.27	
APP	Gurmit Singh	306	0.25	
BMUP	Sarabjit Singh	236	0.19	
NOTA	None of the above	924	0.74	
Majority		27,064	21.53	+14.94
Turnout		125707	80.84	
Registered electors		155,500		
AAP gain from INC		Swing	+35.13	

=== 2012 ===
Punjab Legislative Assembly Election, 2012: Mehal Kalan
Party	Candidate	Votes	%	±%
INC	Harchand Kaur	50,188	44.72	N/A
SAD	Gobind Singh	42797	38.13	N/A
PPoP	Raj	8820	7.86	N/A
BSP	Atma	7030	6.26	N/A
SAD(M)	Amarjit	2247	2.00	N/A
Majority		7391	6.59	N/A
Turnout		112232	80.82	N/A
Registered electors		138,869		New
INC win (new seat)				

== See also ==
- List of constituencies of the Punjab Legislative Assembly
- Barnala district
