= Kulwant Singh Pandori =

Indian politician from Punjab

Punjab Legislative Assembly
- Incumbent
- Assumed office 2017
- Preceded by: Harchand Kaur
- Constituency: Mehal Kalan

Personal details
- Born: 5 January 1973 (age 53) Pandori
- Party: Aam Aadmi Party
- Spouse: Jaswinder Kaur
- Profession: Journalist, Politician

Kulwant Singh Pandori (born 5 January 1973) is an Indian politician and a member of Aam Aadmi Party. In 2017, he was elected as the member of the Punjab Legislative Assembly from Mehal Kalan Assembly constituency.

He was born on 5 January 1973 in Pandori in Punjab, India. He worked as a journalist and served as the incharge of Malwa region for newspapers namely Ajit, Rozana Spokesman and Pehredaar.

== Political career ==
Pandori is a member of the Aam Aadmi Party.

== Member of Legislative Assembly first term ==
Pandori as an MLA represents the Mehal Kalan Assembly constituency. Pandori won the 2017 Punjab Legislative Assembly election from Mehal Kalan on an Aam Aadmi Party ticket. He defeated Ajit Singh Shant of the Shiromani Akali Dal by over 27064 votes.

Committee assignments of Punjab Legislative Assembly

- Member (2017–18) of Subordinate Legislation Committee
- Member (2018–19) of Library Committee

== Member of Legislative Assembly Second term ==
He represents the Mehal Kalan Assembly constituency as MLA in Punjab Assembly. The Aam Aadmi Party gained a strong 79% majority in the sixteenth Punjab Legislative Assembly by winning 92 out of 117 seats in the 2022 Punjab Legislative Assembly election. MP Bhagwant Mann was sworn in as Chief Minister on 16 March 2022.

Committee assignments of Punjab Legislative Assembly

- Chairman (2022–23) Committee on Privileges

== Electoral performance ==
Punjab Assembly election, 2017: Mehal Kalan
Party	Candidate	Votes	%	±%
AAP	Kulwant Singh Pandori	57,551	46.12	+46.12
SAD	Ajit Singh Shant	30487	24.43	
INC	Harchand kaur	25,688	20.59	−24.13%
BSP	Makhan Singh	4922	3.94	
Independent	Gobind Singh	3183	2.55	
CPI	Khusia Singh	1177	0.74	
Independent	Gurmail Singh	892	0.71	
Independent	Darbara Singh	341	0.27	
APP	Gurmit Singh	306	0.25	
BMUP	Sarabjit Singh	236	0.19	
NOTA	None of the above	924	0.74	
Majority		27,064	21.53	+14.94
Turnout		125707	80.84	
Registered electors		155,500		
AAP gain from INC		Swing	+35.13	

Punjab Assembly election, 2022: Mehal Kalan
Party	Candidate	Votes	%	±%
AAP	Kulwant Singh Pandori	53,714	46.52	▲
SAD(A)	Gurjant Singh Kattu	23,367	20.24	▲
INC	Harchand Kaur	17,545	15.2	▼
BSP	Chamkaur Singh	10,394	9.0	▲
SAD(S)	Sant Sukhwinder Singh Tibba	3,138	2.7	
NOTA	None of the above	805	0.7	▼
Majority		30,347	26.28	▲
Turnout		115,462	71.54	▼
Registered electors		161,387		
AAP hold		Swing		

State Legislative Assembly
Preceded by Harchand Kaur	Member of the Punjab Legislative Assembly from Mehal Kalan Assembly constituency 2017 –	Incumbent
