= Punjab Assembly Committee on Estimates =

Indian Legislative committee

Committee on Estimates
Committee of the House
- 16th Punjab Assembly
- State: Punjab

Leadership
- Chaiperson: Aman Arora
- Chairperson party: Aam Aadmi Party
- Appointer: Punjab Assembly speaker

Structure
- Seats: 13
- Political Parties: AAP (11); INC (2)
- Election criteria: The members are elected every year from amongst its members of house according to the principle of proportional representation.
- Tenure: 1 Year

Jurisdiction
- Purpose: Legislative oversight of the government estimates

Rules & Procedure
- Applicable rules: Article 208 of the Constitution of India section 32 of the States Reorganisation Act, 1956; Rules 232(1) and 2(b) of Rules of Procedure and Conduct of Business in Punjab Legislative Assembly

Punjab Assembly Committee on Estimates of Punjab Legislative Assembly is constituted annually for a one-year period from among the members of the Assembly.

== Functions ==
The functions of the Committee on Estimates is:

1. to report what economics, improvements in organizations, efficiency or administrative reform, consistent with the policy underlying the estimates, may be effected;
2. to suggest alternative policies in order to bring about efficiency and economy in administration;
3. to examine whether the money is well laid out within the limits of the policy implied in the estimates; and
4. to suggest the form in which the estimates shall be presented to the House; Provided that the Committee shall not exercise its functions in relation to such public undertakings as are allotted to the Committee on public undertakings by these Rules or by the Speaker.

== Appointment ==
The speaker appoints the committee and its members every year for a one-year term according to the powers conferred by Article 208 of the Constitution of India read with section 32 of the States Reorganisation Act, 1956 (37 of 1956), and in pursuance of Rules 232(1) and 2(b) of the Rules of Procedure and Conduct of Business in the Punjab Legislative Assembly.

== Members ==
For the 1-year period starting May 2022, the Committee on Estimates of 16th Punjab Assembly had following members:

Committee on Estimates (2022–23)
Sr. No.	Name	Post	Party
1.	Aman Arora	Chairperson	AAP
2.	Amansher Singh (Shery kalsi)	Member	AAP
3.	Amolak Singh	Member	AAP
4.	Balkar Singh Sidhu	Member	AAP
5.	Barindermeet Singh Pahra	Member	INC
6.	Gurpreet Bassi Gogi	Member	AAP
7.	Harmit Singh Pathanmajra	Member	AAP
8.	Jagtar Singh Diyalpura	Member	AAP
9.	Kashmir Singh Sohal	Member	AAP
10.	Kulwant Singh Sidhu	Member	AAP
11.	Raman Arora	Member	AAP
12.	Santosh Kumari Kataria	Member	AAP
13.	Sukhjinder Singh Randhawa	Member	INC

== Chairpersons ==
Tenure	Terms	Name	Political party
2021-22	1	Hardial Singh Kamboj	Indian National Congress
2022–23	1	Aman Arora	Aam Aadmi Party

== Previous members ==
For the one-year period before May 2022, the Committee on Estimates of 15th Punjab Assembly had following members:

=== 2021–22 ===
Committee on Estimates (2021–22)
Sr. No.	Name	Post	Party
1.	Sardar Hardial Singh Kamboj	Chairperson	INC
2.	Sardar Amrinder Singh Raja Warring	Member	INC
3.	Sardar Angad Singh	Member	INC
4.	Sardar Dilraj Singh Bhunder	Member	INC
5.	Sardar Gurpartap Singh Wadala	Member	INC
6.	Sardar Kanwar Sandhu	Member	INC
7.	Shri Madan Lal Jalalpur	Member	INC
8.	Sardar Nirmal Singh	Member	INC
9.	Shri Rakesh Pandey	Member	INC
10.	Sardar Randeep Singh Nabha	Member	INC
11.	Sardar Sukhpal Singh Bhullar	Member	INC
12.	Sardar Sukhpal Singh Khaira	Member	INC
13.	Shri Surinder Kumar Dawar	Member	

=== 2020–21 ===
Committee on Estimates (2020–21)
Sr. No.	Name	Post	Party
1.	Sardar Hardial Singh Kamboj	Chairperson	INC
2.	Sardar Amrinder Singh Raja Warring	Member	INC
3.	Sardar Angad Singh	Member	INC
4.	Shri Amit Vij	Member	INC
5.	Sardar Kanwar Sandhu	Member	INC
6.	Shri Madan Lal Jalalpur	Member	INC
7.	Sardar Navtej Singh Chemma	Member	INC
8.	Sardar Nirmal Singh	Member	INC
9.	Sardar Gurpartap Singh Wadala	Member	INC
10.	Shri Pawan Kumar Tinu	Member	INC
11.	Sardar Santokh Singh	Member	INC
12.	Sardar Sukhpal Singh Bhullar	Member	INC
13.	Sardar Sukhpal Singh Khaira	Member	

=== 2019–20 ===
Committee on Estimates (2019–20)
Sr. No.	Name	Post	Party
1.	Sardar Hardial Singh Kamboj	Chairperson	INC
2.	Sh. Arun Dogra	Member	INC
3.	Sardar Bikram Singh Majithia	Member	INC
4.	Sh. Dalvir Singh Khangura	Member	INC
5.	Dr. Dharambir Agnihotri	Member	INC
6.	Sardar Harinder Pal Singh Chandumajra	Member	INC
7.	Sardar Harjot Kamal Singh	Member	INC
8.	Sh. Jai Krishan Singh Rodi	Member	INC
9.	Sh. Joginder Pal	Member	INC
10.	Sh. Madan Lal Jalalpur	Member	INC
11.	Smt. Sarvjit Kaur Manuke	Member	INC
12.	Sh. Sunil Dutti	Member	INC
13.	Sh. Sushil Kumar Rinku	Member	

=== 2018–19 ===
Committee on Estimates (2018–19)
Sr. No.	Name	Post	Party
1.	Sardar Hardial Singh Kamboj	Chairperson	INC
2.	Sh. Arun Dogra	Member	INC
3.	Sardar Bikram Singh Majithia	Member	INC
4.	Dr. Dharambir Agnihotri	Member	INC
5.	Sardar Harminder Singh Gill	Member	INC
6.	Sh. Jai Krishan Singh	Member	INC
7.	Sh. Joginder Pal	Member	INC
8.	Sardar Lakhbir Singh Lodhinangal	Member	INC
9.	Sh. Madan Lal Jalalpur	Member	INC
10.	S. Pirmal Singh Dhaula	Member	INC
11.	Sardar Pritam Singh Kotbhai	Member	INC
12.	Sardar Sukhjit Singh	Member	INC
13.	Chaudhary Surinder Singh	Member	

=== 2017–18 ===
Committee on Estimates (2017–18)
Sr. No.	Name	Post	Party
1.	Sardar Sukhbinder Singh Sarkaria	Chairperson	INC
2.	Sh. Aman Arora	Member	INC
3.	Dr. Dharambir Agnihotri	Member	INC
4.	Sardar Hardial Singh Kamboj	Member	INC
5.	Sardar Harminder Singh Gill	Member	INC
6.	Sardar Harinderpal Singh Chandumajra	Member	INC
7.	Sardar Inderbeer Singh Bolaria	Member	INC
8.	Sardar Kushaldeep Singh Kiki Dhillon	Member	INC
9.	Sh. Pawan Kumar Adia	Member	INC
10.	Dr. Raj Kumar Chabewal	Member	INC
11.	Sardar Sharanjit Singh Dhillon	Member	INC
12.	Sardar Sukhpal Singh Khaira	Member	INC
13.	Sh. Vijay Inder Singla	Member	
