= Patiala Rural Assembly constituency =

Legislative Assembly constituency in Punjab State, India

Coordinates: 30.4°N 76.31°E

Patiala Rural
- Constituency No. 110 for the Punjab Legislative Assembly

Constituency details
- Country: India
- State: Punjab
- District: Patiala
- Lok Sabha constituency: Patiala
- Total electors: 226,041
- Reservation: None

Member of Legislative Assembly
- 16th Punjab Legislative Assembly
- Incumbent Dr. Balbir Singh
- Party: Aam Aadmi Party
- Elected year: 2022

Patiala Rural Assembly constituency is one of the 117 Legislative Assembly constituencies of Punjab state in India. It is part of Patiala district.

== Members of the Legislative Assembly ==
Most successful parties from Patiala Rural Vidhan Sabha
1. INC (2 Times) (66.7%)
2. AAP (1 Time) (33.3%)

Year	Member	Party
2012	Brahm Mohindra	Indian National Congress
2017	Brahm Mohindra	Indian National Congress
2022	Dr. Balbir Singh	Aam Aadmi Party

== Election results ==
=== 2027 ===
Punjab Assembly election, 2027: Patiala Rural
Party	Candidate	Votes	%	±%
AAP				
AD (WPD)				New entry
INC				
BSP				
SAD				
BJP				New entry
NOTA	None of the above			
Majority				
Turnout				

=== 2022 ===
Punjab Assembly election, 2022: Patiala Rural
Party	Candidate	Votes	%	±%
AAP	Dr. Balbir Singh	77,155	52.05	▲23.45
INC	Mohit Mohindra	23,681	15.97	▼31.33
SAD	Jaspal Singh Bitu Chatha	19,996	13.49	▼7.64
PLC	Sanjeev Sharma Bittu	11,887	8.02	New entry
SAD(A)	Mohinder Pal Singh	5,404	3.65	New entry
Independent	Saurabh Jain	3,080	2.08	New entry
Independent	Dhraminder Singh	1,071	0.72	New entry
NOTA	None of the above	771	0.52	
Majority		53,474	36.08	
Turnout		148,243	65.6	
Registered electors		226,033		
AAP gain from INC		Swing		

=== 2017 ===
Punjab Assembly election, 2017: Patiala Rural
Party	Candidate	Votes	%	±%
INC	Brahm Mohindra	68,891	47.30	▼1.22
AAP	Karanvir Singh Tiwana	41,662	28.60	New entry
SAD	Satbir Singh Khatra	30,784	21.13	▼5.82
NOTA	None of the above	1,009	0.69	
Majority		27,229	18.70	
Turnout		145,659	71.30	
Registered electors		225,639		
INC hold		Swing		

=== 2012 ===
Punjab Assembly election, 2017: Patiala Rural
Party	Candidate	Votes	%	±%
INC	Brahm Mohindra	62,077	48.52	New entry
SAD	Kuldeep Kaur Tohra	34,475	26.95	New entry
Independent	Satbir Singh Khatra	20,530	16.05	New entry
PPoP	Ved Chand	3,327	2.60	New entry
Majority		27,602	21.58	
Turnout		127,930	71.92	
Registered electors		177,869		
INC win (new seat)				

== See also ==
- List of constituencies of the Punjab Legislative Assembly
- Patiala district
