= Kashmir Singh Sohal =

Indian politician (1962/1963–2025)

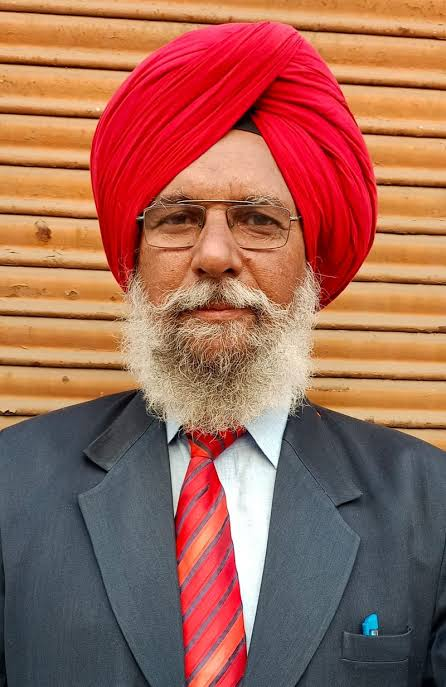
- Sohal in 2022

Member of the Punjab Legislative Assembly for Tarn Taran
- In office 2022 – 27 June 2025
- Preceded by: Dharambir Agnihotri
- Succeeded by: Harmeet Singh Sandhu

Personal details
- Born: 1962 or 1963
- Died: June 27, 2025 (aged 62) Amritsar, Punjab, India
- Party: Aam Aadmi Party
- Profession: Doctor

Kashmir Singh Sohal (1962 or 1963 – 27 June 2025) was an Indian politician and former MLA from Tarn Taran Assembly constituency. He was a member of the Aam Aadmi Party. Sohal was a doctor by profession.

== Member of Legislative Assembly ==
Sohal represented the Tarn Taran Assembly constituency as MLA in Punjab Assembly. The Aam Aadmi Party gained a strong 79% majority in the sixteenth Punjab Legislative Assembly by winning 92 out of 117 seats in the 2022 Punjab Legislative Assembly election. MP Bhagwant Mann was sworn in as Chief Minister on 16 March 2022. He remained active in the organisational activities of the PCMS Association during his more than 30 years of service as a medical officer in the Health Department, as he had also served as a doctor officer. He was the founder state President of the PCMS Specialists Doctors Association for more than 10 years.

Committee assignments of Punjab Legislative Assembly

- Member (2022–23) Committee on Estimates
- Member (2022–23) Committee on Privileges
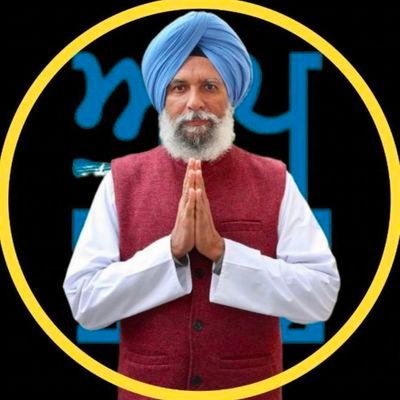
  election

== Death and tributes ==
Sohal died after a prolonged battle with oesophageal cancer in Amritsar, Punjab, on 27 June 2025, at the age of 62. He was survived by his wife, Navjot Kaur Hundal, a son and a daughter, both of whom are in the medical field.

Punjab Chief Minister Bhagwant Mann expressed grief over MLA's death. He said Sohal was a hardworking leader of AAP.

"Very sad to hear, Dr Saheb was a hardworking and struggling leader of the party. Heartfelt sympathies to his family in this sad time. May God grant peace to the departed soul and give patience and courage to the family and loved ones in this difficult time," wrote Mann on X.

== Electoral performance ==
2022 Punjab Legislative Assembly election: Tarn Taran
Party	Candidate	Votes	%	±%
AAP	Kashmir Singh Sohal	52,935	40.45	▲23.15
SAD	Harmeet Singh Sandhu	39,347	30.06	▼4.04
INC	Dharambir Agnihotri	26,535	20.28	▼24.82
SAD(A)	Amritpal Singh Mehron	6,363	4.86	▲4.06
Independent	Dr. Sukhmandeep Singh Dhillon	1,315	1.00	▲1.00
BJP	Navrat Singh Shafipura	1,176	0.90	New entry
NOTA	None of the above	1,168	0.6	
Majority		13,588	10.39	
Turnout		130,874	66.0	
Registered electors		198,439		
AAP gain from INC		Swing		

State Legislative Assembly
Preceded by Dharambir Agnihotri (INC)	Member of the Punjab Legislative Assembly from Tarn Taran Assembly constituency 2022–2025	Succeeded by Harmeet Singh Sandhu (AAP)
