= Amit Rattan =

Indian politician

MLA, Punjab Legislative Assembly
- Incumbent
- Assumed office 2022
- Constituency: Bathinda Rural
- Majority: Aam Aadmi Party

Personal details
- Party: Aam Aadmi Party

Amit Rattan is an Indian politician and the MLA representing the Bathinda Rural Assembly constituency in the Punjab Legislative Assembly. He is a member of the Aam Aadmi Party. He was elected as the MLA in the 2022 Punjab Legislative Assembly election.

== Member of Legislative Assembly ==
He represents the Bathinda Rural Assembly constituency as MLA in Punjab Assembly. The Aam Aadmi Party gained a strong 79% majority in the sixteenth Punjab Legislative Assembly by winning 92 out of 117 seats in the 2022 Punjab Legislative Assembly election. MP Bhagwant Mann was sworn in as Chief Minister on 16 March 2022.

Committee assignments of Punjab Legislative Assembly

- Member (2022–23) Committee on Privileges

== Electoral performance ==
Punjab Assembly election, 2022: Bathinda Rural
Party	Candidate	Votes	%	±%
AAP	Amit Rattan Kotfatta	66,096	53.70	
SAD	Parkash Singh Bhatti	30,617	24.9	
INC	Harvinder Singh Gill ‘Laddi’	22,716	18.5	
NOTA	None of the above	1,250	0.8	
Majority		35,479	28.5	
Turnout		124,402	78.2	
Registered electors		158,866		

State Legislative Assembly
Preceded by -	Member of the Punjab Legislative Assembly from Bathinda Rural Assembly constituency 2022 –	Incumbent
