= Bathinda Rural Assembly constituency =

Legislative Assembly constituency in Punjab State, India

Coordinates: 30.19°N 74.83°E

Bathinda Rural
- Constituency No. 93 for the Punjab Legislative Assembly

Constituency details
- Country: India
- State: Punjab
- District: Bathinda
- Lok Sabha constituency: Bathinda
- Total electors: 158,082 (in 2022)
- Reservation: SC

Member of Legislative Assembly
- 16th Punjab Legislative Assembly
- Incumbent Amit Rattan Kotfatta
- Party: Aam Aadmi Party
- Elected year: 2022

Bathinda Rural is a Punjab Legislative Assembly constituency in Bathinda district, Punjab state, India. It is redistricted from Pakka Kalan Assembly constituency.

== Members of the Legislative Assembly ==
Most successful parties from Bathinda Rural Vidhan Sabha
1. AAP (2 Times) (66.7%)
2. SAD (1 Time) (33.3%)

Year	Member	Party
Created from Pakka Kalan
2012	Darshan Singh Kotfatta	Shiromani Akali Dal
2017	Rupinder Kaur Ruby	Aam Aadmi Party
2022	Amit Rattan Kotfatta	Aam Aadmi Party

== Election results ==
=== 2027 ===
Punjab Assembly election, 2027: Bathinda Rural
Party	Candidate	Votes	%	±%
AAP				
AD (WPD)				New entry
INC				
BSP				
SAD				
BJP				New entry
NOTA	None of the above			
Majority				
Turnout				

=== 2022 ===
Punjab Assembly election, 2022: Bathinda Rural
Party	Candidate	Votes	%	±%
AAP	Amit Rattan Kotfatta	66,096	53.70	▲12.72
SAD	Parkash Singh Bhatti	30,617	24.90	▼7.51
INC	Harvinder Singh Gill ‘Laddi’	22,716	18.50	▼4.49
PLC	Savera Singh	592	0.48	
NOTA	None of the above	1,250	0.80	
Majority		35,479	28.50	
Turnout		124,402	78.20	
Registered electors		158,866		
AAP hold		Swing		

=== 2017 ===
Punjab Assembly election, 2017: Bathinda Rural
Party	Candidate	Votes	%	±%
AAP	Rupinder Kaur Ruby	51,572	40.98	New entry
SAD	Amit Rattan Kotfatta	40,794	32.41	▼9.16
INC	Harvinder Singh	28,939	22.99	▼13.75
NOTA	None of the above	1,216	0.97	
Majority		10,778	8.48	
Turnout		127,077	81.93	
Registered electors		155,113		
AAP gain from SAD		Swing		

=== 2012 ===
Punjab Assembly election, 2012: Bathinda Rural
Party	Candidate	Votes	%	±%
SAD	Darshan Singh Kotfatta	45,705	41.57	New entry
INC	Makhan Singh	40,397	36.74	New entry
CPI	Surjeet Singh Sohi	17,655	16.06	New entry
LJP	Kiranjit Singh Gehri	2,348	2.14	New entry
BSP	Harbans Singh	1,799	1.64	New entry
Majority		5,308	4.83	
Turnout		109,945	79.59	
Registered electors		138,147		
SAD win (new seat)				
