= Baljinder Kaur (politician) =

Indian politician (born 1986)

Balj Kaur

Member of Punjab Legislative Assembly
- Incumbent
- Assumed office 2017
- Preceded by: Jeetmohinder Singh Sidhu
- Constituency: Talwandi Sabo

Personal details
- Born: 14 September 1986 (age 39) Jaga Ram Tirath Talwandi Sabo, Punjab
- Party: Aam Aadmi Party
- Spouse: Sukhraj Singh
- Parent(s): Darshan Singh and Ranjit Kaur

Baljinder Kaur is an Indian politician and member of the Punjab Legislative Assembly (MLA) representing Talwandi Sabo Assembly constituency. She is a member of the Aam Aadmi Party.

== Personal life ==
Kaur did her M. Phil. from Punjabi University, Patiala in 2009. Before entering politics she was a professor of English at Mata Gujri College at Fatehgarh Sahib. She married Sukhraj Singh in February 2019; he is also a politician from Aam Aadmi Party. She has one daughter.

== Political career ==
In 2011 Kaur joined the Indian anti-corruption movement and in 2012 joined Aam Aadmi Party. The first time she contested bypoll election from Talwandi Sabo Assembly constituency in 2014 but lost the election.

== Member of Legislative Assembly ==
=== First term (2017-2022) ===
She was elected as the Member of Legislative Assembly in the 2017 election she defeated Jeetmohinder Singh of Shiromani Akali Dal with a margin of 19,293 votes.

In the 2019 Indian general election in Punjab she was declared the candidate from Bathinda Lok Sabha constituency by the party. However she lost the election and stood at third place.

She was the president of the women's wing of AAP Punjab.

Committee assignments of 15th Punjab Legislative Assembly

- Member (2020–21) Committee on Government Assurances
- Member Library Committee
- Member Committee on Subordinate Legislation

=== Second term (2022-present) ===
The Aam Aadmi Party gained a strong 79% majority in the sixteenth Punjab Legislative Assembly by winning 92 out of 117 seats in the 2022 Punjab Legislative Assembly election. MP Bhagwant Mann was sworn in as Chief Minister on 16 March 2022.

Committee assignments of 16th Punjab Legislative Assembly

- Chairperson (2022–23) Committee on Questions & References

== Electoral performance for Punjab Assembly ==
2017 Punjab Legislative Assembly election: Talwandi Sabo
Party	Candidate	Votes	%	±%
AAP	Prof. Baljinder Kaur	54,553	42.67	
INC	Khushbaz Singh Jatana	35,260	27.58	
SAD	Jeetmohinder Singh Sidhu	34,473	26.96	
BSP	Harjinder Singh Mithan	1,346	1.05	
IND	Karamjit Singh	660	0.52	
SAD(A)	Avtar Singh Chopra	596	0.47	
NOTA	None of the above	578	0.45	
IND	Baljinder Singh	355	0.28	
IND	Darshan Singh	338	0.26	
APP	Varinder Singh Dhillon	267	0.21	
Majority		19,293	15.09	
Turnout		128,426	85.99	
AAP gain from INC		Swing		

Assembly election, 2022: Talwandi Sabo
Party	Candidate	Votes	%	±%
AAP	Baljinder Kaur	48,753	37.30	
SAD	Jeet mohinder Singh Sidhu	33,501	25.7	
INC	Khushbaz Singh Jatana	26,628	20.4	
Independent	Harminder Singh Jassi	12,623	9.7	
BJP	Ravi Preet Singh Sidhu	4,369	3.4	New entry
NOTA	None of the above	1,008	0.6	
Majority		15,252	11.58	
Turnout		131,606	83.7	
Registered electors		157,174		
AAP hold				

State Legislative Assembly
Preceded by Jeetmohinder Singh Sidhu	Member of the Punjab Legislative Assembly from Talwandi Sabo Assembly constituency 2017 –	Incumbent
Aam Aadmi Party political offices
Preceded by -	Member of National Executive Committee; Aam Aadmi Party – present	Incumbent
