= Sukhwinder Kumar =

Indian politician from Punjab

Dr. Sukhwinder Kumar Sukhi

Punjab Legislative Assembly
- Incumbent
- Assumed office 12 March 2017
- Preceded by: Tarlochan Singh
- Constituency: Banga Assembly constituency

Personal details
- Born: 06/12/1960 Village Gunachaur
- Party: Aam Admi Party (August 2024 - Present)
- Other political affiliations: Shiromani Akali Dal (till 2024)
- Spouse: Dr Anju
- Profession: Politician

Sukhwinder Kumar is an Indian politician and a member of Aam Aadmi Party, before he was a member of Shiromani Akali Dal. In 2017 and 2022, he was elected as the member of the Punjab Legislative Assembly from Banga Assembly constituency. In 2023, he had contested Jalandhar by-election from SAD and BSP coalition ticket but lost to Sushil Kumar Rinku of Aam Aadmi Party.

== Constituency ==
Kumar represents the Banga Assembly constituency. Kumar won the Banga Assembly constituency on a Shiromani Akali Dal ticket. Kumar beat the member of the Punjab Legislative Assembly, Harjot of the Aam Aadmi Party by over 1893 votes. He joined Aam Aadmi Party in 2024.
