= Dharambir Agnihotri =

Indian politician

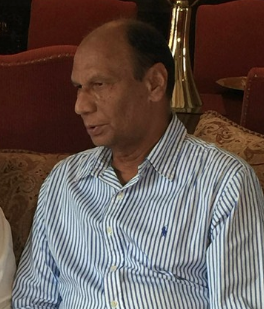

MLA, Punjab
- In office 2017- 2022
- Preceded by: Harmeet Singh Sandhu
- Succeeded by: Kashmir Singh Sohal
- Constituency: Tarn Taran
- Majority: 14629

Sarpanch
- In office 1997 - 2002
- Constituency: Village Sheron, Tarn Taran

Personal details
- Born: 13 March 1946 Village Sheron, Tarn Taran
- Died: 27 August 2022 (aged 76)
- Party: Indian National Congress
- Spouse: Smt. Kiran Agnihotri
- Children: Two Sons & One Daughter
- Education: Tibbia College
- Occupation: Doctor, Politician
- Website: Twitter

Dharambir Agnihotri (13 March 1946 – 27 August 2022) was a member of the Indian National Congress party. He was the member of Punjab Legislative Assembly (MLA) from Tarn Taran Assembly Constituency between 2017 and 2022. He was a doctor by training and worked at his hospital named Agnihotri Hospital in village Sheron Tarn Taran.

Agnihotri was elected to the Punjab Vidhan Sabha for the first time in 2017. Remained General Secretary Punjab Pradesh Congress Committee, Chandigarh and President District Congress Committee Tarn Taran. He also held the office as Member of the Estimate Committee of Punjab Vidhan Sabha (2017–18) and member of Committee on Estimates of Punjab Vidhan Sabha (2018–19). He was member of recently formed Cooperation Department. He was also member of Privilege committee and Local Body Committee in Government of Punjab.

== Political career ==
Dharambir Agnihotri first became a sarpanch (head of a village) of Sheron (where his hospital is) and he was unanimously elected in 1997.

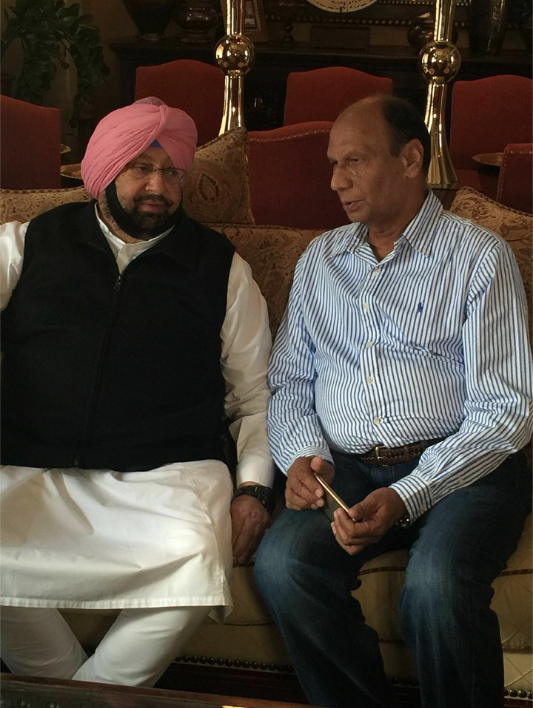
Dharambir Agnihotri talking to Amarinder Singh in 2016.

Agnihotri was recruited by Captain Amarinder Singh of Indian National Congress himself in 2007 to run as a candidate for the legislative assembly from Naushara Pannuan, but he lost by a margin of 2459 votes against Ranjit Singh Brahampura of Shiromani Akali Dal. In 2012 Dharambir switched constituencies and this time fought the election from the Taran Tarn constituency, again he lost this time by a margin of 4621 votes to Harmeet Singh Sandhu of Shiromani Akali Dal. In 2010, he was made President of the District Congress Committee for Tarn Taran until he resigned in 2013. In 2014 he was made the general secretary of the Punjab Pradesh Congress Committee.

=== Member of Legislative Assembly ===
He was the member of Punjab Legislative Assembly (MLA) from Tarn Taran Assembly Constituency between 2017 and 2022. He won by a record margin by defeating 3 time MLA Harmeet Singh Sandhu (Once independent and twice from Shiromani Akali Dal).

In 2017, Agnihotri again ran from Taran Tarn and defeated the incumbent Harmeet Singh Sandhu of Shiromani Akali Dal by a margin of 14,629 votes. This was the first time that a candidate from the Congress party won from Tarn Taran constituency in around 40 years. Dharambir was the first Hindu candidate to win an election from Tarn Taran constituency.

Agnihotri participated in the agitation against Union Government led by Narendra Modi against newly passed 3 Farms Laws along with other Congress MLAs and MPs at Jantar Mantar New Delhi.

In the 2022 Punjab Legislative Assembly election Agnihotri was defeated by Kashmir Singh Sohal from the Aam Admi Party.

=== Committee assignments ===
- Privilege Committee : (2021 - 2022)
- Local Body Committee : (2021 - 2022)
- Cooperation Department: (2021 - 2022)
- Guru Nanak Dev University, Amritsar - Member Syndicate
- Punjab Pradesh Congress Committee- Secretary Punjab.
- Formerly, President, District Congress Committee, Tarn-Taran

== Sources ==
- bio from Yes Punjab
- Punjab data entry on Agnihotri

State Legislative Assembly
| Preceded by Harmeet Singh Sandhu | Member of the Punjab Legislative Assembly from Tarn Taran Assembly constituency 2017 – 2022 | Succeeded by Kashmir Singh Sohal |
