= Harmeet Singh Sandhu =

Indian politician

Member of Punjab Legislative Assembly
- Incumbent
- Assumed office 14 November 2025
- Preceded by: Kashmir Singh Sohal
- Constituency: Tarn Taran
- In office 2002–2017
- Preceded by: Prem Singh Lalpur
- Succeeded by: Dharambir Agnihotri
- Constituency: Tarn Taran

Personal details
- Born: 14 December 1969 (age 56) Amritsar, Punjab, India
- Party: Aam Aadmi Party
- Other political affiliations: Shiromani Akali Dal
- Spouse: Kawaljit Kaur
- Education: Guru Nanak Dev University

Harmeet Singh Sandhu is an Indian politician. He belongs to the Aam Aadmi Party. He is a member of the Punjab Legislative Assembly and represents Tarn Taran since 2025 and previously from 2002 to 2017.

== Political career ==
Sandhu was elected to the Punjab Legislative Assembly from Tarn Taran in 2002 as an independent candidate. In 2007, he successfully contested as Akali Dal candidate from Tarn Taran. In June 2011, he was appointed the Chief Parliamentary Secretary. He was re-elected to the Punjab Assembly in 2012.

Harmeet Singh Sandhu joined Aam Aadmi Party in July 2025. He contested Tarn Taran bye election which was necessitated following the death of sitting MLA Kashmir Singh Sohal in June 2025. He contested from AAP and defeated his nearest rival Shiromani Akali Dal Sukhwinder Kaur Randhawa with a majority of 12,091 votes.

State Legislative Assembly
Preceded by Kashmir Singh Sohal (AAP)	Member of the Punjab Legislative Assembly from Tarn Taran Assembly constituency 2025 – present	Incumbent

State Legislative Assembly
Preceded by Prem Singh Lalpur	Member of the Punjab Legislative Assembly from Tarn Taran Assembly constituency 2002 – 2017	Succeeded by Dharambir Agnihotri (INC)
