= 15th Punjab Assembly =

Members of Punjab Legislative Assembly

15th Punjab Legislative Assembly

Type
- Type: Unicameral
- Houses: Punjab Legislative Assembly

History
- Founded: 12 March 2017
- Disbanded: 11 March 2022
- Preceded by: 14th Punjab Assembly
- Succeeded by: 16th Punjab Assembly

Leadership
- Speaker: Rana Kanwar Pal Singh
- Deputy Speaker: Ajaib Singh Bhatti
- Leader of the House: Amarinder Singh (2017-2021)
- Chief Minister: Amarinder Singh (2017-2021); Charanjit Singh Channi (2021-2022) since Leader of the opposition
- Leader of the Opposition: H. S. Phoolka (2017); Sukhpal Singh Khaira (2017-2018); Harpal Singh Cheema (2018-2022)

Structure
- Seats: 117
- Political groups: Government (77): INC (77); Opposition (40): AAP (20); SAD (15); BJP (3); LIP (2)
- Length of term: 2017-2022

Elections
- Voting system: First-past-the-post
- Last election: 4 February 2017
- Next election: 20 February 2022

2017 Punjab Legislative Assembly election for the constitution of the 15th Legislative Assembly was held in the Indian state of Punjab on 4 February 2017 to elect the 117 members of the Punjab Legislative Assembly. The counting of votes was done on 11 March 2017.

The term of the 15th Punjab assembly ended with its dissolution on 11 March 2022. The dissolution was necessitated after the results of the election was declared on 10 March.

== Office bearers ==
| Office | Holder | Portrait | Since |
Constitutional Posts
| Governor | Banwarilal Purohit | | 31 August 2021 |
| Speaker | Rana Kanwal Pal Singh | | 27 March 2017 |
| Deputy speaker | Ajaib Singh Bhatti | | 16 June 2017 |
| Leader of the House (Chief Minister) | Amarinder Singh | | 2017-2021 |
| Leader of the House (Chief Minister) | Charanjit Singh Channi | | 20 September 2021 |
Political posts
| Leader of INC legislature party | Amarinder Singh | | 2017-2021 |
| Leader of INC legislature party | Charanjit Singh Channi | | 20 September 2021 |
| Leader of Opposition (Leader of AAP legislature party) | H. S. Phoolka | | |
| Leader of Opposition (Leader of AAP legislature party) | Sukhpal Singh Khaira | | |
| Leader of Opposition (Leader of AAP legislature party) | Harpal Singh Cheema | | 28 July 2018 |

== Committees ==
=== 2021-2022 ===
The list of chairmen from May 2021 to March 2022.

| Committee | Chairperson | Party |
|---|---|---|
| Committee on Public Accounts | Gurmeet Singh Meet Hayer | Aam Aadmi Party |
| Committee on Estimates | Hardyal Singh Kamboj | Indian National Congress |
| Committee on Public Undertakings | Navtej Singh Cheema | Indian National Congress |
| Committee on Welfare of Scheduled Castes, Scheduled Tribes and Backward Classes | Nathu Ram | Indian National Congress |
| Committee on Privileges | Kushaldeep Singh Dhillon | Indian National Congress |
| Committee on Government Assurances | Inderbir Singh Bolaria | Indian National Congress |
| Committee on Local Bodies | Sunil Dutti | Indian National Congress |
| Panchayati Raj Institutions | Harpartap Singh | Indian National Congress |
| Committee on Subordinate Legislation | Tarsem Singh D.C | Indian National Congress |
| Committee on Papers Laid/to be Laid on the Table and Library | Lakhbir Singh Lodhinangal | Shiromani Akali Dal |
| Committee on Petitions | Gurkirat Singh Kotli | Indian National Congress |
| House Committee | Ajaib Singh Bhatti (Ex-offico Chairperson) | Indian National Congress |
| Committee on Questions & References | Parminder Singh Pinki | Indian National Congress |
| Committee on Co-operation and its allied activities | Fatehjang Singh Bajwa | Indian National Congress |
| Committee on Agriculture and its allied activities | Ramanjit Singh Sikki | Indian National Congress |

== Members of Punjab Legislative Assembly ==
Members of the Punjab Legislative Assembly elected in 2017. List updated as of 3 June 2019

| AC No. | Constituency | Name of the Winning Candidate | Political Party |
|---|---|---|---|
| 1 | Sujanpur | Dinesh Singh | BJP |
| 2 | Bhoa | Joginder Pal | INC |
| 3 | Pathankot | Amit Vij | INC |
| 4 | Gurdaspur | Barindermeet Singh Pahra | INC |
| 5 | Dina Nagar | Aruna Chaudhary | INC |
| 6 | Qadian | Fatehjang Singh Bajwa | INC |
| 7 | Batala | Lakhbir Singh Lodhinangal | SAD |
| 8 | Sri Hargobindpur | Balwinder Singh | INC |
| 9 | Fatehgarh Churian | Tript Rajinder Singh Bajwa | INC |
| 10 | Dera Baba Nanak | Sukhjinder Singh Randhawa | INC |
| 11 | Ajnala | Harpartap Singh | INC |
| 12 | Raja Sansi | Sukhbinder Singh Sarkaria | INC |
| 13 | Majitha | Bikram Singh Majithia | SAD |
| 14 | Jandiala | Sukhwinder Singh Danny Bandala | INC |
| 15 | Amritsar North | Sunil Dutti | INC |
| 16 | Amritsar West | Raj Kumar Verka | INC |
| 17 | Amritsar Central | Om Parkash Soni | INC |
| 18 | Amritsar East | Navjot Singh Sidhu | INC |
| 19 | Amritsar South | Inderbir Singh Bolaria | INC |
| 20 | Attari | Tarsem Singh D.C. | INC |
| 21 | Tarn Taran | Dr. Dharambir Agnihotri | INC |
| 22 | Khem Karan | Sukhpal Singh Bhullar | INC |
| 23 | Patti | Harminder Singh Gill | INC |
| 24 | Khadoor Sahib | Ramanjeet Singh Sahota Sikki | INC |
| 25 | Baba Bakala | Santokh Singh | INC |
| 26 | Bholath | Sukhpal Singh Khaira (resigned on 25 April 2019) | AAP |
| 27 | Kapurthala | Rana Gurjit Singh | INC |
| 28 | Sultanpur Lodhi | Navtej Singh Cheema | INC |
| 29 | Phagwara | Som Parkash (resigned on 03.06.2019) | BJP |
| 30 | Phillaur | Baldev Singh Khaira | SAD |
| 31 | Nakodar | Gurpratap Singh Wadala | SAD |
| 32 | Shahkot | Ajit Singh Kohar (died on 4 Feb. 2018) | SAD |
| 32 | Sahkot (bypoll in May 2018) | Hardev Singh Ladi | INC |
| 33 | Kartarpur | Chaudhary Surinder Singh | INC |
| 34 | Jalandhar West | Sushil Kumar Rinku | INC |
| 35 | Jalandhar Central | Rajinder Beri | INC |
| 36 | Jalandhar North | Avtar Singh Junior | INC |
| 37 | Jalandhar Cantt. | Pargat Singh Powar | INC |
| 38 | Adampur | Pawan Kumar Tinu | SAD |
| 39 | Mukerian | Rajnish Kumar Babbi | INC |
| 40 | Dasuya | Arun Dogra | INC |
| 41 | Urmar | Sangat Singh Gilzian | INC |
| 42 | Sham Chaurasi | Pawan Kumar Adia | INC |
| 43 | Hoshiarpur | Sunder Sham Arora | INC |
| 44 | Chabbewal | Dr. Raj Kumar | INC |
| 45 | Garhshankar | Jai Krishan | AAP |
| 46 | Banga (SC) | Sukhwinder Kumar | SAD |
| 47 | Nawanshahr | Angad Singh | INC |
| 48 | Balachaur | Darshan Lal | INC |
| 49 | Anandpur Sahib | Kanwar Pal Singh | INC |
| 50 | Rupnagar | Amarjit Singh Sandoa (resigned on 5 May 2019) | AAP |
| 51 | Chamkaur Sahib | Charanjit Singh Channi | INC |
| 52 | Kharar | Kanwar Sandhu | AAP |
| 53 | S.A.S. Nagar | Balbir Singh Sidhu | INC |
| 54 | Bassi Pathana | Gurpreet Singh | INC |
| 55 | Fatehgarh Sahib | Kuljit Singh Nagra | INC |
| 56 | Amloh | Randeep Singh | INC |
| 57 | Khanna | Gurkirat Singh Kotli | INC |
| 58 | Samrala | Amrik Singh Dhillon | INC |
| 59 | Sahnewal | Sharanjit Singh Dhillon | SAD |
| 60 | Ludhiana East | Sanjeev Talwar | INC |
| 61 | Ludhiana South | Balvinder Singh Bains | LIP |
| 62 | Atam Nagar | Simarjeet Singh Bains | LIP |
| 63 | Ludhiana Central | Surinder Kumar Dawar | INC |
| 64 | Ludhiana West | Bharat Bhushan Ashu | INC |
| 65 | Ludhiana North | Rakesh Pandey | INC |
| 66 | Gill | Kuldeep Singh Vaid | INC |
| 67 | Payal | Lakhvir Singh Lakha | INC |
| 68 | Dakha | Harvinder Singh Phoolka (resigned on 12 oct. 2018) | AAP |
| 69 | Raikot | Jagtar Singh Jagga Hissowal | AAP |
| 70 | Jagraon | Saravjit Kaur Manuke | AAP |
| 71 | Nihal Singhwala | Manjit Singh | AAP |
| 72 | Bhagha Purana | Darshan Singh Brar | INC |
| 73 | Moga | Harjot Kamal Singh | INC |
| 74 | Dharamkot | Sukhjit Singh | INC |
| 75 | Zira | Kulbir Singh | INC |
| 76 | Firozpur City | Parminder Singh Pinki | INC |
| 77 | Firozpur Rural | Satkar Kaur | INC |
| 78 | Guru Har Sahai | Gurmeet Singh Sodhi | INC |
| 79 | Jalalabad | Sukhbir Singh Badal (resigned on 31 May 2019) | SAD |
| 80 | Fazilka | Davinder Singh Ghubaya | INC |
| 81 | Abohar | Arun Narang | BJP |
| 82 | Balluana | Nathu Ram | INC |
| 83 | Lambi | Parkash Singh | SAD |
| 84 | Gidderbaha | Amrinder Singh alias Raja Warring | INC |
| 85 | Malout | Ajaib Singh Bhatti | INC |
| 86 | Muktsar | Kanwarjit Singh | SAD |
| 87 | Faridkot | Kushaldeep Singh Dhillon | INC |
| 88 | Kotkapura | Kultar Singh Sandhwan | AAP |
| 89 | Jaito | Baldev Singh | AAP |
| 90 | Rampura Phul | Gurpreet Singh Kangar | INC |
| 91 | Bhucho Mandi | Pritam Singh Kotbhai | INC |
| 92 | Bathinda Urban | Manpreet Singh Badal | INC |
| 93 | Bathinda Rural | Rupinder Kaur Ruby | AAP |
| 94 | Talwandi Sabo | Prof. Baljinder Kaur | AAP |
| 95 | Maur | Jagdev Singh Kamalu | AAP |
| 96 | Mansa | Nazar Singh Manshahia (resigned on 25 April 2019) | AAP |
| 97 | Sardulgarh | Dilraj Singh | SAD |
| 98 | Budhlada | Prof. Budh Ram | AAP |
| 99 | Lehra | Parminder Singh Dhindsa | SAD |
| 100 | Dirba | Harpal Singh Cheema | AAP |
| 101 | Sunam | Aman Arora | AAP |
| 102 | Bhadaur | Pirmal Singh Dhaula | AAP |
| 103 | Barnala | Gurmeet Singh Meet Hayer | AAP |
| 104 | Mehal Kalan | Kulwant Singh Pandori | AAP |
| 105 | Malerkotla | Razia Sultana | INC |
| 106 | Amargarh | Surjit Singh Dhiman | INC |
| 107 | Dhuri | Dalvir Singh Goldy | INC |
| 108 | Sangrur | Vijay Inder Singla | INC |
| 109 | Nabha | Sadhu Singh | INC |
| 110 | Patiala Rural | Brahm Mohindra | INC |
| 111 | Rajpura | Hardial Singh Kamboj | INC |
| 112 | Dera Bassi | Narinder Kumar Sharma | SAD |
| 113 | Ghanaur | Thekedar Madan Lal Jalalpur | INC |
| 114 | Sanour | Harinder Pal Singh Chandumajra | SAD |
| 115 | Patiala | Amarinder Singh | INC |
| 116 | Samana | Rajinder Singh | INC |
| 117 | Shutrana | Nirmal Singh | INC |

== By-Elections ==
2018 bypolls in Punjab

| S.No | Constituency | MLA before election | Party before election | Date | Elected MLA | Party after election |
|---|---|---|---|---|---|---|
| 1 | Shahkot | Ajit Singh Kohar | Shiromani Akali Dal | 28 May 2018 | Hardev Singh Ladi | Indian National Congress |

2019 Bypolls in Punjab

| S.No | Constituency | MLA before election | Party before election | Date | Elected MLA | Party after election |
|---|---|---|---|---|---|---|
| 1 | Phagwara | Som Parkash | Bharatiya Janata Party | 21 October 2019 | Balwinder Singh Dhaliwal | Indian National Congress |
| 2 | Mukerian | Rajnish Kumar Babbi | Indian National Congress | 21 October 2019 | Indu Bala | Indian National Congress |
| 3 | Jalalabad | Sukhbir Singh Badal | Shiromani Akali Dal | 21 October 2019 | Raminder Singh Awla | Indian National Congress |
| 4 | Dakha | Harvinder Singh Phoolka | Aam Aadmi Party | 21 October 2019 | Manpreet Singh Ayali | Shiromani Akali Dal |
