= List of speakers of the Punjab Legislative Assembly =

Speakers and Dy. Speakers list

Speaker of the Punjab Legislative Assembly
- Punjab Legislative Assembly seal

- Incumbent; Kultar Singh Sandhwan since 21 March 2022
- Appointer: Members of the Punjab Legislative Assembly
- Term length: Five years; no renewable limit
- Inaugural holder: Shahab-ud-Din Virk
- Formation: 6 April 1937; 89 years ago
- Deputy: Jai Krishan Singh
- Website: Speaker of Punjab assembly; Deputy Speaker of Punjab assembly

In the Republic of India, the various central and state legislatures are presided by either a Speaker or a Chairman. The Speaker is elected in the very first meeting of the Punjab Legislative Assembly after the General elections for a term of 5 years from amongst the members of the Vidhan Sabha. The Speaker holds office until either he ceases to be a member of the Vidhan Sabha or he himself resigns. The Speaker can be removed from office by a resolution passed in the Vidhan Sabha by an effective majority of its members. In the absence of a Speaker, the meeting of Punjab Legislative Assembly is presided over by the Deputy Speaker. The incumbent Speaker is Kultar Singh Sandhwan and the deputy speaker is Jai Krishan Singh of Aam Admi Party.

== Powers and functions of the Speaker ==
Following are the functions and position of Speakers.

- The Speaker of the Vidhan Sabha conducts the business in house, and decides whether a bill is a money bill or not.
- They maintain discipline and decorum in the house and can punish a member for their unruly behaviour by suspending them.
- They also permit the moving of various kinds of motions and resolutions such as a motion of no confidence, motion of adjournment, motion of censure and calling attention notice as per the rules.
- The speaker decides on the agenda to be taken up for discussion during the meeting.
- The date of election of the speaker is fixed by the Governor of Punjab. Further, all comments and speeches made by members of the House are addressed to the speaker.
- The speaker is answerable to the house.
- Both the speaker and deputy speaker may be removed by a resolution passed by the majority of the members.
- Speaker also gives recognition to the main opposite party as an Official Opposition and to the leader of that party in assembly as the Leader of Opposition.

== Speaker ==
S. No.	Name	Constituency	Tenure		Duration	Party	Assembly
Pre-Independence (1937-1947)
1	Shahab-ud-Din Virk	Sialkot	6 April 1937	16 March 1945	7 years, 344 days	Unionist Party	1st
2	Satya Prakash Singha	West Central Punjab	21 March 1946	4 July 1947	1 year, 105 days	Unionist Party	2nd
After Independence (1947–present)
1	Kapur Singh	Ludhiana East	1 November 1947	20 June 1951	3 years, 231 days	Indian National Congress	-
2	Satya Pal	Amritsar City North	5 May 1952	18 April 1954	1 year, 348 days	Indian National Congress	1st
3	Gurdial Singh Dhillon	Tarn Taran	18 May 1954	25 April 1957	2 years, 342 days	Indian National Congress	1st
3	Gurdial Singh Dhillon	Tarn Taran	25 April 1957	13 March 1962	4 years, 322 days	Indian National Congress	2nd
4	Prabodh Chandra	Gurdaspur	14 March 1962	18 March 1964	2 years, 4 days	Indian National Congress	3rd
5	Harbans Lal Gupta	Bathinda	25 March 1964	19 March 1967	2 years, 359 days	Indian National Congress	3rd
6	Joginder Singh Mann	Sirhind	21 March 1967	13 March 1969	1 year, 357 days	Akali Dal - Tara Singh	4th
7	Darbara Singh	Nakodar	14 March 1969	13 June 1971	2 years, 91 days	Independent	5th
7	Darbara Singh	Nakodar	22 March 1972	3 September 1973	1 year, 165 days	Indian National Congress	6th
8	Kewal Krishan	Mukerian	25 September 1973	30 June 1977	3 years, 278 days	Indian National Congress	6th
9	Ravi Inder Singh	Morinda	1 July 1977	27 June 1980	2 years, 362 days	Shiromani Akali Dal	7th
10	Brij Bhushan Mehra	Amritsar North	1 July 1980	13 October 1985	5 years, 104 days	Indian National Congress (Indira)	8th
(9)	Ravi Inder Singh	Morinda	15 October 1985	27 May 1986	224 days	Shiromani Akali Dal	9th
11	Surjit Singh Minhas	Adampur	2 June 1986	15 March 1992	5 years, 287 days	Shiromani Akali Dal	9th
12	Harcharan Singh Ajnala	Ajnala	17 March 1992	9 June 1993	1 year, 84 days	Indian National Congress (Indira)	10th
13	Harnam Das Johar	Ludhiana West	21 July 1993	23 November 1996	3 years, 125 days	Indian National Congress (Indira)	10th
14	Dilbagh Singh Daleke	Tarn Taran	23 December 1996	2 March 1997	69 days	Indian National Congress (Indira)	10th
15	Charanjit Singh Atwal	Kum Kalan	4 March 1997	20 March 2002	5 years, 16 days	Shiromani Akali Dal	11th
(8)	Kewal Krishan	Mukerian	21 March 2002	15 March 2007	4 years, 359 days	Indian National Congress	12th
16	Nirmal Singh Kahlon	Fatehgarh Churian	16 March 2007	19 March 2012	5 years, 3 days	Shiromani Akali Dal	13th
(15)	Charanjit Singh Atwal	Payal	20 March 2012	27 March 2017	5 years, 7 days	Shiromani Akali Dal	14th
17	Rana KP Singh	Anandpur Sahib	27 March 2017	11 March 2022	4 years, 349 days	Indian National Congress	15th
18	Kultar Singh Sandhwan	Kotkapura	21 March 2022	Incumbent	4 years, 207 days	Aam Aadmi Party	16th

== Deputy Speaker ==
The Deputy Speaker is the vice-presiding officer of the Vidhan Sabha. Acts as the presiding officer in case of leave or absence caused by death or illness of the Speaker.

=== List of Deputy Speakers ===
Color keys for the Party of Deputy Speaker

- Akali Dal - Sant Fateh Singh
- Bharatiya Janata Party
- Bharatiya Jana Sangh
- Indian National Congress
- Janata Party
- Shiromani Akali Dal
- Unionist Party

S. No.	Name	Constituency	Tenure		Duration	Party
	Pre-Independence (1937-1947)					
1.	Dasaundha Singh	Jagraon	6 April 1937	7 April 1941	4 years, 1 day	Unionist Party
2.	Gurbachan Singh	Jullundur West	22 April 1941	16 March 1945	3 years, 328 days	Unionist Party
3.	Kapur Singh	Ludhiana East	26 March 1946	4 July 1947	1 year, 100 days	Unionist Party
	After Independence (1947–1966)					
1.	Thakur Panchan Chand	Kangra North	3 November 1947	20 March 1951	3 years, 137 days	Indian National Congress
2.	Shanno Devi	Amritsar City West	26 March 1951	20 June 1951	86 days	Indian National Congress
3.	Gurdial Singh Dhillon	Jhabal	10 May 1952	17 May 1954	2 years, 7 days	Indian National Congress
4.	Sarup Singh	Narnaund	19 May 1954	31 March 1957	2 years, 316 days	Indian National Congress
(4)	Sarup Singh	Hansi	25 April 1957	28 February 1962	4 years, 309 days	Indian National Congress
5.	Shanno Devi	Jagadhri	19 March 1962	31 October 1966	4 years, 226 days	Indian National Congress
Post- Reorganisation (1966 - Present)
6.	Jagjit Singh Chohan	Tanda	27 March 1967	27 November 1967	245 days	Akali Dal - Sant Fateh Singh
7.	Baldev Singh		8 December 1967	23 August 1968	259 days	Akali Dal - Sant Fateh Singh
8.	Bikramajit Singh Bajwa	Batala	20 March 1969	24 April 1970	1 year, 35 days	Bharatiya Jana Sangh
(8)	Bikramajit Singh Bajwa	Batala	28 July 1970	13 October 1971	1 year, 77 days	Bharatiya Jana Sangh
9.	Kewal Krishan	Mukerian	28 March 1972	25 September 1973	1 year, 181 days	Indian National Congress
10.	Nasib Singh Gill	Zira	28 September 1973	30 April 1977	3 years, 214 days	Indian National Congress
11.	Panna Lal Nayyar	Batala	8 July 1977	17 February 1980	2 years, 224 days	Janata Party
12.	Guizar Singh	Nathana	8 July 1980	26 June 1985	4 years, 353 days	Indian National Congress (Indira)
13.	Nirmal Singh Kahlon	Fatehgarh Churian	5 November 1985	6 May 1986	182 days	Shiromani Akali Dal
14.	Jaswant Singh Sidhu	Mansa	2 June 1986	5 March 1988	1 year, 277 days	Shiromani Akali Dal
15.	Romesh Chander Dogra	Dasuya	7 April 1992	7 January 1996	3 years, 275 days	Indian National Congress (Indira)
16.	Naresh Thakur	Hoshiarpur	28 February 1996	11 February 1997	349 days	Indian National Congress (Indira)
17.	Swarna Ram	Phagwara	18 June 1997	26 July 1997	8 days	Bharatiya Janata Party
18.	Baldev Raj Chawla	Amritsar North	23 December 1997	31 December 1999	2 years, 8 days	Bharatiya Janata Party
19.	Satpal Gosain	Ludhiana East	5 September 2000	24 February 2002	1 year, 172 days	Bharatiya Janata Party
20.	Darbari Lal	Amritsar Central	26 June 2002	10 March 2003	257 days	Indian National Congress
21.	Bir Devinder Singh	Kharar	27 March 2003	9 July 2004	1 year, 104 days	Indian National Congress
(20)	Darbari Lal	Amritsar Central	12 July 2004	27 February 2007	2 years, 230 days	Indian National Congress
(19)	Satpal Gosain	Ludhiana East	16 March 2007	14 April 2011	4 years, 29 days	Bharatiya Janata Party
22.	Chuni Lal Bhagat	Jalandhar South	13 June 2011	6 March 2012	267 days	Bharatiya Janata Party
23.	Dinesh Singh	Sujanpur	20 March 2012	11 March 2017	4 years, 356 days	Bharatiya Janata Party
24.	Ajaib Singh Bhatti	Malout	16 June 2017	11 March 2022	4 years, 268 days	Indian National Congress
25.	Jai Krishan Singh	Garhshankar	30 June 2022	Incumbent	4 years, 106 days	Aam Aadmi Party

== Pro tem Speaker ==
After a general election and the formation of a new government, a list of senior Members in Vidhan Sabha prepared by the Legislative Section is submitted to the Minister of Parliamentary Affairs, who selects a pro tem speaker who holds the office of Speaker until a full time speaker is elected. However,, in Punjab mostly the pro tem speaker become the full time Speaker. The appointment has to be approved by the Governor.

The first meeting after the election when the speaker and the deputy speaker are selected by members of the Vidhan Sabha is held under the pro tem Speaker. In the absence of the speaker, the deputy speaker acts as speaker. In the absence of both, a committee of six members selected by the speaker will act as speaker according to their seniority.

The Speaker of the Assembly must:

- Be a citizen of India;
- Not be less than 25 years of age; and
- Not hold any office of profit under the Government of Punjab, India.

In Punjab Legislative Assembly mostly Pro-tem speaker is elected as Speaker.

=== List of Pro tem Speakers ===
Sr. no.	Year	Pro-tem Speaker	Elected Speaker
Before Independence
1	1937	Raja Narendra Nath	Shahab-ud-Di
2	1946	Satya Prakash Singha	
After Independence
1	1952	Satyapal	
2	1957	Gurdial Singh Dhillon	
3	1962	Prabodh Chandra	
4	1967	Lal Chand Sabharwal	Joginder Singh Mann
5	1969	Darbara Singh	
5	1972	Darbara Singh	
6	1977	Ravi Inder Singh	
7	1980	Gurdarshan Singh	Brij Bhushan Mehra
(6)	1985	Ravi Inder Singh	
8	1992	Harcharn Singh Ajnala	
9	1997	Charnjit Singh Atwal	
10	2002	Kewal Krishan	
11	2007	Nirmal Singh Kahlon	
(9)	2012	Charnjit Singh Atwal	
12	2017	Rana Kanwar Pal Singh	
13	2022	Inderbir Singh Nijjar	Kultar Singh Sandhwan
