= Harbans Bhalla =

Harbans Bhalla (7 May 1930 – 5 April 1993) was the author of Peelay Pattar, a long Urdu epic poem, a creation realized after 14 years of writing. He was a writer, poet, philosopher, and a scholar, who wrote in the Persian, Shahmukhi and Urdu languages.

== Biography ==
Harbans Bhalla was born in Pasrur, now in the Sialkot District of Pakistan. To his mother's pride, he wrote his first story in the 7th standard; It was titled Meri Mehbooba. After the partition of India in 1947 he moved to Amritsar, India. Rather than having been inspired by other writers, Bhalla's works came organically from his feelings. Bhalla had a unique writing style: for a given topic he wrote 20 – 1,000 verses and each started with the same word. He wrote more than 14 books which were written and published in several languages.

He penned an Urdu epic poem (Note: The Epic of Manas is claimed to be the longest epic poem in history, according to the authors of "Folklore: An Encyclopedia of Beliefs, Customs, Tales, Music, and Art." Mahabharata is also claimed to be the longest poem in history, according to Meta Chaya Hirschl, author of "Vital Yoga." The previous "longest verse poem", Shâhnameh, was written by Ferdowsi (or Phirdousi) in the 10th century. It was a 60 thousand verse poem that took 35 years to write.) titled Peelay Pattar (meaning yellow leaves) with 70,000 verses. Peelay Pattar is originally written in Shahmukhi language which is a variant of the Perso-Arabic script used to write the Punjabi language. It took him 14 years (From 1978 to 1992 )to complete the work and he hoped that it would make the Limca Book of Records. The first of ten volumes of the work will be released at the Punjabi University on 7 May 2013, which is the 83rd anniversary of his birth.

One of his stories Tazaaka was selected for a Hindi film. He subsequently received offers for his works to be included in Indian movies, but he rejected the offers. His works were published in newspapers. During his lifetime he was considered a "lesser known figure in the literary circles of Gujarat," India. After suffering from cancer, he died on 5 April 1993.

Harbans Bhalla married Veena Kapur on October 10, 1959. They have two children: a son, Monish Bhalla, and a daughter, Sarika. Monish Bhalla continued his writing legacy and has written more than 20 books.

== Published works ==
Some of his published works include:

- Peelay Pattar (Punjabi)
- Rekha (Gujarati)
- Ik Lehar Du Pathar
- Jad Phul Khidey (Punjabi)
- Zhanjar Dharti Di (Punjabi)
- Kani Kani Chandani (Punjabi)
- Piase Rishtey (Punjabi)
- Nike Nike Ghungru (Punjabi)
- Nari Ba Roop (Sindhi)
- Pyarji Rah Anagee (Sindhi)
- Khoon Patthar Pyar ( Sindhi)
- Akinchan Sambandho, a novel With N. A. Vora

== Poetic Journey ==
Harbans Bhalla is famous for his literary poetic work peele pattarwhich has almost 70,000 verses or rhythmic couplets. He took fourteen years to complete. Peelay Pattar is originally written in Shahmukhi language which is a variant of the Perso-Arabic script used to write the Punjabi language. It took him 14 years to complete the work and he hoped that it would make the Limca Book of Records.The first of ten volumes of the work will be released at the Punjabi University on 7 May 2013, which is the 83rd anniversary of his birth. 10 volumes of the magnum opus, “Peelay Pattar” was released at the 6th World Punjabi Conference by Punjab Vidhan Sabha speaker, Rana KP Singh.
