= Punjab Assembly Committee on Welfare of Scheduled Castes, Scheduled Tribes and Backward Classes =

Indian Legislative committee

Committee on Welfare of Scheduled Castes, Scheduled Tribes and Backward Classes
Committee of the House
- 16th Punjab Assembly
- State: Punjab

Leadership
- Chaiperson: Manjit Singh Bilaspur
- Chairperson party: Aam Aadmi Party
- Appointer: Punjab Assembly speaker

Structure
- Seats: 13
- Political Parties: AAP (11); INC (2); BSP (1)
- Election criteria: The members are elected every year from amongst its members of house according to the principle of proportional representation.
- Tenure: 1 Year

Jurisdiction
- Purpose: Legislative oversight of the Welfare of Scheduled Castes, Scheduled Tribes and Backward Classes

Rules & Procedure
- Applicable rules: Article 208 of the Constitution of India section 32 of the States Reorganisation Act, 1956; Rules 232(1) and 2(b) of Rules of Procedure and Conduct of Business in Punjab Legislative Assembly

Punjab Assembly Committee on Welfare of Scheduled Castes, Scheduled Tribes and Backward Classes of Punjab Legislative Assembly is constituted annually for a one-year period from among the members of the Assembly. The committee focuses on the Scheduled Castes and Scheduled Tribes and Other Backward Class of Punjab population.

== Functions ==
The functions of the committee are:

(a) to consider and examine the recommendations contained in the reports of the National Commission for Scheduled Castes and Scheduled Tribes, Government of India, in so far as the Punjab State is concerned and which fall within the purview of the State Government, and to report to the House as to the measures that should be taken by the State Government;
(b) to report to the House on the action taken by the Government on the measures proposed by the Committee;
(c) to examine the measures taken by the Government to secure due representation of the Scheduled Castes, Scheduled Tribes and Backward Classes in services and posts under its control( including appointments in the Public Sector Undertakings, Statutory and Semi-Government Bodies) having regard to the provisions of Article 335 of the Constitution;
(d) to report to the House on the working of the welfare programmes for the Scheduled Castes, Scheduled Tribes and Backward Classes; and
(e) to examine such other matters as may be specifically referred to it by the House or the Speaker

== Appointment ==
The speaker appoints the committee and its members every year for a one-year term according to the powers conferred by Article 208 of the Constitution of India read with section 32 of the States Reorganisation Act, 1956 (37 of 1956), and in pursuance of Rules 232(1) and 2(b) of the Rules of Procedure and Conduct of Business in the Punjab Legislative Assembly.

== Members ==
For the 1-year period starting May 2022, the Committee on Welfare of Scheduled Castes, Scheduled Tribes and Backward Classes of 16th Punjab Assembly had following members:

Committee on Welfare of SC, ST and OBC (2022–23)
Sr. No.	Name	Post	Party
1	Manjit Singh Bilaspur	Chairperson	AAP
2	Aruna Choudhary	Member	INC
3	Dalbir Singh Tong	Member	AAP
4	ADC Jaswinder Singh Ramdas	Member	AAP
5	Jiwan Singh Sangowal	Member	AAP
6	Jagsir Singh	Member	AAP
7	Kulwant Singh Bazigar	Member	AAP
8	Labh Singh Ugoke	Member	AAP
9	Dr Nacchatar Pal	Member	BSP
10	Rupinder Singh	Member	AAP
11	Rajnish Kumar Dahiya	Member	AAP
12	Sheetal Angural	Member	AAP
13	Sukhwinder Singh Kotli	Member	INC

== Chairpersons ==
Tenure	Terms	Name	Political party
14th Punjab Assembly	1	Nirmal Singh	Shiromani Akali Dal
2017-2018	1	Raj Kumar Verka	Indian National Congress
2018-2022	4	Nathu Ram	Indian National Congress
2022–23	1	Manjit Singh Bilaspur	Aam Aadmi Party

== Previous members ==
For the 1-year period before May 2022, the Committee on Welfare of Scheduled Castes, Scheduled Tribes and Backward Classes of 15th Punjab Assembly had following members:

=== 2021-2022 ===
Committee on Welfare of SC, ST and OBC (2021–22)
Sr. No.	Name	Post	Party
1	Nathu Ram	Chairperson	INC
2	Balwinder Singh	Member	INC
3	Balwinder Singh Dhaliwal	Member	INC
4	Baldev Singh Khera	Member	INC
5	Gurpreet Singh	Member	INC
6	Joginder Pal	Member	INC
7	Kulwant Singh Pandori	Member	INC
8	Lakhavir Singh Lakha	Member	INC
9	Manjit Singh	Member	INC
10	Dr.Raj kumar Chabbewal	Member	INC
11	Surjit Singh Dhiman	Member	INC
12	Sukhwinder Kumar	Member	INC
13	Santokh Singh	Member	INC

=== 2020-2021 ===
Committee on Welfare of SC, ST and OBC (2020–21)
Sr. No.	Name	Post	Party
1	Nathu Ram	Chairperson	INC
2	Balwinder Singh	Member	INC
3	Balwinder Singh Dhaliwal	Member	INC
4	Gurpreet Singh	Member	INC
5	Joginder Pal	Member	INC
6	Lakhavir Singh Lakha	Member	INC
7	Manjit Singh	Member	INC
8	Pawan Kumar Tinu	Member	INC
9	Dr.Raj kumar Chabbewal	Member	INC
10	Smt Rupinder Kaur Rubi	Member	INC
11	Sukhwinder Kumar	Member	INC
12	Santokh Singh	Member	INC
13	Surjit Singh Dhiman	Member	INC

=== 2019-2020 ===
Committee on Welfare of SC, ST and OBC (2019–20)
Sr. No.	Name	Post	Party
1	Nathu Ram	Chairperson	INC
2	Baldev Singh Khaira	Member	INC
3	Joginder Pal	Member	INC
4	Kulwant Singh Pandori	Member	INC
5	Nirmal Singh	Member	INC
6	Pawan Kumar Adia	Member	INC
7	Dr. Raj Kumar Chabewal	Member	INC
8	S.Santokh Singh	Member	INC
9	Smt .Sarvjit Kaur Manuke	Member	INC
10	Smt Satkar Kaur	Member	INC
11	Sukhwinder Kumar	Member	INC
12	Ch. Surinder Singh	Member	INC
13	Surjit Singh Dhiman	Member	INC

=== 2018-2019 ===
Committee on Welfare of SC, ST and OBC (2018–19)
Sr. No.	Name	Post	Party
1	Nathu Ram	Chairperson	INC
2	Baldev Singh Khaira	Member	INC
3	Balwinder Singh	Member	INC
4	Darshan Lal	Member	INC
5	Surjit Singh Dhiman	Member	INC
6	Kulwant Singh Pandori	Member	INC
7	Manjit Singh	Member	INC
8	Nirmal Singh	Member	INC
9	Pawan Kumar Adia	Member	INC
10	Dr. Raj Kumar Chabewal	Member	INC
11	Sukhwinder Singh Danny Bandala	Member	INC
12	Sukhwinder Singh	Member	INC
13	Tarsem Singh D.C.	Member	INC

=== 2017-2018 ===
Committee on Welfare of SC, ST and OBC (2017–17)
Sr. No.	Name	Post	Party
1	Dr. Raj Kumar Verka	Chairperson	INC
2	Baldev Singh Khaira	Member	INC
3	Harpal Singh Cheema	Member	AAP
4	Joginder Pal	Member	INC
5	Manjit Singh	Member	INC
6	Nathu Ram	Member	INC
7	Nirmal Singh	Member	INC
8	Santokh Singh	Member	INC
9	Sukhwinder Singh Danny Bandala	Member	INC
10	Ch . Surinder Singh	Member	INC
11	Surjit Singh Dhiman	Member	INC
12	Sushil Kumar Rinku	Member	INC
13	Sukhwinder Kumar	Member	INC
