= Nirmal Singh (judge) =

Indian politician and judge

Justice Nirmal Singh

Member of Punjab Legislative Assembly
- In office 2012–2017
- Succeeded by: Gurpreet Singh
- Constituency: Bassi Pathana

Jammu & Kashmir High Court
- In office 18 March 2005 – 06 September 2009
- Nominated by: Ramesh Chandra Lahoti
- Appointed by: A.P.J. Abdul Kalam

Punjab and Haryana High Court
- In office 12 May 2000 – 17 March 2005
- Nominated by: Adarsh Sein Anand
- Appointed by: K.R. Narayanan

Personal details
- Born: 6 September 1947 Rampur, Fatehgarh Sahib, Punjab
- Party: Shiromani Akali Dal (2009-2020), Shiromani Akali Dal (Democratic) (2020-Present)
- Spouse: Paramjit Kaur Gulshan
- Relations: Dhanna Singh Gulshan (father-in-law)
- Children: 2 daughters

Justice Nirmal Singh is an Indian politician and former high court judge.

== Early life ==
Nirmal Singh was born to Sardar Gurdial Singh and Bachan Kaur at Rampur, Fatehgarh Sahib district, Punjab.

In 1964 he completed matriculation from National High School (Balahri Kalan), in 1969 he did B.A. and in 1972 completed his LLB from Panjab University.

He is married to Paramjit Kaur Gulshan, daughter of Dhanna Singh Gulshan. Both his wife and father-in-law were Members of Parliament and Union Minister.

== Judge career ==
In 1996 he became District & Session Judge and also served as D & SJ, Vigilance, Punjab.

In 2000 he became a permanent judge of Punjab and Haryana High Court and served till 2005. He was then appointed judge of Jammu & Kashmir High Court and then he retired in 2009.

== Political career ==
He then joined Shiromani Akali Dal and was elected to the 2012 Punjab Legislative Assembly elections from newly created Bassi Pathana assembly constituency. He also fought in 2017 Punjab Legislative Assembly elections from Chakaur Sahib constituency but lost to Charanjit Singh Channi.

He joined Sukhdev Singh Dhindsa's group alleging SAD was promoting caste-based discrimination and differences with interstate water disputes. Later he was expelled from the party and he joined Shiromani Akali Dal (Democratic).

Chairman of Committee on Welfare of Scheduled Castes, Scheduled Tribes and Backward Classes and Member of Committee on Privileges and House Committee of Punjab Legislative Assembly. He is also a life member of The Indian Council of Arbitration and Interstate Water Disputes Tribunal. He also attended Conference on Women Empowerment in Bangladesh.

Committee assignments of Punjab Legislative Assembly

- Chairman Committee on Welfare of Scheduled Castes, Scheduled Tribes and Backward Classes
- Member Committee on Privileges
- Member House Committee
