= Punjab Assembly House Committee =

House Committee
Committee of the House
- 16th Punjab Assembly
- State: Punjab

Leadership
- Chairperson: Jai Krishan Singh
- Chairperson party: Aam Aadmi Party
- Appointer: Punjab Assembly speaker

Structure
- Seats: 9
- Political Parties: AAP (8); INC (1)
- Election criteria: The members are elected every year from amongst its members of house according to the principle of proportional representation.
- Tenure: 1 Year

Jurisdiction
- Purpose: To consider and advise upon matters connected with the members of the House

Rules & Procedure
- Applicable rules: Article 208 of the Constitution of India section 32 of the States Reorganisation Act, 1956; Rules 232(1) and 2(b) of Rules of Procedure and Conduct of Business in Punjab Legislative Assembly

Punjab Assembly House Committee of Punjab Legislative Assembly is constituted annually for a one year period from among the members of the Assembly. This Committee consists of nine members. The purpose of the committee is "to consider and advise upon matters connected with the comfort and convenience of members of the House".

== Appointment ==
The speaker appoints the committee and its members every year for a one year term according to the powers conferred by Article 208 of the Constitution of India read with section 32 of the States Reorganisation Act, 1956 (37 of 1956), and in pursuance of Rules 232(1) and 2(b) of the Rules of Procedure and Conduct of Business in the Punjab Legislative Assembly.

== Members ==
For the one year period starting May 2022, the House Committee of 16th Punjab Assembly had following members:

House Committee (2022–23)
Sr. No.	Name	Post	Party
1	Jai Krishan Singh	Chairperson	AAP
2	Inderbir Singh Nijjar	Member	AAP
3	Ajay Gupta	Member	AAP
4	Amrit Pal Singh Sukhanand	Member	AAP
5	Chetan Singh Jouramajra	Member	AAP
6	Ravjot Singh	Member	AAP
7	Hakam Singh Thekedar	Member	AAP
8	Karambir Singh Ghuman	Member	AAP
9	Pargat Singh Powar	Member	INC

== Chairpersons ==
Tenure	Terms	Name	Political party
2017-22	5	Ajaib Singh Bhatti	Indian National Congress
2022-23	1	Jai Krishan Singh	Aam Aadmi Party

== Previous members ==
=== 2021-2022 ===
Committee on House Committee (2021–22)
Sr. No.	Name	Post	Party
1.	Ajaib Singh Bhatti	Ex-Officio Chairperson	INC
2.	Amrik Singh Dhillon	Member	INC
3.	Harjot Kamal Singh	Member	INC
4.	Indu Bala	Member	INC
5.	Kulwant Singh Pandori	Member	INC
6.	Manjit Singh Billaspur	Member	INC
7.	Navjot Singh Sidhu	Member	INC
8.	Rajinder Beri	Member	INC
9.	Sharanjit Singh Dhillon	Member	INC

=== 2019-2020 ===
Committee on House Committee (2019–20)
Sr. No.	Name	Post	Party
1.	Ajaib Singh Bhatti	Ex-Officio Chairperson	INC
2.	Amrik Singh Dhillon	Member	INC
3.	Aman Arora	Member	AAP
4.	Budh Ram	Member	INC
5.	Harjot Kamal Singh	Member	INC
6.	N. K. Sharma	Member	INC
7.	S.Pargat Singh Powar	Member	INC
8.	Ramanjit Singh Sahota Sikki	Member	INC
9.	Sukhwinder Singh Danny Bandala	Member	INC

=== 2018-2019 ===
Committee on House Committee (2018–19)
Sr. No.	Name	Post	Party
1.	Ajaib Singh Bhatti	Ex-Officio Chairperson	INC
2.	Aman Arora	Member	AAP
3.	H. S. Phoolka	Member	AAP
4.	N. K. Sharma	Member	INC
5.	Rajinder Singh	Member	INC
6.	Sukhjit Singh	Member	INC
7.	Surinder Kumar Dawar	Member	INC
8.	Sushil Kumar Rinku	Member	INC
9.	Thekedar Madan Lal Jalalpur	Member	INC

=== 2017-2018 ===
Committee on House Committee (2017–18)
Sr. No.	Name	Post	Party
1.	Ajaib Singh Bhatti	Ex-Officio Chairperson	INC
2.	Ajit Singh Kohar	Member	INC
3.	Amarinder Singh Raja Warring	Member	INC
4.	Barindermeet Singh Pahra	Member	INC
5.	Gurmeet Singh Meet Hehar	Member	INC
6.	Kulbir Singh Zira	Member	INC
7.	Kuldeep Singh Vaid Bulara	Member	INC
8.	Nazar Singh Manshahia	Member	INC
9.	Thekedar Madan Lal Jalalpur	Member	INC
