= Kultar Singh Sandhwan =

Indian politician

- Kultar Singh Sandhwan in 2023

18th Speaker of the Punjab Legislative Assembly
- Incumbent
- Assumed office 21 March 2022
- Deputy Speaker: Jai Krishan
- Chief Minister: Bhagwant Maan
- Preceded by: Rana K. P. Singh

Member of the Punjab Legislative Assembly
- Incumbent
- Assumed office 16 March 2017
- Constituency: Kotkapura

Personal details
- Born: 16 April 1975 (age 51) Kotkapura, Punjab, India
- Party: Aam Aadmi Party
- Occupation: Politician

Kultar Singh Sandhwan is an Indian politician who is currently serving as the 18th and current Speaker of the Punjab Legislative Assembly from March 21, 2022. Kultar’s grandfather Jangir Singh and Giani Zail Singh (who served as the president of India from 1982 to 1987 and chief minister of Punjab from 1972 to 1977) were brothers. Sandhwan is also MLA representing the Kotkapura Assembly constituency. He is a member of the Aam Aadmi Party.

== Member of Legislative Assembly ==
=== First term (2017-2022) ===
Committee assignments of 15th Punjab Legislative Assembly

Chairman;Public Accounts Committee

- Member (2017-2019) Library Committee
- Member Committee on Subordinate Legislation
- Member (2021-2022) Committee on Papers laid/to be laid on the table and Library

=== Second term (2022-present) ===
The Aam Aadmi Party gained a strong 79% majority in the Sixteenth Punjab Legislative Assembly by winning 92 out of 117 seats in the 2022 Punjab Legislative Assembly election. MP Bhagwant Mann was sworn in as Chief Minister on 16 March 2022.

He was elected as the speaker of the 16th Punjab Assembly.

== Electoral performance ==
Punjab Assembly election, 2017: Kotkapura
Party	Candidate	Votes	%	±%
AAP	Kultar Singh Sandhwan	47,401	38.8	
INC	Bhai Harnirpal Singh Kukku	37,326	30.5	
SAD	Mantar Singh Brar	33,895	27.7	
NOTA	None of the above	674	0.4	
Majority		10,075	8.3	
Turnout		121,629	80.5	
Registered electors		151,950		

Punjab Assembly election, 2022: Kotkapura
Party	Candidate	Votes	%	±%
AAP	Kultar Singh Sandhwan	54,009	43.81	
INC	Ajaypal Singh Sandhu	32,879	26.67	
SAD	Mantar Singh Brar	29,576	24.2	
SAD(A)	Jaskaran Singh Kahan Singh Wala	2,606	2.1	
PLC	Dargesh Kumar	1,045	0.9	
NOTA	None of the above	889	0.6	
Majority		21,130	17.14	
Turnout		123,267	76.93	
Registered electors		160,216		
AAP hold				

State Legislative Assembly
Preceded by -	Member of the Punjab Legislative Assembly from Kotkapura Assembly constituency 2017 –	Incumbent
