= Punjab Assembly Committee on Public Undertakings =

Indian Legislative committee

Committee on Public Undertakings
Committee of the House
- 16th Punjab Assembly
- State: Punjab

Leadership
- Chaiperson: Budh Ram
- Chairperson party: Aam Aadmi Party
- Appointer: Punjab Assembly speaker

Structure
- Seats: 12
- Political Parties: AAP (10); INC (2)
- Election criteria: The members are elected every year from amongst its members of house according to the principle of proportional representation.
- Tenure: 1 Year

Jurisdiction
- Purpose: Legislative oversight of Public Undertakings

Rules & Procedure
- Applicable rules: Article 208 of the Constitution of India section 32 of the States Reorganisation Act, 1956; Rules 232(1) and 2(b) of Rules of Procedure and Conduct of Business in Punjab Legislative Assembly

Punjab Assembly Committee on Public Undertakings of Punjab Legislative Assembly is constituted annually for a one-year period from among the members of the Assembly.

== Functions ==
The functions of the Committee on Public Undertakings is:

(a) To examine the reports and accounts of the Public undertakings specified in Schedule II and of such other Public Undertakings as may be referred to the Committee by the Speaker for examination;
(b) To examine the reports, if any, of the Comptroller and Auditor-General on the public undertakings;
(c) To examine in the context of the autonomy and efficiency of public undertakings, whether the affairs of the public undertakings are being managed in accordance with sound business principles and prudent commercial practices; and
(d) To exercise such other functions vested in the Committee on Public Accounts and the Committee on Estimates in relation to the Public undertakings mentioned above as are not covered by clauses (a), (b) and (c) above and as may be allotted to the Committee by the Speaker from time to time :

Provided that the Committee shall not examine and investigate any of the following, namely:-

(i) Matters of major Government policy as distinct from business or commercial functions of the public undertakings;
(ii) Matters of day-to-day administration;
(iii) Matters for the consideration of which machinery is established by any special statue under which a particular public undertaking is established

== Appointment ==
The speaker appoints the committee and its members every year for a one-year term according to the powers conferred by Article 208 of the Constitution of India read with section 32 of the States Reorganisation Act, 1956 (37 of 1956), and in pursuance of Rules 232(1) and 2(b) of the Rules of Procedure and Conduct of Business in the Punjab Legislative Assembly.

== Members ==
For the 1-year period starting May 2022, the Committee on Public Undertakings of 16th Punjab Assembly had following members:

Committee on Public Undertakings (2022–23)
Sr. No.	Name	Post	Party
1.	Budh Ram	Chairperson	AAP
2.	Amarpal Singh	Member	AAP
3.	Amrinder Singh Raja Warring	Member	INC
4.	Avtar Singh Junior	Member	INC
5.	Fauja Singh Sarari	Member	AAP
6.	Gurdit Singh Sekhon	Member	AAP
7.	Gurlal Ghanaur	Member	AAP
8.	Jai Krishan Singh	Member	AAP
9.	Jasbir Singh Sandhu	Member	AAP
10.	Manjinder Singh Lalpura	Member	AAP
11.	Manwinder Singh Giaspura	Member	AAP
12.	Sarvan Singh Dhun	Member	AAP

== Chairpersons ==
Tenure	Terms	Name	Political party
2017-18	1	Om Parkash Soni	Indian National Congress
2018-19	1	Rakesh Pandey	Indian National Congress
2019-21	2	Kuljit Singh Nagra	Indian National Congress
2021-22	1	Navtej Singh Cheema	Indian National Congress
2022–23	1	Budh Ram	Aam Aadmi Party

== Previous members ==
For the one-year period before May 2022, the Committee on Public Undertakings of 15th Punjab Assembly had following members:

=== 2021–22 ===
Committee on Public Undertakings (2021–22)
Sr. No.	Name	Post	Party
1.	Sardar Navtej Singh Cheema	Chairperson	INC
2.	Shri Aman Arora	Member	INC
3.	Shri Arun Dogra	Member	INC
4.	Sardar Bikram Singh Majithia	Member	INC
5.	Shri Dalvir Singh Goldy	Member	INC
6.	Shri Darshan Lal	Member	INC
7.	Shri N.K. Sharma	Member	INC
8.	Sardar Rajinder Singh	Member	INC
9.	Sardar Sangat Singh Gilzian	Member	INC
10.	Shri Sanjeev Talwar	Member	INC
11.	Smt. Sarvjit Kaur Manuke	Member	INC
12.	Sardar Sukhwinder Singh Danny	Member	INC
13.	Chaudhary Surinder Singh	Member	

=== 2020–21 ===
Committee on Public Undertakings (2020–21)
Sr. No.	Name	Post	Party
1.	Sardar Kuljit Singh Nagra	Chairperson	INC
2.	Shri Aman Arora	Member	INC
3.	Sardar Rajinder Singh	Member	INC
4.	Shri Arun Dogra	Member	INC
5.	Sardar Bikram Singh Majithia	Member	INC
6.	Shri Dalvir Singh Goldy	Member	INC
7.	Shri N.K. Sharma	Member	INC
8.	Sardar Sukhwinder Singh Danny	Member	INC
9.	Sardar Ramanjeet Singh Sikki	Member	INC
10.	Sardar Sangat Singh Gilzian	Member	INC
11.	Smt. Sarvjit Kaur Manuke	Member	INC
12.	Shri Sanjeev Talwar	Member	INC
13.	Chaudhary Surinder Singh	Member	

=== 2019–20 ===
Committee on Public Undertakings (2019–20)
Sr. No.	Name	Post	Party
1.	Sardar Kuljit Singh Nagra	Chairperson	INC
2.	Shri Aman Arora	Member	INC
3.	Sardar Amrinder Singh Raja warring	Member	INC
4.	Sardar Darshan Singh Brar	Member	INC
5.	Sardar Davinder Singh Ghubaya	Member	INC
6.	Sardar Dilraj Singh Bhunder	Member	INC
7.	Sardar Kanwar Sandhu	Member	INC
8.	Shri Pawan Kumar Adia	Member	INC
9.	Shri Pawan Kumar Tinu	Member	INC
10.	Shri Rajinder Beri	Member	INC
11.	Shmt Indu Bala	Member	INC
12.	Sardar Santokh Singh	Member	INC
13.	Sardar Sukhwinder Singh Danny Bandala	Member	

=== 2018–19 ===
Committee on Public Undertakings (2018–19)
Sr. No.	Name	Post	Party
1.	Sh. Rakesh Panday	Chairperson	INC
2.	Sardar Amarjit Singh Sandoa	Member	INC
3.	Sardar Angad Singh	Member	INC
4.	Sardar Harinder Pal Singh Chandumajra	Member	INC
5.	Sardar Kultar Singh Sandhwan	Member	INC
6.	Sardar Nirmal Singh	Member	INC
7.	Sardar Pargat Singh Powar	Member	INC
8.	Sardar Parminder Singh Dhindsa	Member	INC
9.	Sardar Randeep Singh Nabha	Member	INC
10.	Dr. Raj Kumar Chabbewal	Member	INC
11.	Smt. Satkar Kaur	Member	INC
12.	Sh. Surinder Kumar Dawar	Member	INC
13.	Dr. Harjot Kamal Singh	Member	

=== 2017–18 ===
Committee on Public Undertakings (2017–18)
Sr. No.	Name	Post	Party
1.	Sh. Om Parkash Soni	Chairperson	INC
2.	Sardar Ajit Singh Kohar	Member	INC
3.	Sh. Arun Dogra	Member	INC
4.	Sardar Bikram Singh Majithia	Member	INC
5.	Sardar Gurpreet Singh Kangar	Member	INC
6.	Sardar Gurmeet Singh Meet Haher	Member	INC
7.	Sardar Gurkirat Singh Kotli	Member	INC
8.	Sardar Lakhvir Singh Lakha	Member	INC
9.	Sardar Navtej Singh Cheema	Member	INC
10.	Sardar Parminder Singh Pinki	Member	INC
11.	Sardar Pargat Singh Powar	Member	INC
12.	Sardar Sukhpal Singh Khaira	Member	INC
13.	Sardar Sukhpal Singh Bhullar	Member	
