= Kum Kalan Assembly constituency =

Former constituency of the Punjab Legislative Assembly

Coordinates: 30.91°N 76.07°E

Kum Kalan
- Former constituency No. 62 for the Punjab Legislative Assembly

Constituency details
- Country: India
- State: Punjab
- District: Ludhiana
- Lok Sabha constituency: Ludhiana
- Established: 1967
- Abolished: 2012
- Total electors: 144,962 (2002)
- Reservation: SC

Kum Kalan was a Punjab Legislative Assembly constituency till 2012.

== Members of the Legislative Assembly ==
Year	Member	Party
1967	G.M. Singh	Indian National Congress
1969	Partap Singh	Shiromani Akali Dal
1972	Rattan Singh	Indian National Congress
1977	Daya Singh	Communist Party of India (Marxist)
1980	Daya Singh	Communist Party of India (Marxist)
1985	Rajinder Singh	Shiromani Akali Dal
1992	Isher Singh	Indian National Congress
1997	Charanjit Singh Atwal	Shiromani Akali Dal
2002	Inder Iqbal Singh Atwal	Shiromani Akali Dal
2007	Ishar Singh	Indian National Congress

== Election results ==
=== 2007 ===
Punjab Assembly election, 2007: Kum Kalan
Party	Candidate	Votes	%	±%
INC	Ishar Singh	55,082	48.73	▲3.78
SAD	Inder Iqbal Singh Atwal	53,017	46.91	▼1.10
LBP	Balwinder Singh Lalka	2,207	1.95	New entry
BSP	Gian Singh	1,934	1.71	▼1.99
LJP	Harjit Singh Bawa	788	0.70	New entry
Majority		2,065	1.83	
Turnout		113,028		
Registered electors				
INC gain from SAD		Swing		

=== 2002 ===
Punjab Legislative Assembly Election, 2002: Kum Kalan
Party	Candidate	Votes	%	±%
SAD	Inder Iqbal Singh Atwal	45,026	47.71	▼2.54
INC	Ishar Singh	42,420	44.95	▲9.49
BSP	Inderjit Singh Advocate	3,489	3.70	New entry
SAD(M)	Harjinder Kumar Jakhu	2,773	2.94	▼2.66
RLD	Gurmail Singh Uddowal	665	0.70	New entry
Majority		2,606	2.76	
Turnout		94,373	65.10	
Registered electors		144,962		
SAD hold		Swing		

=== 1997 ===
Punjab Legislative Assembly Election, 1997: Kum Kalan
Party	Candidate	Votes	%	±%
SAD	Charanjit Singh Atwal	45,616	50.25	New entry
INC	Ishar Singh	32,193	35.46	▼34.67
Independent	Surjit Singh	7,888	8.69	New entry
SAD(M)	Narinder Singh	5,087	5.60	New entry
Majority		13,423	14.79	
Turnout		90,784	69.27	
Registered electors		133,344		
SAD gain from INC		Swing		
