= Gurdit Singh Sekhon =

Indian politician

MLA, Punjab Legislative Assembly
- Incumbent
- Assumed office 2022
- Constituency: Faridkot
- Majority: Aam Aadmi Party

Personal details
- Party: Aam Aadmi Party
- Spouse: Beant Kaur Sekhon
- Known for: Former basketball player and coach, Philanthropist

Gurdit Singh Sekhon is an Indian politician and the MLA representing the Faridkot Assembly constituency in the Punjab Legislative Assembly. He is a member of the Aam Aadmi Party. He was elected as the MLA in the 2022 Punjab Legislative Assembly election.

== Member of Legislative Assembly ==
He represents the Faridkot Assembly constituency as MLA in Punjab Assembly. The Aam Aadmi Party gained a strong 79% majority in the sixteenth Punjab Legislative Assembly by winning 92 out of 117 seats in the 2022 Punjab Legislative Assembly election. MP Bhagwant Mann was sworn in as Chief Minister on 16 March 2022.

Committee assignments of Punjab Legislative Assembly

- Member (2022–23) Committee on Public Undertakings
- Member (2022–23) Committee on Papers laid/to be laid on the table and Library

== Electoral performance ==
Punjab Assembly election, 2022: Faridkot
Party	Candidate	Votes	%	±%
AAP	Gurdit Singh Sekhon	53,484	41.18	
SAD	Parambans Singh Romana	36,687	28.25	
INC	Kushaldeep Singh Dhillon	33,255	25.6	
BJP	Gaurav Kakkar	2,424	1.87	
SAD(A)	Gursawak Singh Bhana	1,563	1.2	
NOTA	None of the above	732	0.56	
Majority		16,797	12.93	
Registered electors		169,823		
AAP gain from INC		Swing		

State Legislative Assembly
Preceded by -	Member of the Punjab Legislative Assembly from Faridkot Assembly constituency 2022 –	Incumbent
