= Baldev Singh Ballamgarh =

Indian politician

Baldev Singh Ballamgarh is an Indian politician. He was born circa 1948. During his college years he was active in student movement, and was the state president of the Punjab Students Federation. He studied up to BA second year at Government College, Muktsar. He abandoned his studied as the 1972 Moga students protests began.

For 25 years Baldev Singh Ballamgarh was a member of the Communist Party of India (CPI). He stood as the CPI candidate for the Malout seat in the 1980 Punjab Legislative Assembly election, finishing in second place with 22,298 votes (48.34%). He lost the election by a margin of just 157 votes. He contested the 1985 Punjab Legislative Assembly election on an independent ticket, finishing in third place with 9,944 votes (17.69%).

Baldev Singh Ballamgarh broke with CPI, and joined the United Communist Party of India (UCPI). He contested the Malout seat in the 1992 Punjab Legislative Assembly election, standing as a UCPI candidate. He won the seat, obtaining 14,442 votes (36.96%). He joined the Congress-I in 1993. On July 15, 1993 Baldev Singh Ballamgarh, being the sole UCPI legislator, requested to be recognised as part of the Congress-I Legislature Party. His request was endorsed by Sardar Beant Singh, as the head of the Punjab Pradesh Congress-I Committee. On July 16, 1993 Deputy Speaker (acting as the Speaker) Romesh Chander Dogra approved the merger of the erstwhile UCPI legislator into the Congress-I Legislature Party. He was the chairman of the Punjab Scheduled Caste Corporation.

He contested the Malout seat in the 1997 Punjab Legislative Assembly election as an independent candidate, finishing in third place with 12,149 votes (14.89%).

Ahead of the 1998 parliamentary election, Baldev Singh Ballamgarh joined the Shiromani Akali Dal 'unconditionally', at a meeting attended by Sukhbir Singh Badal.

Baldev Singh Ballamgarh stood as the Nationalist Congress Party (NCP) candidate in Malout in the 2002 Punjab Legislative Assembly election, but Captain Amarinder Singh managed to convince him to withdraw his candidature and pledged to support the Congress-CPI combine. After the announcement, Captain Amarinder Singh visited Baldev Singh Ballamgarh's house.

On January 6, 2012 Baldev Singh Ballamgarh announced that he would contest the Malout seat in the 2012 Punjab Legislative Assembly election as an independent, in reaction to the Congress having nominated Nathu Ram as its candidate. Baldev Singh Ballamgarh finished in fourth place with 3,949 votes (3.16%). Later the same year, on September 4, 2012 he and other local Congress leaders joined the Shiromani Akali Dal at a Muktsar meeting attended by SAD president Sukhbir Singh Badal. On December 18, 2014 Sukhbir Singh Badal inducted Baldev Singh Ballamgarh into the SAD Political Affairs Committee.
