= Faridkot Assembly constituency =

Legislative Assembly constituency in Punjab State, India

Coordinates: 30.68°N 74.75°E

Faridkot
- Constituency No. 87 for the Punjab Legislative Assembly

Constituency details
- Country: India
- State: Punjab
- District: Faridkot
- Lok Sabha constituency: Faridkot
- Total electors: 169,823 (in 2022)
- Reservation: None

Member of Legislative Assembly
- 16th Punjab Legislative Assembly
- Incumbent Gurdit Singh Sekhon
- Party: Aam Aadmi Party
- Elected year: 2022

Faridkot Assembly constituency is one of the 117 Legislative Assembly constituencies of Punjab state in India. It is part of Faridkot district.

== Members of the Legislative Assembly ==
Most successful parties from Faridkot Vidhan Sabha
1. INC (6 Times) (33.3%)
2. SAD (6 Times) (33.3%)
3. IND (4 Times) (22.2%)
4. AD – SFS (1 Time) (5.56%)
5. AAP (1 Time) (5.56%)

Year	Member	Party
As part of Punjab Legislative Assembly (1956–Present)
2022	Gurdit Singh Sekhon	Aam Aadmi Party
2017	Kushaldeep Singh Dhillon	Indian National Congress
2012	Deep Malhotra	Shiromani Akali Dal
2007	Avtar Singh Brar	Indian National Congress
2002	Kushaldeep Singh Dhillon	Shiromani Akali Dal
1997	Avtar Singh Brar	Indian National Congress
1992	Avtar Singh Brar	Indian National Congress
1985	Karnail Singh Doad	Independent
1982 (By-elections)	Jagdish Kaur	Shiromani Akali Dal
1980	Jasmat Singh Dhillon	Independent
1977	Manmohan Singh Brar	Shiromani Akali Dal
1972 (SC)	Durdev Singh	Shiromani Akali Dal
1969 (SC)	Bhagat Singh	Shiromani Akali Dal
1967 (SC)	B. Singh	Akali Dal - Sant Fateh Singh
1962	Giani Zail Singh	Indian National Congress
1957	Mehar Singh	Indian National Congress
As part of Patiala and East Punjab States Union Legislative Assembly (1951–56)
1954	Harindar Singh (H.H. Raja)	Independent
1951	Hazura Singh	Independent

== Election results ==
=== 2027 ===
Punjab Assembly election, 2027: Faridkot
Party	Candidate	Votes	%	±%
AAP				
AD (WPD)				New entry
INC				
BSP				
SAD				
BJP				
NOTA	None of the above			
Majority				
Turnout				

=== 2022 ===
Punjab Assembly election, 2022: Faridkot
Party	Candidate	Votes	%	±%
AAP	Gurdit Singh Sekhon	53,484	41.18	
SAD	Parambans Singh Romana	36,687	28.25	
INC	Kushaldeep Singh Dhillon	33,255	25.6	
BJP	Gaurav Kakkar	2,424	1.87	
SAD(A)	Gursawak Singh Bhana	1,563	1.2	
NOTA	None of the above	732	0.56	
Majority		16,797	12.93	
Registered electors		169,823		
AAP gain from INC		Swing		

=== 2017 ===
Punjab Assembly election, 2017: Faridkot
Party	Candidate	Votes	%	±%
INC	Kushaldeep Singh Dhillon	51,026	40.4	
AAP	Gurdit Singh Sekhon	39,367	31.1	
SAD	Parambans Singh Bunty Romana	32,612	25.8	
NOTA	None of the above	759	0.5	
Majority		11,659	9.3	
Turnout		125,661	82.0	
Registered electors		154,149		

== See also ==
- List of constituencies of the Punjab Legislative Assembly
- Faridkot district
