= Mantar Singh Brar =

Indian politician

Member of the Punjab Legislative Assembly
- In office 1997-2007
- Preceded by: Upinder Sharma
- Succeeded by: Ripjit Singh Brar
- Constituency: Kotkapura

Member of the Punjab Legislative Assembly
- In office 2012-2017
- Preceded by: Ripjit Singh Brar
- Succeeded by: Kultar Singh Sandhwan
- Constituency: Kotkapura

Personal details
- Born: 3 November 1964 (age 61) Sandhwan, Distt.Faridkot
- Party: Shiromani Akali Dal
- Spouse: Amanjit Kaur
- Children: 1 son & 1 daughter
- Parents: Jaswinder Singh Brar (father); Manjit Kaur (mother)
- Education: Punjabi University
- Profession: Agriculture; Business
- Website: Mantar Singh Brar on Facebook; Mantar Singh Brar on Instagram

Mantar Singh Brar (born 3 November 1964) is an Indian politician and former Chief Parliamentary Secretary in the Punjab Government. He won 1997 Punjab Legislative Assembly elections from the Kotkapura constituency, and again won in 2002 and 2012. He is the son of Jaswinder Singh Brar, former Minister of Cooperation and former Leader of Opposition in the Punjab Government.

== Personal life ==
Brar was born in 1964, to father Jaswinder Singh Brar and mother Manjit Kaur. He did his B.A. from Brijindra College, Faridkot. He went on to do M.A. in History from Punjabi University, Patiala. He is married to Amanjit Kaur who is a teacher by profession. He has one son and one daughter. His brother Kultar Singh Brar was elected as chairman of Zila Parishad, Faridkot in 2013.

== Political career ==
Brar was first elected to Punjab Legislative Assembly in 1997 as an independent candidate. Brar won this election by a margin of 16,000 votes.

He was re-elected to Punjab Legislative Assembly in the year 2002 defeating Vibha Sharma.

He was appointed district president of the Shiromani Akali Dal for Faridkot in 2008 by newly elected party president Sukhbir Singh Badal, a position he has held to this day.

In 2012, he was again elected to Punjab Legislative Assembly, defeating Ripjit Singh Brar of INC. Shiromani Akali Dal formed the government and he was made the Chief Parliamentary Secretary for rural development and panchayats.

In December 2022, Brar was appointed as the senior vice-president of Shiromani Akali Dal.

== Electoral performance ==
=== 2012 ===
Punjab Legislative Assembly Election, 2012: Kotkapura
Party	Candidate	Votes	%	±%
SAD	Mantar Singh Brar	49,361	44.28	
INC	Ripjeet Singh Brar	31,175	27.96	
Independent	Upinder Sharma	15,202		
Turnout		111,499		

=== 2002 ===
Punjab Legislative Assembly Election, 2002: Kotkapura
Party	Candidate	Votes	%	±%
SAD	Mantar Singh Brar	42,725	39.9	−8.65
INC	Prof. Vibha Sharma	40,986		
Independent	Kartar Singh	11,104		
Turnout		107,069		

=== 1997 ===
Punjab Legislative Assembly Election, 1997: Kotkapura
Party	Candidate	Votes	%	±%
Independent	Mantar Singh Brar	50,562	48.56	new
SAD	Mohinder Singh	34,933		
INC	Joginder Singh	18,278		
Turnout		104,123		
