= Luv Kumar Goldy =

Indian politician

Member of the Punjab Legislative Assembly from Garhshankar Assembly Constituency
- In office 2004–2012
- Preceded by: Avinash Rai Khanna
- Succeeded by: Surinder Singh Bhulewal Rathan
- Constituency: Garhshankar Assembly Constituency

Personal details
- Party: Indian National Congress
- Other political affiliations: Punjab Lok Congress; Bharatiya Janata Party

Luv Kumar Goldy is a two-time MLA of the Punjab Legislative Assembly for the Garhshankar Assembly Constituency in Punjab, India. He was defeated by Jai Krishan Singh in the 2017 Punjab assembly elections and by Surinder Singh Bhulewal Rathan in 2012. He stood third in the 2017 elections.

Recently ahead of 2022 Punjab Legislative Assembly Election he joined PLC of former CM of Punjab Captain Amarinder Singh.

== Election results ==
=== 2017 ===
2017 Punjab Legislative Assembly election: 45. Garhshankar
Party	Candidate	Votes	%	±%
AAP	Jai Kishan Singh Rori	41,720	33.50	
SAD	Surinder Singh Heer	40070	32.18	
INC	Lov Kumar Goldy	31909	25.62	
BSP	Bakhsish Singh	6031	4.84	
CPI(M)	Harbhajan Singh	2217	1.78	
NOTA	None of the Above	1121	0.90	
Majority				
Turnout		125658		
Registered electors		169,609		
AAP gain from SAD		Swing		
