= Budh Ram =

Indian politician

Member of the Punjab Legislative Assembly
- Incumbent
- Assumed office 2022
- Constituency: Budhalada
- Majority: Aam Aadmi Party

Personal details
- Born: 1 January 1957 (age 69) Budhlada, Punjab
- Party: Aam Aadmi Party
- Spouse: Tej Kaur
- Children: 3 sons
- Parents: Late S. Bhag Singh (father); Late Nand Kaur (mother)
- Profession: Politician

Budh Ram Singh is an Indian politician and the MLA representing the Budhalada Assembly constituency in the Punjab Legislative Assembly. He is a member of the Aam Aadmi Party. He was elected as the MLA in the 2017 Punjab Legislative Assembly election and re elected in 2022 Punjab Legislative Assembly election. He was appointed acting president of the party in Punjab on 12 June 2023.

== Member of Legislative Assembly ==
He represents the Budhalada Assembly constituency as MLA in Punjab Assembly. The Aam Aadmi Party gained a strong 79% majority in the sixteenth Punjab Legislative Assembly by winning 92 out of 117 seats in the 2022 Punjab Legislative Assembly election. MP Bhagwant Mann was sworn in as Chief Minister on 16 March 2022.

Committee assignments of Punjab Legislative Assembly

- Chairman (2022–23) Committee on Public Undertakings

== Electoral performance ==
Punjab Assembly election, 2022: Budhlada
Party	Candidate	Votes	%	±%
AAP	Budh Ram	88,282	55.4	
SAD	Dr. Nishan Singh Hakamwala	36,591	22.9	
INC	Dr. Ranvir Kaur Mian	21,492	13.5	
Independent	Paramjeet Kaur	6,645	4.2	
NOTA	None of the above	935	0.5	
Majority		51,691	32.2	
Turnout		160,410	81.6	
Registered electors		196,474		
AAP hold				

State Legislative Assembly
Preceded by -	Member of the Punjab Legislative Assembly from Budhalada Assembly constituency 2017 –	Incumbent
