= Manjit Singh Bilaspur =

Indian politician

MLA, Punjab Legislative Assembly
- Incumbent
- Assumed office 2017
- Preceded by: Rajwinder Kaur
- Constituency: Nihal Singh Wala
- Majority: Aam Aadmi Party

Personal details
- Party: Aam Aadmi Party

Manjit Singh Bilaspur is an Indian politician and the MLA representing the Nihal Singh Wala Assembly constituency in the Punjab Legislative Assembly. He is a member of the Aam Aadmi Party. He was elected as the MLA in the 2022 Punjab Legislative Assembly election.

== Member of Legislative Assembly ==
He represents the Nihal Singh Wala Assembly constituency as MLA in Punjab Assembly. The Aam Aadmi Party gained a strong 79% majority in the sixteenth Punjab Legislative Assembly by winning 92 out of 117 seats in the 2022 Punjab Legislative Assembly election. MP Bhagwant Mann was sworn in as Chief Minister on 16 March 2022.

Committee assignments of Punjab Legislative Assembly

- Chairman (2022–23) Committee on Welfare of Scheduled Castes, Scheduled Tribes and Backward Classes

== Electoral performance ==
Punjab Assembly election, 2022: Nihal SinghWala
Party	Candidate	Votes	%	±%
AAP	Manjit Singh Bilaspur	65,156	46.40	
INC	Bhupendra singh Sahoke	27,172	19.4	
SAD	Baldev Singh Manuke	26,758	19.1	
SAD(A)	Baldev Singh	14,618	10.4	
NOTA	None of the Above	1,010	0.50	
Majority		37,984	26.88	
Registered electors		198,809		

State Legislative Assembly
Preceded by -	Member of the Punjab Legislative Assembly from Nihal Singh Wala Assembly constituency 2022 –	Incumbent
