= Jagsir Singh =

Indian politician

MLA, Punjab Legislative Assembly
- Incumbent
- Assumed office 2022
- Constituency: Bhucho Mandi
- Majority: Aam Aadmi Party

Personal details
- Party: Aam Aadmi Party

Jagsir Singh is an Indian politician and the MLA representing the Bhucho Mandi Assembly constituency in the Punjab Legislative Assembly. He is a member of the Aam Aadmi Party. He was elected as the MLA in the 2022 Punjab Legislative Assembly election.

== Member of Legislative Assembly ==
He represents the Bhucho Mandi Assembly constituency as MLA in Punjab Assembly. The Aam Aadmi Party gained a strong 79% majority in the sixteenth Punjab Legislative Assembly by winning 92 out of 117 seats in the 2022 Punjab Legislative Assembly election. MP Bhagwant Mann was sworn in as Chief Minister on 16 March 2022.

Committee assignments of Punjab Legislative Assembly

- Member (2022–23) Committee on Welfare of Scheduled Castes, Scheduled Tribes and Backward Classes
- Member (2022–23) Committee on Panchayati Raj Institutions

== Electoral performance ==
Punjab Assembly election, 2022: Bhucho Mandi
Party	Candidate	Votes	%	±%
AAP	Jagsir Singh	85,778	57.29	▲23.52
SAD	Darshan Singh Kotfatta	35,566	23.75	▼5.43
INC	Pritam Singh Kotbhai	20,681	13.81	▼20.39
Independent	Baldev Singh Aklia	2,546	1.7	▲1.43
BJP	Rupinderjit Singh	2,330	1.56	New
NOTA	None of the above	1,555	1.04%	▲0.57
Majority		50,212	33.54	▲33.11
Turnout		1,49,724	81.02	▼3.31
Registered electors		184,785		
AAP gain from INC		Swing		

State Legislative Assembly
Preceded by -	Member of the Punjab Legislative Assembly from Bhucho Mandi Assembly constituency 2022 –	Incumbent
