= Inder Iqbal Singh Atwal =

Indian politician

Member of the Legislative Assembly
- In office 2002–2007
- Governor: Jack Farj Rafael Jacob
- Preceded by: Charanjit Singh Atwal
- Constituency: Kum Kalan

Personal details
- Born: Atwal, Punjab, India
- Party: Bharatiya Janata Party
- Other political affiliations: Shiromani Akali Dal

Inder Iqbal Singh Atwal is an Indian politician and member of the Bharatiya Janata Party.

== Personal life ==
He was born to Charanjit Singh Atwal at Atwal, Amritsar, Punjab. He belongs to the Mazhabi Sikh community.

== Political career ==
Atwal was a member of the Punjab Legislative Assembly from Kum Kalan in Ludhiana district after winning 2002 Punjab Legislative Assembly election. He also unsuccessfully contested from the Raikot Assembly constituency. On passing of senior Congress leader and MP, Santokh Chaudhary, he unsuccessfully contested the by-election from the Jalandhar (SC) seat for Lok Sabha in 2023. He lost to AAP’s Sushil Kumar Rinku with a margin of 167,479 votes.

== Electoral performance ==
Punjab Legislative Assembly Election, 2002: Kum Kalan
Party	Candidate	Votes	%	±%
SAD	Inder Iqbal Singh Atwal	45,026	47.71	▼2.54
INC	Ishar Singh	42,420	44.95	▲9.49
BSP	Inderjit Singh Advocate	3,489	3.70	New entry
SAD(M)	Harjinder Kumar Jakhu	2,773	2.94	▼2.66
RLD	Gurmail Singh Uddowal	665	0.70	New entry
Majority		2,606	2.76	
Turnout		94,373	65.10	
Registered electors		144,962		
SAD hold		Swing		

Punjab Assembly election, 2007: Kum Kalan
Party	Candidate	Votes	%	±%
INC	Ishar Singh	55,082	48.73	▲3.78
SAD	Inder Iqbal Singh Atwal	53,017	46.91	▼1.10
LBP	Balwinder Singh Lalka	2,207	1.95	New entry
BSP	Gian Singh	1,934	1.71	▼1.99
LJP	Harjit Singh Bawa	788	0.70	New entry
Majority		2,065	1.83	
Turnout		113,028		
Registered electors				
INC gain from SAD		Swing		

Punjab Assembly election, 2017: Raikot
Party	Candidate	Votes	%	±%
AAP	Jagtar Singh Jagga Hissowal	48,245	41.21	New entry
INC	Dr. Amar Singh	37,631	32.15	▼13.74
SAD	Inder Iqbal Singh Atwal	29,019	24.80	▼17.49
BSP	Surinder Singh	878	0.75	▼1.26
NOTA	None of the above	816	0.70	
Majority		10,614	9.06	
Turnout		117,046	77.81	
Registered electors		150,418		
AAP gain from INC		Swing		

2023 Lok Sabha by-election: Jalandhar
Party	Candidate	Votes	%	±%
AAP	Sushil Kumar Rinku	302,279	34.05	▲31.55
INC	Karamjit Kaur Chaudhary	243,588	27.44	▼10.46
SAD	Dr.Sukhwinder Kumar Sukhi	158,445	17.85	▼18.05
BJP	Inder Iqbal Singh Atwal	134,800	15.18	New entry
SAD(A)	Gurjant Singh Kattu	20,366	2.29	New entry
NOTA	None of the Above	6,661	0.75	▼0.46
Majority		58,691	6.61	▲4.70
Turnout		887,626	54.70	▼8.34
AAP gain from INC		Swing		
