= Jaswinder Singh Brar =

Indian politician (1935–1993)

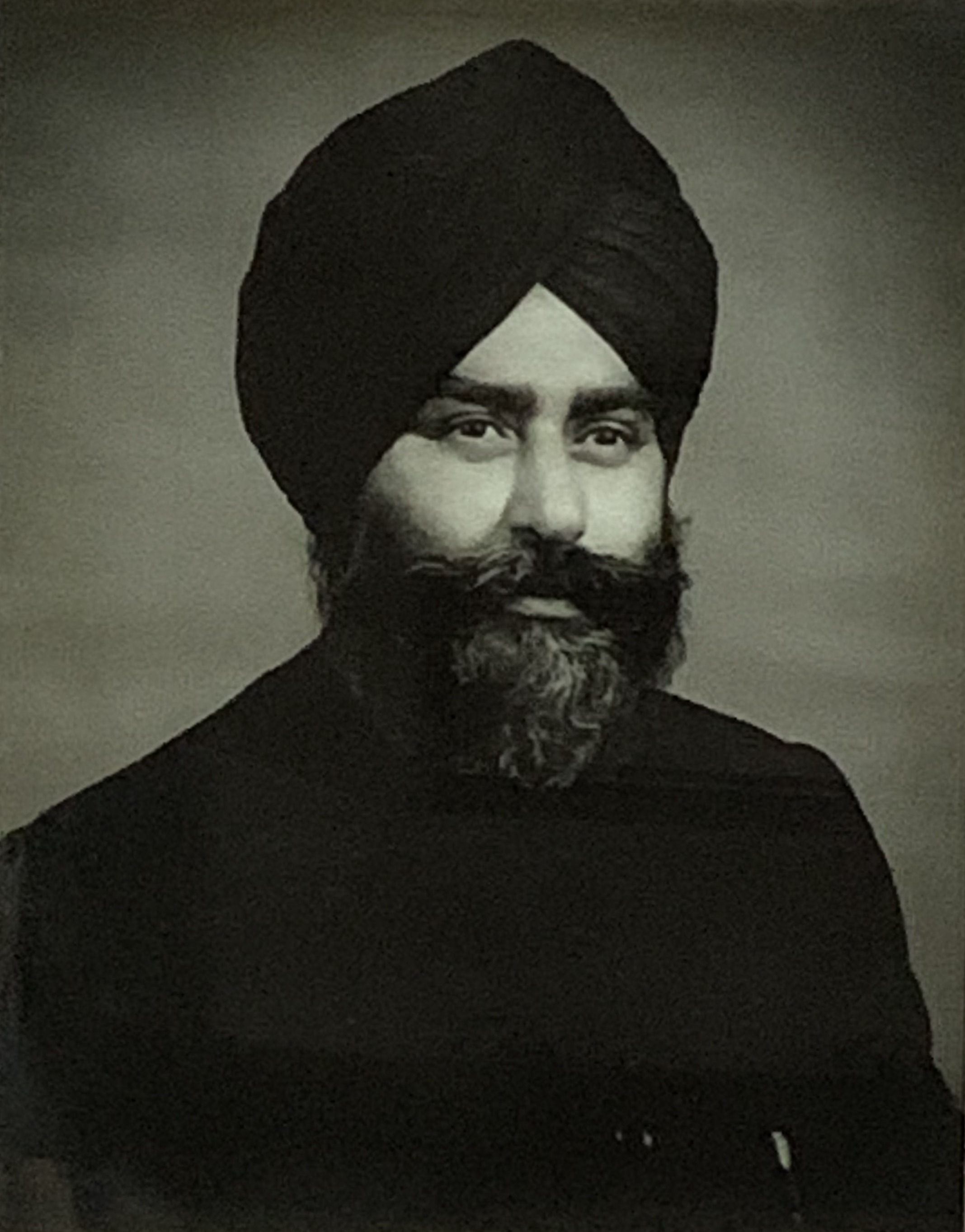

Minister of Cooperation,Government of Punjab
- In office 23 June 1977 – 12 February 1980
- Constituency: Kotkapura

Leader of opposition in Punjab Legislative Assembly
- In office 16 March 1972 – 2 October 1972
- Preceded by: Major Harinder Singh
- Succeeded by: Prakash Singh Badal

Member of Punjab Legislative Assembly
- In office 1972–1980
- Preceded by: Harcharan Singh Brar
- Succeeded by: Bhagwan Dass
- Constituency: Kotkapura

Personal details
- Born: 11 July 1935 Faridkot, British India (now Punjab, India)
- Died: 2 April 1993 (aged 57) Sandhwan, Faridkot, Punjab
- Party: Shiromani Akali Dal
- Spouse: Manjit Kaur
- Children: Mantar Singh Brar; Kultar Singh Brar; Balkar Singh Brar; Paramjit Kaur; Sarabjit Kaur
- Parent(s): S. Karnail Singh; Sdn. Har Kaur

Jaswinder Singh Brar (11 July 1935 – 2 April 1993) was an Indian politician and was Cabinet minister of Punjab in Prakash Singh Badal ministry (1977–80).

Jaswinder Singh Brar was a Punjabi politician who became a member of the Punjab Legislative Assembly twice by winning an assembly election in 1972 and then in 1977 from Kotkapura Assembly Constituency on the ticket of Shiromani Akali Dal. In 1972 he became the Leader of opposition but due to differences with high command he resigned and was succeeded by Prakash Singh Badal.

In 1977 when Shiromani Akali Dal formed the government in Punjab he became the Minister of Cooperation and held the position until President's rule was declared in Punjab.

He also remained the President of All India Sikh Students Federation.

Brar died on 2 April 1993, at the age of 57.
