= 6th World Punjabi Conference =

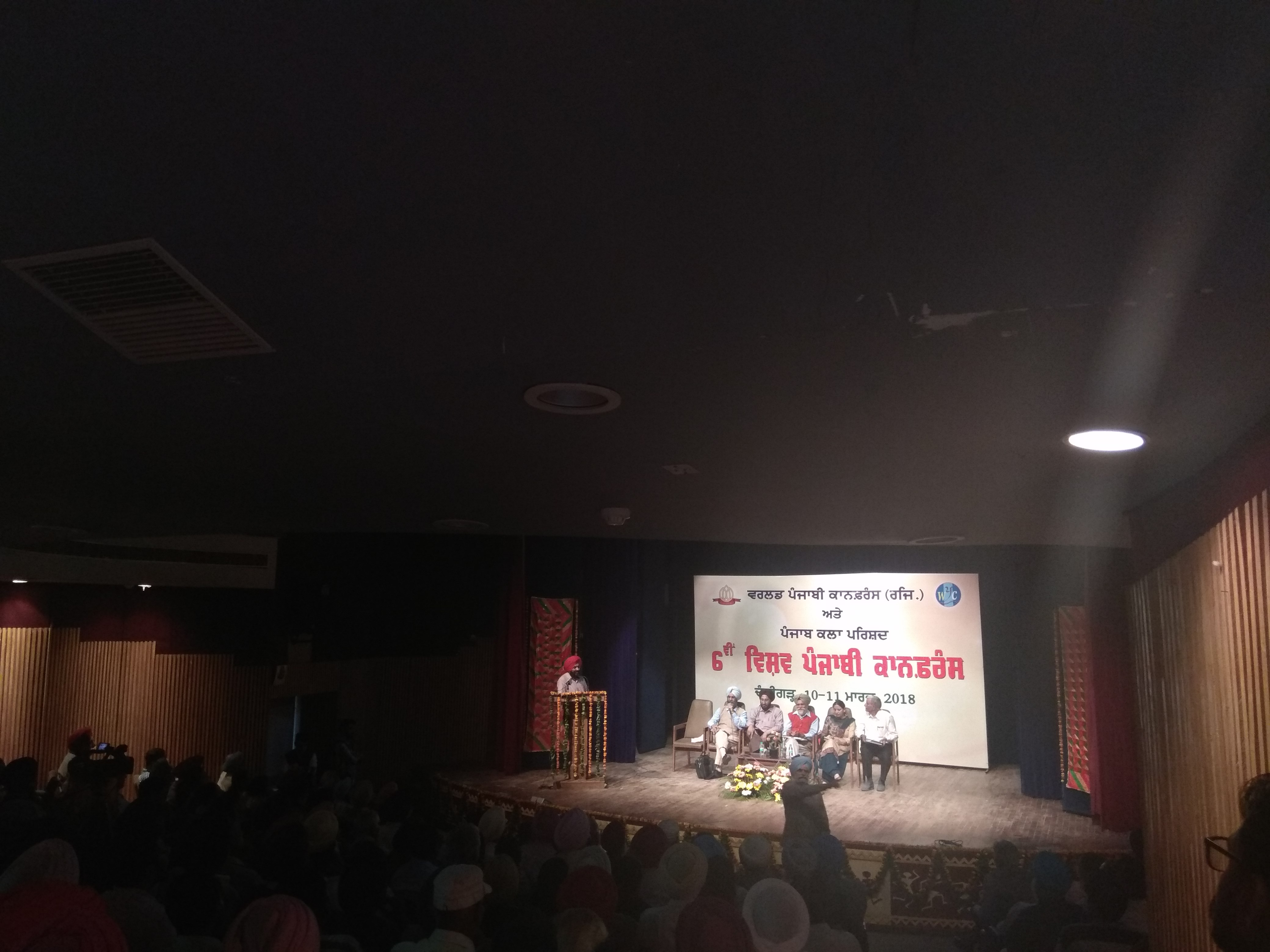
Dr. Ravel Singh addressing the delegates at 6th World Punjabi Conference

6th World Punjabi Conference is a two-day panel discussion based conference regarding Punjab's education, language, literature, agriculture, security and politics. It is held in Chandigarh on 10–11 March 2018 and inaugurated Rana KP Singh, Speaker Punjab Vidhan Sabha and Navjot Singh Sidhu, Cultural Affairs and Tourism Minister with emphasis on the development of Punjabi language and society. Others who spoke were Punjabi University, Patiala's vice-chancellor BS Ghuman; Namdhari Satguru Uday Singh and former director, World Punjabi Centre, Deepak Manmohan Singh. Anita Singh, Jang Bahadur Goyal, Sukhi Bath, and Iqbal Mahal were honoured for their contribution to Punjabi language and culture. On Sunday, the conference shifts to Punjab Kala Bhawan.
