= Manwinder Singh =

Indian politician

MLA, Punjab Legislative Assembly
- Incumbent
- Assumed office 2022
- Preceded by: Lakhvir Singh Lakha
- Constituency: Payal
- Majority: Aam Aadmi Party

Personal details
- Party: Aam Aadmi Party

Manwinder Singh Giaspura is an Indian politician and the MLA representing the Payal Assembly constituency in the Punjab Legislative Assembly. He is a member of the Aam Aadmi Party. He was elected as the MLA in the 2022 Punjab Legislative Assembly election.

== Career ==
Giaspura has been whistle blower in unearthing 1984 Hondh-Chillar massacre in Haryana.

== Member of Legislative Assembly ==
He represents the Payal Assembly constituency as MLA in Punjab Assembly. The Aam Aadmi Party gained a strong 79% majority in the sixteenth Punjab Legislative Assembly by winning 92 out of 117 seats in the 2022 Punjab Legislative Assembly election. MP Bhagwant Mann was sworn in as Chief Minister on 16 March 2022.

Committee assignments of Punjab Legislative Assembly

- Member (2022–23) Committee on Public Undertakings
- Member (2022–23) Committee on Panchayati Raj Institutions

== Electoral performance ==
2022 Punjab Legislative Assembly election: Payal
Party	Candidate	Votes	%	±%
AAP	Manwinder Singh Gyaspura	63,633	50.4	
INC	Lakhvir Singh	30,624	24.3	
BSP	Dr. Jaspreet Singh Bija	20,648	16.4	
Majority		33,009	26.03	
Registered electors		166,299		

State Legislative Assembly
Preceded by -	Member of the Punjab Legislative Assembly from Payal Assembly constituency 2022 –	Incumbent
