= Rupinder Singh =

Indian politician

MLA, Punjab Legislative Assembly
- Incumbent
- Assumed office 2022
- Constituency: Bassi Pathana
- Majority: Aam Aadmi Party

Personal details
- Party: Aam Aadmi Party

Rupinder Singh Happy is an Indian politician and the MLA representing the Bassi Pathana Assembly constituency in the Punjab Legislative Assembly. He is a member of the Aam Aadmi Party. He was elected as the MLA in the 2022 Punjab Legislative Assembly election.

== Member of Legislative Assembly ==
He represents the Bassi Pathana Assembly constituency as MLA in Punjab Assembly. The Aam Aadmi Party gained a strong 79% majority in the sixteenth Punjab Legislative Assembly by winning 92 out of 117 seats in the 2022 Punjab Legislative Assembly election. MP Bhagwant Mann was sworn in as Chief Minister on 16 March 2022.

Committee assignments of Punjab Legislative Assembly

- Member (2022–23) Committee on Welfare of Scheduled Castes, Scheduled Tribes and Backward Classes
- Member (2022–23) Committee on Co-operation and its allied activities

== Electoral performance ==
Punjab Assembly election, 2022: Bassi Pathana
Party	Candidate	Votes	%	±%
AAP	Rupinder Singh Happy	54,018	48.17	
INC	Gurpreet Singh GP	16,177	14.43	
Independent	Manohar Singh	13,796	12.3	
SAD(A)	Dharam Singh	10,899	9.72	
BSP	Shiv Kumar Kalyan	7,859	7.01	
PLC	Deepak Jyoti	1,647	1.47	
NOTA	None of the above	792	0.71	
Majority		37,841	33.74	
Turnout				
Registered electors		149,248		

State Legislative Assembly
Preceded by -	Member of the Punjab Legislative Assembly from Bassi Pathana Assembly constituency 2022 –	Incumbent
