= Jai Krishan Singh =

Indian politician (born 1983)

Jai Krishan Singh Rouri

25th Deputy Speaker of Punjab Assembly
- Incumbent
- Assumed office 30 June 2022
- Speaker: Kultar Singh Sandhwan
- Preceded by: Ajaib Singh Bhatti
- Chief Minister: Bhagwant Maan

Member of the Punjab Legislative Assembly for Garhshankar Assembly constituency
- In office 11 March 2017 – Incumbent
- Preceded by: Surinder Singh Bhulewal Rathan
- Majority: Aam Aadmi Party

Personal details
- Born: 13 January 1983 (age 43) Garhshankar, Punjab, India
- Party: Aam Aadmi Party
- Children: 2
- Occupation: Politician, agriculture, photographer
- Website: Members

Jai Krishan Singh Rouri is 25th Deputy Speaker of Punjab Assembly. He is second term MLA in the Punjab Legislative Assembly representing the Garhshankar Assembly constituency in Punjab, India, serving since 2017. He is a member of the Aam Aadmi Party. He won a second consecutive term in the 2022 Punjab Legislative Assembly election by margin of 4179 votes.

== Early life ==
He worked as a farmer and a wedding photographer in Garhshankar.

== Political career ==
He contested the 2017 Punjab Assembly elections on the Aam Aadmi Party ticket and defeated Surinder Singh Bhulewal Rathan of Shiromani Akali Dal. In 2022 he won in multi cornered election by a margin of more than 4000 votes. On 30 June 2022 he was elected as Deputy Speaker of Punjab Vidhan Sabha.

== Member of Legislative Assembly ==
He represents the Garhshankar Assembly constituency as MLA in Punjab Legislative Assembly since 2017. He was re-elected for a second term in 2022. The Aam Aadmi Party gained a strong 79% majority in the sixteenth Punjab Legislative Assembly by winning 92 out of 117 seats in the 2022 Punjab Legislative Assembly election. MP Bhagwant Mann was sworn in as Chief Minister on 16 March 2022.

On 30 June 2022, he was unanimously elected as the Deputy speaker in the 16th Punjab Assembly. AAP member Baljinder Kaur had proposed his name.

Committee assignments of Punjab Legislative Assembly

- Chairman (2022–23) House Committee (Note: Deputy speaker (Ex-Officio Chairman))
- Member (2022–23) Committee on Public Accounts
- Member (2022–23) Committee on Estimates
- Member (2022–23) Committee on Public Undertakings

== Electoral performance ==
Punjab Assembly election, 2017: Garhshankar
Party	Candidate	Votes	%	±%
AAP	Jai Kishan Singh Rori	41,720	33.50	
SAD	Surinder Singh Heer	40,070	32.18	
INC	Lov Kumar Goldy	31,909	25.62	
BSP	Bakhsish Singh	6,031	4.84	
CPI(M)	Harbhajan Singh	2,217	1.78	
NOTA	None of the above	1,121	0.90	
Majority				
Turnout		125,658		
Registered electors		169,609		
AAP gain from SAD		Swing		
