= Surinder Singh Bhulewal Rathan =

Indian politician

- Preceded by: Luv Kumar Goldy

Surinder Singh Bhulewal Rathan is an Indian politician from the state of Punjab. Rathan was a member of the Punjab Legislative Assembly from 2012 to 2017 representing Garhshankar Assembly Constituency . He was defeated by Jai Krishan Singh.

== Election results ==
=== 2017 ===
2017 Punjab Legislative Assembly election: 45. Garhshankar
Party	Candidate	Votes	%	±%
AAP	Jai Kishan Singh Rori	41,720	33.50	
SAD	Surinder Singh Heer	40070	32.18	
INC	Lov Kumar Goldy	31909	25.62	
BSP	Bakhsish Singh	6031	4.84	
CPI(M)	Harbhajan Singh	2217	1.78	
NOTA	None of the Above	1121	0.90	
Majority				
Turnout		125658		
Registered electors		169,609		
AAP gain from SAD		Swing		
