= Payal Assembly constituency =

Legislative Assembly constituency in Punjab State, India

Coordinates: 30.72°N 76.06°E

Payal
- Constituency No. 67 for the Punjab Legislative Assembly

Constituency details
- Country: India
- State: Punjab
- District: Ludhiana
- Lok Sabha constituency: Fatehgarh Sahib
- Total electors: 166,299
- Reservation: SC

Member of Legislative Assembly
- 16th Punjab Legislative Assembly
- Incumbent Manwinder Singh Gyaspura
- Party: Aam Aadmi Party
- Elected year: 2022

Payal is one of the 117 Legislative Assembly constituencies of Punjab state in India. It was once represented by Beant Singh, who was a former Chief Minister.

It is in Ludhiana district and is a segment of the Fatehgarh Sahib (Lok Sabha constituency).

== Members of the Legislative Assembly ==
Most successful parties from Payal Vidhan Sabha
1. INC (7 Times) (53.8%)
2. SAD (3 Times) (23.1%)
3. AAP (1 Time) (7.69%)
4. IND (1 Time) (7.69%)
5. INC (I) (1 Time) (7.69%)

Year	Member	Party
1967	G. Singh	Indian National Congress
1969	Beant Singh	Independent
1972	Beant Singh	Indian National Congress
1977	Beant Singh	Indian National Congress
1980	Beant Singh	Indian National Congress (Indira)
1985	Davinder Singh	Shiromani Akali Dal
1992	Harnek Singh	Indian National Congress
1997	Sadhu Singh	Shiromani Akali Dal
2002	Tej Parkash Singh	Indian National Congress
2007	Tej Parkash Singh	Indian National Congress
2012	Charanjit Singh Atwal	Shiromani Akali Dal
2017	Lakhvir Singh Lakha	Indian National Congress
2022	Manwinder Singh Gyaspura	Aam Aadmi Party

== Election results ==
=== 2027 ===
Punjab Assembly election, 2027: Payal
Party	Candidate	Votes	%	±%
AAP	Manwinder Singh Gyaspura			
AD (WPD)				New entry
INC				
BSP				
SAD				New entry
BJP				New entry
NOTA	None of the above			
Majority				
Turnout				

=== 2022 ===
2022 Punjab Legislative Assembly election: Payal
Party	Candidate	Votes	%	±%
AAP	Manwinder Singh Gyaspura	63,633	50.4	
INC	Lakhvir Singh	30,624	24.3	
SAD(A)	Rampal Singh Daulatpur	5683	4.5	
BSP	Dr. Jaspreet Singh Bija	20,648	16.4	
SAD(S)	Harshit Kumar Sheetal	682	0.54	
Majority		33,009	26.03	
Registered electors		166,299		

=== 2017 ===
Punjab Assembly election, 2017: Payal
Party	Candidate	Votes	%	±%
INC	Lakhvir Singh Lakha	57,776	44.19	
AAP	Gurpreet Singh Lapran	36280	27.74	
SAD	Isher Singh Meharban	33044	25.27	
SAD(A)	Gurvinder Singh	18314	14.5	
BSP	Dalbara Singh	618	.47	
DEMSWP	Advocate Inderjit Singh	402	.30	{{{change}}}
Independent	Karan Kangra	363	.27	
Apna Punjab Party	Captain Rampal Singh	347	.26	{{{change}}}
AITC	Sandeep Kumar	328	.25	
Independent	Jagtar Singh	227	.17	
Independent	Samsher Singh	186	.14	
NCP	Kulwant Singh Cheema	186	.14	
Independent	Prem Singh	156	.12	
Majority		21496	16.44	
Turnout		130744	81.90	
Registered electors		159,662		
INC hold		Swing		
