= Anandpur Sahib Assembly constituency =

Legislative Assembly constituency in Punjab State, India

Coordinates: 31.24°N 76.5°E

Anandpur Sahib
- Constituency No. 49 for the Punjab Legislative Assembly

Constituency details
- Country: India
- State: Punjab
- District: Rupnagar
- Lok Sabha constituency: Anandpur Sahib
- Total electors: 191,727 (in 2022)
- Reservation: None

Member of Legislative Assembly
- 16th Punjab Legislative Assembly
- Incumbent Harjot Singh Bains
- Party: Aam Aadmi Party
- Elected year: 2022

Anandpur Sahib Assembly constituency (Sl. No.: 49) is a Punjab Legislative Assembly constituency in Rupnagar district, Punjab state, India.

== Members of the Legislative Assembly ==
Most successful parties from Anandpur Sahib Vidhan Sabha
1. INC (8 Times) (50.0%)
2. SAD (2 Times) (12.5%)
3. BJP (2 Times) (12.5%)
4. AAP (1 Time) (6.25%)
5. AIFB (1 Time) (6.25%)
6. JP (1 Time) (6.25%)
7. INC (I) (1 Time) (6.25%)

Year	Member	Party
Nangal constituency
1951	Rai Bahadur Hari Chand	All India Forward Bloc
1957	Baloo Ram	Indian National Congress
1962	Baloo Ram	Indian National Congress
1967	J. Singh	Indian National Congress
1969	Sadhu Singh	Indian National Congress
1972	Zail Singh	Indian National Congress
1977	Madho Singh	Janata Party
1980	Basant Singh	Indian National Congress (Indira)
1985	Tara Singh	Shiromani Akali Dal
1992	Ramesh Dutt	Bharatiya Janata Party
1997	Tara Singh	Shiromani Akali Dal
2002	Kanwar Pal Singh	Indian National Congress
2007	Kanwar Pal Singh	Indian National Congress
Anandpur Sahib constituency
2012	Madan Mohan Mittal	Bharatiya Janata Party
2017	Kanwar Pal Singh	Indian National Congress
2022	Harjot Singh Bains	Aam Aadmi Party

== Election results ==
=== 2027 ===
Punjab Assembly election, 2027: Anandpur Sahib
Party	Candidate	Votes	%	±%
AAP				
AD (WPD)				New entry
INC				
BSP				
SAD				New entry
BJP				
NOTA	None of the above			
Majority				
Turnout				

=== 2022 ===
Punjab Assembly election, 2022: Anandpur Sahib
Party	Candidate	Votes	%	±%
AAP	Harjot Singh Bains	82,132	57.92	
INC	Kanwar Pal Singh	36,352	25.63	
BJP	Parminder Sharma	11,433	8.06	
BSP	Nutan Kumar	5,923	4.18	
SAD(A)	Ranjit Singh	1,459	1.03	
NOTA	None of the above	1290	0.91	
Majority		45,780	32.29	
Turnout		141809		
Registered electors		193,750		
AAP gain from INC				

=== 2017 ===
Punjab Assembly election, 2017: Anandpur Sahib
Party	Candidate	Votes	%	±%
INC	Kanwar Pal Singh	60,800	45.01	
BJP	Parminder Sharma	36,919	27.33	
AAP	Sanjeev Gautam	30,304	22.43	
Independent	Nutan Kumar	2,092	1.55	
BSP	Gurcharan Singh Khalsa	1,442	1.07	
CPI(M)	Mohinder Singh	1,026	0.76	
Independent	Pritam Singh Bharatgarh	602	0.45	
PDP	Subhash Chander Sharma	518	0.38	
SAD(A)	Harbhjn Singh	517	0.38	
NOTA	None of the above	858	0.64	
Majority		23,881	32.29	
Registered electors		180,222		
INC gain from BJP				

=== Previous results ===
Year	A C No.	Name	Party	Votes	Runner Up	Party	Votes
2012	49	Madan Mohan Mittal	BJP	62600	Kanwar Pal Singh	INC	54714
2007	65	Sant Ajit Singh	SAD	47810	Ramesh Dutt Sharma	INC	37912
2002	66	Ramesh Dutt Sharma	INC	41950	Tara Singh	SAD	29268
1997	66	Tara Singh	SAD	37878	Ramesh Dutt Sharma	INC	31834
1992	66	Ramesh Dutt	BJP	11699	Basant Singh	INC	8232
1985	66	Tara Singh	SAD	20638	Gurvir Singh	INC	19708
1980	66	Basant Singh	INC(I)	23280	Ajit Singh	SAD	19695
1977	66	Madho Singh	JNP	15987	Shiv Singh	INC	11987
1972	73	Zail Singh	INC	22389	Rajinder Singh	IND	19133
1970	73 (By Polls)	Zail Singh	NCJ	21747	Sadhu Singh	SAD	20552
1969	73	Sadhu Singh	INC	14814	Shiv Singh	IND	11690
1967	73	J. Singh	INC	12016	Sadhu Singh	ADS	9768
1962	140	Baloo Ram	INC	25987	Sucha Singh	IND	12988
1957	83	Balloo Ram	INC	20836	Karam Chand	IND	17378
1952	(By Polls)	Mohan Lal	INC	26667	B. Chand	IND	13374
1951	57	Hari Chand	FBL(MG)	10896	Mohan Lal	INC	10085
