= Budhalada Assembly constituency =

Legislative Assembly constituency in Punjab State, India

Coordinates: 29.93°N 75.55°E

Budhlada
- Constituency No. 98 for the Punjab Legislative Assembly

Constituency details
- Country: India
- State: Punjab
- District: Mansa
- Lok Sabha constituency: Bathinda
- Total electors: 195,170 (in 2022)
- Reservation: SC

Member of Legislative Assembly
- 16th Punjab Legislative Assembly
- Incumbent Budh Ram
- Party: Aam Aadmi Party
- Elected year: 2017

Budhlada is a Punjab Legislative Assembly constituency in Mansa district, Punjab state, India.

== Members of the Legislative Assembly ==
Most successful parties from Budhlada Vidhan Sabha
1. SAD (8 Times) (47.1%)
2. INC (4 Times) (23.5%)
3. CPI (3 Times) (17.6%)
4. AAP (2 Times) (11.8%)

| Year | Member | Party |
|---|---|---|
As part of PEPSU Legislative Assembly (1951–56)
"Budhlada Bareta constituency"
| 1952 | Des Raj | Indian National Congress |
"Budhlada constituency"
| 1954 | Narotam Singh | Shiromani Akali Dal |
| 1954 | Dharam Singh | Communist Party of India |
Constituency defunct (1956-1962)
As part of Punjab Legislative Assembly (1962–Present)
| 1962 | Tej Singh | Shiromani Akali Dal |
| 1967 | G. Singh | Indian National Congress |
| 1969 | Parshotam Singh | Shiromani Akali Dal |
| 1972 | Gurdev Singh | Indian National Congress |
| 1977 | Tara Singh | Shiromani Akali Dal |
| 1980 | Parshotam Singh | Shiromani Akali Dal |
| 1985 | Parshotam Singh | Shiromani Akali Dal |
| 1992 | Hardev Singh | Communist Party of India |
| 1997 | Hardev Singh | Communist Party of India |
| 2002 | Harbant Singh | Shiromani Akali Dal |
| 2007 | Mangat Rai Bansal | Indian National Congress |
| 2012 | Chatin Singh | Shiromani Akali Dal |
| 2017 | Budh Ram | Aam Aadmi Party |
| 2022 | Budh Ram | Aam Aadmi Party |

== Election results ==
=== 2027 ===
Punjab Assembly election, 2027: Budhlada
| Party | Candidate | Votes | % | ±% |
|---|---|---|---|---|
| AAP | | | | |
| AD (WPD) | | | | New entry |
| INC | | | | |
| BSP | | | | |
| SAD | | | | |
| BJP | | | | New entry |
| NOTA | None of the above | | | |
| Majority | | | | |
| Turnout | | | | |

=== 2022 ===
Punjab Assembly election, 2022: Budhlada
| Party | Candidate | Votes | % | ±% |
|---|---|---|---|---|
| AAP | Budh Ram | 88,282 | 55.4 | |
| SAD | Dr. Nishan Singh Hakamwala | 36,591 | 22.9 | |
| INC | Dr. Ranvir Kaur Mian | 21,492 | 13.5 | |
| Independent | Paramjeet Kaur | 6,645 | 4.2 | |
| NOTA | None of the above | 935 | 0.5 | |
| Majority | | 51,691 | 32.2 | |
| Turnout | | 160,410 | 81.6 | |
| Registered electors | | 196,474 | | |
| AAP hold | | | | |

=== 2017 ===
Punjab Assembly election, 2017: Budhlada
| Party | Candidate | Votes | % | ±% |
|---|---|---|---|---|
| AAP | Budh Ram | 52,265 | 32.21 | |
| INC | Ranjit Kaur Bhatti | 50989 | 31.43 | |
| SAD | Nishan Singh | 50477 | 31.11 | |
| CPI | Krishan Singh | 1986 | 1.22 | |
| CPI(ML)L | Bhagwant Singh Samao | 1601 | 0.99 | |
| SAD(A) | Ranjit Singh | 1383 | 0.85 | |
| BSP | Sher Singh | 1074 | 0.66 | |
| Independent | Kala Singh | 651 | 0.4 | |
| APP | Kirpal Singh | 549 | 0.34 | |
| AITC | Lachhman Singh | 491 | 0.3 | |
| NOTA | None of the above | 778 | 0.48 | |
| Registered electors | | 185,227 | | |
| AAP gain from SAD | | Swing | | |

=== 2012 ===
Punjab Assembly election, 2012: Assembly constituency No. 98
| Party | Candidate | Votes | % | ±% |
|---|---|---|---|---|
| SAD | Chatin Singh | 51,504 | | |
| INC | Satpal Singh | 45,056 | | |

=== 2007 ===
Punjab Assembly election, 2007: Assembly constituency No. 115
| Party | Candidate | Votes | % | ±% |
|---|---|---|---|---|
| INC | Mangat Rai Bansal | 56,271 | | |
| SAD | Harbant Singh | 43,456 | | |

=== 2002 ===
2002 Punjab Legislative Assembly election: Assembly constituency No. 116
| Party | Candidate | Votes | % | ±% |
|---|---|---|---|---|
| SAD | Harbant Singh | 44,184 | | |
| CPI | Hardev Singh Arshi | 29,384 | | |

=== Results from 20th century ===
| Year | A.C. No. | MLA Name | Party | Votes | Runner Up | Party | Votes |
|---|---|---|---|---|---|---|---|
| 1997 | 116 | Hardev Singh Arshi | CPI | 47,469 | Harbant Singh | SAD | 41,020 |
| 1992 | 116 | Hardev Singh Arshi | CPI | 9,034 | Gurdev Singh | INC | 6,455 |
| 1985 | 116 | Parshotam Singh | SAD | 25,484 | Bogh Singh | INC | 18,551 |
| 1980 | 116 | Parshotam Singh | SAD | 27,022 | Gurdev Singh | INC (I) | 24,997 |
| 1977 | 116 | Tara Singh | SAD | 21,933 | Gurdev Singh | INC | 20,477 |
| 1972 | 96 | Gurdev Singh | INC | 15,926 | Gopal Singh | SAD | 18,944 |
| 1969 | 96 | Parshotam Singh | SAD | 19,607 | Gurdev Singh | INC | 17,736 |
| 1967 | 96 | Gurdev Singh | INC | 19,621 | Tej Singh | ADS | 16,977 |
| 1962 | 72 | Tej Singh | AD | 16,951 | Atma Singh | INC | 13,225 |
