= Kotkapura Assembly constituency =

Legislative Assembly constituency in Punjab State, India

Coordinates: 30.58°N 74.81°E

Kotkapura
- Constituency No. 88 for the Punjab Legislative Assembly

Constituency details
- Country: India
- State: Punjab
- District: Faridkot
- Lok Sabha constituency: Faridkot
- Total electors: 159,646
- Reservation: None

Member of Legislative Assembly
- 16th Punjab Legislative Assembly
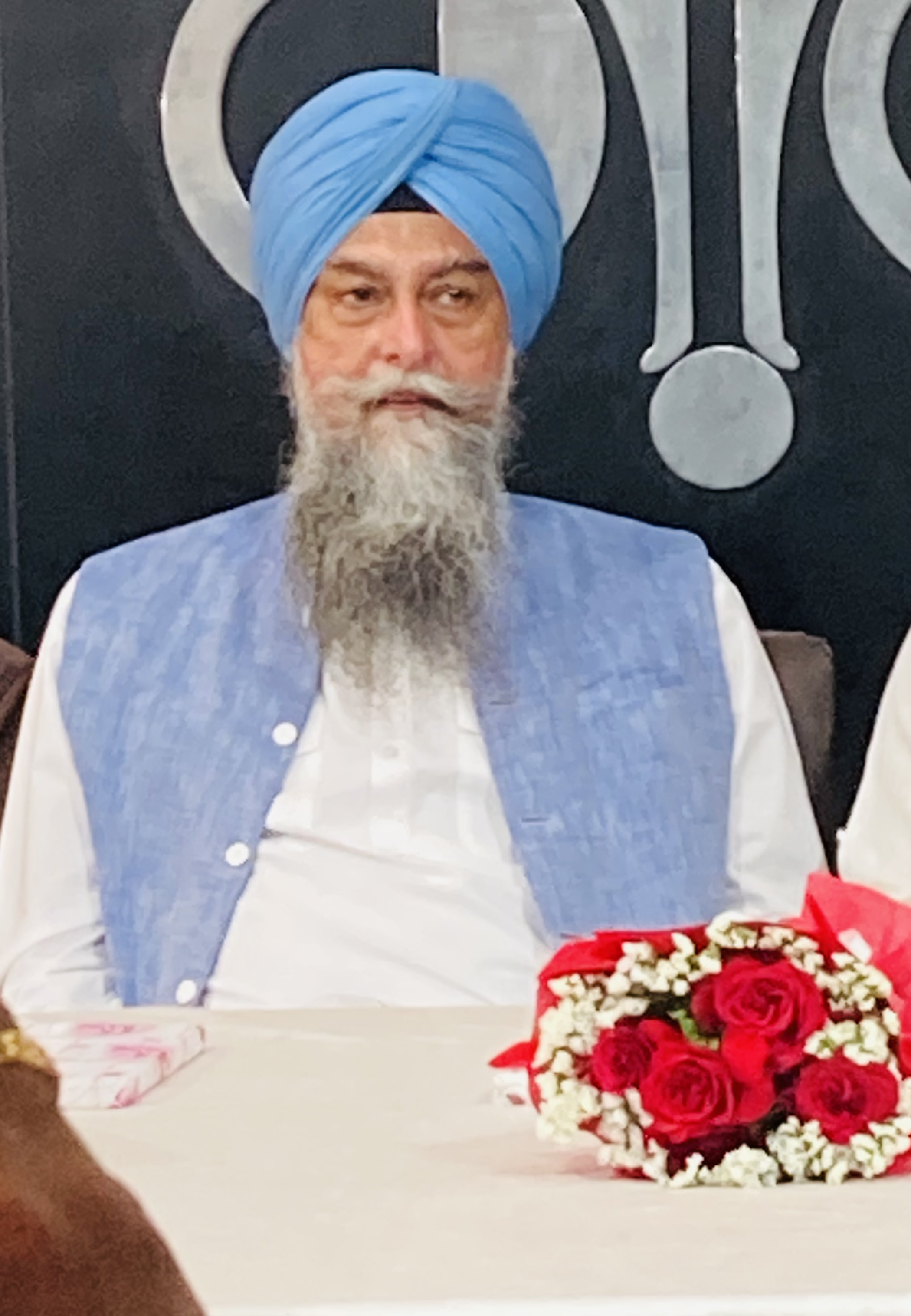
- Incumbent Kultar Singh Sandhwan; 18th Speaker of the Punjab Legislative Assembly
- Party: AAP
- Alliance: I.N.D.I.A.
- Elected year: 2022
- Preceded by: Mantar Singh Brar; SAD

Kotkapura Assembly constituency also known as Kot Kapura Assembly constituency is one of the 117 Legislative Assembly constituencies of Punjab state in India. It is part of Faridkot district.

== Members of the Legislative Assembly ==
Most successful parties from Kotkapura Vidhan Sabha
1. SAD (6 Times) (37.5%)
2. INC (5 Times) (31.2%)
3. AAP (2 Times) (12.5%)
4. AD – SFS (1 Time) (6.25%)
5. IND (1 Time) (6.25%)
6. INC (I) (1 Time) (6.25%)

=== Patiala and East Punjab States Union ===
Year	Member	Party
Kot Kapura Jaitu Assembly constituency
1951 (Two member Constituency)	Ranjit Singh	Indian National Congress
1951 (Two member Constituency)	Manjit Inder Singh	Independent
Kot Kapura Assembly constituency (SC)
1954	Kanwar Manjit Inder Singh	Indian National Congress

Constituency didn't exist (1956–67)

=== Punjab ===
Year	Member	Party
1967	H. Singh	Akali Dal – Sant Fateh Singh Group
1969	Harcharan Singh	Indian National Congress
1972	Jaswinder Singh	Shiromani Akali Dal
1977	Jaswinder Singh	Shiromani Akali Dal
1980	Bhagwan Dass	Indian National Congress (Indira)
1985	Mohinder Singh Brar	Shiromani Akali Dal
1992	Upinder Kumar	Indian National Congress
1997	Mantar Singh Brar	Shiromani Akali Dal
2002	Mantar Singh Brar	Shiromani Akali Dal
2007	Ripjit Singh	Indian National Congress
2012	Mantar Singh Brar	Shiromani Akali Dal
2017	Kultar Singh Sandhwan	Aam Aadmi Party
2022	Kultar Singh Sandhwan	Aam Aadmi Party

== Election results ==
=== 2027 ===
Punjab Assembly election, 2027: Kotkapura
Party	Candidate	Votes	%	±%
AAP	Kultar Singh Sandhwan			
AD (WPD)				New entry
INC				
BSP				
SAD				
BJP				New entry
NOTA	None of the above			
Majority				
Turnout				

=== 2022 ===
Punjab Assembly election, 2022: Kotkapura
Party	Candidate	Votes	%	±%
AAP	Kultar Singh Sandhwan	54,009	43.81	
INC	Ajaypal Singh Sandhu	32,879	26.67	
SAD	Mantar Singh Brar	29,576	24.2	
SAD(A)	Jaskaran Singh Kahan Singh Wala	2,606	2.1	
PLC	Dargesh Kumar	1,045	0.9	
NOTA	None of the above	889	0.6	
Majority		21,130	17.14	
Turnout		123,267	76.93	
Registered electors		160,216		
AAP hold				

=== 2017 ===
Punjab Assembly election, 2017: Kotkapura
Party	Candidate	Votes	%	±%
AAP	Kultar Singh Sandhwan	47,401	38.8	
INC	Bhai Harnirpal Singh Kukku	37,326	30.5	
SAD	Mantar Singh Brar	33,895	27.7	
NOTA	None of the above	674	0.4	
Majority		10,075	8.3	
Turnout		121,629	80.5	
Registered electors		151,950		

== See also ==
- List of constituencies of the Punjab Legislative Assembly
- Faridkot district
