= Charanjit Singh Atwal =

Indian politician

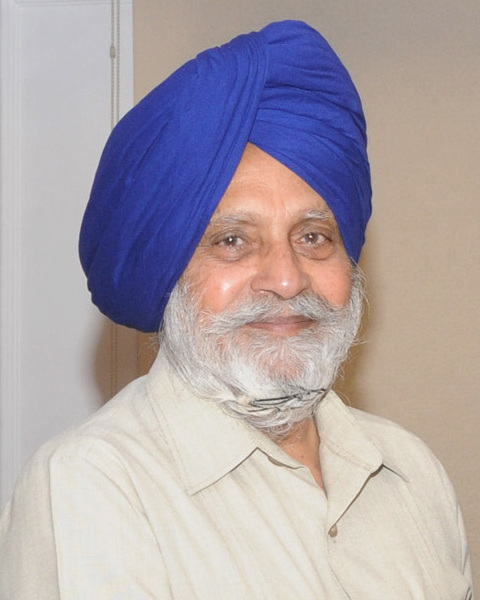

13th Deputy Speaker of Lok Sabha
- In office 9 June 2004 – 18 May 2009
- Speaker: Somnath Chatterjee
- Preceded by: P.M. Sayeed
- Succeeded by: Karia Munda

Speaker of Punjab assembly
- In office 4 March 1997 – 20 March 2002
- Preceded by: Dilbagh Singh Daleke
- Succeeded by: Kewal Krishan
- In office 20 March 2012 – 27 March 2017
- Preceded by: Nirmal Singh Kahlon
- Succeeded by: Rana K. P. Singh

Personal details
- Born: 15 March 1937 (age 89) Montgomery, Punjab, British India
- Party: Bharatiya Janata Party
- Other political affiliations: Shiromani Akali Dal
- Children: Inder Iqbal Singh Atwal
- Website: charanjitsinghatwal.in
- As of 22 September, 2006

Charanjit Singh Atwal (born 15 March 1937) is an Indian politician who was Deputy Speaker of the 14th Lok Sabha of India from 2004 to 2009. He represented the Phillaur constituency of Punjab in the 14th Lok Sabha and is a member of the Bharatiya Janata Party (BJP) political party.

He was Speaker of the Punjab Legislative Assembly from 1997 to 2002 and again from 2012 to 2017.

== Early life ==
Charanjit Singh Atwal was born to a Mazhabi Sikh family in Montgomery, Punjab Province, British India (Punjab in Pakistan after partition in 1947). Sardar Atwal's family, like many Punjabis migrated to Indian Punjab as refugees when they found themselves living on the wrong side of the border. He graduated from GGN Khalsa College, Ludhiana and then obtained his LLB degree from Panjab University, Chandigarh.

== Political life ==
Charanjit Singh Atwal was a member of the Lok Sabha from 1985 to 1989. He was then Speaker of the Punjab Assembly from 1997 to 2002. He is a respected member of the Indian Parliament for 20 years and has over 40 years of service in politics. He has been in the field of politics since 1957 and was elected to the Punjab State Assembly in 1977. He is considered among the top hierarchy of the Shiromani Akali Dal. In the 2001 election Sardar Atwal stood in the Phillaur constituency (SC) and crushed his political rival Santosh Chowdhury of the Indian National Congress by a huge margin of 98,884 votes. Santosh Chowdhury was the previous 1999 election winner, winning by what was then a large margin of 26,573 votes.

From 1997 to 2000 he was Chairman of the Committee on Welfare of Scheduled Castes, Scheduled Tribes and Backward Classes. He was jailed during the 1975-77 emergency.

He has served as Speaker of Punjab Legislative Assembly for a second time since 2012.

== Personal life ==
Sardar Charanjit.S.Atwal is married to Inderjit Kaur, with whom he has two sons, Inder Iqbal Singh Atwal (also a politician & businessman) and Jasjeet Singh Atwal and three daughters, Dr. Kulminderjit Kaur, Parminderjit Kaur and Tripat Kaur Atwal. Jasjeet Atwal has a pair of twins.
