= Bassi Pathana Assembly constituency =

Legislative Assembly constituency in Punjab State, India

Coordinates: 30.69°N 76.4°E

Bassi Pathana
- Constituency No. 54 for the Punjab Legislative Assembly

Constituency details
- Country: India
- State: Punjab
- District: Fatehgarh Sahib
- Lok Sabha constituency: Fatehgarh Sahib
- Total electors: 149,248 (in 2022)
- Reservation: SC

Member of Legislative Assembly
- 16th Punjab Legislative Assembly
- Incumbent Rupinder Singh
- Party: AAP
- Elected year: 2022

Bassi Pathana is a Punjab Legislative Assembly constituency in Fatehgarh Sahib district, Punjab state, India.

== Members of the Legislative Assembly ==
Most successful parties from Bassi Pathana Vidhan Sabha
1. SAD (1 Time) (33.3%)
2. INC (1 Time) (33.3%)
3. AAP (1 Time) (33.3%)

Year	Member	Party
2012	Justice Nirmal Singh	Shiromani Akali Dal
2017	Gurpreet Singh	Indian National Congress
2022	Rupinder Singh	Aam Aadmi Party

== Election results ==
=== 2027 ===
Punjab Assembly election, 2027: Bassi Pathana
Party	Candidate	Votes	%	±%
AAP				
AD (WPD)	Satwant Singh			New entry
INC				
BSP				
SAD				New entry
BJP				New entry
NOTA	None of the above			
Majority				
Turnout				

=== 2022 ===
Punjab Assembly election, 2022: Bassi Pathana
Party	Candidate	Votes	%	±%
AAP	Rupinder Singh Happy	54,018	48.17	▲15.44
INC	Gurpreet Singh GP	16,177	14.43	▼27.12
Independent	Manohar Singh	13,796	12.3	New entry
SAD(A)	Dharam Singh	10,899	9.72	▲8.30
BSP	Shiv Kumar Kalyan	7,859	7.01	▲6.29
PLC	Deepak Jyoti	1,647	1.47	New entry
NOTA	None of the above	792	0.71	
Majority		37,841	33.74	
Turnout				
Registered electors		149,248		
AAP gain from INC		Swing		

=== 2017 ===
Punjab Assembly election, 2017: Bassi Pathana
Party	Candidate	Votes	%	±%
INC	Gurpreet Singh (politician)	47,309	41.55	▲7.81
AAP	Santokh Singh	37,273	32.73	New entry
SAD	Darbara Sing Guru	24,852	21.82	▼23.29
SAD(A)	Dharam Singh	1,618	1.42	▼0.60
BSP	Mohinder Singh	819	0.72	▼5.14
NOTA	None of the above	728	0.64	
Registered electors		142,920		
INC hold		Swing		

=== 2012 ===
Punjab Assembly election, 2012: 54. Bassi Pathana
Party	Candidate	Votes	%	±%
SAD	Justice Nirmal Singh	45,692	45.11	New entry
INC	Harbans Kaur Dullo	34,183	33.74	New entry
PPoP	Mohinder Pal	11,344	11.20	New entry
BSP	Amarnath Singh	5,941	5.86	New entry
Independent	Kuldeep Singh	2,090	2.06	New entry
SAD(A)	Dharam Singh	2,050	2.02	New entry
Majority		11,509	11.36	
Turnout		101,300	78.38	
Registered electors		129,234		
INC win (new seat)				
