= Nihal Singh Wala Assembly constituency =

Legislative Assembly constituency in Punjab State, India

Coordinates: 30.59°N 75.28°E

Nihal Singhwala
- Constituency No. 71 for the Punjab Legislative Assembly

Constituency details
- Country: India
- State: Punjab
- District: Moga
- Lok Sabha constituency: Faridkot
- Total electors: 198,817
- Reservation: SC

Member of Legislative Assembly
- 16th Punjab Legislative Assembly
- Incumbent Manjit Singh
- Party: Aam Aadmi Party
- Elected year: 2022

Nihal Singh Wala is one of the 117 Legislative Assembly constituencies of Punjab state in India. It is part of Moga district and is reserved for candidates belonging to the Scheduled Castes.

== Members of the Legislative Assembly ==
Most successful parties from Nihal Singh Wala Vidhan Sabha
1. CPI (6 Times) (42.9%)
2. SAD (4 Times) (28.6%)
3. AAP (2 Times) (14.3%)
4. INC (1 Time) (7.14%)
5. IND (1 Time) (7.14%)

Year	Member	Party
1962	Gurbux Singh	Communist Party of India
1967	Munsha Singh	Communist Party of India
1969	Dalip Singh	Indian National Congress
1972	Saggar Singh	Communist Party of India
1977	Gurdev Singh	Shiromani Akali Dal
1980	Saghar Singh	Communist Party of India
1985	Zora Singh	Shiromani Akali Dal
1992	Ajaib Singh	Communist Party of India
1997	Ajaib Singh	Communist Party of India
2002	Zora Singh	Shiromani Akali Dal
2007	Ajit Singh	Independent politician
2012	Rajwinder Kaur	Shiromani Akali Dal
2017	Manjit Singh	Aam Aadmi Party
2022	Manjit Singh	Aam Aadmi Party

== Election results ==
=== 2027 ===
Punjab Assembly election, 2027: Nihal Singh Wala
Party	Candidate	Votes	%	±%
AAP	Manjit Singh Bilaspur			
AD (WPD)				New entry
INC				
BSP				
SAD				
BJP				New entry
NOTA	None of the above			
Majority				
Turnout				

=== 2022 ===
Punjab Assembly election, 2022: Nihal SinghWala
Party	Candidate	Votes	%	±%
AAP	Manjit Singh Bilaspur	65,156	46.40	
INC	Bhupendra singh Sahoke	27,172	19.4	
SAD	Baldev Singh Manuke	26,758	19.1	
SAD(A)	Baldev Singh	14,618	10.4	
Independent	Guraditta Singh	3,535	2.5	
PLC	Mukhtiar Singh Sandhu S.P.	1,145	0.8	
NOTA	None of the Above	1,010	0.50	
Majority		37,984	26.88	
Registered electors		198,809		

=== 2017 ===
Punjab Assembly election, 2017: Nihal Singhwala
Party	Candidate	Votes	%	±%
AAP	Manjit Singh Bilaspur	67,313	44.5	
INC	Rajwinder Kaur	39,739	26.3	
SAD	Shiv Ram Kaler	34,865	23.0	
NOTA	None of the above	1,010	0.5	
Majority		27,574	18.3	
Turnout		150,363	78.7	
Registered electors		192,376		

=== 2012 ===
Punjab Assembly election, 2012: Nihal Singhwala
Party	Candidate	Votes	%	±%
SAD	Rajwinder Kaur	57,652	41.5	
INC	Ajit Singh Shant	57,061	41.1	
CPI	Mohinder Singh	17,513	12.6	
Majority		591	0.4	
Turnout		138,675	78.1	
Registered electors		177,567		

== See also ==
- List of constituencies of the Punjab Legislative Assembly
- Moga district
