= Bhucho Mandi Assembly constituency =

Legislative Assembly constituency in Punjab State, India

Coordinates: 30.21°N 75.09°E

Bhucho Mandi
- Constituency No. 91 for the Punjab Legislative Assembly

Constituency details
- Country: India
- State: Punjab
- District: Bathinda
- Lok Sabha constituency: Bathinda
- Total electors: 184,785 (in 2022)
- Reservation: SC

Member of Legislative Assembly
- 16th Punjab Legislative Assembly
- Incumbent Master Jagsir Singh
- Party: Aam Aadmi Party
- Elected year: 2022

Bhucho Mandi is a Punjab Legislative Assembly constituency in Bathinda district, Punjab state, India. It was redistricted from Nathana Assembly constituency.

== Members of the Legislative Assembly ==
Most successful parties from Bhucho Mandi Vidhan Sabha
1. INC (2 Times) (66.7%)
2. AAP (1 Time) (33.3%)

Year	Member	Party
Created from Nathana Assembly constituency
2012	Ajaib Singh Bhatti	Indian National Congress
2017	Pritam Singh Kotbhai	Indian National Congress
2022	Jagsir Singh	Aam Aadmi Party

== Election results ==
=== 2027 ===
Punjab Assembly election, 2027: Bhucho Mandi
Party	Candidate	Votes	%	±%
AAP				
AD (WPD)				New entry
INC				
BSP				
SAD				
BJP				
NOTA	None of the above			
Majority				
Turnout				

=== 2022 ===
Punjab Assembly election, 2022: Bhucho Mandi
Party	Candidate	Votes	%	±%
AAP	Jagsir Singh	85,778	57.29	▲23.52
SAD	Darshan Singh Kotfatta	35,566	23.75	▼5.43
INC	Pritam Singh Kotbhai	20,681	13.81	▼20.39
Independent	Baldev Singh Aklia	2,546	1.7	▲1.43
BJP	Rupinderjit Singh	2,330	1.56	New entry
NOTA	None of the above	1,555	1.04%	▲0.57
Majority		50,212	33.54	▲33.11
Turnout		149,724	81.02	▼3.31
Registered electors		184,785		
AAP gain from INC		Swing		

=== 2017 ===
Punjab Assembly election, 2017: Bhucho Mandi
Party	Candidate	Votes	%	±%
INC	Pritam Singh Kotbhai	51,605	34.04	▼8.34
AAP	Jagsir Singh	50,960	33.61	New entry
SAD	Harpreet Singh	44,025	29.04	▼12.39
Independent	Kiranjit Singh Gehri	1,775	1.17	New entry
BSP	Mumtaj	1,137	0.75	▼0.37
AITC	Surinder Pal Somi Tungwalia	985	0.65	New entry
NOTA	None of the above	711	0.47	
Majority		645	0.43	
Turnout		151,608	84.33	
Registered electors		179,786		
INC hold		Swing		

=== 2012 ===
Punjab Assembly election, 2012: 91. Bhucho Mandi
Party	Candidate	Votes	%	±%
INC	Ajaib Singh Bhatti	57,515	42.38	New entry
SAD	Pritam Singh	56,227	41.43	New entry
PPoP	Harvinder Singh Laddi	16,227	11.96	New entry
LJP	Raja Singh Sivian	1,578	1.16	New entry
Majority		1,288	0.95	
Turnout		135,720	84.60	
INC win (new seat)				
