= Balwinder Singh =

Indian kabaddi player

Balwinder Singh, also known as Fidda or Fiddu, is an Indian professional Kabaddi player who received Arjuna Award in 1999 for his performances. He was born on 23 March 1956 to Charan Kaur and Sardar Banta Singh in village Tandi, District Kapurthala. In 1989, he captained the Indian Kabaddi team in South Asian Federation Games in Islamabad where their team secured first position, and he was declared the best player of SAFG. In 1999 he was nominated for the highly coveted Arjun Award (the highest sports award by Govt. of India) and honoured with the recognition of Arjuna Award on 29 August 2000. He has also been bestowed with Maharaja Ranjit Singh Award, Hari Singh Nalua Award and LifeTime Achievement Award from Punjab Police.

He is titled Crownless King of Kabbadi, Rustm – e – Kabaddi, Bakan Khiladi and Kabaddi Da ladla puttar (Son of Kabaddi).
