= Malout Assembly constituency =

Legislative Assembly constituency in Punjab State, India

Coordinates: 30.19°N 74.5°E

Malout
- Constituency No. 85 for the Punjab Legislative Assembly

Constituency details
- Country: India
- State: Punjab
- District: Sri Muktsar Sahib
- Lok Sabha constituency: Firozpur
- Total electors: 176,573
- Reservation: SC

Member of Legislative Assembly
- 16th Punjab Legislative Assembly
- Incumbent Baljit Kaur
- Party: Aam Aadmi Party
- Elected year: 2022

Malout is one of the 117 Legislative Assembly constituencies of Punjab state in India. It is part of Sri Muktsar Sahib district and is reserved for candidates belonging to the Scheduled Castes since 1977. There have been calls from some local leaders and residents to review the reservation status, citing that it has remained reserved for a considerably very long period.

== Members of the Legislative Assembly ==
Most successful parties from Malout Vidhan Sabha
1. INC(8 Times) (50.0%)
2. SAD (3 Times) (18.8%)
3. CPI (2 Times) (12.5%)
4. AAP (1 Time) (6.25%)
5. INC (I) (1 Time) (6.25%)
6. UCPI (1 Time) (6.25%)

Year	Member	Party
1957	Teja Singh	Indian National Congress
1957	Parkash Singh	Indian National Congress
1962	Gurmit Singh	Indian National Congress
1967	Gurmit Singh	Indian National Congress
1969	Gurmit Singh	Indian National Congress
1972	Gurbinder Kaur	Indian National Congress
1977	Daua Ram	Communist Party of India
1980	Matu Ram	Indian National Congress
1985	Shiv Chand	Indian National Congress
1992	Baldev Singh Ballamgarh	United Communist Party of India
1997	Sujan Singh	Shiromani Akali Dal
2002	Nathu Ram	Communist Party of India
2007	Harpreet Singh	Shiromani Akali Dal
2012	Harpreet Singh	Shiromani Akali Dal
2017	Ajaib Singh Bhatti	Indian National Congress
2022	Baljit Kaur	Aam Aadmi Party

== Election results ==
=== 2027 ===
Punjab Assembly election, 2027: Malout
Party	Candidate	Votes	%	±%
AAP				
AD (WPD)				New entry
INC				
BSP				
SAD				
BJP				New entry
NOTA	None of the above			
Majority				
Turnout				

=== 2022 ===
Punjab Assembly election, 2022: Malout
Party	Candidate	Votes	%	±%
AAP	Baljit Kaur	77,370	55.6	
SAD	Harpreet Singh	37,109	26.67	
INC	Prof. Rupinder Kaur Ruby	17,652	12.68	
PLC	Karanvir Singh	1,169	0.9	
NOTA	None of the above	897	0.5	
Majority		40,261	28.93	
Turnout		139,167		
Registered electors		176,919		
AAP gain from INC		Swing		

=== 2017 ===
Punjab Assembly election, 2017: Malout
Party	Candidate	Votes	%	±%
INC	Ajaib Singh Bhatti	49,098	36.1	
SAD	Darshan Singh	44,109	32.4	
AAP	Principal Baldev Singh	38,663	28.4	
NOTA	None of the above	899	0.5	
Majority		4,989	3.7	
Turnout		135,295	82.6	
Registered electors		164,832		
INC gain from SAD				

=== 1957 ===
Punjab Assembly election, 1957
Party	Candidate	Votes	%	±%
INC	Parkash Singh Badal	39,255		
Independent	Ujjagar Singh	13,571		
Majority				
INC gain from				

== See also ==
- List of constituencies of the Punjab Legislative Assembly
- Sri Muktsar Sahib district
