= Ajaib Singh Bhatti =

Indian politician

Bhatti

Deputy Speaker of Punjab Assembly
- In office 16 June 2017 – 10 March 2022
- Preceded by: Dinesh Singh
- Succeeded by: Jai Krishan Singh
- Constituency: Malout

Personal details
- Born: 28 March 1951 (age 75) Bilaspur, Punjab, India
- Party: INC
- Other political affiliations: BJP
- Spouse: Manjit Kaur
- Children: 2 sons and 1 daughter
- Parent(s): Arjan Singh and Sant Kaur

Ajaib Singh Bhatti was deputy speaker of the Punjab Legislative Assembly from 2017 to 2022.

== Early life ==
A. S. Bhatti started his career as a teacher in rural areas of Bathinda besides working as a Block Development and Panchayat Officer (BDPO) for nearly a year. He joined Punjab Civil Services (executive branch) in 1984 and served in various magisterial and civilian assignments in different parts of the State. He also served as Additional Deputy Commissioner in Muktsar and Bathinda districts. In 2007 he joined Indian National Congress.

== Political career ==
First time he contested in 2007 from Nathana Assembly constituency (now called Bhucho Mandi) and won by a small margin from Gura Singh Tungwali Sitting MLA. Second time contested from Bhucho Mandi in 2012 and won. Now, he is the MLA from Malout Assembly constituency.
