= Garhshankar Assembly constituency =

Constituency of the Punjab legislative assembly in India

Coordinates: 31.217°N 76.144°E

Garhshankar
- Constituency No. 45 for the Punjab Legislative Assembly

Constituency details
- Country: India
- State: Punjab
- District: Hoshiarpur
- Lok Sabha constituency: Anandpur Sahib
- Established: 1957
- Total electors: 175,287 (in 2022)
- Reservation: None

Member of Legislative Assembly
- 16th Punjab Legislative Assembly
- Incumbent Jai Krishan Singh
- Party: Aam Aadmi Party
- Elected year: 2017

Garhshankar Assembly constituency (Sl. No.: 45) is a Punjab Legislative Assembly constituency representing Garhshankar in Hoshiarpur district, Punjab state, India. Currently, it is represented by Jai Krishan Singh of the Aam Aadmi Party who is also Deputy Speaker of Punjab Assembly. The last assembly elections were held in February 2022.

== Members of the Legislative Assembly ==
Most successful parties from Garhshankar Vidhan Sabha
1. INC (8 Times) (44.4%)
2. CPI (3 Times) (16.7%)
3. AAP (2 Times) (11.1%)
4. BSP (2 Times) (11.1%)
5. BJP (1 Time) (5.56%)
6. INC (I) (1 Time) (5.56%)
7. SAD (1 Time) (5.56%)

Year	Member	Party
1952	Kartar Singh	Indian National Congress
1957	Dasonda Singh	Indian National Congress
1957	Bhag Singh	Communist Party of India
1962	Rattan Singh	Indian National Congress
1967	Rattan Singh	Indian National Congress
1969	Rattan Singh	Indian National Congress
1972	Darshan Singh	Communist Party of India
1977	Darshan Singh	Communist Party of India
1980	Sarwan Ram	Indian National Congress (Indira)
1985	Sarwan Ram	Indian National Congress
1992	Shingara Ram	Bahujan Samaj Party
1997	Shingara Ram	Bahujan Samaj Party
2002	Avinash Rai Khanna	Bharatiya Janata Party
2004 (Note: by-election)	Love Kumar Goldy	Indian National Congress
2007	Love Kumar Goldy	Indian National Congress
2012	Surinder Singh Bhullewal Rathaan	Shiromani Akali Dal
2017	Jai Kishan Singh Rori	Aam Aadmi Party
2022	Jai Kishan Singh Rori	Aam Aadmi Party

== Election results ==
=== 2027 ===
Punjab Assembly election, 2027: Garhshankar
Party	Candidate	Votes	%	±%
AAP	Jai Krishan Singh			
AD (WPD)				New entry
INC				
BSP				
SAD				
BJP				
NOTA	None of the above			
Majority				
Turnout				

=== 2022 ===
2022 Punjab Legislative Assembly election: Garhshankar
Party	Candidate	Votes	%	±%
AAP	Jai Krishan Singh	32,341	26.41	
INC	Amarpreet Lally	28,162	22.99	
SAD	Surinder Singh Heer	25,430	20.76	
BJP	Nimisha Mehta	24,735	20.2	New entry
Independent	Jang Bahadur Singh	4,106	3.35	
Independent	Mohan Singh	2,470	2.02	
CPI(M)	Mohinder Kumar	1,189	0.97	
NOTA	None of the above	1,078	0.88	
Majority		4,179	3.42	
Turnout				
Registered electors		175,287		
AAP hold		Swing		

=== 2017 ===
Punjab Assembly election, 2017: Garhshankar
Party	Candidate	Votes	%	±%
AAP	Jai Kishan Singh Rori	41,720	33.50	
SAD	Surinder Singh Heer	40,070	32.18	
INC	Lov Kumar Goldy	31,909	25.62	
BSP	Bakhsish Singh	6,031	4.84	
CPI(M)	Harbhajan Singh	2,217	1.78	
NOTA	None of the above	1,121	0.90	
Majority				
Turnout		125,658		
Registered electors		169,609		
AAP gain from SAD		Swing		
