= Romesh Chander Dogra =

Minister Government of Punjab for Health and Family Welfare Technical Education
- In office 2002–2007

Deputy speaker of the Punjab Legislative Assembly
- In office 7 April 1992 – 7 January 1996

Personal details
- Party: Indian National Congress
- Occupation: Politician

Romesh Chander Dogra was an Indian politician from the state of Punjab. He was a minister in the Punjab government and the deputy speaker of the Punjab Legislative Assembly.

== Constituency ==
Dogra represented the Dasuya assembly constituency and was a four-term member of the Punjab Legislative Assembly from 1985 to 2007.

== Political Party ==
Dogra was a member of Indian National Congress.

== Death ==
Dogra died on 23 April 2013.
