= Kewal Krishan =

Indian medical practitioner and politician

Kewal Krishan (10 October 1923 – 30 June 2008) was a medical practitioner and politician in Punjab, India. He was the Speaker of the Punjab Legislative Assembly (Vidhan Sabha) from 2002 to 2007.

He was first elected as an Indian National Congress member of the Punjab Legislative Assembly in 1969, serving as Speaker from 1973 to 1977 and again from 2002 to 2007. He served as Minister of Finance in the Punjab Government from 1980 to 1983.

In 2005, he led an Assembly delegation on a goodwill visit to the Punjab Assembly in Pakistan.

In January 2006 he announced his intention of standing down as an MLA, saying "I am 83 and have played my innings in politics. I do not want to continue till 90. Now the time has come for the younger generation to take the reins." He died on 30 June 2008, of a heart attack.
