= Rana K. P. Singh =

Indian politician

Rana Kanwar Pal Singh
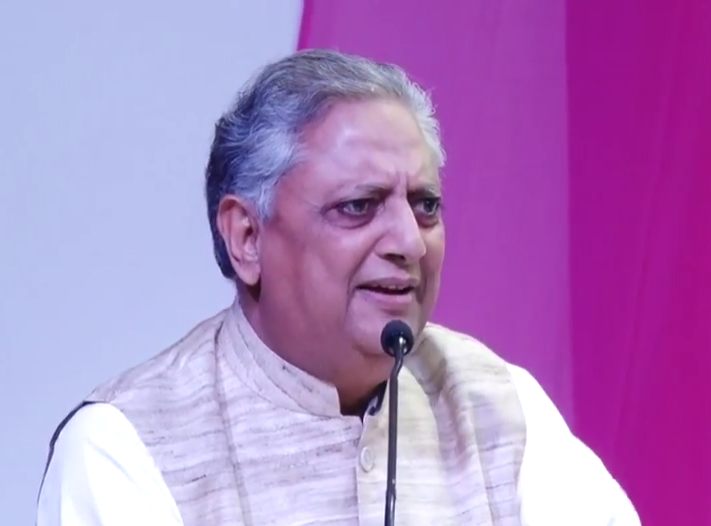
- Rana Kanwar Pal Singh

Speaker of Punjab assembly
- In office 27 March 2017 – 21 March 2022
- Governor: V. P. Singh Badnore
- Preceded by: Charanjit Singh Atwal
- Succeeded by: Kultar Singh Sandhwan
- Constituency: Anandpur Sahib

Member of the Punjab Legislative Assembly
- In office 2002, 2007, 2017 – 10 March 2022
- Constituency: Anandpur Sahib

Personal details
- Born: 16 October 1957 (age 69) Jhandian (Punjab, India)
- Party: Indian National Congress
- Children: 1 Son and 2 Daughters
- As of 26 June, 2018

Rana Kanwar Pal Singh, popularly known as Rana K.P. (born 16 October 1957) is an Indian politician from INC, and was a member of the Punjab Legislative Assembly thrice. He was the Speaker of Punjab Legislative Assembly from 2017 to 2022.

== Early life and education ==
=== Early life ===
Singh was born in a Prominent Hindu Rajput Katoch family in Rupnagar. He is the head of the Jhandian family of the Katoch clan. His family owns vast lands and orchards in Punjab and had a big holding of lands in Lyalpur of pre-partition Punjab also.

=== Education ===
After completing his primary education/schooling from Nurpur Bedi, District Ropar, he did his graduation from Government College, Ropar. Subsequently, he obtained the professional degree of LLB and started practice as an Advocate. As a practicing lawyer he had very successful career in advocacy.

== Political career ==
A voracious reader by nature, he took a keen interest in agriculture apart from being a successful lawyer. He joined Indian National Congress through its youth organization Youth Congress in the year 1975 and since then he has been working continuously and untiringly for the people of Ropar district. He has contested assembly elections from Nangal and Anandpur Sahib constituency for five times since 2002.

He was elected as MLA from Nangal Constituency and Anandpur Sahib constituency in 2002, 2007, 2017. In 2004 he was appointed as a chairman, Punjab Pollution Control Board and later he was made Chief Parliamentary Secretary (Industry & Commerce) in Punjab Government. He worked as a Chairman of various Assembly Committees. Apart from being associated with party organizations, he was also appointed Senator in Punjab University from the year 2002–07.

== Electoral performance ==
Punjab Assembly election, 2017: Anandpur Sahib
Party	Candidate	Votes	%	±%
INC	Kanwar Pal Singh	60,800	45.01	
BJP	Parminder Sharma	36,919	27.33	
AAP	Sanjeev Gautam	30,304	22.43	
Independent	Nutan Kumar	2,092	1.55	
BSP	Gurcharan Singh Khalsa	1,442	1.07	
CPI(M)	Mohinder Singh	1,026	0.76	
Independent	Pritam Singh Bharatgarh	602	0.45	
PDP	Subhash Chander Sharma	518	0.38	
SAD(A)	Harbhjn Singh	517	0.38	
NOTA	None of the above	858	0.64	
Majority		23,881	32.29	
Registered electors		180,222		
INC gain from BJP				

Punjab Assembly election, 2022: Anandpur Sahib
Party	Candidate	Votes	%	±%
AAP	Harjot Singh Bains	82,132	57.92	
INC	Kanwar Pal Singh	36,352	25.63	
BJP	Parminder Sharma	11,433	8.06	
BSP	Nutan Kumar	5,923	4.18	
SAD(A)	Ranjit Singh	1,459	1.03	
NOTA	None of the above	1290	0.91	
Majority		45,780	32.29	
Turnout		141809		
Registered electors		193,750		
AAP gain from INC				

== Personal life ==
=== Family ===
He married Rani Shashi Kanta a Bhati Rajput on 6 May 1981. He has two daughters (Married and one son all married.

=== Other works ===
He is associated with various Congress party organizations and served the same as, Gen. Sec. Punjab Youth Cong., Gen. Sec. Punjab Pradesh Congress Committee, Spokesman Punjab Pradesh Congress Committee and Member of All India Congress Committee and Vice President of Punjab Pradesh Congress Committee. He is against putting Rajput Sikhs in Backward Class because of their glorious past and was also appointed Patron of 'All India Rajput Kashatriya Mahasabha'.
