= Kushaldeep Singh Dhillon =

Indian politician

Kushaldeep Singh Dhillon (born 21 May 1973) is an Indian politician affiliated with Indian National Congress. He is a former member of the Punjab Legislative Assembly representing Faridkot.
