= Dalbir Singh Verka =

Indian politician

Member of Punjab Legislative Assembly
- In office 27 February 2007 – 6 March 2012
- Preceded by: Raj Kumar Verka
- Succeeded by: Constituency disbanded
- Constituency: Verka
- In office 1985–1987
- Preceded by: Sohan Singh
- Succeeded by: Gurmej Singh
- Constituency: Verka

Personal details
- Born: Punjab, India
- Party: Akali Dal (Waris Punjab De)
- Other political affiliations: Aam Aadmi Party; Shiromani Akali Dal; Indian National Congress

Dr. Dalbir Singh Verka is an Indian politician of Akali Dal Waris Punjab De, and former Member of the Legislative Assembly for Verka.

== Political career ==
Verka initially began his political career by getting elected as MLA from Verka in 1985 as a candidate of Indian National Congress. He was elected from this constituency again in 2007 as a member of the Shiromani Akali Dal. Shiromani Akali Dal declared Verka as its candidate for Jandiala in 2017, but he was unsuccessful. Verka contested in 2022 from Amritsar West on the ticket of Shiromani Akali Dal, coming in third place. He was inducted into Aam Aadmi Party by Bhagwant Mann in 2024. Verka joined Akali Dal (Waris Punjab De) in August 2026 in the presence of Tarsem Singh, father of MP Amritpal Singh.

== Electoral performance ==
Punjab Legislative Assembly Election, 1985: Verka
| Party | Candidate | Votes | % | ±% |
|---|---|---|---|---|
| INC | Dalbir Singh Verka | 22,128 | 46.13 | ▼1.47 |
| SAD | Khajan Singh | 15,604 | 32.53 | New entry |
| CPI | Sohan Singh | 8,028 | 16.74 | ▼31.54 |
| Independent | Shanti Devi | 650 | 1.36 | New entry |
| Majority | | 6,524 | 13.60 | |
| Turnout | | 47,965 | 51.91 | |
| Registered electors | | 99,482 | | |
| INC gain from CPI | | Swing | | |

Punjab Assembly election, 2007: Verka
| Party | Candidate | Votes | % | ±% |
|---|---|---|---|---|
| SAD | Dalbir Singh Verka | 67,699 | 53.05 | ▲11.77 |
| INC | Raj Kumar Verka | 49,602 | 38.87 | ▼12.44 |
| BSP | Bhajan Singh | 2,735 | 2.14 | ▲0.98 |
| CPI(M) | Surinder Singh | 2,503 | 1.96 | ▼0.31 |
| Independent | Puran Chand | 2,176 | 1.71 | New entry |
| Independent | Tarsem Singh | 1,552 | 1.22 | New entry |
| BSP (A) | Kawaljit Singh | 1,345 | 1.05 | ▲0.12 |
| Majority | | 18,097 | 14.18 | |
| Turnout | | 127,612 | | |
| Registered electors | | | | |
| SAD gain from INC | | Swing | | |

Punjab Assembly election, 2017: Jandiala
| Party | Candidate | Votes | % | ±% |
|---|---|---|---|---|
| INC | Sukhwinder Singh Danny Bandala | 53,042 | 43.89 | |
| SAD | Dalbir Singh Verka | 34,620 | 27.74 | |
| AAP | Harbhajan Singh E.T.O. | 33,912 | 27.17 | |
| BSP | Satpal Singh Pakhoke | 814 | 0.65 | |
| APP | Hardeep Singh | 679 | 0.54 | |
| BSP (A) | Vikramjit Singh | 669 | 0.54 | |
| Independent | Harbhajan Singh Jandiala | 581 | 0.47 | |
| NOTA | None of the above | | | |
| Majority | | | | |
| Turnout | | | | |
| Registered electors | | 169,613 | | |
| INC gain from SAD | | Swing | | |

Assembly Election, 2022: Amritsar West
| Party | Candidate | Votes | % | ±% |
|---|---|---|---|---|
| AAP | Jasbir Singh Sandhu | 69,251 | 58.39 | |
| INC | Raj Kumar Verka | 25,338 | 21.36 | |
| SAD | Dalbir Singh Verka | 10,370 | 8.74 | |
| BJP | Amit Kumar | 8,999 | 7.59 | |
| CPI | Amarjit Singh Asal | 1,368 | 1.15 | |
| NOTA | None of the above | 987 | 0.83 | |
| Majority | | 43,913 | 37.03 | |
| Turnout | | 118,606 | 55.28 | |
| Registered electors | | 214,073 | | |
| AAP gain from INC | | Swing | | |
