= Kanwar Sandhu =

Indian politician

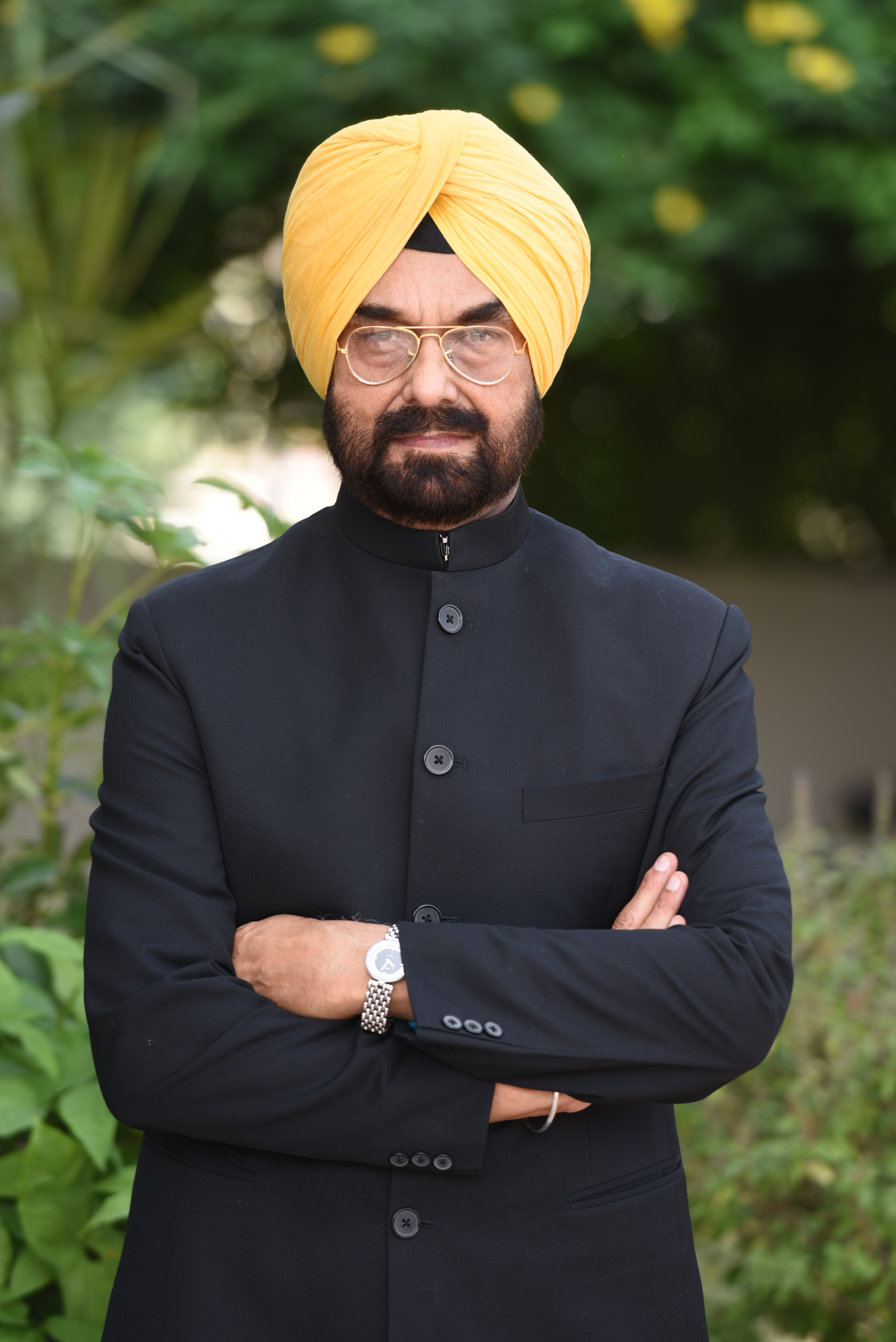
- Sandhu in 2017.

Member of the Punjab Legislative Assembly
- In office 2017–2022
- Preceded by: Jagmohan Singh Kang
- Succeeded by: Anmol Gagan Maan
- Constituency: Kharar

Personal details
- Born: 8 June 1955 (age 71) Sri Ganganagar, Rajasthan, India
- Party: Aam Aadmi Party
- Spouse: Bittu Sandhu
- Profession: Journalist
- Website: kanwarsandhu.com

Kanwar Sandhu is an Indian politician and journalist. He was elected as a member of Punjab Legislative Assembly from Kharar in 2017. He did not contest the 2022 Assembly Elections.

== Personal life ==
Kanwar Sandhu was born in 1955 in Sri Ganganagar, to father Hari Singh Sandhu and mother Rajbans Sandhu. His ancestors were from an agricultural family and with army background from Lahore division of Central Punjab. His family was allotted a piece of agricultural land in Sargodha district of West Punjab.

Later on his family moved to Sri Ganganagar in Rajasthan.

== Education ==
He did his schooling from Punjab Public school, Nabha in 1970. He went on to do B.A. from GNDU, Amritsar in 1974. After graduating with B.A., he did M.A. in English literature from GNDU, Amritsar in 1976. Afterwards Sandhu did Bachelor of Journalism from Panjab University in 1977.

== Journalism ==
Kanwar Sandhu started his journalism career with North Western India's premier English language newspaper "The Tribune". During the days of militancy, he worked with the "India Today" news magazine. Later on, Sandhu served as resident editor at "The Indian Express".

He has also served as the resident editor for "Hindustan Times".

In 2010, Sandhu organized a multi-language TV channel known as "Day & Night News". This channel gave full coverage to all the divergent political points of view. His show "Hello North America" which was aired on this news channel became an instant hit.

Sandhu later joined "The Tribune" as its executive editor. He has also served as managing editor of "Day & Night News TV".

== Political career ==
In 2017, Sandhu was elected to the Punjab Legislative Assembly from Kharar on an Aam Aadmi Party ticket. He defeated the veteran leader Jagmohan Singh Kang by a margin of over 2000 votes.

After the Aam Aadmi Party came to power in 2022, Sandhu said "As Aam Aadmi Party sweeps Punjab, I along with team recall with pride pathbreaking work we did in preparing party’s manifesto for 2017 polls. Since I have stepped aside due to differences over autonomy and other issues, I am confident promises made then and now will be fulfilled."
