= Verka Assembly constituency =

Former constituency of the Punjab Legislative Assembly

Coordinates: 31.67°N 74.93°E

Verka
- Former constituency No. 14 for the Punjab Legislative Assembly

Constituency details
- Country: India
- State: Punjab
- District: Amritsar
- Lok Sabha constituency: Amritsar
- Established: 1967
- Abolished: 2012
- Total electors: 127,612 (2007)
- Reservation: None

Verka was a Punjab Legislative Assembly constituency till 2012.

== Members of the Legislative Assembly ==
Year	Member	Party
1967	K. Singh	Akali Dal – Sant Fateh Singh Group
1969	Gurmej Singh	Indian National Congress
1972	Gurmej Singh	Indian National Congress
1977	Khajan Singh	Shiromani Akali Dal
1980	Sohan Singh	Communist Party of India
1985	Dalbir Singh Verka	Indian National Congress
1992	Gurmej Singh	Indian National Congress
1997	Ujagar Singh	Shiromani Akali Dal
2002	Raj Kumar Verka	Indian National Congress
2007	Dalbir Singh Verka	Shiromani Akali Dal

== Election results ==
=== 2007 ===
Punjab Assembly election, 2007: Verka
Party	Candidate	Votes	%	±%
SAD	Dalbir Singh Verka	67,699	53.05	▲11.77
INC	Raj Kumar Verka	49,602	38.87	▼12.44
BSP	Bhajan Singh	2,735	2.14	▲0.98
CPI(M)	Surinder Singh	2,503	1.96	▼0.31
Independent	Puran Chand	2,176	1.71	New entry
Independent	Tarsem Singh	1,552	1.22	New entry
BSP (A)	Kawaljit Singh	1,345	1.05	▲0.12
Majority		18,097	14.18	
Turnout		127,612		
Registered electors				
SAD gain from INC		Swing		

=== 1985 ===
Punjab Legislative Assembly Election, 1985: Verka
Party	Candidate	Votes	%	±%
INC	Dalbir Singh Verka	22,128	46.13	▼1.47
SAD	Khajan Singh	15,604	32.53	New entry
CPI	Sohan Singh	8,028	16.74	▼31.54
Independent	Shanti Devi	650	1.36	New entry
Majority		6,524	13.60	
Turnout		47,965	51.91	
Registered electors		99,482		
INC gain from CPI		Swing		
