= Balbir Singh Sidhu (politician) =

Indian politician

Cabinet Minister of Health and Family Welfare and Labour, Punjab
- In office 16 March 2018 – 18 September 2021
- Chief Minister: Capt. Amarinder Singh

Member of Punjab Legislative Assembly
- In office 2007–2012
- Preceded by: Bir Devinder Singh
- Succeeded by: Jagmohan Singh Kang
- Constituency: Kharar
- In office 2012 – 10 March 2022
- Succeeded by: Kulwant Singh
- Constituency: S. A. S. Nagar

Personal details
- Born: 1 April 1959 (age 67) Tapa Mandi, Barnala, Punjab
- Party: Indian National Congress (present)
- Other political affiliations: Bharatiya Janata Party (from June 2022 till 13 October 2023)
- Spouse: Smt. Daljit Kaur
- Children: 1 Son and 1 Daughter
- Parent(s): S. Jang Singh and Smt. Ranjit Kaur
- Website: Official website

Balbir Singh Sidhu is the former member of Punjab Legislative Assembly and was ex Cabinet Minister of Health and Family Welfare and Labour in Punjab Government. Sidhu is a 3 time MLA and served as Former Punjab Health and Family Welfare Minister. He has represented Kharar and S.A.S Nagar constituencies.

== Career ==
He joined the Indian National Congress in the '90s and served as Joint Secretary, Vice president, and Senior Vice president of the Punjab Youth Congress Committee. He was also appointed in charge of Congress during Lok Sabha election 1999 in Punjab.

In 2007 Punjab assembly election he won from Kharar Assembly constituency by defeating Shiromani Akali Dal candidate Jasjit Singh. Again won from S. A. S. Nagar Assembly constituency in 2012 and then in 2017 elections.

He joined Bhartiya Janata Party on 4 June 2022 along with Raj Kumar Verka, Gurpreet Singh Kangar, Sundar Sham Arora, and others at the party office in Chandigarh.
