= Jandiala Guru =

- Town
- Nickname: City of Seven Gates
- Location in Punjab, India Jandiala Guru (India)
- Coordinates: 31°33′41″N 75°1′36″E
- Country: India
- State: Punjab
- Region: Majha
- District: Amritsar

Population (2011)
  - Total: 29,232

Languages
  - Official: Punjabi
- Time zone: UTC+5:30 (IST)
- PIN: 143115
- Vehicle registration: PB-02
- Nearest city: Amritsar
- Website: www.jandialaguru.com

Jandiala Guru, commonly known as Jandiala, is a town in the Amritsar district of Punjab, India. It is located on the Grand Trunk Road, and has an altitude of 229 m (754 ft). The locality is associated in history with a heterodoxical Sikh sect known as the Niranjanias or Hindalis.

== History ==
Jandiala Guru is named after Jand, a son of the founder. The municipality was created in 1867 during the colonial period of British rule and formed part of Amritsar Tehsil. The town was situated on the route of the North-Western Railway. The population, according to the 1901 census, was 7,750, and the revenue of the town in 1903-4 was Rs. 8,400, mainly from octroi taxes.

At the turn of the 21st century the population was estimated at 100,000. Large communities are Ghangas (Jatts), Majhbi Sikh SC, Jains (mainly jewelers, grain merchants, and businessmen), Malhotras (Khatri), Kamboj & Thatheras (utensil makers), and Christians. Large concentration of these skillful artisans make Jandiala Guru the hub for jewelry and utensils manufacturing for the surrounding areas.

Previously, it was surrounded by a mud wall and had seven gates. Some of these gates or their ruins are still visible.

The town has religious diversity. A number of popular and well visited religious places for Sikhs, Hindus, Jains and Muslims exist in and around the town. A historical Gurudwara of Baba Hundal (Baba Hundal Tap Asthan) is well known and well visited religious place.

A crafts colony of Thatheras was established during the reign of Maharaja Ranjit Singh the great 19th Century Sikh Monarch, who encouraged skilled metal crafters from Kashmir to settle here.

In 2014, the traditional brass and copper craft of utensil making among the Thatheras of Jandiala Guru got enlisted on the List of Intangible Cultural Heritage by UNESCO. After the listing, the Deputy Commissioner of Amritsar launched Project Virasat to revive this craft.

== Demographics ==
The table below shows the population of different religious groups in Jandiala Guru city and their gender ratio, as of 2011 census.

Population by religious groups in Jandiala Guru city, 2011 census
Religion	Total	Female	Male	Gender ratio
Sikh	18,495	8,707	9,788	889
Hindu	9,814	4,444	5,370	827
Jain	578	265	313	846
Christian	168	79	89	887
Muslim	142	66	76	868
Buddhist	1	0	1	--
Other religions	15	5	10	500
Not stated	19	11	8	1375
Total	29,232	13,577	15,655	867

== Politics ==
The city is part of the Jandiala Assembly Constituency.
