= Amritsar West Assembly constituency =

Legislative Assembly constituency in Punjab State, India

Coordinates: 31.64°N 74.82°E

Amritsar West
- Constituency No. 16 for the Punjab Legislative Assembly

Constituency details
- Country: India
- State: Punjab
- District: Amritsar
- Lok Sabha constituency: Amritsar
- Total electors: 214,073 (in 2022)
- Reservation: SC

Member of Legislative Assembly
- 16th Punjab Legislative Assembly
- Incumbent Jasbir Singh Sandhu
- Party: Aam Aadmi Party
- Elected year: 2022

Amritsar West is a Punjab Legislative Assembly constituency in Amritsar district, Punjab state, India.

== Members of the Legislative Assembly ==
Most successful parties from Amritsar West Vidhan Sabha
1. CPI (5 Times) (31.2%)
2. INC (5 Times) (31.2%)
3. IND (2 Times) (12.5%)
4. BJS (2 Times) (12.5%)
5. AAP (1 Time) (6.25%)
6. INC (I) (1 Time) (6.25%)

Year	Member	Party
1952	Shanoo Devi	Indian National Congress
1957	Balram Das Tandon	Bharatiya Jana Sangh
1962	Balram Das Tandon	Bharatiya Jana Sangh
1967	Satyapal Dang	Communist Party of India
1969	Satyapal Dang	Communist Party of India
1972	Satyapal Dang	Communist Party of India
1977	Satyapal Dang	Communist Party of India
1980	Sewa Ram	Indian National Congress (Indira)
1985	Sewa Ram	Indian National Congress
1992	Vimla Dang	Communist Party of India
1997	Om Parkash Soni	Independent
2002	Om Parkash Soni	Independent
2007	Om Parkash Soni	Indian National Congress
2012	Raj Kumar Verka	Indian National Congress
2017	Raj Kumar Verka	Indian National Congress
2022	Jasbir Singh Sandhu	Aam Aadmi Party

== Election results ==
=== 2027 ===
Punjab Assembly election, 2027: Amritsar West
Party	Candidate	Votes	%	±%
AAP				
AD (WPD)				New entry
INC				
BSP				
SAD				
BJP				
NOTA	None of the above			
Majority				
Turnout				

=== 2022 ===
Assembly Election, 2022: Amritsar West
Party	Candidate	Votes	%	±%
AAP	Jasbir Singh Sandhu	69,251	58.39	
INC	Raj Kumar Verka	25,338	21.36	
SAD	Dalbir Singh Verka	10,370	8.74	
BJP	Amit Kumar	8,999	7.59	
CPI	Amarjit Singh Asal	1,368	1.15	
NOTA	None of the above	987	0.83	
Majority		43,913	37.03	
Turnout		118,606	55.28	
Registered electors		214,073		
AAP gain from INC		Swing		

=== 2017 ===
Punjab Assembly election, 2017: Amritsar West
Party	Candidate	Votes	%	±%
INC	Raj Kumar Verka	52,271	50.84	
BJP	Rakesh Gill	24,424	23.82	
AAP	Balwinder Singh Sahota	24,731	23.17	
CPI	Gurnam Kaur	1,725	1.62	
BSP	Jaswant Singh	847	0.79	
APP	Satnam Singh	409	0.38	
BSP (A)	Balwinder Singh	407	0.38	
Registered electors		179,766		
