= Jandiala Assembly constituency =

Legislative Assembly constituency in Punjab State, India

Coordinates: 31.23°N 75.96°E

Jandiala
- Constituency No. 14 for the Punjab Legislative Assembly

Constituency details
- Country: India
- State: Punjab
- District: Amritsar
- Lok Sabha constituency: Khadoor Sahib
- Total electors: 180,674 (in 2022)
- Reservation: SC

Member of Legislative Assembly
- 16th Punjab Legislative Assembly
- Incumbent Harbhajan Singh E.T.O.
- Party: Aam Aadmi Party
- Elected year: 2022

Jandiala is a Punjab Legislative Assembly constituency in Amritsar district, Punjab state, India. It includes Jandiala Guru town.

== Members of the Legislative Assembly ==
Most successful parties from Jandiala Vidhan Sabha
1. SAD (8 Times) (61.5%)
2. INC (4 Times) (30.8%)
3. AAP (1 Time) (7.69%)

Election	Name	Party
Created from Nagoke constituency
1967	A. Singh	Indian National Congress
1969	Tara Singh	Shiromani Akali Dal
1972	Karnail Singh	Shiromani Akali Dal
1977	Dalbir Singh	Shiromani Akali Dal
1980	Tara Singh	Shiromani Akali Dal
1985	Ranjit Singh	Shiromani Akali Dal
1992	Sardul Singh	Indian National Congress
1997	Ajaypal Singh Mirankot	Shiromani Akali Dal
2002	Sardul Singh	Indian National Congress
2007	Malkiat Singh	Shiromani Akali Dal
2012	Baljit Singh Jalal Usma	Shiromani Akali Dal
2017	Sukhwinder Singh Danny	Indian National Congress
2022	Harbhajan Singh E.T.O.	Aam Aadmi Party

== Election results ==
=== 2027 ===
Punjab Assembly election, 2027: Jandiala
Party	Candidate	Votes	%	±%
AAP				
AD (WPD)				New entry
INC				
BSP				
SAD				
BJP				New entry
NOTA	None of the above			
Majority				
Turnout				

=== 2022 ===
Punjab Assembly election, 2022: Jandiala
Party	Candidate	Votes	%	±%
AAP	Harbhajan Singh ETO	59,724	46.41	▲19.24
INC	Sukhwinder Singh Danny Bandala	34,341	26.69	▼15.81
SAD	Satinderjit Singh Chhajjalwaddi	26,302	20.44	▼7.3
SAD(A)	Bakhshish Singh Uppal	3,361	2.61	New
Independent	Gurnam Singh Daud	1,315	1.02	New
BSP (A)	Hardeep Singh	577	0.45	▼0.09
PLC	Gagandeep Singh A.R.	512	0.4	New
NOTA	None of the above	918	0.71	
Majority		25,383	19.72	
Turnout		128,681		
Registered electors				
AAP gain from INC				

=== 2017 ===
Punjab Assembly election, 2017: Jandiala
Party	Candidate	Votes	%	±%
INC	Sukhwinder Singh Danny Bandala	53,042	43.89	
SAD	Dalbir Singh Verka	34,620	27.74	
AAP	Harbhajan Singh E.T.O.	33,912	27.17	
BSP	Satpal Singh Pakhoke	814	0.65	
APP	Hardeep Singh	679	0.54	
BSP (A)	Vikramjit Singh	669	0.54	
Independent	Harbhajan Singh Jandiala	581	0.47	
NOTA	None of the above			
Majority				
Turnout				
Registered electors		169,613		
INC gain from SAD		Swing		
