= Sahibzada Ajit Singh Nagar Assembly constituency =

Legislative Assembly constituency in Punjab State, India

Coordinates: 30.7°N 76.69°E

S.A.S. Nagar
- Constituency No. 53 for the Punjab Legislative Assembly

Constituency details
- Country: India
- State: Punjab
- District: Mohali
- Lok Sabha constituency: Anandpur Sahib
- Established: 2012
- Total electors: 239,357
- Reservation: None

Member of Legislative Assembly
- 16th Punjab Legislative Assembly
- Incumbent Kulwant Singh
- Party: Aam Aadmi Party
- Elected year: 2022

S.A.S. (Sahibzada Ajit Singh) Nagar Assembly constituency is one of the 117 Legislative Assembly constituencies of Punjab state in India. It is part of Mohali district.

== Members of the Legislative Assembly ==
Most successful parties from S.A.S. Nagar Vidhan Sabha
1. INC (2 Times) (66.7%)
2. AAP (1 Time) (33.3%)

Year	Member	Party
2012	Balbir Singh Sidhu	Indian National Congress
2017	Balbir Singh Sidhu	Indian National Congress
2022	Kulwant Singh	Aam Aadmi Party

== Election results ==
=== 2027 ===
Punjab Assembly election, 2027: S.A.S. Nagar
Party	Candidate	Votes	%	±%
AAP	Kulwant Singh			
AD (WPD)				New entry
INC				
BSP				
SAD				
BJP				
NOTA	None of the above			
Majority				
Turnout				

=== 2022 ===
Punjab Assembly election, 2022: S.A.S. Nagar
Party	Candidate	Votes	%	±%
AAP	Kulwant Singh	77,134	49.70	▲21.80
INC	Balbir Singh Sidhu	43,037	27.73	▼20.13
BJP	Sanjeev Vashisht	17,020	10.97	New entry
SAD	Parvinder Singh Baidwan	9,628	6.20	▼15.30
NOTA	None of the above	1,192	0.77	
Majority		34,097	21.97	
Turnout		155,196	64.8	
Registered electors		239,347		
AAP gain from INC				

=== 2017 ===
Punjab Assembly election, 2017: S.A.S. Nagar
Party	Candidate	Votes	%	±%
INC	Balbir Singh Sidhu	66,844	47.86	▼3.48
AAP	Narinder Singh	38,971	27.90	New entry
SAD	Tejinder Pal Singh	30,031	21.50	▼16.40
NOTA	None of the above	1,139	0.82	
Majority		27,873	19.80	
Turnout		140,803	67.22	
Registered electors		209,473		
INC hold		Swing		

=== 2012 ===
Punjab Assembly election, 2012: S.A.S. Nagar
Party	Candidate	Votes	%	±%
INC	Balbir Singh Sidhu	63,975	51.34	New entry
SAD	Balwant Singh Ramoowalia	47,223	37.90	New entry
PPoP	Bir Devinder Singh Sarao	9,065	7.27	New entry
BSP	Manav Mehra	2,612	2.10	New entry
Independent	Joginder Singh Jogi	702	0.56	New entry
Majority		16,752	13.44	
Turnout		124,678	70.43	
Registered electors				
INC win (new seat)				

== See also ==
- List of constituencies of the Punjab Legislative Assembly
- Mohali district
