= Kulwant Singh =

Kulwant Singh may refer to:

- Kulwant Singh (hockey player), an Indian field hockey player
- Kulwant Singh (politician), an Indian politician
- Kulwant Singh (general), retired Indian Army general and Uttar Yudh Seva Medal (distinguished service award) winner
- Kulwant Singh Bazigar
- Kulwant Singh Gill, retired Indian Air Force air marshal
- Kulwant Singh Pandori, Indian politician
- Kulwant Singh Pannu, retired Indian Army general and Maha Vir Chakra (gallantry award) winner
- Kulwant Singh Virk, Indian author who wrote in Punjabi

== See also ==
- Kalwant Singh (disambiguation)
