= Kalwant Singh =

Kalwant Singh may refer to the following persons:

- Kalwant Singh (drug trafficker), executed Malaysian-Indian drug trafficker
- Kalwant Singh (Indian Army general)

== See also ==
- Kulwant Singh (disambiguation)
