= Amritsar Tahsil =

Administrative subdivision of Punjab providence of British India

Amritsar Tahsil was an administrative subdivision of the Punjab province of British India. The tahsil was located at 31°40′N 74°30′E, and had an area of 545 square miles (1,410 km^{2}). It was bounded on the east by the Beas River, which divided it from the State of Kapurthala. The area west of the high bank had a fertile belt of loam, irrigated by wells, which is succeeded by a belt of sandy country. Beyond this lay a fertile plain irrigated by the Bari Doab Canal. The city of Amritsar city lies in a depression in this tract. The population of the tahsil in 1901 was 488,383, compared with 462,734 in 1891. The city of Amritsar (population, 162,429 in 1901) was the headquarters. It also contained the towns of Majitha (6,403) and Jandiala Guru (7,750); and 373 villages. The land revenue and cesses amounted in 1903–4 to Rs. 6,22,000.
