= Thathera =

Indian Hindu artisan caste

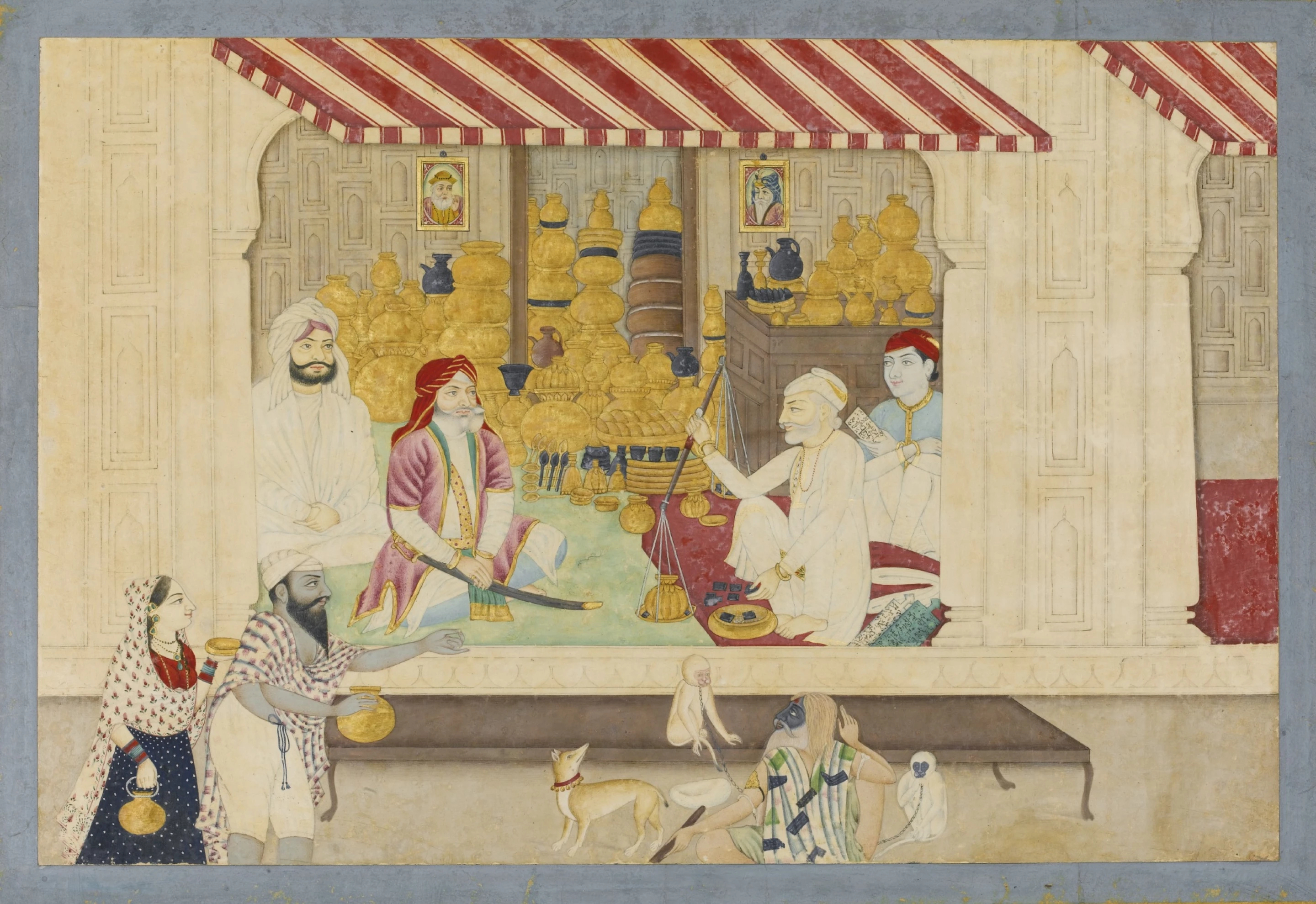
- Mid-19th century painting of a metalworking shop

Regions with significant populations
- India

Languages
- Hindi, Punjabi

Religion
- Hinduism, Sikhism

The Thathera (literally meaning 'the beater', also known as Thathrias) is a Hindu and Sikh artisan caste in India, whose traditional occupation is the making of brass and copper utensils. In 2014, the craft of the Thathera community of Jandiala Guru was included in the UNESCO Intangible Cultural Heritage Lists.

== History ==
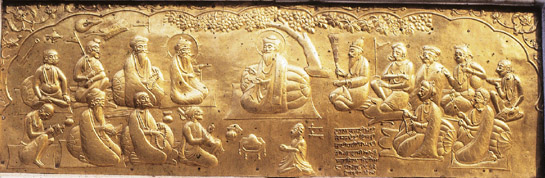
Repoussé plaque (gilded panel) depicting the Sidh Gosht episode of Guru Nanak's life, from Gurdwara Baba Atal Rai, Amritsar, ca.1896

The Thathera communities of Punjab played a prominent role in developing the Sikh School of metal relief artwork. Many of the surviving gilded brass and copper panels affixed to the edifices of the Golden Temple or Gurdwara Baba Atal Rai were crafted by Thathera craftsmen or guilds in the 19th and early 20th century. The most renowned Thatheras for creating metal panel art were located in Kucha Fakirkhana, Lahore. Only three or four Thathera families in Amritsar have preserved the knowledge on how to execute this form of metalworking art at present.

== Present circumstances ==
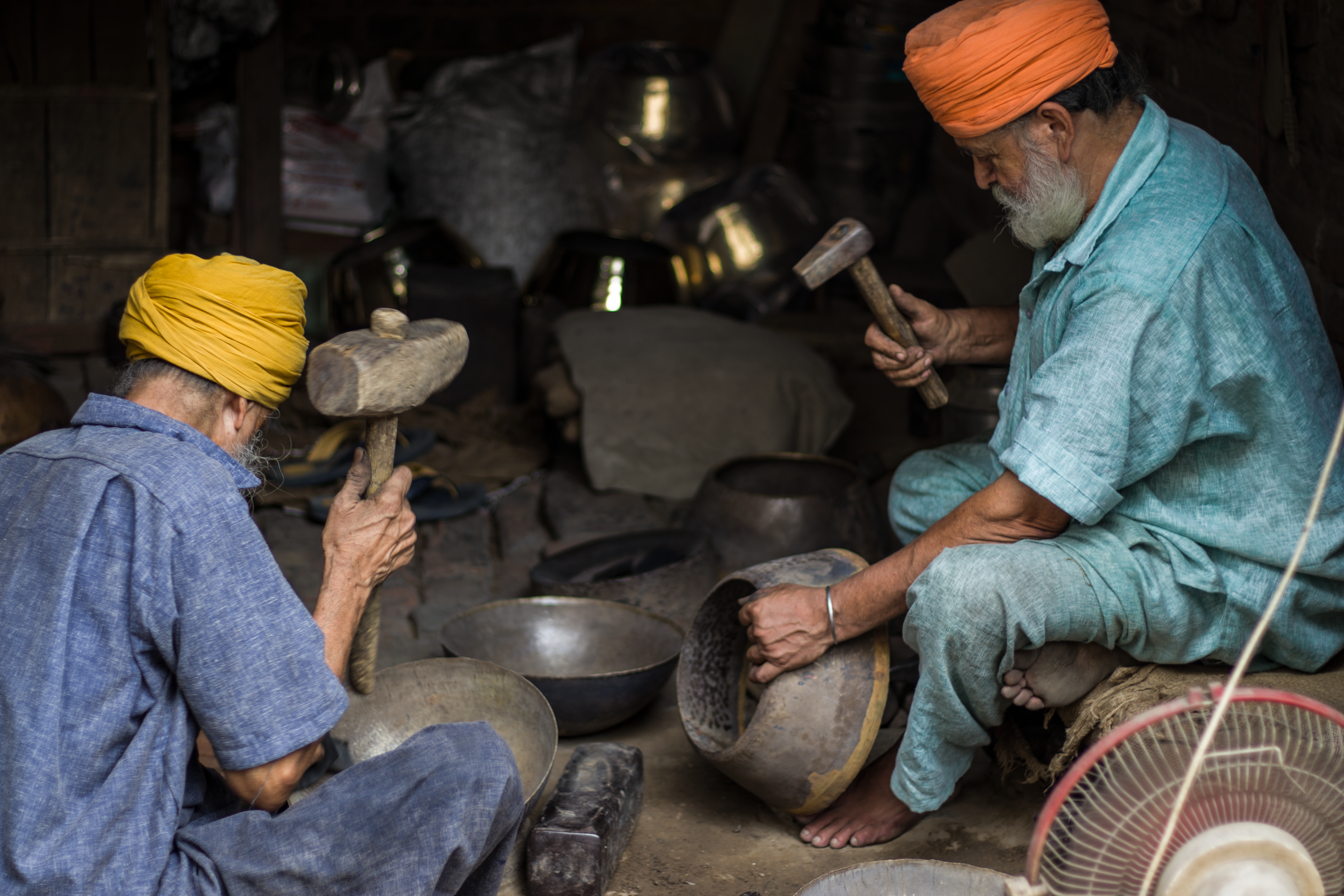
Thatheras

=== Bihar ===
In Bihar, the Thatheras are classified as a Backward Caste.

=== Haryana ===
In Haryana, the Thatheras are classified as a Backward Caste in Block B as Extreme Backward Classes.

=== Himachal Pradesh ===
In Himachal Pradesh, the Thatheras are also known as Thathiars and were recognized as Schedule Caste in 1976.

== UNESCO Listing and Government Programs ==
Although people of the Thathera community reside across the country, only those from Jandiala Guru in the state of Punjab were included in the UNESCO's List of Intangible Cultural Heritage.

After years of neglect and inaction on the part of the government and the civil society, the UNESCO listing prompted the Deputy Commissioner of Amritsar to collaborate with students of Shri Ram College of Commerce to revive the dying craft form. Soon, Navjot Singh Sidhu, the then Minister of Tourism of Punjab pledged Rs. 10 lakhs to this effort, under the umbrella of Project Virasat.

== Gallery ==
=== Jandiala Guru ===
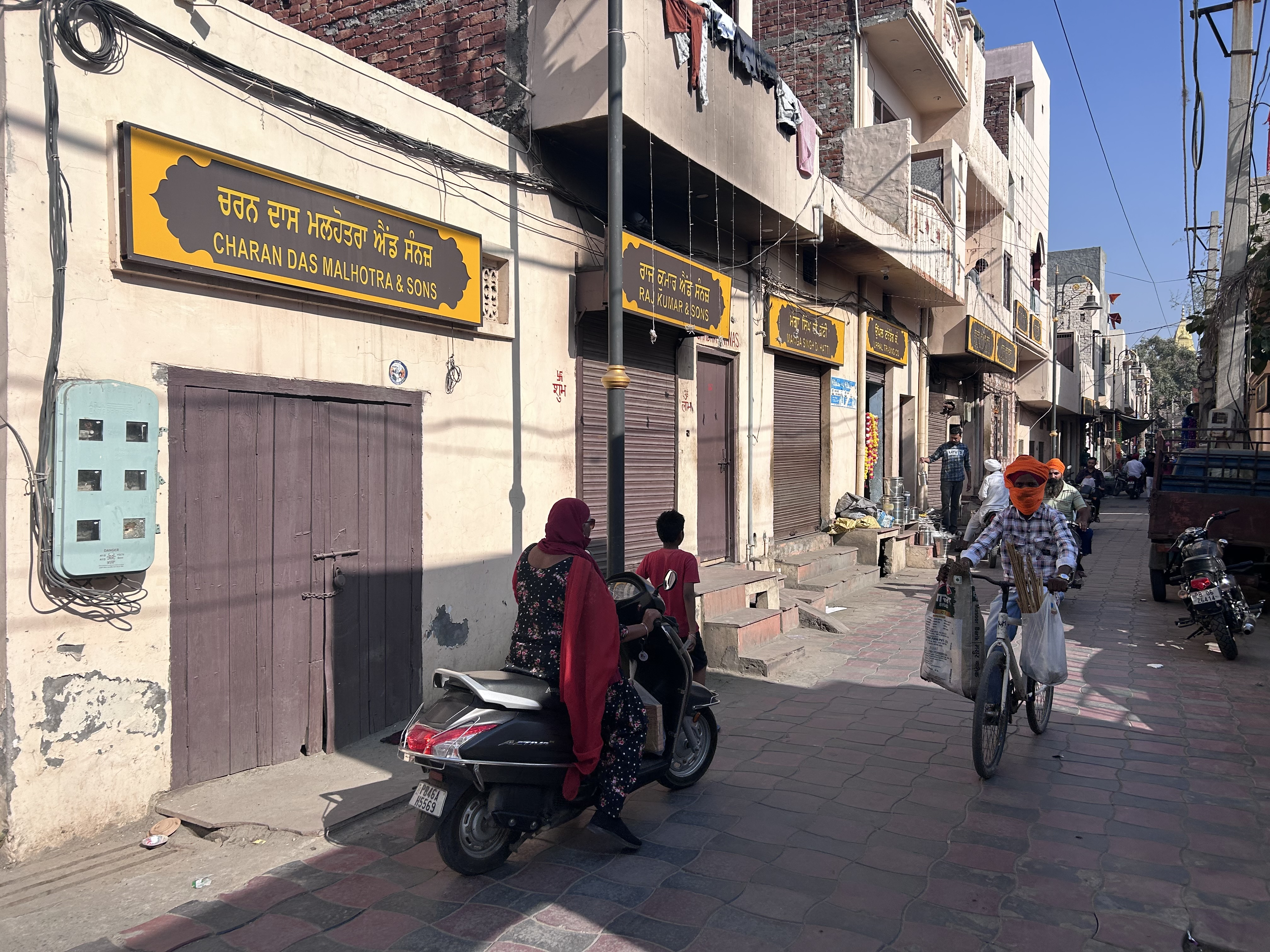
Thathera market of Jandiala Guru

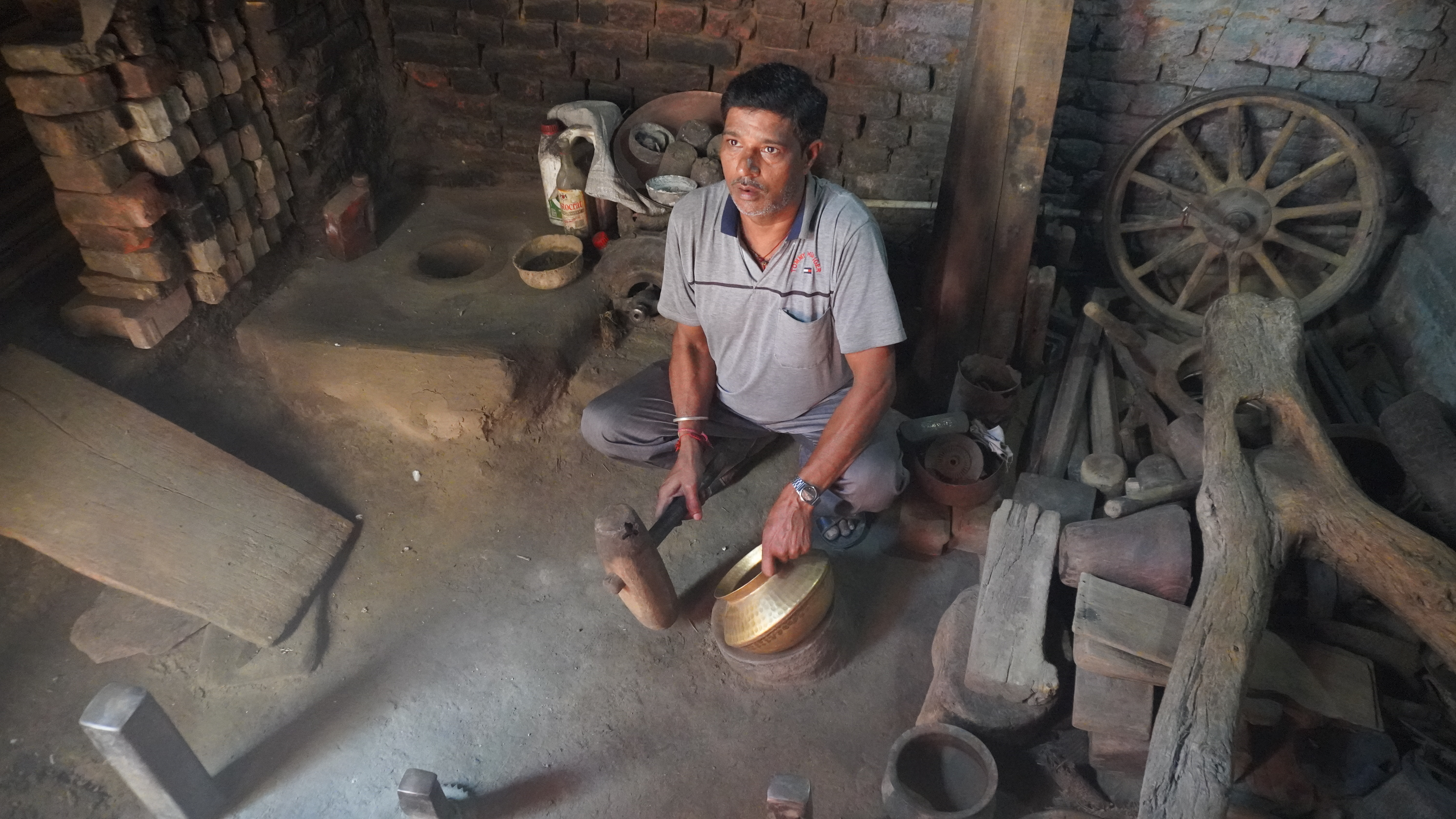
Thathera (brass craftman) utencils' making equipments and workshop

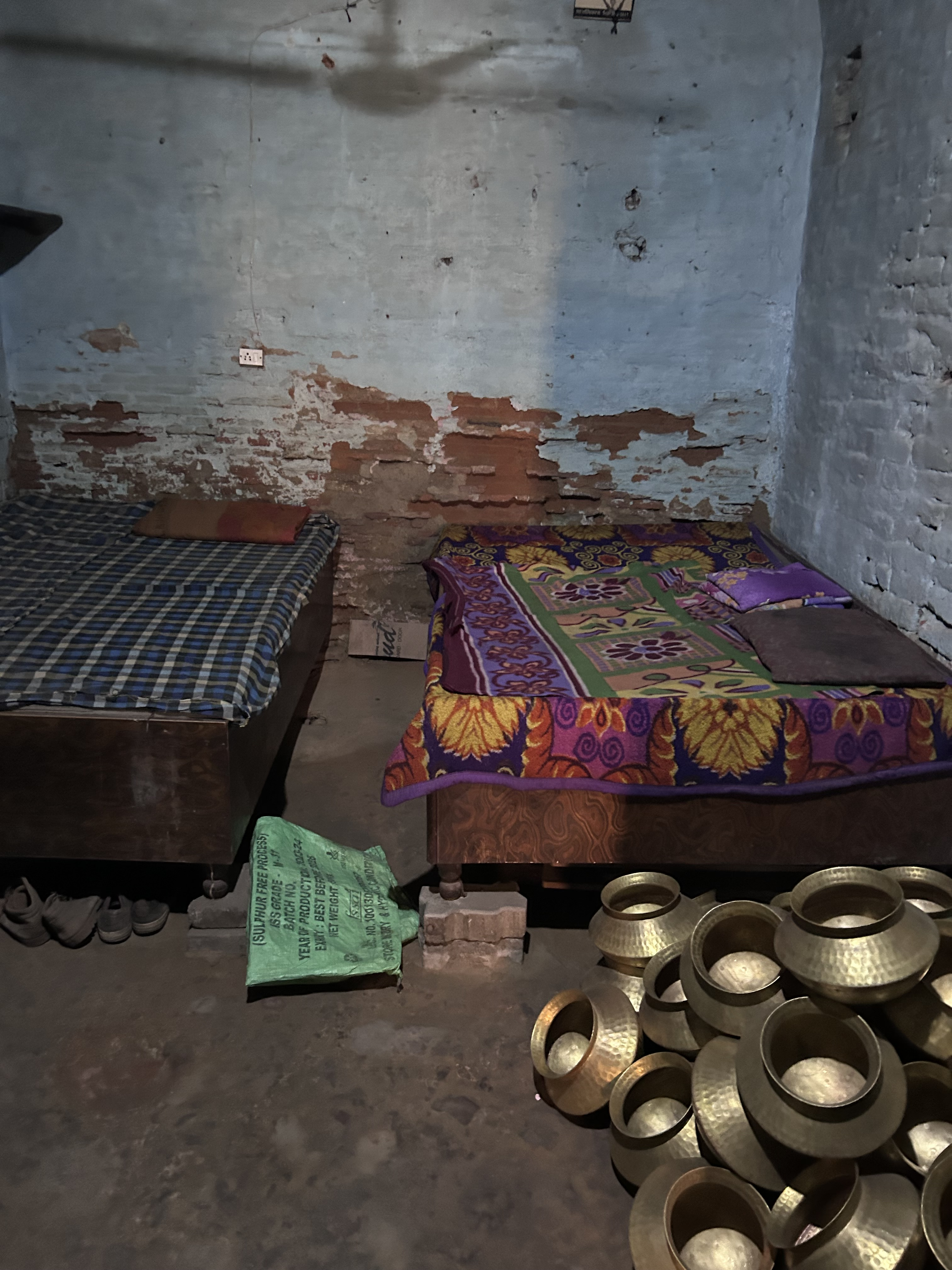
Worksop in the Thathera market.

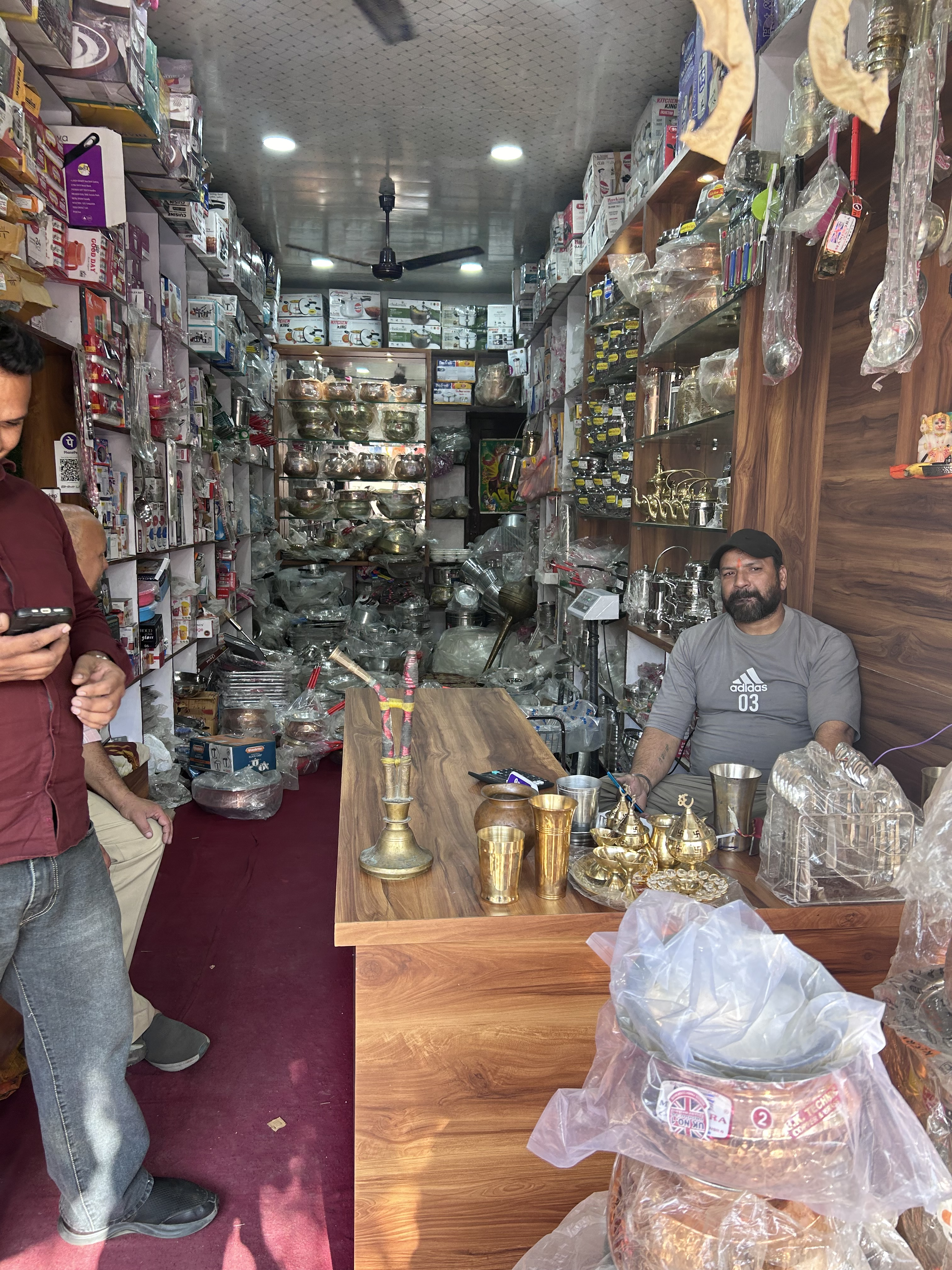
A thathera selling utensils in Thathera market

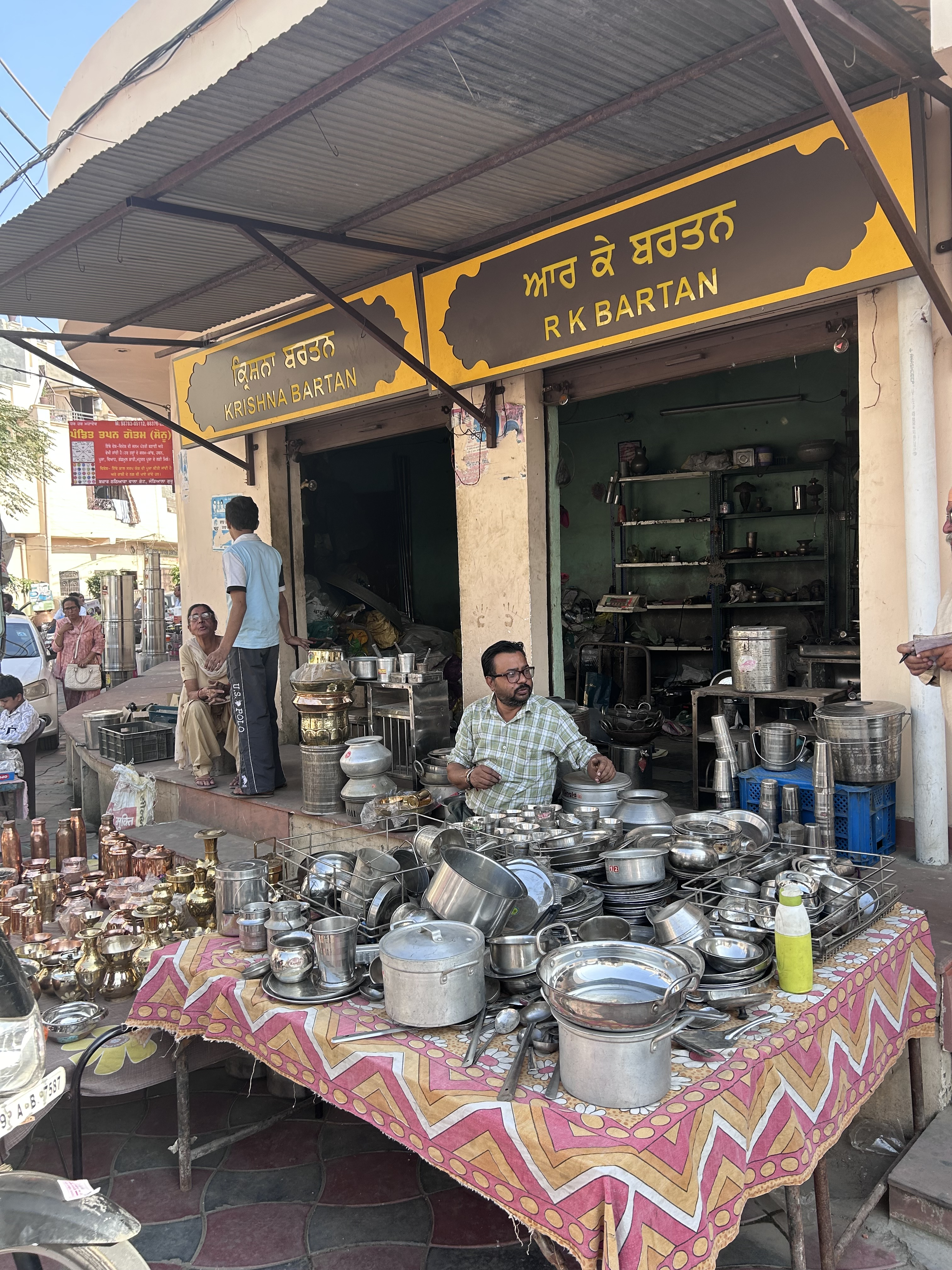
A thathera selling utensils in Thathera market.

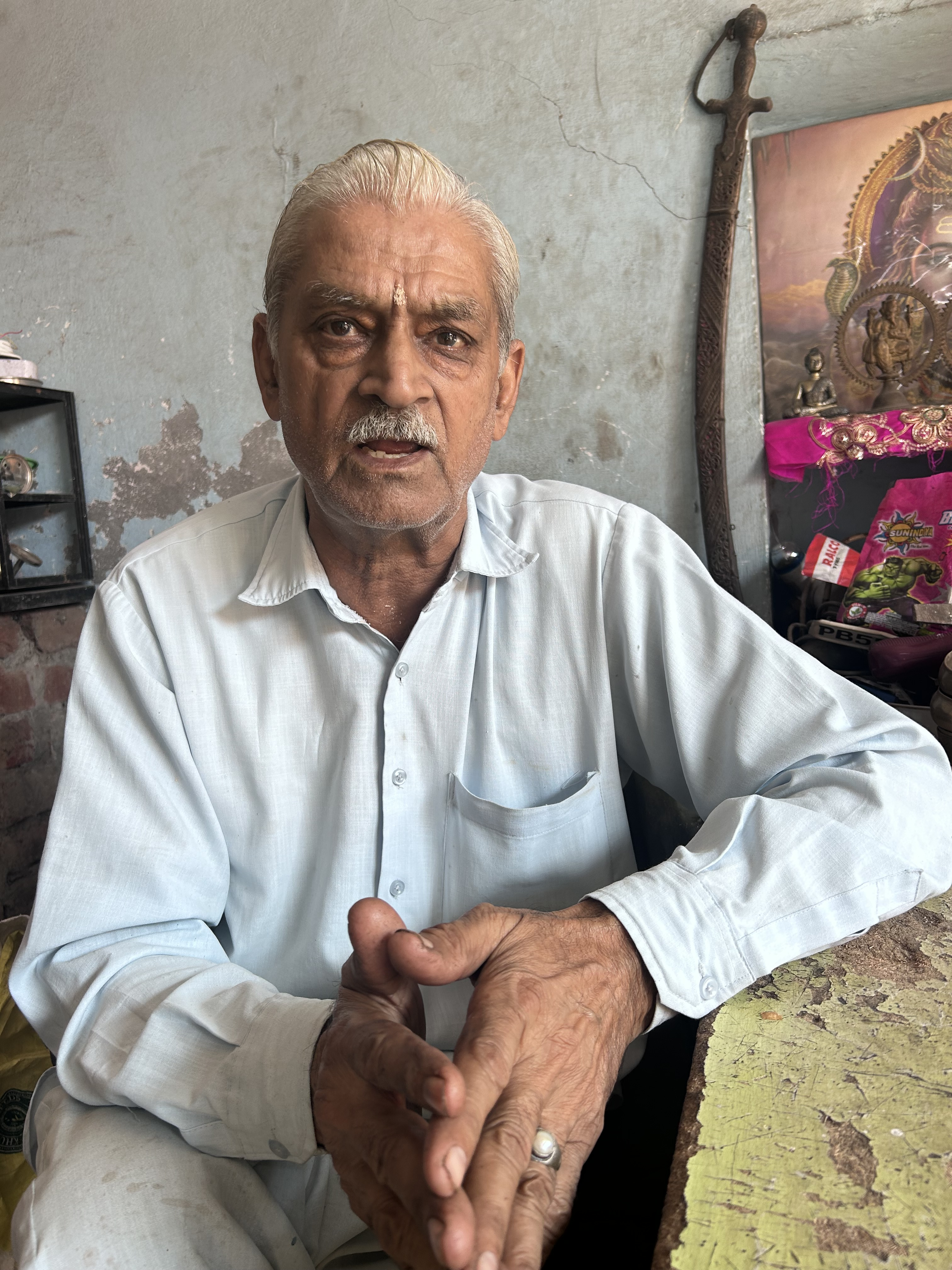
An old (retd.) Thathera craftsman in Thathera market .
