= Sukhwinder Singh Danny Bandala =

Indian politician

Member of the Punjab Legislative Assembly
- In office 2017–2022
- Preceded by: Baljit Singh Jalal Usma
- Succeeded by: Harbhajan Singh ETO
- Constituency: Jandiala

Vice President Punjab Youth Congress
- In office 2005 - 2014

Working President Punjab Pradesh Congress Committee
- Incumbent
- Assumed office 2021

Personal details
- Born: 1977 (age 48–49) Amritsar
- Party: Indian National Congress
- Spouse: Anjali Singh
- Children: 2 Daughters
- Parents: S. Sardul Singh Bandala (father); Gurbachan Kaur (mother)
- Profession: Agriculture

Sukhwinder Singh Danny Bandala is an Indian politician and member of Indian National Congress. He served as a member of the Punjab Legislative Assembly from the Jandiala Assembly constituency from 2017-2022. He is the son of Former Cabinet Minister, Sardul Singh Bandala.

== Political career ==
Singh started his political career with Indian National Congress. He remained Vice President of Punjab Youth Congress from 2005 to 2014. He contested the Lok Sabha Parliamentary seat from Faridkot in 2009. He is currently serving as the working President of Punjab Pradesh Congress Committee. He was elected to the Punjab Vidhan Sabha in 2017, from the Jandiala constituency. He defeated Dalbir Singh of SAD by more than 18000 votes in 2017.
