= Baljit Singh Jalal Usma =

Indian politician

MLA, Punjab
- In office 2012 - present
- Preceded by: Malkiat Singh
- Constituency: Jandiala

Personal details
- Party: Shiromani Akali Dal

Baljit Singh Jalal Usma is an Indian politician and belongs to the ruling Shiromani Akali Dal party. He is a member of the Punjab Legislative Assembly and represents Jandiala.

== Family ==
His father's name is Amar Singh. His wife's name is Gurinder Kaur Jalalusman and his son's name is GuruverJIt Singh.

== Political career ==
Jalal Usma was elected to the Punjab Legislative Assembly from Jandiala in 2012. Now, he is appointed new RTS Commissioner Punjab.
