= Niranjani =

Niranjani may refer to:

- Niranjan, a title of Krishna and epithet for Shiva
- Niranjani Sampradaya, a sect of Hinduism
- Niranjani Akhara, an akhara part of the Akhil Bharatiya Akhara Parishad
- Hindalis, a sect of Sikhism also referred to as Niranjanias
