= Anmol Gagan Maan =

Indian politician and singer

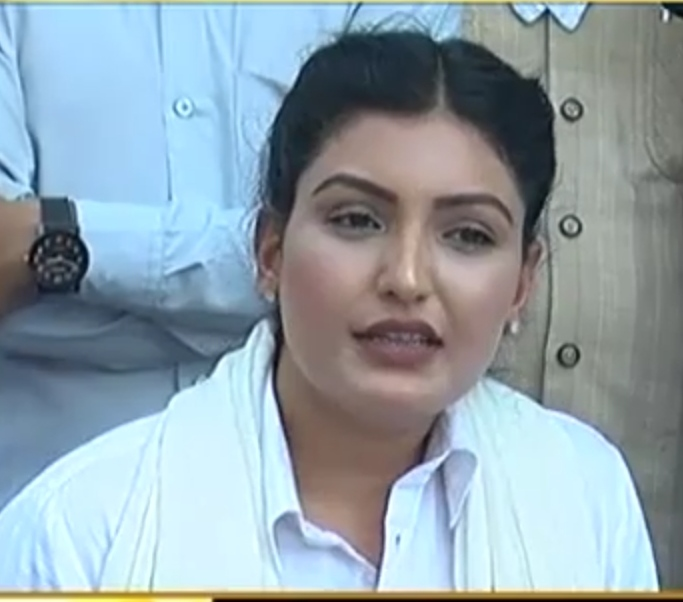
- Maan in 2022

Cabinet Minister, Government of Punjab
- In office 4 July 2022 – 22 September 2024
- Cabinet: Mann ministry
- Chief Minister: Bhagwant Mann
- Ministry and Departments: Tourism & Culture Affairs; Investment Promotion; Labour; Removal of Grievances; Hospitality

MLA, Punjab Legislative Assembly
- Incumbent
- Assumed office 2022
- Constituency: Kharar
- Majority: Aam Aadmi Party

Personal details
- Party: Aam Aadmi Party
- Musical career
- Born: 26 February 1990 (age 36); Mansa, Punjab, India
- Occupations: Singer, model
- Years active: Model 2004–2013; Singer 2014–present
- Website: anmolgaganmaanmusic.com

Anmol Gagan Maan is an Indian politician, minister of the Government of Punjab, India and Punjabi singer. She is the Member of the Legislative Assembly (India) representing the Kharar Assembly constituency in the Punjab Legislative Assembly representing the Aam Aadmi Party. She was elected as the MLA in the 2022 Punjab Legislative Assembly election. Anmol Gagan Maan is also known as Gagandeep Kaur Maan. She is a Punjabi singer known for her Punjabi folk and Bhangra songs.

== Political career ==
Anmol Gagan Maan is a member of the Aam Aadmi Party since 2020. She sang the campaign song for AAP, "Bhagat Singh, Kartar Sarabha saare hi ban challe, bhai hun jaago aaiyaan, sarkaar badlan challey, bhai hun jaago aaiyaan". Indian Express called the song a "huge hit during campaigning".

== Member of Legislative Assembly ==
She represents the Kharar Assembly constituency as MLA in Punjab Legislative Assembly. Maan won the 2022 Punjab Legislative Assembly election from Kharar, SAS Nagar on an Aam Aadmi Party ticket. She defeated Ranjit Singh Gill of the Shiromani Akali Dal by 37,718 votes. The Aam Aadmi Party gained a strong 79% majority in the 16th Punjab Legislative Assembly by winning 92 out of 117 seats in the 2022 Punjab Legislative Assembly election. MP Bhagwant Mann was sworn in as Chief Minister on 16 March 2022.

Committee assignments of Punjab Legislative Assembly

- Member (2022–23) Committee on Public Accounts
- Member (2022–23) Committee on Papers laid/to be laid on the table and Library

== Cabinet Minister ==
5 MLAs including Anmol Gagan Maan were inducted into the Punjab cabinet and their swearing in ceremony took place on 4 July 2022. On 5 July, Bhagwant Mann announced the expansion of his cabinet of ministers with five new ministers to the departments of Punjab state government. Anmol Gagan Maan was among the inducted ministers and was given the charge of following departments.

- Tourism & Culture Affairs
- Investment Promotion
- Labour
- Removal of Grievances

== Electoral performance ==
Punjab Assembly election, 2022: Kharar
Party	Candidate	Votes	%	±%
AAP	Anmol Gagan Maan	78,273	44.30	
SAD	Ranjit Singh Gill	40,388	22.86	
INC	Vijay Sharma	25,291	14.31	
BJP	Kamal Deep Singh	15,249	8.63	New entry
SAD(A)	Lakhvir Singh	7,198	4.07	
NOTA	None of the above	735	0.42	
Majority		37,885	21.44	
Turnout		176,684	66.1	
Registered electors		267,179		

== Discography ==
=== Singles ===
- Phullan Wali Gaddi
- Gal Chakvi
- Patola (feat. Mixsingh)
- Shoukeen Jatt
- Kala Sher (feat. Desi Routz)
- Sohni
- Patandar
- Royal Jatti
- Jagga (Rang Virse Da)
- Jagga
- Jatti (feat. Randy J)

=== Punjabi (album) ===
Year	Song
2015	Velly
2015	Kundi Muchh
2015	Ghaint Purpose
2015	Zamantan
2015	Golden Girl
2015	Red Fulkari
2015	Still Love You
2015	Daawedariyan
2015	Nach Le Sohniya

Political offices
Preceded by Harjot Singh Bains	Punjab Cabinet minister for Tourism & Culture Affairs; 2022–present	Incumbent
Preceded by Bhagwant Mann	Punjab Cabinet minister for Investment Promotion; 2022–present	Incumbent
Preceded by Bhagwant Mann	Punjab Cabinet minister for Labour; 2022–present	Incumbent
Preceded by Bhagwant Mann	Punjab Cabinet minister for Removal of Grievances; 2022–present	Incumbent
State Legislative Assembly
Preceded by -	Member of the Punjab Legislative Assembly from Kharar Assembly constituency 2022 –	Incumbent
