= Jasbir Singh Sandhu =

Indian politician

MLA, Punjab
- Incumbent
- Assumed office 2022
- Constituency: Amritsar West
- Majority: Aam Aadmi Party

Personal details
- Party: Aam Aadmi Party

Jasbir Singh Sandhu is an Indian politician and the Member of the Legislative Assembly (MLA) from Amritsar West Assembly constituency. He is a member of the Aam Aadmi Party.

== Member of Legislative Assembly ==
He represents the Amritsar West Assembly constituency as MLA in Punjab Assembly. The Aam Aadmi Party gained a strong 79% majority in the sixteenth Punjab Legislative Assembly by winning 92 out of 117 seats in the 2022 Punjab Legislative Assembly election. MP Bhagwant Mann was sworn in as Chief Minister on 16 March 2022.

Committee assignments of Punjab Legislative Assembly

- Member (2022–23) Committee on Public Undertakings
- Member (2022–23) Committee on Subordinate Legislation

== Assets and liabilities declared during elections ==
During the 2022 Punjab Legislative Assembly election, he declared Rs. 2,08,62,145 as an overall financial asset and Rs. 15,93,311 as financial liability.

== Electoral performance ==
Assembly Election, 2022: Amritsar West
Party	Candidate	Votes	%	±%
AAP	Jasbir Singh Sandhu	69,251	58.39	
INC	Raj Kumar Verka	25,338	21.36	
SAD	Dalbir Singh Verka	10,370	8.74	
BJP	Amit Kumar	8,999	7.59	
CPI	Amarjit Singh Asal	1,368	1.15	
NOTA	None of the above	987	0.83	
Majority		43,913	37.03	
Turnout		118,606	55.28	
Registered electors		214,073		
AAP gain from INC		Swing		

State Legislative Assembly
Preceded by Raj Kumar Verka (INC)	Member of the Punjab Legislative Assembly from [[Amritsar West Assembly constituency]] 2022 –	Incumbent
