= Kharar Assembly constituency =

Legislative Assembly constituency in Punjab State, India

Coordinates: 30.75°N 76.65°E

Kharar
- Constituency No. 52 for the Punjab Legislative Assembly

Constituency details
- Country: India
- State: Punjab
- District: Mohali
- Lok Sabha constituency: Anandpur Sahib
- Total electors: 266,514
- Reservation: None

Member of Legislative Assembly
- 16th Punjab Legislative Assembly
- Incumbent Anmol Gagan Maan
- Party: Aam Aadmi Party
- Elected year: 2022

Kharar Assembly constituency (Sl. No.: 52) is a Punjab Legislative Assembly constituency in Kharar Sahibzada Ajit Singh Nagar district, Punjab state, India. Anmol Gagan Maan of the Aam Aadmi Party is the incumbent MLA.

== Members of the Legislative Assembly ==
Most successful parties from Kharar Vidhan Sabha
1. INC (4 Times) (30.8%)
2. SAD (4 Times) (30.8%)
3. AAP (2 Times) (15.4%)
4. AD – SFS (1 Time) (7.69%)
5. CPI (1 Time) (7.69%)
6. INC (I) (1 Time) (7.69%)

Year	Member	Party
1967	B. Singh	Akali Dal – Sant Fateh Singh Group
1969	Sarjit Singh	Shiromani Akali Dal
1972	Shamsher Singh Josh	Communist Party of India
1977	Bachittar Singh	Shiromani Akali Dal
1980	Jagat Singh	Indian National Congress (Indira)
1985	Bachittar Singh	Shiromani Akali Dal
1992	Harnek Singh	Indian National Congress
1997	Daljeet Kaur	Shiromani Akali Dal
2002	Bir Devinder Singh	Indian National Congress
2007	Balbir Singh	Indian National Congress
2012	Jagmohan Singh Kang	Indian National Congress
2017	Kanwar Sandhu	Aam Aadmi Party
2022	Anmol Gagan Maan	Aam Aadmi Party

== Election results ==
=== 2027 ===
Punjab Assembly election, 2027: Kharar
Party	Candidate	Votes	%	±%
AAP				
AD (WPD)				New entry
INC				
BSP				
SAD				
BJP				
NOTA	None of the above			
Majority				
Turnout				

=== 2022 ===
Punjab Assembly election, 2022: Kharar
Party	Candidate	Votes	%	±%
AAP	Anmol Gagan Maan	78,273	44.30	
SAD	Ranjit Singh Gill	40,388	22.86	
INC	Vijay Sharma	25,291	14.31	
BJP	Kamal Deep Singh	15,249	8.63	New entry
SAD(A)	Lakhvir Singh	7,198	4.07	
NOTA	None of the above	735	0.42	
Majority		37,885	21.44	
Turnout		176,684	66.1	
Registered electors		267,179		

=== 2017 ===
Punjab Assembly election, 2017: Kharar
Party	Candidate	Votes	%	±%
AAP	Kanwar Sandhu	54,171	33.97	
INC	Jagmohan Singh Kang	52,159	32.71	
SAD	Ranjit Singh Gill	46,807	29.35	
BSP	Harbhajan Singh	2,619	1.64	
Majority		2,012	1.30	
Turnout		158,419	71.8	
Registered electors		222,075		

=== 2012 ===
Punjab Assembly election, 2012: Kharar
Party	Candidate	Votes	%	±%
INC	Jagmohan Singh Kang	49,451	37.0	
SAD	Ujjagar Singh	42,670	31.90	
BSP	Arjan Singh	22,884	17.1	
Majority		6,779	5.1	
Turnout		133,592		
Registered electors		173,220		

== See also ==
- List of constituencies of the Punjab Legislative Assembly
- Mohali district
