= Kulwant Singh (politician) =

Indian politician

Member of Punjab Legislative Assembly
- Incumbent
- Assumed office 10 March 2022
- Preceded by: Balbir Singh Sidhu
- Constituency: S. A. S. Nagar

Mayor of Mohali
- In office 31 August 2015 – 31 August 2020
- Preceded by: Post Established
- Succeeded by: Amarjeet Singh Sidhu

Personal details
- Born: 1 November 1961 (age 64) Ropar, Punjab, India
- Party: Aam Aadmi Party
- Other political affiliations: Shiromani Akali Dal
- Profession: Political leader, Entrepreneur, and Philanthropist
- Website: https://www.facebook.com/KulwantSinghSAD

Kulwant Singh is a businessman and politician who is currently a Member of Legislative Assembly from SAS Nagar and is the first Mayor of Mohali (Punjab). He is a member of the Aam Aadmi Party.

== Early life ==
He was born into a Ramdasia Sikh family of an army man at Samana Kalan, Rupnagar, Punjab.

He left his village and went to Zirakpur and spent three years weighing trucks and other heavy vehicles. He also rode horse carts through the streets to sell the stock of wheat straw.

== Business ==
Kulwant Singh is a real estate businessman and philanthropist. He is the Managing Director of Janta Land Promoters Ltd. and have turnover of Rs.1500 crore. He also has two commercial buildings which include two shop-cum-offices in Sector 82, Mohali.

He owns plots, residential areas and other properties in various places of Punjab and Himachal Pradesh.

== Political career ==
Kulwant Singh represented the ward number 21 as Senior Vice-President of Mohali Municipal Council elections in 1995 for the first time. He was also President of Mohali Municipal Council from 2000 to 2005. In 2015, he became first mayor of Mohali after declaration of the council being upgraded as the municipal corporation. He was a candidate for the Fatehgarh Sahib Constituency on the SAD-BJP ticket in 2014 Lok Sabha Elections. Kulwant was one of the richest candidates from Punjab.

In June 2023, a street in New York City was dedicated in honour of Dr. B. R. Ambedkar. The inauguration ceremony was led by Kulwant Singh and was organised by the management of the Guru Ravidass Temple, located opposite the street.

== Member of Legislative Assembly ==
He represents the Sahibzada Ajit Singh Nagar Assembly constituency as MLA in Punjab Assembly. The Aam Aadmi Party gained a strong 79% majority in the sixteenth Punjab Legislative Assembly by winning 92 out of 117 seats in the 2022 Punjab Legislative Assembly election. MP Bhagwant Mann was sworn in as Chief Minister on 16 March 2022.

Committee assignments of Punjab Legislative Assembly

- Member (2022–23) Committee on Local Bodies
- Member (2022–23) Committee on Subordinate Legislation
- Member (2022–23) Committee on Agriculture and its allied activities

== Electoral performance ==
Punjab Assembly election, 2022: S.A.S. Nagar
| Party | Candidate | Votes | % | ±% |
|---|---|---|---|---|
| AAP | Kulwant Singh | 77,134 | 49.70 | ▲21.80 |
| INC | Balbir Singh Sidhu | 43,037 | 27.73 | ▼20.13 |
| BJP | Sanjeev Vashisht | 17,020 | 10.97 | New entry |
| SAD | Parvinder Singh Baidwan | 9,628 | 6.20 | ▼15.30 |
| NOTA | None of the above | 1,192 | 0.77 | |
| Majority | | 34,097 | 21.97 | |
| Turnout | | 155,196 | 64.8 | |
| Registered electors | | 239,347 | | |
| AAP gain from INC | | | | |
