= Jagmohan Singh Kang =

Indian politician

MLA, Punjab
- In office 1992 - 1997
- Preceded by: Ravinder Singh (politician)
- Succeeded by: Ravinder Singh
- Constituency: Morinda
- In office 2002 - 2007
- Preceded by: Ravinder Singh
- Succeeded by: Ujaggar Singh
- Constituency: Morinda
- In office 2012 - 2017
- Preceded by: Balbir Singh
- Constituency: Kharar

Minister for Animal Husbandry, Dairy Development Tourism & Fisheries
- In office 2007 - 2012
- Chief Minister: Capt. Amarinder Singh
- Succeeded by: Gulzar Singh Ranike

Personal details
- Party: Aam Aadmi Party
- Other political affiliations: Indian National Congress (until 2021)

Jagmohan Singh Kang is an Indian politician and a member of Indian National Congress. He was a 2 time member of Punjab Vidhan Sabha from Morinda & 1 time from Kharar from 2012 to 2017. From 1992 to 1997 & 2002 to 2007 he was the Minister for Revenue & Rehabilitation, Irrigation & Power, Jails & Judiciary, Sports, Animal Husbandry, Dairy Development Tourism & Fisheries in Punjab Government.

== Early life ==
His father's name was Late S. Surinderpal Singh Kang. He was IPS (Retd.) & Ex-Army Officer. He was from Traditional Congress Jat Sikh family of Village Shahidgarh in Fatehgarh Sahib District and Boor Majra in Ropar District with agriculturist background.

== Political career ==
Jagmohan Singh Kang was the MLA from Kharar. He is associated with Indian National Congress since 1974. He was elected as MLA from Morinda vidhan sabha seat in the elections held in 1992, 2002 & from Kharar in 2012. He won by a margin of 6776 votes. Ujagar Singh of SAD was the trailing candidate. In 2017 he was the candidate from INC and lost to Kanwar Sandhu (AAP) by a margin of 2012 votes. He secured 52159 votes.

=== Positions held ===
1976-80 : Convener, Art and Culture Cell of Pb.Youth Congress

1982-1985: Vice-President, Punjab Youth Congress

1982-1992 : Member Executive, Punjab Pradesh Congress (I)

1985- 1987 : Member National Council of Indian Youth Congress (I)

1992-1997 : MLA, Punjab Revenue & Rehabilitation, Irrigation & Power, Jails & Judiciary Minister, Punjab

1997-2001 : General Secretary, P.P.C.C. P.R.O. Mizoram for A.I.C.C. elections 2001. Member A.I.C.C.

2002-2007 : MLA, Punjab Animal Husbandry, Fisheries, Dairy Development, Sports, Youth Services and Tourism Minister, Punjab

2010 : Member Election Authority & Addl. PRO Uttar Pradesh Organizational Election

2012-2017 : MLA from Kharar, Punjab

He was elected to the Punjab Legislative Assembly in 1992 from Morinda. He was re-elected from Morinda in 2002 and from Kharar in 2012.

=== Aam Aadmi Party ===
On 1 February 2022, he joined Aam Aadmi Party after quitting Indian National Congress. His two sons also joined AAP. Later joined back Indian National Congress in 2024 along with his two sons.
