= Raj Kumar Verka =

Indian politician

Dr. Raj Kumar Verka
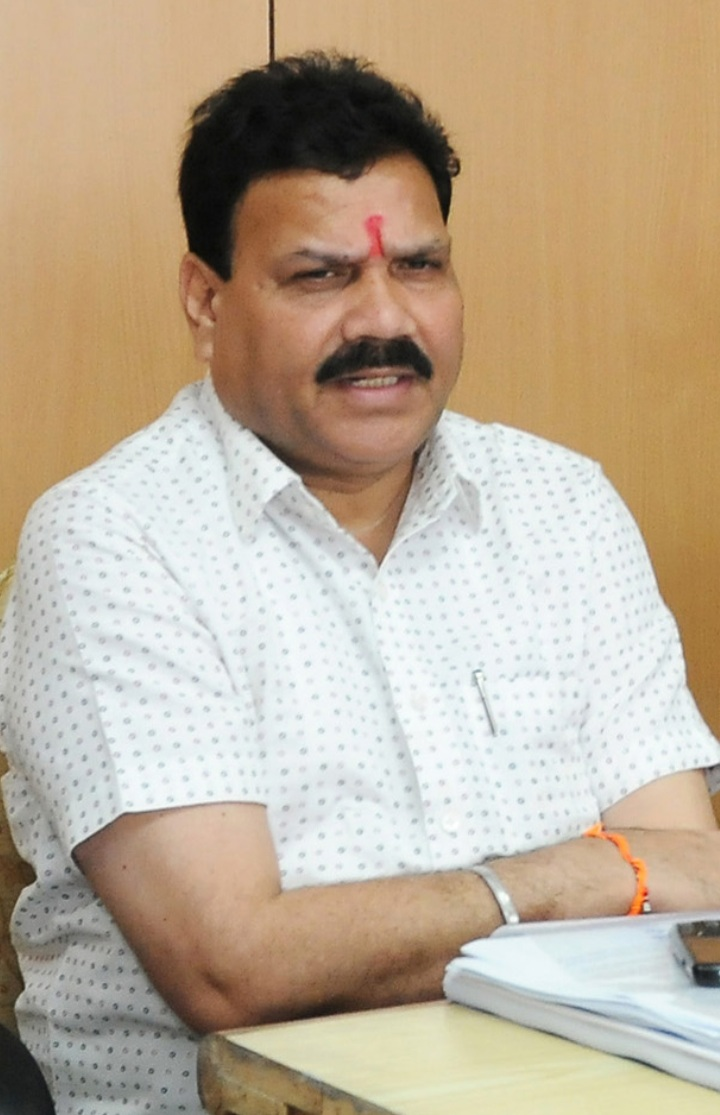
- Dr. Raj Kumar Verka

MLA, Punjab
- In office 2002–2007
- Preceded by: Ujjagar Singh
- Succeeded by: Dalbir Singh
- Constituency: Verka
- In office 2012–2022
- Preceded by: Om Parkash Soni
- Succeeded by: Jasbir Singh Sandhu
- Constituency: Amritsar West

Personal details
- Born: 20 March 1963 (age 63) Amritsar, Punjab, India
- Party: Indian National Congress (present)
- Other political affiliations: Bharatiya Janata Party (from June 2022 to 13 October 2023 )

Dr. Raj Kumar Verka (born 20 March 1963) is an Indian politician and a member of Indian National Congress. He is a Member of Punjab Legislative Assembly (MLA) and represented Amritsar West as Indian National Congress member. He was also vice chairman of National Commission for Scheduled Castes.

== Early life ==
He belongs to Valmiki Community.

== Political career ==
Verka first successfully contested Punjab Legislative Assembly from Verka constituency in 2002. from 2002 to 2004 he was chairman of Punjab Information technology corporation, further from 2004 to 2007 he was a Chief Parliamentary secretary.

In 2012, he was elected from Amritsar West.

Verka was one of the 42 INC MLAs who submitted their resignation in protest of a decision of the Supreme Court of India ruling Punjab's termination of the Sutlej-Yamuna Link (SYL) water canal unconstitutional.

He was elected for his third term in 2017 from Amritsar West Assembly constituency. He was the cabinet minister of the Congress party in the Punjab government from 2017 to 2022.

He became Chairman of Punjab State Warehousing Corporation in 2018 being an MLA who received Cabinet Minister Status. He also became Cabinet Minister in the Punjab Government as Minister of Social Justice, Medical Education and Research, and New and Sustainable Resource of Energy.

He joined Bhartiya Janata Party on 4 June 2022 along with Balbir Singh Sidhu, Gurpreet Singh Kangar, Sundar Sham Arora, and others at the party office in Chandigarh.

=== Achievement & Awards ===
Dr. Rajkumar Verka was awarded the degree of Doctor Honoris Causa by the Governing body of Desh Bhagat University for his Exceptional Contribution in the field of Indian Political and Social work under the Faculty of Social Science.

=== National Commission for Schedule Castes ===
He held the post of Vice-Chairman of the National Commission for Scheduled Castes with the rank of Minister of State, Government of India for two terms.
