= Devi Das Nahar =

Indian activist and politician

Personal details
- Born: Amritsar, Punjab, India
- Occupation: Politician

Devi Das Nahar is a Valmiki activist and politician from Amritsar district, Punjab, India. He is president of Valmiki Dharam Yudh Morcha.

== Political career ==
Nahar is president of Bahujan Samaj Party (Ambedkar), a splinter group of the Bahujan Samaj Party active in Amritsar area of Punjab. In the 2002 legislative assembly elections in Punjab, BSP(A) put up 23 candidates, who together received 20,260 votes. The BSP(A) reunited with the BSP on 31 December 2003. In 2004, after the elections of Lok Sabha, Sh. Devi Dass Nahar along with Jia Lal Nahar, Pritam Chand and Balwant Singh Sultanpur was expelled from Bahujan Samaj Party and refloated his BSP(A) due to differences with Narendra Kumar Kashyap national general secretary of party and state president Avtar Singh Karimpuri. In 2009 Lok Sabha elections, BSP(A) announced its support to the SAD-BJP candidates after Sukhbir Singh Badal met with Devi Dass Nahar.

== See also ==
- Bhagwan Valmiki Tirath Sthal
- Bahujan Samaj Party
